= Handan Airport =

Airport in Hebei, China

Handan Airport 邯郸机场
- IATA: HDG; ICAO: ZBHD

Summary
- Airport type: Public
- Operator: Handan Airport Co. Ltd.
- Serves: Handan, Hebei
- Location: Matou Town, Hanshan, Handan
- Opened: 8 August 2007; 18 years ago
- Coordinates: 36°31′26″N 114°25′48″E
- Website: www.hdairport.net

Map
- Location of airport in Hebei

Runways
Direction	Length		Surface
Direction	m	ft	Surface
05/23	2,600	8,530	Concrete

Statistics (2025)
- Passengers: 952,260
- Cargo: 1,191.1 tons
- Aircraft movements: 10,516

Handan Airport
- Simplified Chinese: 邯郸机场
- Traditional Chinese: 邯鄲機場
Transcriptions
Standard Mandarin
- Hanyu Pinyin: Hándān Jīchǎng

Handan Airport (IATA: HDG, ICAO: ZBHD), also known as Handan Matou Airport, is an airport serving the city of Handan in Hebei Province, China. It is located 11 kilometers southwest of Handan, and 43 kilometers north of the city of Anyang in neighboring Henan Province. The airport was opened in August 2007 and is now undergoing a 120 million yuan expansion.

== History ==
In 1992, the expansion project of Handan Airport was officially approved, transforming the original Matou Airport into Handan Airport. The feasibility study report and preliminary design were approved in 1993. However, the subsequent path to takeoff was fraught with difficulties.

On July 25, 2002, Handan City and China Eastern General Aviation Company signed an agreement to cooperate in the construction of Handan Airport, finally bringing the project, which had been delayed for about ten years, to fruition. In June 2004, Handan City held a ground-breaking ceremony for the expansion project of Handan Airport in Matou Town, on the western outskirts of the city, and the airport officially started construction.

In December 2006, the construction of Handan Airport, with an investment of 200 million yuan, was completed. The airport's flight area is built to 3C standards. The runway is 2,200 meters long and 45 meters wide, with 1.5-meter-wide shoulders on both sides and a 30-centimeter-thick concrete pavement. It can accommodate medium-sized passenger aircraft such as the Air Force 319 and Boeing 737. The airport's connecting taxiway is 180 meters long, and the apron is 130 meters long and 100 meters wide, capable of accommodating two medium-sized passenger aircraft simultaneously.

In 2009, Handan Airport launched the preliminary work for the expansion and renovation of the flight area. In June of the same year, it began the preparation of the feasibility study report, preliminary design and construction drawing design. In 2014, the expansion project of the flight area of Handan Airport passed the industry acceptance.

In February 2016, the North China Regional Administration of the Civil Aviation Administration of China officially issued the "Approval on the Change of Handan Airport Use Permit" to Handan Airport. The flight zone level of the airport was upgraded from "3C" to "4C"; the fire and rescue level was upgraded from "Level 5" to "Level 6"; and the permitted aircraft type was changed to "Boeing 737-800 and similar or lower type".

In May 2018, the expansion and renovation project of Handan Airport commenced construction. On September 22, 2020, with the smooth landing of flight G52638 from Tianjin to Handan Airport, the expansion and renovation project of Handan Airport was completed and opened to traffic on schedule.

== Facilities ==
The airport has one runway that is 2,200 meters long and 45 meters wide, and a 15,000-square-meter terminal building. In June 2011, construction started to expand the airport which includes lengthening the runway to 2,600 meters.

== Airlines and destinations ==
Handan Matou Airport is served by the following airlines:

Airlines	Destinations
China Eastern Airlines	Kunming, Shanghai–Pudong
China Express Airlines	Chongqing, Dalian, Hohhot, Shenzhen
GX Airlines	Haikou, Nanning, Sanya
Hainan Airlines	Guangzhou
Loong Air	Hangzhou, Harbin, Xining
Sichuan Airlines	Chengdu–Shuangliu
Spring Airlines	Shenyang, Xiamen

== See also ==
- List of airports in China
- List of the busiest airports in China
