= Nyingchi Mainling Airport =

Airport in Mainling, Tibet, China

Nyingchi Mainling Airport 林芝米林机场
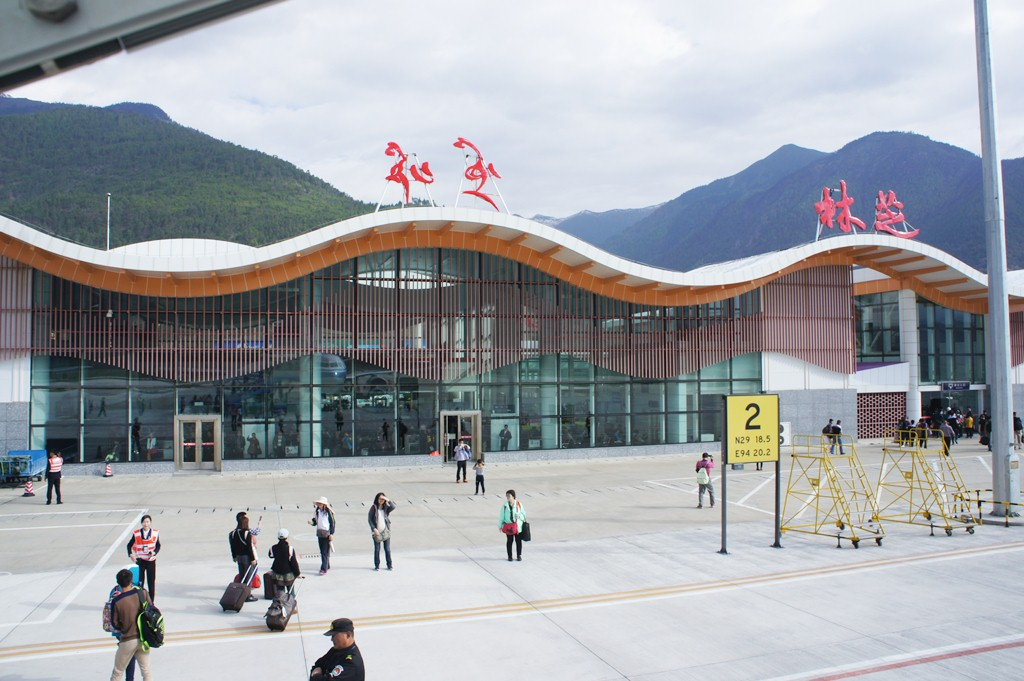
- Nyingchi Mainling Airport
- IATA: LZY; ICAO: ZUNZ

Summary
- Airport type: Public
- Serves: Nyingchi
- Location: Mainling, Tibet Autonomous Region
- Elevation AMSL: 2,949 m (9,675 ft)
- Coordinates: 29°18′12″N 94°20′07″E

Map
- Location of airport in Tibet

Runways
Direction	Length		Surface
Direction	m	ft	Surface
05/23	3,000	9,843	Concrete

Statistics (2025)
- Passengers: 967,829
- Aircraft movements: 9,968
- Cargo (metric tons): 4,454.8
- Source: CAAC

Nyingchi Mainling Airport
- Simplified Chinese: 林芝米林机场
- Traditional Chinese: 林芝米林機場
Transcriptions
Standard Mandarin
- Hanyu Pinyin: Línzhī Mǐlín Jīchǎng

Linzhi Milin Airport, also called Nyingchi Mainling Airport, (IATA: LZY, ICAO: ZUNZ) is a dual-use military and civilian airport in Mainling, Nyingchi, Tibet Autonomous Region, China. It is suggested to be one of the most challenging instrument approaches in the world, since the airport is in a winding valley.

== History ==
In October 2001, the Tibetan government approved the establishment of the "Nyingchi Civil Airport Construction Project Command Center." The site was chosen on the banks of the Yarlung Tsangpo River, nestled between two mountains, at an altitude of 2,951 meters. Construction began in October 2003, with a total investment of 780 million yuan and a designed annual passenger capacity of 120,000. It was fully completed and passed test flights and acceptance tests in August 2006, and officially opened to traffic on September 1, 2006.

2007 was the first year of operation for Nyingchi Airport, with a passenger throughput of 53,000.

In 2011, the airport's passenger throughput reached 144,000, far exceeding its designed saturation capacity.

In June 2014, the expansion and renovation project of Linzhi Mainling Airport was approved by the state. The project will be implemented in accordance with the goal of meeting the 2020 passenger throughput of 750,000 passengers and cargo throughput of 3,000 tons. The project includes the construction of a new 10,360-square-meter terminal building, a 3,000-square-meter comprehensive support building, a fire station, a pump station, and the renovation of the old terminal building, with a total investment of about 270 million yuan.

The airport expansion and renovation project commenced construction in March 2015. The terminal building has a floor area of approximately 10,358 square meters and includes 11 check-in counters, 4 security checkpoints, and 4 jet bridges. The new terminal features a two-story layout. The first floor primarily handles passenger check-in, departure security checks, remote gate waiting areas, and baggage claim. The second floor mainly serves as the waiting area for general passengers and the first-class area.

On March 6, 2017, the new terminal building of the airport was put into use, and the old terminal building was temporarily closed; on May 15, 2018, the old terminal building was converted into a VIP waiting room and put into use.

On May 17, 2019, the Linzhi Manlin Airport parallel taxiway project was officially launched. On February 1, 2021, the project passed industry acceptance. The total investment of the project was 532 million RMB. The main construction contents included the construction of a new parallel taxiway with the same length as the existing runway, a width of 23 meters, and perpendicular to the north side of the existing runway by 182.5 meters; the construction of three new perpendicular connecting taxiways to the runway and the parallel taxiway; and the construction of a new apron with six Category C aircraft parking positions on the west side of the existing apron.

== Operation ==
Nyingchi Airport is the third airport that Tibet has put into operation. Built at a cost of 780 million yuan (96.18 million U.S. dollars), including investment by the General Administration of Civil Aviation of China (CAAC), the airport is 2,949 meters above sea level, lower than the other two civil airports, with a designed annual passenger flow of 120,000.

Known as one of the world's most difficult airports for aircraft to reach, Nyingchi Airport is situated in the valley of the Yarlung Tsangpo River in the Southeast of Qinghai-Tibet Plateau, surrounded by over-4,000-metre-high (13,000 ft) mountains enveloped by clouds and fog throughout the year. Aircraft have to fly through the narrow and winding river valley to approach the airport. The narrowest flight path is less than 4 km from one mountain ridge along the valley to the opposite one. According to meteorological data, there are just 100 days overall with suitable weather to operate to the airport each year.

The first landing of a commercial aircraft was made by an Air China Boeing 757 without passengers on July 12, 2006. Six weeks later, the airport welcomed its first commercial flight carrying passengers. The airport uses a required navigation performance (RNP) approach procedure to provide instrument approach guidance through surrounding valleys to the vicinity of the runway threshold.

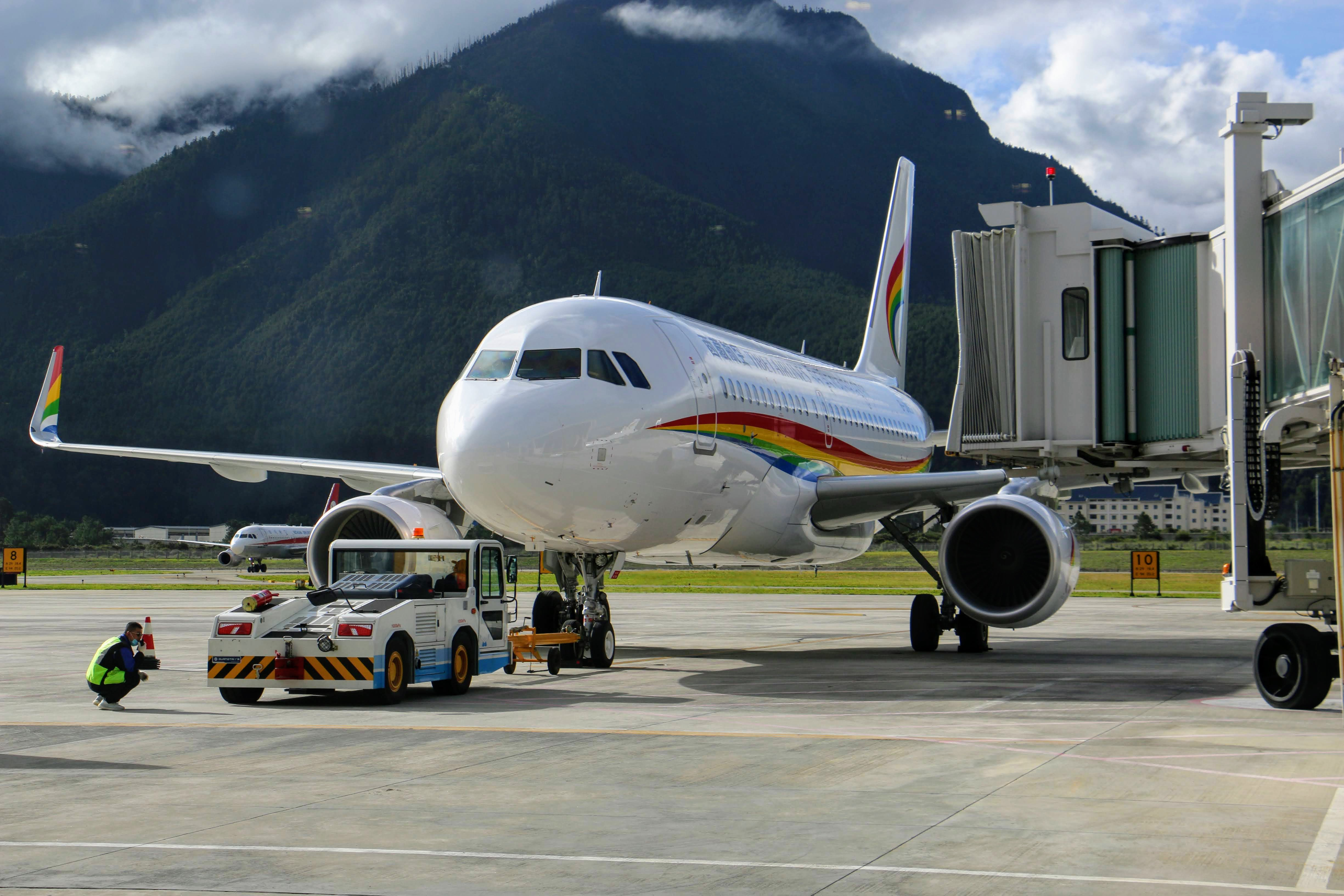
Tibet Airlines A319 at LZY Nyingchi Mainling Airport

== Airlines and destinations ==
Airlines	Destinations
Air China	Beijing–Capital, Chengdu–Tianfu, Wuhan
China Southern Airlines	Changsha, Guangzhou, Shenzhen
Chongqing Airlines	Chongqing
Sichuan Airlines	Chengdu–Shuangliu, Chengdu–Tianfu, Chongqing, Xi'an
Tibet Airlines	Chengdu–Shuangliu, Chongqing, Hefei, Mianyang, Xi'an
West Air	Chongqing

== See also ==
- List of airports in China
