= Changzhou Benniu International Airport =

Airport serving Changzhou, Jiangsu, China

Changzhou Benniu International Airport 常州奔牛国际机场
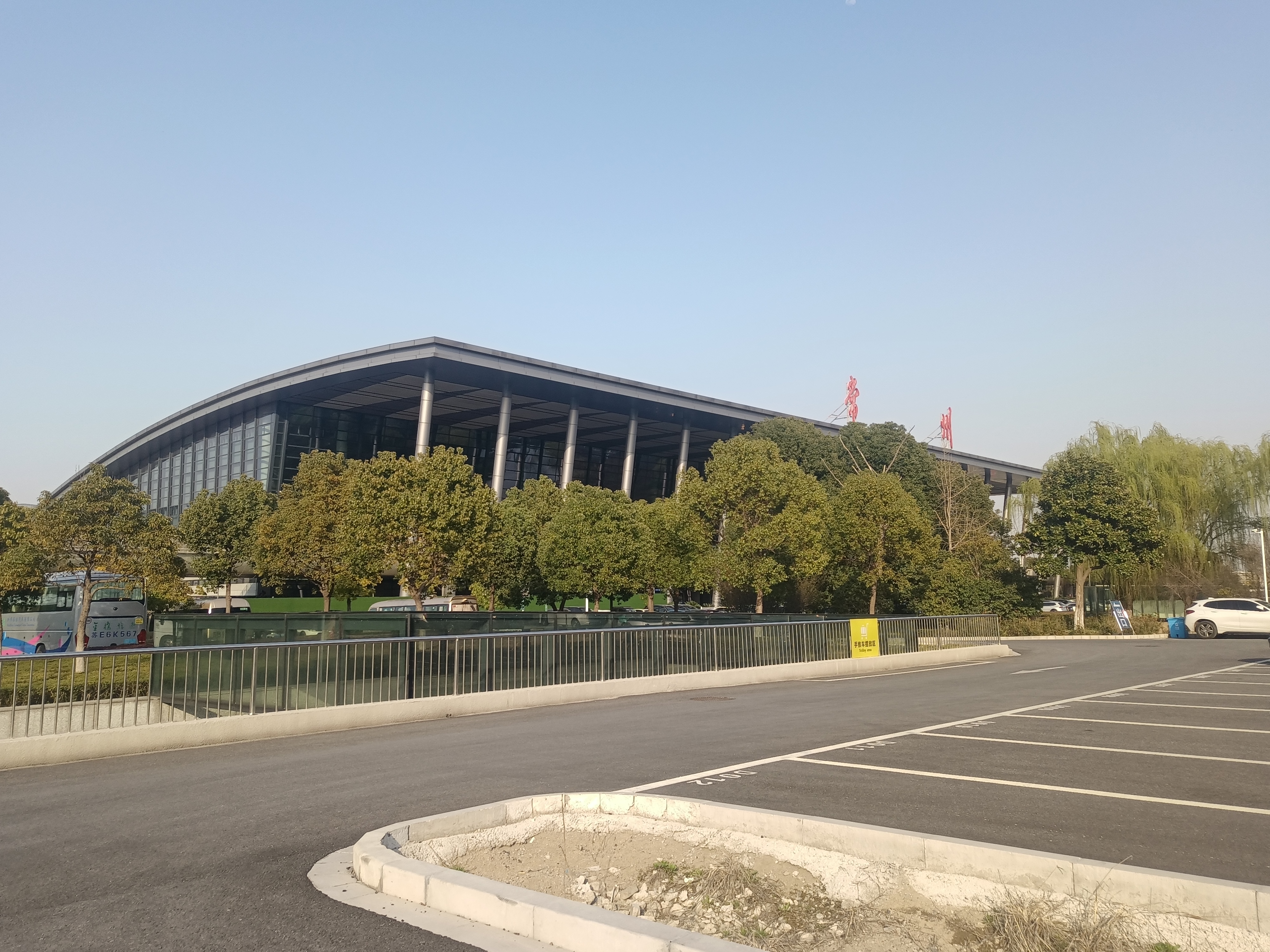
- Changzhou Benniu Airport terminal
- IATA: CZX; ICAO: ZSCG

Summary
- Airport type: Public / military
- Owner/Operator: Eastern Airport Group Co., Ltd.
- Serves: Changzhou and Zhenjiang
- Location: Luoxi Town, Xinbei, Changzhou, Jiangsu, China
- Opened: 15 March 1986; 40 years ago
- Built: 1963; 63 years ago
- Coordinates: 31°54′46″N 119°46′56″E
- Website: czjc.changzhou.gov.cn

Maps
- CAAC airport chart
- Location in Jiangsu CZX/ZSCG (China)

Runways
Direction	Length		Surface
Direction	m	ft	Surface
11/29	3,400	11,155	Concrete

Statistics (2025)
- Passengers: 5,139,214
- Aircraft movements: 49,410
- Cargo (metric tons): 23,208.1
- Source: CAAC

Changzhou Benniu International Airport
- Simplified Chinese: 常州奔牛国际机场
- Traditional Chinese: 常州奔牛國際機場
Transcriptions
Standard Mandarin
- Hanyu Pinyin: Chángzhōu Bēnniú Guójì Jīchǎng

Changzhou Benniu International Airport (IATA: CZX, ICAO: ZSCG) is located at the boundary between Luoxi Town (罗溪镇) in Xinbei District, Changzhou, and Lücheng Town (吕城镇) in Danyang, Zhenjiang, Jiangsu Province. It lies about 18 km from downtown Changzhou and roughly 3 km from the nearest G42 Shanghai–Chengdu Expressway interchange. Nearby alternate airports include Sunan Shuofang International Airport (78 km), Nanjing Lukou International Airport (110 km), and Shanghai Hongqiao International Airport (174 km).

Changzhou Benniu International Airport is a dual-use military–civil facility. Originally constructed for the People's Liberation Army Navy's East Sea Fleet, it opened to civil aviation on 15 March 1986. The airport currently has a 3,400‑meter runway and is classified as a 4E‑grade flight area, capable of accommodating wide‑body aircraft.

== Airlines and destinations ==
Airlines	Destinations
Air China	Beijing–Capital, Chengdu–Tianfu
Air Macau	Macau
Chengdu Airlines	Chengdu–Tianfu, Mianyang, Shenyang
China Eastern Airlines	Beijing–Daxing, Changsha, Chengdu–Tianfu, Chongqing, Dalian, Guangzhou, Jieyang, Kunming, Shenyang, Taiyuan, Weihai, Xiamen, Xi'an, Yantai, Zhuhai
China Express Airlines	Chongqing, Ganzhou
China Southern Airlines	Guangzhou, Jieyang, Shenzhen
Colorful Guizhou Airlines	Guiyang
HK Express	Hong Kong
Kunming Airlines	Kunming
Lao Airlines	Vientiane
LJ Air	Harbin, Huizhou, Taiyuan
Loong Air	Dalian, Fuzhou, Xi'an, Yinchuan
Qingdao Airlines	Changchun
Ruili Airlines	Guiyang, Lijiang, Mangshi
Shandong Airlines	Guiyang, Hohhot, Qingdao, Xiamen
Shenzhen Airlines	Changchun, Dalian, Guangzhou, Haikou, Harbin, Nanning, Quanzhou, Shenyang, Shenzhen
Sichuan Airlines	Chengdu–Shuangliu, Chengdu–Tianfu, Chongqing, Kunming
Spring Airlines	Ankang, Dalian, Jieyang, Lanzhou, Shenyang
West Air	Chongqing
XiamenAir	Fuzhou, Jinzhou
Xizang Airlines	Dali, Lhasa, Mianyang, Yibin

== See also ==
- List of airports in China
