= Yiwu Airport =

Airport serving Yiwu, Zhejiang, China

Yiwu Airport 义乌机场
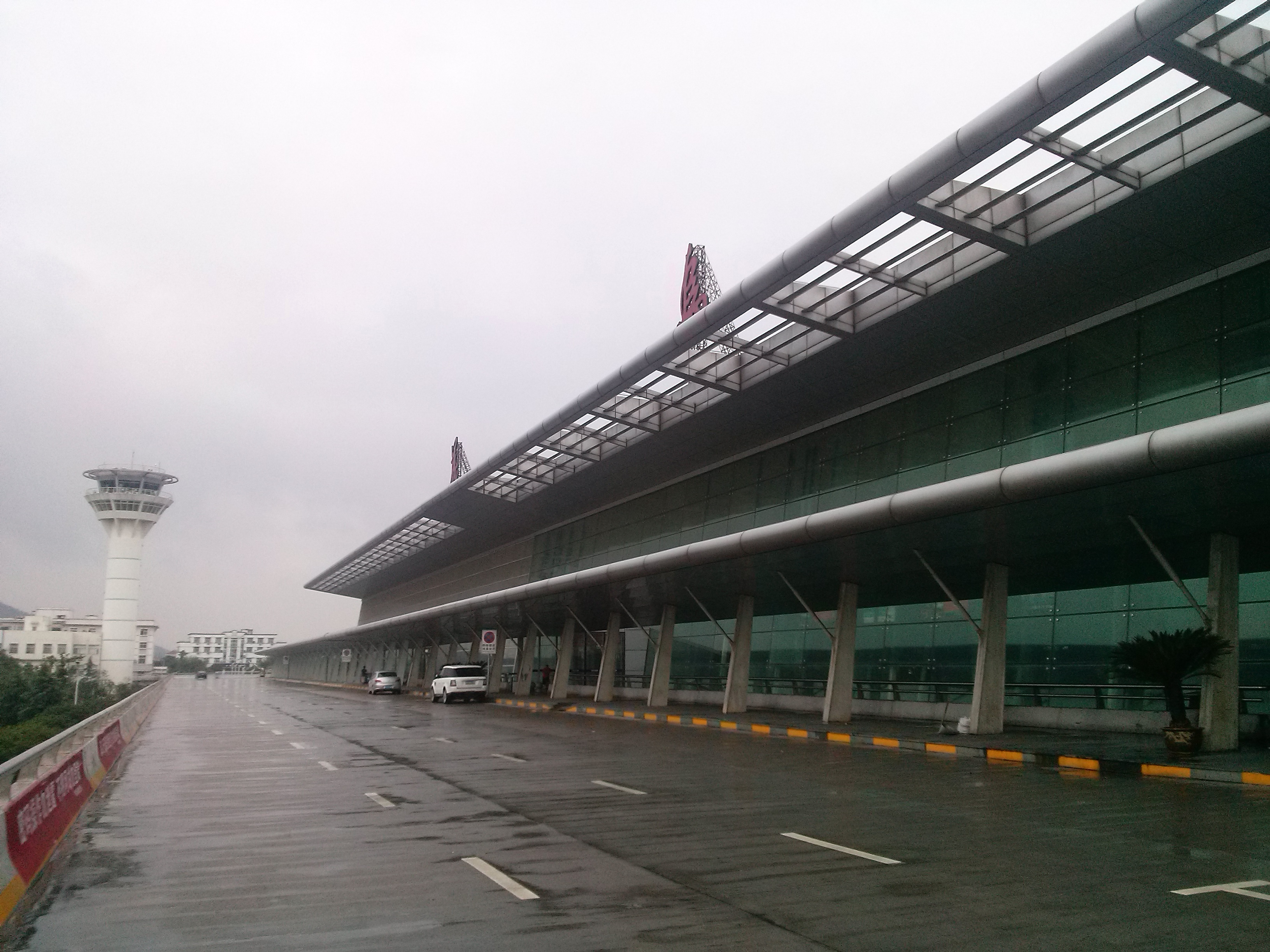
- IATA: YIW; ICAO: ZSYW

Summary
- Airport type: Public / Military
- Serves: Yiwu; Jinhua
- Location: Yiwu, Zhejiang, China
- Opened: 1 April 1991; 35 years ago
- Coordinates: 29°20′41″N 120°01′56″E

Map
- Location in Zhejiang YIW/ZSYW (China)

Runways
Direction	Length		Surface
Direction	m	ft	Surface
02/20	3,000	9,843	Concrete

Statistics (2025)
- Passengers: 3,684,507
- Aircraft movements: 28,234
- Cargo (metric tons): 24,386.9
- Source: List of the busiest airports in the People's Republic of China

Yiwu Airport
- Simplified Chinese: 义乌机场
- Traditional Chinese: 義烏機場
Transcriptions
Standard Mandarin
- Hanyu Pinyin: Yìwū Jīchǎng

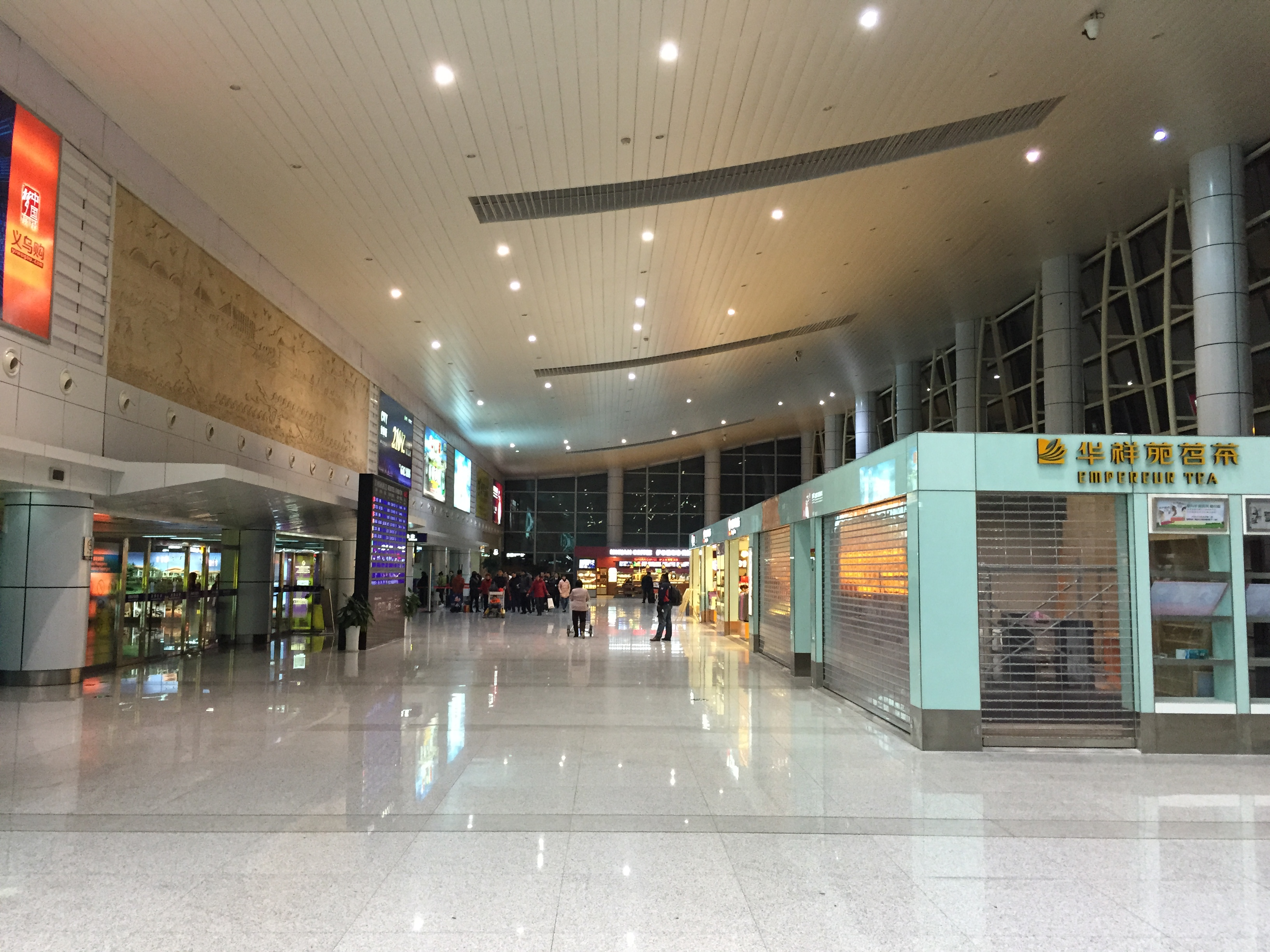
Domestic departure hall

Yiwu Airport (IATA: YIW, ICAO: ZSYW) is a dual-use military and civil airport serving the cities of Yiwu and Jinhua in East China's Zhejiang province. It is located 5.5 km (3.4 mi) northwest of the center of Yiwu and 51 km (32 mi) from the urban area of Jinhua.

== History ==
Yiwu Airport began construction in 1970 and was originally a secondary naval training airfield. In 1988, with approval from the State Council and the Central Military Commission, it became a dual‑use military and civilian airport, and it opened to civil aviation on 1 April 1991. In December 1993, the airport underwent a 100-million yuan expansion, and after entering service at the end of December 1994, it was capable of handling aircraft such as the B737 and MD‑82.

In 2006, Yiwu Airport launched a major terminal‑area expansion project, including a new passenger terminal, an air‑traffic‑control building, and supporting facilities such as communications, firefighting, power supply, wastewater treatment, office space, and living quarters. The project costed 300 million yuan. Construction began on 22 October 2006 and the new facilities entered service on 10 April 2009.

On 6 January 2012, the international terminal project officially began. It included a 13,436 m² international terminal, a 1,879 m² cargo warehouse, and three Class‑C aircraft stands. The project also involved upgrading the existing 14,157 m² apron, a 200.4‑meter elevated roadway, and a 4,687.5 m² parking lot. The new international terminal was designed with two levels to separate arriving and departing passengers and was scheduled to enter service in October 2013.

On 6 August 2014, the State Council approved the opening of Yiwu Airport as an international port of entry.

In 2015, the airport began upgrading its airfield area: extending the runway 500 meters southward to reach 3,000 meters, widening the runway strip 60 meters to the east, constructing an 850‑meter civil aviation parallel taxiway, reinforcing the runway, apron, and taxiways, and upgrading communications, navigation, drainage, and perimeter systems. The project was completed and commissioned on 13 November 2017, and the airport was upgraded to Class 4D.

On 25 December 2025, Yiwu Airport began providing approach‑control services and was incorporated into the Hangzhou approach‑control area.

== Facilities ==
Yiwu Airport had a runway that was 2,500 meters long and 45 meters wide, and an 18,000 square-meter terminal building. It is capable of handling 1 million passengers per year. In 2015, construction began to extend the runway by 500 meters and to build a parallel taxiway. The new 3,000-meter runway was opened on 13 November 2017, making the airport class 4D.

== International terminal ==
On 6 January 2012, construction commenced for a new international terminal. The project includes a 13,436 square-meter terminal building, three additional aircraft parking bays, expansion of car park, and building of new roads and bridges. The new terminal was opened in 2014.

== Airlines and destinations ==
Airlines	Destinations
Air China	Beijing–Capital, Chengdu–Tianfu
China Eastern Airlines	Kunming, Shanghai–Pudong, Wuhan, Xi'an
China Southern Airlines	Bazhong, Beijing–Daxing, Changchun, Changsha, Chengdu–Tianfu, Chongqing, Guangzhou, Guiyang, Haikou, Jieyang, Sanya, Shenyang, Shenzhen, Taiyuan, Tianjin, Urumqi, Wuhan, Xi'an, Zhengzhou, Zhuhai
China United Airlines	Beijing–Daxing, Shijiazhuang
Chongqing Airlines	Chongqing
Colorful Guizhou Airlines	Chengdu–Tianfu, Chongqing, Guiyang, Yibin
Donghai Airlines	Shenzhen
HK Express	Hong Kong

=== Cargo ===
Airlines	Destinations
Central Airlines	Manila
China Postal Airlines	Osaka–Kansai

== See also ==
- List of airports in China
- List of the busiest airports in China
- List of People's Liberation Army Air Force airbases
