= Chongqing Jiangbei International Airport =

International airport serving Chongqing, China

Chongqing Jiangbei International Airport 重庆江北国际机场
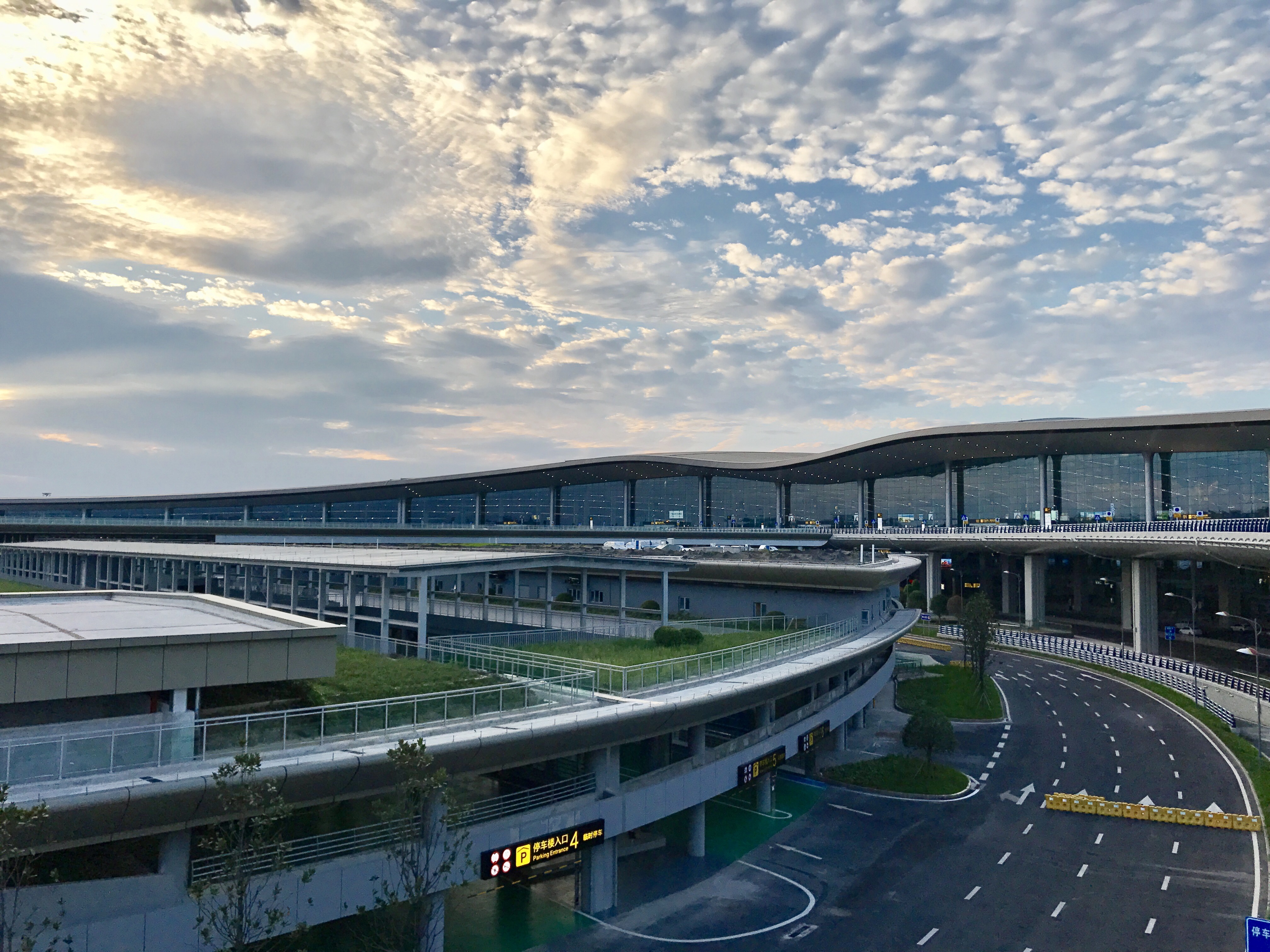
- IATA: CKG; ICAO: ZUCK

Summary
- Airport type: Public
- Owner: Chongqing Municipal People's Government
- Operator: Chongqing Airport Group Co., Ltd
- Serves: Chongqing
- Location: Liangjiang, Chongqing, China
- Opened: 22 January 1990; 36 years ago
- Hub for: China Express Airlines; China Southern Airlines; Chongqing Airlines; Hainan Airlines; Sichuan Airlines; West Air
- Focus city for: Air China; Shandong Airlines; Tianjin Airlines; XiamenAir
- Elevation AMSL: 416 m (1,365 ft)
- Coordinates: 29°43′09″N 106°38′30″E
- Website: www.cqa.cn

Maps
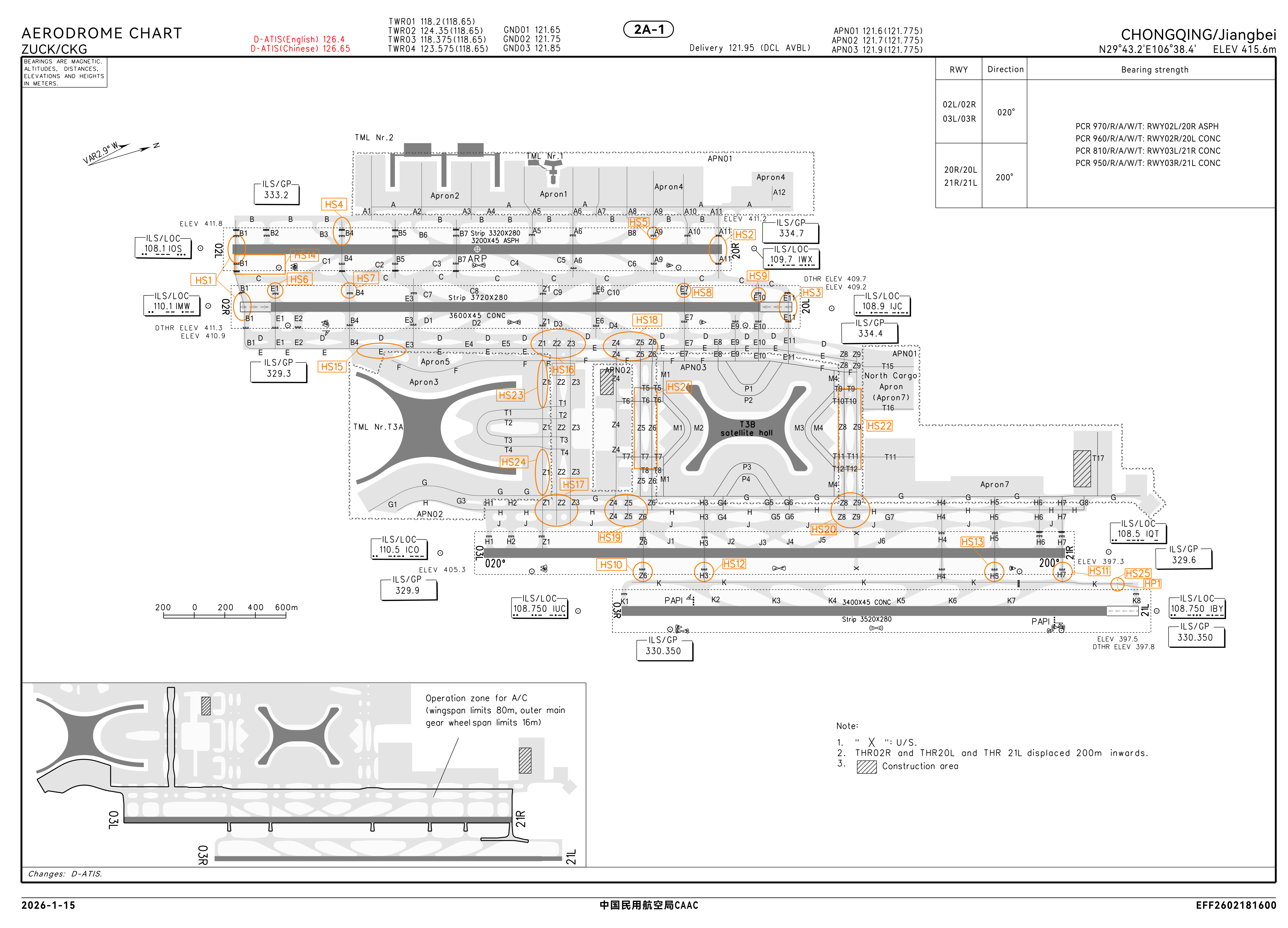
- CAAC airport chart

- Location in Chongqing Location in China

Runways
| Direction | Length | | Surface |
| Direction | m | ft | Surface |
|---|---|---|---|
| 02L/20R | 3,200 | 10,499 | Asphalt |
| 02R/20L | 3,600 | 11,811 | Concrete |
| 03L/21R | 3,800 | 12,467 | Concrete |
| 03R/21L | 3,400 | 11,155 | Concrete |

Statistics (2025)
- Passengers: 50,094,770
- Aircraft movements: 335,919
- Cargo (in tonnes): 548,485.3
- Source: List of the busiest airports in China

Chongqing Jiangbei International Airport
- Simplified Chinese: 重庆江北国际机场
- Traditional Chinese: 重慶江北國際機場
Transcriptions
Standard Mandarin
- Hanyu Pinyin: Chóngqìng Jiāngběi Guójì Jīchǎng

Chongqing Jiangbei International Airport (IATA: CKG, ICAO: ZUCK) is the main international airport serving the city of Chongqing in Southwestern China. It is located in Liangjiang, Chongqing, about 19 kilometres (12 mi) north of Chongqing city center.

The airport is a major aviation hub for airlines in western China, including China Express, China Southern (through its subsidiary Chongqing Airlines), Hainan Airlines, Sichuan Airlines and West Air. Chongqing is a focus city for Air China, Shandong Airlines, Tianjin Airlines and XiamenAir.

Jiangbei Airport has undergone multiple major expansions. The latest expansion involves a new satellite terminal (Terminal 3B) and a fourth runway, both of which have finished construction as of 2025. The first, second, and third phases of the airport came into operation in January 1990, December 2004, and December 2010, respectively. Terminal 2 is capable of handling 15 million passengers and Terminal 3A 45 million passengers annually.

It was the 9th busiest airport in mainland China by passenger traffic in 2025. Jiangbei Airport was awarded the best airport in its size category by Airports Council International in 2017 and again in 2018.

== History ==
The civil aviation of Chongqing dates back to the 1920s. After the completion of Baishiyi Airport in 1938, Chongqing became one of the four cities in China that had an airport in operation. In 1950, four flight routes from Tianjin, Chengdu, Guangzhou and Kunming to Chongqing became the earliest to be opened after the establishment of the People's Republic of China in 1949. In 1965, the Civil Aviation Administration of China opened an office in Sichuan Province and Chongqing Airport became subject to it. The development of Chongqing's civil aviation then stopped until the 1990s.

On 22 January 1990, the new airport, Chongqing Jiangbei Airport was opened to replace the old Baishiyi Airport's commercial flight functions, which remained open as a military airport. The development of the civil aviation resumed. In 1997, when the Chongqing area became a 4th municipality of China, Civil Aviation Administration of China established a branch in Chongqing in the same year.

== Terminals ==
Chongqing Jiangbei International Airport contains three terminals: Terminal 1 (currently closed), Terminal 2A and 2B (domestic services), and Terminal 3A (domestic and international services). Terminals 1 and 2 are situated along the western perimeter of the airport, while the larger, newer Terminal 3A is located farther southeast of the former two. CRT line 10 and free terminal shuttle bus provide services between Terminal 2 and 3A.

- Terminal 1 (T1) was the original passenger terminal building when Jiangbei Airport was first opened in 1990. It handled international services until its closure in August 2017.
- Terminal 2 (T2A/T2B) contains two concourses (hence 2A and 2B). Concourse B was opened in 2004 (then referred to simply as T2) and Concourse A in 2010. The terminal has 30 gates and annual passenger capacity of 37 million. It currently handles domestic services. It offers concourse access to CRT Terminal 2 of Jiangbei Airport Station which is serviced by CRT Lines 3 and 10.
- Terminal 3A (T3A) was opened in August 2017. The terminal is the largest of the three and has 66 gates. It has annual passenger capacity of 45 million. It currently handles domestic services and all international services. It offers concourse access to CRT Terminal 3 of Jiangbei Airport Station which is serviced by CRT Line 10.
- Terminal 3B (T3B) was constructed as part of the fifth phase expansion project of the airport. It entered service in April 2025. As a satellite terminal, it is connected to Terminal 3A via an underground monorail line which acts as the airport's automated people mover system; passengers departing from T3B go through check-in formalities and security check at T3A before taking the APM to T3B, while passengers arriving at T3B take the APM to T3A for baggage claim. Terminal 3B exclusively serve domestic flights; international flights remain at Terminal 3A.

== Development ==
Chongqing Jiangbei International Airport is currently undergoing a major expansion, with a vision of obtaining a major international air hub and becoming the largest airport in western China by 2030. Jiangbei Airport has been outlined ambitious growth plans, competing with Chengdu Airport, Kunming Airport, Wuhan Airport and Xi'an Airport to be recognized as the nation's fourth largest aviation hub (after those hubs in Beijing, Shanghai, and Guangzhou).

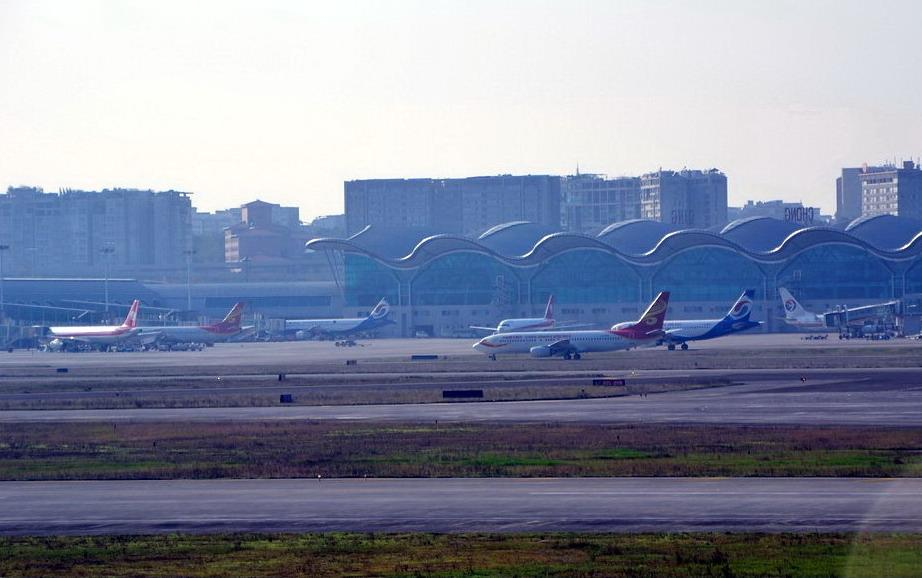
Aircraft movement is increasing rapidly post-2011 at Chongqing Jiangbei International Airport.

=== Airport expansion ===
The expansion project Phase III, which included a second runway and an additional Terminal, T2A, started construction in 2007 and completed in 2010. Major elements of the construction were adding a second runway of 3,200 meters (10,498 ft 8 in) (which was later lengthened to 3,600 meters (11,811 ft 0 in) to satisfy the landings and takeoffs of Boeing 747 and the demands of Hewlett-Packard Development Company, L.P.) to the east of the existing runway, building a parallel taxiway in between the two runways, and setting up a visual aid lighting support system. It also added a second terminal building (T2A) with an area of 86,000 square meters (930,000 sq ft), 41 apron aircraft parking stands, and a freight station and support facilities occupying an area of 20,000 square meters (220,000 ft^{2}). It cost CNY3.3 billion (US$538 million).

Phase IV (dubbed the Eastern Expansion) - of Jiangbei Airport has been the biggest and contains the construction of a third runway and a new terminal, T3A, being 530,000 square meters (5,700,000 sq ft), more than double the size of the existing terminals (T1 and T2A/T2B) combined, costing CNY27.0 billion (US$4 billion). The fourth phase of the expansion project was completed in August 2017.

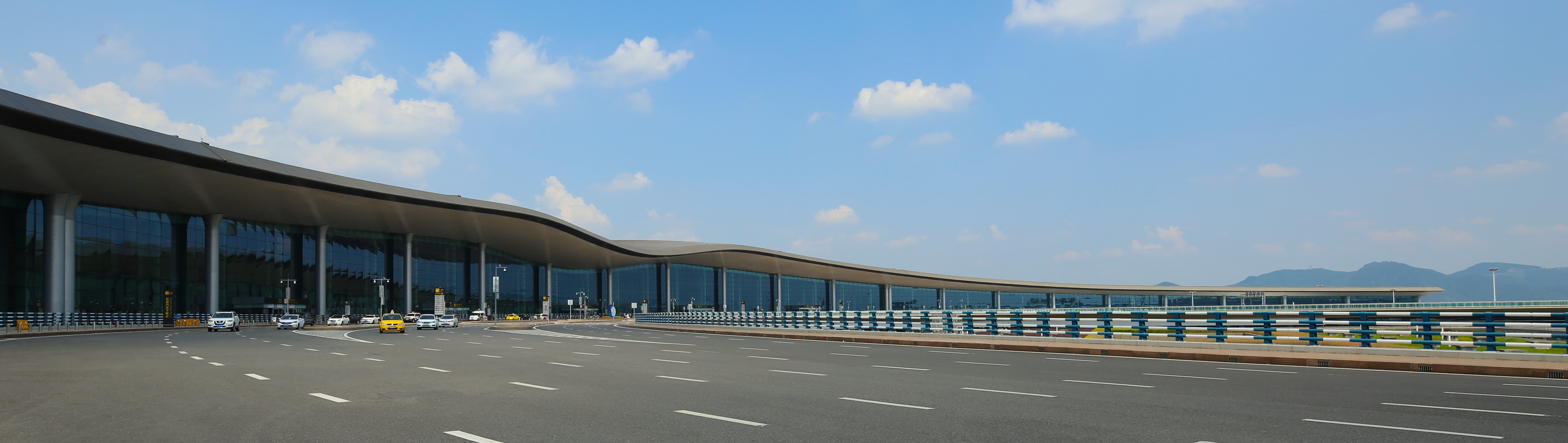
Departure Level of Terminal 3

The fifth phase of expansion for Jiangbei Airport is the most recent, and final major expansion for the airport. It includes a new satellite terminal, namely T3B, a fourth runway, expanded remote aircraft stands and cargo facilities. The satellite terminal is designed by Zaha Hadid Architects and CSWADI, with interior design later updated by Nordic Office of Architecture. It is the world's largest standalone satellite hall and second largest satellite terminal overall. The terminal is connected via underground air-side monorail, maintained and operated by Chongqing Rail Transit. In November 2020, the fifth phase of the Chongqing Airport expansion project commenced construction. After four years of construction, the fourth runway of Chongqing Jiangbei Airport was officially put into use at the end of 2024, and the new terminal building was put into use in April 2025.

Phases for the expansion of Chongqing Jiangbei International Airport
| Phase | Date of inauguration | Terminals | | Runways (direction, ref. code) | Number of bays | | | Passenger capacity | |
| Phase | Date of inauguration | Constituents | Areas (sq m) | Runways (direction, ref. code) | Aerobridges | Remote* | Total | Total | International |
|---|---|---|---|---|---|---|---|---|---|
| I | 22 January 1990 | T1 | 16,000 | #1 (02/20, 4E) | 6 | 25 | 31 | 1,000,000 | - |
| II | 12 December 2004 | T1, T2B | 104,900 | #1 (02/20, 4E) | 24 | 26 | 50 | 7,000,000 | - |
| III | 21 December 2010 | T1, T2A/T2B | 181,900 | #1 (02L/20R, 4E) #2 (02R/20L, 4E) | 36 | 49 | 85 | 30,000,000 | 2,100,000 |
| IV | 29 August 2017 | T1, T2A/T2B, T3A | 718,900 | #1 (02L/20R, 4E) #2 (02R/20L, 4E) #3 (03/21, 4F) | 98 | 81 | 179 | 60,000,000 | 10,000,000 |
| V | Expected 2022 | T1, T2A/T2B, T3A/T3B | 1,068,900 | #1 (02L/20R, 4E) #2 (02R/20L, 4E) #3 (03L/21R, 4F) #4 (03R/21L, 4F) | 165 | - | - | 70,000,000 | 14,000,000 |

Note: Remote bays include the ones that serve the air freighters.

=== Surge in cargo traffic ===
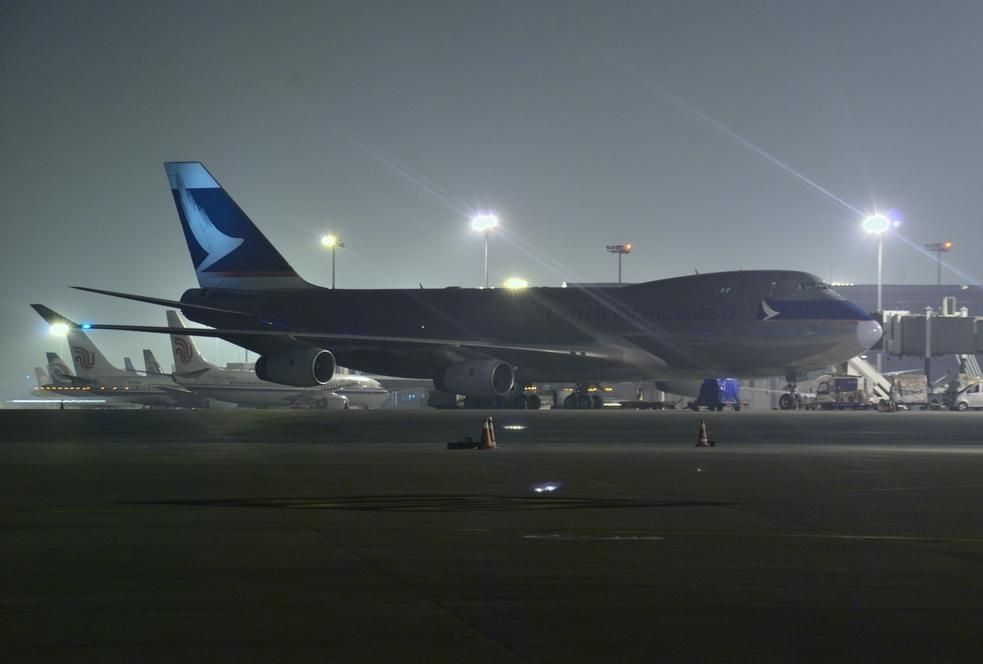
Cathay Pacific Cargo Boeing 747-400F aircraft at Chongqing Jiangbei International Airport

Cargo traffic increased at an average rate of 14% in the first six months of 2011, driven by exponential growth in international cargo. International cargo/mail volumes increased by 12 times from 2010 levels in the first half of 2011, to more than 9000 tonnes. In the second half of 2011, this growth rate is expected to be maintained, with Hewlett-Packard, Asus and other brands of large international IT production capacity supporting the increase, to an anticipated 60,000 to 80,000 tonnes of international cargo throughout the whole year.

=== New international routes ===
Before 2010, Chongqing Jiangbei International Airport's international destinations all terminated in East and Southeast Asia, including direct flights to Tokyo (has stop-over in Beijing or Shanghai), Seoul, Singapore, Bangkok, Phuket, Siem Reap, etc. In 2011, Qatar Airways opened a new route to Doha. Finnair's services to Helsinki were later added in 2012.

With the new Terminal 3A in operation since August 2017, the airport has had multiple new international routes with non-stop flights to London, Dubai, Sydney, Rome, Milan, Paris, Budapest, etc. T3A and the third runway of Chongqing Jiangbei International Airport started operation at 06:00 on 29 August 2017. In the meantime, T1 was temporarily closed, T2 serve only domestic flights operated by Sichuan Airlines, West Airlines, China Express and Spring Airlines, and the remaining flights were transferred to T3A. In addition, the airport operates a free trans-shipment shuttle between T2 and T3A in a 24-hour operation.

=== Statistics ===
| Year | Passengers | | Ranking by PAX | | Cargo | | Aircraft operations | |
| Year | Number | Increase | Domestic | Global | Tons | Increase | Number | Increase |
|---|---|---|---|---|---|---|---|---|
| 2000 | 2,780,359 | ▲13.3% | 11 | - | 62,214.5 | ▲2.2% | 36,405 | ▲1.4% |
| 2001 | 3,192,759 | ▲14.8% | 11 | - | 64,597.1 | ▲3.8% | 41,192 | ▲13.1% |
| 2002 | 3,865,788 | ▲21.1% | 12 | - | 71,464.9 | ▲10.6% | 49,012 | ▲19.0% |
| 2003 | 4,287,505 | ▲10.9% | 12 | - | 76,921.5 | ▲7.6% | 56,108 | ▲14.5% |
| 2004 | 5,233,774 | ▲22.1% | 12 | - | 87,568.0 | ▲13.8% | 64,750 | ▲15.4% |
| 2005 | 6,631,420 | ▲26.7% | 11 | - | 100,909.9 | ▲15.2% | 72,674 | ▲12.2% |
| 2006 | 8,050,007 | ▲21.4% | 10 | - | 120,178.3 | ▲19.1% | 88,929 | ▲22.4% |
| 2007 | 10,355,730 | ▲28.6% | 10 | - | 143,472.4 | ▲19.4% | 105,092 | ▲18.2% |
| 2008 | 11,138,432 | ▲7.6% | 10 | - | 160,256.4 | ▲11.7% | 112,565 | ▲7.1% |
| 2009 | 14,038,045 | ▲26.0% | 10 | 91 | 186,005.9 | ▲16.1% | 132,619 | ▲17.8% |
| 2010 | 15,802,334 | ▲12.6% | 10 | 90 | 195,686.6 | ▲5.2% | 145,705 | ▲9.9% |
| 2011 | 19,052,706 | ▲20.6% | 9 | 76 | 237,572.5 | ▲21.4% | 166,763 | ▲14.5% |
| 2012 | 22,057,003 | ▲15.8% | 9 | 70 | 268,642.4 | ▲13.1% | 195,333 | ▲17.1% |
| 2013 | 25,272,039 | ▲14.6% | 9 | 62 | 280,149.8 | ▲4.3% | 214,574 | ▲9.9% |
| 2014 | 29,264,363 | ▲15.8% | 8 | 57 | 302,335.8 | ▲7.9% | 238,085 | ▲11.0% |
| 2015 | 32,402,196 | ▲10.7% | 9 | - | 318,781.5 | ▲5.4% | 254,360 | ▲7.4% |
| 2016 | 35,888,819 | ▲10.8% | 9 | 54 | 361,091.0 | ▲13.3% | 276,807 | ▲8.4% |
| 2017 | 38,715,210 | ▲7.9% | 9 | 51 | 366,278.3 | ▲1.4% | 288,598 | ▲4.3% |
| 2018 | 41,595,887 | ▲7.4% | 9 | - | 382,160.8 | ▲4.3% | 300,745 | ▲4.2% |

Source: CAAC (Civil Aviation Administration of China)

Number of domestic and international/regional passengers (bar chart, 2009–2018)

- International/regional
- Domestic

Source: CQA (Chongqing Airport Group Co., Ltd.)

== Airlines and destinations ==
=== Passenger ===
| Airlines | Destinations |
|---|---|
| 9 Air | Guangzhou |
| Air China | Beijing–Capital, Beijing–Daxing, Budapest, Changchun, Changsha, Dali, Dubai–International, Fuzhou, Guangzhou, Haikou, Hailar, Hangzhou, Harbin, Hefei, Ho Chi Minh City, Hohhot, Hong Kong, Jiaxing, Lhasa, Manila, Nanchang, Nanjing, Ningbo, Sanya, Seoul–Incheon, Shanghai–Hongqiao, Shanghai–Pudong, Shenyang, Shenzhen, Singapore, Taipei–Songshan, Taipei–Taoyuan, Tashkent, Tianjin, Tokyo–Narita, Ürümqi, Wenzhou, Wuhan, Xiamen, Yinchuan, Yuncheng, Zhanjiang, Zhengzhou, Zhuhai |
| Air Guilin | Guilin, Tangshan, Wuhu |
| Air Macau | Macau |
| AirAsia X | Kuala Lumpur–International |
| Asiana Airlines | Seoul–Incheon |
| Beijing Capital Airlines | Guangzhou, Haikou, Hangzhou, Nanjing, Shenyang |
| Cambodia Airways | Phnom Penh |
| Cathay Pacific | Hong Kong |
| Chengdu Airlines | Barkol Fuzhou |
| China Airlines | Kaohsiung, Taipei-Taoyuan |
| China Eastern Airlines | Baise, Beijing–Daxing, Changzhou, Guangzhou, Hefei, Jinan, Kunming, Nanjing, Ningbo, Qingdao, Shanghai–Hongqiao, Shanghai–Pudong, Shenzhen, Taiyuan, Weihai, Wuhan, Wuxi, Xi'an, Xinyang |
| China Express Airlines | Aksu, Baotou, Beihai, Changzhi, Changzhou, Chifeng, Chizhou, Dalian, Dongying, Dunhuang, Ganzhou, Hailar, Hami, Handan, Hohhot, Jiayuguan, Jinchang, Jingzhou, Korla, Lanzhou, Lianyungang, Linfen, Liuzhou, Lüliang, Mianyang, Ningbo, Ordos, Qionghai, Quanzhou, Quzhou, Sanming, Shenyang, Shijiazhuang, Shiyan, Taizhou, Tianjin, Tongliao, Ulanqab, Vientiane, Weifang, Wenzhou, Wuhai, Xichang, Xilinhot, Xingyi, Xuzhou, Yan'an, Yancheng, Yibin, Yinchuan, Zhanjiang, Zhengzhou, Zhoushan, Zunyi–Maotai |
| China Southern Airlines | Beijing–Daxing, Changchun, Changsha, Dalian, Guangzhou, Haikou, Harbin, Jieyang, Lhasa, Nanning, Shenyang, Shenzhen, Tianjin, Tongliao, Ürümqi, Wuhan, Yiwu, Zhengzhou, Zhuhai |
| China United Airlines | Wenzhou |
| Chongqing Airlines | Aksu, Bangkok–Suvarnabhumi, Beijing–Daxing, Changchun, Changsha, Colombo–Bandaranaike, Dali, Dalian, Diqing, Fuzhou, Guangzhou, Haikou, Hangzhou, Ho Chi Minh City, Harbin, Hohhot, Hong Kong, Huizhou, Jieyang, Kashgar, Korla, Kota Kinabalu, Kunming, Lhasa, Linyi, Malé, Nanjing, Ningbo, Nyingchi, Penang, Qingdao, Sanya, Shanghai–Pudong, Shenzhen, Singapore, Taizhou, Tongliao, Ürümqi, Wenzhou, Wuhan, Wuhu, Wushan, Xiamen, Xishuangbanna, Yining, Yiwu, Zhengzhou, Zhuhai |
| Colorful Guizhou Airlines | Ningbo, Yiwu, Yueyang |
| Donghai Airlines | Nantong, Quanzhou, Shenzhen, Shiyan, Yueyang |
| Firefly | Seasonal: Johor Bahru; Charter: Penang |
| FlyArystan | Almaty |
| Fuzhou Airlines | Fuzhou |
| GX Airlines | Jining, Yulin (Shaanxi) |
| Hainan Airlines | Auckland, Bangkok–Suvarnabhumi, Beijing–Capital, Brussels, Changsha, Fuzhou, Guangzhou, Haikou, Hangzhou, Harbin, Kuala Lumpur–International, Madrid, Milan–Malpensa, Osaka–Kansai, Paris–Charles de Gaulle, Rome–Fiumicino, Sanya, Seattle/Tacoma, Shanghai–Pudong, Shenzhen, Ürümqi, Wenzhou, Xiamen, Xi'an, Yinchuan |
| Hebei Airlines | Beijing–Daxing, Qingyang, Shenyang, Shijiazhuang |
| Himalaya Airlines | Kathmandu |
| Hong Kong Airlines | Hong Kong |
| Jiangxi Air | Nanchang |
| Juneyao Air | Nanjing, Shanghai–Hongqiao, Shanghai–Pudong, Wuxi |
| Kunming Airlines | Taiyuan, Tengchong |
| LJ Air | Harbin, Yinchuan |
| Loong Air | Changchun, Hangzhou, Heze,, Jiaxing, Ningbo, Xiangyang |
| Lucky Air | Huai'an, Kunming, Lijiang, Xishuangbanna |
| Okay Airways | Changsha, Haikou, Nanning, Tianjin, Xingyi, Yinchuan |
| Qatar Airways | Doha |
| Qingdao Airlines | Changchun, Luoyang, Shenyang, Yantai |
| Ruili Airlines | Mangshi, Taiyuan |
| Shandong Airlines | Beijing–Capital, Changchun, Dalian, Harbin, Hohhot, Jinan, Mudanjiang, Nanjing, Qingdao, Shanghai–Hongqiao, Shenyang, Taiyuan, Xiamen, Yanji, Yantai, Zhuhai |
| Shanghai Airlines | Shanghai–Hongqiao, Shanghai–Pudong |
| Shenzhen Airlines | Guangzhou, Nanchang, Nanjing, Nanning, Nantong, Shenzhen, Wuxi |
| Sichuan Airlines | Beihai, Beijing–Capital, Changsha, Changzhou, Dalian, Fuzhou, Guangzhou, Haikou, Hangzhou, Harbin, Hefei, Jieyang, Jinan, Krabi, Kuala Lumpur–International, Kunming, Lanzhou, Lhasa, Lijiang, Nanchang, Nanjing, Ningbo, Phuket, Qingdao, Sanya, Shanghai–Pudong, Shennongjia, Shenyang, Shenzhen, Taipei–Songshan, Taiyuan, Tianjin, Ürümqi, Wenzhou, Wuhan, Wuhu, Wuxi, Xiamen, Xi'an, Xining, Xishuangbanna, Yangzhou, Yantai, Yinchuan, Zhengzhou, Zhongwei, Zhoushan, Zhuhai |
| Singapore Airlines | Singapore |
| Spring Airlines | Jinggangshan, Ningbo, Shanghai–Hongqiao, Shanghai–Pudong, Shenyang, Shenzhen, Shijiazhuang, Yancheng, Yangzhou |
| Suparna Airlines | Shanghai–Pudong |
| Thai AirAsia | Bangkok–Don Mueang |
| Thai Lion Air | Bangkok–Don Mueang |
| Tianjin Airlines | Altay, Changsha, Dunhuang, Hangzhou, Hengyang, Hohhot, Huizhou, London–Heathrow, Moscow–Sheremetyevo, Shangrao, Sydney, Tianjin, Ulanhot, Ürümqi, Xi'an, Yanji, Yulin (Shaanxi), Zhangye |
| Tibet Airlines | Dali, Lhasa, Nyingchi, Pu'er, Qamdo, Xining |
| VietJet Air | Nha Trang |
| West Air | Anqing, Beihai, Changzhou, Chenzhou, Chiang Mai, Dali, Fuyang, Fuzhou, Guangzhou, Haikou, Hangzhou, Hanoi, Hefei, Hotan, Huizhou, Jieyang, Jinan, Korla, Kota Kinabalu, Lhasa, Lijiang, Macau, Nanchang, Nanjing, Nyingchi, Penang, Qamdo, Quanzhou, Sanya, Shanghai–Pudong, Shenzhen, Shijiazhuang, Singapore, Taiyuan, Tianjin, Ürümqi, Vientiane, Wenzhou, Xiamen, Xishuangbanna, Yangon, Yichun (Jiangxi), Zhengzhou, Zhongwei, Zhoushan, Zhuhai |
| XiamenAir | Beijing–Daxing, Dalian, Fuzhou, Hangzhou, Jakarta–Soekarno-Hatta, Kuala Lumpur–International, Manila, Osaka–Kansai, Phnom Penh, Quanzhou, Shanghai–Hongqiao, Shenyang, Shenzhen, Tianjin, Wuhan, Xiamen, Xining, Yancheng, Yuncheng |

=== Cargo ===
| Airlines | Destinations |
|---|---|
| AirBridgeCargo Airlines | Moscow–Sheremetyevo (suspended), Zhengzhou (suspended) |
| Air China Cargo | Amsterdam, Frankfurt, Shanghai–Pudong; Charter: Chicago–O'Hare |
| AirZeta | Hanoi, Seoul–Incheon |
| ASL Airlines Belgium | Liège, Shanghai–Pudong |
| Cathay Cargo | Hong Kong, Shanghai–Pudong |
| China Airlines Cargo | Taipei–Taoyuan |
| China Cargo Airlines | Dhaka, Shanghai–Pudong |
| China Southern Cargo | Amsterdam, Shanghai–Pudong |
| Donghai Airlines Cargo | Hong Kong |
| Ethiopian Cargo | Addis Ababa, Delhi, Lagos, Miami, Quito, São Paulo–Guarulhos |
| Etihad Cargo | Abu Dhabi |
| EVA Air Cargo | Taipei–Taoyuan |
| Lufthansa Cargo | Delhi, Frankfurt, Guangzhou, Krasnoyarsk |
| MASkargo | Kuala Lumpur–International |
| Qantas Freight operated by Atlas Air | Chicago–O'Hare, Dallas/Fort Worth, New York–JFK, Sydney |
| Sichuan Airlines Cargo | Bengaluru |
| Suparna Airlines Cargo | Guangzhou, Luxembourg, Moscow–Sheremetyevo, Shanghai–Pudong, Taipei–Taoyuan |

== Ground transportation ==
The airport's ground transportation is developing very fast. Four highways around the airport are either under construction or have been built, as part of plans to turn Chongqing into an integrated regional transport hub in western China. There is a 300,000-square-meter (3,200,000 sq ft) GTC (Ground Transportation Centre) in front of T3A's main terminal building, providing transfer to inter-city rail, metro, buses, long-distance coach and taxis.

General plan of integrated transportation Hub at Chongqing Jiangbei International Airport:

- One inter-city rail: Branch of Chongqing-Wanzhou Inter-City Rail
- Two lines of Chongqing Rail Transit: CRT Line 3 and Line 10
- Three latitudinal roadways: (1) outer ring expressway, (2) relocated National Highway G319, and (3) southern connecting freeway
- Four longitudinal roadways: (1) first freeway of CKG Airport (National Highway G210), (2) second freeway of CKG Airport (under construction), (3) Chongqing-Linshui expressway, and (4) northern connecting roadway

=== Buses ===
==== Airport express bus routes ====
Airport Express lines are easily accessible at Terminals 2 and 3.

- Route K01: Jiangbei Airport → Jiazhou (加州) → Damiao (大庙) → Shangqingsi (上清寺) → Chongqing Great Hall → Jiefangbei. It takes about 50 minutes from the airport to the city centre (Jiefangbei).
- Route K02: Jiangbei Airport → Qixia Road (栖霞路) → North Square of Chongqingbei Railway Station. 40 minutes may be taken from the airport to the High-Speed railway station.
- Route K03: Jiangbei Airport → Yanggongqiao (Shapingba)
- Route K05: Jiangbei Airport → Sigongli Bus Terminal
- Route K06: Jiangbei Airport → Chongqing West Railway Station
- Route K07: Jiangbei Airport → Shapingba Railway Station

==== Long-distance coach services ====
There is a transfer center for long-distance coaches between Terminal 2A and Terminal 2B, and it offers bus services to nearby cities in Sichuan and Guizhou Province, as well as suburban areas of Chongqing Municipality.

=== Freeways and roads ===
There is currently one airport freeway connecting the city center with the airport, and the second one is under construction and will be put into operation in the late 2016. The airport freeway is 23 kilometers long, but it usually takes as many as 30 minutes to get from the city center to the airport because of the heavy traffic.

==== Parking ====
The airport has four parking lots:

- International (Outdoor) Parking Lot, located in front of Terminal 1 (with certain sections transformed into a drive-in cinema since March 2022)
- Domestic (Outdoor) Parking Lot, located in front of Terminal 2
- Underground (Indoor) Parking Lot, located under Terminal 2
- Central Parking Garage, located in the GTC (Ground Transportation Center) in front of Terminal 3

All together, the airport can accommodate about 7,300 cars at one time.

=== Chongqing Rail Transit (CRT) ===
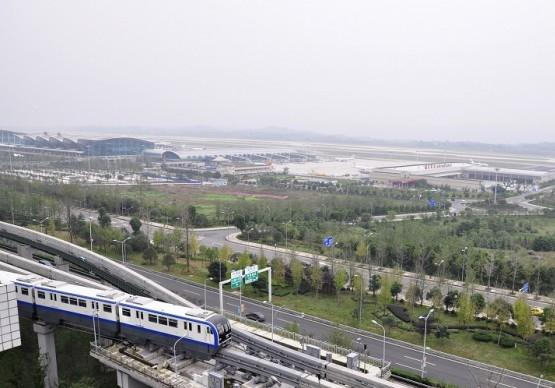
CRT Metro Line 3 seen here departing Bijin, with the Chongqing Jiangbei International airport in the background

Chongqing Rail Transit Line 3 runs from Chongqing Jiangbei International Airport's Terminal 2 station, going through the city center via Lianglukou station and onto its final stop, Yudong, covering a distance of 60 kilometres (37 mi). It takes around 50 minutes to get to the city center (Lianglukou).

Line 10, serves as the second metro line connecting the urban areas of Chongqing and the airport. One station of Line 10 is at Terminal 3 and the other is at Terminal 2. This line runs under Runways #1 (02L/20R) and #2 (02R/20L), connecting Terminal 2 and Terminal 3 in landside. Line 10 is the only metro line access to the new Terminal 3, while Line 3 will not be elongated to Terminal 3. Line 10 also reduces the travel distance between Chongqing Jiangbei International Airport and Chongqingbei Railway Station, which can facilitate the transfers of passengers between air and rail.

=== National Railway and Intercity Trains ===
==== China Railway (Intercity trains) ====
Terminal 3A has a large underground railway station as part of its GTC (Ground Transportation Center). It is adjacent to the Chongqing Rail Transit Line 10 metro station. The railway station opened on 30 December 2022, initially with limited service to stations along the Chongqing Railway Hub East Ring line, forming the Airport Branch of the railway line. It is one stop away from Chongqing North railway station, a major railway station servicing Chongqing.

The station is designed to connect cities as far as 300 kilometers away, thus allowing Chongqing Jiangbei International Airport to serve a significantly larger population. The speed of the trains is designed to be 250 to 300 kilometers per hour, allowing journeys to take less than one hour from a relatively faraway locations within the Chongqing Municipality.

== Other facilities ==
The headquarters of China Express Airlines are on the airport property.

== Incidents ==
- On 12 May 2022, a Tibet Airlines Airbus A319-100, operating as Tibet Airlines Flight 9833 from Chongqing to Nyingchi Mainling Airport in Nyingchi, Tibet, left the runway after an aborted takeoff because of an "abnormality". The planes engines then scraped on the lawn, causing them to break and burst into flames. All 113 passengers and 9 crew members evacuated safely, but 36 of them suffered from minor injuries.

== See also ==
- Chongqing Baishiyi Air Base
- List of airports in the People's Republic of China
