= Dali Fengyi Airport =

Chinese airport

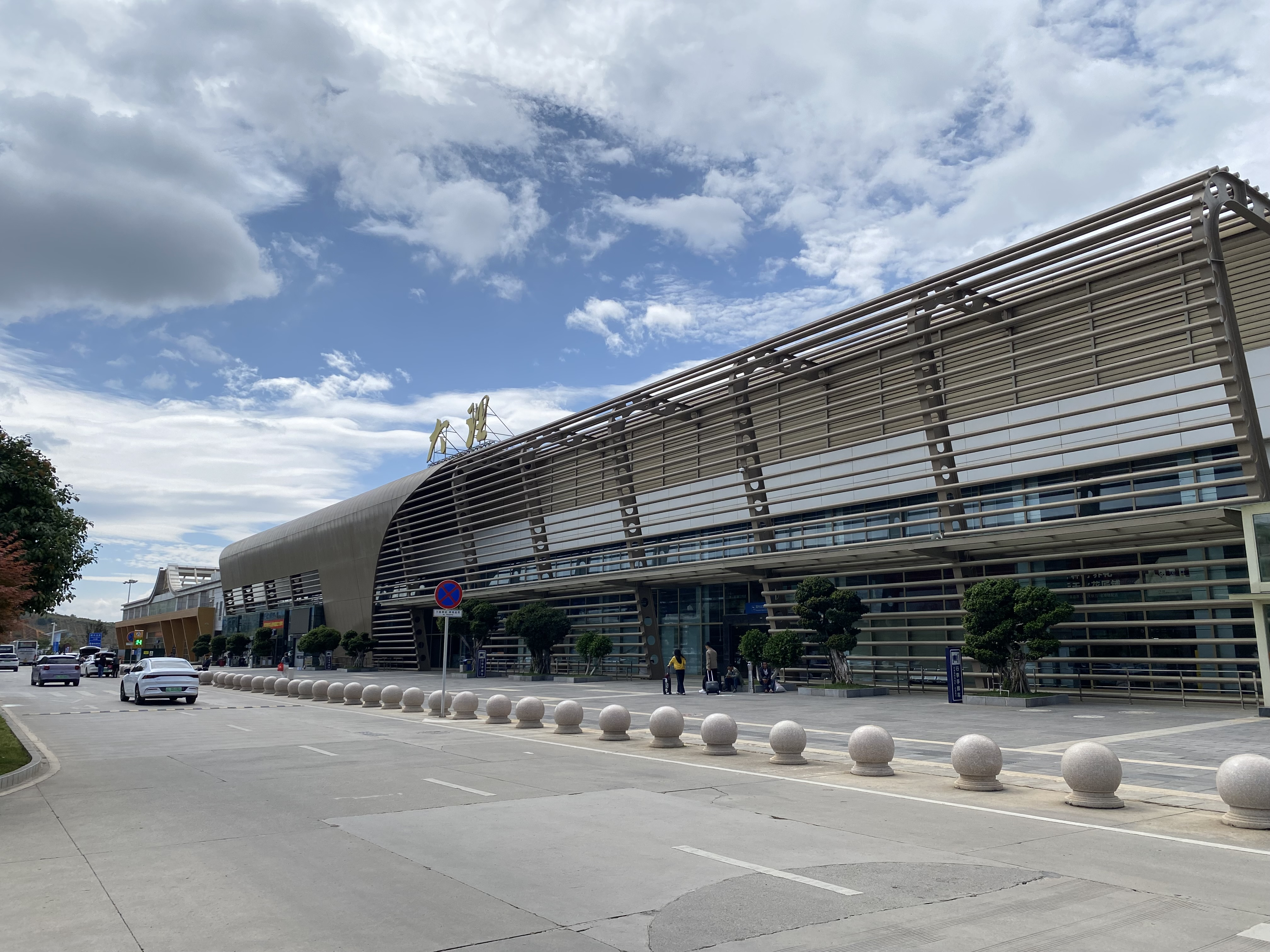
- IATA: DLU; ICAO: ZPDL

Summary
- Airport type: Public
- Operator: Yunnan Airport Group
- Serves: Dali, Yunnan
- Elevation AMSL: 7,050 ft (2,150 m)
- Coordinates: 25°39′04″N 100°19′06″E

Map
- Location in Yunnan DLU/ZPDL (China)

Runways
Direction	Length		Surface
Direction	m	ft	Surface
17/35	2,500	8,202

Statistics (2025)
- Passengers: 3,750,473
- Aircraft movements: 32,227
- Cargo (metric tons): 11,798.0

Dali Fengyi Airport
- Simplified Chinese: 大理凤仪机场
- Traditional Chinese: 大理鳳儀機場
Transcriptions
Standard Mandarin
- Hanyu Pinyin: Dàlǐ Fèngyí Jīchǎng

Dali Fengyi Airport (IATA: DLU, ICAO: ZPDL), formerly known as Dali Huangcaoba Airport (大理荒草坝机场), is a domestic branch airport and tourist airport in Dali City, Yunnan Province, China It is the hub of Lucky Air. Located in Fengyi Town, it is about 12 kilometers away from the urban area of Dali City.

Dali Airport officially opened to traffic on November 28, 1995. It is China's first high-altitude, high-fill airport. The total area is 1,683,600 square meters. The flight area is classified as 4C, which can accommodate medium and small aircraft such as Boeing 737-300 and Airbus A319. The runway is 2,600 meters long and 45 meters wide. The apron area is 56,880 square meters with 10 parking positions. The terminal building area is 14,247 square meters.

== Airlines and destinations ==
Airlines	Destinations
Air China	Beijing–Capital, Chengdu–Tianfu, Chongqing
Beijing Capital Airlines	Fuzhou, Ningbo
China Eastern Airlines	Beijing–Daxing, Changsha, Chengdu–Tianfu, Hangzhou, Kunming, Nanjing, Shanghai–Hongqiao, Shanghai–Pudong, Wuhan, Xi'an
China Southern Airlines	Changsha, Dalian, Guangzhou, Shenzhen
Chongqing Airlines	Chengdu–Tianfu, Chongqing, Guangzhou
Lucky Air	Chengdu–Tianfu, Guiyang, Hanoi, Hefei, Luzhou, Nanchang, Shijiazhuang, Tianjin, Wuhan, Xishuangbanna, Yancheng, Zhengzhou, Zunyi–Maotai, Zunyi–Xinzhou
Sichuan Airlines	Chengdu–Tianfu
Tibet Airlines	Changzhou, Chengdu–Shuangliu, Chongqing, Guangyuan, Hangzhou, Hefei, Mianyang, Nanjing, Taiyuan, Xi'an, Xuzhou, Yibin
West Air	Chongqing
Xizang Airlines	Nanjing, Yichang

== Facilities ==
The airport has a single terminal building, with additional buildings located near the terminal building. The west side of the airport features a message on a hill welcoming visitors, which is visible from the air.

== See also ==
- List of airports in the People's Republic of China
