= Chongqing Jiangbei International Airport Monorail Rapid Transit System =

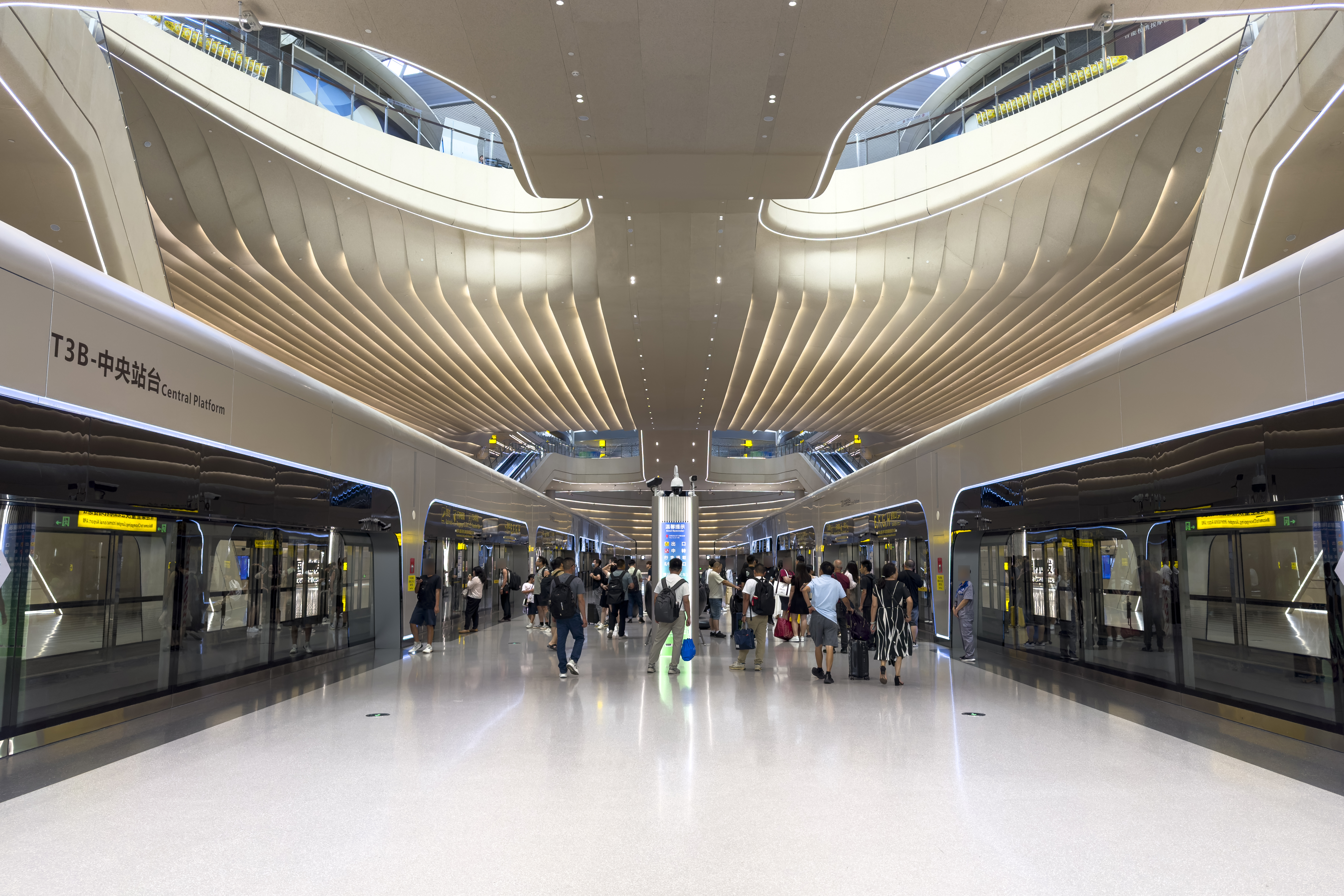
- T3B station island platform

Overview
- Native name: 重庆江北国际机场单轨捷运系统
- Status: Operational
- Owner: Chongqing Airport Group
- Locale: Chongqing Jiangbei International Airport, Chongqing, China
- Termini: T3A; T3B
- Stations: 2

Service
- Type: People mover Monorail

History
- Opened: April 9, 2025; 19 months ago

Technical
- Line length: 2.36 km (1.47 mi)
- Num of tracks: 2
- Character: Underground

Chongqing Jiangbei International Airport Monorail Rapid Transit System (Chinese: 重庆江北国际机场单轨捷运系统) is an automated people mover system operating in Chongqing Jiangbei International Airport in Chongqing, China. It connects the main portion of Terminal 3 (T3A) to its satellite concourse, T3B.

== Description ==
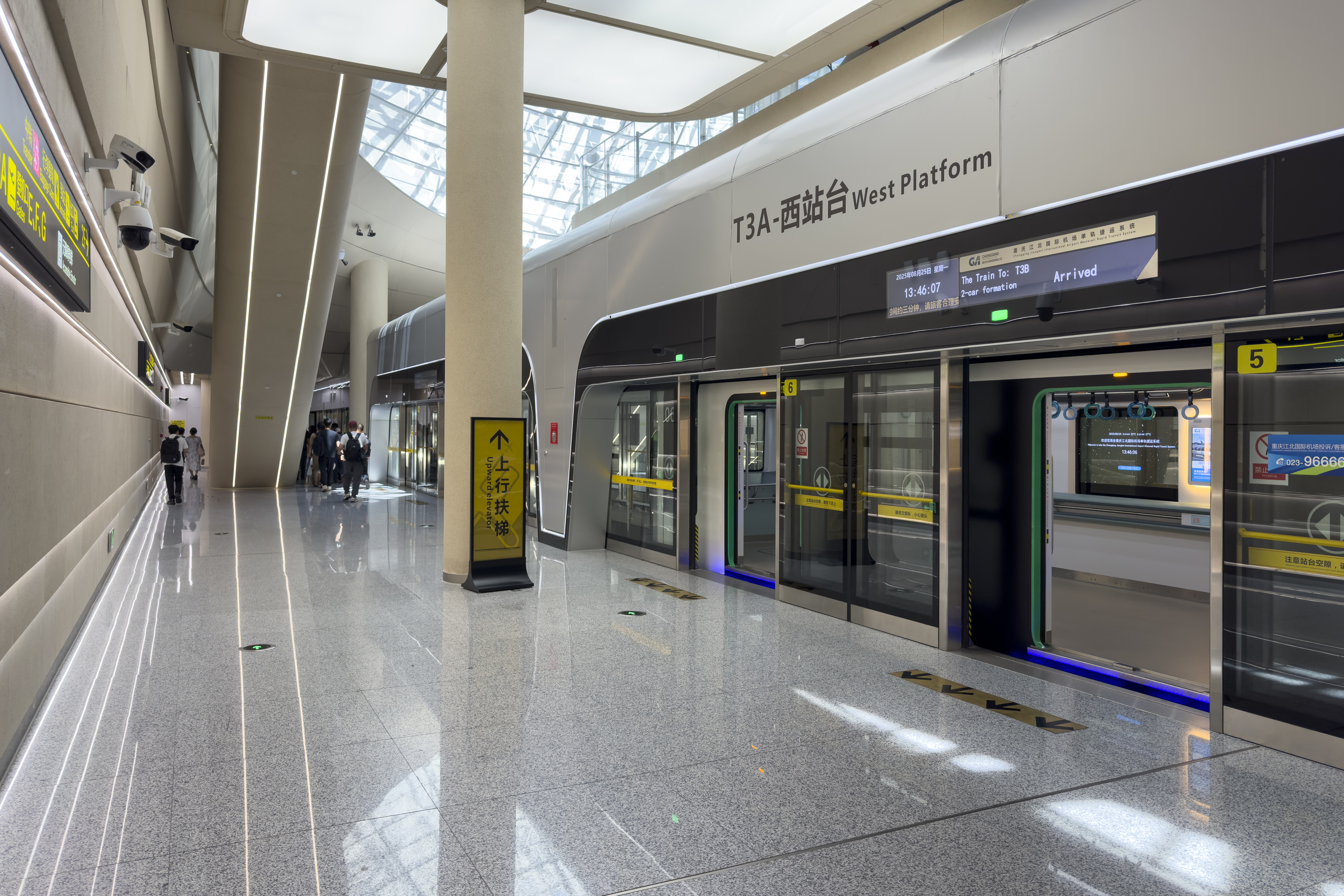
T3A station west platform. Passengers alight from the side platforms at this station for the arrivals area

The system was built as part of Jiangbei Airport's Terminal 3B satellite concourse project. The 2.36 km (1.47 mi) line is located within secure areas of the airport, and it takes 3 minutes to run between the main terminal and the satellite concourse, its two stations. Passengers departing from the J, K, L, and M gates complete their check-in and security at the main terminal, then board trains at the island platform to arrive at the satellite concourse. Similarly, passengers arriving from the satellite terminal board trains from the island platform and alight at the side platforms at the main terminal for baggage claim and ground transportation access.

It is the first straddle beam monorail airport people mover system in the world.

== Rolling stock and operations ==
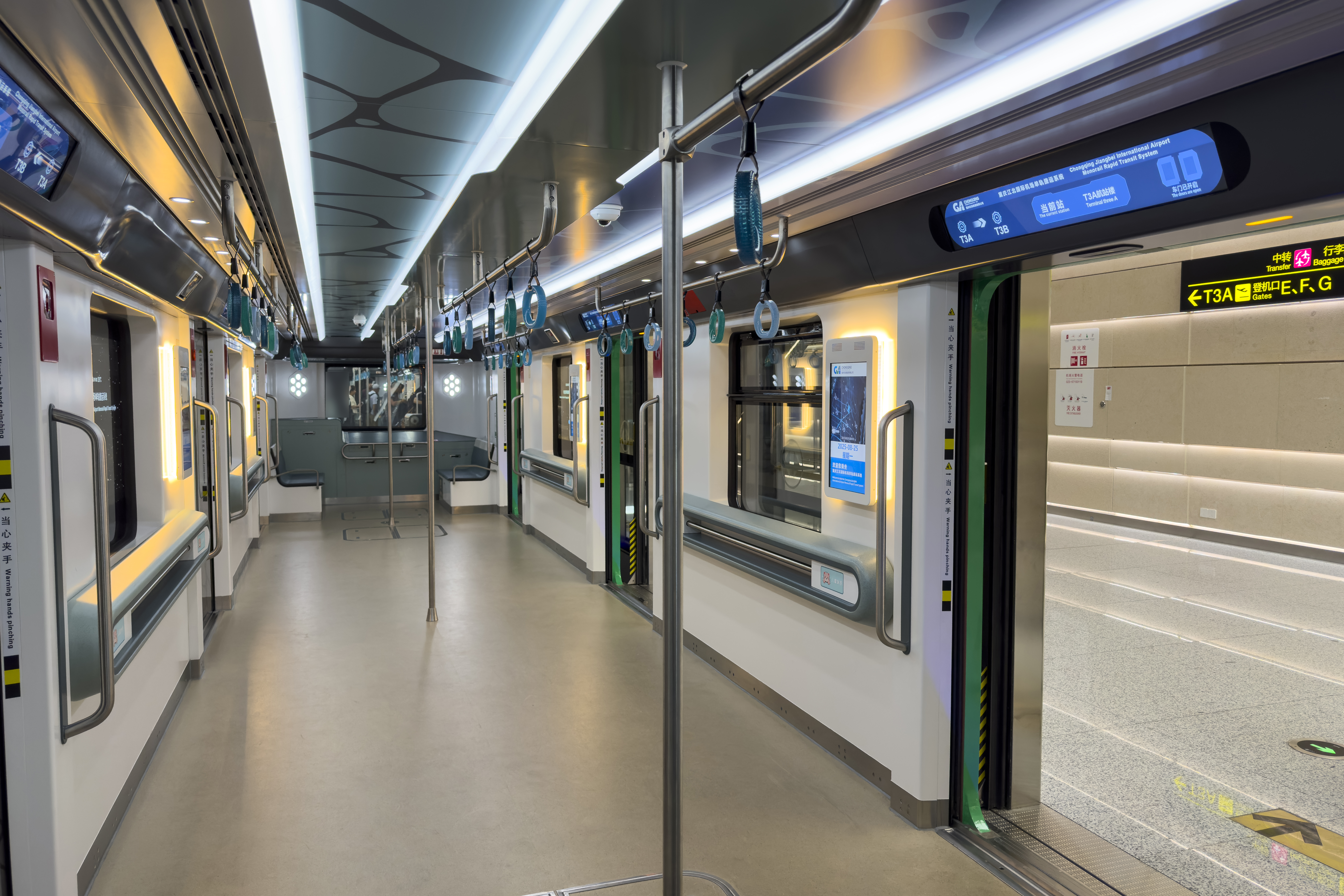
Train interior

The line uses trains manufactured locally in Chongqing by CRRC Changchun Railway Vehicles. The trains operate under GoA4 full automation, and are capable of autonomously coupling and decoupling to form 1–4 car variable consists depending on passenger demand.

The trains are propelled by synchronous motors, and are powered by onboard supercapacitors which are charged at the stations. The tracks thus use a simplified design without the usual third rail used on monorail tracks.

On the interior, each vehicle has 9 fixed seats and 2 jump seats. There are 3 doors on each side of the vehicle, and each doorway is equipped with a passenger information display.
