= Lijiang Sanyi International Airport =

Lijiang Sanyi International Airport 丽江三义国际机场
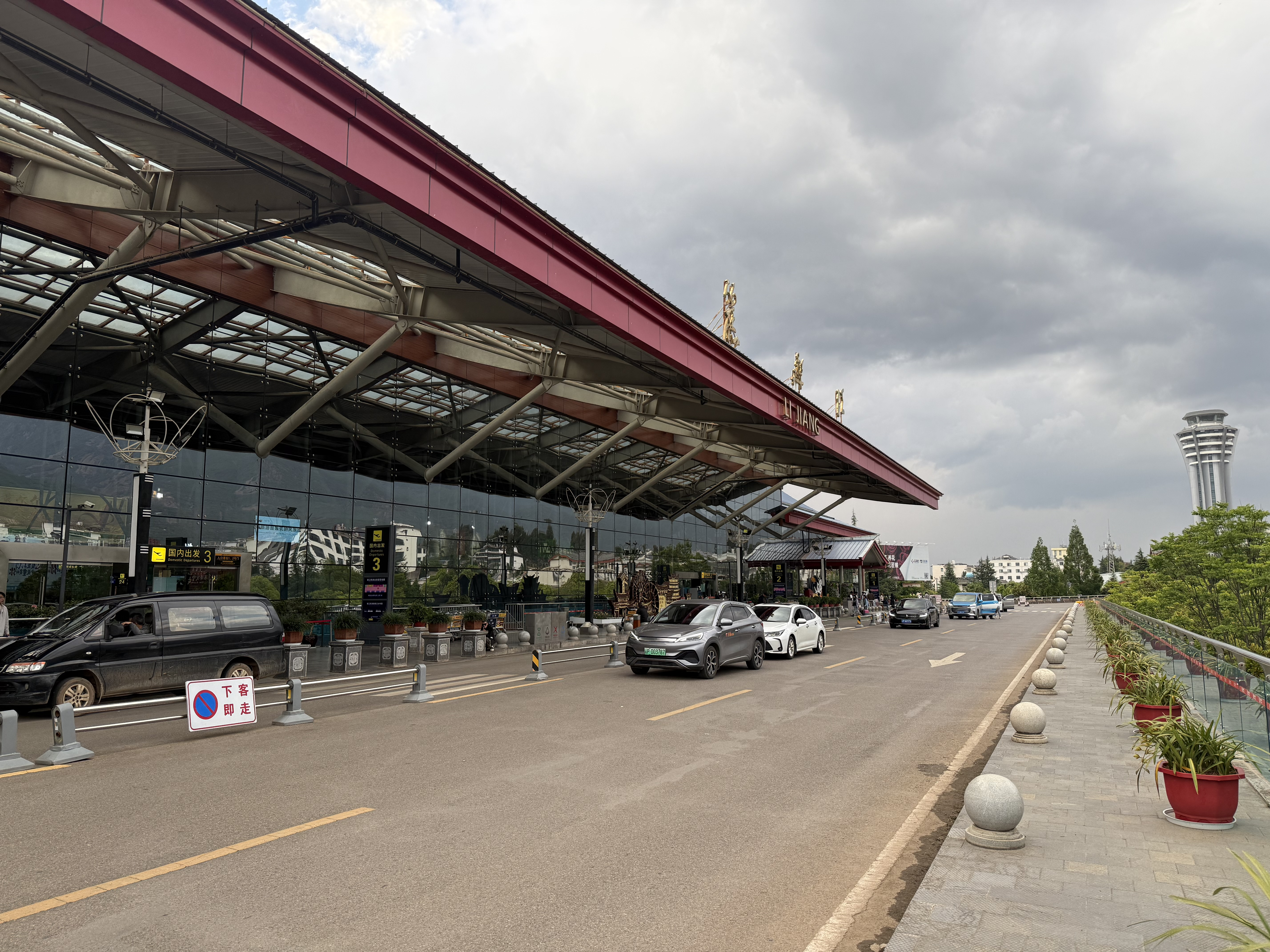
- IATA: LJG; ICAO: ZPLJ

Summary
- Airport type: Public
- Operator: Yunnan Airport Group
- Serves: Lijiang, Yunnan
- Opened: 28 June 2012; 14 years ago
- Elevation AMSL: 2,243 m (7,359 ft)
- Coordinates: 26°40′45″N 100°14′45″E
- Website: lijiang-airport.com

Map
- Location in Yunnan LJG/ZPLJ (China)

Runways
Direction	Length		Surface
Direction	m	ft	Surface
02/20	3,000	9,843	Asphalt

Statistics (2025)
- Passengers: 8,631,218
- Cargo (in tons): 16,744.9
- Aircraft movements: 62,484
- Source: List of the busiest airports in the People's Republic of China; Sources

Lijiang Sanyi International Airport
- Simplified Chinese: 丽江三义国际机场
- Traditional Chinese: 麗江三義國際機場
Transcriptions
Standard Mandarin
- Hanyu Pinyin: Lìjiāng Sānyì Guójì Jīchǎng

Lijiang Sanyi International Airport (IATA: LJG, ICAO: ZPLJ) is an airport serving Lijiang, Yunnan province, China.

Built in 1995, the civil airport is 25 km (16 mi) to the south of the city proper.

The passenger movements of Lijiang Sanyi International Airport were 4,220,618 in 2021, 2,87,8817 in 2022, 7,440,858 in 2023, 8,092,935 in 2024 and 8,631,218 in 2025 respectively.

== History ==
In 1992, Lijiang airport began construction. In April 1995, it was completed, in July 1995, the airport officially opened to the air, with the airport flight area level 4C, and a runway length of 2,500 meters and width of 45m.

Driven by the Kunming World Horticultural Exposition in 1999, the passenger throughput of Lijiang Airport exceeded 500,000 for the first time, marking the beginning of a period of rapid development for the airport. Subsequently, the first renovation and expansion project was launched, which propelled Lijiang tourism to a new peak.

In 2007, the airport carried out a second renovation and expansion. According to the annual passenger throughput of 4.5 million passengers' standard construction, including runway extension of 500 meters, the new runway parallel taxiway, 13 additional parking spaces, the new 33,300 square meters of domestic terminal building, procurement of supporting special facilities and equipment, navigation station construction and other major projects.

On March 6, 2012, Yunnan Lijiang Airport aviation port opening to the outside world officially passed the national acceptance, for the third port airport in Yunnan Province.

== Facilities ==
The airport has one runway numbered 02/20, 3,000 metres (9,843 ft) in length with turning bases at both ends of the runway.

== Airlines and destinations ==
Airlines	Destinations
Air China	Beijing–Capital, Chengdu–Tianfu, Hangzhou
Air Travel	Changsha, Nanchang, Wuxi, Yibin
Bamboo Airways	Hanoi
Beijing Capital Airlines	Beijing–Daxing, Changsha, Cheongju, Guangzhou, Guiyang, Hangzhou, Jieyang, Jinan, Nanchang, Nanjing, Nanning, Shanghai–Pudong, Shenyang, Shenzhen, Shijiazhuang, Shiyan, Taiyuan, Tianjin, Wuhan, Xiamen, Xi'an, Yancheng, Yantai, Zhengzhou
Chengdu Airlines	Changsha, Chengdu–Tianfu, Guiyang, Shenyang, Wenzhou
China Eastern Airlines	Beijing–Daxing, Chengdu–Tianfu, Guangzhou, Kunming, Shanghai–Hongqiao, Shanghai–Pudong
China Southern Airlines	Guangzhou, Shenzhen
Chongqing Airlines	Guangzhou
Hong Kong Airlines	Hong Kong
Juneyao Air	Nanjing, Shanghai–Pudong, Shenzhen, Wuhan
Kunming Airlines	Changsha, Xishuangbanna
Loong Air	Dazhou, Hangzhou, Hengyang, Huaihua, Luzhou, Ningbo, Wenzhou, Wuxi, Xiangyang, Zunyi–Xinzhou
Lucky Air	Chengdu–Tianfu, Chongqing, Dalian, Guiyang, Hai Phong, Huai'an, Luzhou, Nanjing, Ningbo, Wuhan, Xi'an, Xishuangbanna, Yinchuan, Zhengzhou
Qingdao Airlines	Changsha, Hefei, Qingdao, Xishuangbanna
Ruili Airlines	Bangkok–Suvarnabhumi, Changzhou, Ho Chi Minh City, Lanzhou, Mangshi, Tianjin, Xishuangbanna, Zhaotong
Shandong Airlines	Chengdu–Tianfu, Jinan
Shenzhen Airlines	Chengdu–Tianfu, Nanjing, Shenzhen
Sichuan Airlines	Chongqing
Spring Airlines	Shanghai–Pudong
West Air	Chongqing, Zhengzhou, Zunyi–Maotai
XiamenAir	Xiamen
Xizang Airlines	Chengdu–Shuangliu, Lhasa, Mianyang, Shenzhen, Taiyuan, Xi'an, Yuncheng

== See also ==
- List of airports in the People's Republic of China
