= Yancheng Nanyang International Airport =

Airport serving Yancheng, Jiangsu, China

Yancheng Nanyang International Airport 盐城南洋国际机场
- IATA: YNZ; ICAO: ZSYN

Summary
- Airport type: Public
- Serves: Yancheng
- Location: Nanyang, Tinghu, Yancheng, Jiangsu, China
- Opened: 29 March 2000; 26 years ago
- Elevation AMSL: 3 m (9.8 ft)
- Coordinates: 33°25′33″N 120°12′11″E
- Website: www.yccas.com

Map
- Location in Jiangsu YNZ/ZSYN (China)

Runways
Direction	Length		Surface
Direction	m	ft	Surface
04/22	2,800	9,186	Concrete

Statistics (2025)
- Passengers: 2,034,871
- Aircraft movements: 17,711
- Cargo (metric tons): 7,731.5

Yancheng Nanyang International Airport
- Simplified Chinese: 盐城南洋国际机场
- Traditional Chinese: 鹽城南洋國際機場
Transcriptions
Standard Mandarin
- Hanyu Pinyin: Yánchéng Nányáng Guójì Jīchǎng

Yancheng Nanyang International Airport (IATA: YNZ, ICAO: ZSYN) is an airport serving the city of Yancheng in East China's Jiangsu province. It is located in the town of Nanyang (南洋), 8.3 km (5.2 mi) from the city center. Commercial domestic flights started in 2000, and international flights started in 2008.

== History ==
Yancheng Nanyang International Airport is located in Nanyang Town, Tinghu District, Yancheng City, Jiangsu Province, 8.3 kilometers from the city center. In 1958, the airport was first built, initially as a Class II permanent airport of the Chinese People's Liberation Army Air Force. In August of the same year, the airport officially started construction. The airport runway was 2,200 meters long and 50 meters wide, the airport taxiway was 1,700 meters long and 14 meters wide, the airport connecting taxiway was 150 meters long and 14 meters wide, and the airport had 3 aprons with a total area of 18,900 square meters. In December of the same year, the Jiangsu Provincial Administration of Civil Aviation of China established the Yancheng Civil Aviation Station at the Yancheng Military Airport.

In 1984, it was approved by the State Council and the Central Military Commission to be a joint military-civilian airport.

In 1988, the Yancheng Municipal Government invested in the construction of a 1,664-square-meter terminal building, a 4,000-square-meter apron, a 2,000-square-meter parking lot, and a 300-square-meter dormitory for the Armed Police. On February 5 of the same year, the Yancheng Municipal Government cooperated with China United Airlines of the Air Force to establish China United Airlines Yancheng Branch. The airport officially began civilian flights on March 29, 2000.

In 2012, the Yancheng Municipal Party Committee and Government decided to renovate and expand the airport, extending the existing runway by 600 meters, from 2200 meters to 2800 meters, adding eight new parking stands to meet Class C aircraft requirements, constructing three more boarding bridges and expanding the apron area by 31,250 square meters, with a total investment of 66 million yuan. This runway expansion involved the relocation of 114 households, with a total demolition area of 29,700 square meters. In June 2015, under the full-process supervision of the East China Regional Office of the Civil Aviation Engineering Quality Supervision Station, the Yancheng Nanyang Airport Expansion and Renovation Project Acceptance Committee organized four inspection teams to conduct a thorough, systematic on‑site inspection. The project successfully passed its completion acceptance, finishing four months ahead of schedule. On October 19, 2017, the airport was officially renamed Yancheng Nanyang International Airport, and on May 31, 2018, Terminal 2 officially began operation.

In September 2018, the Provincial Party Committee and Provincial Government integrated the province's civil aviation resources, and Yancheng Nanyang International Airport joined the Eastern Airport Group as a member airport. Yancheng Airport currently has a 13,000 square meters Terminal 1 and a 30,200 square meters Terminal 2, with a 4C flight zone rating, a 2,800-meter runway, a 150,000 square meters apron, and 20 parking stands. It can handle the full-load takeoff and landing of medium-sized aircraft such as Boeing 737 and Airbus A320, meeting the demand of 3 million passengers and 30,000 takeoffs and landings per year by 2025, with a typical peak hour of 15 takeoffs and landings.

On October 11, 2021, the renovation project of Terminal 1 at Yancheng Nanyang International Airport commenced. The T1 terminal renovation project is designed to meet the target of 340,000 international passengers and 272 passengers per peak hour by 2030. After the renovation, the total building area will be approximately 13,850 square meters, and the terminal will be converted into a pure international passenger terminal. It will work in synergy with the T2 terminal to meet the needs of the rapidly growing passenger throughput. On April 21, 2023, the renovation project of Terminal 1 at Yancheng Nanyang International Airport passed the final acceptance inspection; on July 12, Terminal 1 at Yancheng Nanyang International Airport was reopened and its nature was changed to an international terminal, while Terminal 2 was changed to a domestic terminal.

In 2025, the airport's actual passenger throughput was 2,034,871, and the number of aircraft takeoffs and landings was 17,711, both far below the planned targets of 3 million passenger throughput and 30,000 aircraft takeoffs and landings.

== Facilities ==
The airport has one runway which is 2,800 metres (9,186 ft) long.

== Airlines and destinations ==
=== Passenger ===
Airlines	Destinations
Air China	Beijing–Capital, Beijing–Daxing
Air Guilin	Guilin, Zhuhai
Asiana Airlines	Seoul–Incheon
Beijing Capital Airlines	Guiyang, Lijiang, Quanzhou, Sanya
Chengdu Airlines	Changchun, Chengdu–Tianfu, Haikou, Shenyang
China Eastern Airlines	Shenyang, Wuhan
China Express Airlines	Chongqing, Taiyuan, Zhoushan
China Southern Airlines	Guangzhou, Jieyang, Nanning, Shenzhen
Jiangxi Air	Nanchang
LJ Air	Taiyuan
Lucky Air	Chengdu–Tianfu, Dali, Dalian, Guiyang, Kunming
Sichuan Airlines	Changchun, Changsha, Chengdu–Tianfu, Yibin
Spring Airlines	Chongqing, Dalian, Fuzhou, Shenyang
Tianjin Airlines	Taizhou, Ürümqi, Xi'an
XiamenAir	Chongqing, Harbin, Xiamen

=== Cargo ===
Airlines	Destinations
China Postal Airlines	Seoul–Incheon
Tianjin Air Cargo	Osaka–Kansai, Seoul–Incheon

== See also ==
- List of airports in the People's Republic of China
