= Yangzhou Taizhou International Airport =

Airport serving Yangzhou and Taizhou, Jiangsu, China

Yangzhou Taizhou International Airport 扬州泰州国际机场
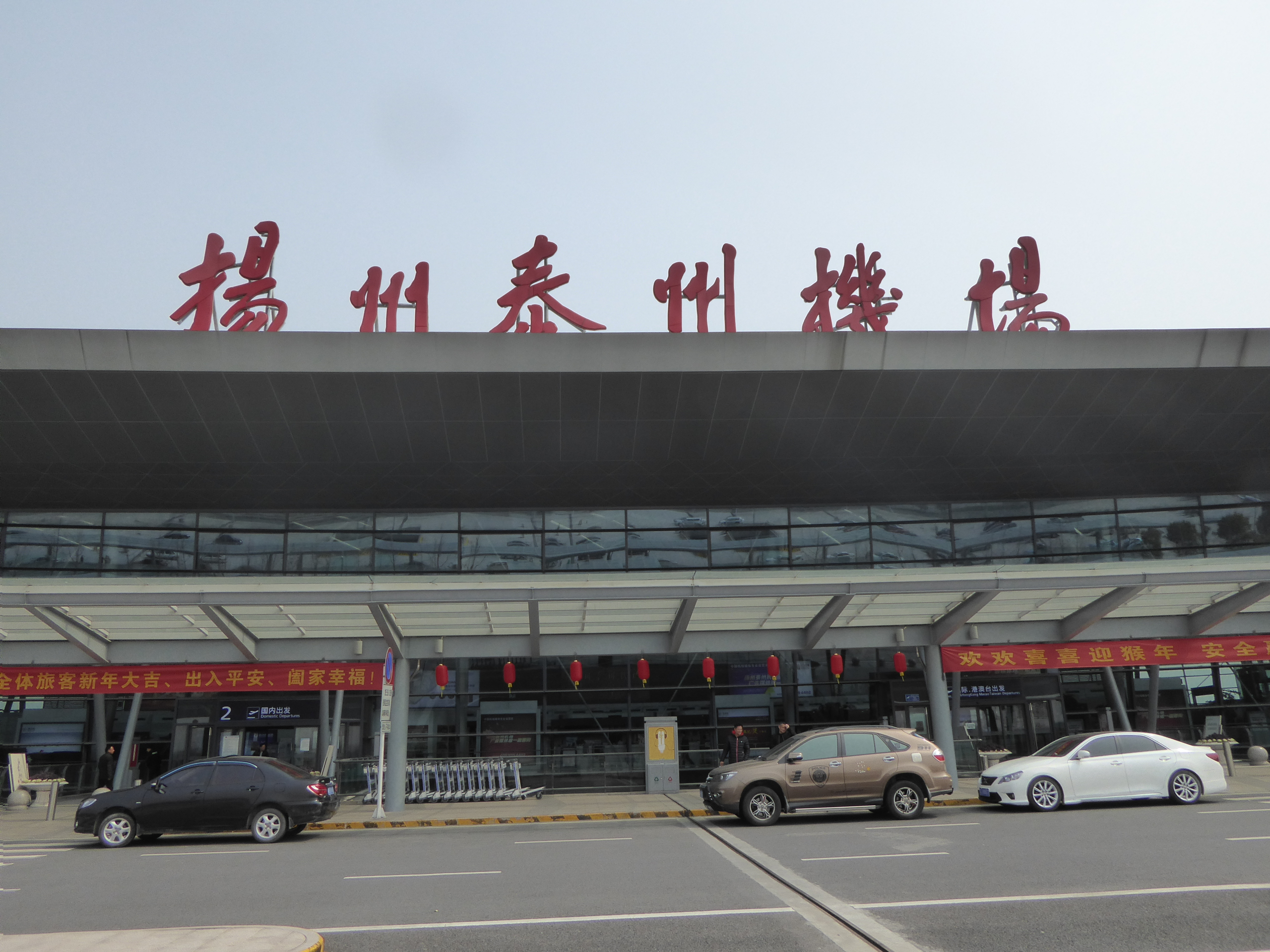
- IATA: YTY; ICAO: ZSYA

Summary
- Airport type: Public
- Owner: City of Yangzhou (80%); City of Taizhou (20%)
- Operator: Yangzhou Taizhou International Airport Investment and Construction Co., Ltd.
- Serves: Yangzhou and Taizhou
- Location: Jiangdu, Yangzhou, Jiangsu
- Opened: 7 May 2012; 14 years ago
- Elevation AMSL: 2 m (6.6 ft)
- Coordinates: 32°33′42″N 119°42′54″E
- Website: yztzairport.net

Map
- Location in Jiangsu YTY/ZSYA (China)

Runways
Direction	Length		Surface
Direction	m	ft	Surface
17/35	3,200	10,499	concrete

Statistics (2025)
- Passengers: 4,163,596
- Aircraft movements: 47,471
- Cargo (metric tons): 14,994.1
- Source: CAAC

Yangzhou Taizhou International Airport
- Simplified Chinese: 扬州泰州国际机场
- Traditional Chinese: 揚州泰州國際機場
Transcriptions
Standard Mandarin
- Hanyu Pinyin: Yángzhōu Tàizhōu Guójì Jīchǎng

Yangzhou Taizhou International Airport (IATA: YTY, ICAO: ZSYA) is an airport serving the cities of Yangzhou and Taizhou in central Jiangsu, China. It is located in Jiangdu, Yangzhou, 30 kilometers from the center of Yangzhou and 20 kilometers from Taizhou. Another major city, Zhenjiang, is also nearby across the Yangtze River.

== History ==
The airport is jointly constructed and owned by the cities of Yangzhou (80% share) and Taizhou (20% share), with a total investment of 2.082 billion yuan. The airport was opened on 7 May 2012. During the design and construction stage it was called Suzhong Jiangdu Airport (苏中江都机场), but was renamed in November 2011 to reflect the names of the main cities it serves. The name plate at the airport was a calligraphy work of former CCP leader Jiang Zemin, a native of Yangzhou.

In March 2016, with approval from the Civil Aviation Administration of China (CAAC), Yangzhou Taizhou Airport was officially renamed Yangzhou Taizhou International Airport (扬州泰州国际机场), marking its transition toward a more globally oriented role. The following year, in April 2017, the Jiangsu Provincial Development and Reform Commission approved the feasibility study for the airport's Phase I expansion project, allowing the development to move from preliminary planning into full construction.

Construction milestones came rapidly in 2018. On 20 August, the airport's original 2,400‑meter runway and its 800‑meter extension were successfully joined. By 29 September, the project had passed its completion inspection. On 2 October, the airport conducted its first calibration flight, coinciding with the start of industry acceptance procedures for the Phase I expansion. Later that month, on 30 October, all flights were temporarily suspended to allow a wide‑body Airbus A330 to complete a successful test flight—an achievement that demonstrated the airport's new capability to support medium‑ and long‑haul operations. On 11 December, the CAAC East China Regional Administration issued a new operating license, upgrading the airfield classification from 4C to 4E.

In response to a local COVID‑19 outbreak, all passenger flights at Yangzhou Taizhou International Airport were suspended beginning 31 July 2021. Operations resumed on 16 September once the situation had stabilized.

The airport's Phase II expansion began to take shape in 2022. In June, the Jiangsu Provincial Development and Reform Commission (江苏发改委) formally approved the feasibility study for the second phase. The following month, early‑start works commenced, signaling the transition into the construction stage. On 18 April 2023, the main works for the Phase II expansion—focused on the airfield area—officially broke ground, marking another significant step in the airport's long‑term development.

== Facilities ==
Designed as a domestic regional airport (class 4C), the airport's runway was originally 2,400 meters (7,900 ft) long and 45 meters (148 ft) wide. It has a 31,000-square-meter terminal building and 13 aircraft parking aprons. It was designed to handle an annual throughput of 2 million passengers and 24,000 tons of cargo by 2020.

In December 2018, the runway was extended to 3,200 meters and the airport was upgraded to class 4E. It is now capable of handling long-range, four-engine aircraft such as the Boeing 747 and the Airbus A340.

== Airlines and destinations ==
Airlines	Destinations
Air China	Beijing–Capital, Beijing–Daxing, Chengdu–Shuangliu
China Eastern Airlines	Jinzhou, Nanchang, Ordos, Weihai
China Express Airlines	Jingzhou, Zhoushan
China Southern Airlines	Dalian, Dandong, Guangzhou
Colorful Guizhou Airlines	Yibin
Kunming Airlines	Changsha, Kunming, Xishuangbanna
Okay Airways	Changchun, Shenzhen
Shandong Airlines	Guiyang, Jinan, Yantai, Zhuhai
Shenzhen Airlines	Changchun, Guangzhou, Harbin, Huizhou, Kuala Lumpur–International, Quanzhou, Shenyang, Shenzhen, Xiamen, Xi'an
Sichuan Airlines	Chengdu–Shuangliu, Chongqing
Spring Airlines	Bangkok–Suvarnabhumi, Changchun, Chongqing, Dalian, Fuzhou, Guilin, Guiyang, Harbin, Jieyang, Kunming, Lanzhou, Mianyang, Nanning, Seoul–Incheon, Shenyang, Ürümqi, Xiamen, Yinchuan, Zhangjiajie, Zhuhai
Tianjin Airlines	Guiyang, Haikou, Wenzhou, Yichang, Yulin (Shaanxi)
Urumqi Air	Lanzhou, Ürümqi

== See also ==
- List of airports in China
- List of the busiest airports in China
