= Mianyang Nanjiao Airport =

Mianyang Nanjiao Airport 绵阳南郊机场
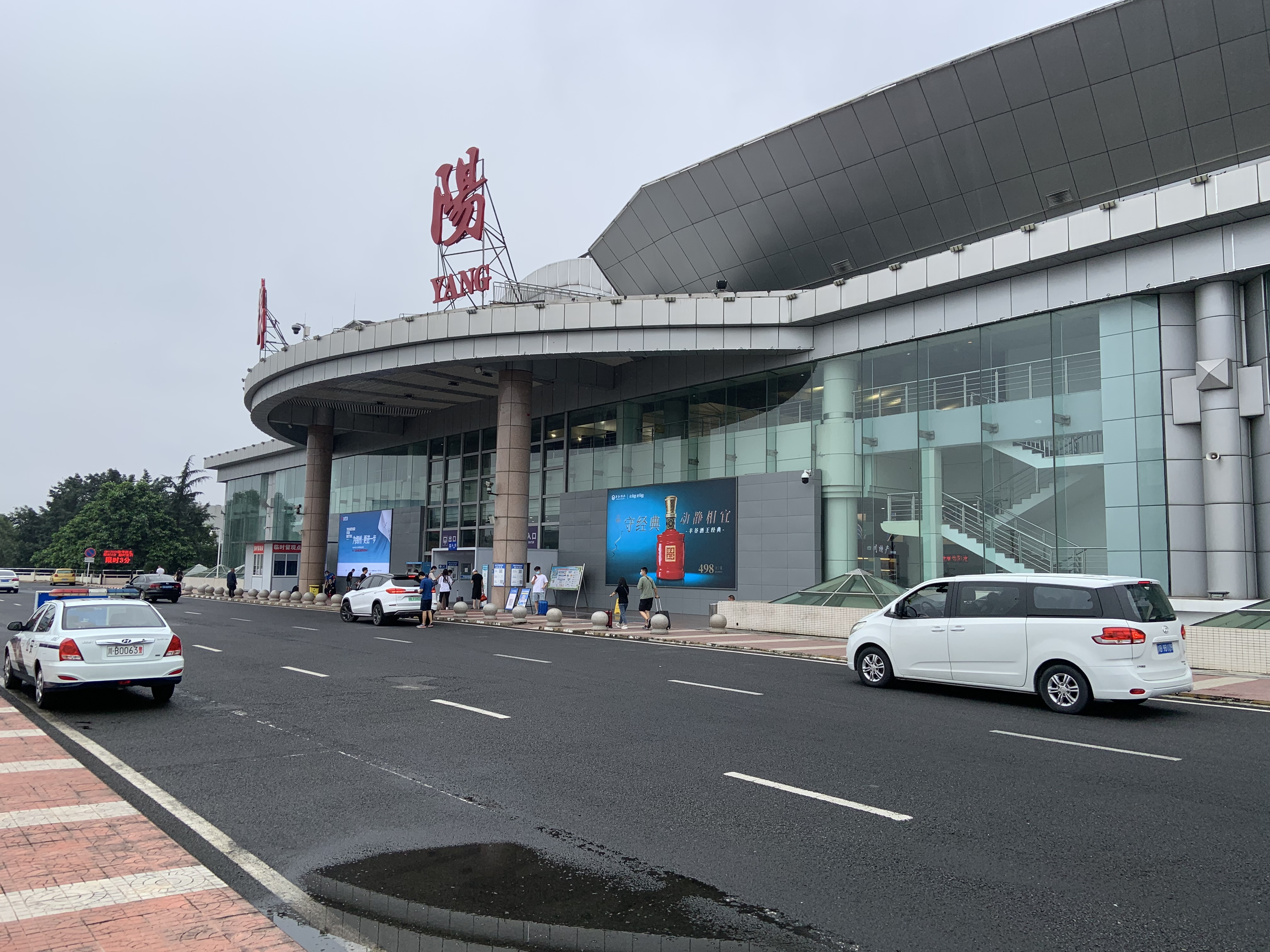
- IATA: MIG; ICAO: ZUMY

Summary
- Airport type: Public
- Serves: Mianyang, Sichuan
- Location: Fucheng District, Mianyang
- Coordinates: 31°25′48″N 104°44′23″E
- Website: www.myairport.cn

Map
- Location of airport in Sichuan

Runways
Direction	Length		Surface
Direction	m	ft	Surface
14/32	2,400	7,874	Concrete

Statistics (2025)
- Passengers: 3,286,383
- Aircraft movements: 191,020
- Cargo (in tons): 7,492.8

Mianyang Nanjiao Airport
- Simplified Chinese: 绵阳南郊机场
- Traditional Chinese: 綿陽南郊機場
Transcriptions
Standard Mandarin
- Hanyu Pinyin: Miányáng Nánjiāo Jīchǎng

Mianyang Nanjiao Airport (IATA: MIG, ICAO: ZUMY) is an airport serving the city of Mianyang in Sichuan Province, China. It is located in the southern suburbs of Mianyang (Nanjiao means "southern suburbs" in Chinese), 10 kilometers from the city center.

Opened on 28 April 2001, Mianyang Nanjiao is also used for pilot training by the Civil Aviation Flight University of China (Mianyang Flight College).

In 2011 Mianyang Nanjiao Airport served 622,816 passengers, ranking 66th among China's airports. It also handled 4,491.5 tons of cargo and 207,140 aircraft movements.

== History ==
Mianyang Nanjiao Airport was developed to replace the older Mianyang Tangxun Airport (塘汛机场), which had served as a military and training airfield for decades. In 1956, it became the base of the Fourth Regiment of the China Civil Aviation Advanced Aviation School, the predecessor of today's Civil Aviation Flight University of China (CAFUC; 中国民用航空飞行学院).

The new airport first proposed its construction concept in 1988. A preparatory leadership group was established in 1992, and a pre‑feasibility study was approved in 1993. On July 3, 1994, the State Council and the Central Military Commission approved the relocation of Tangxun Airport and the construction of a new civil airport for Mianyang. The new facility was officially named Mianyang Nanjiao Airport and designated as a 4C‑class airport shared between the city and the Mianyang Branch of CAFUC. Construction approval for the project was issued the same year. The feasibility report was issued in 1995, the master plan was implemented in 1996. The groundbreaking ceremony was held on July 3, 1997 and full construction began in October of that year. The airport was completed and officially opened to traffic on April 28, 2001.

Shortly after opening, the airport expanded rapidly. It was upgraded to 4D classification in 2003 and further to 4E in 2008. During the 2008 Wenchuan earthquake, the airport served as a major hub for emergency relief operations, handling large volumes of rescue personnel, medical evacuations, and supply flights.

In 2017, the airport's annual passenger throughput exceeded 3 million, reflecting its status as one of the fastest‑growing regional airports in western China.

In 2019, with Chengdu Shuangliu Airport reaching capacity saturation, Mianyang Airport's passenger and cargo throughput reached record highs since its opening (4.15 million passengers and 8,860.4 tons). A total of 56 passenger routes and 1 cargo route were opened, connecting 37 cities.

== Facilities ==
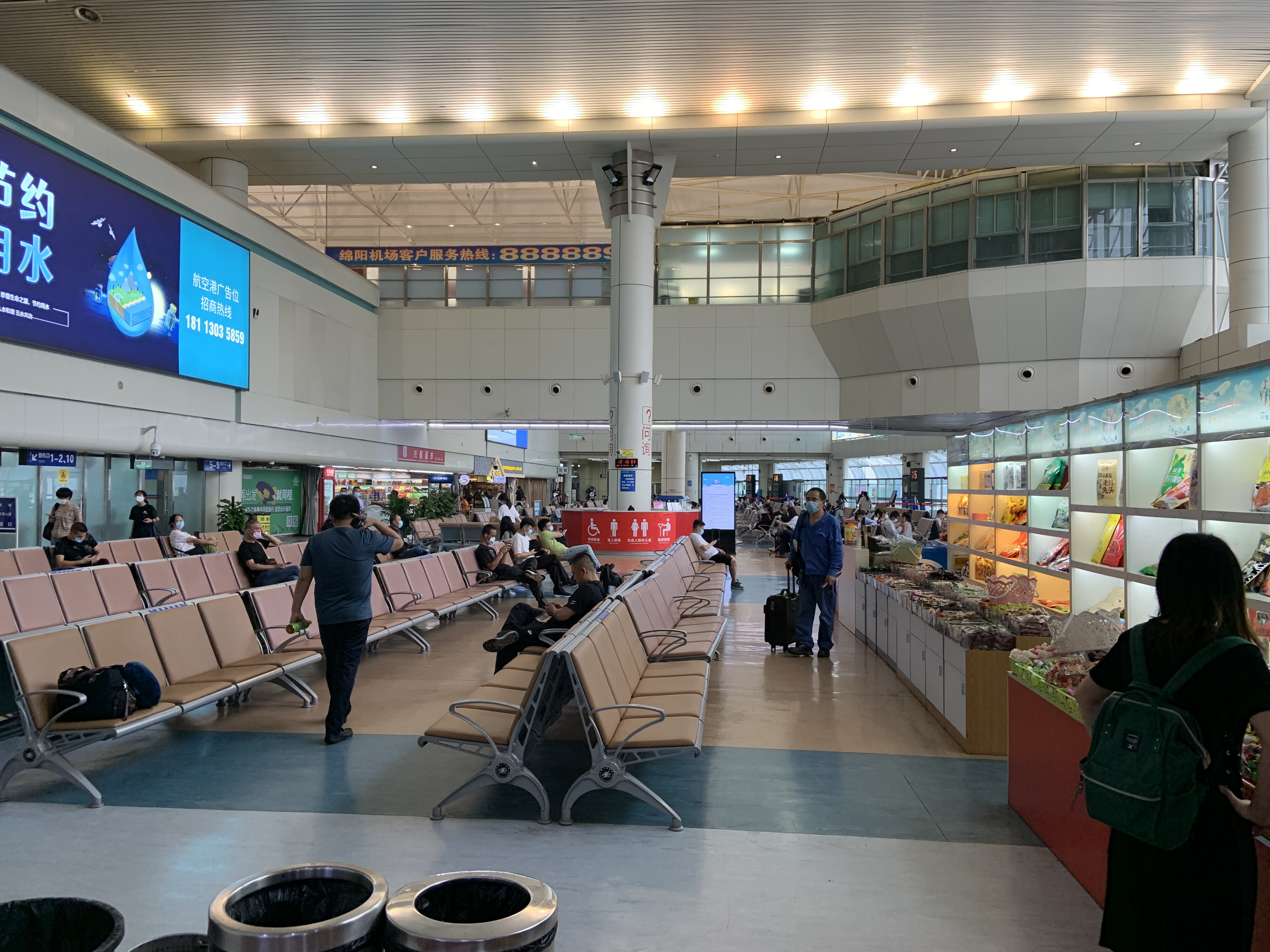
Terminal 1 interior

Mianyang Nanjiao Airport has a 2,400-meter runway (class 4D) capable of handling major aircraft including the Boeing 737. It also has a 26,000-square-meter terminal building and 11 aircraft parking aprons. The airport is designed with an annual handling capacity of 2 million passengers.

== Airlines and destinations ==
Mianyang Nanjiao Airport is served by the following airlines:

Airlines	Destinations
Air China	Beijing–Capital, Beijing–Daxing
Chengdu Airlines	Changzhou, Shenyang
China Eastern Airlines	Nanjing
China Express Airlines	Chongqing, Xichang
China Southern Airlines	Guangzhou, Shenzhen
Hebei Airlines	Hangzhou, Shijiazhuang
Lucky Air	Kunming, Lhasa, Tianjin
Shanghai Airlines	Shanghai–Pudong
Shenzhen Airlines	Hefei, Shenzhen
Sichuan Airlines	Beijing–Capital, Hangzhou, Lanzhou, Lhasa, Sanya, Urumqi, Xishuangbanna
Spring Airlines	Ningbo, Shanghai–Pudong, Shijiazhuang, Yangzhou
Suparna Airlines	Haikou, Jinan
Urumqi Air	Haikou, Urumqi
XiamenAir	Changsha, Fuzhou, Quanzhou, Wuhan, Xiamen
Xizang Airlines	Changzhou, Dali, Lhasa, Lijiang, Nanjing, Nanning, Nyingchi, Qamdo, Shenzhen, Wenzhou, Wuhan, Xishuangbanna

== See also ==
- List of airports in China
- List of the busiest airports in China
