= Chongqing Airlines =

Chinese airline

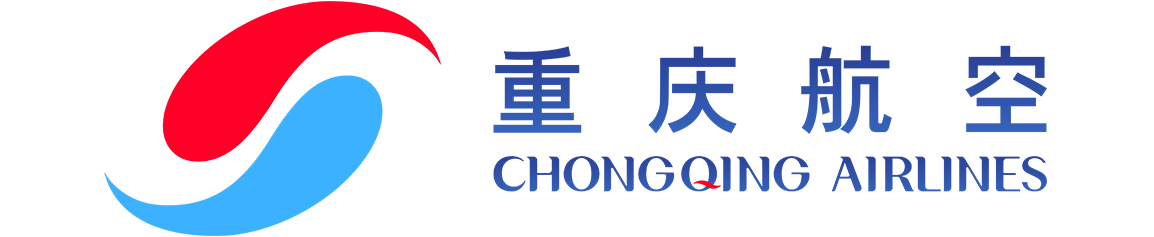

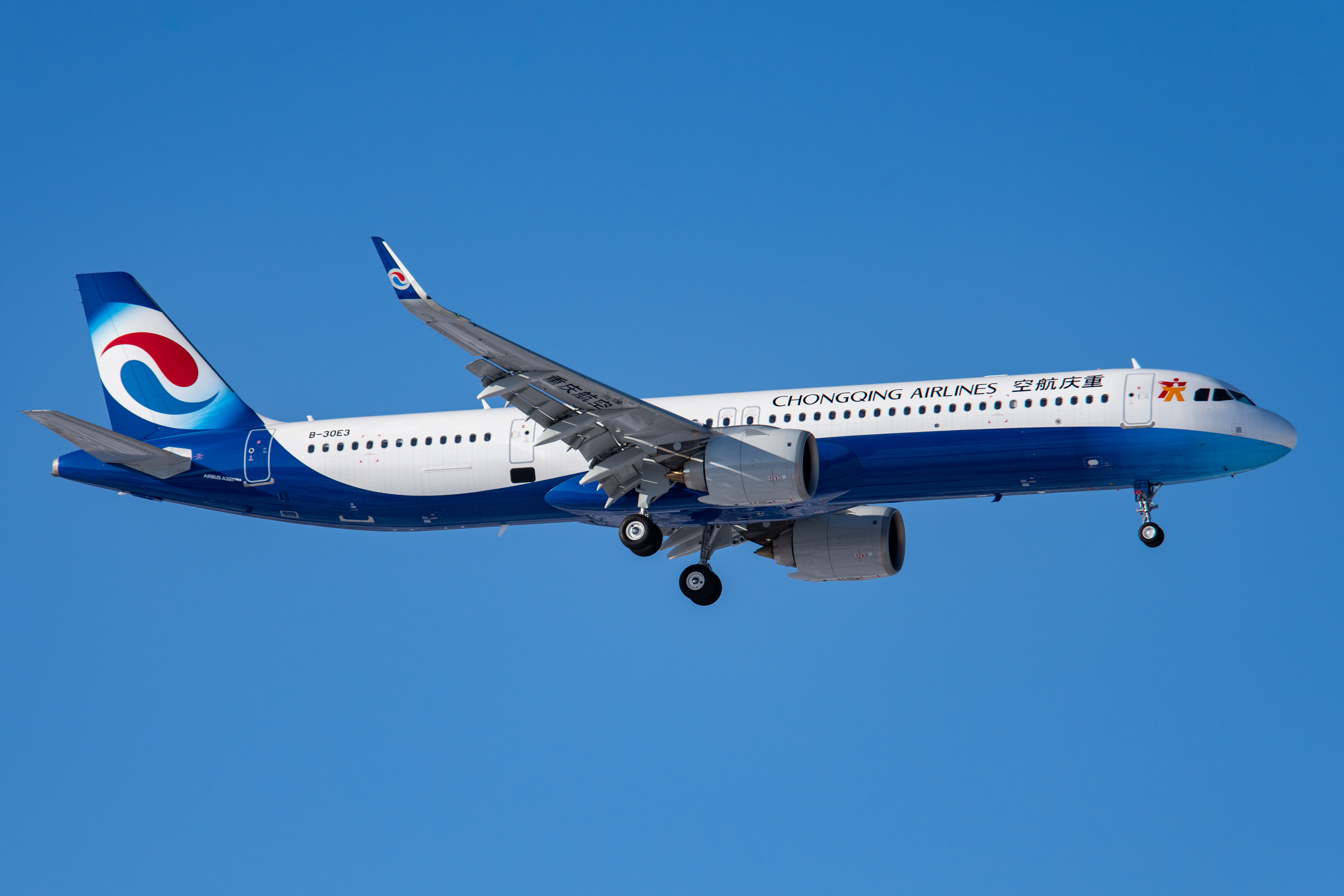
- Chongqing Airlines A321neo
IATA	ICAO	Call sign
OQ	CQN	CHONG QING
- Founded: 16 June 2007; 19 years ago
- Hubs: Chongqing
- Fleet size: 30
- Destinations: 32
- Parent company: China Southern Airlines (60%)
- Headquarters: Chongqing, China
- Key people: Liu Dejun (CEO)
- Website: www.chongqingairlines.cn

Chongqing Airlines (Chinese: 重庆航空) is an airline based in Chongqing, China. It operates both domestic passenger services within mainland China and international passenger services to Sri Lanka, Maldives, Thailand, Vietnam and Singapore out of Chongqing Jiangbei International Airport.

Chongqing Airlines had 402 employees in 2008.

== History ==
Chongqing Airlines is jointly owned by China Southern Airlines (60%) and Chongqing Municipal Development & Investment Company (40%). The airline was established on 16 June 2007, and received its operating licence from the Civil Aviation Administration of China on 4 July 2007.

As of July 2013, it had 11 aircraft from the Airbus A320 family: 7 A320s and 4 A319s. The airline is also transitioning to a low-cost carrier model, which has shown promising results in terms of profitability. The airline is currently transitioning to a low-cost carrier model to better serve the growing demand in China's western regions.

Chongqing Airlines launched its first flight from Chongqing to Shanghai Pudong International Airport on 8 July 2007.

== Destinations ==
Chongqing Airlines served the following destinations in December 2024:

Country	City	Airport	Notes	Refs
China	Chongqing	Chongqing Jiangbei International Airport	Hub	
China	Dali	Dali Airport		
China	Fuzhou	Fuzhou Changle International Airport		
China	Guangzhou	Guangzhou Baiyun International Airport		
China	Guilin	Guilin Liangjiang International Airport		
China	Hangzhou	Hangzhou Xiaoshan International Airport		
China	Harbin	Harbin Taiping International Airport		
China	Hefei	Hefei Xinqiao International Airport		
China	Huizhou	Huizhou Pingtan Airport		
China	Jinan	Jinan Yaoqiang International Airport		
China	Jiuzhaigou	Jiuzhai Huanglong Airport		
China	Kunming	Kunming Changshui International Airport		
China	Kunming	Kunming Wujiaba International Airport	Airport closed	
China	Lijiang	Lijiang Sanyi International Airport		
China	Lhasa	Lhasa Gonggar Airport		
China	Mangshi	Dehong Mangshi Airport		
China	Nanchang	Nanchang Changbei International Airport		
China	Nanjing	Nanjing Lukou International Airport		
China	Qianjiang District	Qianjiang Wulingshan Airport		
China	Sanya	Sanya Phoenix International Airport		
China	Shanghai	Shanghai Pudong International Airport		
China	Shangri-La County	Dêqên Shangri-La Airport		
China	Shenzhen	Shenzhen Bao'an International Airport		
China	Tengchong	Tengchong Tuofeng Airport		
China	Wenzhou	Wenzhou Yongqiang International Airport		
China	Wuhan	Wuhan Tianhe International Airport		
China	Xiamen	Xiamen Gaoqi International Airport		
China	Xishuangbanna	Xishuangbanna Gasa Airport		
Malaysia	Penang	Penang International Airport	Starting April 2026	
Maldives	Malé	Velana International Airport		
Singapore	Singapore	Changi Airport		
Sri Lanka	Colombo	Bandaranaike International Airport		
Thailand	Phuket	Phuket International Airport		
Vietnam	Hanoi	Noi Bai International Airport		
Vietnam	Ho Chi Minh City	Tan Son Nhat International Airport		

== Fleet ==
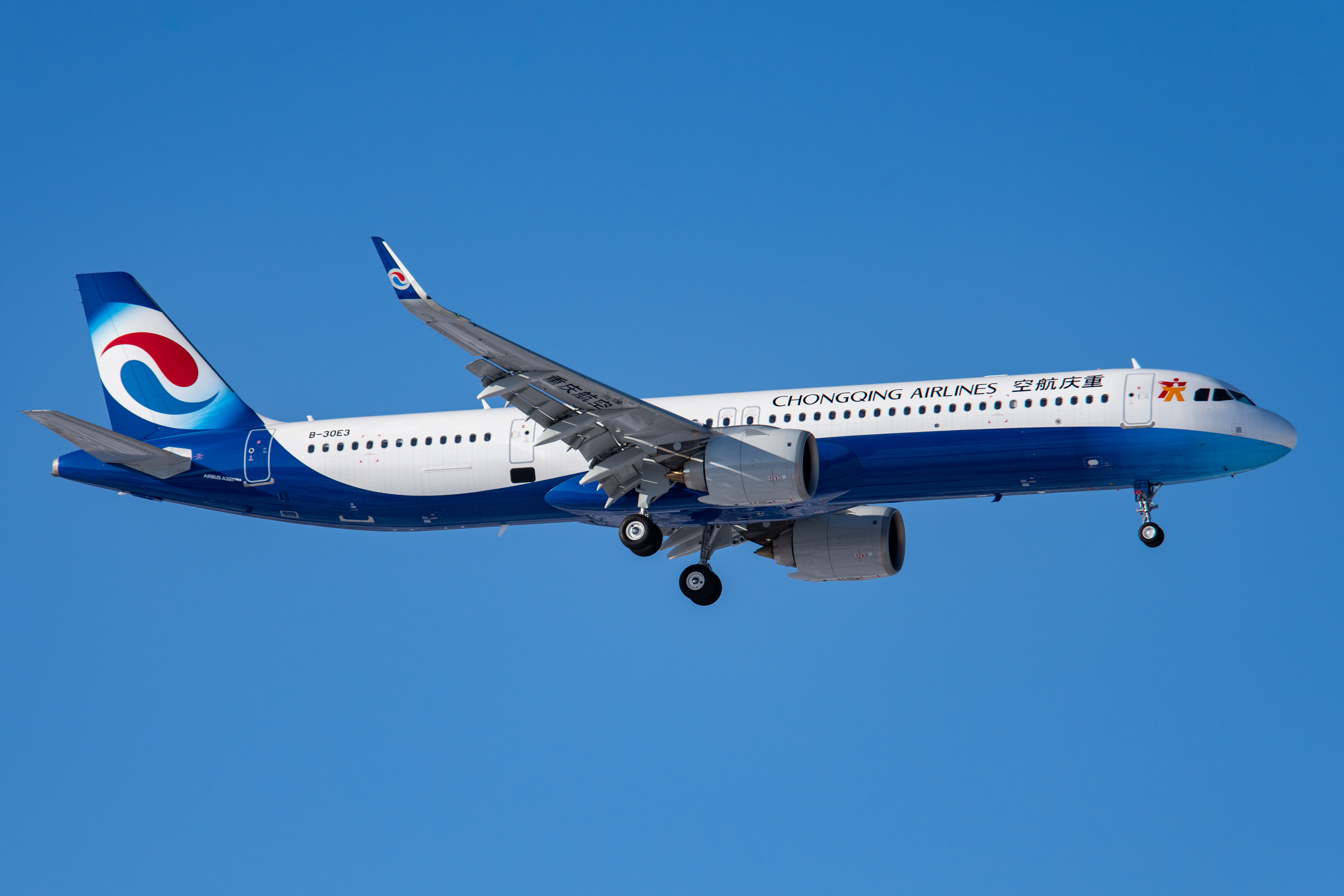
Chongqing Airlines Airbus A321neo with Airbus Cabin Flex configuration in 2020

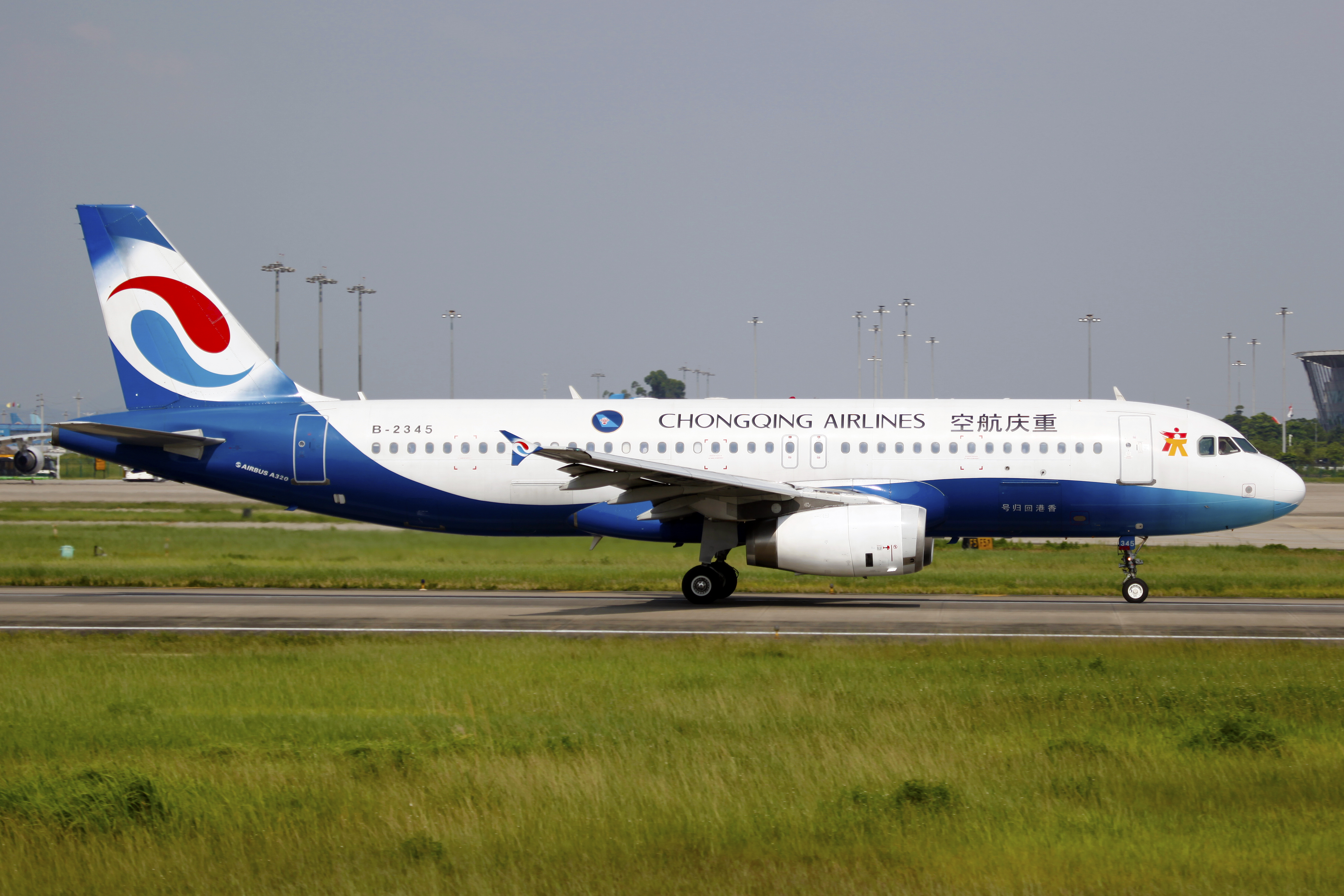
Chongqing Airlines Airbus A320 in standard livery in 2014

As of September 2025, Chongqing Airlines operates an all-Airbus A320 family fleet composed of the following aircraft:

Chongqing Airlines fleet
Aircraft	Total	Orders	Passengers				Notes
Aircraft	Total	Orders	J	W	Y	Total	Notes
Airbus A319-100	6	—	8	—	120	128	
Airbus A320-200	13	—	8	24	120	152	Transferred from China Southern Airlines.
Airbus A320neo	9	—	4	24	138	166	
Airbus A321neo	3	—	8	24	176	208	
Total	31	—					

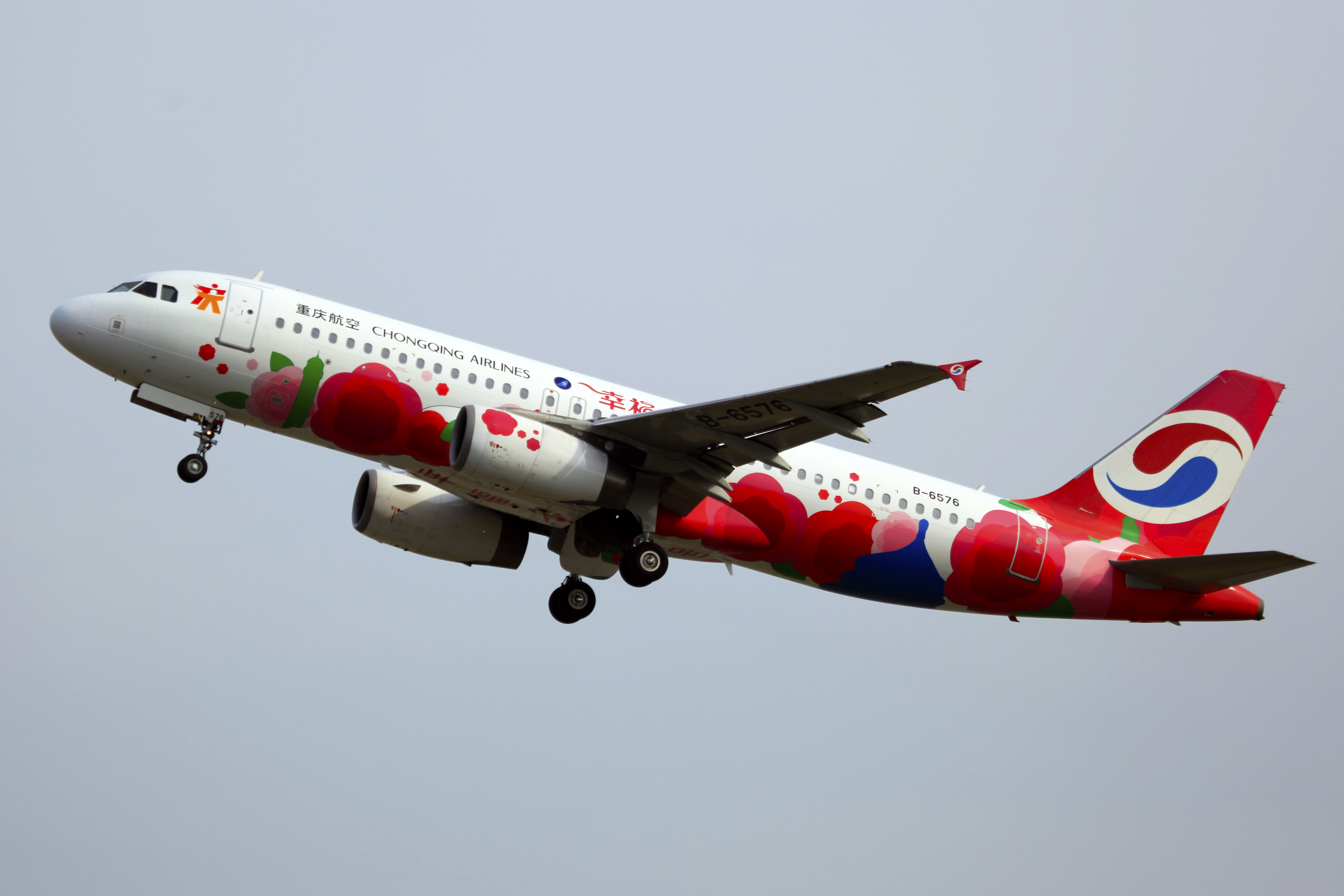
Chongqing Airlines Airbus A320 in "Happy Chongqing" special livery
