= Hohhot Airport =

Hohhot Airport may refer to:

- Hohhot Baita International Airport, China, which will be replaced by Shengle Airport
- Hohhot Shengle International Airport, China, opening in November 2026
