= Beijing Nanyuan Airport =

Former airport of Beijing, China (1910–2019)

Beijing Nanyuan Airport 北京南苑机场
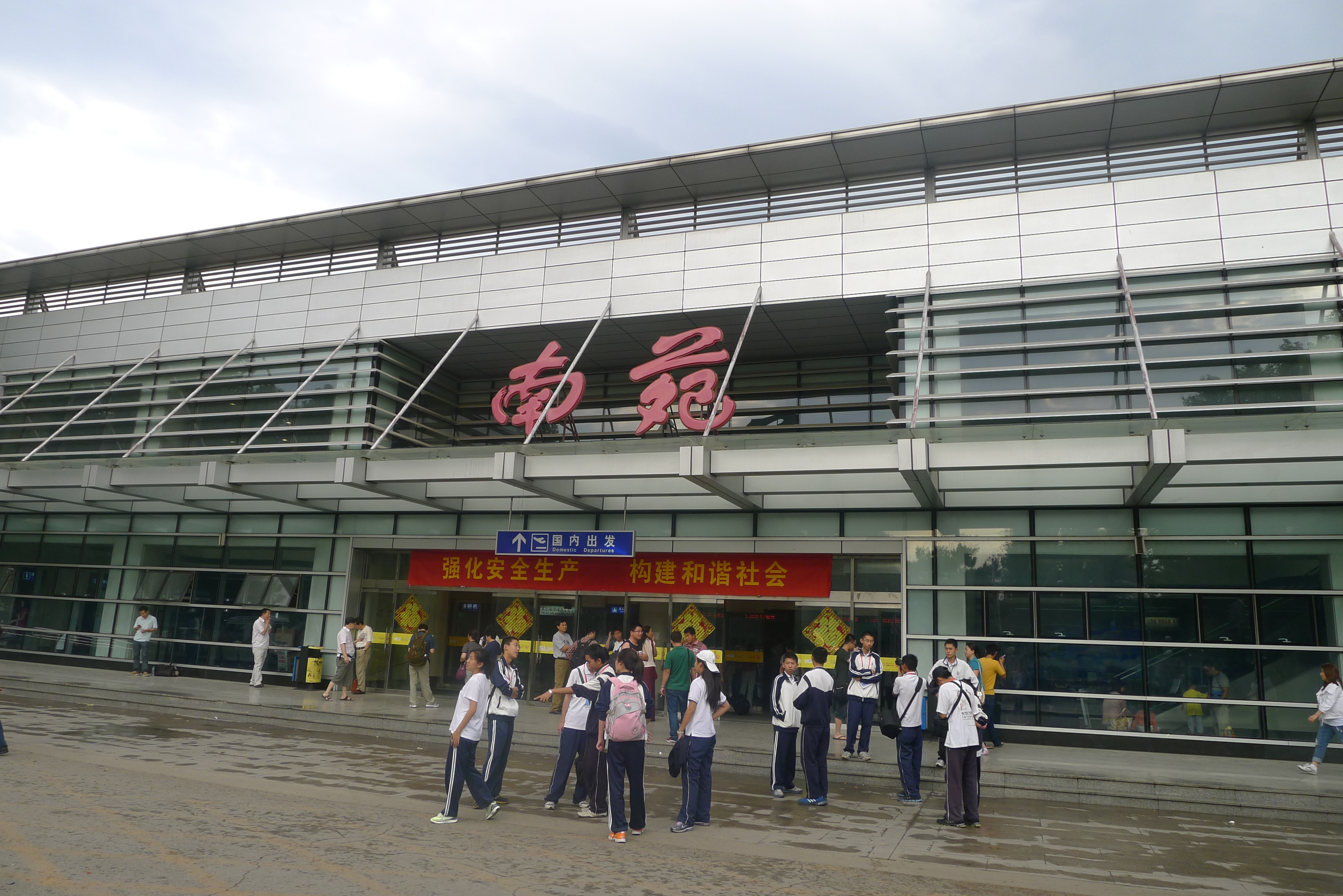
- IATA: NAY; ICAO: ZBNY

Summary
- Airport type: Defunct
- Location: Fengtai, Beijing, China
- Opened: 1910
- Closed: 30 September 2019 (military)
- Passenger services ceased: 25 September 2019
- Operating base for: China United Airlines (1986–2019)
- Coordinates: 39°47′03″N 116°23′39″E

Map
- Location of airport in Beijing

Runways
Direction	Length		Surface
Direction	m	ft	Surface
18/36	3,200	10,499	Concrete (closed)

Statistics (2018)
- Passenger: 6512740
- Aircraft movements: 44468
- Freight (in tonnes): 25,122.2

Beijing Nanyuan Airport
- Simplified Chinese: 北京南苑机场
- Traditional Chinese: 北京南苑機場
- Literal meaning: "South Garden Airport"
Transcriptions
Standard Mandarin
- Hanyu Pinyin: Běijīng Nányuàn Jīchǎng
- Wade–Giles: Pei^{3}-ching^{1} Nan^{2}-yüan^{4} Chi^{1}-chʻang^{3}
Yue: Cantonese
- Yale Romanization: Bei3 jing1 Nan2 ywan4 Ji1 chang3
- Jyutping: Baak^{1}ging^{1} Naam^{4}jyun^{2} Gei^{1}coeng^{4}

Beijing Nanyuan Airport (IATA: NAY, ICAO: ZBNY) was a People's Liberation Army Air Force Base and a secondary commercial airport of Beijing, the capital of China. Located in Fengtai District, 3 km (1.9 mi) south of the 4th Ring Road and 13 km (8.1 mi) from Tiananmen Square, Nanyuan Airport was first opened in 1910, making it the oldest airport in China. It was the main operating base for China United Airlines, which was also the airport's sole airline.

Nanyuan Airport ceased civil operations on 25 September 2019, after all commercial passenger flights (operated by China United Airlines) were moved to the newly opened Beijing Daxing International Airport. It remained operational as a People's Liberation Army Air Force military base for 5 more days until 30 September 2019, when the Beijing Nanjiao Airport (known as "New Nanyuan Airport" during construction, adjacent to Beijing Daxing Airport) opened.

== History ==
The first aircraft landed in the Nanyuan area in 1904. In July 1907, the government built rudimentary runways in Nanyuan's Yijun training ground (also known as the Wulidian soldier training ground) and used it for a light aircraft purchased from France.

In August 1910, the Qing government began to establish air transportation in China with the construction of a factory in Nanyuan to experiment with manufacturing aircraft, thereby officially opening the Nanyuan airport for regular use. Nanyuan airport was the first airport in China and one of the three operational airports opened before 1910s in the world. After the Xinhai Revolution, Yuan Shikai, who followed suggestions from the French advisers, established the first official flying academy in China in 1913, Nanyuan Flying Academy, with Li Ruyan as chief, and purchased 10 French Caudron trainer aircraft for 300,000 silver dollars. After the Second Zhili–Fengtian War, the academy was closed. However, the more than 100 pilots that trained in the academy over 4 terms have played important roles in China's aviation history. Later on, some of them become key persons in civil aviation.

In the brief episode of the Manchu Restoration led by Qing loyalist general Zhang Xun in July 1917, then-Premier Duan Qirui ordered a Caudron Type D aircraft piloted by Pan Shizhong (潘世忠) and bombardier Du Yuyuan (杜裕源) of the country's fledgling air force based in Nanyuan to fly to and drop bombs over the Forbidden City; three bombs were dropped, causing the death of a eunuch but otherwise minor damage.

During the Sino-Japanese War, the Japanese Army extended the airport, upgraded its air traffic control facilities, and changed the name to Nanyuan military camp. After the surrender of Japan in 1945, Nanyuan Airport became one of the most important airports for the Nationalist government and its air force. The private planes of Chiang Kai-shek and Fu Zuoyi have taken off from the Nanyuan Airport; many of Kuomintang's important military and government personnel have also boarded flights from Nanyuan. A Curtiss C-46 Commando also crashed near the airport in 1945.

During 1946 United States Marine Corps fighter squadron VMF-218 was based here.

In December 1948, the People's Liberation Army took control of the airport. In August 1949, the first flying brigade of the People's Liberation Army Air Force was formed here and they participated in the People's Republic of China Founding Ceremony's flying missions. Since then, Nanyuan Airport has been supporting the training of air and ground forces in all of the subsequent National Day Show of Force events.

In 1986, China United Airlines was established as a military-owned civil airline with special authorization to use military airports. Becoming the first commercial airline to serve Nanyuan, it turned the airbase into its main hub. It has continued to operate out of the airbase despite its 2004 privatization and sale to Shanghai Airlines.

In 2008, Nanyuan Airport witnessed a high growth rate. The total number of passengers served increased by 80.1%, reaching 1,357,038; total freight loaded/unloaded reached 13,243 tonnes, which was a 67% increase from the previous year. Traffic movements also had a very strong growth rate of 72.2%, registering 12,245.

Nanyuan Airport opened a new terminal in September 2013 with a designed passenger handling capacity of 6 million people. The previous terminal was capable of handling 2.8 million passengers during 2011.

Nanyuan ceased civil operation on 25 September 2019 after all commercial passenger flights were moved to the newly opened Beijing Daxing International Airport. It remained operational as a People's Liberation Army Air Force air base until late September 2019, when the Beijing Nanjiao Airport (known as "New Nanyuan Airport" during construction) opened.

== Former airlines and destinations ==
Airlines	Destinations
China United Airlines	Anshun, Arxan, Baicheng, Baotou, Bayannur, Bijie, Changsha, Changzhi, Chengdu, Chifeng, Chizhou, Datong, Dongying, Foshan, Fuyang, Guangzhou, Hailar, Hanzhong, Harbin, Hefei, Hengyang, Hohhot, Huai'an, Huaihua, Huizhou, Jinchang, Kunming, Lanzhou, Lianyungang, Linyi, Longnan, Longyan, Lüliang, Manzhouli, Nanyang, Ningbo, Ordos, Qingyang, Qiqihar, Quzhou, Rizhao, Sanming, Shanghai–Hongqiao, Shanghai–Pudong, Shangrao, Shenzhen, Shiyan, Songyuan, Tongliao, Tongren, Ulanhot, Ulanqab, Weihai, Wenzhou, Wuhai, Wuzhou, Xiamen, Xiangyang, Xilinhot, Xingyi, Xinyang, Yan'an, Yancheng, Yantai, Yichun, Yinchuan, Yingkou, Yongzhou, Yueyang, Yulin, Zhuhai

== See also ==
- Beijing Capital International Airport
- Beijing Daxing International Airport
- Beijing Xijiao Airport
- List of People's Liberation Army Air Force airbases
