= List of Tianjin Airlines destinations =

As of June 2026, Tianjin Airlines has a total of 389 routes, connecting 147 destinations in China and around the world.

== List ==
Country	City	Airport	Notes	Refs
Australia	Melbourne	Melbourne Airport		
Australia	Sydney	Sydney Airport		
Cambodia	Sihanoukville	Sihanoukville International Airport		
China	Aksu	Aksu Onsu Airport		
China	Altay	Altay Airport		
China	Anqing	Anqing Tianzhushan Airport		
China	Baotou	Baotou Donghe Airport		
China	Beijing	Beijing Capital International Airport		
China	Changchun	Changchun Longjia International Airport		
China	Changsha	Changsha Huanghua International Airport		
China	Changzhou	Changzhou Benniu International Airport		
China	Chengde	Chengde Puning Airport		
China	Chifeng	Chifeng Yulong Airport		
China	Chongqing	Chongqing Jiangbei International Airport	Focus city	
China	Dalian	Dalian Zhoushuizi International Airport	Focus city	
China	Dunhuang	Dunhuang Mogao International Airport		
China	Fuyang	Fuyang Xiguan Airport		
China	Fuzhou	Fuzhou Changle International Airport		
China	Guilin	Guilin Liangjiang International Airport		
China	Guiyang	Guiyang Longdongbao International Airport	Focus city	
China	Hailar	Hulunbuir Hailar Airport		
China	Hangzhou	Hangzhou Xiaoshan International Airport		
China	Harbin	Harbin Taiping International Airport		
China	Hefei	Hefei Xinqiao International Airport		
China	Hohhot	Hohhot Baita International Airport	Secondary hub	
China	Hotan	Hotan Airport		
China	Jiayuguan	Jiayuguan Airport		
China	Jinan	Jinan Yaoqiang International Airport		
China	Kunming	Kunming Changshui International Airport		
China	Lanzhou	Lanzhou Zhongchuan International Airport		
China	Linfen	Linfen Yaodu Airport		
China	Manzhouli	Manzhouli Xijiao Airport		
China	Meizhou	Meixian Airport		
China	Nanchang	Nanchang Changbei International Airport		
China	Nanjing	Nanjing Lukou International Airport		
China	Nanning	Nanning Wuxu International Airport	Focus city	
China	Ningbo	Ningbo Lishe International Airport		
China	Ordos	Ordos Ejin Horo International Airport		
China	Qingdao	Qingdao Jiaodong International Airport		
China	Quanzhou	Quanzhou Jinjiang International Airport		
China	Shanghai	Shanghai Hongqiao International Airport		
China	Shanghai	Shanghai Pudong International Airport		
China	Shantou	Jieyang Chaoshan International Airport		
China	Shenyang	Shenyang Taoxian International Airport		
China	Shijiazhuang	Shijiazhuang Zhengding International Airport		
China	Tacheng	Tacheng Airport		
China	Taiyuan	Taiyuan Wusu International Airport		
China	Tianjin	Tianjin Binhai International Airport	Hub	
China	Tongliao	Tongliao Airport		
China	Tongren	Tongren Fenghuang Airport		
China	Ulanhot	Ulanhot Yilelite Airport		
China	Ürümqi	Ürümqi Diwopu International Airport	Secondary hub	
China	Weifang	Weifang Nanyuan Airport		
China	Weihai	Weihai Dashuipo Airport		
China	Wenzhou	Wenzhou Longwan International Airport		
China	Wuhai	Wuhai Airport		
China	Wuhan	Wuhan Tianhe International Airport		
China	Wuxi	Sunan Shuofang International Airport		
China	Xi'an	Xi'an Xianyang International Airport	Secondary hub	
China	Xiamen	Xiamen Gaoqi International Airport		
China	Xilinhot	Xilinhot Airport		
China	Xingyi	Xingyi Wanfenglin Airport		
China	Yan'an	Yan'an Ershilipu Airport		
China	Yantai	Yantai Penglai International Airport		
China	Yichang	Yichang Sanxia Airport		
China	Yinchuan	Yinchuan Hedong International Airport		
China	Yining	Yining Airport		
China	Yulin	Yulin Yuyang Airport		
China	Yuncheng	Yuncheng Yanhu International Airport		
China	Zhengzhou	Zhengzhou Xinzheng International Airport		
Hong Kong	Hong Kong	Hong Kong International Airport		
Japan	Hakodate	Hakodate Airport		
Japan	Kitakyushu	Kitakyushu Airport		
Japan	Osaka	Kansai International Airport		
Japan	Sapporo	New Chitose Airport		
Japan	Shizuoka	Shizuoka Airport		
Japan	Tokyo	Haneda Airport		
Mongolia	Ulaanbaatar	Buyant-Ukhaa International Airport	Airport closed	
Mongolia	Ulaanbaatar	Chinggis Khaan International Airport		
New Zealand	Auckland	Auckland Airport	Terminated	
Russia	Kazan	Kazan International Airport	Terminated	
Russia	Moscow	Sheremetyevo International Airport	Seasonal	
Russia	Vladivostok	Vladivostok International Airport		
Singapore	Singapore	Changi Airport		
South Korea	Jeju	Jeju International Airport		
South Korea	Seoul	Incheon International Airport		
Thailand	Phuket	Phuket International Airport		
Turkey	Istanbul	Istanbul Airport		
United Kingdom	London	Heathrow Airport		
