= Erenhot Saiwusu International Airport =

Erenhot Saiwusu International Airport 二连浩特赛乌素国际机场
- IATA: ERL; ICAO: ZBER

Summary
- Airport type: Public
- Serves: Erenhot, Inner Mongolia
- Location: Saiwusu, Erenhot
- Opened: 1 April 2010 (16 years ago)
- Elevation AMSL: 1,014.3 m (3,328 ft)
- Coordinates: 43°25′36″N 112°05′54″E

Map
- Location in Inner Mongolia ERL/ZBER (China)

Runways
Direction	Length		Surface
Direction	m	ft	Surface
12/30	2,800	9,186

Statistics (2025)
- Passengers: 327,810
- Aircraft movements: 5,006
- Cargo (metric tons): 91.7

Erenhot Saiwusu International Airport
- Simplified Chinese: 二连浩特赛乌素国际机场
- Traditional Chinese: 二連浩特賽烏素國際機場
Transcriptions
Standard Mandarin
- Hanyu Pinyin: Èrliánhàotè Sàiwūsù Guójì Jīchǎng

Erenhot Saiwusu International Airport (IATA: ERL, ICAO: ZBER) is an airport serving the city of Erenhot, Inner Mongolia Autonomous Region, China. It is located near the town of Saiwusu, 27 km (17 mi) southeast of the city center and 32 km (20 mi) from the Mongolian border. Construction started in June 2008 with a total investment of 257 million yuan, and the airport was opened on 1 April 2010. Due to its proximity to the border the airport attracts a substantial portion of its passengers from Mongolia.

== History ==
In May 2007, the State Council and the Central Military Commission approved the project to build a new airport in Erenhot. On June 6, 2008, the construction project of Erenhot Saiwusu Airport was officially launched.

In August 2008, the Administration and the Development and Reform Commission of Inner Mongolia Autonomous Region approved the preliminary design and budget of Erenhot Saiwusu Airport. The construction of completed and passed final acceptance on October 18, 2009, successfully passed aircraft calibration on November 27, 2009, and successfully completed its test flight on December 16, 2009. On December 18, 2009, the airport passed the industry acceptance inspection. The airport was built to domestic 4C-level regional airport standards, with a total investment of 257 million yuan.

On February 11, 2010, Erenhot Saiwusu Airport successfully completed its maiden flight, and on April 1 of the same year, the airport officially opened to traffic, with its first route operated by Tianjin Airlines using an Embraer ERJ-145 regional jet.

On April 22, 2014, the expansion and renovation project of the airport received approval from the Civil Aviation Administration of China. The preliminary design and budget estimate for the project were approved on November 3, 2014. Construction of Terminal 2 began in the same year.

On June 21, 2016, the 2,800-meter runway at Erenhot Saiwusu Airport successfully completed its test flight. The test flight was conducted by Air China aircraft B-1769 (Boeing 737-800). On September 21, the airport's expansion and renovation project passed final acceptance. On August 25, 2017, Terminal 2 of the airport passed industry acceptance. On July 7, 2018, Terminal 2 of Erenhot Saiwusu Airport officially opened.

In 2024, Erenhot Saiwusu Airport was renamed Erenhot Saiwusu International Airport with the approval of the Civil Aviation Administration of China. On March 11, 2025, the Ministry of Civil Affairs officially announced the renaming of Erenhot Saiwusu Airport to Erenhot Saiwusu International Airport.

== Airlines and destinations ==
Airlines	Destinations
Beijing Capital Airlines	Beijing–Daxing
China Express Airlines	Hohhot, Xilinhot
Genghis Khan Airlines	Chifeng, Hohhot, Tongliao

== See also ==
- List of airports in China
- List of the busiest airports in China
