= RLK =

RLK may refer to:

- Ottawa Valley Railway, reporting mark RLK
- Bayannur Tianjitai Airport, IATA code RLK
