= Hulunbuir Hailar International Airport =

Airport in Inner Mongolia, China

Hulunbuir Hailar International Airport 呼伦贝尔海拉尔机场 ᠬᠥᠯᠦᠨ ᠪᠤᠢ᠌ᠷ ᠬᠠᠢ᠌ᠯᠠᠷ ᠣᠩᠭᠤᠴᠠ ᠶᠢᠨ ᠪᠠᠭᠤᠳᠠᠯ
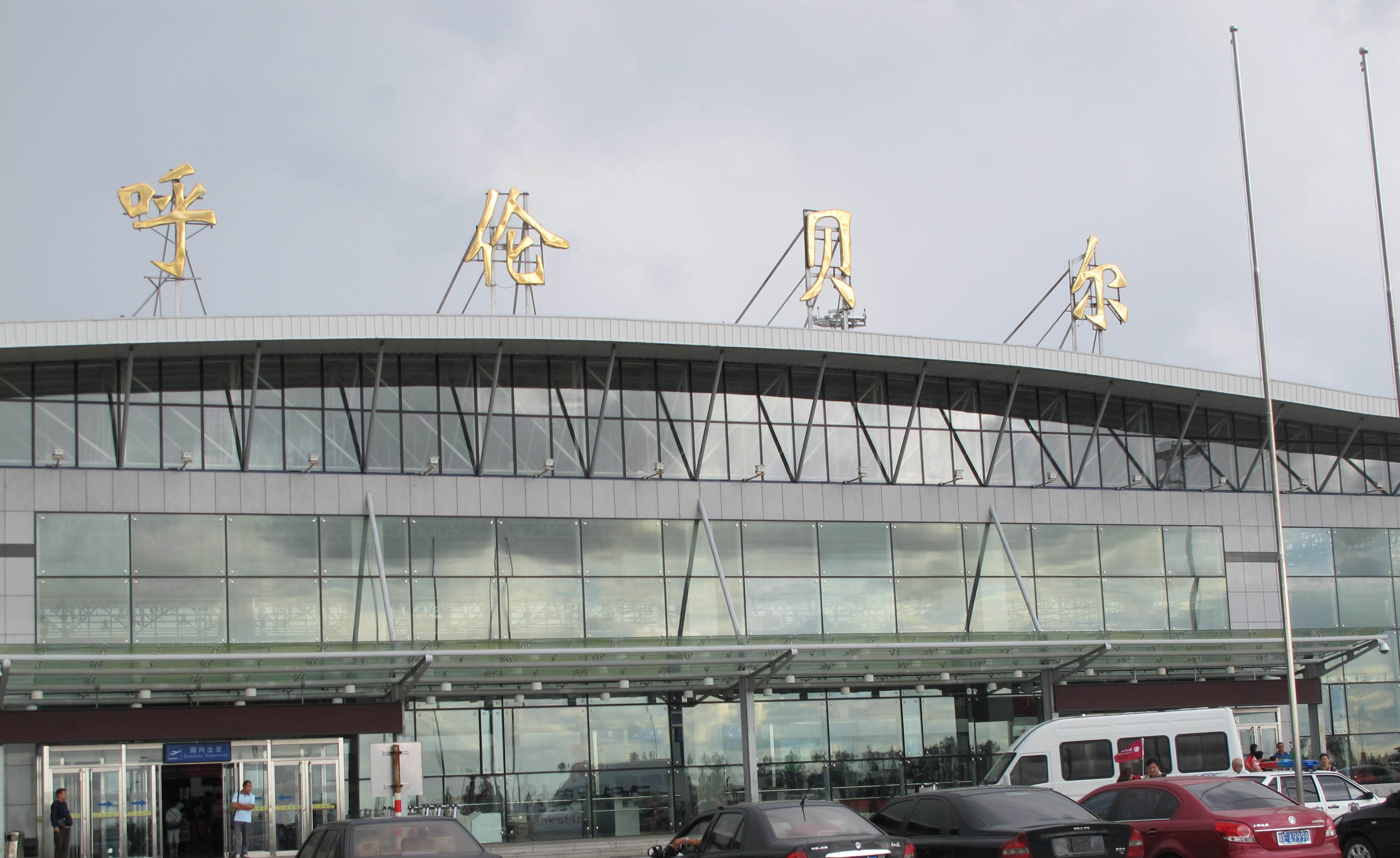
- IATA: HLD; ICAO: ZBLA

Summary
- Airport type: Public
- Serves: Hailar District, Hulunbuir, Inner Mongolia
- Elevation AMSL: 661 m (2,169 ft)
- Coordinates: 49°12′18″N 119°49′30″E

Maps
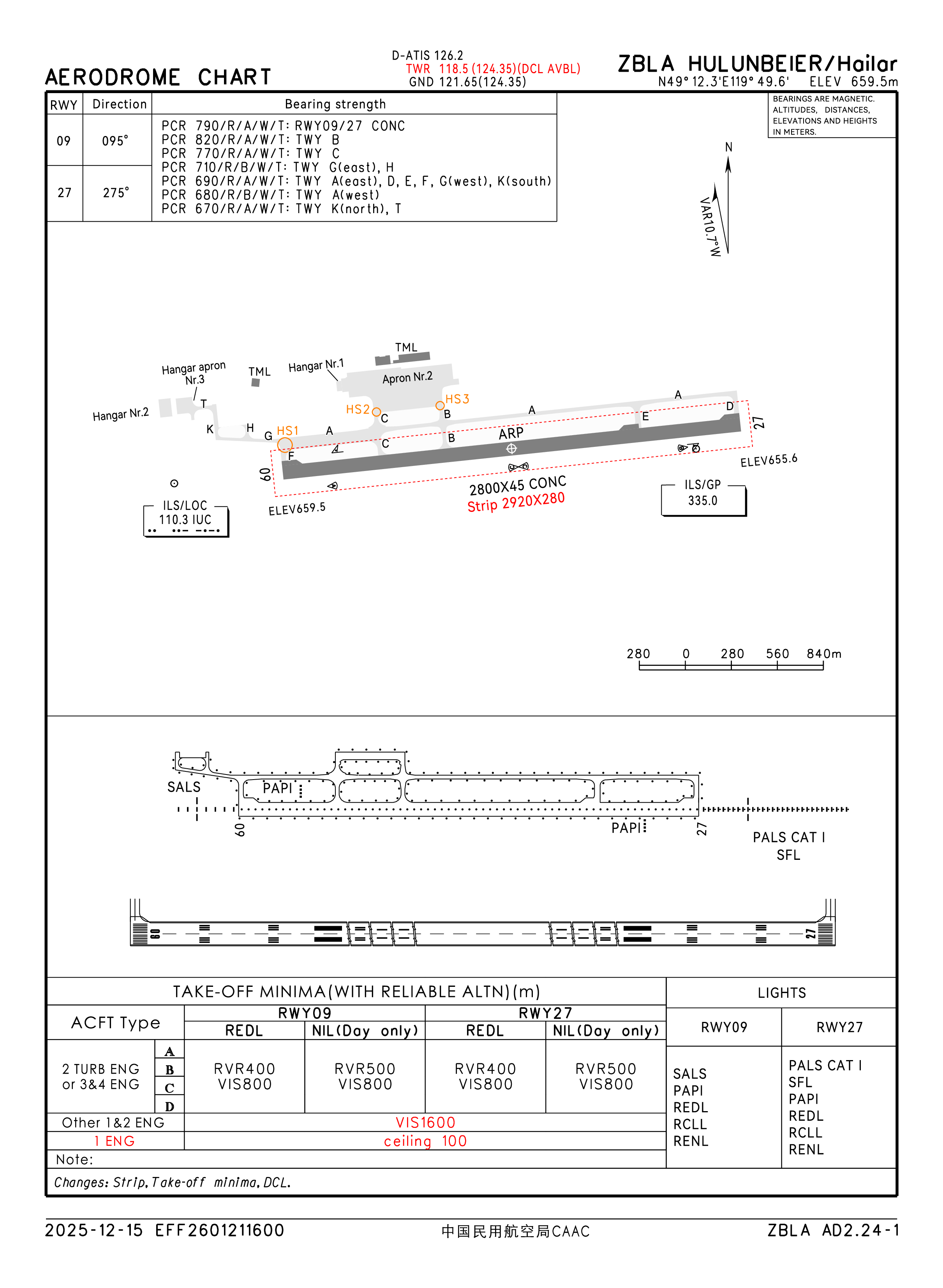
- CAAC airport chart

- Location in Inner Mongolia HLD/ZBLA (China)

Runways
Direction	Length		Surface
Direction	m	ft	Surface
09/27	2,800	9,186	Concrete

Statistics (2025)
- Passengers: 3,239,067
- Aircraft movements: 26,552
- Cargo (metric tons): 6,233.3

Hulunbuir Hailar International Airport
- Simplified Chinese: 呼伦贝尔海拉尔国际机场
- Traditional Chinese: 呼倫貝爾海拉爾國際機場
Transcriptions
Standard Mandarin
- Hanyu Pinyin: Hūlúnbèi'ěr Hǎilā'ěr Guójì Jīchǎng

Hulunbuir Hailar International Airport (IATA: HLD, ICAO: ZBLA) is an international airport serving Hailar District of Hulunbuir, a prefecture-level city of Inner Mongolia, China. The airport was formerly called Hailar Dongshan Airport (海拉尔东山机场) until it was renamed on 1 January 2011.

== History ==
Hailar Dongshan Airport was first built in 1932 at an elevation of 661 meters (2,169 feet). In the 1950s, it served as a stopover for two international routes: Beijing–Chita and Pyongyang–Chita. In 1958, air service between Hohhot and Hailar began. A new 2,273‑square‑meter passenger terminal was completed in 1980.

In 1988, Hulunbuir Prefecture invested in the construction of a new cement‑concrete runway measuring 1,800 meters long and 45 meters wide, capable of accommodating medium‑sized aircraft. Beginning in 1988, the airport underwent four rounds of expansion with a total investment of 54.3 million yuan. The runway was extended to 2,800 meters while retaining its 45‑meter width, with a 36‑centimeter‑thick concrete surface. The new runway was built 176 meters south of the original one, with its western end shifted 200 meters eastward. Each side was equipped with 7.5‑meter shoulders, giving a total width of 60 meters. The original runway was preserved as a parallel taxiway. During this period, the Civil Aviation Administration also installed an instrument landing system, night‑flight facilities, a VOR station, and near‑ and far‑range beacons, bringing the airport up to the 4C flight‑area standard and supporting operations by aircraft such as the Boeing 737 and BAE‑146.

A new passenger terminal, covering 7,655 square meters, entered service in 2007. The apron and blast‑protection area occupy 11,400 square meters. The newly built 2,800‑meter runway (45 meters wide, 36‑centimeter concrete surface) is located 176 meters south of the original runway, with the western end offset 200 meters eastward. Each side again includes 7.5‑meter shoulders, for a total width of 60 meters. The original runway was retained as a parallel taxiway, and the upgraded facilities allow the airport to handle aircraft such as the Boeing 767‑300.

On July 6, 1993, the State Council approved the opening of Hailar Airport as an international air port. On September 15, 1995, the State Council Port Office formally authorized its international opening. International service officially began on May 3, 1996, with the launch of the Hailar–Chita route, operated by Air China Inner Mongolia using the BAE‑146.

In August 2010, Hailar Dongshan Airport was renamed "Hulunbuir Hailar Airport". On June 8, 2012, construction began on the auxiliary terminal building of Hulunbuir Hailar Airport. On August 23, the auxiliary terminal building of Hulunbuir Hailar Airport was put into use. The project costed RMB4.5 million and covers an area of 1,500 square meters and consists of three yurts.

In 2016, the airport operated a total of 59 routes, including 5 international and 54 domestic routes, serving 45 cities and 27 airlines. Twelve new routes were launched that year. Annual passenger throughput reached 1,880,531, making it the largest regional airport by passenger volume in Inner Mongolia, as well as in the Northeast and North China regions.

On January 16, 2020, the Civil Aviation Administration of China (CAAC) North China Regional Administration officially approved the upgrade of Hulunbuir Hailar Airport's flight area classification from 4C to 4D, its fire and rescue level to Level 7, its medical rescue level to Level 6, and its ability to support the use of the largest aircraft type, the Boeing 757-200. An airport operating license was also issued. With this, Hulunbuir Hailar Airport became the first regional airport in Inner Mongolia Civil Aviation Airport Group Co., Ltd. with a flight area classification of 4D.

In 2025, the Hulunbuir Hailar Airport was approved by the Civil Aviation Administration of China to be renamed "Hulunbuir Hailar International Airport". Because Hulunbuir City is located in the northeastern part of Inner Mongolia Autonomous Region, bordering Russia and Mongolia, even though it wasn't previously known as an "international airport," Hulunbuir Airport has had international routes since the Hailar air port officially opened to the outside world in 1995. For example, it has 10 international routes to destinations such as Chita, Vladivostok, and Hong Kong. In 2025, Hulunbuir Airport's international passenger throughput exceeded 30,000, reaching a record high.

== Airlines and destinations ==
Airlines	Destinations
Air Chang'an	Tongliao, Xi'an
Air China	Beijing–Capital, Chita, Chongqing, Hohhot
Air Travel	Kunming, Qingdao
Chengdu Airlines	Hohhot, Jinan
China Eastern Airlines	Shanghai–Hongqiao
China Express Airlines	Baotou, Chifeng, Chongqing, Hohhot, Tongliao, Ulanhot, Xilinhot
China United Airlines	Beijing–Daxing, Shanghai–Pudong, Shijiazhuang
Fuzhou Airlines	Changchun, Qingdao
Genghis Khan Airlines	Hohhot, Tongliao, Zhalantun
Grand China Air	Beijing–Capital
Hebei Airlines	Beijing–Daxing
Hong Kong Airlines	Hong Kong
Juneyao Air	Shanghai–Hongqiao, Shanghai–Pudong, Shenyang
Loong Air	Guangzhou, Hohhot
Qingdao Airlines	Changsha, Hohhot
Shanghai Airlines	Hohhot, Shanghai–Hongqiao
Spring Airlines	Shanghai–Hongqiao, Shijiazhuang
Suparna Airlines	Hohhot, Shenzhen
Tianjin Airlines	Baotou, Chifeng, Haikou, Hohhot, Jiagedaqi, Ordos, Tianjin, Tongliao, Ulanhot, Ulanqib, Wuhan, Xi'an, Xilinhot, Zhengzhou

== See also ==
- List of airports in China
- List of the busiest airports in China
