= Xilinhot Airport =

Xilinhot Airport 锡林浩特机场
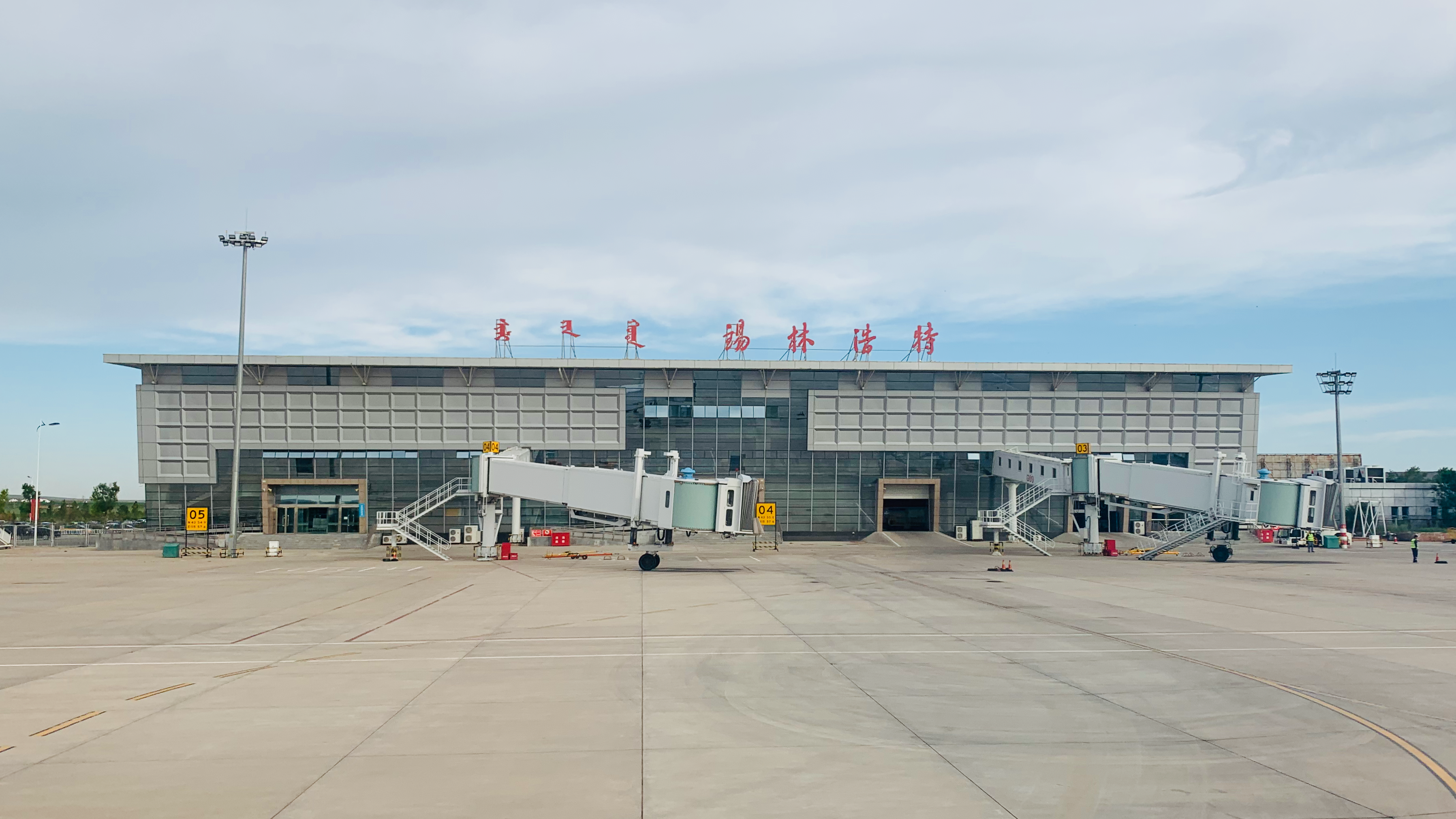
- IATA: XIL; ICAO: ZBXH

Summary
- Airport type: Public
- Serves: Xilinhot, Inner Mongolia, China
- Coordinates: 43°55′0″N 115°57′50″E

Map
- Location of airport in Inner Mongolia

Runways
Direction	Length		Surface
Direction	m	ft	Surface
04/22	2,800	9,186	Concrete

Statistics (2025)
- Passengers: 1,185,919
- Aircraft movements: 17,601
- Cargo (metric tons): 884.0

Xilinhot Airport
- Simplified Chinese: 锡林浩特机场
- Traditional Chinese: 錫林浩特機場
Transcriptions
Standard Mandarin
- Hanyu Pinyin: Xīlínhàotè Jīchǎng

Xilinhot Airport (IATA: XIL, ICAO: ZBXH) is an airport serving the city of Xilinhot in Inner Mongolia, China. It is located 9.5 kilometres (6 miles) southwest from the city center. It has a single runway that is 2,800 metres (9,186 feet) long and 45 metres (148 feet) wide (class 4C).

== History ==
Xilinhot Airport was established in 1958. On October 1, 1958, it launched the Beijing-Hohhot-Xilinhot route, marking the first civilian flight originating from the capital of Inner Mongolia Autonomous Region. On October 3, 1958, a second route, Hohhot-Xilinhot-Hailar, was opened. The opening of these two routes also promoted the development of tourism in Inner Mongolia. At the old site of Xilinhot Airport, there was a control tower less than 20 meters high and rudimentary facilities.

On July 22, 1992, the relocation and reconstruction project of Xilinhot Airport passed formal acceptance and was put into use. The new airport is located 9 kilometers southwest of Xilinhot City, covering a total area of 131.51 hectares. The flight area has a 3C technical level, a runway length of 1,800 meters, and can accommodate small and medium-sized aircraft up to the BAE-146. The terminal building has a floor area of 2,268 square meters and its exterior is shaped like a Mongolian yurt. After relocating to a new site in 1992 and undergoing several renovations and expansions, the current Air Traffic Support Department boasts a 23-meter-high control tower, a complete set of VHF communication equipment, a complete VAISALA weather observation and forecasting system, a VOR/DME omnidirectional beacon system, two NDB systems, and an ILS/DME system. It is equipped with Category I instrument landing system (ILS) and PBN operating conditions, achieving a high level of safety assurance capabilities. In the future, the Air Traffic Support Department will add an ADS-B surveillance system and an ILS/DME system to achieve local aircraft surveillance and bidirectional ILS/DME, further enhancing its safety assurance capabilities.

In 2001, Xilinhot Airport's flight area underwent expansion. The runway area increased from 1800m x 36m to 2500m x 45m, and the apron area increased from 6000 square meters to 18100 square meters, enabling it to accommodate aircraft up to the B737-300.

Since its construction, Xilinhot Airport had experienced relatively slow development, influenced by factors such as its remote location, poor regional economy, and market environment. In 2003, the airport had only two routes, one to Beijing and one to Hohhot, with only one flight every three days to Beijing and one flight every two days to Hohhot. The airport handled only 370 takeoffs and landings throughout the year, with a passenger throughput of only 16,464 and a cargo throughput of only 8.5 tons.

Construction of the Xilinhot Airport terminal expansion project began in August 2006.

In 2008, the airport's flight area could not meet the needs and needed to be renovated. The project passed industry acceptance, and the flight area was upgraded from 3C to 4C level. The apron area is 39,760 square meters and can accommodate 6 Category C aircraft and 1 Category D aircraft at the same time. The runway area was expanded to 2,800 meters × 45 meters, which can meet the needs of Boeing 737/800 full-weight take-off and landing and Boeing 767/300ER and smaller aircraft for emergency landing.

The new terminal was put into use in August 2009. The new terminal building has a total floor area of 5,847 square meters, with a ground floor area of 4,147 square meters and a mezzanine area of 1,700 square meters; the parking area is 5,000 square meters; the power center is a single-story building with a floor area of 425 square meters; the airfield and green space area is 21,142 square meters, and the total land area is 25,677 square meters.

To meet the rapidly growing demand for air traffic and enhance the capacity and service level of the existing terminal, the preliminary design for the Xilinhot Airport terminal upgrade project was officially approved by the Xilingol League Development and Reform Commission on December 9, 2019. The project involved a total investment of 16.0745 million yuan from local government funding, with the construction period from December 2019 to June 2020. The Xilinhot Airport terminal upgrade project included increasing the building area by 490.2 square meters; constructing a new boarding bridge at gate 5; and repairing or replacing the existing boarding bridges at gates 3 and 4.

On August 16, 2023, the Development and Reform Commission of Inner Mongolia Autonomous Region approved the feasibility study report for the second phase of the Xilinhot Airport expansion project with document No. Neifagai Tiehangzi (2023) 1055. The total investment for the second phase of the project was 390 million yuan, and the main construction contents were: T3 domestic terminal, air traffic control tower, control tower and related supporting facilities.

On December 29, 2023, the annual passenger throughput of Xilinhot Airport exceeded 1 million, which was the first time in the 65 years since the airport opened and made it the seventh airport in Inner Mongolia Autonomous Region with a passenger throughput of over 1 million.

== Airlines and destinations ==
Airlines	Destinations
Air China	Beijing–Capital, Beijing–Daxing, Hohhot, Shanghai–Pudong
Chengdu Airlines	Hohhot
China Express Airlines	Alxa Left Banner, Baotou, Chifeng, Chongqing, Erenhot, Hailar, Harbin, Hohhot, Jinan, Ulanqab, Wuhai, Xi'an
Genghis Khan Airlines	Chifeng, Hohhot, Ulanhot, Ulanqab
Tianjin Airlines	Bayannur, Hailar, Hohhot, Tianjin, Tongliao,

== See also ==
- List of airports in China
