= Wuhai Airport =

Airport in Inner Mongolia, China

Wuhai Airport 乌海机场
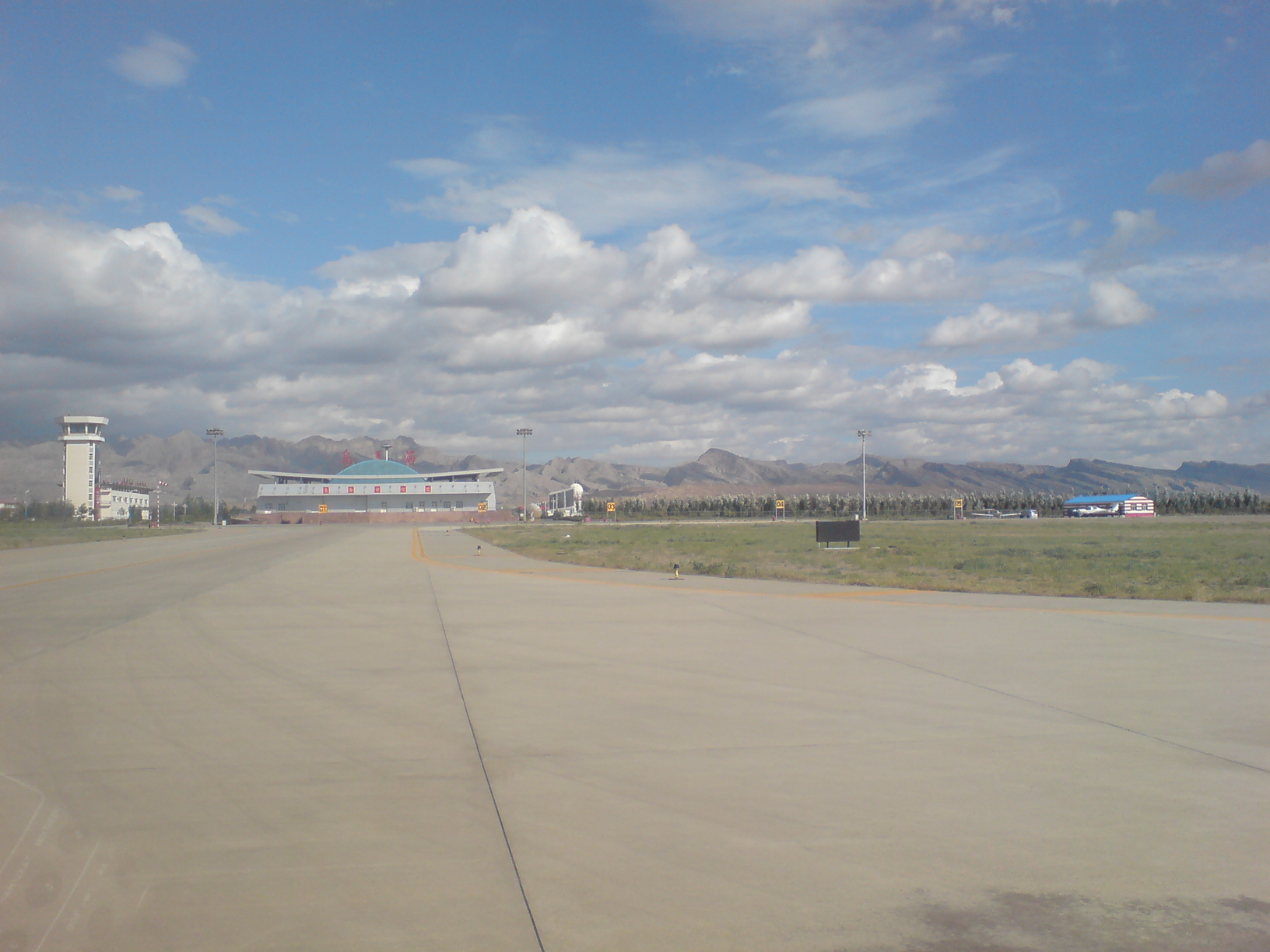
- IATA: WUA; ICAO: ZBUH

Summary
- Airport type: Public
- Serves: Wuhai, Inner Mongolia, China
- Opened: 12 December 2003; 22 years ago
- Coordinates: 39°47′31″N 106°48′12″E

Map
- Location of airport in Inner Mongolia

Runways
Direction	Length		Surface
Direction	m	ft	Surface
01/19	2,300	7,546	Concrete

Statistics (2025)
- Passengers: 770,945
- Aircraft movements: 7,556
- Cargo (metric tons): 647.2

Wuhai Airport
- Simplified Chinese: 乌海机场
- Traditional Chinese: 烏海機場
Transcriptions
Standard Mandarin
- Hanyu Pinyin: Wūhǎi Jīchǎng

Wuhai Airport (IATA: WUA, ICAO: ZBUH) is an airport in Wuhai, Inner Mongolia, China. It was opened in 2003.

== History ==
Wuhai Airport was built under the 10th five-year plan. On March 25, 2002, the ground-breaking ceremony for Wuhai Airport was held. The airport was designed to handle 70,000 passengers per day by 2010, with a peak hourly capacity of 100 passengers per day. It was built to a 3C-level flight zone, with a runway 2,300 meters long and 45 meters wide, and a total investment of 145 million yuan. The airport was managed under a locally owned system and operated as a shareholding company.

It officially commenced operations on December 12, 2003. The inaugural flight was operated by Hainan Airlines flight HU857 on the Beijing-Hohhot-Wuhai route, using a 32-seat twin-turboprop regional aircraft developed by Dornier Flugzeugwerke of Germany.

In 2006, Wuhai Airport underwent its second phase of expansion, with a total investment of 26.5 million yuan. The runway was extended to 2,600 meters, and the apron area increased to 23,350 square meters, enabling full-load takeoffs and landings for aircraft up to the Boeing 737-800 model.

In April 2008, the expansion project passed the flight procedure and minimum landing standard verification by the Civil Aviation Flight Inspection Center. On July 25, 2008, a Boeing 737-800 took off and landed twice from Wuhai Airport, testing the runway's smoothness and the functionality of the navigation lights. Following the successful test flights, the airport passed industry completion acceptance on July 26, 2008, and officially commenced operation.

On December 17, 2019, the passenger throughput of Wuhai Airport reached 500,000, marking the first time the airport's passenger throughput had exceeded 500,000, far below the initial design target of 700,000 passengers by 2010.

On December 5, 2009, the renovation and expansion project of the terminal area of Wuhai Airport commenced, and on August 15, 2010, the new terminal building was officially put into use.

On September 23, 2023, SF Airlines launched its maiden voyage for grape cargo from Wuhai Airport, using a Boeing B737-800F aircraft. The dedicated flight carried 12 tons of grapes and other goods to various parts of the country.

== Infrastructure ==
The airport is equipped with a runway with dimensions 2,300 by 45 metres (7,546 ft × 148 ft).

== Airlines and destinations ==
Airlines	Destinations
Air China	Beijing–Daxing
China Eastern Airlines	Hohhot, Shanghai–Hongqiao
China Express Airlines	Chengdu–Tianfu, Chifeng, Chongqing, Xilinhot
Genghis Khan Airlines	Hohhot
Hainan Airlines	Beijing–Capital
Juneyao Air	Hangzhou, Zhengzhou
Spring Airlines	Shenzhen, Wuhan
Tianjin Airlines	Hohhot, Tianjin, Tongliao, Xi'an

== See also ==
- List of airports in the People's Republic of China
