= Manzhouli Xijiao International Airport =

Airport in Inner Mongolia, China

Manzhouli Xijiao International Airport 满洲里西郊国际机场
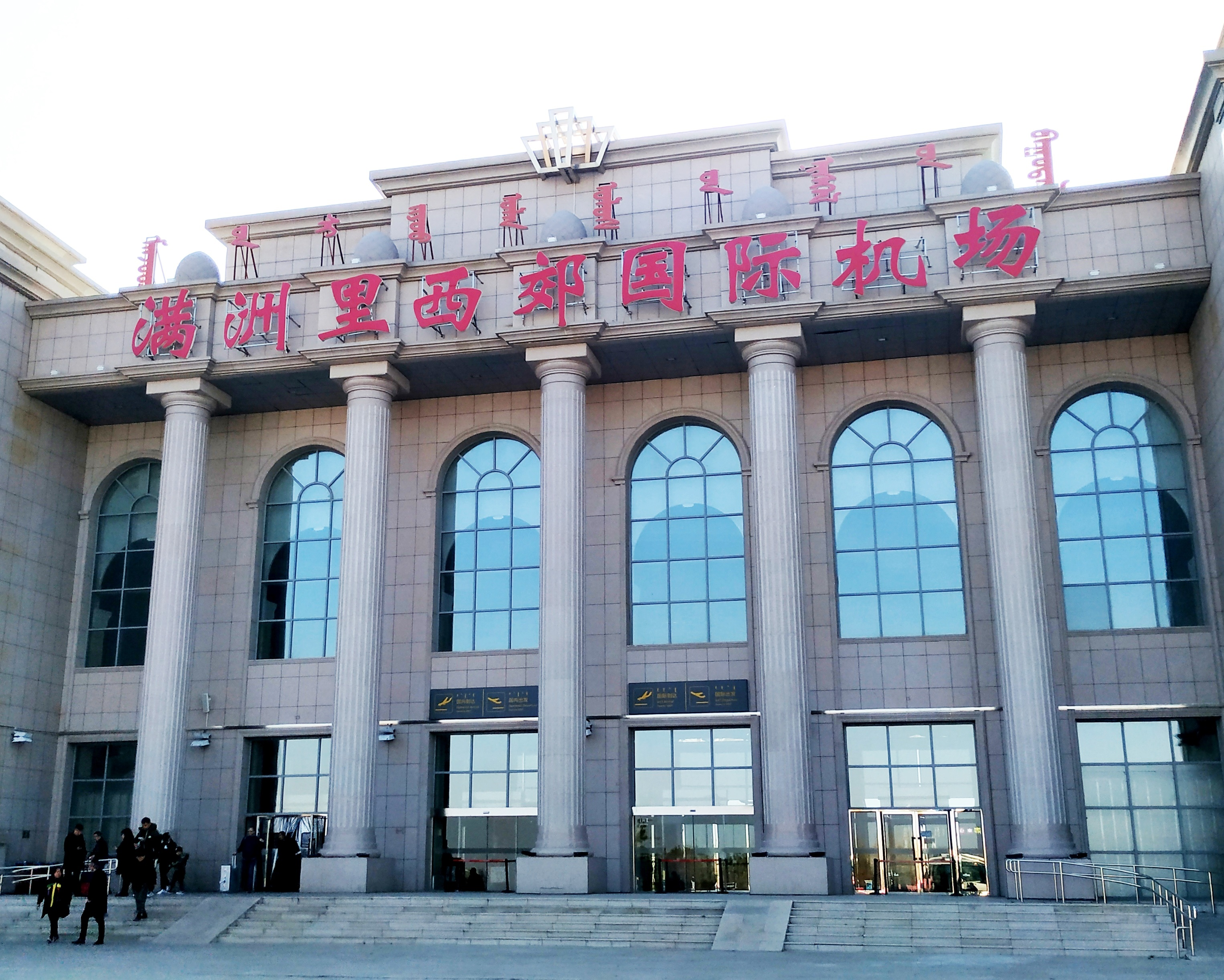
- IATA: NZH; ICAO: ZBMZ

Summary
- Operator: HNA Infrastructure Investment Group
- Serves: Manzhouli, Inner Mongolia, China
- Opened: 28 November 2004; 21 years ago
- Coordinates: 49°34′00″N 117°19′48″E

Map
- Location in Inner Mongolia NZH/ZBMZ (China)

Runways
Direction	Length		Surface
Direction	m	ft	Surface
12/30	2,800	9,186	Concrete

Statistics (2025)
- Passengers: 346,804
- Aircraft movements: 3,789
- Cargo (metric tons): 227.9

Manzhouli Xijiao International Airport
- Simplified Chinese: 满洲里西郊国际机场
- Traditional Chinese: 滿洲里西郊國際機場
Transcriptions
Standard Mandarin
- Hanyu Pinyin: Mǎnzhōulǐ Xījiāo Guójì Jīchǎng

Manzhouli Xijiao International Airport (IATA: NZH, ICAO: ZBMZ) is an airport serving Manzhouli, a city in the autonomous region of Inner Mongolia in the People's Republic of China.

== History ==
On November 8, 2002, the State Planning Commission officially approved the construction of Manzhouli Xijiao Airport. The construction of the airport officially commenced on April 15, 2003. The airport was completed on November 28, 2004, and a test flight was conducted on the same day. It was officially opened to traffic on February 25, 2005. The airport had a 3C flight zone rating, with a runway that was 2,400 meters long and 45 meters wide, and an apron area of 12,727 square meters, which could accommodate two Category C aircraft.

On May 1, 2006, the construction of the flight area for the second phase expansion project of Manzhouli Xijiao Airport officially broke ground. The costs of the project was 290 million yuan. Major works included extending the runway to 2,800 meters, enabling it to accommodate Boeing 767-200. The flight zone classification had been upgraded to 4D, the new apron could accommodate seven aircraft, and the new terminal building capable of handling 2 million passengers annually and 1,400 passengers during peak hours. On January 20, 2007, the second phase expansion project of Manzhouli Xijiao Airport was completed, and a Boeing 767 passenger plane conducted a test flight.

On 4 February 2009, the State Council of the People's Republic of China officially approved Manzhouli Xijiao Airport to open as a national first‑class aviation port.

In March 2026, with the approval of the Civil Aviation Administration of China, Manzhouli Xijiao Airport was officially renamed Manzhouli Xijiao International Airport.

== Airlines and destinations ==
Airlines	Destinations
Air China	Hohhot
China Express Airlines	Hohhot
Genghis Khan Airlines	Chifeng, Hohhot
Grand China Air	Beijing–Capital
Hunnu Air	Ulaanbaatar
IrAero	Irkutsk, Krasnoyarsk
Tianjin Airlines	Tianjin, Tongliao

== See also ==
- List of airports in China
