= Chifeng Yulong Airport =

Airport in Inner Mongolia, China

Chifeng Yulong Airport 赤峰玉龙机场
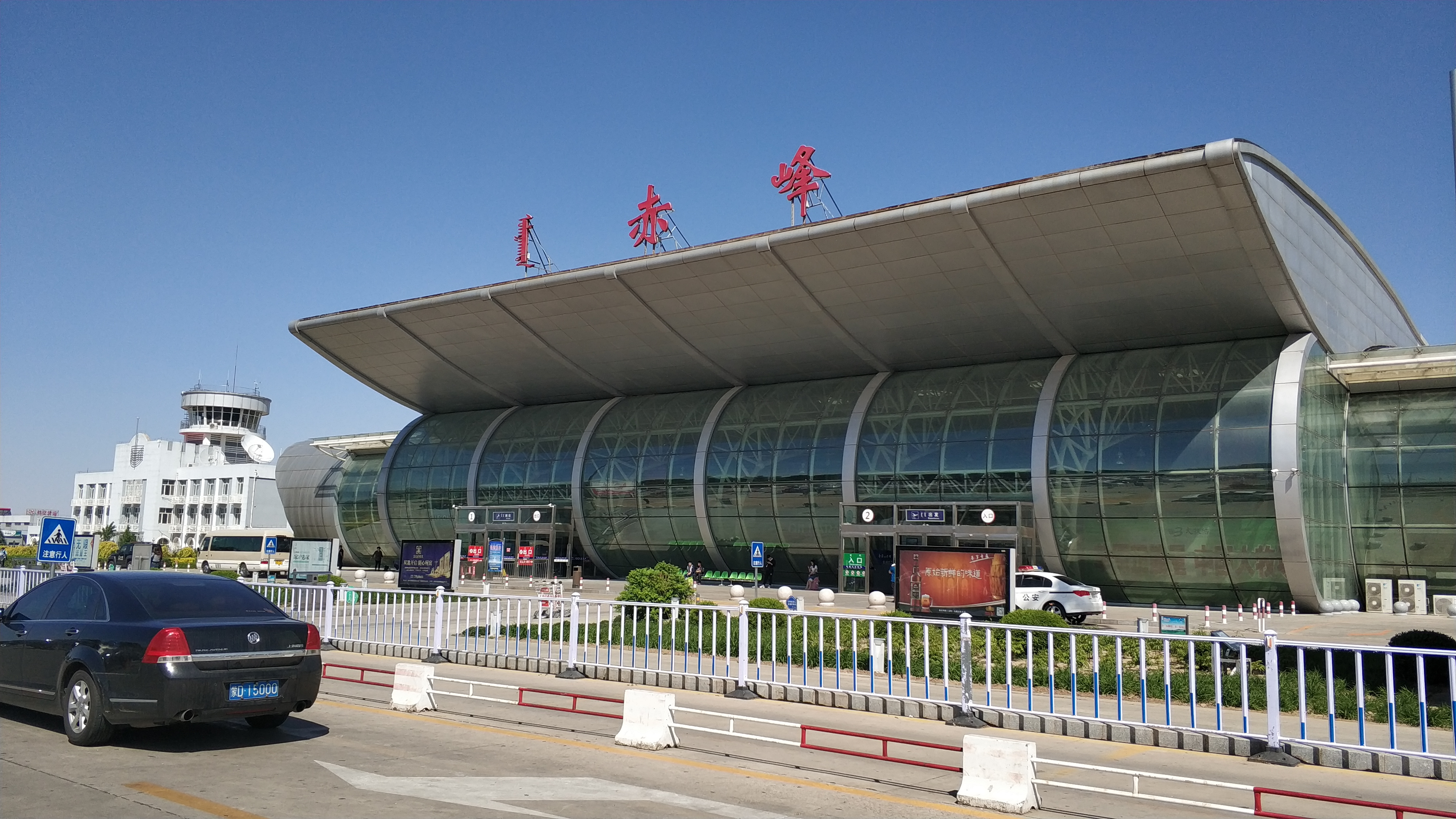
- IATA: CIF; ICAO: ZBCF

Summary
- Airport type: Public
- Serves: Chifeng, Inner Mongolia, China
- Elevation AMSL: 615 m (2,018 ft)
- Coordinates: 42.15486°N 118.83462°E

Map
- Location of airport in Inner Mongolia

Runways
Direction	Length		Surface
Direction	m	ft	Surface
03/21	2,800	9,186	Concrete

Statistics (2025)
- Passengers: 1,900,454
- Aircraft movements: 20,369
- Cargo (metric tons): 2,029.9
- Source: CAAC

Chifeng Yulong Airport
- Simplified Chinese: 赤峰玉龙机场
- Traditional Chinese: 赤峰玉龍機場
Transcriptions
Standard Mandarin
- Hanyu Pinyin: Chìfēng Yùlóng Jīchǎng

Chifeng Yulong Airport (IATA: CIF, ICAO: ZBCF) is an airport serving Chifeng, a city in the autonomous region of Inner Mongolia in China.

== History ==
Chifeng Airport, originally built in 1958, was a makeshift airport during the Japanese occupation.

After the founding of the People's Republic of China in 1949, the airport was used as a military reserve airport. The Zhaowuda League and Chifeng City governments began repairing it in August 1958 by mobilizing the people for voluntary labour and the airport was named Chifeng Station of the Civil Aviation Administration of China. The airport has a 1,600-meter-long and 50-meter-wide dirt runway, as well as dirt taxiways and aprons, were built. At the same time, 1,710 square meters of brick-and-wood and earthen-timber structure bungalows were also constructed.

The airport was officially opened to traffic in 1959. It was a national 3C-class airport with a dirt and unpaved runway 1600 meters long and 50 meters wide, and a taxiway 165 meters long and 18 meters wide. The apron area was 6000 square meters, and the terminal building was 2098 square meters. It could handle various aircraft up to the BAC146 size day and night. The apron area was 600 square meters, and the terminal building was 2098 square meters. It possessed an omnidirectional beacon, north-south and near-south station communication systems, VHF ground control communication systems, TES and PES satellite ground stations, navigation lights, satellite cloud image receiving systems, and a series of other advanced communication and navigation equipment, providing strong communication and navigation support capabilities.

Chifeng's original civil airport—Chifeng Xijiao Airport—was approved in December 2004 by the State Council and the Central Military Commission for relocation and joint military–civilian reconstruction together with the Air Force's Chifeng base. The new airport site was located at Tuchengzi (土城子) in present‑day Niujiayingzi Town, Kalaqin Banner, roughly 15–20 km from central Chifeng, replacing the old airfield in Hongshan District.

Construction of the new joint‑use facility began on August 25, 2006, and the project was completed on October 20, 2007, passing industry acceptance on December 15, 2007. On March 20, 2008, the entire civil aviation operation was officially relocated from Chifeng Xijiao Airport to the new site, which was formally named Chifeng Yulong Airport (赤峰玉龙机场). The old airport was permanently closed the same day.

Upon opening, Chifeng Yulong Airport operated as a 4C‑class military–civilian airport, capable of handling Boeing 737‑800 / Airbus A320 and similar aircraft day and night, significantly improving regional connectivity and supporting Chifeng's economic development. The airport had a 4,921-square-meter terminal building and a 17,496-square-meter apron.

In 2014, the existing apron was renovated, adding two Class C and one Class B aircraft stands on the northeast side, allowing the apron to simultaneously accommodate five Class C and one Class B aircraft. Subsequently, the boarding corridor and three boarding bridges, along with the renovation of the apron's fire protection, drainage, and navigation lighting systems, were also completed and put into use, further improving the infrastructure of Chifeng Airport. In 2016, the Chifeng Airport's automatic weather observation system, air-to-ground VHF communication system, navigation beacon power supply upgrade project, and PBN flight procedures all successfully passed industry acceptance and are operating well.

In 2017, the terminal exit channels were upgraded, and dual-channel X-ray machines for passenger inspection and dual-view X-ray machines for passenger screening were added. Passenger information counters and the terminal's mother-and-baby room were also upgraded. Through the implementation of various infrastructure construction projects, Chifeng Airport's basic support capabilities have been continuously improved. In April 2019, following organizational restructuring within the Inner Mongolia Civil Aviation Airport Group, the airport's operating entity was renamed the Chifeng Branch of Inner Mongolia Autonomous Region Civil Aviation Airport Group Co., Ltd.

In 2020, the second phase of the expansion and renovation project of Chifeng Military and Civilian Airport was implemented. The main construction contents include: extending the existing runway 300 meters to the southwest, bringing the total length to 2,800 meters; extending the existing parallel taxiway 1,805 meters to the northeast and 300 meters to the southwest to match the length of the extended runway; constructing 142-meter-long connecting taxiways at the north and south ends of the runway; adding 11 Category C aircraft parking positions and 1 independent aircraft parking position on the south side of the existing apron, as well as related supporting facilities. From 00:00 on September 18, 2020 to 24:00 on September 27, 2020, Chifeng Yulong Airport in Inner Mongolia was officially closed and suspended for 10 days due to renovation and expansion projects. During this period, runway construction was the main focus.

== Facilities ==
The airport has one runway which is 2,800 metres (9,186 ft) long.

== Airlines and destinations ==
Airlines	Destinations
9 Air	Guangzhou, Wuxi
Air China	Hohhot
Beijing Capital Airlines	Haikou, Shijiazhuang
China Express Airlines	Alxa Left Banner, Baotou, Chengdu–Tianfu, Chongqing, Hailar, Hangzhou, Hohhot, Jinan, Luoyang, Ordos, Shijiazhuang, Ulanqab, Wuhai, Xi'an, Xilinhot, Zhengzhou
Genghis Khan Airlines	Erenhot, Hohhot, Manzhouli, Xilinhot, Zhalantun
GX Airlines	Holingol, Jinan
Juneyao Air	Changsha, Guiyang, Hangzhou, Nanjing, Qingdao, Shanghai–Pudong, Wenzhou
Loong Air	Baotou, Xi'an
Tianjin Airlines	Hailar, Hohhot, Shijiazhuang, Tianjin, Ulanhot, Wuhan, Xi'an

== See also ==
- List of airports in China
