= Ordos Ejin Horo International Airport =

Airport in Inner Mongolia, China

Ordos Ejin Horo International Airport 鄂尔多斯伊金霍洛国际机场
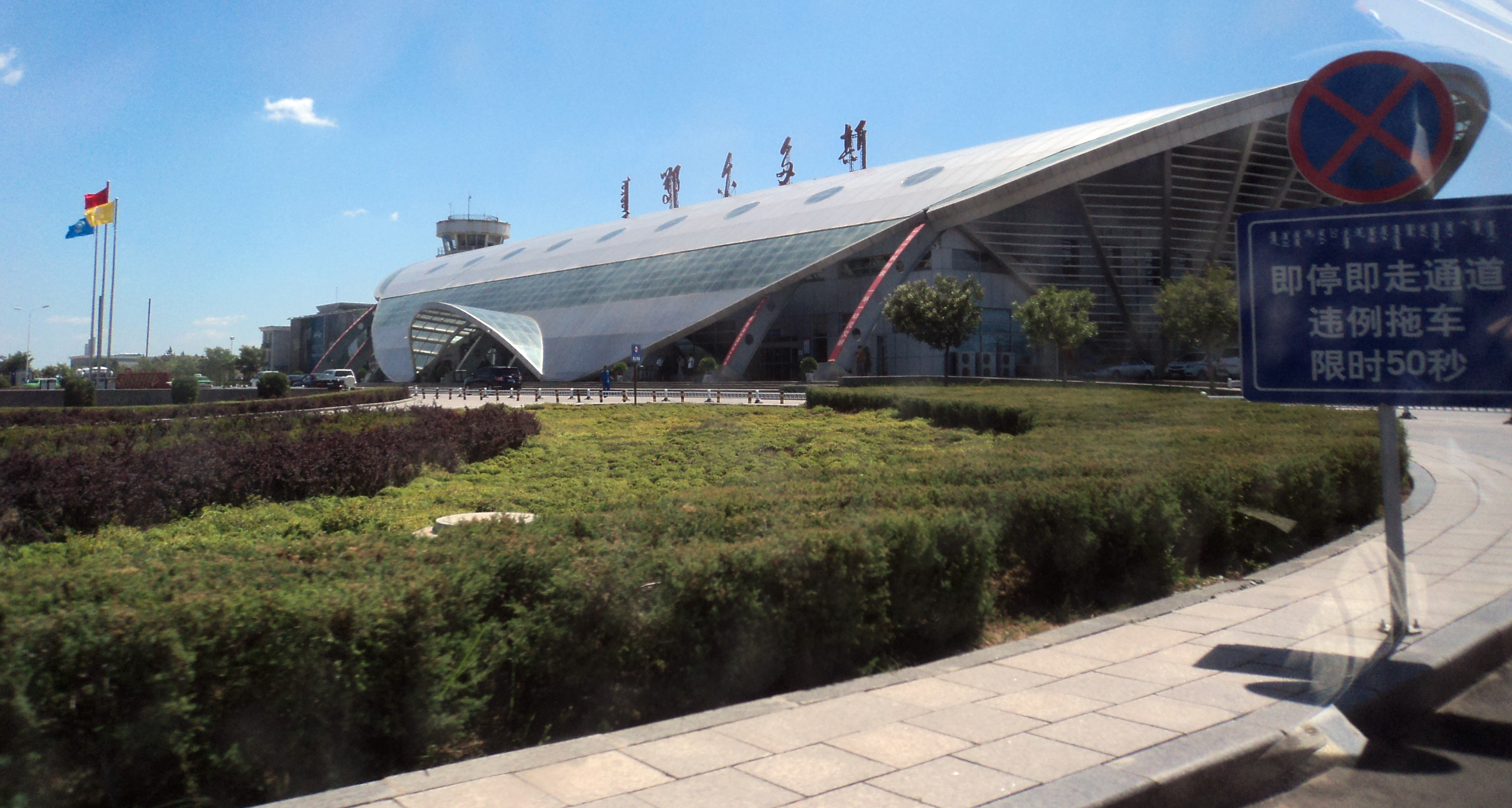
- Ordos Airport's domestic passenger terminal
- IATA: DSN; ICAO: ZBDS

Summary
- Airport type: Public
- Serves: Ordos, Inner Mongolia
- Location: Ejin Horo Banner, Inner Mongolia
- Opened: 26 July 2007; 19 years ago
- Coordinates: 39°29′38″N 109°51′44″E

Maps
- CAAC airport chart
- Location in Inner Mongolia DSN/ZBDS (China)

Runways
Direction	Length		Surface
Direction	m	ft	Surface
13/31	3,200	10,499	Asphalt

Statistics (2025)
- Passengers: 3,201,398
- Aircraft movements: 38,370
- Cargo (metric tons): 13,367.8
- Source: List of the busiest airports in the People's Republic of China

Ordos Ejin Horo International Airport
- Simplified Chinese: 鄂尔多斯伊金霍洛国际机场
- Traditional Chinese: 鄂爾多斯伊金霍洛國際機場
Transcriptions
Standard Mandarin
- Hanyu Pinyin: È'ěrduōsī Yījīn Huòluò Guójì Jīchǎng

Ordos Ejin Horo International Airport (IATA: DSN, ICAO: ZBDS) is an airport serving Ordos City in China's Inner Mongolia Autonomous Region. It is located in Ejin Horo Banner. First built in 1959 and called Dongsheng Airport, the airport ceased operation in 1983. In 2005 the airport was rebuilt at the current site with an investment of 350 million yuan, and re-opened in July 2007.

== History ==
The predecessor of Ordos Ejin Horo International Airport was Dongsheng Airport. Construction of Dongsheng Airport began in 1959, intended primarily to resolve the transportation difficulties between Dongsheng and Baotou caused by the Yellow River barrier. At the time, only a few seasonal flights were operated. After the completion of the Baotou Yellow River Bridge in October 1983, the Baotou–Dongsheng air route was discontinued, and the airport was subsequently closed.

In January 2000, the league government decided to relocate and rebuild the airport. Dongsheng Airport was officially decommissioned on July 26, 2007, when all operations were transferred to the newly constructed Ordos Ejin Horo Airport.

On March 25, 2005, the State Council and the Central Military Commission approved the relocation and reconstruction of Ordos Airport. Construction officially began on July 18 of the same year. After the airport was completed, the municipal government repurchased it in full, making it a large, wholly state‑owned enterprise funded entirely by the city and overseen by the Municipal State‑owned Assets Supervision and Administration Commission. The completed Ordos Airport covers an area of 5,300 mu, with a 4C‑class airfield featuring a runway 2,400 meters long and 45 meters wide, capable of accommodating Boeing 737‑800 aircraft and smaller types. The apron covers 17,500 square meters and can simultaneously park two Class‑C aircraft and one Class‑B aircraft. The terminal building has a floor area of 5,280 square meters and is equipped with two boarding bridges. The airport was designed for an annual passenger throughput of 270,000 and an annual cargo and mail capacity of 0.2 tons.

Two years later, in May 2007, Ordos Ejin Horo Airport was completed. On June 5, the airport finished its flight‑inspection procedures, and on June 28 it successfully conducted its test flight, carried out by Air China using a Boeing 737‑800. The airport passed industry acceptance on July 5, obtained its civil airport operating license on July 20, and officially opened to traffic on July 26, with

Ordos Airport officially opened to traffic on July 26, 2007, and is a wholly owned subsidiary of the Ordos Airport Management Group. The airport lay 38 kilometers from downtown Dongsheng, situated 16 kilometers southeast of Ordos City's Kangbashi New District, close to the tourist site of the Mausoleum of Genghis Khan and conveniently located at the junction of the Baomao Expressway and the A-Da Highway. Covering an area of 8,700 mu, the airport has a 4E‑class airfield with a 3,200‑meter‑long, 45‑meter‑wide runway capable of accommodating large aircraft such as the Boeing 747. The inaugural flight, operated by Air China's Boeing 737-800, connected to Beijing Capital International Airport and took off at 10:30 a.m.

Since its opening, Ordos Airport has experienced rapid growth in passenger numbers, far exceeding its original design capacity. As a result, expansion work began as early as 2008 and received approval from the North China Regional Administration of Civil Aviation in 2009. The new terminal building entered service on January 30, 2013. Covering 100,300 square meters, it is designed to handle up to 12 million passengers annually. The terminal is equipped with 13 boarding bridges and 14 aircraft stands. Inside, it features two check‑in islands (A and B) with a total of 32 check‑in counters, seven dual‑channel security lanes for domestic passengers, three single‑channel lanes for international passengers, and a 10,000‑square‑meter VIP area containing 34 lounges.

In 2015, Ordos Airport was rated a four‑star airport by the UK‑based Skytrax evaluation agency, becoming the eighth airport in China and the thirty‑fourth worldwide to receive this honor. In November 2015, the airport's airfield classification was upgraded to 4E, making it the first regional airport in North China to reach this level. In November 2016, its aviation port of entry passed national inspection, granting it official status as an open international air gateway, and its name was formally changed to Ordos Ejin Horo International Airport.

On July 17, 2017, with the smooth landing of flight U6879 from Moscow, Ordos International Airport officially inaugurated its first intercontinental route. This milestone also marked the formal opening of fifth‑freedom traffic rights in the civil aviation market of the Inner Mongolia Autonomous Region.

The construction of the new parallel taxiway at Ordos Airport commenced in September 2019. The main works include airfield engineering, navigation lighting, perimeter security, and supporting facilities. The airfield engineering includes the construction of one new parallel taxiway, four connecting taxiways, five Category E aircraft stands, and supporting drainage and navigation lighting systems. The project was completed in December 2020 and successfully passed the industry acceptance inspection. At 6:40 a.m. on May 19, 2021, China Eastern Airlines flight MU2426, en route from Ordos to Xi'an, taxied onto the newly built parallel taxiway and took off, marking the official opening of the parallel taxiway at Ordos International Airport.

On June 19, 2024, China United Airlines officially launched its international route from Cheongju, South Korea to Ordos. On July 6, Vietjet Air launched its international inbound route from Hanoi, Vietnam to Ordos. On August 17, the direct international route from Ordos to Ulaanbaatar, Mongolia, was officially launched, marking the first time Ordos International Airport has opened a direct round-trip route to Ulaanbaatar.

== Facilities ==
Ordos Airport has a runway that is 3,200 meters (10,498 ft 8 in) long and 60 meters (196 ft 10 in) wide (class 4E).

The airport has two terminals: a main international terminal building with 11 jet bridges and a VIP Lounge. It also has a smaller domestic terminal nearby with two jet bridges.

The terminal buildings were completed in 2012 by an architectural group consisting of China Architecture Design & Research Group, Zhongxu Planning and Architecture Design Company, Limited, B+H Architects.

== Airlines and destinations ==
Airlines	Destinations
Air China	Beijing–Capital, Chengdu–Tianfu, Hangzhou, Tianjin
Batik Air Malaysia	Charter: Kuala Lumpur–International
China Eastern Airlines	Harbin, Hefei, Hong Kong, Jinan, Kunming, Lanzhou, Qingdao, Rizhao, Shanghai–Hongqiao, Shanghai–Pudong, Shijiazhuang, Taiyuan, Wuhan, Wuxi, Xi'an, Xining, Yangzhou, Yinchuan
China Express Airlines	Alxa Left Banner, Chifeng, Chongqing, Guiyang, Hohhot, Tongliao
China Southern Airlines	Guangzhou, Sanya, Shenzhen, Zhengzhou
China United Airlines	Beijing–Daxing, Changsha, Kuqa, Nanjing, Qionghai, Seoul–Incheon, Turpan, Ulaanbaatar, Vientiane, Yantai; Seasonal: Daegu
Genghis Khan Airlines	Tongliao
GX Airlines	Jining
Hunnu Air	Ulaanbaatar
Jiangxi Air	Shenyang
LJ Air	Changchun, Haikou, Harbin, Sanya, Shenzhen
Shanghai Airlines	Changchun, Changsha
Sichuan Airlines	Chengdu–Tianfu
Tianjin Airlines	Hailar, Ulanhot
Urumqi Air	Fuzhou, Urumqi
XiamenAir	Lianyungang

== Transportation ==
Access to the airport is mainly by car with a large parking area and connected by G65 Highway and Airport Highway (toll).

== See also ==
- List of airports in China
- List of the busiest airports in China
