= Baotou Donghe International Airport =

Airport serving Baotou, Inner Mongolia, China

Baotou Donghe International Airport 包头东河国际机场 ᠪᠤᠭᠤᠲᠤ ᠳᠦᠩᠬᠧᠣᠯᠣᠨᠤᠨ ᠨᠢᠰᠡᠬᠦ ᠪᠠᠭᠤᠳᠠᠯ
- IATA: BAV; ICAO: ZBOW

Summary
- Airport type: Public
- Serves: Baotou
- Location: Donghe District, Inner Mongolia, China
- Opened: 1934; 92 years ago
- Elevation AMSL: 1,012 m (3,320 ft)
- Coordinates: 40°33′35″N 109°59′48″E

Map
- Location in Inner Mongolia BAV/ZBOW (China)

Runways
Direction	Length		Surface
Direction	m	ft	Surface
13/31	2,800	9,186	Asphalt

Statistics (2025)
- Passengers: 1,965,255
- Aircraft movements: 17,521
- Cargo (metric tons): 3,624.0

Baotou Donghe International Airport
- Simplified Chinese: 包头东河国际机场
- Traditional Chinese: 包頭東河國際機場
Transcriptions
Standard Mandarin
- Hanyu Pinyin: Bāotóu Dōnghé Guójì Jīchǎng

Baotou Donghe International Airport (IATA: BAV, ICAO: ZBOW) is an airport serving the city of Baotou in Inner Mongolia, China. Eurasia Aviation Corporation, a joint venture between Ministry of Transportation and Communications of China and Lufthansa, built the airport in 1934. The airport was occupied by Japan in World War II. It was renovated and expanded multiple times to support the growing demands during the war.

== History ==
=== Hailan Pao Airport Period ===
In 1934, the airport was built and opened to traffic by Eurasian Air Mail Co., Ltd., a joint venture between the Ministry of Transport of the National Government and Lufthansa. The airport is about 14 miles away from the city. It was used to take off and land 4-seat aircraft with a speed of 165 kilometers per hour. It was originally named Hailanpao Airport.

=== Erliban Airport Period ===
In 1956, Hailanpao Airport established the China Civil Aviation Baotou Station and the airport was renamed Erliban Airport In 1986, the second-generation terminal building of Baotou Erliban Airport was put into use. In 1999, the third-generation terminal building (today's T1 terminal) of Baotou Erliban Airport was opened. In 2006, the runway extension construction was completed, with a length of 2,800 meters. On 29 December 2014, Terminal T2 was officially opened.

In June 2016, the air port of Baotou Erliban Airport was approved to be temporarily opened to the outside world from 1 July to 31 December 2016. On 3 August of the same year, the airport opened its first international route. Mongolian Hun Airlines used Fokker F50 aircraft to fly the round-trip route from Ulaanbaatar to Baotou. This marked the official opening of the Baotou air port and ended the local history of no international routes.

=== Donghe Airport period ===
In March 2018, Baotou Erliban Airport was officially renamed Baotou Donghe Airport with the approval of the Civil Aviation Administration of China. On 8 November 2019, the Baotou Donghe Airport air port received approval from the State Council and was officially opened to the outside world. On 23 December 2023, the Baotou Donghe Airport air port opened to the outside world and passed national acceptance. In October 2024, Baotou Donghe Airport was approved by the Civil Aviation Administration of China to be renamed Baotou Donghe International Airport.

== Airlines and destinations ==
Airlines	Destinations
Air China	Beijing–Capital, Wuhan
China Express Airlines	Changsha, Chifeng, Haikou, Hailar, Harbin, Luoyang, Meizhou, Qinhuangdao, Shenyang, Shijiazhuang, Xi'an, Zhengzhou
China Southern Airlines	Guangzhou, Zhengzhou
Genghis Khan Airlines	Tongliao, Ulanhot
Loong Air	Chifeng, Xi'an
Shandong Airlines	Taiyuan, Xiamen
