= Ulanhot Yilelite Airport =

Airport in Inner Mongolia, China

Ulanhot Yilelite Airport 乌兰浩特义勒力特机场
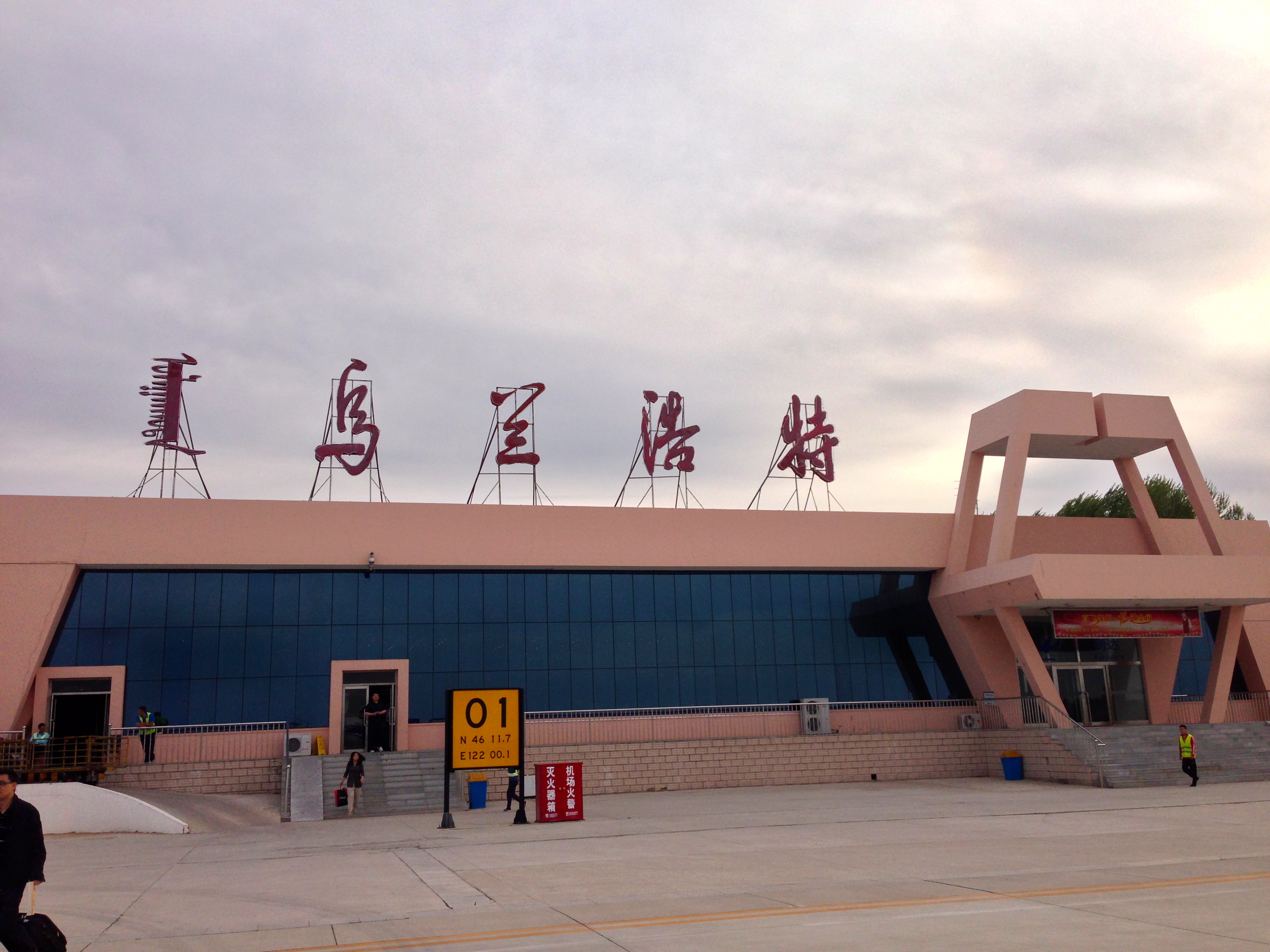
- IATA: HLH; ICAO: ZBUL

Summary
- Airport type: Public
- Serves: Ulanhot, Inner Mongolia
- Location: Yilelite, Ulanhot
- Opened: 5 April 1995; 31 years ago
- Coordinates: 46°11′48″N 122°00′18″E

Map
- Location of airport in Inner Mongolia

Runways
Direction	Length		Surface
Direction	m	ft	Surface
14/32	2,600	8,530	Concrete

Statistics (2025)
- Passengers: 1,107,433 ▲0.5%
- Cargo (metric tons): 845.8 ▲27.8%
- Aircraft movements: 41,691 ▼19.9%
- Sources: China's busiest airports by passenger traffic, CAAC

Ulanhot Yilelite Airport
- Simplified Chinese: 乌兰浩特义勒力特机场
- Traditional Chinese: 烏蘭浩特義勒力特機場
Transcriptions
Standard Mandarin
- Hanyu Pinyin: Wūlánhàotè Yìlèlìtè Jīchǎng

Ulanhot Yilelite (Yileleeteuk) Airport (IATA: HLH, ICAO: ZBUL) is an airport in Ulanhot, Inner Mongolia, China.

== History ==
Ulanhot Airport has a unique historical background—it was built in 1958 as a simple airport during the Japanese occupation. Located on Wangye Temple Street (now northwest of Ulanhot), 4.3 kilometers from the city center, it covers an area of 2.8 square kilometers and has two runways: a 1,400-meter concrete main runway and a 600-meter dirt runway as a secondary runway. The airport had no perimeter, and people could freely walk through the airport area. Whenever a plane was about to land or take off, the staff would shout at the top of their lungs, "Get off the runway immediately!"

On May 10, 1992, construction officially began on the new site of Ulanhot Airport, located in Yilelite Town, Ulanhot City, Inner Mongolia Autonomous Region. This project was a relocation and reconstruction undertaken to adapt to the development of modern civil aviation, replacing the small old airport built in 1958. The opening of the new airport significantly promoted the development of local air passenger transport.

On April 5, 1995, the new Ulanhot Airport was officially opened to traffic, with its first route being the Ulanhot-Tongliao-Beijing-Hohhot route operated by Air China Inner Mongolia Branch.

The airport expansion project officially broke ground on July 25, 2006. The project extended the airport runway from 1800m to 2600m, widen the main runway from 36m to 45m, and increased the shoulder width on both sides by 1.5m, resulting in a total runway width of 48m; expanded the apron area from 6000 square meters to 13200 square meters, designed to accommodate two Category C aircraft simultaneously. On December 22, 2006, the project completed its first test flight, with the first takeoff and landing of a Boeing 737-800 aircraft. On May 25, 2008, the maiden voyage of a Boeing 737-700 aircraft from Ulanhot to Beijing Nanyuan Airport ended the airport's history of only being able to accommodate small aircraft.

In April 2013, the airport expansion project was officially launched. The project aims to achieve an annual passenger throughput of 1.2 million and an annual cargo throughput of 3,000 tons by 2025, with a total investment of 260 million RMB. Construction includes: building a new 2,600-meter-long and 45-meter-wide runway 176 meters northeast of the existing runway centerline; building a new 260.5-meter-long and 105-meter-wide apron; and constructing an apron with six Category C aircraft parking positions and two perpendicular connecting taxiways.

On July 4, 2013, the expansion project of the airport terminal area was approved by the Development and Reform Commission of the Autonomous Region. The total budget of the project was RMB 383.8838 million, including ancillary projects such as a new office building of 1,500 square meters, an air traffic control building (including the tower) of 1,500 square meters, a fire station of 2,100 square meters, a garage of 3,000 square meters, a heat exchange station, a sewage treatment station, etc., with a total investment of RMB 27 million.

On September 16, 2014, the expansion project of the flight area passed the completion acceptance. On September 26, the new runway successfully passed the calibration flight. On October 15, the new runway successfully completed its test flight. On January 8, 2015, the new runway of the airport was officially put into use, and the old runway, which had been in service for 20 years, was decommissioned and used as a taxiway.

In 2015, Ulanhot Airport was renamed Ulanhot Yilelite Airport.

== Airlines and destinations ==
Airlines	Destinations
Air China	Beijing–Capital, Hohhot
China Express Airlines	Arxan, Baotou, Hailar Hohhot, Shenyang
China Southern Airlines	Guangzhou, Wuhan
China United Airlines	Beijing–Daxing
Genghis Khan Airlines	Baotou, Changchun, Hohhot, Tongliao Ulanqab, Xilinhot
Juneyao Air	Shanghai–Pudong
Tianjin Airlines	Chifeng, Chongqing, Hailar, Hohhot, Ordos, Xi'an

== See also ==
- List of airports in China
