= Shijiazhuang Zhengding International Airport =

Airport serving Shijiazhuang, Hebei, China

Shijiazhuang Zhengding International Airport 石家庄正定国际机场
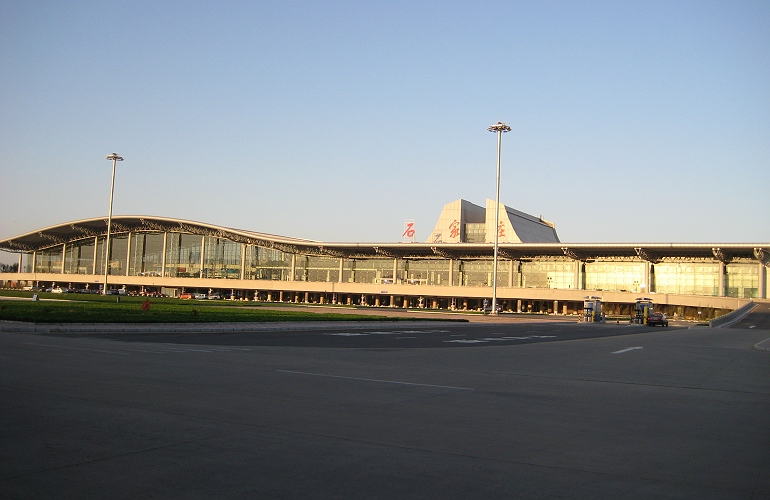
- IATA: SJW; ICAO: ZBSJ

Summary
- Airport type: Public
- Operator: Hebei Airport Management Group; Capital Airport Holding
- Serves: Shijiazhuang
- Location: Xinchengpu, Zhengding, Hebei, China
- Opened: 18 February 1995; 31 years ago
- Hub for: Hebei Airlines
- Operating base for: China United Airlines; Spring Airlines
- Elevation AMSL: 71 m (233 ft)
- Coordinates: 38°16′51″N 114°41′48″E
- Website: www.hebeiairport.cn

Maps
- CAAC airport chart
- Location in Hebei Location in China

Runways
Direction	Length		Surface
Direction	m	ft	Surface
15/33	3,400	11,155	Concrete

Statistics (2025)
- Passengers: 12,014,301
- Tonnes of cargo: 66,422.0
- Aircraft movements: 85,717

Shijiazhuang Zhengding International Airport
- Simplified Chinese: 石家庄正定国际机场
- Traditional Chinese: 石家莊正定國際機場
Transcriptions
Standard Mandarin
- Hanyu Pinyin: Shíjiāzhuāng Zhèngdìng Guójì Jīchǎng

Shijiazhuang Zhengding International Airport (IATA: SJW, ICAO: ZBSJ) is an international airport serving Shijiazhuang, the capital of North China's Hebei province. The airport is the hub for Hebei Airlines and the operating base for both China United Airlines and Spring Airlines. It is also one of the few airports in China where the Antonov An-225 was able to operate. According to the Civil Aviation Administration of China, in 2025, Shijiazhuang Zhengding International Airport recorded 85,717 flight takeoffs and landings, and 12.014 million passenger movements, representing a year-on-year increase of 2.8% and 6.2% respectively.

== History ==
Shijiazhuang Zhengding Airport was opened in 1995. It was renamed to Shijiazhuang Zhengding International Airport in July 2008.

Due to the COVID-19 pandemic, flights bound for Beijing were redirected to Shijiazhuang and other nearby airports to minimize imported cases.

== Airlines and destinations ==
=== Passenger ===
Airlines	Destinations
Air China	Chengdu–Tianfu, Hohhot
Beijing Capital Airlines	Changchun, Chifeng, Guangyuan, Guangzhou, Haikou, Hangzhou, Harbin, Lijiang, Sanya, Shenyang, Taizhou, Ürümqi, Xi'an, Xishuangbanna, Yichang
Chengdu Airlines	Chengdu–Shuangliu, Chengdu–Tianfu, Guyuan, Harbin, Hohhot, Qinhuangdao, Wenzhou
China Eastern Airlines	Dalian, Hefei, Huai'an, Lanzhou, Nanchang, Ordos, Shanghai–Pudong, Yinchuan
China Express Airlines	Baotou, Chengde, Chengdu–Tianfu, Chifeng, Chongqing, Qinhuangdao, Qiqihar, Zhangjiakou
China Southern Airlines	Dalian, Guangzhou, Ürümqi
China United Airlines	Baicheng, Hailar, Kunming, Qionghai, Sanya, Shanghai–Pudong, Wenzhou, Xiamen, Yiwu
Chongqing Airlines	Guangzhou
Donghai Airlines	Shenzhen, Wuxi
Hainan Airlines	Dalian, Fuzhou, Guiyang, Lanzhou, Lianyungang, Shihezi, Urumqi
Hebei Airlines	Chengde, Chengdu–Tianfu, Chongqing, Guangzhou, Guiyang, Haikou, Hangzhou, Hohhot, Hong Kong, Korla, Kunming, Mianyang, Nanjing, Nantong, Sanya, Shanghai–Hongqiao, Shanghai–Pudong, Shenyang, Shenzhen, Ulanqab, Ürümqi, Xiamen, Zhangjiakou
Jeju Air	Busan, Seoul–Incheon
Kunming Airlines	Kunming
Lucky Air	Changchun, Chengdu–Tianfu, Dali, Harbin, Kunming, Luzhou, Xishuangbanna, Zunyi–Maotai
Okay Airways	Changchun, Shenzhen
Qingdao Airlines	Changchun, Shenyang, Xishuangbanna
Shenzhen Airlines	Shenzhen
Sichuan Airlines	Chengdu–Tianfu, Songyuan
Spring Airlines	Bangkok–Suvarnabhumi, Beihai, Changchun, Chengdu–Tianfu, Chongqing, Dalian, Fuzhou, Guangzhou, Guilin, Guiyang, Hailar, Hangzhou, Harbin, Hohhot, Jieyang, Kunming, Lanzhou, Mangshi, Mianyang, Nanning, Ningbo, Quanzhou, Sanya, Seoul–Incheon, Shanghai–Hongqiao, Shenzhen, Tokyo–Narita, Tongliao, Ürümqi, Xiamen, Xining, Yinchuan, Zhangjiajie, Zhangjiakou, Zhuhai
Tianjin Airlines	Chifeng, Huizhou, Yanji, Yichang, Yingkou, Yulin (Shaanxi)
West Air	Chongqing
Xizang Airlines	Chengdu–Shuangliu, Lhasa, Shigatse–Peace, Xining

=== Cargo ===
Airlines	Destinations
China Postal Airlines	Nanjing, Seoul–Incheon, Tokyo–Narita, Zhengzhou
Hong Kong Air Cargo	Hong Kong
SF Airlines	Changsha, Hangzhou, Ningbo
Uzbekistan Airways	Ostrava
YTO Cargo Airlines	Bishkek

== Ground transportation ==
=== Inter-terminal transportation ===
The airport provides a free inter-terminal shuttle bus between Terminals 1/2 and Zhengding Airport railway station. They operate every 30 minutes from 6:30 am to 8:30 pm.

=== Rail ===
The Beijing–Guangzhou–Shenzhen–Hong Kong High-Speed Railway passes within about 3 km south of the airport's terminal. A few trains a day stop at Zhengding Airport railway station, providing convenient service to Shijiazhuang railway station and a few other key stations in the Beijing/Hebei/Henan/Shanxi region.

It takes under 15 minutes for a D- or G-series train to travel from Zhengding Airport railway station to Shijiazhuang railway station.

Shijiazhuang Airport Authority views the railway as an important tool to attract passengers to the airport, not just from Shijiazhuang, but from the wider region as well. They have announced a program providing air passengers flying to Shijiazhuang with free train tickets to station such as Beijing West and Zhengzhou; passengers arriving to the airport by train and leaving by plane can have the cost of their train tickets reimbursed as well.

=== Bus ===
There are 5 bus routes to and from points throughout the city, including Hebei Stadium, Jinyuan Hotel, Shijiazhuang Railway Station, Dongkaifaqu, and Hoton Hotel. The airport buses run to each of the two terminals and cost up to ¥20 per ride, depending on the route. The airport buses accept only paper tickets that are sold at each terminal and certain bus stops in the city. The airport also offers inter-city bus services to and from neighboring cities, including Baoding, Dingzhou, Anguo, Gaoyang, Xiong'an, Baigou, Xingtai, Hengshui, Anping, Shenzhou, Handan, Cangzhou, Yangquan, Dezhou, Xinji, Zhengding, and Luquan.

=== Taxi ===
Taxi stations are set on the arrival floor of both Terminal 1 and Terminal 2. The expense is determined by the meter. It usually costs around ¥100 from Zhongshandonglu Air Ticket Office to the airport.

== See also ==
- List of airports in China
- List of the busiest airports in China
