= Hohhot Baita International Airport =

Airport serving Hohhot, Inner Mongolia, China

Hohhot Baita International Airport 呼和浩特白塔国际机场 ᠬᠥᠬᠡᠬᠣᠲᠠ ᠣᠯᠠᠨ ᠤᠯᠤᠰ ᠦᠨ ᠨᠢᠰᠬᠦ ᠪᠠᠭᠤᠳᠠᠯ
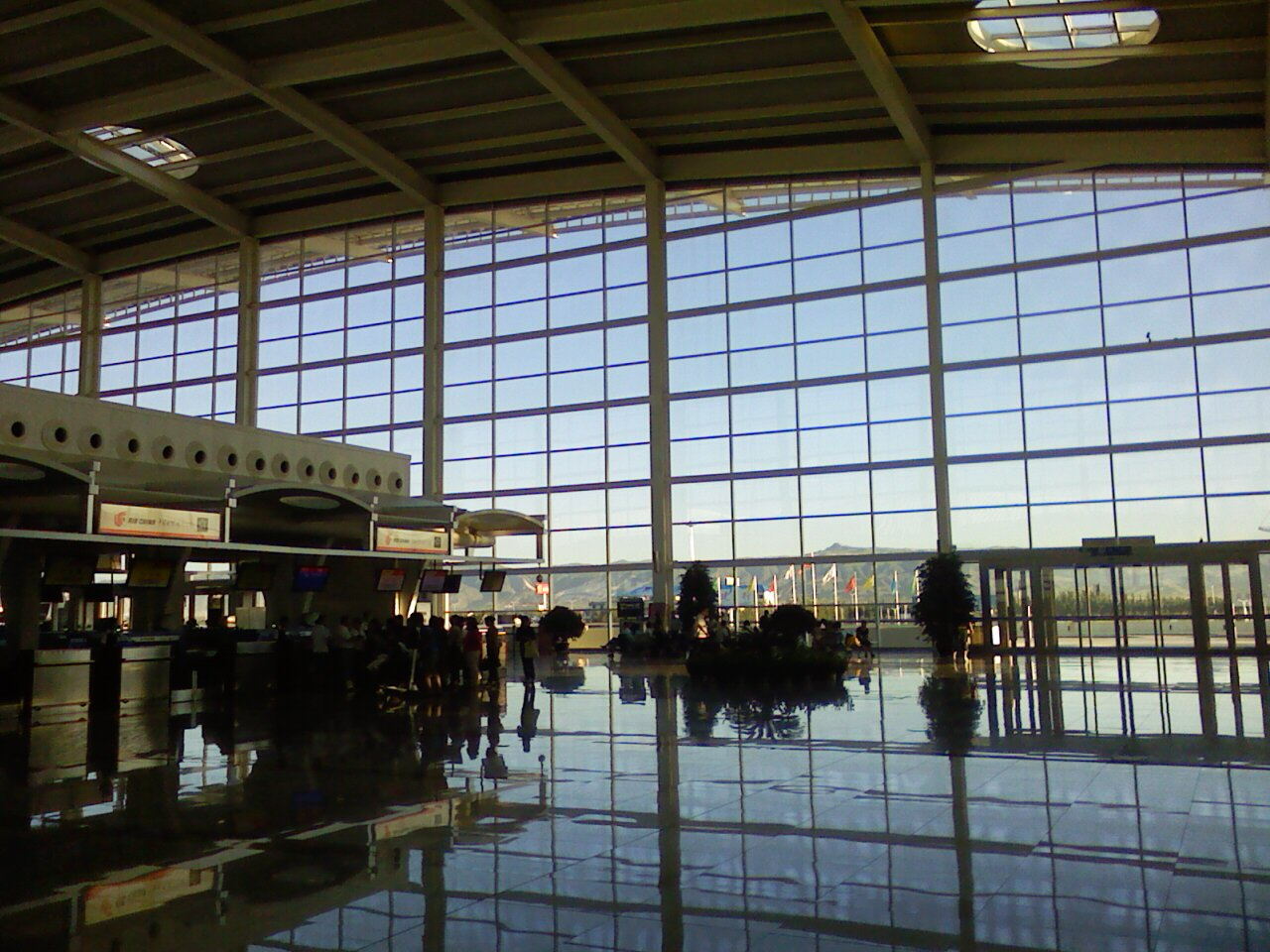
- Airport interior, 2008
- IATA: HET; ICAO: ZBHH

Summary
- Airport type: Public
- Serves: Hohhot
- Location: Saihan, Hohhot, Inner Mongolia, China
- Opened: 1 October 1958
- Closed: 26 November 2026
- Elevation AMSL: 1,084 m (3,556 ft)
- Coordinates: 40°51′05.12″N 111°49′26.77″E

Maps
- CAAC airport chart
- Location in Inner Mongolia Location in China

Runways
| Direction | Length | | Surface |
| Direction | m | ft | Surface |
|---|---|---|---|
| 08R/26L | 3,600 | 11,811 | Concrete |

Statistics (2025)
- Passengers: 12,722,692
- Aircraft movements: 111,576
- Cargo (metric tons): 60,227.8
- Source: List of the busiest airports in the People's Republic of China

Hohhot Baita International Airport

Chinese name
- Simplified Chinese: 呼和浩特白塔国际机场
- Traditional Chinese: 呼和浩特白塔國際機場
Transcriptions
Standard Mandarin
- Hanyu Pinyin: Hūhéhàotè Báitǎ Guójì Jīcháng
- Wade–Giles: Hu ho hao tʻo Pai tʻa Kuo chi chi chang

Mongolian name
- Mongolian Cyrillic: Хөххот олон улсын нисэх буудал
- Mongolian script: ᠬᠥᠬᠡᠬᠣᠲᠠ ᠣᠯᠠᠨ ᠤᠯᠤᠰ ᠦᠨ ᠨᠢᠰᠬᠦ ᠪᠠᠭᠤᠳᠠᠯ

Hohhot Baita International Airport (IATA: HET, ICAO: ZBHH) is an international airport serving Hohhot, the capital of Inner Mongolia, China. It is the largest airport in Inner Mongolia and lies 14.3 km (8.9 mi) east of downtown Hohhot. Its name Baita, meaning White Pagoda, derives from Wanbu Huayanjing Pagoda; one of the historical attractions in Hohhot which lies 5.6 km (3.5 mi) south-east of the airport. In 2025 it served 12,722,692 passengers.

== History ==
Hohhot Baita Airport was opened on 1 October 1958. When it first opened to air traffic, it had only one dirt runway, three single‑story buildings, and five tents. The taxiway and apron were simple, and the runway measured 1,500 meters in length and 100 meters in width.

In the mid-1980s and 1990s, it underwent two expansions and in June 2007 a new terminal was constructed. The new terminal covers an area of 54,499 square metres (586,620 sq ft) with 11 parking jetways and is capable of handling three million passengers each year. Its runway was also lengthened and its widened to accommodate jumbo jets such as the Airbus A380. It served as one of the diversion airports for air traffic during the 2008 Summer Olympics. With the expansion of Hohhot city, the airport is handled total of 13.15 million passengers in 2019, more than 4 times than normal capacity. It also serves as the main alternate airport for Beijing Capital Airport.

With the rapid expansion of the city, Baita Airport is now surrounded by urban area and has no more room to expand to accommodate growing traffic. The Hohhot Shengle International Airport is being constructed in Horinger County.

== Airlines and destinations ==
In 2025, Hohhot Baita International Airport plans to operate 139 routes, serving 92 cities in total, including 83 nonstop destinations and 6 international or regional cities.

=== Passenger ===
| Airlines | Destinations |
|---|---|
| 9 Air | Guangzhou, Zhengzhou |
| Aero Mongolia | Ulaanbaatar |
| Air China | Bayannur, Beijing–Capital, Changchun, Chengdu–Shuangliu, Chengdu–Tianfu, Chifeng, Chongqing, Guangzhou, Guiyang, Haikou, Hailar, Hangzhou, Manzhouli, Shanghai–Pudong, Shenyang, Shijiazhuang, Tianjin, Tongliao, Ulaanbaatar, Ulanhot, Wuhan, Xi'an, Xilinhot, Yinchuan |
| Air Guilin | Guilin, Shiyan |
| Air Travel | Kunming, Nanjing, Wuxi |
| Beijing Capital Airlines | Haikou, Hefei, Sanya, Zhengzhou |
| Chengdu Airlines | Chengdu–Shuangliu, Chengdu–Tianfu, Hailar, Nanjing, Qingdao, Shijiazhuang, Tongliao, Vladivostok, Wenzhou, Xilinhot, Zhengzhou |
| China Eastern Airlines | Changchun, Hefei, Huai'an, Kunming, Lanzhou, Nanchang, Nanjing, Qingdao, Shanghai–Hongqiao, Shanghai–Pudong, Wuhai, Xi'an, Yantai, Yinchuan |
| China Express Airlines | Alxa Left Banner, Arxan, Bayannur, Changzhi, Chengdu–Tianfu, Chifeng, Chongqing, Erenhot, Guiyang, Haikou, Hailar, Hangzhou, Jinan, Luoyang, Manzhouli, Ordos, Tongliao, Ulanhot, Xilinhot, Yan'an |
| China Southern Airlines | Changchun, Changsha, Guangzhou, Jieyang, Qingdao, Sanya, Shenzhen, Ürümqi, Wuhan, Zhengzhou |
| Chongqing Airlines | Chongqing, Tongliao |
| Donghai Airlines | Nantong, Zhengzhou, Zhuhai |
| Fuzhou Airlines | Harbin, Zhengzhou |
| Greater Bay Airlines | Hong Kong |
| Genghis Khan Airlines | Chifeng, Erenhot, Hailar, Tongliao, Manzhouli, Ulanhot, Wuhai, Xilinhot, Zhalantun |
| GX Airlines | Harbin, Jining, Nanning, Xiangyang |
| Hainan Airlines | Guangzhou, Guiyang, Haikou, Harbin, Nanchang, Nanjing, Sanya, Shenzhen, Ürümqi, Xuzhou, Zhengzhou |
| Hebei Airlines | Hangzhou, Shijiazhuang, Xiamen |
| Juneyao Air | Shanghai–Pudong, Wuhan |
| LJ Air | Harbin, Linfen, Shenzhen |
| Loong Air | Guangzhou, Hailar |
| Lucky Air | Kunming |
| MIAT Mongolian Airlines | Ulaanbaatar |
| Qingdao Airlines | Changsha, Hailar |
| Ruili Airlines | Holingol, Shenyang, Xi'an |
| Shandong Airlines | Changzhou, Chongqing, Jinan, Nanjing, Qingdao, Xiamen |
| Shanghai Airlines | Hailar, Shanghai–Hongqiao |
| Shenzhen Airlines | Shenzhen |
| Sichuan Airlines | Chengdu–Shuangliu |
| Spring Airlines | Changchun, Dalian, Harbin, Lanzhou, Shenyang, Shijiazhuang |
| Suparna Airlines | Hailar, Shenzhen |
| Tianjin Airlines | Chifeng, Chongqing, Dalian, Guiyang, Haikou, Hailar, Harbin, Tianjin, Tongliao, Ulanhot, Wuhai, Xi'an, Xilinhot, Zhengzhou |
| West Air | Hefei, Zhengzhou |
| XiamenAir | Changsha, Fuzhou, Hangzhou, Quanzhou, Shanghai–Hongqiao, Wuhan, Xiamen, Yuncheng, Zhengzhou |

=== Cargo ===
In 2025, Hohhot Baita International Airport handled 60,200 tons of cargo and mail, surpassing the 60,000‑ton mark for the first time, an annual increase of 1.8%. In December alone, throughput reached 7,977 tons, setting a new historical record. Over the year, the airport transported 6,181 tons of fresh meat products, accounting for 10% of total cargo volume, while cold‑chain veterinary pharmaceuticals reached 570 tons, a 30% increase from the previous year.

| Airlines | Destinations |
|---|---|
| China Postal Airlines | Nanjing, Taiyuan, Zhengzhou |
| SF Airlines | Hangzhou |

== Transport ==
It is served by Bayan (Airport) station on Line 1 of Hohhot Metro.

== See also ==
- List of airports in China
