= Loong Air =

Chinese airline

Loong Air 长龙航空

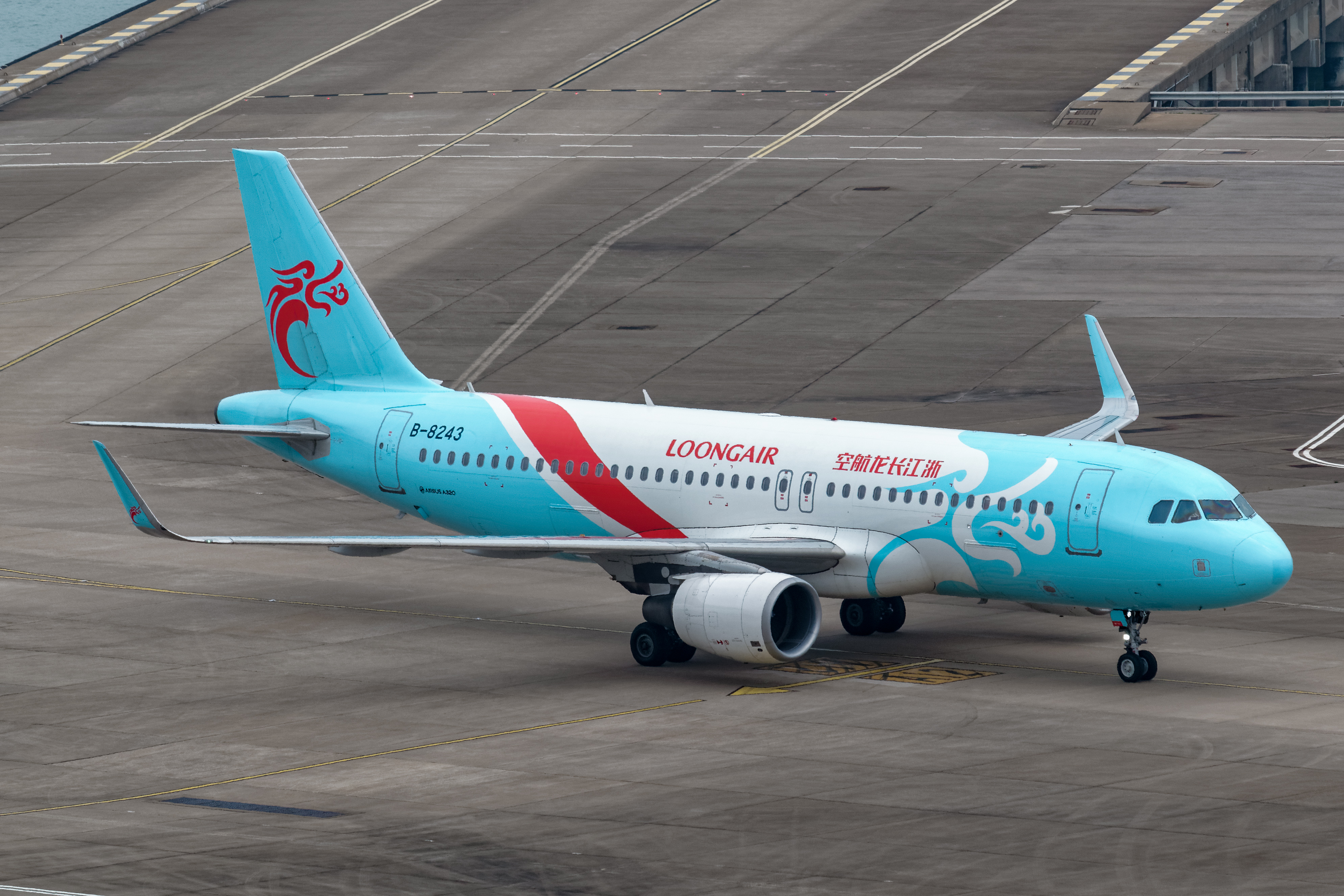
- Loong Air Airbus A320
IATA	ICAO	Call sign
GJ	CDC	LOONG AIR
- Founded: 2012; 14 years ago
- Commenced operations: 2012; 14 years ago (cargo); 29 December 2013; 12 years ago (passenger)
- Operating bases: Hangzhou Xiaoshan International Airport
- Fleet size: 73
- Destinations: 97
- Headquarters: Hangzhou Xiaoshan International Airport, Xiaoshan District, Hangzhou, Zhejiang, China
- Key people: Liu Yi (president); Liu Qihong (刘启宏) (chairman)
- Website: LoongAir.cn

Loong Air
- Simplified Chinese: 长龙航空
- Traditional Chinese: 長龍航空
Transcriptions
Standard Mandarin
- Hanyu Pinyin: Chánglóng Hángkōng

Zhejiang Loong Airlines Co. Ltd
- Simplified Chinese: 浙江长龙航空公司
- Traditional Chinese: 浙江長龍航空公司
Transcriptions
Standard Mandarin
- Hanyu Pinyin: Zhèjiāng Chánglóng Hángkōng gōngsī

CDI Cargo
- Simplified Chinese: 长龙国际货运航空公司
- Traditional Chinese: 長龍國際貨運航空公司
Transcriptions
Standard Mandarin
- Hanyu Pinyin: Chánglóng Guójì huòyùn gōngsī

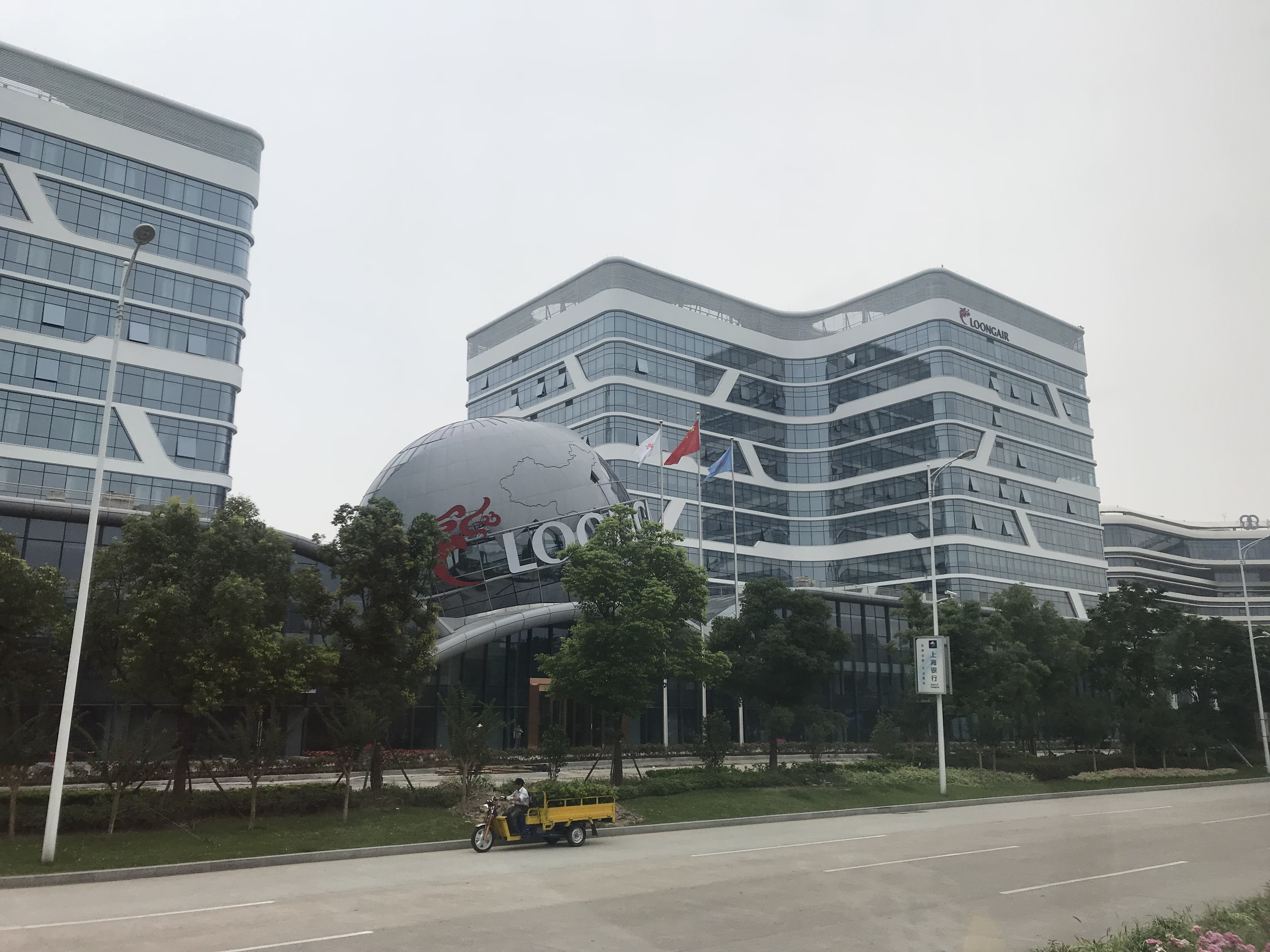
Headquarters in Hangzhou

Zhejiang Changlong Airlines Co. Ltd (Chinese: 浙江长龙航空公司), branded as Loong Air (长龙航空) and previously as CDI Cargo (长龙国际货运航空公司), is a Chinese airline based in Hangzhou Xiaoshan International Airport in Hangzhou, Zhejiang.

== History ==
Loong Airlines was originally a cargo airline named CDI Cargo Airlines, which started services in 2012 with one Boeing 737-300F freighter. It was approved to become a passenger airline by the Civil Aviation Administration of China and started domestic services in 2013. On 25 September 2013, the airline signed a memorandum of understanding with Airbus for the purchase of 20 Airbus A320 twin-engined aircraft. Its first flight was on 29 December 2013 from Hangzhou to Chongqing and Hangzhou to Shenzhen.

== Destinations ==
Country	City	Airport	Notes	Refs
Bangladesh	Dhaka	Hazrat Shahjalal International Airport	Cargo charter	
Cambodia	Sihanoukville	Sihanouk International Airport	Passenger	
China	Beijing	Beijing Capital International Airport	Passenger + cargo	
China	Bijie	Bijie Feixiong Airport	Passenger	
China	Chengdu	Chengdu Shuangliu International Airport	Passenger	
China	Chengdu	Chengdu Tianfu International Airport	Passenger	
China	Chongqing	Chongqing Jiangbei International Airport	Passenger	
China	Chifeng	Chifeng Yulong Airport	Passenger	
China	Dalian	Dalian Zhoushuizi International Airport	Passenger + cargo	
China	Guangzhou	Guangzhou Baiyun International Airport	Passenger + cargo	
China	Guiyang	Guiyang Longdongbao International Airport	Passenger	
China	Haikou	Haikou Meilan International Airport	Passenger	
China	Hangzhou	Hangzhou Xiaoshan International Airport	Hub	
China	Harbin	Harbin Taiping International Airport	Passenger	
China	Kunming	Kunming Changshui International Airport	Passenger + cargo	
China	Lijiang	Lijiang Sanyi International Airport	Passenger	
China	Linyi	Linyi Qiyang International Airport	Passenger	
China	Luoyang	Luoyang Beijiao Airport	Passenger	
China	Nanning	Nanning Wuxu International Airport	Passenger	
China	Nantong	Nantong Xingdong International Airport	Cargo	
China	Shenzhen	Shenzhen Bao'an International Airport	Passenger + cargo	
China	Tongliao	Tongliao Airport	Passenger	
China	Wanzhou	Wanzhou Wuqiao Airport	Passenger	
China	Xi'an	Xi'an Xianyang International Airport	Passenger	
China	Xiangyang	Xiangyang Liuji Airport	Passenger	
China	Yinchuan	Yinchuan Hedong International Airport	Passenger	
China	Zhengzhou	Zhengzhou Xinzheng International Airport	Passenger	
Hong Kong	Hong Kong	Hong Kong International Airport	Passenger	
Indonesia	Jakarta	Soekarno–Hatta International Airport	Passenger	
Japan	Fukuoka	Fukuoka Airport	Passenger	
Japan	Osaka	Kansai International Airport	Passenger	
Japan	Tokyo	Narita International Airport	Passenger	
Kazakhstan	Almaty	Almaty International Airport	Passenger	
Kyrgyzstan	Bishkek	Manas International Airport	Passenger	
Malaysia	Kota Kinabalu	Kota Kinabalu International Airport	Terminated	
Malaysia	Kuala Lumpur	Kuala Lumpur International Airport	Passenger	
Malaysia	Penang	Penang International Airport	Passenger	
Myanmar	Mandalay	Mandalay International Airport	Passenger	
Philippines	Kalibo	Kalibo International Airport	Terminated	
Singapore	Singapore	Changi Airport	Passenger	
South Korea	Jeju	Jeju International Airport	Passenger	
South Korea	Muan	Muan International Airport	Passenger	
South Korea	Yangyang	Yangyang International Airport	Seasonal	
Thailand	Bangkok	Suvarnabhumi Airport	Passenger	
Thailand	Pattaya	U-Tapao International Airport	Terminated	
Uzbekistan	Samarqand	Samarqand International Airport	Passenger	
Uzbekistan	Tashkent	Tashkent International Airport	Seasonal	
Vietnam	Da Nang	Da Nang International Airport	Charter	
Vietnam	Nha Trang	Cam Ranh International Airport	Charter	

=== Codeshare partners ===
Loong Air has codeshare agreements with the following airlines:

- Chengdu Airlines
- China Eastern Airlines
- China Express Airlines
- China Southern Airlines
- Hainan Airlines
- Sichuan Airlines
- Tibet Airlines
- XiamenAir

=== Interline agreements ===
Loong Air has interline agreements with the following airlines:

- Emirates

== Fleet ==
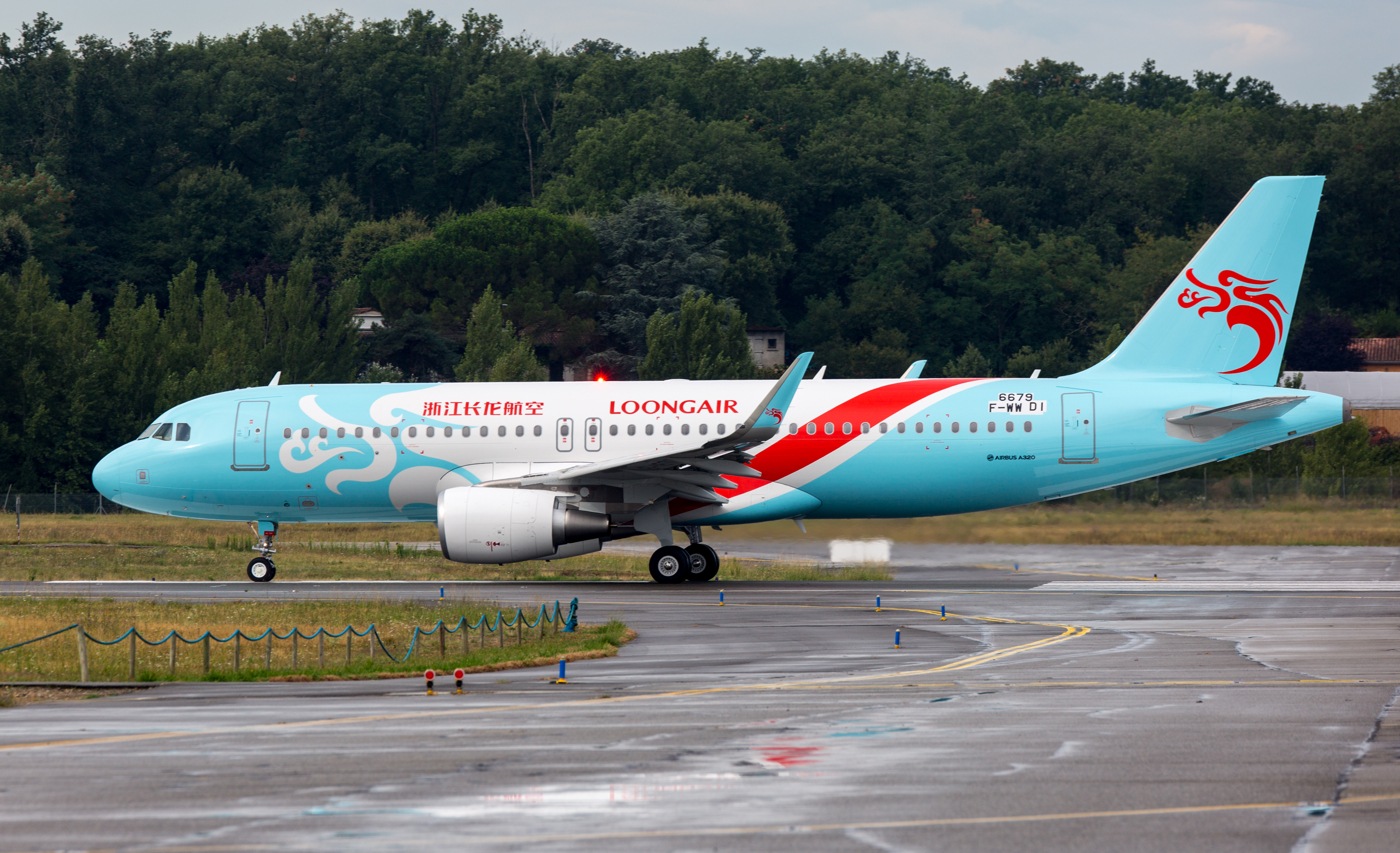
Airbus A320 with Loong Air livery at Toulouse-Blagnac airport

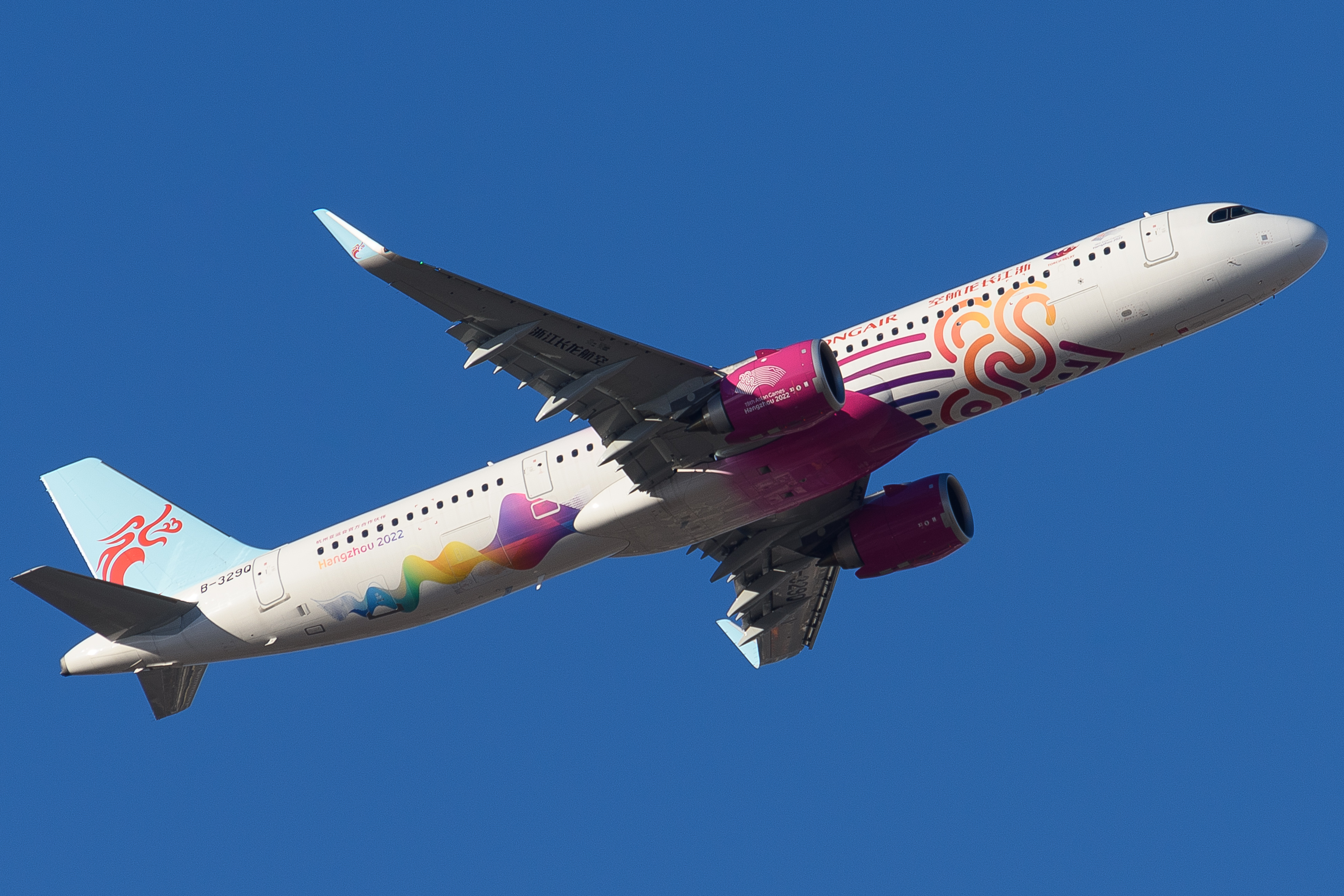
Airbus A321neo with 2022 Asian Games promotional livery

As of November 2025, Loong Air operates an all-Airbus A320 family fleet composed of the following aircraft:

Aircraft	In service	Orders	Passengers			Notes
Aircraft	In service	Orders	W	Y	Total	Notes
Airbus A319-100	1	—	8	126	134	
Airbus A320-200	27	—	—	174	174	
Airbus A320neo	33	3	—	174	174	
Airbus A320neo	1	3	—	186	186	
Airbus A321neo	2	—	16	184	200	
Airbus A321neo	10	—	8	202	210	
Total	74	3				

* The airline has an MoU with Airbus for the purchase of 11 Airbus A320ceo and 9 Airbus A320neo aircraft.

** The airline has a letter of intent with Airbus for the purchase of 20 Airbus A220 aircraft (previously Bombardier CSeries).

== See also ==
- Transportation in China
