= Tongliao Airport =

Tongliao Airport 通辽机场
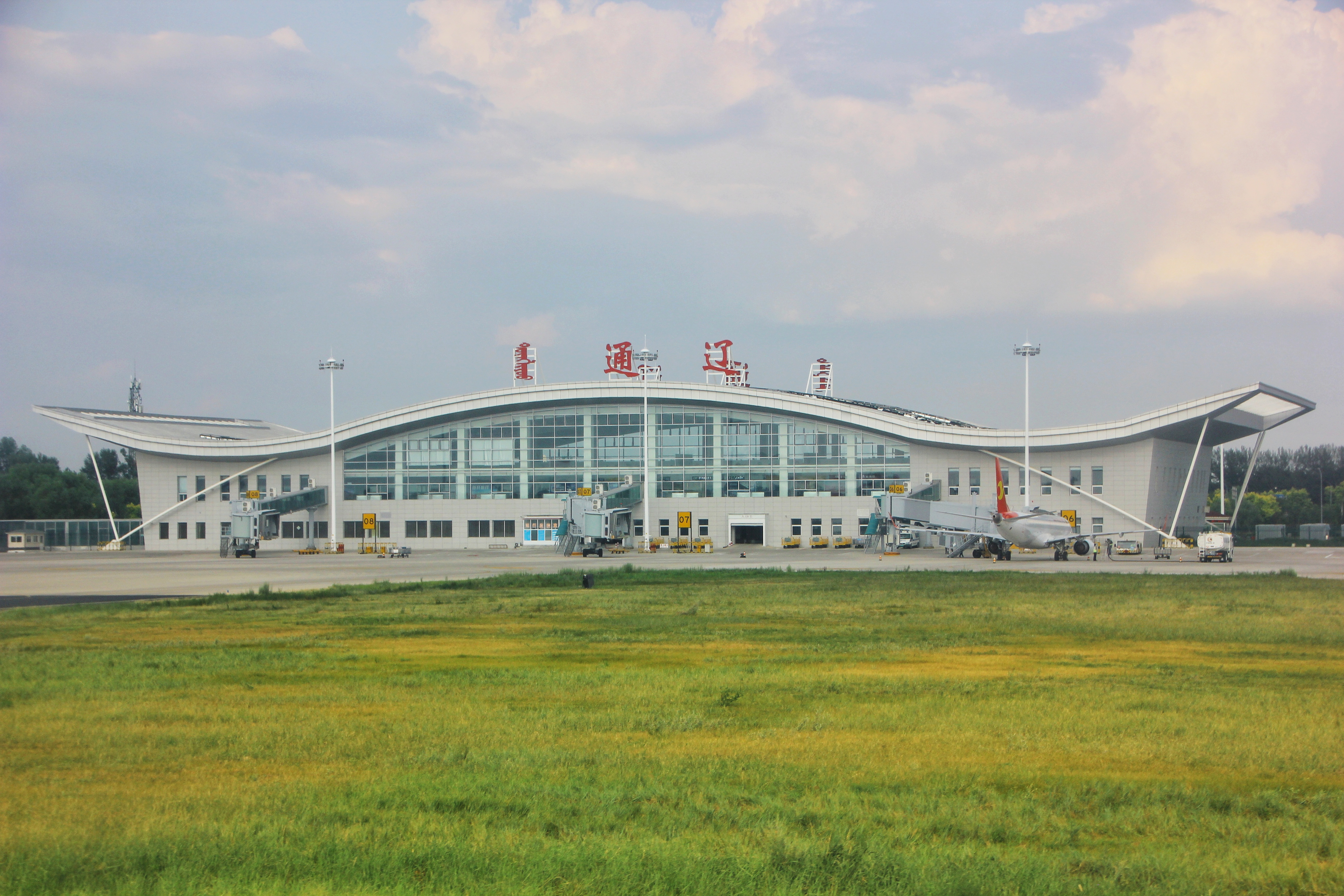
- IATA: TGO; ICAO: ZBTL

Summary
- Airport type: Public
- Serves: Tongliao, Inner Mongolia
- Location: Horqin District, Tongliao
- Elevation AMSL: 183 m / 600 ft
- Coordinates: 43°33′24.96″N 122°11′59.22″E

Map
- Location of airport in Inner Mongolia

Runways
Direction	Length		Surface
Direction	m	ft	Surface
02/20	2,300	7,546	Concrete

Statistics (2025)
- Passengers: 1,356,501
- Aircraft movements: 16,641
- Cargo (metric tons): 1,940.5
- Source: CAAC

Tongliao Airport
- Simplified Chinese: 通辽机场
- Traditional Chinese: 通遼機場
Transcriptions
Standard Mandarin
- Hanyu Pinyin: Tongliao Jīchǎng

Tongliao Airport (IATA: TGO, ICAO: ZBTL) is an airport in Tongliao, Inner Mongolia, People's Republic of China.

== History ==
On August 5, 1958, the Tongliao Civil Aviation Station was established under the urging of the Beijing Civil Aviation Administration Bureau and the Transportation Department of the Inner Mongolia Autonomous Region. On August 24, with the day and night efforts of 100,000 migrant workers, citizens, employees and students, the first runway of Tongliao Airport, a 1,200-meter-long and 60-meter-wide dirt runway, was officially completed.

On April 1, 1959, the Li-2 aircraft made a test flight at Tongliao Airport, and the test flight was successful. On May 26, 1959, Tongliao Airport's first route, Hohhot-Beijing-Chifeng-Tongliao round-trip route, was officially opened. In 1960, the first-generation terminal building of Tongliao Airport was completed and put into use.

From 1987 to 1995, Tongliao Airport underwent three large-scale renovations and expansions. The earth runway was changed to a cement runway, the length was extended from 1,200 meters to 1,800 meters, and a second-generation terminal building with an area of 2,940 square meters was built. The terminal building currently used for cargo and restaurant functions at Tongliao Airport was built at that time. After three reconstructions and expansions, Tongliao Airport has begun to take shape.

In 2006, the second-generation terminal of Tongliao Airport implemented a full-process transformation, adding a VIP lounge, and the airport began to have non-aeronautical services.

On August 10, 2009, the third flight area expansion project of Tongliao Airport officially started. The total investment of the project is 111.537 million yuan. The 2,300×45m runway and contact road were covered with asphalt concrete, and a vertical contact road and 17,120 square meters of station apron were built. The original station apron was capped with concrete; the power supply and navigation lighting facilities were updated, and the navigation, meteorological, and supporting facilities such as fire protection, patrol roads, and fences have been renovated, raising the level of the airport's flight area from 3C to 4C, meeting the take-off and landing conditions for Class C aircraft such as B737-800, and providing a strong hardware guarantee for further adapting to regional economic development and the rapid development of various airport undertakings.

In 2012, the passenger throughput was 300,000 and the cargo throughput was 700 tons. In 2015, the passenger throughput was 800,000 and the cargo throughput was 1,200 tons, an increase of 2.67 times and 1.71 times respectively.

In 2020, the largest reconstruction and expansion project since the establishment of Tongliao Airport was fully completed and put into operation, and the airport runway was extended from 2,300 meters to 2,700 meters.

== Airlines and destinations ==
Airlines	Destinations
Air Chang'an	Hailar, Xi'an
Air China	Beijing–Capital, Beijing–Daxing, Hohhot
Chengdu Airlines	Hohhot
China Express Airlines	Alxa Left Banner, Baotou, Chongqing, Hailar, Hohhot, Ordos
Chongqing Airlines	Chongqing, Hohhot
Genghis Khan Airlines	Baotou, Erenhot, Hailar, Hohhot, Ordos, Ulanhot
Spring Airlines	Shanghai–Pudong, Shenzhen, Shijiazhuang
Tianjin Airlines	Bayannur, Hailar, Hohhot, Jinan, Manzhouli, Tianjin, Ulanqab, Wuhai, Wuhan, Xilinhot

== See also ==
- List of airports in China
