= Bayannur Tianjitai Airport =

Airport in Inner Mongolia, People's Republic of China

Bayannur Tianjitai Airport 巴彦淖尔天吉泰机场
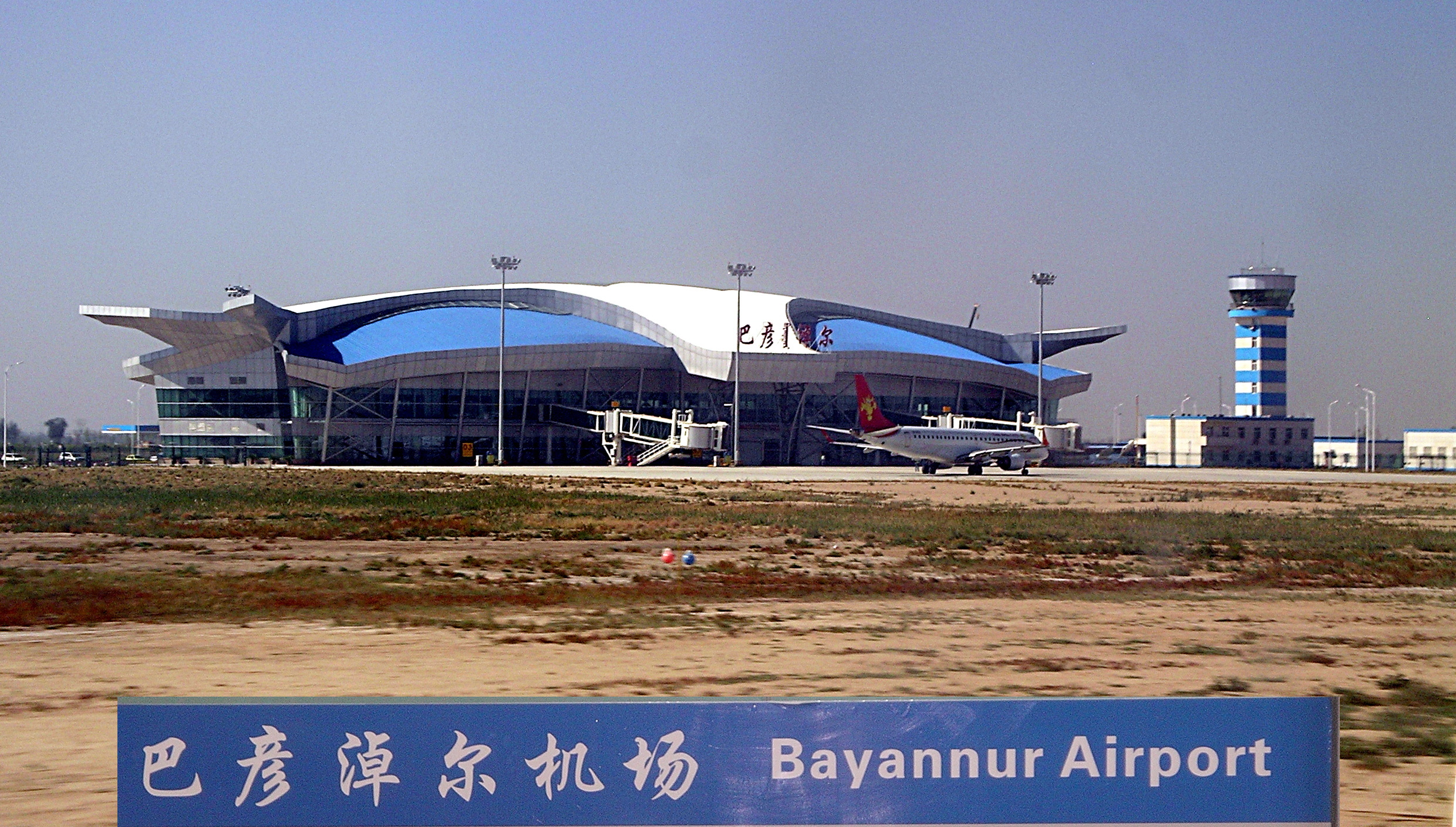
- IATA: RLK; ICAO: ZBYZ

Summary
- Airport type: Public
- Serves: Bayannur, Inner Mongolia, China
- Location: Tianjitai, Wuyuan County
- Elevation AMSL: 3,396 ft (1,035 m)
- Coordinates: 40°55′35″N 107°44′20″E

Map
- Location of airport in Inner Mongolia

Runways
| Direction | Length | | Surface |
| Direction | m | ft | Surface |
|---|---|---|---|
| 11/29 | 2,600 | 8,530 | Concrete |

Statistics (2025)
- Passengers: 367,154
- Aircraft movements: 4,645
- Cargo (metric tons): 634.9

Bayannur Tianjitai Airport
- Simplified Chinese: 巴彦淖尔天吉泰机场
- Traditional Chinese: 巴彥淖爾天吉泰機場
Transcriptions
Standard Mandarin
- Hanyu Pinyin: Bāyànnào'ěr Tiānjítài Jīchǎng

Bayannaoer Tianjitai Airport (IATA: RLK, ICAO: ZBYZ) is an airport serving the city of Bayannur in Inner Mongolia Autonomous Region, China. It is located in the town of Tianjitai in Wuyuan County, 33 kilometers from the city center. Construction began on 26 January 2010 with a total investment of 360 million yuan, and the airport was opened on 30 December 2011.

== History ==
In October 2009, the National Development and Reform Commission approved the feasibility study report for the Bayannur Civil Airport in Inner Mongolia.

Construction of Bayannur Tianjitai Airport began on January 26, 2010. The airport was positioned as a domestic feeder airport. It was designed to handle 230,000 passengers and 810 tons of cargo by 2020. The airport was designed as a 4C-level airport, capable of accommodating Boeing 737-800 and Airbus A320.

In September 2011, the airport completed its flight calibration and was ready for trial flights. On November 1, 2011, a Boeing 737-800 aircraft landed on the runway, marking the successful test flight of Bayannur Tianjitai Airport.

From November 1st to 3rd, 2011, the Civil Aviation Administration of North China organized an industry acceptance inspection at Bayannur Tianjitai Airport. The industry acceptance inspection for the new airport project was completed on November 3rd, 2011. The airport officially opened for operation on December 30, 2011.

On March 26, 2019, the expansion plan for the apron and connecting taxiway at Bayannur Tianjitai Airport was approved by the Civil Aviation Administration of Inner Mongolia. On April 2, 2019, the project officially started. On November 27, 2019, the expansion project passed the final acceptance inspection.

In November 2021, soil compaction tests revealed that the airport runway did not meet industry standards. Despite numerous compaction operations and other measures, the problem persists. The airport was closed for emergency repairs starting September 20, 2022. On October 27, 2022, the repair was completed and passed inspection. On October 30, the airport reopened for use.

== Facilities ==
The airport has a runway that is 2,600 meters long and 45 meters wide (class 4C), a 7,076-square-meter terminal building with 2 aerobridges, and three aircraft parking bays. It is designed to handle 230,000 passengers and 810 tons of cargo annually by 2020.

== Airlines and destinations ==
The airport is served by the following airlines:

| Airlines | Destinations |
|---|---|
| Air China | Beijing–Capital, Beijing–Daxing, Hohhot |
| China Express Airlines | Chengdu–Tianfu, Hohhot |
| China Southern Airlines | Guangzhou, Zhengzhou |
| Juneyao Air | Shanghai–Pudong, Zhengzhou |
| Tianjin Airlines | Tongliao, Xilinhot |

== See also ==
- List of airports in China
- List of the busiest airports in China
