= Tian Jiao Airlines =

Chinese airline

Tian Jiao Airlines 天骄航空
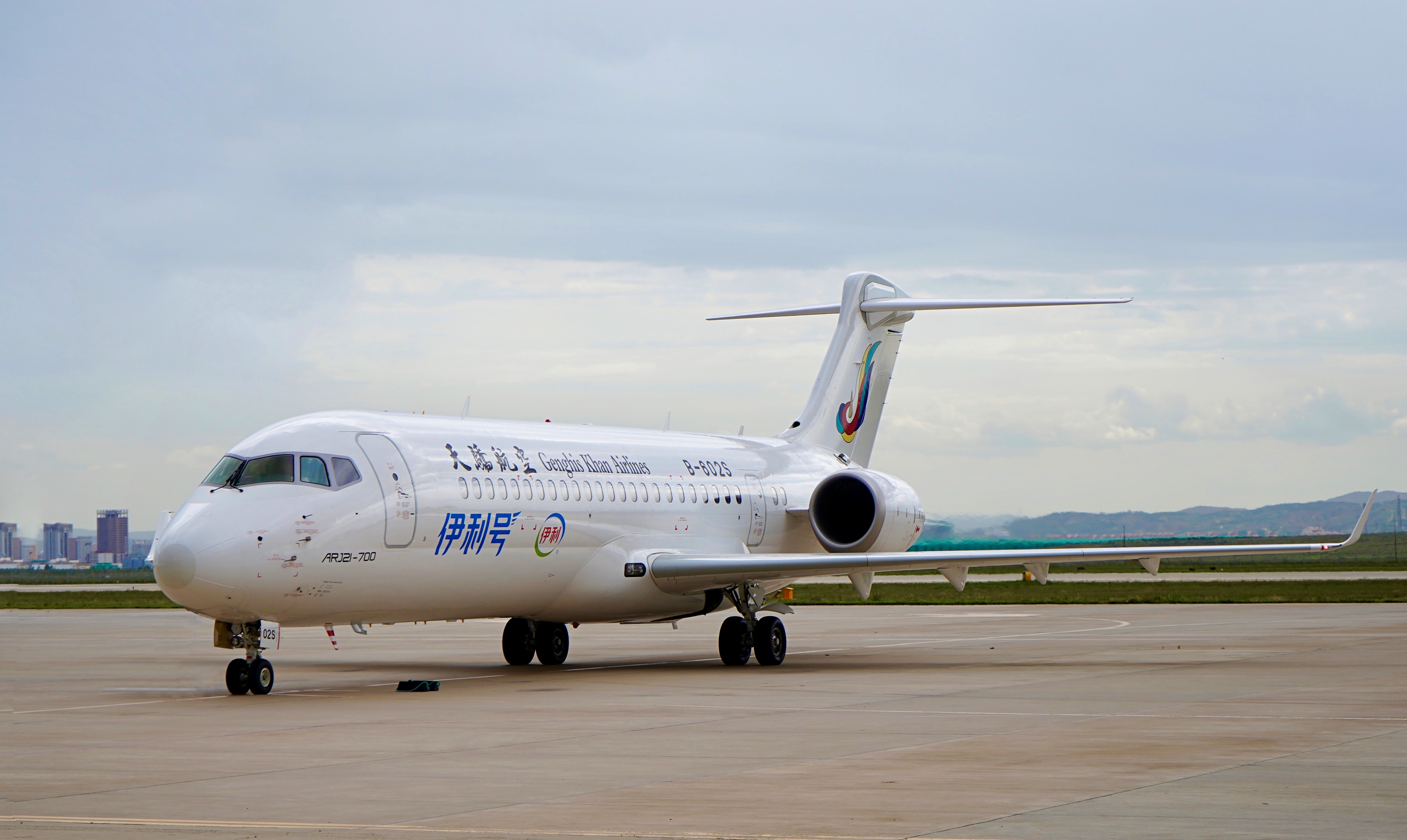
- Tian Jiao Airlines Comac ARJ21-700
IATA	ICAO	Call sign
9D	NMG	TIANJIAO AIR
- Founded: 11 January 2017; 9 years ago
- Commenced operations: 27 July 2019; 7 years ago
- Hubs: Hohhot Baita International Airport
- Fleet size: 9
- Destinations: 12
- Key people: Hao Yu Tao

Tian Jiao Airlines (Chinese: 天骄航空; pinyin: Tiānjiāo hángkōng), previously known as Genghis Khan Airlines, is an airline headquartered at Hohhot Baita International Airport in Hohhot, the capital of Inner Mongolia, China.

== History ==
The airline was a venture of Inner Mongolia Communications Investment Group with support from the government of the Inner Mongolia Autonomous Region, China. On October 17, 2018, the airline launched as Tian Jiao Airlines and confirmed an order for 25 Comac C909 aircraft. The aircraft were scheduled for delivery in early 2019. The first aircraft was delivered on February 22, 2019. In April 2026 the airline rebranded back to its original name, Tian Jiao Airlines, because new management at the airline decided they wanted go back to its original operational identity as a part of a new corporate restructuring.

== Fleet ==
As of August 2025 Tian Jiao Airlines fleet consists of the following aircraft:

Tian Jiao Airliness fleet
Aircraft	In service	Orders	Passengers	Notes
Comac C909	9	16	90	
Total	7	18		
