= Wuhan Airlines =

Chinese airline

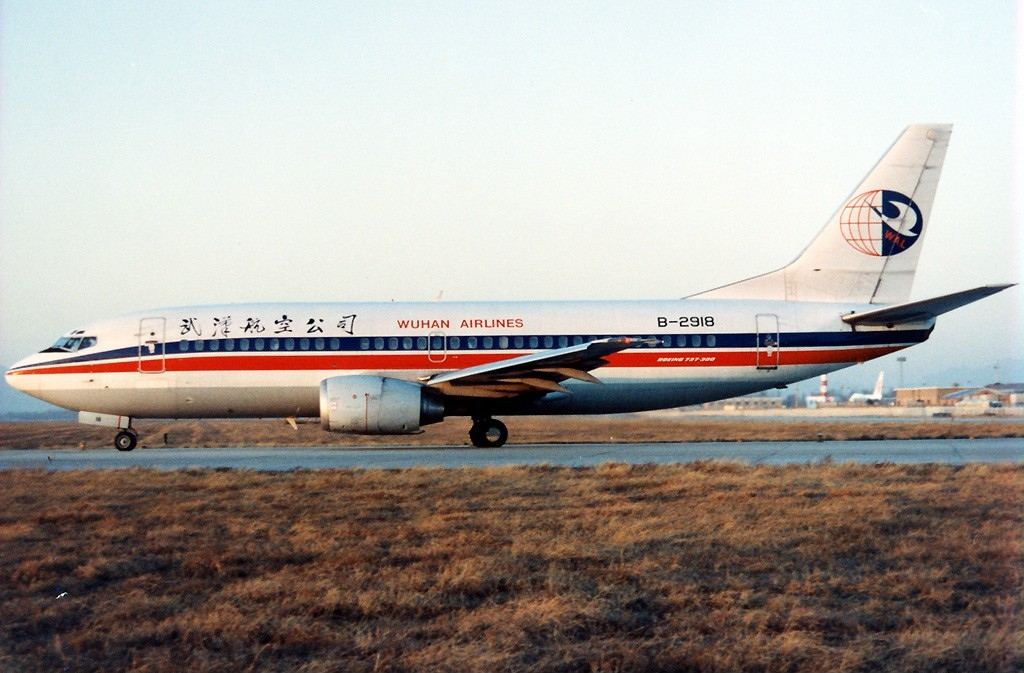
- Wuhan Airlines Boeing 737-300
IATA	ICAO	Call sign
WU	CWU	Wuhan Air
- Founded: May 1986
- Ceased operations: 18 August 2002 (merged into China Eastern Airlines)
- Hubs: Wuhan Tianhe International Airport
- Fleet size: 20
- Headquarters: Wuhan, People's Republic of China
- Key people: Ch Yaokun (Executive); Yin Y Wang (Director)
- Employees: 200 (1999)

Wuhan Airlines (S: 武汉航空, T: 武漢航空, P: Wǔhàn Hángkōng) was an airline based in Wuhan of the People's Republic of China. In 2003, it merged into China Eastern Airlines.

== History ==
Wuhan Airlines was established in May 1986 during a period of economic reforms in China. In September 1997, Wuhan Airlines (along with Hainan Airlines, Shandong Airlines, Shenzhen Airlines, Sichuan Airlines and Zhongyuan Airlines) formed the Xinxing Alliance, an airline alliance for Chinese provincial airlines. In 1999, Wuhan Airlines signed a contract for 2 Boeing 737-800 aircraft, intended to be delivered after 2001. Wuhan Airlines also intended to purchase 5 Boeing 717-200 aircraft.

In April 2001, Wuhan Airlines (along with China Postal Airlines, Shandong Airlines, Shanghai Airlines, Shenzhen Airlines, and Sichuan Airlines) formed the partnership "China Sky Aviation Enterprises", in order to protect themselves from being acquired by major airlines such as Air China, China Eastern Airlines, and China Southern Airlines, which had already absorbed several airlines at that point. In June 2001, the airline signed an agreement with Embraer to purchase the Embraer ERJ-145 aircraft.

In March 2002, China Eastern Airlines acquired a 40% stake of the airline. By August, Wuhan Airlines ceased to operate under its own name, and was integrated into China Eastern Airlines.

== Destinations ==
As of 1999, Wuhan Airlines served the following destinations (list may be incomplete):

Country	City	Airport	Notes
China	Beijing	Beijing Capital International Airport	
China	Chengdu	Chengdu Shuangliu International Airport	
China	Chongqing	Chongqing Jiangbei International Airport	
China	Dalian	Dalian Zhoushuizi International Airport	
China	Enshi	Enshi Xujiaping International Airport	
China	Guangzhou	Guangzhou Baiyun International Airport (1933–2004)	
China	Guiyang	Guiyang Longdongbao International Airport	
China	Hangzhou	Hangzhou Jianqiao Airport	
China	Hangzhou	Hangzhou Xiaoshan International Airport	
China	Kunming	Kunming Wujiaba International Airport	
China	Nanjing	Nanjing Dajiaochang Airport	
China	Nanjing	Nanjing Lukou International Airport	Airport closed
China	Ningbo	Ningbo Lishe International Airport	
China	Shanghai	Shanghai Hongqiao International Airport	
China	Shantou	Shantou Waisha Airport	
China	Shenyang	Shenyang Taoxian International Airport	
China	Shenzhen	Shenzhen Bao'an International Airport	
China	Taizhou	Taizhou Luqiao Airport	
China	Tianjin	Tianjin Binhai International Airport	
China	Wenzhou	Wenzhou Longwan International Airport	
China	Wuhan	Wuhan Tianhe International Airport	Hub
China	Wuhan	Wuhan Wangjiadun Airport	Airport closed
China	Xiamen	Xiamen Gaoqi International Airport	
China	Yiwu	Yiwu Airport	

=== Partner airlines ===
Wuhan Airlines had established partnerships with the following airlines:

- China Postal Airlines
- Hainan Airlines
- Shandong Airlines
- Shanghai Airlines
- Shenzhen Airlines
- Sichuan Airlines
- Zhongyuan Airlines

== Fleet ==
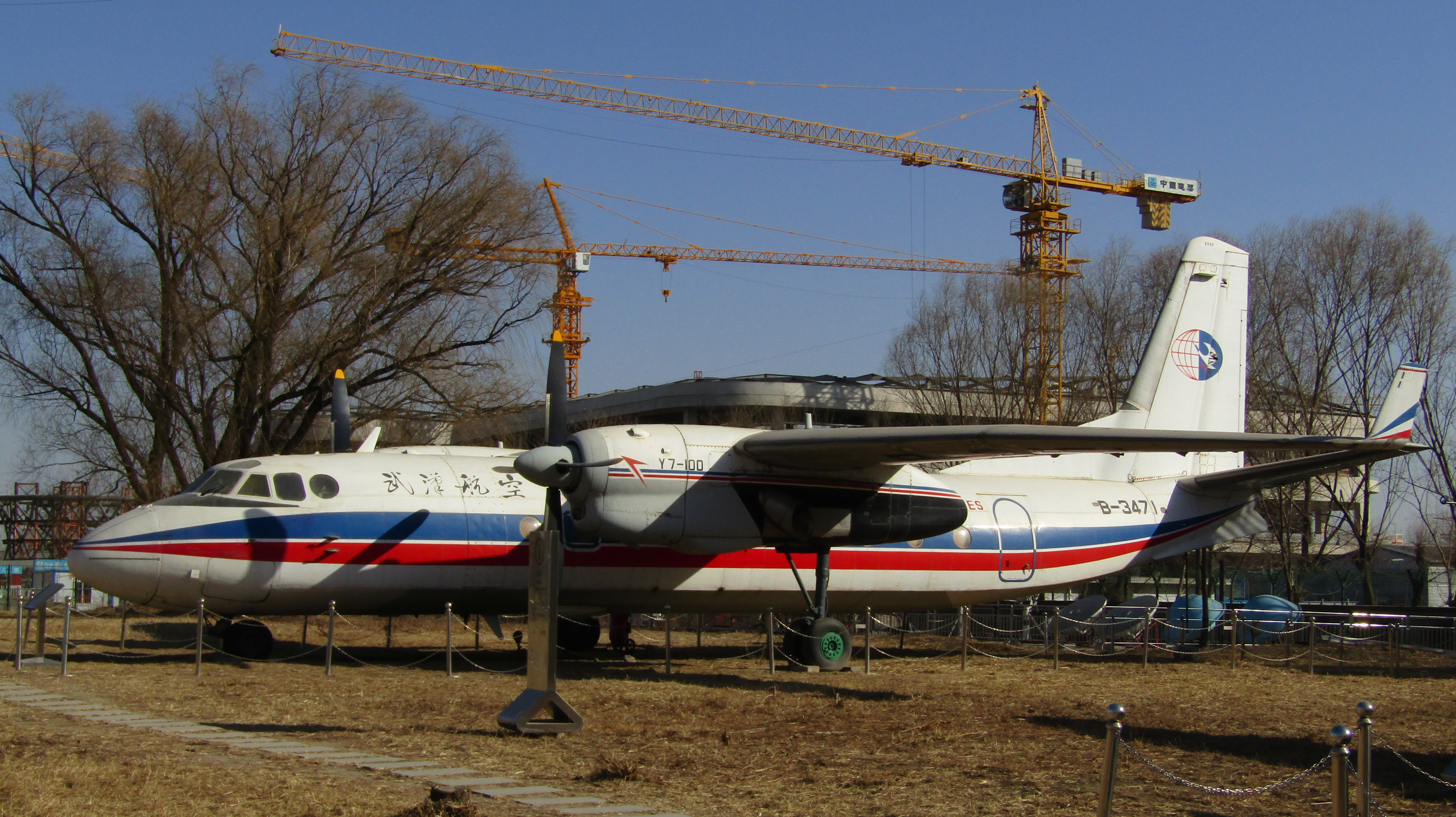
A Wuhan Airlines Xian Y-7-100 at Beijing Civil Aviation Museum

=== Fleet as of 2002 ===
Aircraft	In service	Orders	Notes
Boeing 717-200	—	5	
Boeing 737-300	6	—	
Boeing 737-800	2	—	
Embraer ERJ-145	—	5	
Xi'an MA60	3	—	
Xi'an Y-7	6	—	
Total	17	10	

=== Fleet history ===
- 4 Avia 14 (B-4211 crashed near Lanzhou on 8 October 1992)

== Accidents and incidents ==
- On October 8, 1992, Wuhan Airlines Flight 4211, a flight from Lanzhou to X'ian crashed into a hill while returning to Lanzhou due to an engine failure for unknown reasons, killing 14 of the 35 onboard (5 crew members and 9 passengers).
- On June 22, 2000, Wuhan Airlines Flight 343 from Enshi to Wuhan was forced to circle for 30 minutes due to thunderstorms. The aircraft eventually crashed on the banks of Han River in Hanyang District, all on-board perished, though there were varying accounts of number of crew and passengers. In addition, the crash also killed 7 people on the ground.
