= Zhongyuan Airlines =

Airline of China (1986–2000)

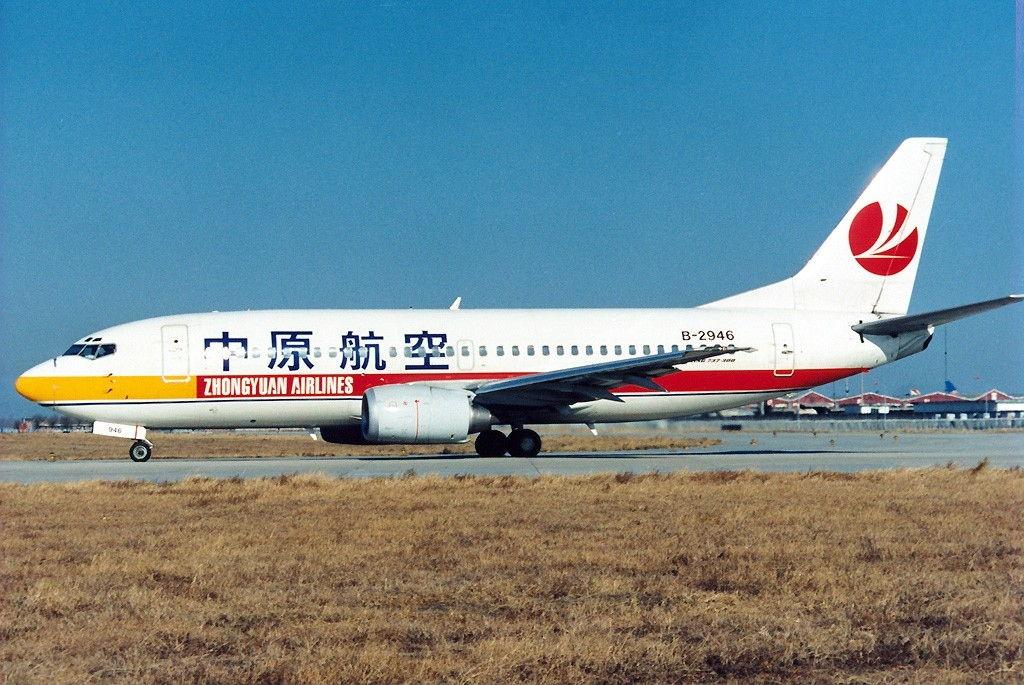
- Zhongyuan Airlines Boeing 737-300 in 1995
| IATA | ICAO | Call sign |
|---|---|---|
| Z2 | CYN | ZHONGYUAN |
- Founded: 14 May 1986
- Ceased operations: 4 August 2000 (acquired by China Southern Airlines)
- Hubs: Zhengzhou–Dongjiao (1986–1997); Zhengzhou–Xinzheng (1997–2000)
- Fleet size: 7
- Destinations: 21 (1999)
- Headquarters: Zhengzhou, Henan, China
- Key people: Xie Yongliang (President); Rong Liang (General manager)
- Employees: 300 (1999)
- Website: Zhongyuan Airlines (Archive)

Zhongyuan Airlines (中原航空 Zhōngyuán Hángkōng) was an airline based in Zhengzhou, Henan, China. Its main base was Zhengzhou Xinzheng International Airport.

== History ==
Zhongyuan Airlines was established on 15 May 1986 as a regional airline serving China's Zhongyuan (central plains) region. By August 2000, the Civil Aviation Administration of China and Henan provincial government approved the acquisition of Zhongyuan Airlines by China Southern Airlines, increasing the airline's presence in the Henan province. It was acquired by China Southern Airlines on 4 August 2000.

== Destinations ==
As of 1999, Zhongyuan Airlines served the following destinations:

| Country | City | Airport | Notes |
|---|---|---|---|
| China | Beijing | Beijing Capital International Airport | |
| China | Changsha | Changsha Huanghua International Airport | |
| China | Chengdu | Chengdu Shuangliu International Airport | |
| China | Chongqing | Chongqing Jiangbei International Airport | |
| China | Guilin | Guilin Liangjiang International Airport | |
| China | Guilin | Guilin Qifengling Airport | Airport closed |
| China | Guiyang | Guiyang Longdongbao International Airport | |
| China | Haikou | Haikou Dayingshan Airport | Airport closed |
| China | Haikou | Haikou Meilan International Airport | |
| China | Harbin | Harbin Taiping International Airport | |
| China | Jingdezhen | Jingdezhen Luojia Airport | |
| China | Kunming | Kunming Wujiaba International Airport | |
| China | Nanjing | Nanjing Dajiaochang Airport | |
| China | Nanjing | Nanjing Lukou International Airport | Airport closed |
| China | Ningbo | Ningbo Lishe International Airport | |
| China | Shanghai | Shanghai Hongqiao International Airport | |
| China | Shenyang | Shenyang Taoxian International Airport | |
| China | Shenzhen | Shenzhen Bao'an International Airport | |
| China | Taizhou | Taizhou Luqiao Airport | |
| China | Wenzhou | Wenzhou Longwan International Airport | |
| China | Wuhan | Wuhan Tianhe International Airport | |
| China | Wuhan | Wuhan Wangjiadun Airport | Airport closed |
| China | Xiamen | Xiamen Gaoqi International Airport | |
| China | Yantai | Yantai Laishan Airport | |
| China | Zhengzhou | Zhengzhou Dongjiao Airport | Airport closed |
| China | Zhengzhou | Zhengzhou Xinzheng International Airport | Hub |

=== Partner airlines ===
Zhongyuan Airlines had established partnerships with the following airlines:

- Hainan Airlines
- Shandong Airlines
- Shenzhen Airlines
- Sichuan Airlines
- Wuhan Airlines

== Fleet ==
=== Final fleet ===
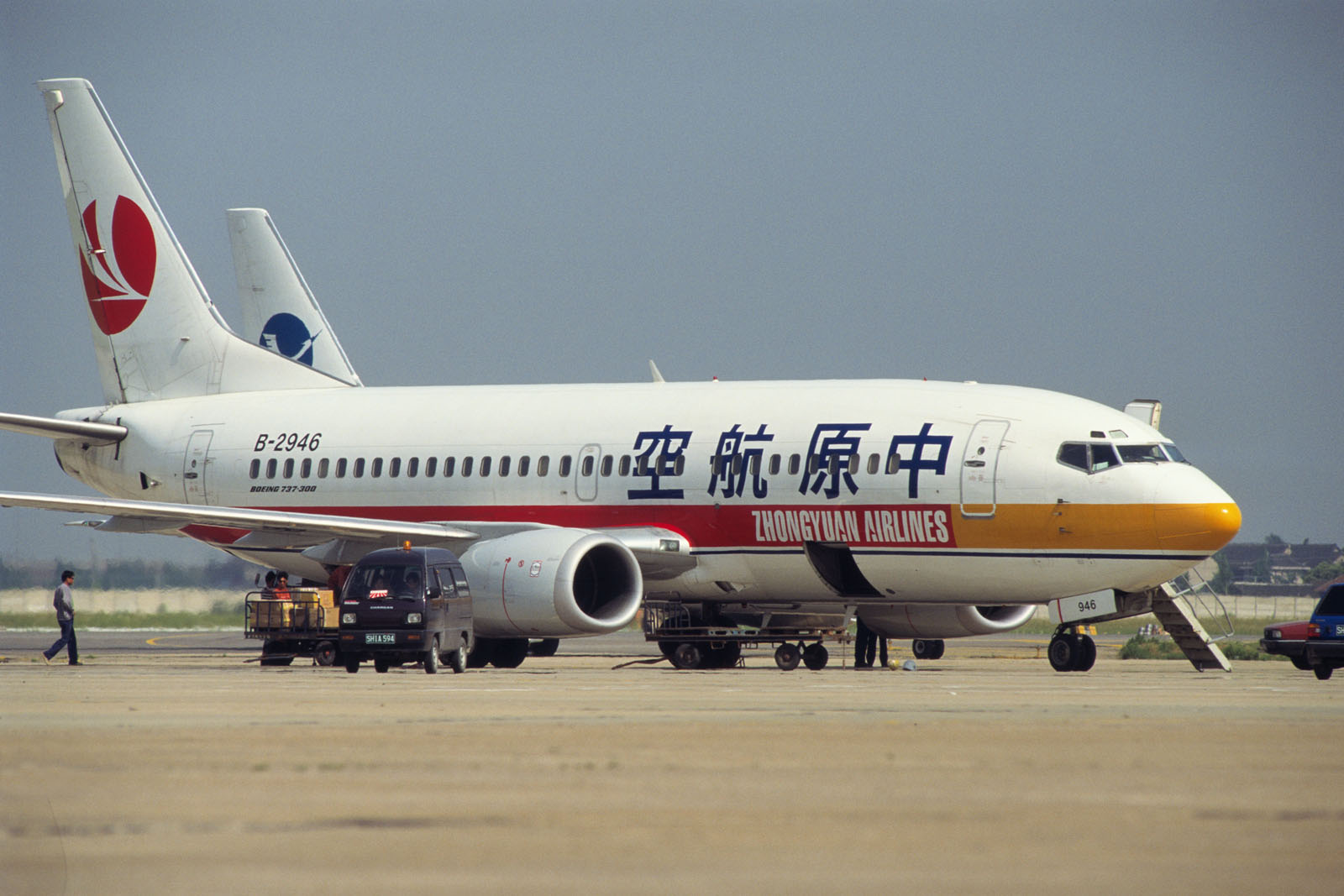
Boeing 737-300 of Zhongyuan Airlines.

At the time of merger, Zhongyuan Airlines fleet consisted of:

| Aircraft | In service | Orders | Notes |
|---|---|---|---|
| Boeing 737-300 | 5 | — | |
| Xi'an Y-7 | 2 | — | r |
| Total | 7 | — | |

=== Fleet history ===
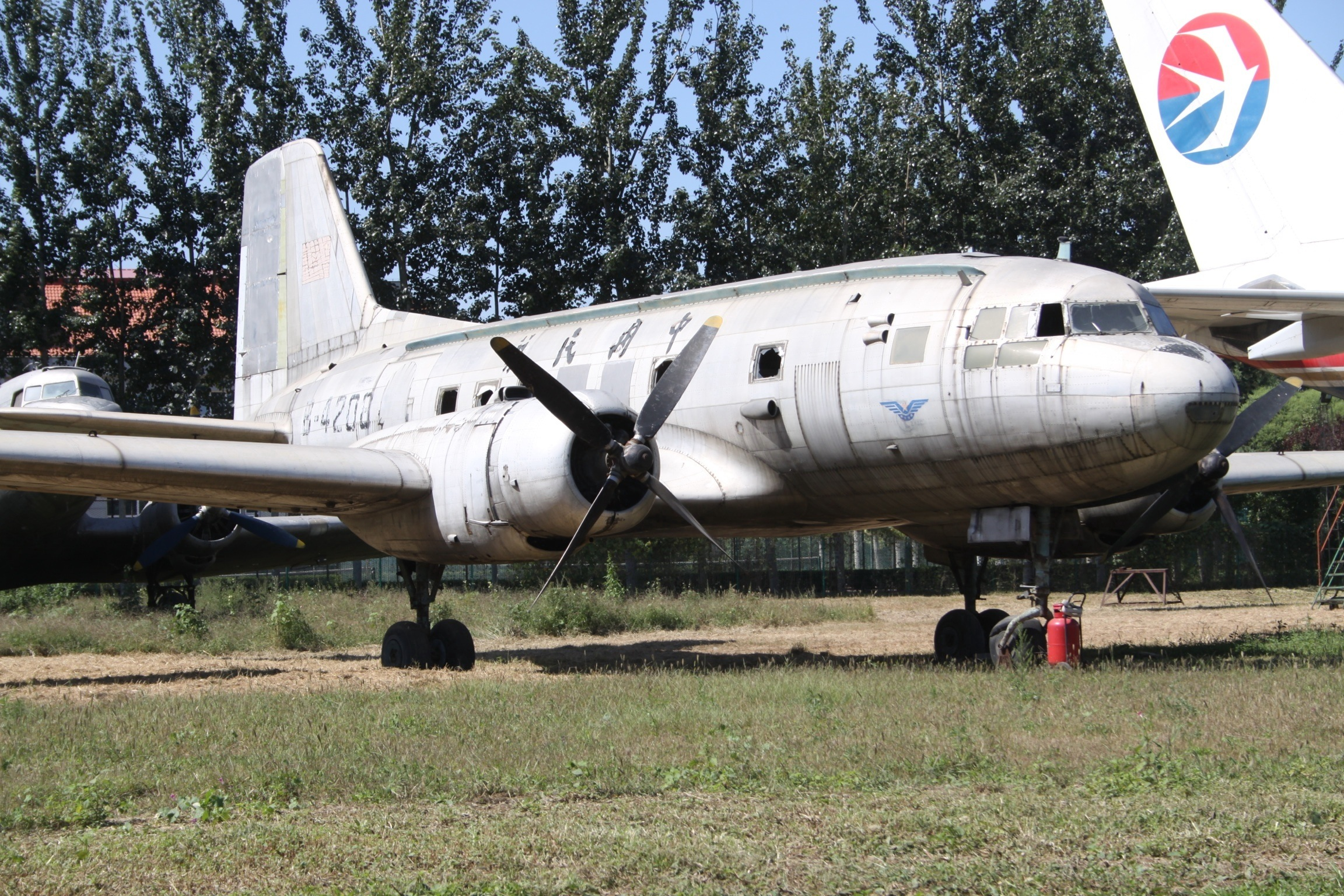
Zhongyuan Airlines Ilyushin Il-14 at the Civil Aviation Museum of China in 2008

Throughout the airline's history, the airline had operated:

| Aircraft | Total | Introduced | Retired | Notes |
|---|---|---|---|---|
| Boeing 737-300 | 5 | 1994 | 2002 | |
| Ilyushin Il-14 | 4 | 1986 | 1992 | |
| Ilyushin Il-14FK | 1 | 1986 | 1992 | |
| Xian Y-7-100 | 2 | 1991 | 2002 | |
