= SQD =

SQD may refer to:

- SQD, the IATA code for Shangrao Sanqingshan Airport, Jiangxi, China
- SQD, the UCI code for Soudal–Quick-Step Devo Team, Belgium
