= Wuhan Airlines Flight 343 =

2000 passenger plane crash in Wuhan, Hubei province, China

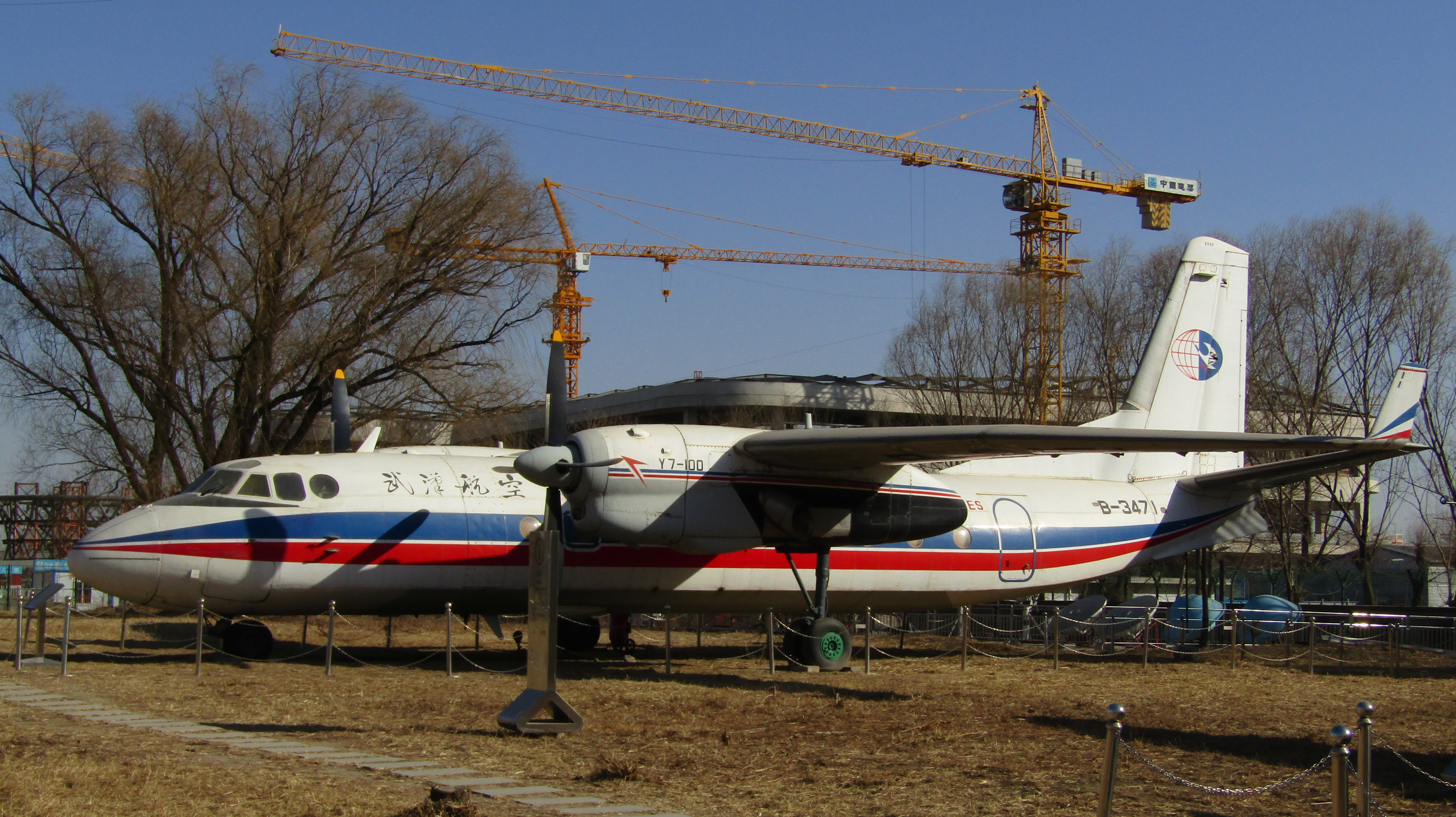
- A Wuhan Airlines Y-7, similar to the aircraft involved

Accident
- Date: 22 June 2000
- Summary: Crashed in adverse weather conditions
- Site: Hanyang District, Wuhan, China; 30.6°N 114.3°E
- Total fatalities: 49
- Total survivors: 0

Aircraft
- Aircraft type: Xian Y-7
- Operator: Wuhan Airlines
- IATA flight No.: WU343
- ICAO flight No.: CWU343
- Registration: B-3479
- Flight origin: Enshi Airport
- Destination: Wuhan Wangjiadun Airport
- Occupants: 42
- Passengers: 38
- Crew: 4
- Fatalities: 42
- Survivors: 0

Ground casualties
- Ground fatalities: 7

Location of Hubei in China

Wuhan Airlines Flight 343 was a domestic scheduled passenger flight between Enshi Airport and Wuhan Wangjiadun Airport, both in Hubei province, Central China. On 22 June 2000, the Wuhan Airlines Xian Y-7, registration B-3479, flying the route crashed after encountering an area of adverse weather; the aircraft was struck by lightning and encountered windshear.

Immediately after the accident, China ordered all of Wuhan Airlines' Xian Y-7 aircraft be grounded. One month after the accident, they were allowed to resume service.

The accident remains the deadliest involving a Xian Y-7 aircraft.

== Accident ==
The Wuhan Airlines Xian Y-7 aircraft departed Enshi Airport, on 22 June 2000, for a flight to Wuhan. As the aircraft approached Wuhan, the flight crew were informed of adverse weather conditions in the area of the airport. The flight crew circled the airport for approximately 30 minutes, waiting for the weather to improve; during this time they debated whether to divert to another airport, but the pilot decided to continue to try and land at Wuhan.

Weather stations recorded 451 thunderclaps in ten minutes during the 30 minute period the aircraft was circling above the airport. At approximately 15:00 local time, the aircraft was impacted by windshear and struck by lightning, before it crashed in Sitai Village, Yongfeng Township. The fuselage came down between 20 kilometres (12 mi; 11 nmi) and 30 kilometres (19 mi; 16 nmi) from Wuhan in two sections; half of the aircraft fell on a dike on the Han River, the other half impacted with a farmhouse. All 38 passengers and four crew were killed, along with seven people on the ground.

== Aftermath ==
In the aftermath of the accident, the Civil Aviation Administration of China (CAAC) ordered all Wuhan Airlines' six other Xian Y-7 aircraft be grounded until the cause of the crash was determined. In July they were permitted to return to service after safety inspections were carried out and flight crews received more training. The CAAC ordered all Xian Y-7 aircraft be removed from scheduled passenger service by 1 June 2001.

== Cause ==
The cause was determined to be the adverse weather the aircraft encountered, specifically the lightning strike. Other causes were the flight crew and air traffic control both violating standard operating procedures for severe weather, and incorrect decision making by the captain.

== See also ==
- LANSA Flight 508
- Air France Flight 447
- 2002 Bristow Helicopters Sikorsky S-76A crash
- Pan Am Flight 214
- List of accidents and incidents involving commercial aircraft
- 2000 in aviation
