= TSN Airport =

TSN Airport may refer to:

- Tan Son Nhat International Airport, Vietnam
- Tianjin Binhai International Airport, China, (IATA: TSN)
