= Jingzhou Shashi Airport =

Airport in Hubei province, China

- IATA: SHS; ICAO: ZHJZ

Summary
- Airport type: Public
- Serves: Jingzhou
- Location: Shashi, Jingzhou, Hubei, China
- Opened: 30 January 2021; 5 years ago
- Elevation AMSL: 29 m (95 ft)
- Coordinates: 30°17′N 112°27′E

Map
- Location of airport in Hubei

Runways
| Direction | Length | | Surface |
| Direction | m | ft | Surface |
|---|---|---|---|
| 01/19 | 2,600 | 8,530 | Concrete |

Statistics (2025)
- Passengers: 1,250,867
- Aircraft movements: 12,866
- Cargo (metric tons): 961.4
- Source: GCM, WAD

Jingzhou Shashi Airport
- Simplified Chinese: 荊州沙市机场
- Traditional Chinese: 荆州沙市機場
Transcriptions
Standard Mandarin
- Hanyu Pinyin: Jīngzhōu Shāshì Jīchǎng

Jingzhou Shashi Airport (IATA: SHS, ICAO: ZHJZ) is an airport in Shashi District of Jingzhou, in Hubei province of central China. The airport opened on 30 January 2021.

== History ==
The history of Jingzhou Shashi Airport can be traced back to its predecessors, Shashi Airport and Shashi Water Airport. Shashi had an airport as early as 1929 (the 18th year of the Republic of China), a simple seaplane airport built by the Kuomintang army west of Sanbanqiao in Shashi (now Shashi District, Jingzhou City).

In 1930, the China National Aviation Corporation established an aviation office in Shashi, opening a seaplane airport on the river from Erlangmen to Yuheping. The amphibious aircraft "Luoning" took off and landed there, and small motorboats were used to transport passengers and mail. The Shashi seaplane airport was a stopover on the Wuhan-Chongqing section of the Shanghai-Chongqing air route. Flights from Hankou to Chongqing via Shashi ran twice a week, on Wednesdays and Saturdays, and from Chongqing to Hankou via Shashi ran twice a week, on Thursdays and Sundays. In early 1936 (the 25th year of the Republic of China), two more flights were added to each route. In the autumn of 1938, the Shashi Aviation Office was dissolved, and the airport ceased operations.

In 1944, the Japanese army forced laborers to build a makeshift airfield near Sanbanqiao. The runway was made of earth, 900 meters long and 50 meters wide, for military use. However, the airfield was not put into use by the Japanese army.

In 1958, Shashi Airport was established. Sanbanqiao Airport, after joint repairs by the local government and the Civil Aviation Administration, was put into use by the Civil Aviation Administration of Hubei Province. The Wuhan-Shashi route was opened using Soviet-made An-2 aircraft, with one flight each on Tuesdays, Thursdays, and Saturdays. In 1962, due to economic reasons, the airport's flights were suspended, and the airport was temporarily lent to the Hubei Provincial Sports Commission to set up an aviation gliding school.

In May 1970, civil aviation resumed at Shashi Airport, and the 15th Flight Squadron of the Civil Aviation Administration of China transferred from Nanhu Airport in Wuhan to Shashi Airport. From 1970 to 1985, closed to 100 pilots were trained.

In the 1980s and 1990s, the former Shashi Municipal Government signed an agreement with the Guangzhou Civil Aviation Administration, and the airport was expanded twice.

On August 20, 1985, to meet the needs of local economic development and international exchange, the former Shashi Municipal People's Government and the Guangzhou Civil Aviation Administration signed an agreement to jointly invest 8 million yuan to expand Shashi Airport. The main construction included a 1600-meter-long, 30-meter-wide, and 25-centimeter-thick concrete runway; a 107-meter-long, 15-meter-wide, and 25-centimeter-thick connecting taxiway; a 60-meter-long and 30-meter-wide passenger apron and a 2189-square-meter waiting hall and air traffic control tower; a 4230-square-meter parking lot; a 217.5-square-meter south observation tower; and a simplified navigation lighting approach system for Shashi Airport. Improvements were also made to support facilities such as dispatching, meteorology, communications, power supply, and fuel supply. Construction officially began on November 6, 1985. After more than two years of construction, the first phase of the Shashi Airport expansion project was completed at the end of 1987 and passed inspection, meeting design requirements.

The second phase of expansion officially broke ground on September 25, 1992. The project lasted one year, extending the main runway from 1600 meters to 1800 meters and widening it to 45 meters. The expanded apron reached 16,000 square meters. Simultaneously, a 99.15-meter-long and 19-meter-wide connecting taxiway was expanded, along with a 3500-meter boundary ditch and 5000 meters of new metal fencing. Some ring roads were also expanded and newly constructed. Facilities for dispatching and command, communication and navigation, meteorology, fuel supply, water supply, and power supply were upgraded and modernized. New equipment, including instrument landing systems (ILS), distance measuring instruments, navigation lights, automatic weather observation systems, and satellite cloud image receivers, were added. During construction, three Short 360 aircraft were transferred to Wuhan Nanhu Airport for continued transport flights.

On November 24, 1993, the Civil Aviation Administration of China's Flight Calibration Center successfully conducted a comprehensive calibration of the communication and navigation equipment at the expanded Shashi Airport. From November 25th to 27th, an acceptance team composed of relevant departments from Guangzhou and Wuhan inspected the second phase expansion project of Shashi Airport and concluded that the project met the design requirements and passed the acceptance inspection.

In 1993, after the two phases of expansion, Shashi Airport became a 4C-class airport with an 1,800-meter runway, capable of handling Boeing 737-200, 737-300, 737-500 and other similar passenger aircraft. It has opened routes from Shashi to many cities such as Beijing, Shanghai, Shenzhen, Shantou, Guilin, and Haikou.

On December 4th, 1993, the Boeing 737 successfully completed its maiden flight at Shashi Airport. On December 28th, 1993, Shashi Airport launched its first route from Shashi to Guangzhou using a Boeing 737, and subsequently opened routes to Beijing, Shanghai, Shenzhen, Shantou, Guilin, and Haikou. Shashi Airport experienced a boom in air transport, with passenger throughput reaching 64,000 and cargo throughput reaching 825 tons in 1996.

In July 1994, China Southern Airlines invested more than 7 million yuan to expand the terminal building at Shashi Airport. The project was completed in January 1996, and the expanded terminal building had an area of 5,135.76 square meters. Since the opening of Yichang Three Gorges Airport in 1997, the passenger and cargo traffic at Shashi Airport has declined year by year. On July 1, 1997, China Southern Airlines decided to transfer the entire 15th Flight Squadron of China Southern Airlines to the management of China Southern Airlines Hubei Branch, and on April 17, 1998, it was renamed China Southern Airlines Hubei Branch Jingzhou Base.

Due to the airport's long-term losses, on May 7, 2002, after the last Shashi-Guangzhou flight departed from Shashi Airport, scheduled passenger and cargo flights at Shashi Airport were officially ceased operations. China Southern Airlines reassigned its staff and ceased operations at the airport. Subsequently, the Hubei Air Traffic Control Center and the Hubei Aviation Sports School moved in, and Shashi Airport became a general aviation airport. Since then, the airport has been largely abandoned. In December 2004, the Jingzhou base of China Southern Airlines Hubei Branch was closed.

On December 28, 2012, Shashi Airport, which had been out of service for 10 years, received a Civil Airport Operation Permit from the Civil Aviation Administration of Central and Southern China. After China Southern Airlines invested several million yuan in renovations, Shashi Airport was "reborn", but was downgraded to a 3B airport.

On October 31, 2017, the feasibility study report of Jingzhou Shashi Airport was approved by the National Development and Reform Commission of China. Located in Cenhe Town, Shashi District, Jingzhou City, Hubei Province, the airport represents a total investment of 1.298 billion yuan. It is a 4C-level feeder airport designed to handle 700,000 passengers and 2,450 tons of cargo by 2025. Construction began on October 8, 2018, and was completed by the end of 2020.

On September 26, 2020, a Cessna C560 calibration aircraft landed smoothly after completing the instrument landing system calibration. This marked the successful completion of the week-long flight calibration work at Jingzhou Airport. The calibration confirmed that all facilities and equipment at the newly built Jingzhou Airport meet civil aviation standards and are ready for operation.

On October 20, 2020, a China Southern Airlines Boeing 737-800 passenger plane, registration number B-1411, landed smoothly on the tarmac, marking the successful completion of the test flight mission at Jingzhou Airport. This was the first civilian passenger plane to make its debut at the new airport after an 18-year hiatus in civil aviation operations at Jingzhou, signifying that the airport's flight area has essentially met the conditions for civil aviation operations.

At 11:38 on January 30, 2021, China Southern Airlines flight CZ2124 bound for Guangzhou took off from Jingzhou Shashi Airport, marking the official opening of Jingzhou Shashi Airport.

On April 16, 2025, Jingzhou Airport and Jingzhou Vocational and Technical College signed a school-enterprise cooperation agreement and unveiled the "Internship and Employment Base" and "Talent Training Base". Focusing on student internships and employment, civil aviation talent training and "cabin crew" training, they will jointly explore a new collaborative development model of "industry-education integration and school-enterprise cooperation" through mechanisms such as curriculum co-construction, resource sharing and targeted training.

== Airlines and destinations ==
| Airlines | Destinations |
|---|---|
| Air Guilin | Guilin, Shenyang |
| Beijing Capital Airlines | Nanning, Qingdao |
| China Eastern Airlines | Shanghai–Pudong |
| China Express Airlines | Chongqing, Guiyang, Ningbo, Taizhou, Tianjin, Yangzhou |
| China Southern Airlines | Beijing–Daxing, Guangzhou |
| Donghai Airlines | Shenzhen, Taiyuan, Xi'an, Zhuhai |
| Hainan Airlines | Haikou, Sanya |
| Kunming Airlines | Jinan, Kunming |
| Loong Air | Chengdu–Tianfu, Hangzhou, Lanzhou, Wenzhou |
| XiamenAir | Fuzhou, Xiamen |

== See also ==
- List of airports in China
