= Wuhan Airlines Flight 4211 =

1992 aviation accident in China

- An Ilyushin Il-14, similar to the aircraft involved in the accident

Accident
- Date: 8 October 1992
- Summary: Engine failure due to mechanical failure
- Site: Huajia Village, Baotai Town, Pingyi County; 35.57°N 117.70°E

Aircraft
- Aircraft type: Ilyushin Il-14
- Operator: Wuhan Airlines
- Registration: B-4211
- Flight origin: Lanzhou Zhongchuan International Airport, Lanzhou, China
- Destination: Xi'an Xianyang International Airport, Xi'an, China
- Occupants: 35
- Passengers: 28
- Crew: 7
- Fatalities: 14
- Survivors: 21

Wuhan Airlines Flight 4211 was a domestic charter flight from Lanzhou, China to Xi’an, China. On 8 October 1992, the aircraft operating the flight crashed into a mountain range after suffering an engine failure on takeoff, killing 14 of the 35 people on board.

Follow the crash, the Civil Aviation Administration of China had grounded the operation of all Ilyushin Il-14 aircraft.

== Aircraft ==
The aircraft involved was an Avia 14 manufactured in 1958 and registered as B-4211. At the time of the accident, the plane was considered to be unsuitable for standard conditions.

There were 7 crew members: captain, first officer, navigator, radio operator, flight engineer, and two flight attendants. 28 passengers were on board, 14 of them were from Taiwanese "Silk Road Tour" group (11 Taiwanese and 3 Chinese), and 14 French passengers.

== Accident ==
At 15:03, 45 minutes into the flight, the plane reached an altitude of 3,000 meters (9,840 feet). The left engine then lost power and failed for half a minute and its right engine didn't work properly. The crew requested for an emergency landing at Yuzhong Xiaguanying Airport. The plane only maintained its original altitude for 20 minutes before losing speed and descending. As the mountainside appeared, the crew determined that they would crash-landed into the hill. The left wing struck the ground first, ruptured the left landing gear and disintergrated with fire following the impact. Five crew member and nine French passengers died.According from a witness:

It was around 3:30 PM. I was at my front door when suddenly a plane flew overhead from east to west. It flew very low and made a loud noise, but the sound was a little different from usual. At the time, I thought it was doing some kind of surveying, and that's why it was so loud at such a low altitude. Just as it passed, I heard a loud "bang" and then it disappeared. I figured it had just passed over a mountain and the noise had stopped abruptly, so I didn't pay much attention and went straight home. As soon as I entered the house, I heard someone crying from the mountaintop. I immediately ran out. It turned out to be a woman from our village named Wang Lan who was herding sheep. She had seen the plane crash and was crying out, "A plane has crashed! Go up and see!" My father heard it too and was shouting. As soon as I heard that, I immediately ran up the mountain. By then, all our neighbors had heard it and came running, and we all ran up the mountain together.

== Investigation ==
The investigation concluded that the left-engine shutdown was caused by a punctured insulation layer of the engine generator. It damaged the ignition nozzle that lead to the failure. The plane was found to had been neglected for a long time due to lack of maintenance, and was in poor condition.
