= Tianjin Binhai International Airport =

Airport serving Tianjin, China

Tianjin Binhai International Airport 天津滨海国际机场
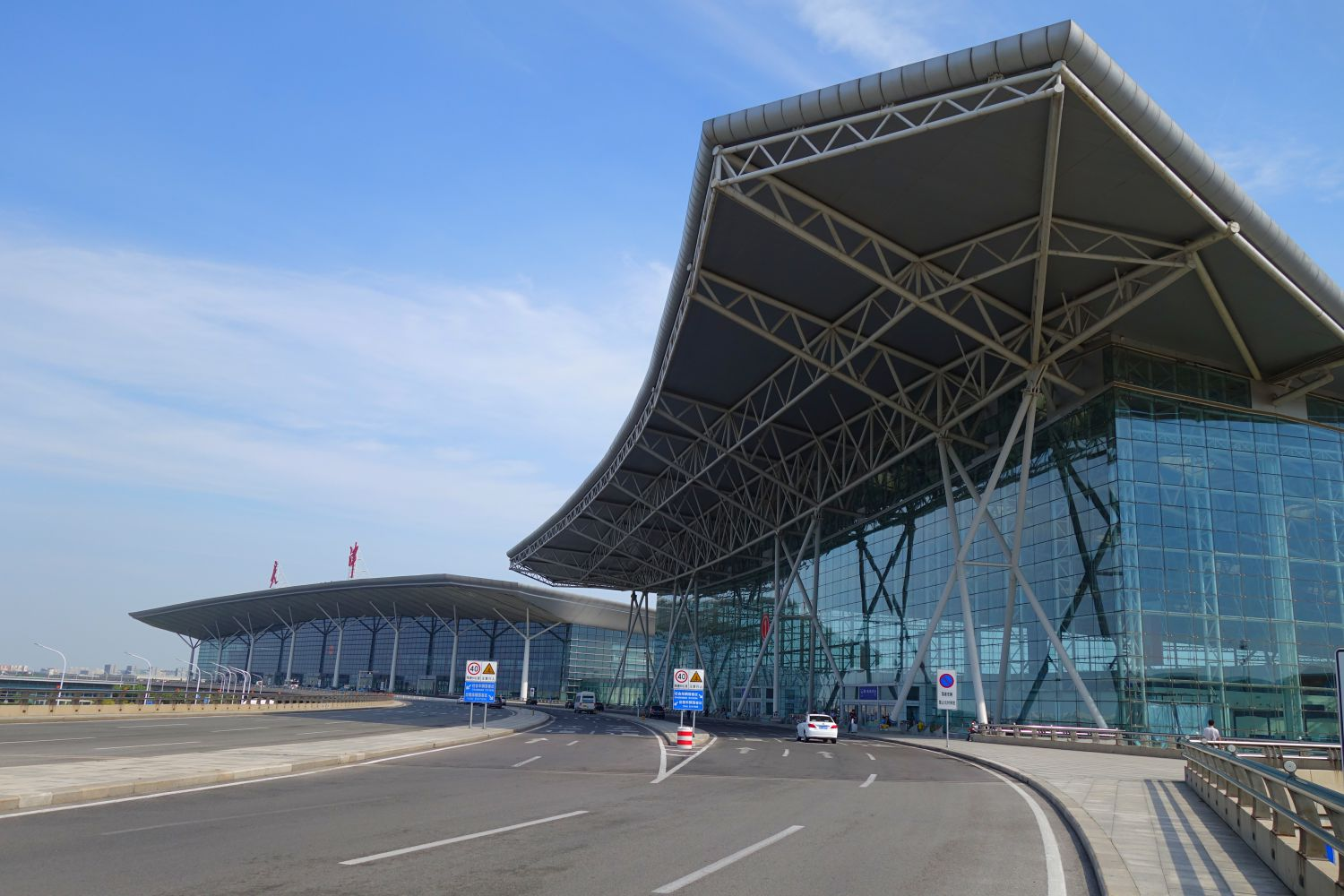
- IATA: TSN; ICAO: ZBTJ

Summary
- Airport type: Public
- Operator: Civil Aviation Administration of China
- Serves: Jing-Jin-Ji
- Location: Dongli, Tianjin, China
- Opened: November 1939; 87 years ago
- Hub for: Okay Airways; Tianjin Airlines
- Focus city for: Air China; XiamenAir
- Elevation AMSL: 3 m (9.8 ft)
- Coordinates: 39°07′28″N 117°20′46″E
- Website: www.tbia.cn

Maps
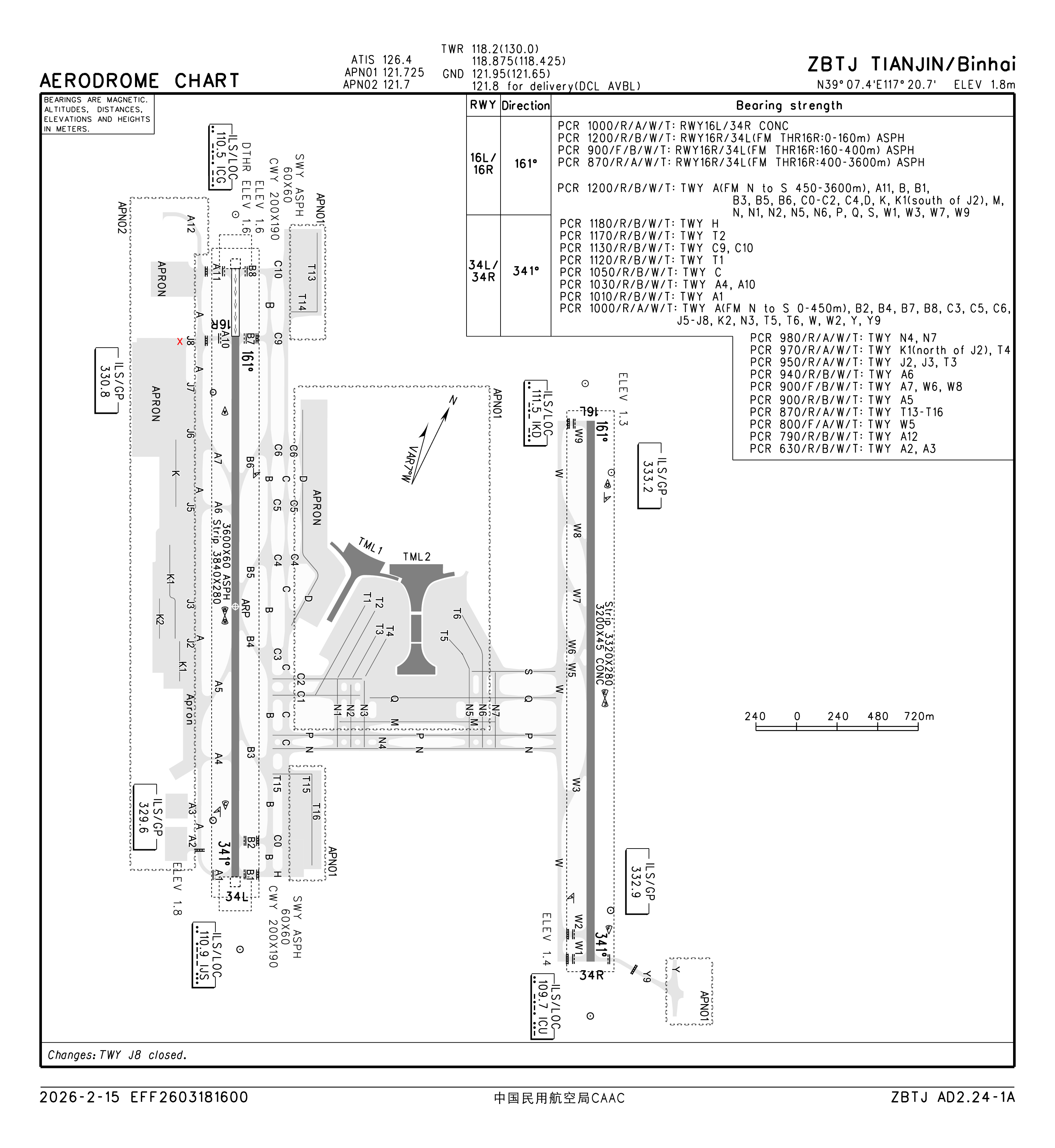
- CAAC airport chart

- Location in Tianjin Location in China

Runways
Direction	Length		Surface
Direction	m	ft	Surface
16R/34L	3,600	11,811	Concrete
16L/34R	3,200	10,499	Concrete

Statistics (2025)
- Passengers: 19,862,196
- Tonnes of cargo: 133,023.3
- Aircraft movements: 146,768
- Source: China's busiest airports by passenger traffic

Tianjin Binhai International Airport
- Simplified Chinese: 天津滨海国际机场
- Traditional Chinese: 天津濱海國際機場
Transcriptions
Standard Mandarin
- Hanyu Pinyin: Tiānjīn Bīnhǎi Guójì Jīchǎng

Tianjin Binhai International Airport (IATA: TSN, ICAO: ZBTJ) is an international airport serving Tianjin, the municipality in North China. It is one of the major air cargo centers in the People's Republic of China. Among the four municipalities in China, Tianjin Binhai International Airport is one of two international airport that not classified 4F-class (the other is Shanghai Hongqiao Airport).

It is the hub airport for Tianjin Airlines, established in 2004, and privately owned Okay Airways, as well as a focus city for Air China.

In 2025, Tianjin Binhai International Airport handled 19,862,196 passengers, a drop of 1.0% over 2024, making it the 26th busiest airport in China.

The airport is also the site of the Airbus A320 final assembly line which started operations in 2008, and Airbus A330 Completion and Delivery Center which was completed by the end of 2017.

In 2018, Hainan Airlines started operating flights to Vancouver, making it the first intercontinental route serving the airport. However, the route was terminated in January 2019.

== Development of the airport ==
Before 2005, commercial flights were handled in what is now the airport's cargo terminal. In 2006, a larger terminal was built and is now the passenger terminal. A huge expansion was made to the passenger terminal around 2010 to accommodate more passengers. It has 47 jet bridges and is one of the largest airports in China. It is located in a state-of-the-art terminal building, which is more than three times bigger than the previous terminal, at 116,000 m^{2} (1,250,000 sq ft). When the three construction phases are completed, the airport terminal will be over 500,000 m^{2} (5,400,000 sq ft) and will be able to handle 40 million passengers per year. Over the period of the project the airport site will enlarge from the current 25 km^{2} (9.7 sq mi) to 80 km^{2} (30.9 sq mi). The airport as a whole will resemble Amsterdam's Schiphol Airport in size and will be able to handle over 500,000 tons of cargo and 200,000 flights per year.

The expansion, with a total investment of nearly ¥3 billion (US$409.5 million), widened the runway to 75 m (246 ft) (from previous 50 m (160 ft)), and lengthened it to 3,600 m (11,800 ft). In May 2009, the airport also completed the construction of a second runway, with the expected number of passengers exceeding ten million.

Tianjin Airlines is headquartered in the terminal.

On 28 August 2014, Tianjin Binhai International Airport Terminal 2 came into use. The second floor is used as an arrivals hall, while the first floor is a departure hall. Underground, on level B1, there is a public transport hub, used to connect the airport terminal to various methods of public transportation. This includes a subway station level, a transfer hall and an underground parking lot. Terminal 2 is connected to subway line number 2, meaning that passengers can get to the terminal straight from Tianjin railway station.

== Airlines and destinations ==
=== Passenger ===
Tianjin Binhai International Airport (TSN) plans to operate a total of 120 routes and serve 97 cities during the 2025 winter and spring flight season (26 October 2025 to 28 March 2026).

Airlines	Destinations
Air China	Changchun, Changsha, Chengdu–Shuangliu, Chengdu–Tianfu, Chongqing, Dalian, Guangzhou, Guilin, Guiyang, Haikou, Hangzhou, Harbin, Hohhot, Hong Kong, Kunming, Lanzhou, Nanning, Ordos, Seoul–Incheon, Shanghai–Hongqiao, Shanghai–Pudong, Shenzhen, Taiyuan, Tokyo–Narita, Tonghua, Ürümqi, Wenzhou, Wuhan, Xiamen, Xi'an, Xining, Yinchuan, Zhuhai
Asiana Airlines	Seoul–Incheon
Beijing Capital Airlines	Lijiang, Sanya
Chengdu Airlines	Chengdu–Shuangliu
China Eastern Airlines	Kunming, Lanzhou, Lianyungang, Shanghai–Hongqiao, Shanghai–Pudong, Wuhan, Xi'an
China Express Airlines	Changsha, Changzhi, Chongqing, Dalian, Dongying, Ganzhou, Guiyang, Jingzhou, Jixi, Khabarovsk, Kunming, Linfen, Qiqihar, Shuozhou, Xishuangbanna, Yan'an, Zhangjiajie
China Southern Airlines	Dalian, Guangzhou, Guiyang, Hotan, Jieyang, Shenzhen, Ürümqi, Wuhan, Yiwu
China United Airlines	Wenzhou
Colorful Guizhou Airlines	Guiyang, Huai'an
Dalian Airlines	Dalian
Donghai Airlines	Nantong, Taizhou, Zhuhai
EVA Air	Taipei–Taoyuan
Fuzhou Airlines	Fuzhou, Harbin, Xi'an, Zhoushan
GX Airlines	Harbin, Shangrao
Hainan Airlines	Ankang, Changsha, Dalian, Guangzhou, Haikou, Harbin, Nanning, Ningbo, Shenzhen
Hunnu Air	Ulaanbaatar
Japan Airlines	Nagoya–Centrair
Jiangxi Air	Nanchang
Juneyao Air	Shanghai–Pudong
Korean Air	Seoul–Incheon
LJ Air	Harbin, Zhanjiang
Lucky Air	Chengdu–Tianfu, Dali
Okay Airways	Changchun, Changsha, Chengdu–Tianfu, Chongqing, Ezhou, Guangzhou, Guilin, Hangzhou, Hefei, Jieyang, Kunming, Nanning, Sanya, Shenzhen, Wuhan, Xi'an, Xinyang
Qingdao Airlines	Changchun, Fuzhou
Ruili Airlines	Baotou, Enshi, Kunming, Lijiang, Xishuangbanna
Scoot	Singapore
Shandong Airlines	Changchun, Harbin, Xiamen, Yinchuan, Zhuhai
Shanghai Airlines	Shanghai–Hongqiao, Shanghai–Pudong, Wenzhou
Shenzhen Airlines	Nanchang, Nantong, Quanzhou, Shenzhen
Sichuan Airlines	Beihai, Chengdu–Shuangliu, Chengdu–Tianfu, Chongqing, Fuzhou, Haikou, Harbin, Kunming, Lanzhou, Nanchang, Nanning, Ningbo, Phuket
Spring Airlines	Jeju, Lanzhou, Nanchang, Ningbo, Sanya
Spring Japan	Tokyo–Narita
Thai Lion Air	Bangkok–Don Mueang
Tianjin Airlines	Anqing, Bozhou, Changsha, Chengdu–Tianfu, Chifeng, Chongqing, Dalian, Guangzhou, Guiyang, Haikou, Hailar, Hangzhou, Harbin, Hengyang, Hohhot, Hotan, Jieyang, Kunming, Lanzhou, London–Heathrow, Lüliang, Manzhouli, Nanyang, Osaka–Kansai, Qingyang, Sanya, Seoul–Incheon, Shanghai–Hongqiao, Shanghai–Pudong, Shenzhen, Shangrao, Shiyan, Sydney–Kingsford Smith, Taiyuan, Taizhou, Tokyo–Haneda, Tongliao, Ürümqi, Wuhai, Xiamen, Xi'an, Xilinhot, Xishuangbanna, Yanji, Yantai, Yichang, Yulin (Shaanxi), Zhengzhou
VietJet Air	Nha Trang
Vietnam Airlines	Nha Trang
West Air	Chongqing
XiamenAir	Bangkok–Suvarnabhumi, Changchun, Changsha, Chongqing, Dalian, Fuzhou, Guangzhou, Haikou, Hangzhou, Harbin, Quanzhou, Shanghai–Hongqiao, Shenzhen, Ürümqi, Xiamen, Xi'an, Yinchuan, Yuncheng
Xizang Airlines	Chongqing, Lhasa, Nanchong, Xining

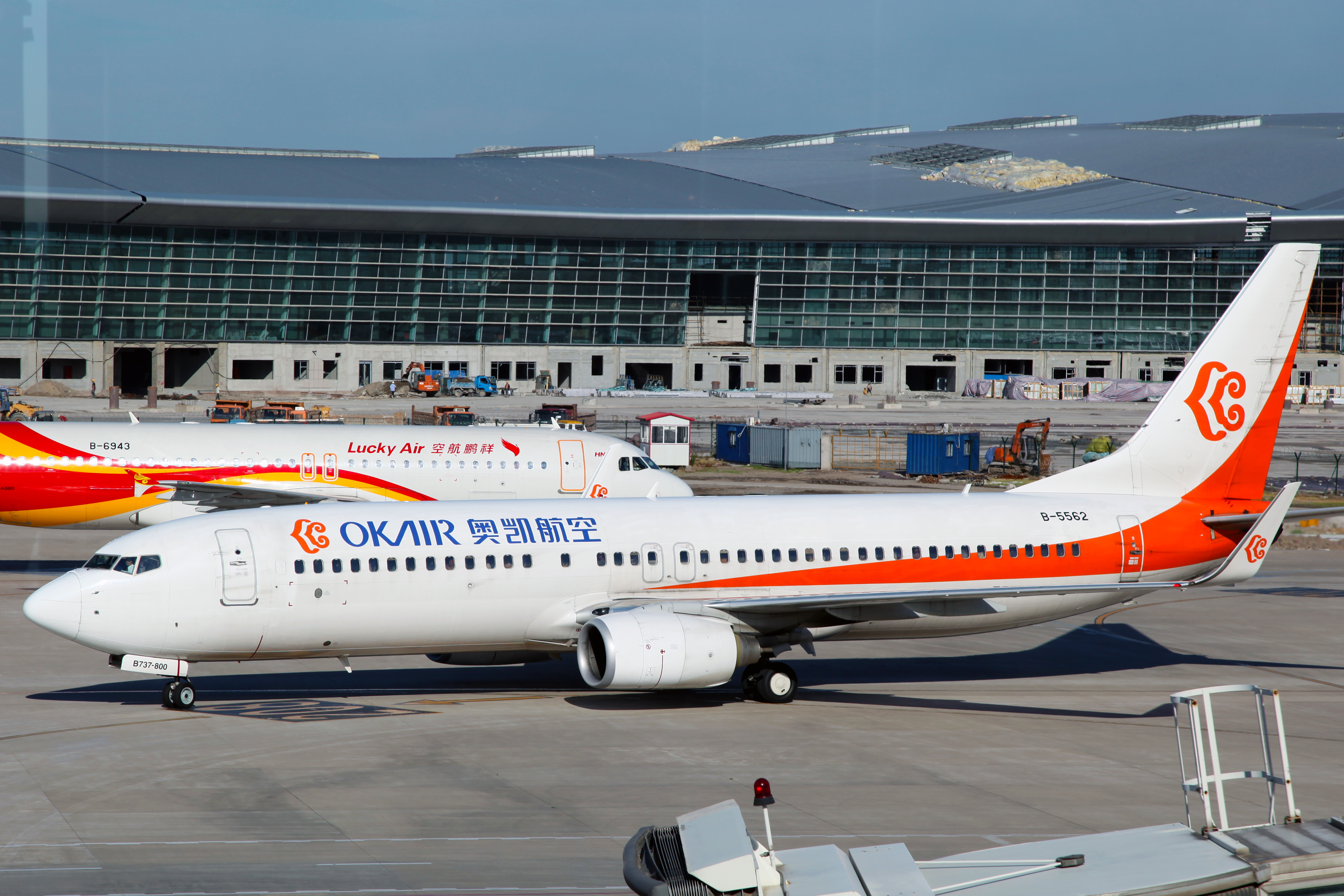
An Okay Airways Boeing 737-800 at Binhai

=== Cargo ===
In 2025, the airport handled 133,023.3 tonnes of cargo and mail, ranking 26th among Chinese airports.

Airlines	Destinations
Air China Cargo	Shanghai–Pudong
ANA Cargo	Dalian, Osaka–Kansai, Tokyo–Narita
Central Airlines	Paris–Charles de Gaulle, Tokyo–Narita
China Cargo Airlines	Shanghai–Pudong
Grizodubova Air Company	Abakan
Hong Kong Air Cargo	Hong Kong
Lufthansa Cargo	Frankfurt, Krasnoyarsk
Korean Air Cargo	Seoul–Incheon
Okay Airways Cargo	Seoul–Incheon
Tianjin Air Cargo	Osaka–Kansai, Tokyo–Narita, Wuxi
TransAVIAexport Airlines	Novosibirsk
Uzbekistan Airways	Navoiy
Volga-Dnepr	Abakan

== Statistics ==
In 2008, the airport handled 166,558 tonnes of freight, and became the 11th busiest airport in China. Tianjin Airport is also among the fastest-growing airports in China, registering a 20.2% increase by passenger traffic and a 33.2% increase in terms of cargo traffic in 2008.

Traffic by calendar year
	Passengers	Aircraft movements	Freight (tons)
2000	884,448	－	44,387
2001	941,178	－	36,503
2002	1,092,121	－	41,722
2003	1,103,491	－	48,681
2004	1,705,271	－	70,995
2005	2,193,914	47,460	80,192
2006	2,766,504	54,948	96,756
2007	3,860,752	65,664	125,087
2008	4,637,299	70,279	166,558
2009	5,780,281	75,116	168,103
2010	7,277,106	85,034	202,484
2011	7,554,172	84,831	182,856
2012	8,139,988	83,700	194,241
2013	10,035,833	100,729	214,420
2014	12,073,041	114,557	233,359
2015	14,314,322	125,693	217,279
2016	16,871,889	143,822	237,085
2017	21,005,001	169,585	268,283
2018	23,591,412	179,414	258,735
2019	23,813,318	167,869	226,163
2020	13,285,478	115,770	184,980
2021	15,127,110	125,328	194,887
2022	5,841,680	60,173	131,517
2024	20,063,745	148,889	137,322
2025	19,862,196	146,768	133,023

== Ground transportation ==
The Airport is served by Binhai International Airport Station on Line 2 of the Tianjin Metro since the station's opening on 28 August 2014. The metro fare to downtown is ¥3.

== See also ==
- Transport in Tianjin
- List of airports in the People's Republic of China
- China's busiest airports by passenger traffic

== Links ==
- Official website
