= Shangrao Sanqingshan Airport =

Shangrao Sanqingshan Airport 上饶三清山机场
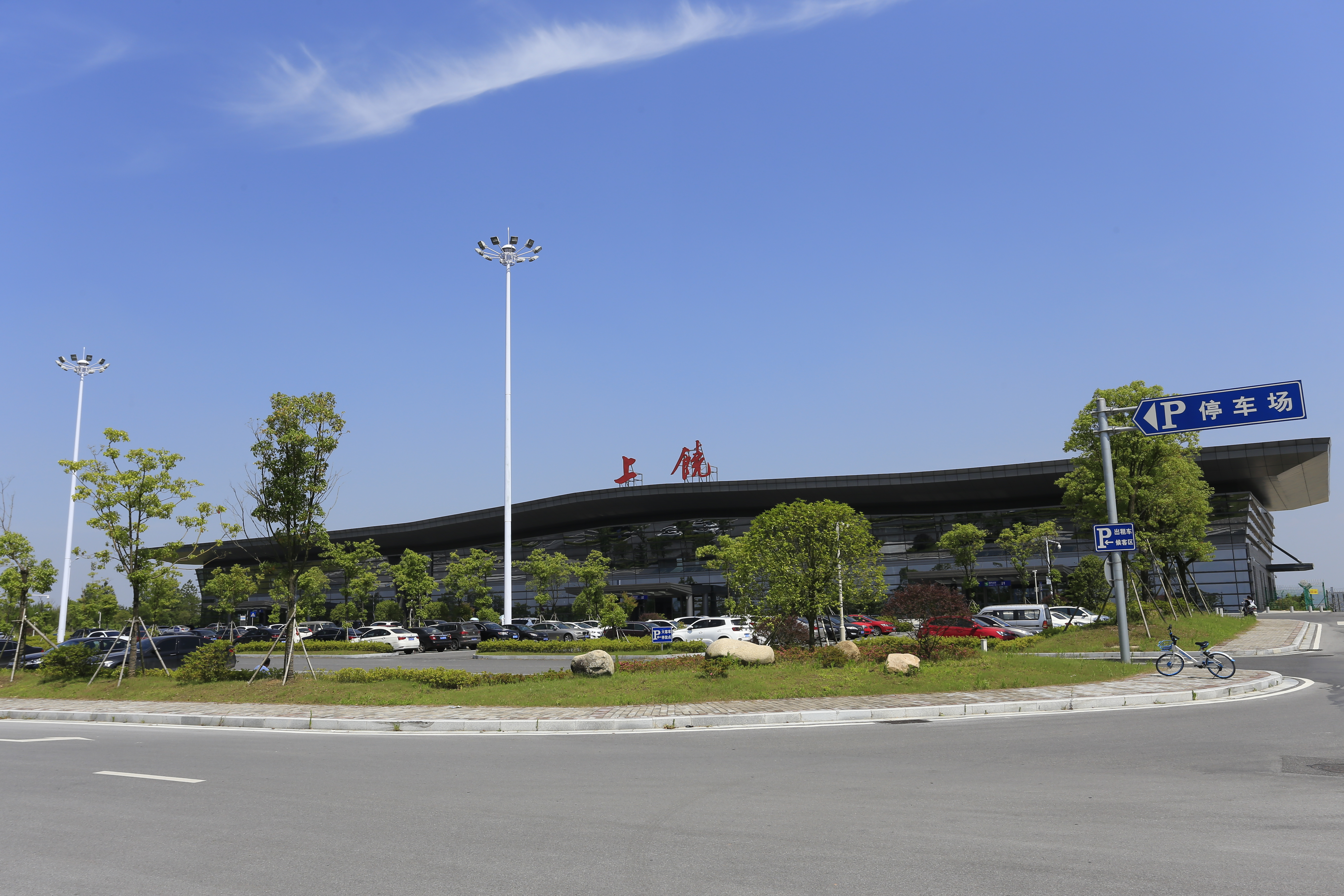
- IATA: SQD; ICAO: ZSSR

Summary
- Airport type: Public
- Serves: Shangrao, Jiangxi
- Opened: 28 May 2017
- Coordinates: 28°22′49″N 117°57′41″E

Map
- Location of airport in Jiangxi

Runways
Direction	Length		Surface
Direction	m	ft	Surface
06/24	2,400	7,874	Concrete

Statistics (2025)
- Passengers: 834,070
- Aircraft movements: 6,704
- Cargo (metric tons): 146.8

Shangrao Sanqingshan Airport
- Simplified Chinese: 上饶三清山机场
- Traditional Chinese: 上饒三清山機場
Transcriptions
Standard Mandarin
- Hanyu Pinyin: Shàngráo Sānqīngshān Jīchǎng

Shangrao Sanqingshan Airport (IATA: SQD, ICAO: ZSSR) is an airport serving the city of Shangrao in the northeast of Jiangxi province, China. The airport is 8 kilometres (5.0 mi) from the city center (16 km by road) and 47 kilometres (29 mi) from Mount Sanqing National Park, the World Heritage Site after which it is named. In addition to Shangrao, the airport also serves the nearby cities of Yingtan and Fuzhou, Jiangxi.

The airport was approved by the State Council of China in October 2011, and construction started on 8 July 2012. Shangrao Sanqingshan Airport was budgeted to cost 666 million yuan to build (approximately US$105 million) and was partially funded with a $50 million loan from the World Bank. It was the first Chinese aviation project funded by the World Bank.

The airport opened on 28 May 2017, with an inaugural Sichuan Airlines flight from Chengdu Shuangliu Airport.

== History ==
The Sanqingshan Airport project in Shangrao, Jiangxi, has secured a US$50 million loan from the World Bank, with an additional government investment of approximately US$55 million. It is the World Bank’s first airport loan project in China. Sanqingshan Airport follows the concept of a green airport. The terminal building is designed in accordance with green‑building standards, emphasizing energy conservation and reduced consumption, making full use of natural ventilation, daylighting, and an extended roof structure for shading.

Shangrao Sanqingshan Airport is China's first regional airport to implement the green airport concept and green construction. Construction officially began in December 2013, and it was completed in three and a half years. The airport's maiden flight took place on May 28, 2017.

== Facilities ==
The airport has a 2,400-meter runway and a 6,000-square-meter terminal building.

== Airlines and destinations ==
Airlines	Destinations
9 Air	Dalian, Guangzhou
Air China	Beijing–Capital
Air Travel	Kunming
Donghai Airlines	Chengdu–Tianfu, Jinan, Shenzhen, Taiyuan, Zhengzhou
GX Airlines	Haikou, Harbin, Tianjin
Tianjin Airlines	Chongqing, Sanya, Tianjin, Xi'an

== See also ==
- List of airports in China
- List of the busiest airports in China
