= Shandong Airlines =

Chinese airline

Shandong Airlines Co., Ltd. 山东航空集团

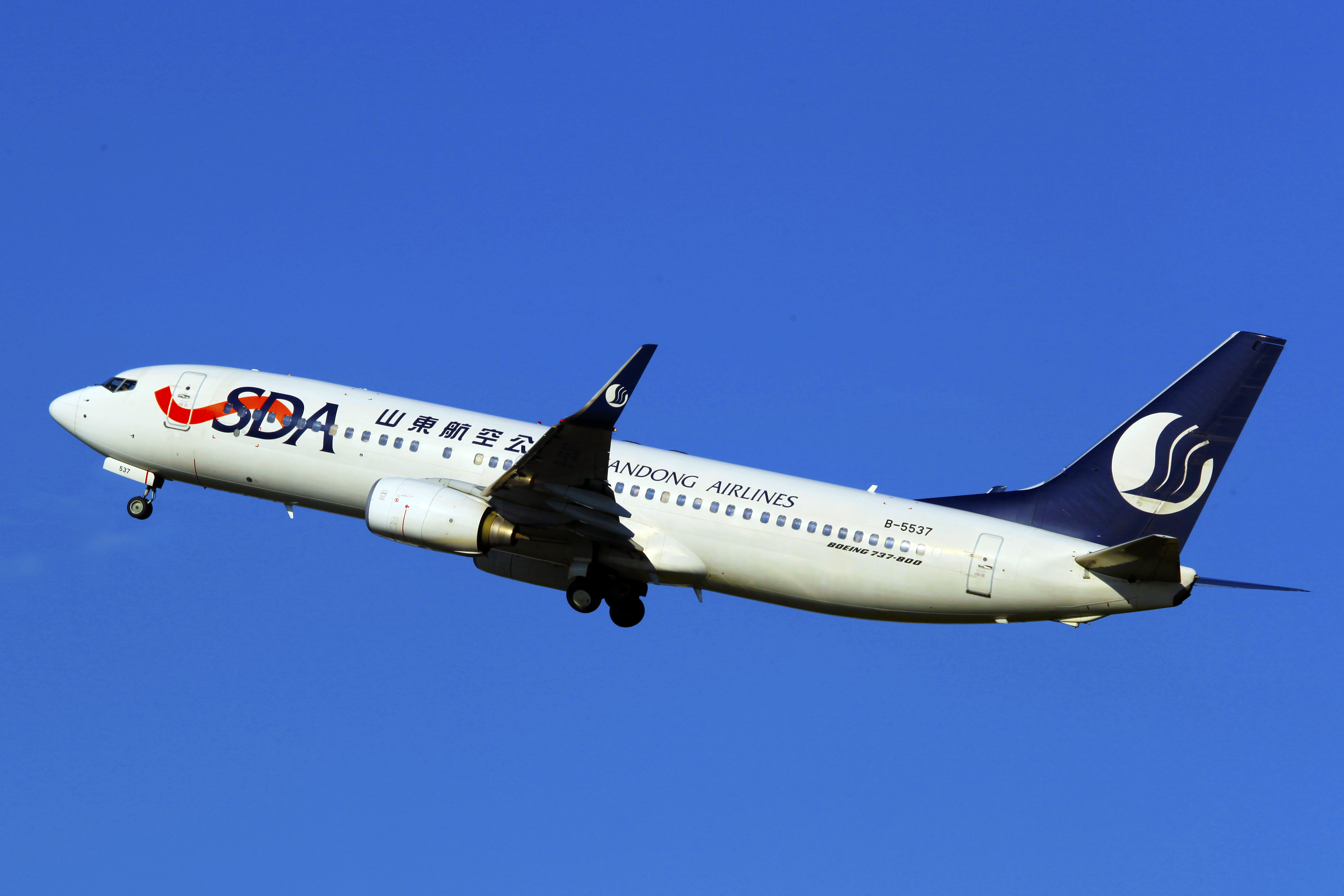
- Shandong Airlines Boeing 737-800 in 2013
IATA	ICAO	Call sign
SC	CDG	SHANDONG
- Founded: 12 March 1994; 32 years ago
- Hubs: Jinan; Qingdao
- Focus cities: Beijing–Capital; Chongqing; Xiamen; Yantai–Penglai
- Frequent-flyer program: Phoenix Miles
- Fleet size: 140
- Destinations: 73
- Parent company: Air China (51%)
- Headquarters: Shandong Airlines Center, Second Ring Road East No. 5746, Lixia District, Jinan, Shandong
- Key people: Xu Chuanyu (president)
- Employees: 13,544
- Website: www.sda.cn

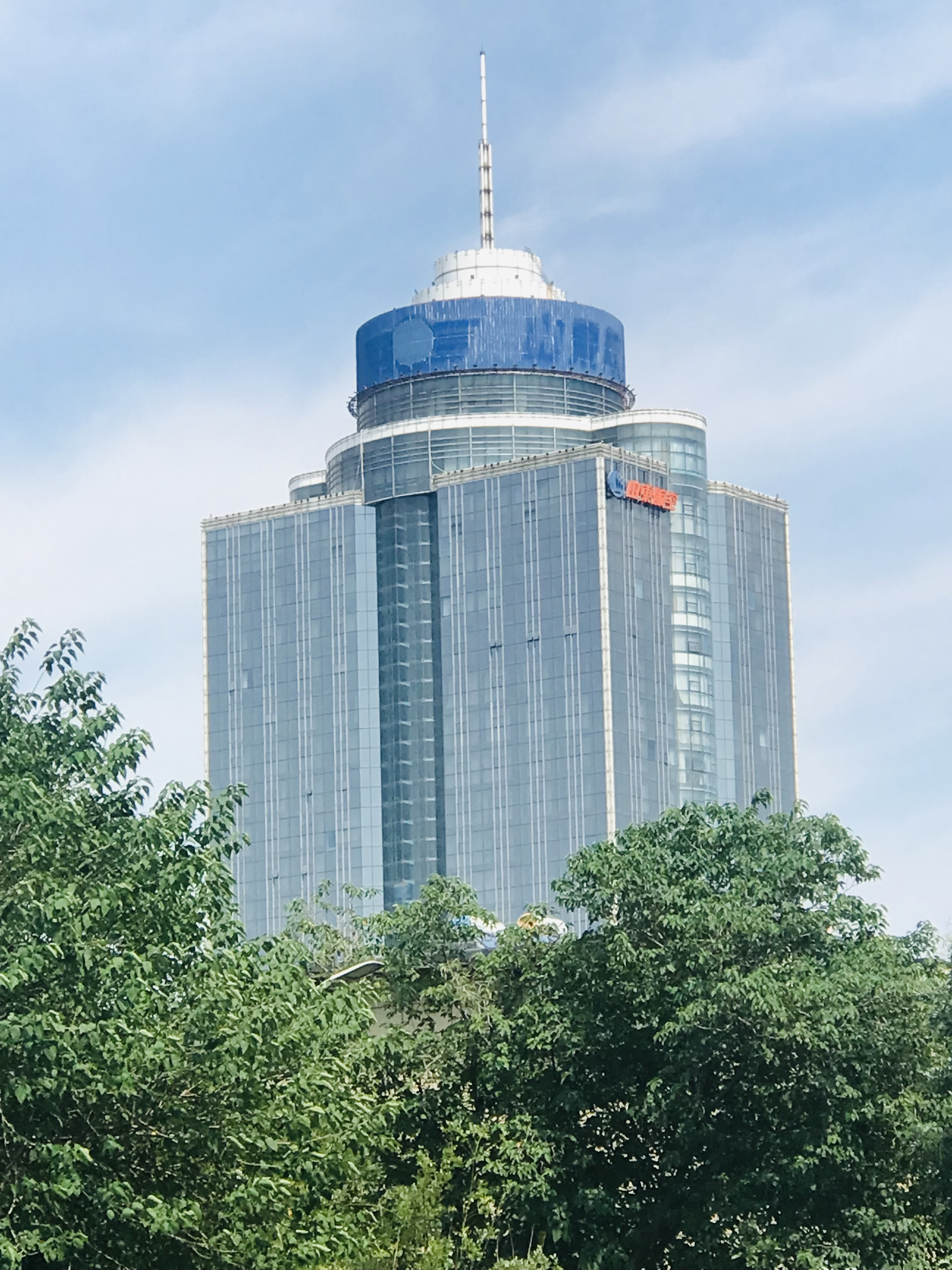
Shandong Airlines headquarters

Shandong Airlines Co., Ltd. (Chinese: 山东航空; pinyin: Shāndōng Hángkōng; nicknamed SDA or 山航; Shānháng) is an airline based in the Shandong Airlines Center (山东航空大厦; Shāndōng Hángkōng Dàshà) in Jinan, Shandong. The Chinese carrier operates a sizable domestic network from Jinan, Qingdao, and Yantai to major cities across China, together with an international network to regional Asian destinations. The airline's two largest shareholders are Shandong Aviation Group, with a 37% controlling stake, and Air China, a strategic partner, holding 51% of the airlines shares.

Shandong Airlines was established on 12 March 1994 and started operations in September of the same year. In September 1997, it became a founding member of the New Star (Xinxing) Aviation Alliance together with five other Chinese provincial airlines. The purpose of the alliance was to improve finances and deter takeover from larger competitors. The airline's first of many new international services commenced on 8 June 2004, connecting Jinan to Singapore via Shenzhen.

Shandong Airlines is the ninth largest airline in China as of September 2026. With fleet of 140 Boeing 737 aircraft in operation, Shandong Airlines is the world's fifth largest airline when operating all excusively Boeing aircraft and also the world's third largest Boeing 737 operator.

== History ==
=== Early years ===
Shandong Airlines commenced operations in 1994 with a single Xi'an Y-7-100 aircraft. In 1995, Shandong Airlines placed an order for 3 Boeing 737-300 aircraft scheduled for delivery in December 1995, January 1996, and August 1996. This would have allowed the airline to operate 60 weekly flights to 10 destinations. In 1997, Shandong Airlines signed a letter of intent to order 3 Saab 2000 aircraft. In September 1997, Shandong Airlines (along with Hainan Airlines, Shenzhen Airlines, Sichuan Airlines, Wuhan Airlines, and Zhongyuan Airlines) formed the New Star (Xinxing) Air Alliance, which was to commence operations on 1 January 1998. Shandong Airlines also acquired 2 more Boeing 737-300 aircraft in 1998. In 1999, Shandong Airlines and Bombardier signed a deal for 5 Bombardier CRJ200 aircraft, becoming the first Chinese airline to operate the type for scheduled revenue services.

=== Expansion ===
During October 2000, Shandong Airlines announced plans to acquire Shanxi Airlines. A week after plans to acquire Shanxi Airlines was announced, it was reported that China Northwest Airlines was close to acquiring Shandong Airlines. Later in November, Shandong Airlines placed an order for a single Cessna 208B Grand Caravan and 2 Cessna 208 Caravan 675 aircraft in order to expand market opportunities. In 2001, it was announced that Shandong Airlines was to launch freight services with 2 Boeing 737 freighter aircraft. The airline was also to expand its passenger fleet as well.

At the end of April 2001, Shandong Airlines (along with China Postal Airlines, Shanghai Airlines, Shenzhen Airlines, Sichuan Airlines, and Wuhan Airlines) formed a partnership known as "China Sky Aviation Enterprises". The partnership would rationalise operations and reduce competition through codesharing. On 9 May 2000, Shandong Airline's deal to acquire Shanxi Airlines fell apart, with Hainan Airlines securing a tentative take-over agreement of Shanxi Airlines. In 2002, it was announced that Shandong Airlines (along with China Southern Airlines and Shanghai Airlines) were to purchase shares in Sichuan Airlines, with Shandong Airlines eyeing an 8% stake.

In September 2002, Shandong Airlines announced an order for 2 Bombardier CRJ700 aircraft, becoming the first Chinese operator of the type. The order came after the cancellation of an order for 2 additional Bombardier Challenger 604 aircraft. In 2003, it was reported that Air China was seeking to acquire a 20% stake in Shandong Airlines, and a 26% stake its parent company, Shandong Aviation Group. The deal was later finalised in March 2004, acquiring a 22.8% stake in the airline, and over 40% stake in the Shandong Aviation Group. In September 2003, it was announced that Shandong Airlines has ordered 10 Comac ARJ21 aircraft (now known as the Comac C909). Shandong Airlines launched its first international route, flying from Jinan to Singapore via Shenzhen. In 2005, Shandong Airlines partnered with Spartan School of Aeronautics to open the Qingdao Jiutian Spartan Flight Academy, with both Shandong Airlines and Spartan acuqiring shares of the flight school. In April 2006, Shandong Airlines' charter subsidiary, Rainbow Jet, announced the sale of its 2 Bombardier Challenger 604 aircraft and the end of its business jet charter operations, having failed to turn a profit. In July 2007, Shandong Airlines placed its fleet of Cessna 208 aircraft for sale. In 2009, Shandong Airlines along with Air China placed a joint order for 3 flight simulators, to be delivered in 2010.

=== Recent developments ===
On 21 April 2014, Shandong Airlines committed to order 50 Boeing 737 aircraft, including 16 737NG aircraft and 34 737 MAX aircraft.

== Destinations ==
As of April 2026, the airline operates flights to destinations in East Asia and Southeast Asia.

=== Codeshare agreements ===
Shandong Airlines has codeshare agreements with the following airlines:

- Air China
- Air Macau
- Asiana Airlines
- China Express Airlines
- EVA Air
- Qingdao Airlines
- Shenzhen Airlines
- Sichuan Airlines
- Uni Air

== Fleet ==
=== Current fleet ===
As of May 2026, Shandong Airlines operates the following aircraft:

Aircraft	In service	Orders	Passengers				Notes
Aircraft	In service	Orders	J	W	Y	Total	Notes
Boeing 737-700	2	—	8	—	119	127	All stored and to be phased out.
Boeing 737-800	118	10	8	—	162	170	
Boeing 737 MAX 8	15	10	8	18	150	176	
SDA Cargo fleet
Boeing 737-800BCF	5	—	Cargo				
Total	140	20					

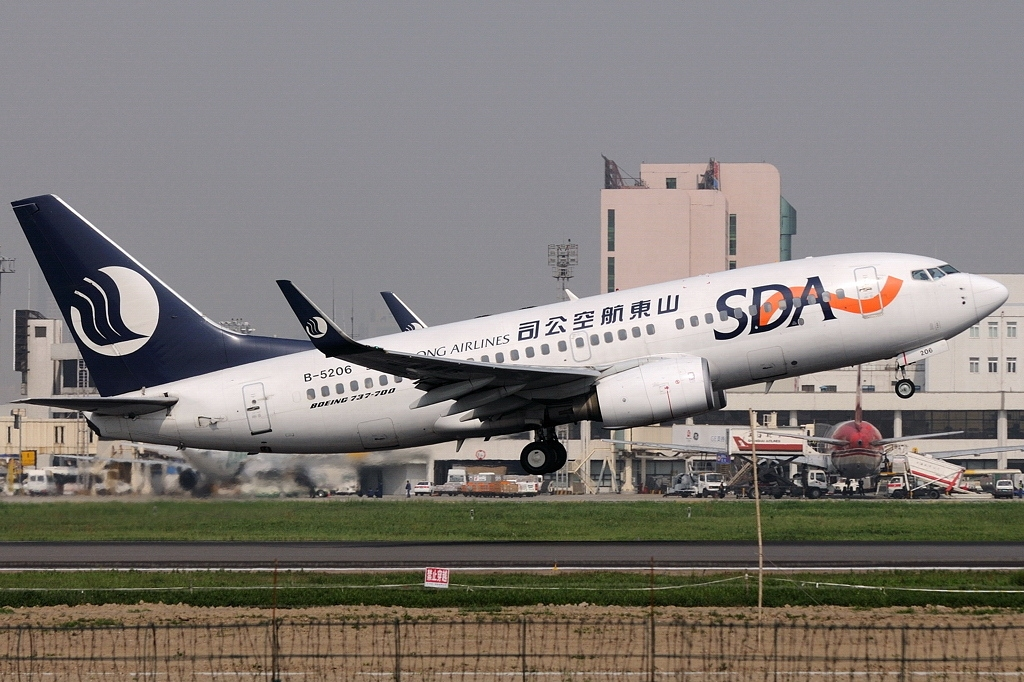
Shandong Airlines Boeing 737-700 in 2008

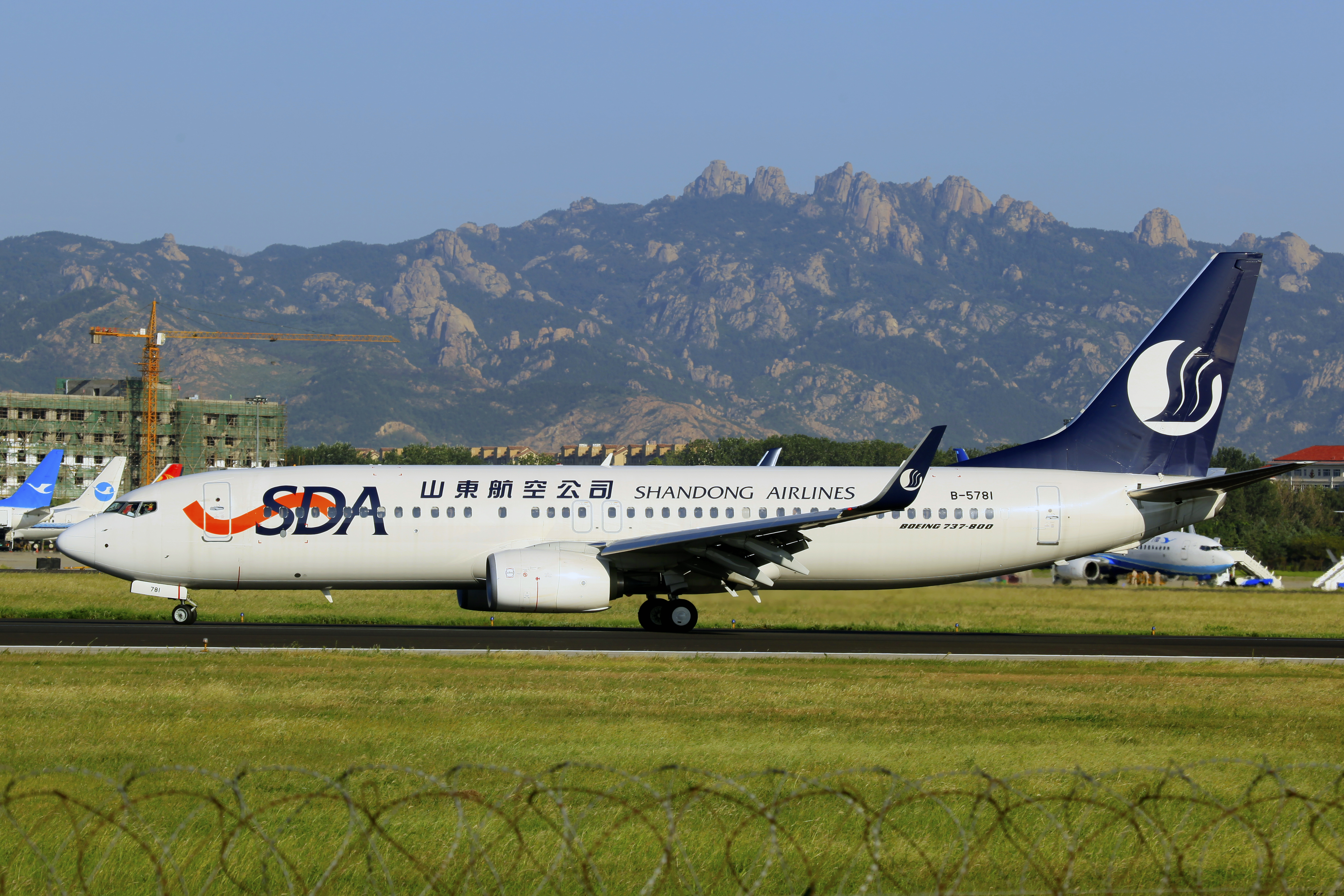
Shandong Airlines Boeing 737-800 at Qingdao Liuting Airport

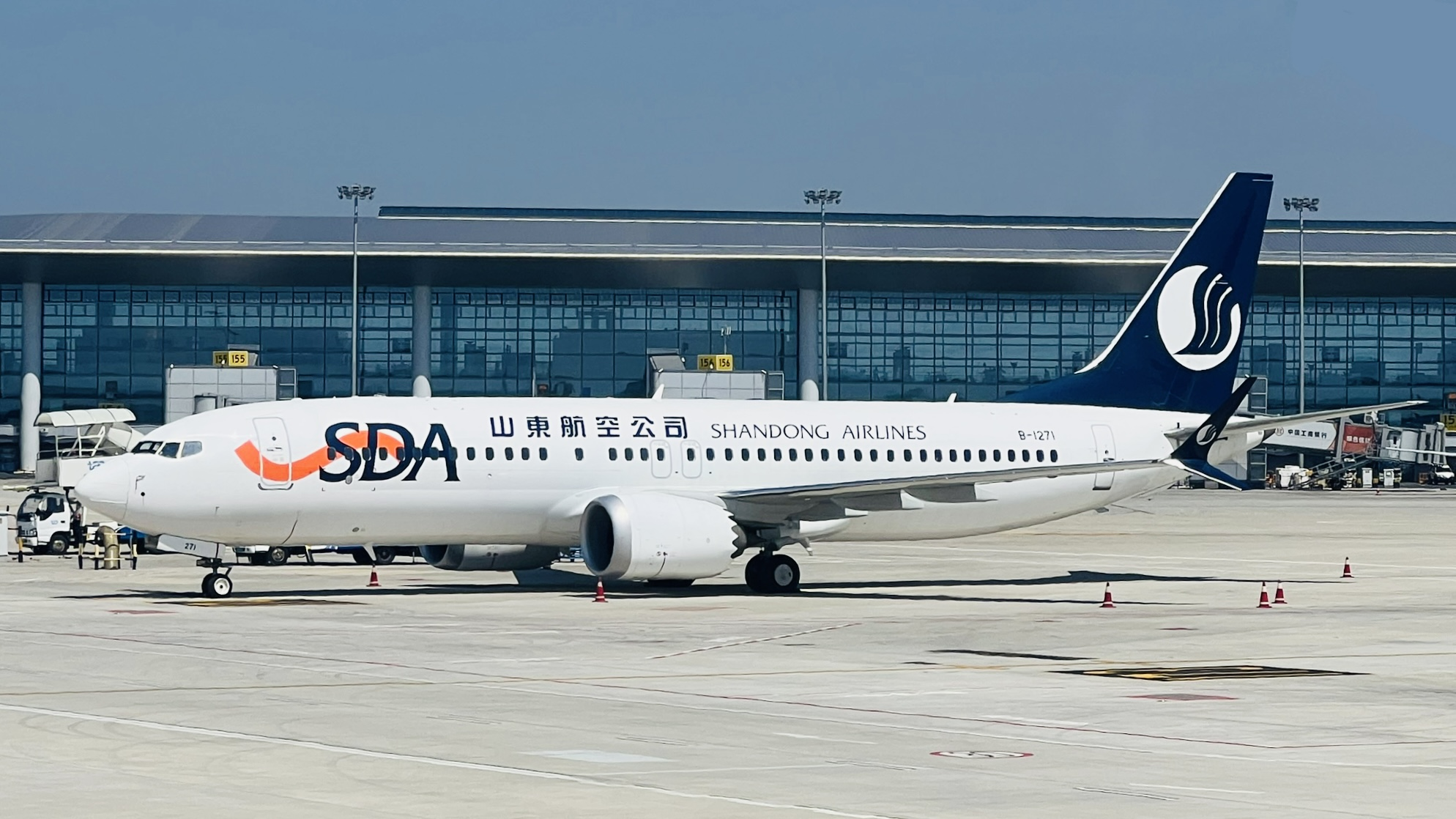
Shandong Airlines Boeing 737 MAX 8 at Qingdao Jiaodong International Airport

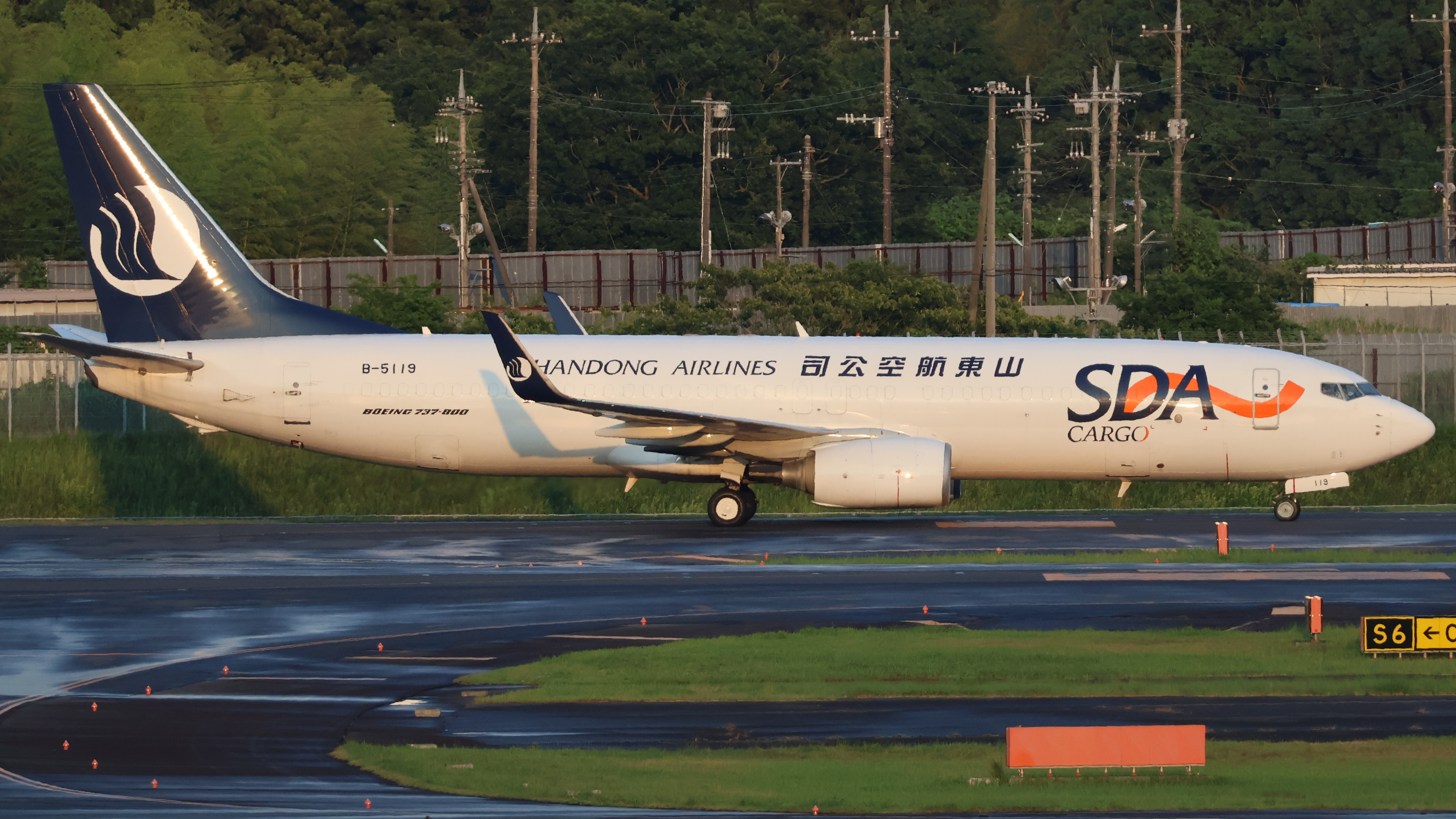
Shandong Airlines Boeing 737-800BCF at Narita International Airport

=== Former fleet ===
Aircraft	Total	Introduced	Retired	Notes
Boeing 737-300	16	1996	2014	
Bombardier Challenger 604	2	2002	2006	Operated by Rainbow Jet.
Bombardier CRJ200	12	2000	2016	
Bombardier CRJ700	2	2003	2017	
Cessna 208 Caravan	5	2001	Unknown	Operated by Rainbow Jet.
Saab 340B	8	1998	2005	
Xi'an Y-7-100	1	1994	Unknown	

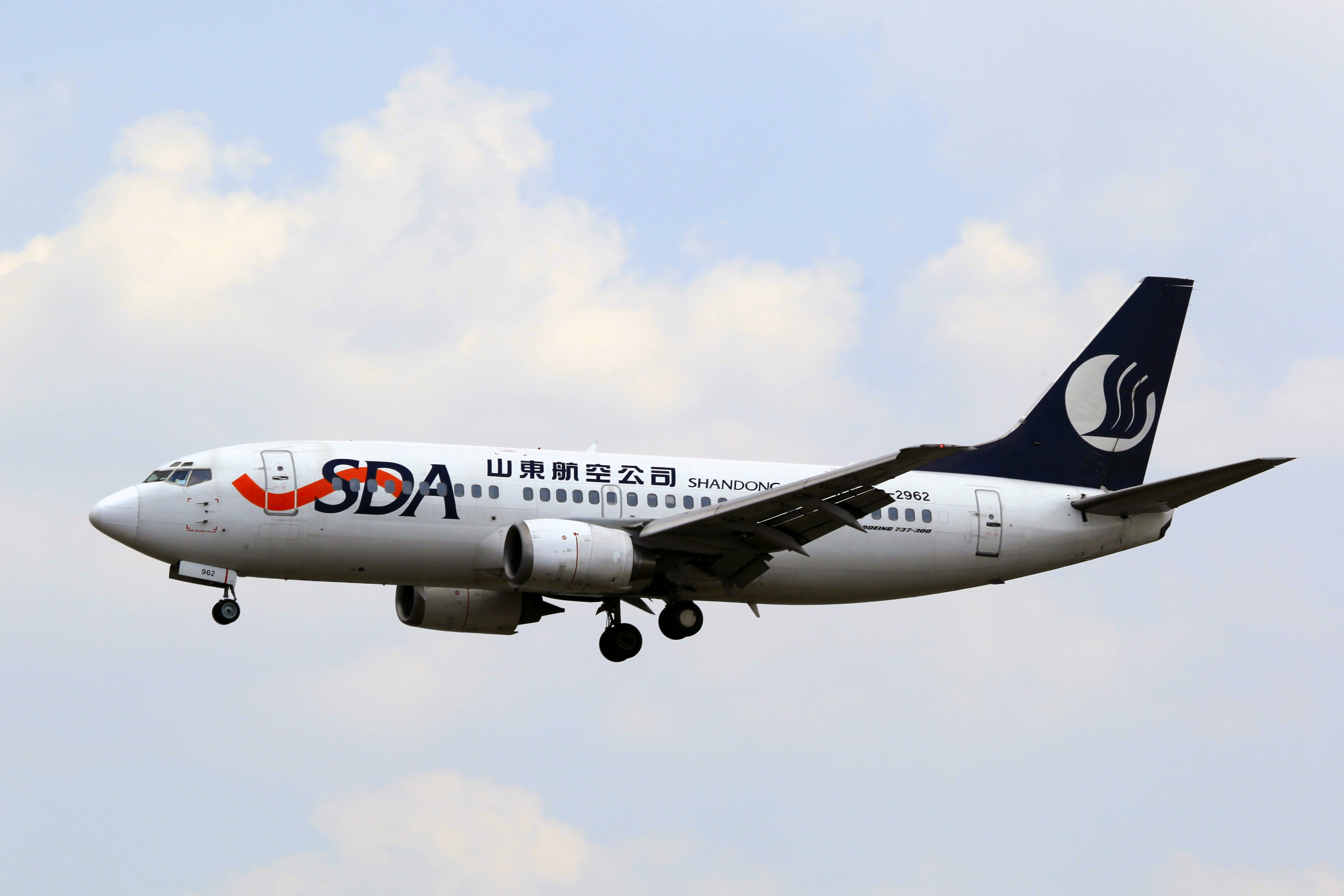
Shandong Airlines Boeing 737-300 in 2013

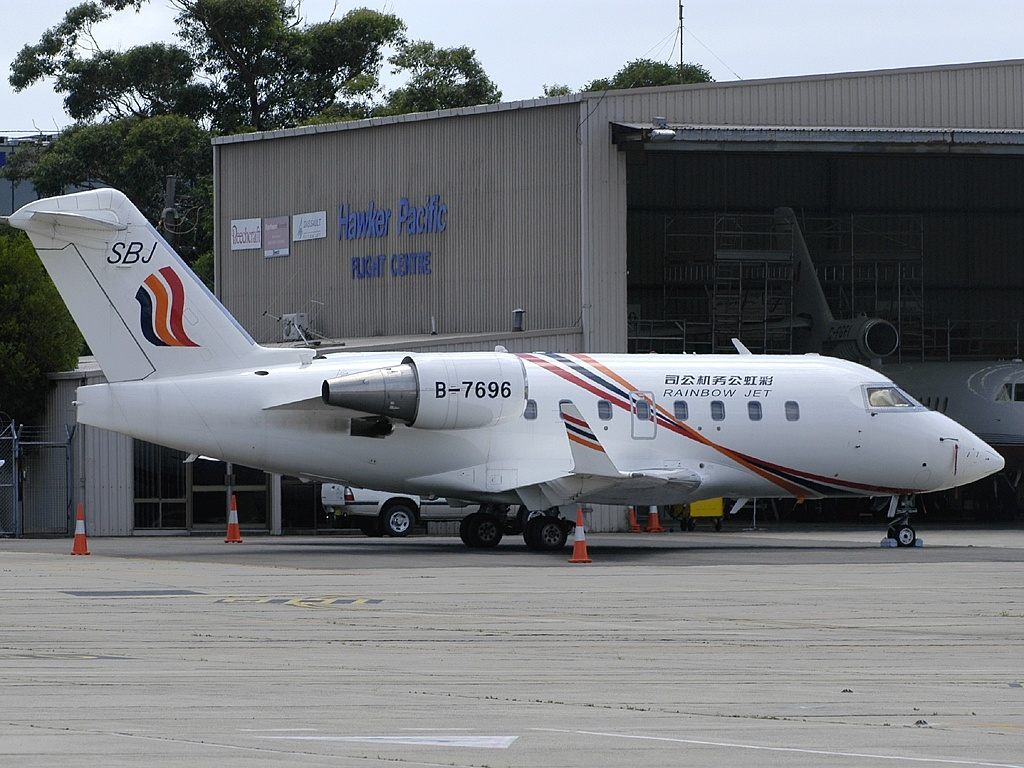
Rainbow Jet Bombardier Challenger 604 in 2004

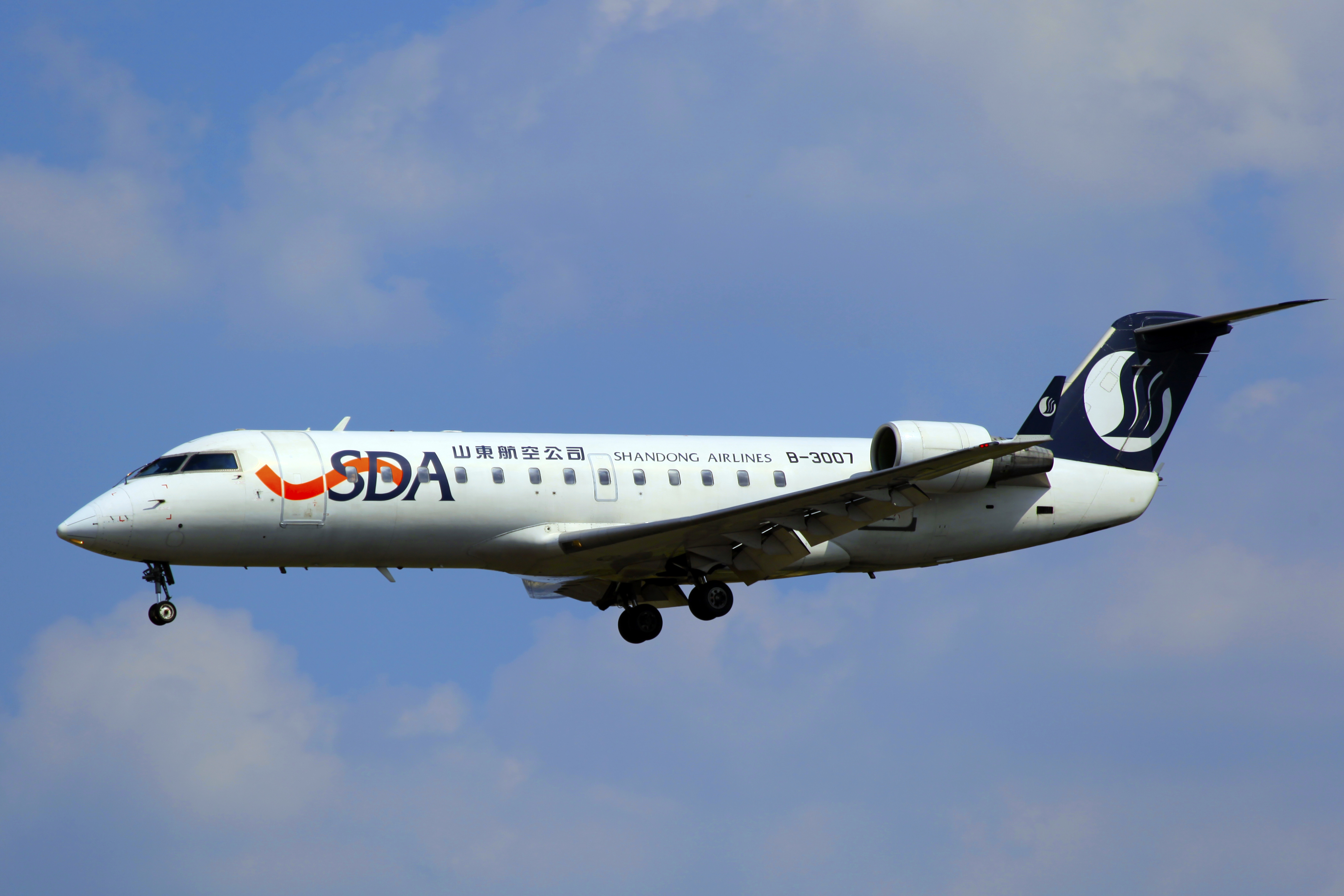
Shandong Airlines Bombardier CRJ200 in 2013

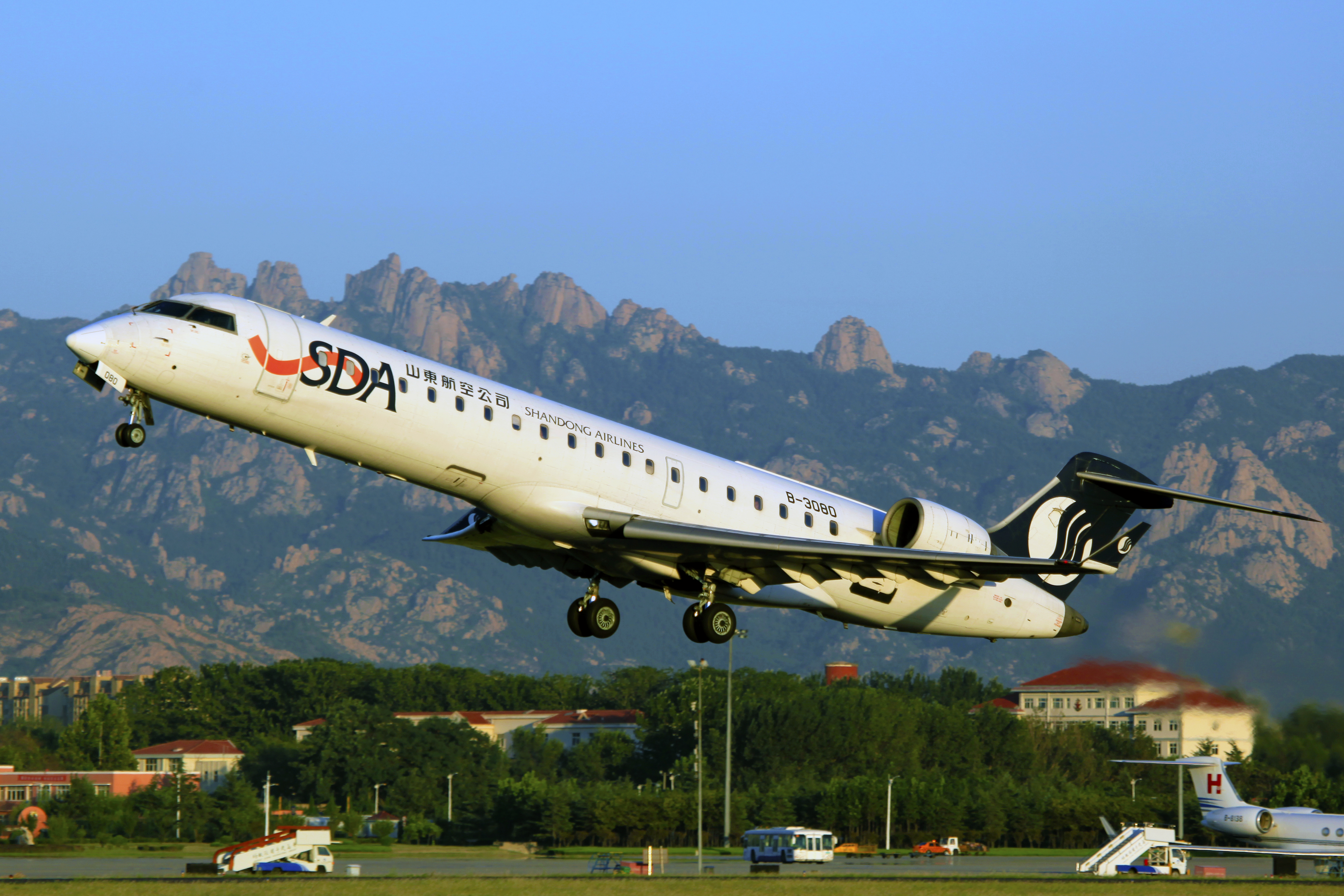
Shandong Airlines Bombardier CRJ700 in 2013
