= Taizhou Luqiao Airport =

Taizhou Luqiao Airport 台州路桥机场
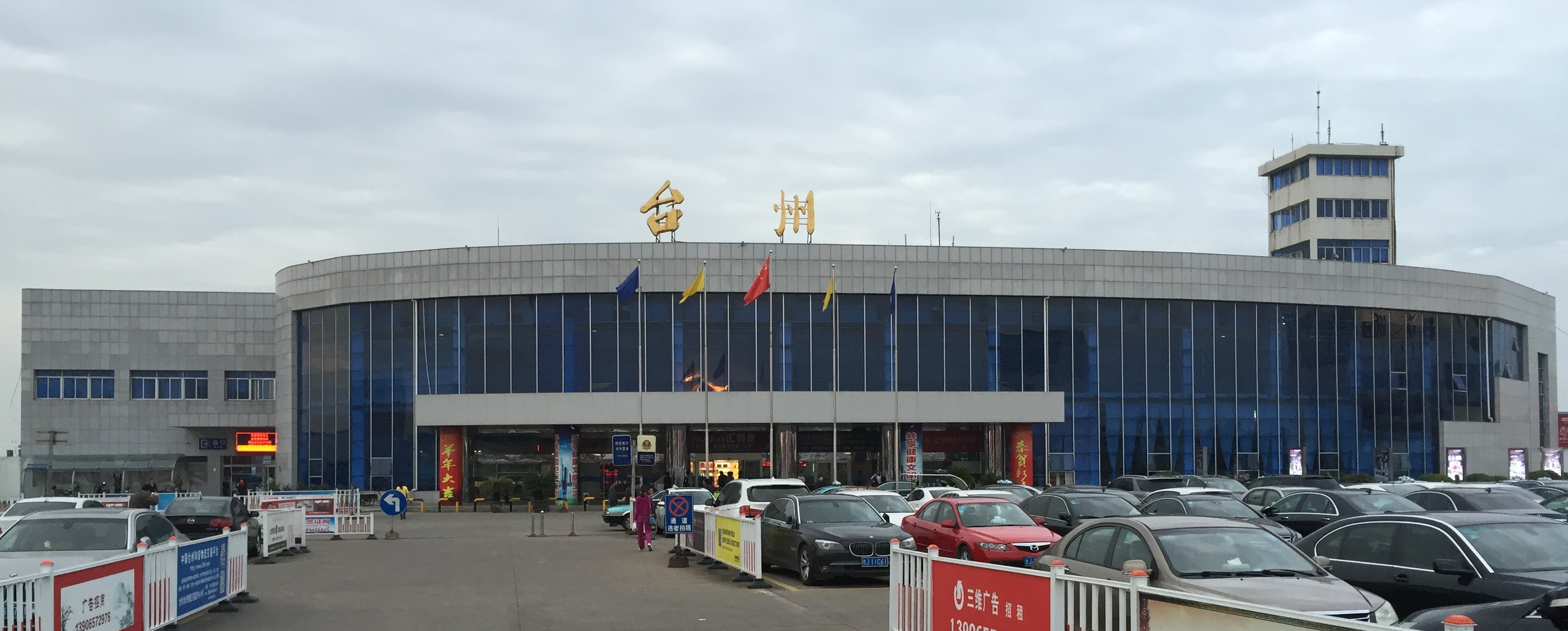
- IATA: HYN; ICAO: ZSLQ

Summary
- Airport type: Military/Public
- Operator: Taizhou Civil Aviation Administration Bureau
- Serves: Taizhou, Zhejiang
- Location: Luqiao District, Taizhou
- Coordinates: 28°33′44″N 121°25′43″E
- Website: www.tzair.com.cn

Map
- Location of airport in Zhejiang

Runways
Direction	Length		Surface
Direction	m	ft	Surface
03/21	2,500	8,202	Concrete

Statistics (2025)
- Passengers: 2,447,367
- Aircraft movements: 19,433
- Cargo (metric tons): 13,211.7

Taizhou Luqiao Airport
- Simplified Chinese: 台州路桥机场
- Traditional Chinese: 台州路橋機場
Transcriptions
Standard Mandarin
- Hanyu Pinyin: Tāizhōu Lùqiáo Jīchǎng

Taizhou Luqiao Airport (IATA: HYN, ICAO: ZSLQ), formerly Huangyan Luqiao Airport, is a dual-use military and civil airport serving the city of Taizhou in Zhejiang Province, China. It is located in Luqiao District, 20 kilometers from the city center. In 2010 the airport handled 616,861 passengers and 5,483 tons of cargo.

== History ==
Luqiao Airport was originally a military airfield belonging to the People's Liberation Army Navy. Construction of the airfield began in January 1954, and it was opened in July 1955. In 1987 the airfield was converted to a dual-use military and civil airport and was named Huangyan Luqiao Airport. In 1994 the county-level city of Huangyan was merged into the prefecture-level city of Taizhou and split into Huangyan and Luqiao districts, but the airport was only renamed Taizhou Luqiao Airport in December 2008, and its old name is still frequently used.

=== Military airfield period ===
The predecessor of Taizhou Luqiao Airport was a military airport called Luqiao Military Airport, which was constructed by the Chinese People's Liberation Army Naval Aviation in 1954 and completed in March 1955. At that time, Luqiao was an administrative town under Huangyan County of Wenzhou Prefecture. Since Wenzhou had inconvenient sea and land transportation, the People's Liberation Army built an airport in Luqiao to meet the needs of war preparedness. The completed military airport has a main runway that is 2,500 meters long and 60 meters wide, and is equipped with taxiway end safety and side safety.

=== Huangyan Luqiao Airport period ===
In 1962, Huangyan County was transferred to Taizhou Prefecture, while Luqiao remained under the jurisdiction of Huangyan County. With the application of the Taizhou Prefectural Committee, the Taizhou Prefectural Administrative Office, the Huangyan County Committee, and the Huangyan County Government to establish the Huangyan Civil Aviation Station, the Luqiao Military Airport was converted into a joint military-civilian airport in 1987. It was the first county-level joint military-civilian local airport in mainland China and was called Huangyan Luqiao Airport. In September of the same year, with the approval of the State Council and the Central Military Commission Document No. 157, Luqiao Airport was converted into a joint military-civilian airport. To meet the needs of civil transportation, the airport added a waiting room, and other civil aviation facilities were built at a separate site outside the airport area. The civil aviation station was established on October 24 of the same year. After a successful trial flight on November 18, the airport officially opened to traffic on December 2. In September of the following year, a waiting room, canteen, parking lot and water and electricity facilities were built. The newly built buildings covered an area of 548 square meters and cost 300,000 yuan. Huangyan Luqiao Airport became the first county-level civil aviation airport in the country. On October 20, the Nanjing Military Region Air Force Command of the Chinese People's Liberation Army approved the route of Luqiao Airport with document No. 399, which allows Luqiao Airport to run between Shanghai Hongqiao Airport and Hangzhou Jianqiao Airport every Wednesday, Friday and Sunday. The reason is that long-distance transportation in Huangyan is inconvenient, and more than 80% of the long-distance passenger transport destinations in the area are Hangzhou and Shanghai, with considerable traffic.

=== Taizhou Luqiao Airport period ===
Taizhou was renamed Taizhou City in 1994, and Luqiao Town was renamed Luqiao District, which was directly under the jurisdiction of Taizhou City and no longer under the jurisdiction of Huangyan. However, Huangyan Luqiao Airport continued to use this name. Until December 23, 2008, in order to implement the Civil Aviation Administration of China's "Regulations on the Use of Civil Airports", and to meet the needs of Taizhou's civil aviation development and enhance Taizhou's image, Huangyan Luqiao Airport was officially renamed "Taizhou Luqiao Airport". Therefore, from 0:00 a.m. Beijing time on that day, the arrival or departure station name of the original flights to and from Huangyan in the civil aviation departure system, ticketing system and airline network system was changed to "Taizhou".

In 2012, Taizhou Luqiao Airport underwent a maintenance project and was suspended for about four months to renovate the runway, instrument landing system, weather station, waiting hall and other facilities. It resumed operation on October 28.

On July 26, 2015, a passenger successfully carried controlled items, including lighters and knives, onto a plane at Taizhou Luqiao Airport. He then attempted to set fire to the plane and damage facilities, which was the arson incident involving Shenzhen Airlines Flight 9648. This incident exposed the security problems at Taizhou Luqiao Airport, which attracted widespread attention. As a result, the airport was ordered by the East China Regional Administration of the Civil Aviation Administration of China to suspend operations from July 29. It was later allowed to resume operations on September 6, becoming the first airport in the history of the People's Republic of China to be forcibly shut down due to security risks. In addition, the station chief, deputy station chief and all on-duty staff of the airport security checkpoint were dismissed. Media reports believe that the arson incident reflects the long-term loss-making operation of small and medium-sized airports in mainland China, and pointed out that Taizhou Luqiao Airport has been losing money for years and has been relying on government subsidies to operate.

In 2017, with the establishment of Zhejiang Provincial Airport Group, Taizhou Luqiao Airport changed from independent operation to being under the group's jurisdiction. On August 16, the Taizhou Municipal People's Government and Zhejiang Provincial Airport Group signed the "Taizhou Airport Entrusted Management Agreement", entrusting the management and operation of Taizhou Airport to Zhejiang Provincial Airport Group Co., Ltd. On November 24, Zhejiang Taizhou Airport Management Co., Ltd. was officially registered and established. On November 24, 2018, the annual passenger throughput of Taizhou Luqiao Airport exceeded one million passengers for the first time.

On December 16, 2019, Taizhou Luqiao Airport underwent a renovation and expansion project, including the construction of a new terminal building of 35,000 square meters, the construction of a new parallel taxiway and connecting taxiways at both ends, the construction of a new terminal building and 16 parking stands, as well as air traffic control towers and other supporting facilities, and the independent operation of military and civil aviation. The total investment was estimated at RMB 3.643 billion. The Taizhou Airport renovation and expansion project became the first military-civilian airport project approved by the Central Military Commission after the military reform. After the expansion, Taizhou Airport will be the first airport in the country where military and civil aviation operate independently on both sides of the runway. On August 20 and 21, 2024, the Taizhou Luqiao Airport renovation and expansion project (first batch) passed the industry acceptance of the Civil Aviation Administration of East China. On October 15, 2024, the established goal of debugging all single aircraft was successfully achieved. On December 26, 2024, it was officially transferred to operation.

== Facilities ==
The airport has one runway that is 2,500 meters long and 60 meters wide, and a 7,850-square-meter terminal building. It is designed to handle 600,000 passengers per year.

== Proposed new airport ==
To handle the growing traffic volume, a new dedicated civil airport is being planned to replace Luqiao Airport, with an estimated total investment of 800 million to 1 billion yuan. When built the new airport will have a handling capacity of 2.5 million passengers annually.

== Airlines and destinations ==
The following airlines serve Taizhou Luqiao Airport:

Airlines	Destinations
Air China	Beijing–Capital, Beijing–Daxing
Beijing Capital Airlines	Haikou, Shijiazhuang
Chengdu Airlines	Chengdu–Shuangliu, Wuhan
China Eastern Airlines	Chengdu–Tianfu, Enshi, Guangzhou, Kunming, Wuhan
China Express Airlines	Chongqing, Jingzhou, Xuzhou
China Southern Airlines	Guangzhou, Guiyang, Jieyang
China United Airlines	Foshan
Chongqing Airlines	Changsha, Chongqing, Shenzhen
Colorful Guizhou Airlines	Chengdu–Tianfu, Guiyang, Libo, Yibin
Donghai Airlines	Tianjin, Zhuhai
Fuzhou Airlines	Harbin, Sanya
Qingdao Airlines	Changchun, Nanning, Qingdao
Shandong Airlines	Haikou, Jinan
Shenzhen Airlines	Guangzhou, Shenzhen
Tianjin Airlines	Tianjin, Xi'an, Yancheng

== See also ==
- List of airports in China
- List of the busiest airports in China
- List of People's Liberation Army Air Force airbases
