= Xi'an Y-7 =

Chinese turboprop transport aircraft

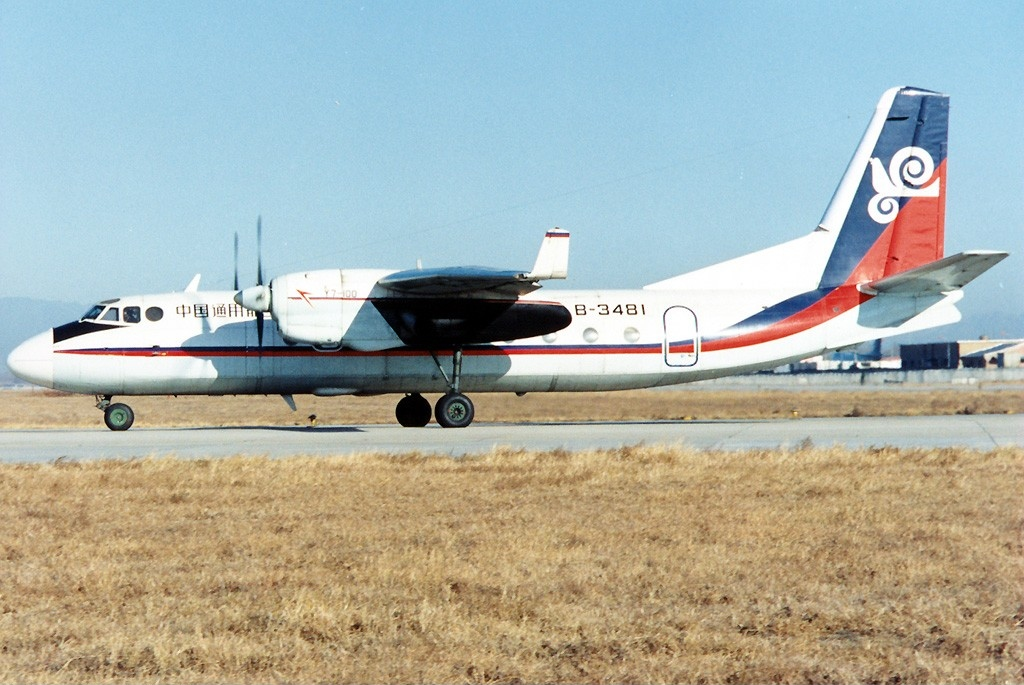
- A Y-7-100 of China General Aviation

General information
- Type: Regional airliner / military transport
- National origin: China
- Manufacturer: Xi'an Aircraft Industrial Corporation
- Status: In military service, in production
- Primary users: People's Liberation Army Air Force People's Liberation Army Navy Air Force; People's Liberation Army Ground Force Aviation
- Number built: 200+

History
- Manufactured: 1977-present
- First flight: 20 February 1984
- Developed from: Antonov An-24; Antonov An-26
- Developed into: Xi'an MA60

The Xi'an Y-7 or Yunshuji Y-7 (Chinese: 运-7; pinyin: Yùn-qī) (Note: Also transliterated in English-language sources as the Xian Y-7.) is a twin turboprop transport/passenger aircraft built in China. It is a license-produced version of the Soviet-designed Antonov An-24 family.

== Development ==
China imported the Antonov An-24 from early in its production run and also negotiated licenses for production of the aircraft and its engines. In 1966, Xi'an aircraft factory started the project of local production of An-24. The first Chinese-assembled An-24T had its maiden flight on 25 December 1970.

Production was launched in 1977 at the Xi'an aircraft factory but progress was slow due to the deleterious effects of the Cultural Revolution, with a pre-production aircraft displayed to the public at Nanyuan air base, near Beijing, on 17 April 1982. The WJ-5A1 turboprop engine was chosen as the Y-7's power source. The first production aircraft was not flown until February 1984, illustrating the slow progress (eighteen years from license to production).

The Chinese aircraft equated to the An-24RV, having a full complement of windows and the booster jet engine. The majority of early deliveries were to the People's Liberation Army Air Force (PLAAF), mostly as transports, with a few in 52-seat airliner configuration for the Civil Aviation Administration of China (CAAC). After the initial licensed production run, the Y-7 was developed separately from the An-24 with a succession of upgrades culminating in the Xi'an MA60 (Modern Ark) series.

A tactical transport derivative was copied, unlicensed, from the Antonov An-26 and emerged as the Y-7H, incorporating the cargo ramp door and military equipment of the An-26.

== Variants ==
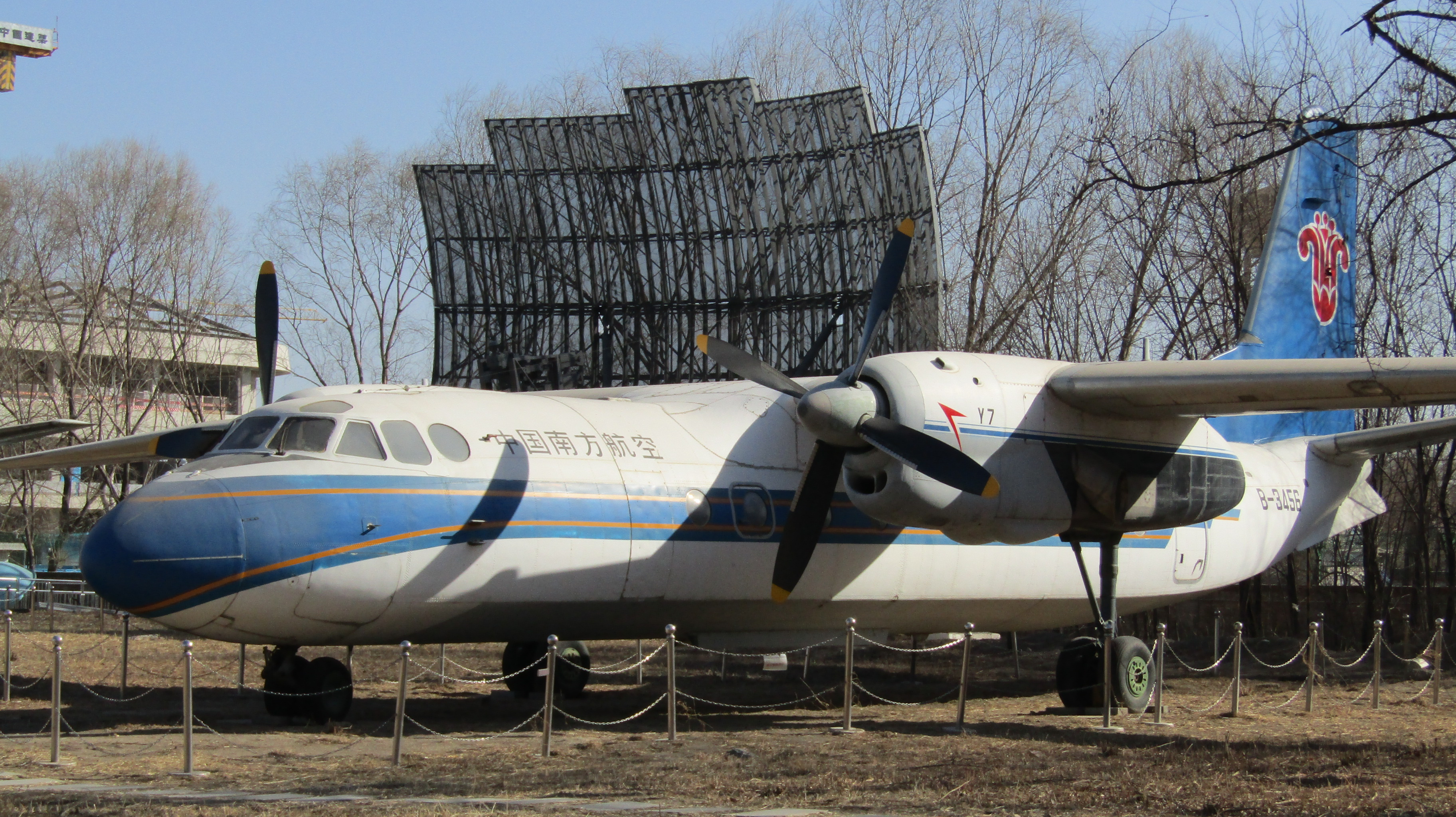
A Xi'an Y-7 at the Beijing Civil Aviation Museum

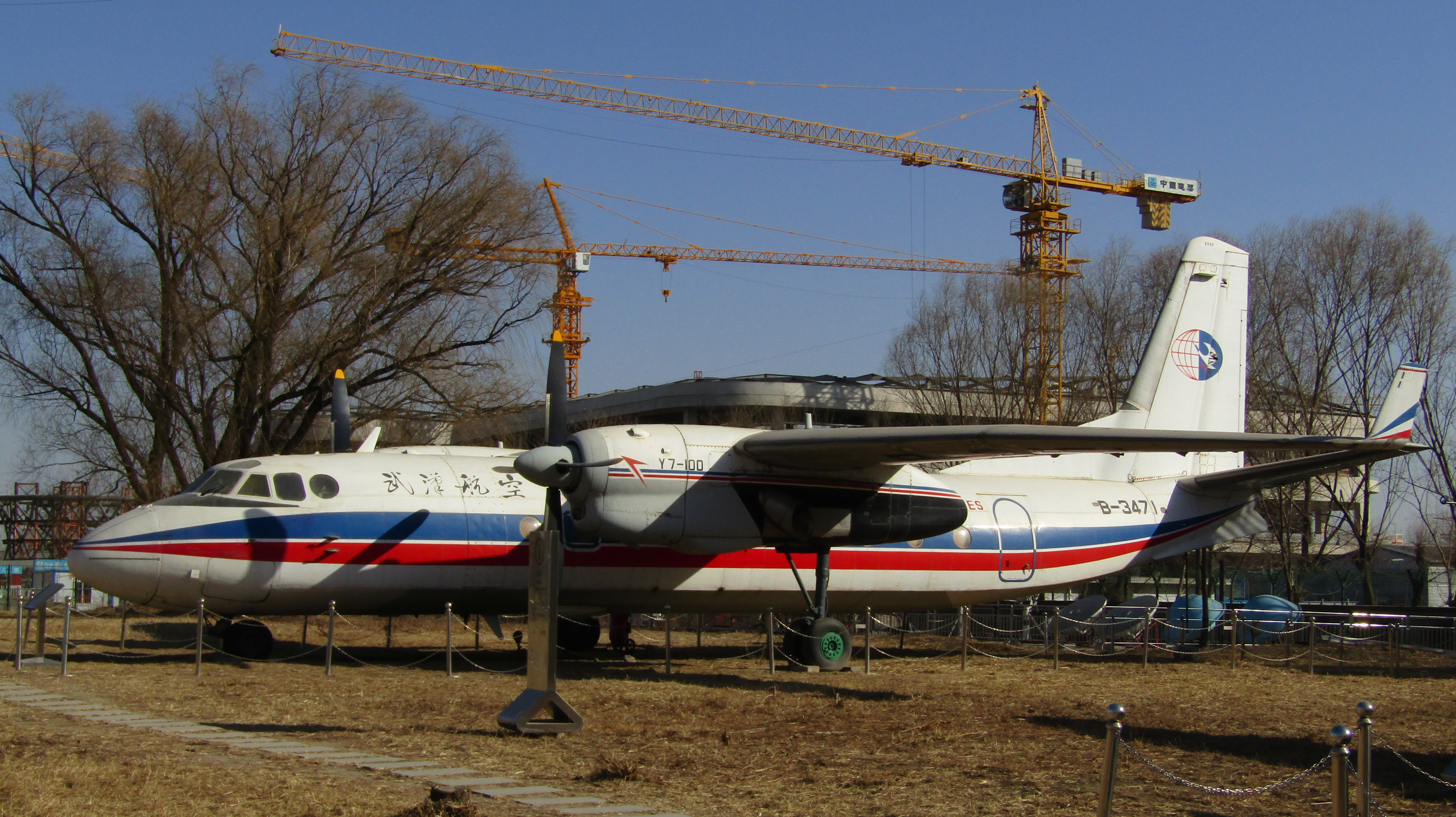
A Xi'an Y-7-100 at the Beijing Civil Aviation Museum

Xi'an Y-7E

Speculative designation for a 'Hot and High" version with more powerful engines.

Xi'an Y-7G
A military variant of the MA60 produced for the PLAAF.
Xi'an Y-7H
(Huo -cargo) A reverse-engineered An-26 with rear loading ramp for the PLAAF, entering production in 1992.
Xi'an Y-7H-500
Civil variant of the Y-7H certified in 1994.
Xi'an Y-14
The original designation for the An-26 copy/Y-7H.
Xi'an Y-7-100
Improved version, developed in co-operation with HAECO (Hong Kong Aircraft Engineering Company), with redesigned cockpit and cabin, as well as winglets. This variation has an upgraded passenger cabin interior, with new avionics sourced from western providers. Flight crew reduced to three, it is capable of carrying 52 passengers.
Xi'an Y-7-100C1
Five-crew variant with equipment changes.
Xi'an Y-7-100C2
Five-crew variant with equipment changes.
Xi'an Y-7-100C3
Five-crew variant with equipment changes.
Xi'an Y-7-200
Fitted with new avionics; without winglets.
Xi'an Y-7-200A
Powered by two Pratt & Whitney PW127C turboprop engines.
Xi'an Y-7-200B
Stretched version (74cm (29in)) with WJ5A-1G engines, built for the Chinese domestic market.
Xi'an HYJ-7
(Hongzhaji Yunshuji Jiaolianji - Bomber/transport/trainer) A pilot and crew trainer for H-6 heavy bombers fitted with a stabilized HM-1A bombsight, bomb-aiming radar and a TNL-7880 combined navigation system.
Xi'an MA60
(Y-7-MA60) (Modern Ark 60 seats) A westernized variant of the Y-7 intended to attract more western customers and meet Joint Airworthiness Requirements.
Xi'an JZY-01 / Y-7 AWACS
Carrier-based airborne early warning and control (AEW&C) variant. JZY stands for Jian (舰) Zai (载) Yu (预), meaning carrier borne AEW&C, has 4 rudders like E-2 AEW. It is being used as a testbed for the Xi'an KJ-600.

== Operators ==
Current operators
China

- People's Liberation Army Air Force
- People's Liberation Army Ground Force Aviation
- People's Liberation Army Naval Air Force

Former operators

Cambodia

- Phnom Penh Airways
- President Airlines

Iran

- Islamic Republic of Iran Air Force

Laos

- Lao Airlines - 4 in service
- Lao People's Liberation Army Air Force

Mauritania

- Mauritanian Air Force

China

- Air Changan
- Air China
- China Eastern Airlines
- China General Aviation
- China Great Wall Airlines
- China Northern Airlines
- China Southern Airlines
- Civil Aviation Flight University of China
- People's Liberation Army Air Force
- Shanxi Airlines
- Sichuan Airlines
- Wuhan Airlines
- Zhongyuan Airlines

Zimbabwe

- Air Zimbabwe

== Accidents and incidents ==
22 June 2000
Wuhan Airlines Flight 343 was struck by lightning and crashed near Sitai, Yongfeng, killing all 42 on board and another seven on the ground. This crash is the worst ever accident involving the Y-7.
19 October 2006
A People's Liberation Army Air Force Y-7 crashed into a wheat field near Hengshui, killing two.

== Specifications (Y-7-100) ==
Data from Chinese Aircraft:China's aviation industry since 1951

General characteristics

- Crew: 3
- Capacity: 52 passengers max
- Length: 24.218 m (79 ft 5 in)
- Wingspan: 29.666 m (97 ft 4 in)
- Height: 8.553 m (28 ft 1 in)
- Wing area: 75.26 m^{2} (810.1 sq ft)
- Aspect ratio: 11.69
- Airfoil: root: TsAGI S-5-18; tip: TsAGI S-3-13
- Empty weight: 14,988 kg (33,043 lb) operating weight empty
- Max zero-fuel weight: 19,655 kg (43,332 lb)
- Max takeoff weight: 21,800 kg (48,061 lb)
- Max landing weight: 21,800 kg (48,061 lb)
- Powerplant: 2 × Dongan WJ-5A turboprop engines, 1,800 kW (2,400 shp) each equivalent
- Propellers: 4-bladed constant-speed feathering propellers, 3.9 m (12 ft 10 in) diameter

Performance

- Maximum speed: 503 km/h (313 mph, 272 kn)
- Cruise speed: 423 km/h (263 mph, 228 kn) at 6,000 m (20,000 ft)
- Range: 910 km (570 mi, 490 nmi) maximum payload

1,982 km (1,232 mi; 1,070 nmi) with max fuel

- Service ceiling: 8,750 m (28,700 ft)
- Take-off run: 640 m (2,100 ft) at MTOW
- Landing run: 645 m (2,116 ft) at MLW
