= Hankow Airfield =

Former airport of Wuhan, Hubei, China (1931–2007)

Wuhan Wangjiadun Airport 武汉王家墩机场
- IATA: WJD; ICAO: ZHWT

Summary
- Airport type: Defunct
- Serves: Wuhan
- Location: Jianghan District, Hankou, Hubei, China
- Opened: 1931
- Closed: 25 December 2007
- Coordinates: 30°36′00″N 114°14′30″E
- Interactive map of Wuhan Wangjiadun Airport

Runways
Direction	Length		Surface
Direction	ft	m	Surface
04/22			Concrete (Closed)

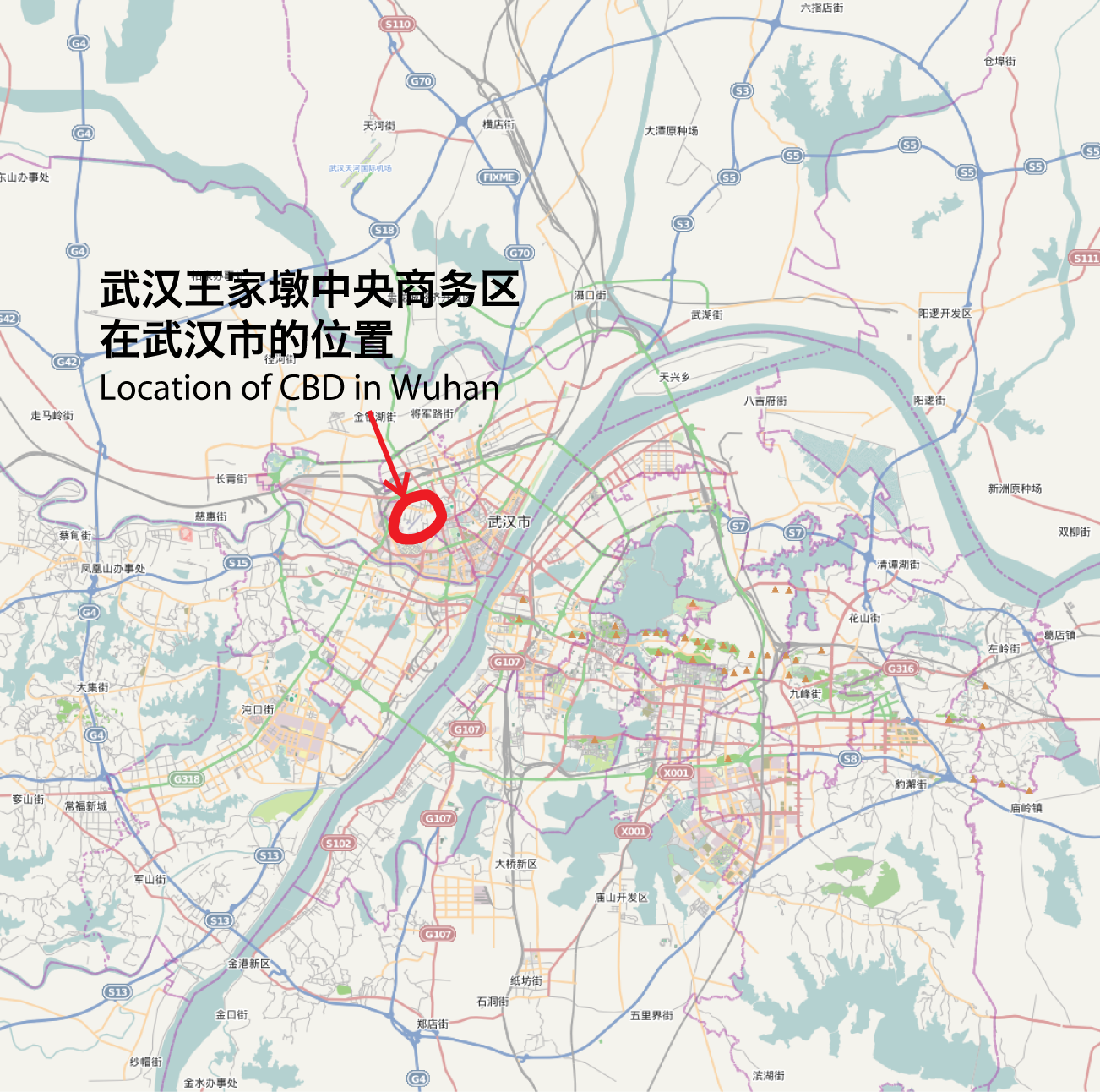
Location of Wuhan Central Business District in Wuhan, of which the Hankow Airfield was located.

Location of Hankow Airfield, China

Wuhan Wangjiadun Airport (Chinese: 武汉王家墩机场) (IATA: WJD, ICAO: ZHWT), also known as Hankow Airfield, was an airfield in Wangjiadun, Hankou (Hankow), Hubei, China that closed in 2007. Constructed in 1931, it was a busy military airfield during the Second Sino-Japanese War in WWII, used by both the Chinese and her American allies, the USAAF Fourteenth Air Force. From 1950, the military airfield was managed by the People's Liberation Army Air Force. From the mid 1980s to 2007, it was also a civil airfield. It was demolished in 2007 and transformed into the Wuhan Central Business District. The former site is near the junction of Huaihai Road (淮海路) and Yunfei Road (云飞路), Wangjiadun neighborhood (王家墩), Wuhan. (30.601138, 114.244264)

== Accidents ==
- Wuhan Airlines Flight 343, 2000
