= Enshi Xujiaping International Airport =

Enshi Xujiaping International Airport 恩施许家坪国际机场
- IATA: ENH; ICAO: ZHES

Summary
- Airport type: Public
- Serves: Enshi City, Hubei
- Coordinates: 30°19′13″N 109°29′6″E

Map
- Location in Hubei ENH/ZHES (China)

Runways
Direction	Length		Surface
Direction	m	ft	Surface
01/19	2,100	6,890	Paved

Statistics (2025)
- Passengers: 1,947,626
- Aircraft movements: 16,650
- Cargo (metric tons): 2,492.0

Enshi Xujiaping International Airport
- Simplified Chinese: 恩施许家坪国际机场
- Traditional Chinese: 恩施許家坪國際機場
Transcriptions
Standard Mandarin
- Hanyu Pinyin: Ēnshī Xǔjiāpíng Guójì Jīchǎng

Enshi Xujiaping International Airport (IATA: ENH, ICAO: ZHES) is an airport serving Enshi City, Hubei province, China.

The airport is located in the valley of the Qing River, a few kilometers north of the downtown Enshi City.

== History ==
The history of Enshi Xujiaping International Airport can be traced back to the Enshi Airport, which was a military airport built by the Nationalist government.

=== Enshi Airport ===
Originally built in 1933, Enshi Airport is located at the northern end of the old city of Enshi, bordering the Qingjiang River to the east. It was originally a military airport. It was one of the earliest two air routes in Hubei Province.

In August 1935, the runway was extended, and a hangar was excavated in Houshanwan. In 1940, the runway was further expanded to 1300-1400 meters long and 300-350 meters wide, capable of handling fighter jets and bombers. A mixed Chinese, American, and Soviet flight squadron was stationed at the airport. In November 1949, it was taken over by the People's Liberation Army. On August 1, 1958, it began operation in conjunction with Wuchang Nanhu Airport.

=== Enshi Xujiaping Airport ===
In December 1986, Enshi Airport announced the relocation to Xujiaping, Enshi and construction began shortly afterward. On November 28, 1993, the newly built Enshi Xujiaping Airport was put into operation, and the old airport was decommissioned.

Enshi Xujiaping Airport underwent two expansions in 2003 and 2010. The first phase of expansion in 2003 was designed for an annual passenger throughput of 200,000, with a total investment of 84.7 million yuan. The second phase of expansion in 2010 was designed for a passenger throughput of 1.5 million, a cargo throughput of 2,500 tons, and 17,000 takeoffs and landings by 2020, with a total investment of 200 million yuan. It was completed and put into operation on August 9, 2013. The two expansions brought the total area of the airport to 1,500 mu (approximately 100 hectares), with a 10,000-square-meter domestic terminal and a 5,318.8-square-meter international terminal, a runway of 2,010 meters, and a total apron area of 7,000 square meters. The expansions also upgraded the airport to 4C class, and made it an important feeder airport in the Wuling Mountains region.

In 2018, in order to meet the requirements of the central government to obtain temporary permits for international flights, the local government invested in converting Terminal 1 into an international terminal. In June 2019, the National Port Authority approved the temporary opening of international flights at Enshi Xujiaping Airport, making it the third civilian airport in Hubei Province to operate international flights. Following the granting of temporary permission for international flights, the airport launched international routes to Macau, Siem Reap (Cambodia), Da Nang (Vietnam), Pattaya (Thailand), and Ho Chi Minh City (Vietnam). In 2019, the airport handled 95 international flights (190 flights) and 27,600 passengers.

In 2022, Enshi Airport operated 18 domestic routes to 21 destinations, handling 586,000 passengers, 7,097 flights, and 548 tons of cargo.

=== International status ===
On March 7, 2025, the Civil Aviation Administration of China approved the renaming of Enshi Xujiaping Airport to Enshi Xujiaping International Airport. This marks the airport's entry into the ranks of international airports, becoming the fourth airport in the province to gain international status.

== Airlines and destinations ==
Airlines	Destinations
Air Guilin	Zhengzhou
Beijing Capital Airlines	Haikou, Hangzhou, Nanjing, Nanning, Qingdao, Xi'an
China Eastern Airlines	Beijing–Daxing, Guiyang, Nanchang, Shanghai–Hongqiao, Taizhou, Wenzhou, Wuhan, Yinchuan
China Southern Airlines	Guangzhou, Wuhan
Greater Bay Airlines	Hong Kong
Loong Air	Guangzhou, Hangzhou, Lanzhou, Ningbo, Shenzhen, Xi'an, Xining
Ruili Airlines	Kunming, Tianjin
Spring Airlines	Chengdu–Tianfu, Hong Kong, Jinan, Shanghai–Pudong
Thai AirAsia	Charter: Bangkok–Don Mueang
West Air	Hanoi

== See also ==
- List of airports in China
