= Changchun Longjia International Airport =

Commercial airport in Jilin, China

Changchun Longjia International Airport 长春龙嘉国际机场
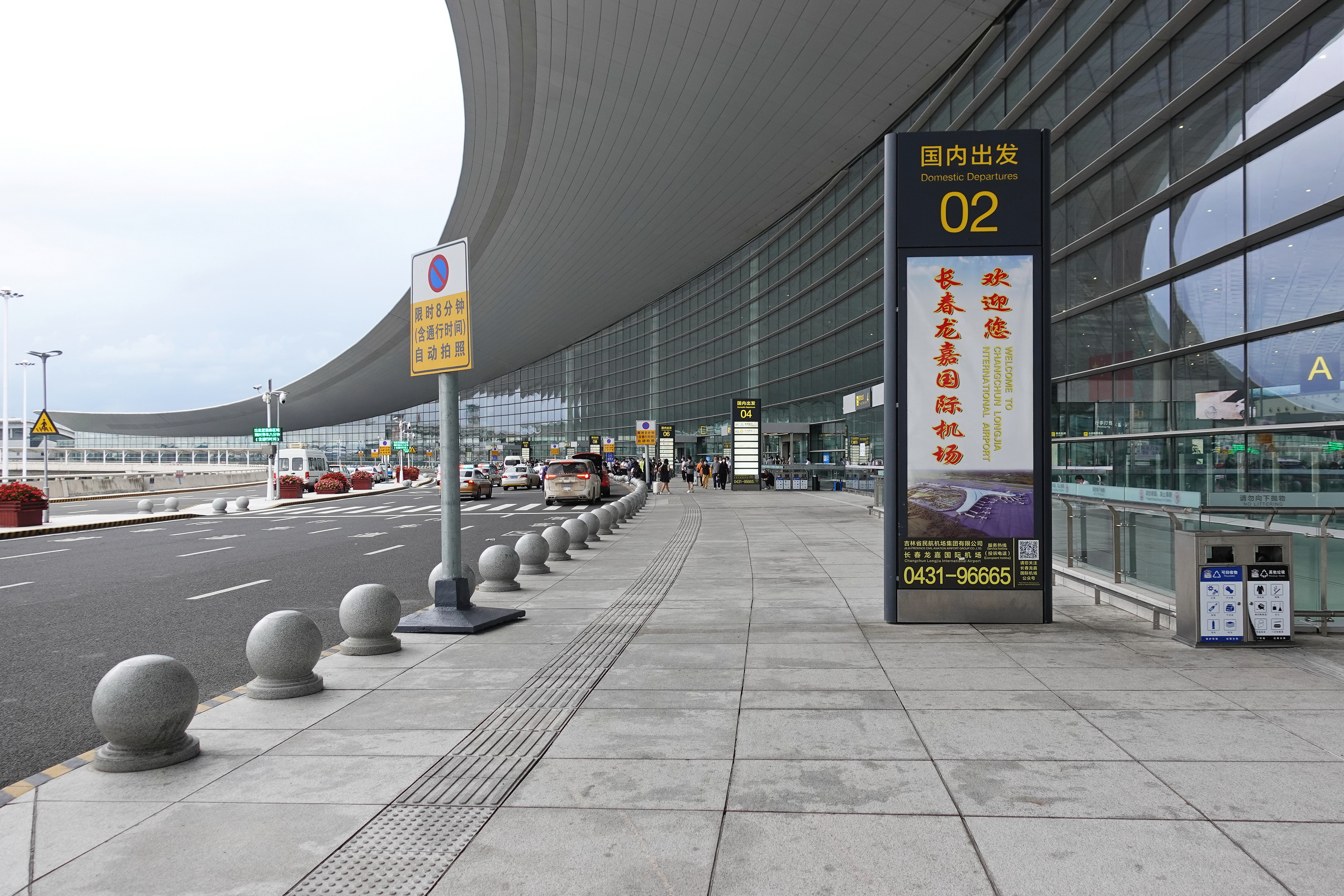
- IATA: CGQ; ICAO: ZYCC

Summary
- Airport type: Public
- Owner: Jilin Province Civil Aviation Group
- Operator: Capital Airport Holding
- Serves: Changchun; Jilin City
- Location: Longjia, Jiutai District, Changchun, Jilin, China
- Opened: 27 August 2005; 21 years ago
- Hub for: China Southern Airlines
- Elevation AMSL: 215 m (705 ft)
- Coordinates: 43°59′46″N 125°41′07″E
- Website: www.jlairports.com

Maps
- CAAC airport chart
- Location in Jilin Location in China

Runways
Direction	Length		Surface
Direction	m	ft	Surface
06/24	3,200	10,499	Concrete

Statistics (2025)
- Passengers: 17,759,299
- Aircraft movements: 118,125
- Cargo (in tons): 106,502.2

Changchun Longjia International Airport
- Simplified Chinese: 长春龙嘉国际机场
- Traditional Chinese: 長春龍嘉國際機場
Transcriptions
Standard Mandarin
- Hanyu Pinyin: Chángchūn Lóngjiā Guójì Jīcháng

Changchun Longjia International Airport (IATA: CGQ, ICAO: ZYCC) is an international airport serving Changchun, the capital of Northeast China's Jilin province, for which it is an aviation hub in China's Civil Airport System. The airport is 31.2 km (19.4 mi) northeast of the provincial capital Changchun and 76 km (47 mi) northwest of Jilin City: responsibility for the operation of the airport is shared by both cities. Changchun Airport is a regional hub for China Southern Airlines.

== History ==
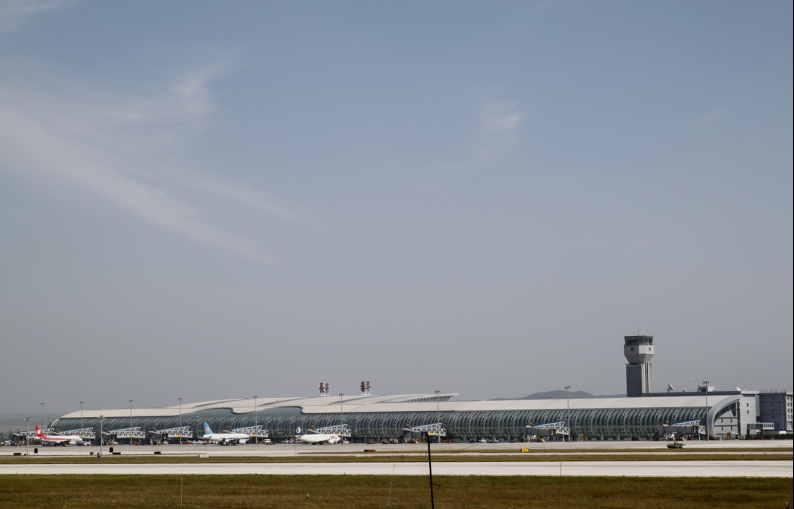
Changchun Longjia Airport T1

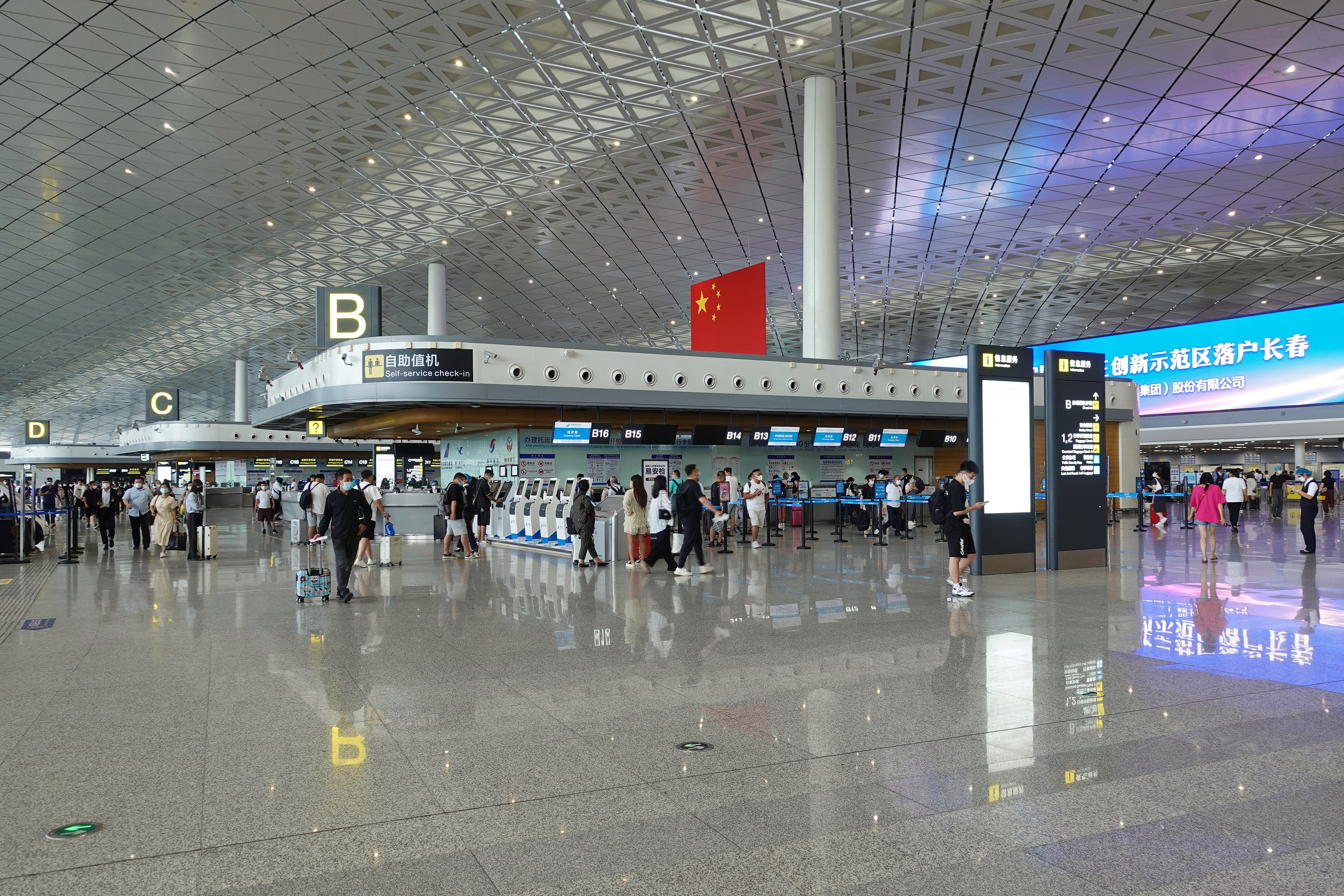
Changchun Longjia Airport T2

Longjia International Airport was approved for construction in 1998. Construction started on 29 May 2003, and the airport began its operations on 27 August 2005. It is named after Longjia (龙嘉), the town where it is located. It replaced the dual-use civil and military Changchun Dafangshen Airport, which reverted to sole military use.

The airport was later expanded, beginning in 2009 and finishing construction in May 2011. The construction added two more gates with air bridges to the international section of the terminal, and enlarged the apron to the airport. Afterward, the airport was able to accommodate long-distance wide-body jets such as the Boeing 747. The terminal, after its expansion encompasses 73,300 m^{2} (789,000 sq ft). of space. It was predicted that by 2015, the airport would be able to handle 6.5 million passengers per year. As in the year 2013, Changchun Airport received a passenger flow of 6.7 million, making it the 30th busiest airport in Mainland China.

The airport serves most major cities in China and East Asia, with scheduled international flights to Bangkok, Seoul, Singapore, Tokyo, Osaka, Hong Kong, and so on. In 2021, it gained direct access to Europe when Air China started flights to Frankfurt. It is one of the major international gateways in North-eastern China.

== Airlines and destinations ==
=== Passenger ===
Airlines	Destinations
9 Air	Guangzhou, Lianyungang, Ningbo
Air China	Hohhot
Asiana Airlines	Seoul–Incheon
Beijing Capital Airlines	Guangzhou, Qingdao, Shijiazhuang, Taiyuan, Xi'an
Chengdu Airlines	Changsha, Vladivostok, Xishuangbanna
China Eastern Airlines	Chengdu–Tianfu, Datong, Hangzhou, Hohhot, Jinan, Lanzhou, Lianyungang, Linyi, Nanchang, Shanghai–Hongqiao
China Express Airlines	Xi'an, Yulin (Shaanxi)
China Southern Airlines	Beijing–Daxing, Chengdu–Tianfu, Hohhot, Jieyang, Nanning, Wuhan, Yiwu, Zhengzhou, Zhuhai
Chongqing Airlines	Chongqing, Wuhan
Donghai Airlines	Nantong, Zhoushan
Fuzhou Airlines	Changzhi, Fuzhou, Hailar, Huai'an
Genghis Khan Airlines	Ulanhot
Hainan Airlines	Ningbo, Sanya, Shenzhen, Wuhan
Juneyao Air	Huizhou, Nanjing, Wuxi
LJ Air	Ordos, Sanya
Loong Air	Changsha, Chongqing, Guangzhou, Haikou, Hangzhou, Heze, Hong Kong, Jiaxing, Jinan, Kunming, Linyi, Nanjing, Ningbo, Shenzhen, Weihai, Wuhan, Xiangyang, Xishuangbanna, Xuzhou
Lucky Air	Huai'an, Kunming
Okay Airways	Sanya, Shenzhen, Shijiazhuang, Tianjin, Yangzhou
Qingdao Airlines	Changzhou, Chongqing, Fuzhou, Guiyang, Haikou, Hefei, Jinan, Nanjing, Nanning, Sanya, Shijiazhuang, Taizhou, Tianjin, Weifang, Xishuangbanna, Yantai, Zhengzhou
Ruili Airlines	Kunming, Yantai
Shandong Airlines	Chongqing, Jinan, Tianjin, Yantai, Zhuhai
Shanghai Airlines	Bangkok–Suvarnabhumi, Bozhou, Changsha, Fuzhou, Guilin, Guiyang, Hefei, Huai'an, Jieyang, Kuala Lumpur–International, Kunming, Liuzhou, Nanjing, Ningbo, Ordos, Weihai, Yuncheng, Zhengzhou
Shenzhen Airlines	Changzhou, Hefei, Nanning, Nantong, Quanzhou
Sichuan Airlines	Chengdu–Tianfu, Kunming, Linfen, Yancheng, Zhengzhou
Spring Airlines	Hohhot, Jieyang, Lanzhou, Yangzhou, Zhengzhou
XiamenAir	Fuzhou, Jinan, Nantong, Qingdao, Quanzhou, Shenzhen, Yuncheng
Xizang Airlines	Lhasa, Xi'an

== Ground transport ==
Changchun Longjia is serviced by the Longjia railway station, a railway station of the Changchun–Jilin intercity railway located at the basement of the terminal. The airport is also serviced by coaches, which ferry passengers to and from Quan'an Square (also known as Nanguan Urban Terminal), Renmin Square, and Weixing Square in Changchun, and Jiangcheng Square in Jilin. Coach services to Changchun are available every day, from the first takeoff to the last arrival.

The planned Line 9 of Changchun Rail Transit will also stop here.

== See also ==
- List of airports in China
