= Dehong Mangshi International Airport =

Dehong Mangshi International Airport 德宏芒市国际机场
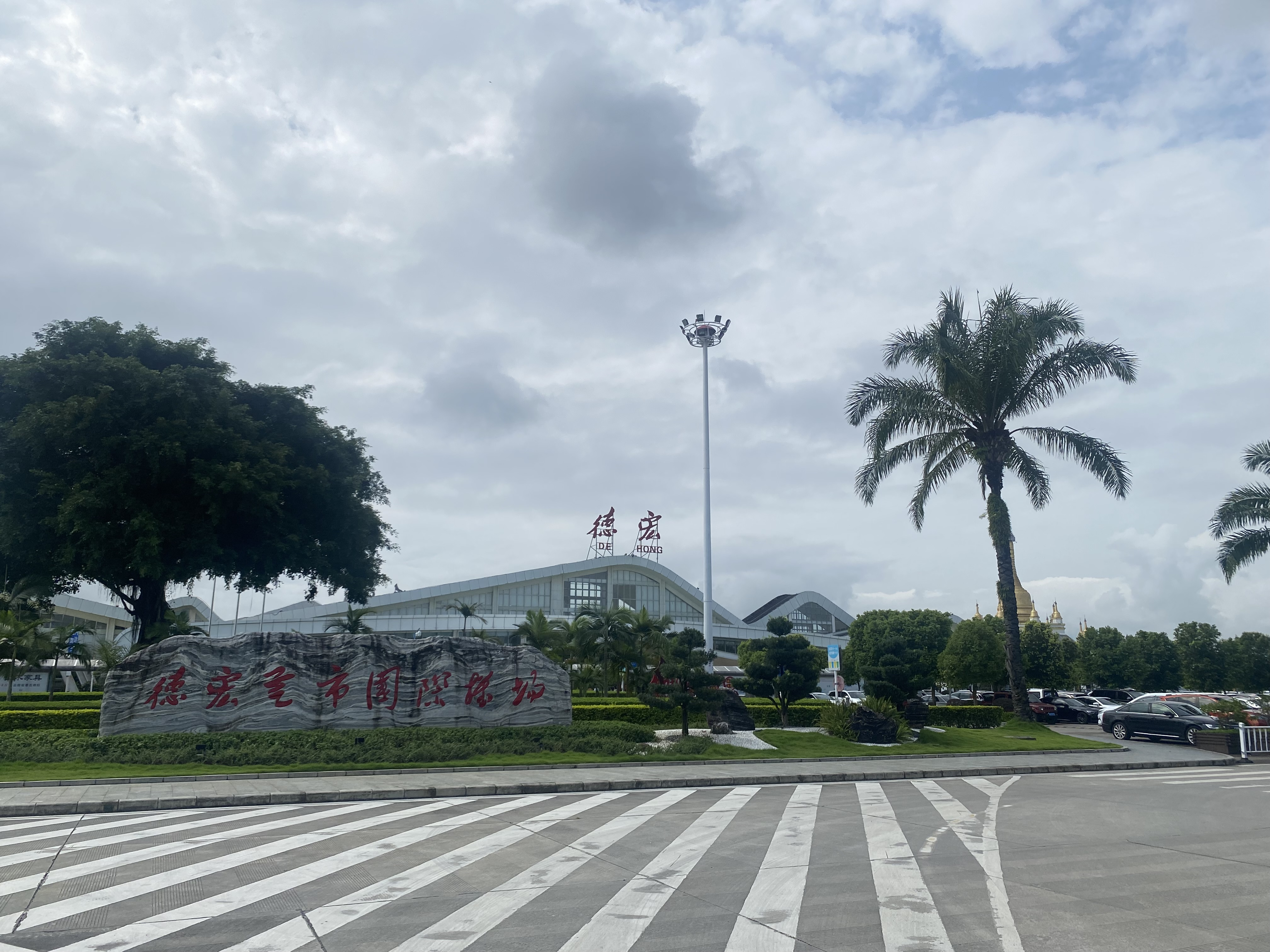
- IATA: LUM; ICAO: ZPMS

Summary
- Airport type: Public
- Location: Mangshi, Dehong, Yunnan, China
- Elevation AMSL: 877 m (2,877 ft)
- Coordinates: 24°24′00″N 98°32′00″E
- Website: dh.ynairport.com

Map
- Location in Yunnan LUM/ZPMS (China)

Runways
Direction	Length		Surface
Direction	m	ft	Surface
05/23	2,200	7,218	Concrete

Statistics (2025)
- Passengers: 3,075,024
- Aircraft movements: 24,432
- Cargo (metric tons): 16,281.4
- Source: CAAC

Dehong Mangshi International Airport
- Simplified Chinese: 德宏芒市国际机场
- Traditional Chinese: 德宏芒市國際機場
Transcriptions
Standard Mandarin
- Hanyu Pinyin: Déhóng Mángshì Guójì Jīchǎng

Dehong Mangshi International Airport (IATA: LUM, ICAO: ZPMS) is an airport serving Mangshi in Dehong, Yunnan, China.

== History ==
Mangshi Airport first opened in 1940 during Second Sino-Japanese War with a 1,900 meters runway. Some of P-40, C-46 and C-47 had landed here for military purpose. After 1945, the airport was deserted.

The Dehong Dai and Jingpo Autonomous Prefecture People's Government proposed plans to repair Mangshi Airport three times, in 1954, 1959, and 1966, but these plans failed due to various reasons. Later, with the assistance of the Kunming Air Force Command, preliminary repairs were carried out on the old runway. However, due to the onset of the Cultural Revolution, airport construction was once again suspended. In August 1976, the Fifth Army of the Chinese People's Liberation Army Air Force, stationed in Kunming, successfully conducted a test flight of Mangshi Airport using an An-24 aircraft, taking off from Baoshan Airport. In March 1984, Dehong Prefecture People's Congress representatives Dao Anju (then Governor) and Jin Degui (then Secretary of the Prefecture Party Committee) proposed a motion to rebuild Mangshi Airport at the Fourth Session of the Sixth National People's Congress.

On April 20, 1985, Dehong Prefecture submitted a report to the "Yunnan Provincial People's Government requesting the expansion of Mangshi Airport" (德政请[1985]4号) , requesting that Mangshi Airport be designed and constructed according to the national third-class airport standards; and that a preliminary design be made according to the national second-class airport standards in the long term, which could meet the requirements for take-off and landing of Boeing 737-300 aircraft. Later, the province government submitted documents such as the "Mangshi Airport Expansion Plan Task Book" (芒市飞机场扩建计划任务书) and the "Report on the Demonstration Opinions on the Construction of Mangshi Airport" (关于修建芒市机场论证意见的报告), and the construction of the airport received attention from the central and provincial leaders.

On March 8 and May 16, 1986, He Zhiqiang, then Governor of Yunnan Province, and Wang Zhaoguo, (alternate) Secretary of the Secretariat of the CPC Central Committee, inspected Mangshi Airport one after another. On June 30, 1986, the Yunnan Provincial People's Government submitted a report to the State Council requesting the restoration of Mangshi Airport to a civil airport (关于请求将芒市机场修复为民用机场的报告). On September 15, the Civil Aviation Administration of Yunnan Province arranged for an An-24 aircraft to conduct a test flight in Mangshi. After demonstration, it was determined that it was entirely feasible for Boeing 737-300 aircraft to take off and land at Mangshi Airport, and it was designed as a Class III airport. Since the old airport had been out of use for more than 40 years and had been poorly managed, farmers around the airport had freely cultivated and occupied more than 1,700 mu of airport land. Dehong Prefecture began to arrange the land acquisition and adjustment work for the construction of the airport on November 2, which took one year and three months to complete.

On May 11, 1987, the Central Government approved the construction of Mangshi Civil Airport, which was designed and constructed according to the technical requirements of An-24 and Y-7 type aircraft, with a total investment of RMB33 million, of which Dehong Prefecture contributed RMB22 million. On October 1, 1988, the reconstruction project officially started with a ceremony. In January 1989, because the An-24 passenger aircraft was a model that was about to be phased out, the Civil Aviation Administration agreed to extend the length of the Mangshi Airport runway by 400 meters on the basis of the original approved 1,800 meters, and build it in one go, so as to accommodate Boeing 737 aircraft. On March 17, 1990, the test flight was completed, and on March 25, the reconstruction project was officially completed and accepted, and the flight area level was 3C. Mangshi Airport covers a total area of 2,639.9 mu (亩). The runway is 2,200 meters long, 45 meters wide, and 0.26 meters thick, with a cement concrete pavement. The apron is 100×60 meters in size and has 6 oil storage tanks with a total capacity of 180 cubic meters. The total area of the newly built terminal buildings is 11,911.56 square meters, including the air traffic control building of 1,430.78 square meters, the waiting hall of 1,851.5 square meters, the ticket hall of 1,952.63 square meters, and the cargo hall of 607.85 square meters.

On April 6, 1990, the Mangshi Civil Aviation Station opened for ticket sales; on April 10, the round-trip route between Mangshi and Kunming Wujiaba International Airport officially commenced, operated by Boeing 737-300 aircraft, with two flights per week. The first aircraft to arrive at Mangshi Airport was a Boeing 737-300 aircraft with registration number B-2517, operated by China Southwest Airlines from Kunming, with 50,000 people participating in the inaugural flight celebration. In 1991, the number of weekly flights on the Mangshi-Kunming route increased to 6, and in July 1992, it increased to 10 flights per week. On March 3, 1993, Chengdu Golden Dragon Charter Company launched a direct flight between Chengdu and Mangshi, with two flights per week. This was the second route and the first inter-provincial flight opened by Mangshi Airport.

In 1994, an omnidirectional beacon tower was built and the airport perimeter was renovated. In 1996, the airfield patrol pavement was renovated, and a Category I instrument landing system and a Category I approach lighting system were installed on runway 23. In 1997, the DVOR/DME (omnidirectional beacon/distance measuring instrument) system was put into use. In 1998, the navigation lighting system was renovated, and in October of the same year, the apron was expanded, adding 10,385 square meters of area, bringing the total apron area to 16,385 square meters. On July 1, 2000, the ILS instrument landing system installed at Mangshi Airport was put into use, and night flights were officially opened on December 10.

In 2003, the CAAC renamed it to Dehong Mangshi Airport. The first round expend construction started in 2006 and finished in 2009. The terminal was renovated as a peacock shape, and two airbridges was built. Mangshi airport upgraded to an international airport in 2016, and the second round expend construction started. In 2018, the expend construction finished and the runway expanded to 2,600 meters. On 31 January 2019, Ruili Airlines opened the first international flight to Mandalay, Myanmar.

On May 30, 2023, the Civil Aviation Administration of China officially approved the renaming of Dehong Mangshi Airport to "Dehong Mangshi International Airport."

== Facilities ==
The airport runway is 2,600 meters long and 45 meters wide, with a direction of 05/23 and a Pavement Classification Number (PCN) value of 61/F/B/W/T. It can accommodate Boeing 737-800, Airbus A320 and smaller aircraft. Since the area within 5 kilometers of the airport is mountainous, the southwest airspace is relatively clear, so 23 is the main departure mode. The airport has 3 vertical taxiways, 1 fast exit taxiway and 25 aircraft stands. It is equipped with an instrument landing system, VHF omnidirectional beacon, rangefinder, approach lighting system and other communication, navigation, meteorology, maintenance, security and transportation equipment, and is capable of night flight.

The new terminal was put into use on May 6, 2009. The design style is a garden layout with ethnic style. The total building area is 13,000 square meters, including 10,500 square meters for domestic waiting hall and 2,500 square meters reserved for international waiting hall. There are three boarding bridges and a total parking area of 12,000 square meters. In the future, Mangshi Airport will carry out capacity expansion and renovation of the old terminal and construction of a new terminal and cargo warehouse of 40,000 square meters.

== Airlines and destinations ==
Airlines	Destinations
Air China	Chengdu–Tianfu
Air Travel	Changsha, Nanchang
China Eastern Airlines	Beijing–Daxing, Chengdu–Tianfu, Guangzhou, Kunming, Nanjing, Shanghai–Pudong
China Express Airlines	Chongqing, Lancang
China Southern Airlines	Guangzhou
Chongqing Airlines	Guangzhou
Colorful Guizhou Airlines	Chengdu–Tianfu, Guiyang
Kunming Airlines	Hangzhou, Kunming
Loong Air	Ningbo
Lucky Air	Kunming
Myanmar National Airlines	Mandalay, Yangon
Ruili Airlines	Changsha, Changzhou, Chongqing, Fuzhou, Guiyang, Hefei, Jieyang, Kunming, Lijiang, Mandalay, Quanzhou, Taiyuan, Wuhan, Wuxi, Xishuangbanna
Sichuan Airlines	Chengdu–Tianfu
Spring Airlines	Kunming, Shijiazhuang
Xizang Airlines	Kunming

== See also ==
- List of airports in the People's Republic of China
- List of the busiest airports in the People's Republic of China
