= Linyi Qiyang International Airport =

Airport serving Linyi, Shandong, China

Linyi Qiyang International Airport 临沂启阳国际机场
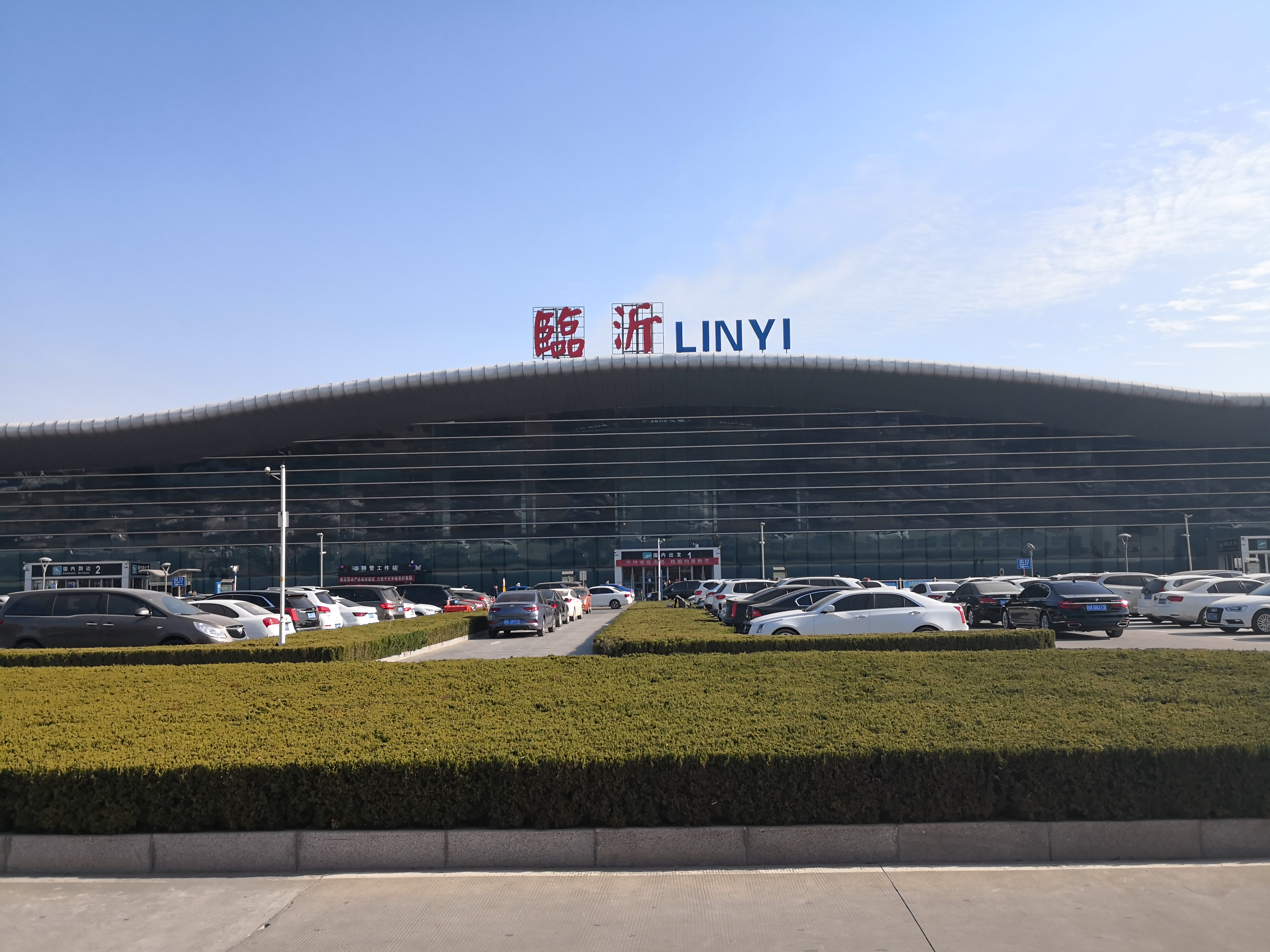
- IATA: LYI; ICAO: ZSLY

Summary
- Airport type: Public
- Serves: Linyi
- Location: Hedong, Linyi, Shandong, China
- Elevation AMSL: 62 m (203 ft)
- Coordinates: 35°02′46″N 118°24′42″E
- Website: www.lyairport.net

Map
- Location in Shandong LYI/ZSLY (China)

Runways
Direction	Length		Surface
Direction	m	ft	Surface
01/19	3,200	10,499	Concrete

Statistics (2025)
- Passengers: 2,467,279
- Aircraft movements: 27,178
- Cargo (metric tons): 8,144.7
- Source: CAAC

Linyi Qiyang International Airport
- Simplified Chinese: 临沂启阳国际机场
- Traditional Chinese: 臨沂啟陽國際機場
Transcriptions
Standard Mandarin
- Hanyu Pinyin: Línyí Qǐyáng Guójì Jīchǎng

Linyi Qiyang International Airport (IATA: LYI, ICAO: ZSLY) is an airport serving the city of Linyi in Shandong province, China. The airport was built in 1934 and was initially named Linyi Shubuling Airport (Chinese: 临沂沭埠岭机场) because it was located in Shubuling Village. After a long period of construction and maintenance, the airport officially passed inspection and resumed operation on December 26, 1998. The airport is the earliest civilian airport in Shandong Province. After resuming operation in 1998 and undergoing several renovations and expansions, the airport was renamed "Linyi Qiyang Airport" at the end of 2019, and was officially renamed to an international airport in April 2024, becoming an important international aviation hub in southern Shandong.

== Airlines and destinations ==
Linyi Airport is served by the following airlines:

Airlines	Destinations
9 Air	Guangzhou
Air China	Chengdu–Tianfu
Air Guilin	Haikou, Zhangjiajie
Beijing Capital Airlines	Guilin, Haikou, Sanya
China Eastern Airlines	Changchun, Hangzhou, Shanghai–Hongqiao
China Express Airlines	Chengdu–Tianfu, Fuzhou, Zhoushan
China Southern Airlines	Guangzhou, Guiyang, Jieyang, Wuhan
Chongqing Airlines	Chongqing, Dalian
Kunming Airlines	Changsha, Kunming
Loong Air	Changchun, Harbin, Hangzhou, Hong Kong, Kunming, Xining, Yinchuan
Shandong Airlines	Taiyuan, Xiamen
Shanghai Airlines	Shanghai–Pudong
Shenzhen Airlines	Guangzhou, Harbin, Nanchang, Nanning, Ningbo, Shenyang, Shenzhen, Wenzhou, Xi'an
Tianjin Airlines	Ürümqi
Xizang Airlines	Chengdu–Shuangliu, Lhasa

== See also ==
- List of airports in China
- List of the busiest airports in China
