= Tengchong Tuofeng Airport =

Tengchong Tuofeng Airport 腾冲驼峰机场
- IATA: TCZ; ICAO: ZPTC

Summary
- Airport type: Public
- Serves: Tengchong, Yunnan
- Elevation AMSL: 1,888 m (6,194 ft)
- Coordinates: 24°56′18″N 98°29′09″E
- Website: tc.ynairport.com

Map
- Location of airport in Yunnan

Runways
Direction	Length		Surface
Direction	m	ft	Surface
18/36	2,350	7,710

Statistics (2025)
- Passengers: 842,326
- Aircraft movements: 7,890
- Cargo (metric tons): 2,407.6

Tengchong Tuofeng Airport
- Simplified Chinese: 腾冲驼峰机场
- Traditional Chinese: 騰衝駝峰機場
Transcriptions
Standard Mandarin
- Hanyu Pinyin: Téngchōng Tuófēng Jīchǎng

Tengchong Tuofeng Airport (IATA: TCZ, ICAO: ZPTC) is an airport serving Tengchong in the west of Yunnan Province. It is located near the village of Tuofeng (驼峰村), Qingshui Township, 12 kilometers south of the city seat. It takes about 15 minutes by car to arrive in central Tengchong City. The airport was opened on 16 February 2009. Due to increasing demand, especially from domestic tourism, a new and much larger terminal (Terminal 2) opened on 9 September 2018.

== History ==
In 1939, the Japanese army cut off all transportation routes along the Chinese coast, and the Sino-Japanese War reached its most difficult moment. The Burma Road quickly became the only channel for international aid supplies to enter China. The American Volunteer Group (also known as the "Flying Tigers") of the Chinese Air Force, stationed in Kunming, Yunnan, frequently flew over western Yunnan to fight Japanese aircraft in order to ensure the smooth flow of supplies and support the Chinese Expeditionary Force in its operations in Burma. That year, due to the needs of the war, Tengchong County was ordered to select a site to build an airport. The final location was determined to be Maojia Village in the former Qiluo Township and Dadong Township. Construction began in early 1940, and it was largely completed and test-flown three months later. The airport was officially completed in early 1941, with a runway 1200 meters long.

In May 1942, the Burma Road, China's last vital transportation link to the outside world, was cut off by the Japanese army. To supply China, the United States and China opened a new air route from Assam, India, to Kunming, China. This route traversed several mountain ranges in the southern Himalayas, and the continuous snow-capped peaks and undulating flight path resembled a camel's hump, hence the name "Hump Route." From 1942 to 1945, the U.S. Air Transport Corps deployed more than 2,000 transport planes to transport strategic materials and troops, making more than 1.8 million flights. During this period, 563 aircraft and more than 1,500 pilots were laid to rest in the deep valleys and mountains along the flight paths.

The original airport closed in 1949. The new airport project was restarted in 2000, and the new airport was named Tengchong Tuofeng Airport. Construction was expected to start in 2005 with a total investment of 544 million yuan and a construction period of 27 months. It opened to traffic in 2008. Designed to domestic regional airport standards, the airport features a 2,350-meter runway and a designed annual passenger capacity of 480,000, capable of handling aircraft such as the Boeing 737 and Airbus A320. The airport construction project was completed in December 2008, and the airport officially opened to traffic on January 23, 2009.

The second phase of the expansion and renovation project of Tengchong Airport officially commenced on October 15, 2015. On September 9, 2018, Terminal 2 of Tengchong Tuofeng Airport was put into operation. The expansion of the flight area was also completed, with the addition of one parallel taxiway, one exit taxiway, and one perpendicular taxiway, increasing the total number of aircraft stands to 12 and adding 5 boarding bridges, bringing the airport's hardware facilities up to the requirements of a medium-sized airport.

The runway extension project at Tengchong Tuofeng Airport was launched in 2025. The project will extend the runway northward by 650 meters to 3,000 meters, enabling the airport to accommodate Category E aircraft such as the Boeing 747.

== Airlines and destinations ==
Airlines	Destinations
China Eastern Airlines	Chengdu–Tianfu, Kunming
Kunming Airlines	Changsha, Chongqing, Kunming, Taiyuan, Xi'an
Lucky Air	Kunming, Wuhan
Ruili Airlines	Kunming

== See also ==
- List of airports in China
- List of the busiest airports in the People's Republic of China
