= Xiangyang Liuji Airport =

Xiangyang Liuji Airport 襄阳刘集机场
- Terminal 2
- IATA: XFN; ICAO: ZHXF

Summary
- Airport type: Public
- Serves: Xiangyang, Hubei, China
- Coordinates: 32°09′00″N 112°17′26″E

Map
- Location of airport in Hubei

Runways
Direction	Length		Surface
Direction	m	ft	Surface
01/19	2,400	7,874

Statistics (2025)
- Passengers: 1,899,754
- Aircraft movements: 67,795
- Cargo (metric tons): 3,405.0
- Source: CAAC

Xiangyang Liuji Airport
- Simplified Chinese: 襄阳刘集机场
- Traditional Chinese: 襄陽劉集機場
Transcriptions
Standard Mandarin
- Hanyu Pinyin: Xiāngyáng Liújí Jīchǎng

Xiangyang Liuji Airport (IATA: XFN, ICAO: ZHXF) is located in the northeast corner of Xiangyang City, Hubei Province, about 18 kilometers from the city center. It covers an area of 1876 mu (125.07 hectares) at an altitude of 72 meters. The airport officially opened on December 14, 1989. It was built by the local government with an investment of more than 30 million yuan over three years, becoming the first civilian airport in China to be newly built with local funding. The airport has a 2,400-meter-long runway. It operates routes to Beijing, Shanghai Hongqiao, Guangzhou, Shenzhen, Wuhan, Haikou, Chongqing, Xi'an, and Hangzhou. There are two daily flights to Beijing, three to Wuhan, and one daily to the other destinations.

== History ==
Xiangyang Liuji Airport was known as Xiangfan Liuji Airport before Xiangfan City changed its name to Xiangyang City. Xiangfan Liuji Airport was approved by the State Council and the Central Military Commission on January 30, 1986, and was constructed with self-raised funds by the Xiangfan Municipal Government. The airport was officially opened to traffic on December 14, 1989, becoming my country's first newly built civil airport with local funds. The first phase of the runway construction is 1,800m long and 45m wide. It can take off and land medium-sized passenger aircraft such as Boeing 737, and the flight technology level is 3c.

In 2001, Xiangfan Liuji Airport carried out a flight area expansion project, including extending the runway 600 meters to the north, with a total length of 2,400 meters, increasing the civil aviation terminal area to 20,000 square meters, increasing the apron area to 81,000 square meters, and upgrading the flight area grade from 3C to 4C; in September, the Xiangfan Civil Aviation Station of Xiangfan Liuji Airport was acquired by Beijing Taiyue Group.

In 2012, Xiangyang Airport underwent another expansion project with an investment of nearly 1 billion yuan. After the project is completed, it can meet the annual passenger throughput demand of 1 million. The expansion project included an increase of 1,112 acres in the airport's area from 1,920 acres at the time to 3,032 acres; a new 1,200 meters of taxiing runway, bringing the total length of the airport runway to 3,600 meters; the airport terminal will be expanded from the current 3,000 square meters to 16,000 square meters; a new double-layer corridor bridge will be built between the terminal building and the apron, so that passengers arriving and departing can go up and down without interfering with each other; and the number of apron will be increased from the existing 4 to 9. The runway extension and supporting projects were completed in 2013. In 2014, the flight area of the airport was upgraded from 4C to 4D, and the fire rescue level was upgraded accordingly. The terminal 2 expansion project also started at the same year. The terminal 2 expansion project was completed and put into use on October 29, 2017.

On June 25, 2019, the National Port Management Office officially approved the temporary opening of Xiangyang Liuji Airport to international flight for one month, from August 1 to August 31. At 3:15 a.m. on August 17, 2019, a cargo charter flight from Billund Airport in Denmark successfully landed at Xiangyang Liuji Airport.

On June 16, 2025, the airport held a groundbreaking ceremony for the apron renovation project to upgrade airport infrastructure and enhance aviation capabilities. The main construction content of the project is to add 3 new Class C aircraft positions on the north side of the T2 apron, and provide supporting facilities such as service lanes, high pole lights, and aircraft position signs. At the same time, a special vehicle parking area will be constructed at the north end of the station apron, and a Class D isolated aircraft position will be set up on the north vertical slide. This will effectively increase the number and rational layout of parking spaces at the airport, optimize the airport's operation process, and improve the support level of the airport.

== Airlines and destinations ==
Airlines	Destinations
Air Guilin	Dalian
China Express Airlines	Xiamen, Xi'an
China Southern Airlines	Guangzhou
GX Airlines	Hohhot, Nanning, Qingdao
Juneyao Air	Shanghai–Hongqiao
Kunming Airlines	Kunming, Nanjing
Loong Air	Changchun, Chengdu–Tianfu, Chongqing, Guangzhou, Haikou, Hangzhou, Harbin, Lanzhou, Lijiang, Ningbo, Wenzhou, Wuxi, Yinchuan
Shenzhen Airlines	Beijing–Capital, Shenyang, Shenzhen, Zhuhai
Tianjin Airlines	Sanya, Urumqi
XiamenAir	Wuhan

== See also ==
- List of airports in China
