= Yuncheng Yanhu International Airport =

Airport serving Yuncheng, Shanxi, China

Yuncheng Yanhu International Airport 运城盐湖国际机场
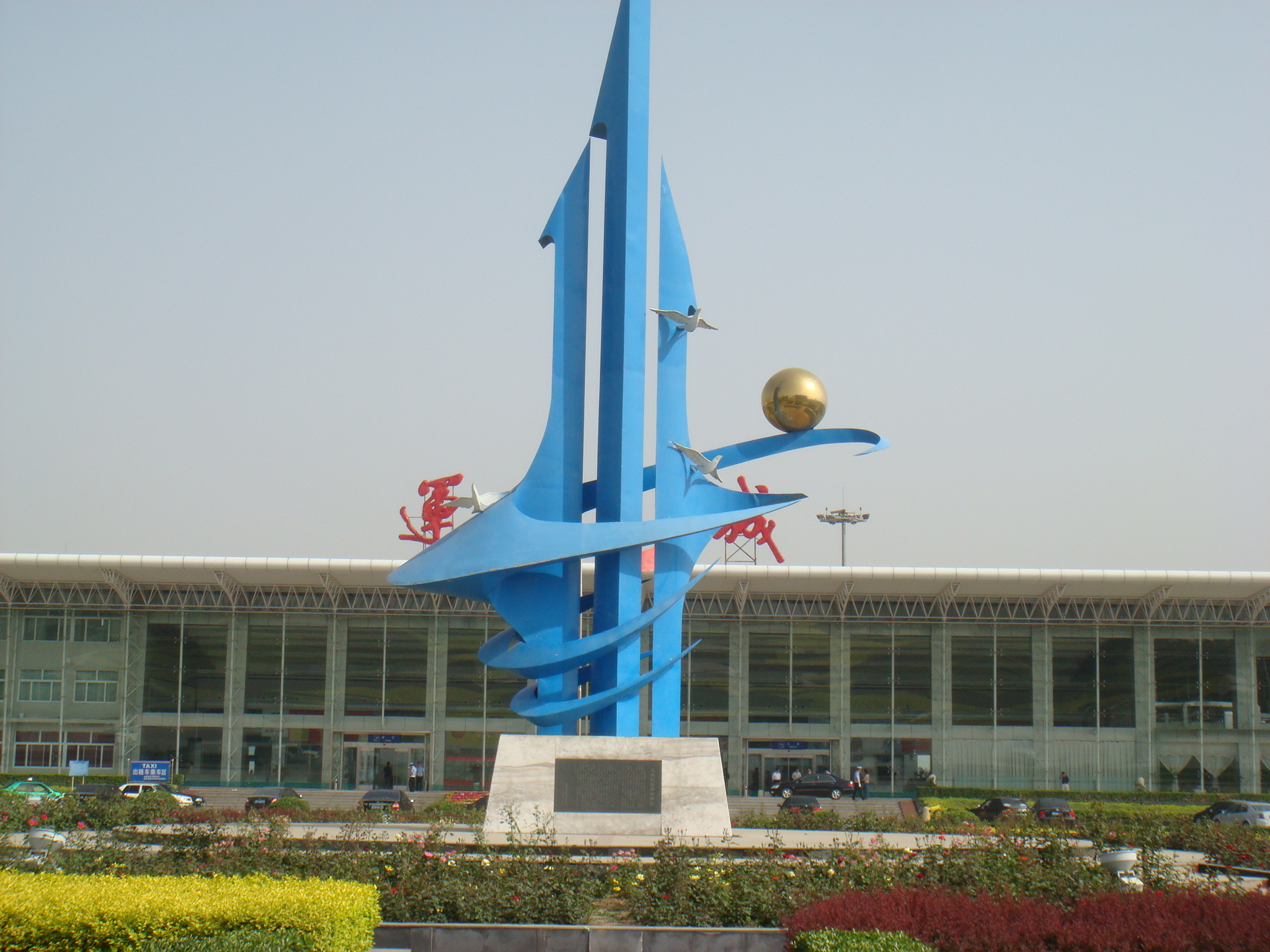
- IATA: YCU; ICAO: ZBYC

Summary
- Airport type: Public
- Serves: Yuncheng
- Location: Zhangxiao Village, Taocun Town, Yuncheng, Shanxi, China
- Opened: February 2005; 21 years ago
- Coordinates: 35°07′00″N 111°02′23″E
- Website: www.ycport.com

Map
- Location in Shanxi YCU/ZBYC (China)

Runways
Direction	Length		Surface
Direction	m	ft	Surface
08/26	3,000	9,843	Concrete

Statistics (2025)
- Passengers: 2,873,454
- Aircraft movements: 25,867
- Cargo (metric tons): 8,558.9
- Source: List of the busiest airports in the People's Republic of China

Yuncheng Yanhu International Airport
- Simplified Chinese: 运城盐湖国际机场
- Traditional Chinese: 運城鹽湖國際機場
Transcriptions
Standard Mandarin
- Hanyu Pinyin: Yùnchéng Yánhú Guójì Jīchǎng

Yuncheng Yanhu International Airport (IATA: YCU, ICAO: ZBYC) is an airport serving the city of Yuncheng in North China's Shanxi province. It is located in Zhangxiao Village, Taocun Town, 11 km (6.8 mi) northeast of the city center, and was formerly known as Yuncheng Zhangxiao Airport. In 2010 Yuncheng Airport served more than 600,000 passengers, ranking 62nd among all airports in China.

== History ==
Yuncheng Zhangxiao Airport, formerly the Yuncheng Air Force Airport, is currently the third international airport and the second largest airport in Shanxi Province. It was initially opened for joint military and civilian use on February 7, 2002. In October 2004, the airport was completed and inspected; on December 6, the school flight was successful. With a total investment of 350 million yuan. It was later converted into a civilian transport airport, commencing operations on February 7, 2005, with the first route being Beijing Capital International Airport operated by China International Airlines.

In May 2007, approximately two years after the airport was put into operation, the airport underwent an expansion of its flight area. The runway was extended 600 meters westward from 2,400 meters to 3,000 meters, and its width increased from 45 meters to 60 meters. The apron area was expanded from over 20,000 square meters to over 40,000 square meters. The expansion also included the relocation of the west approach navigator, glide slope, and west approach platform, as well as the installation of a new Category I precision approach lighting system. Upon completion, Yuncheng Guan Gong Airport's flight area classification was upgraded from 3C to 4D, enabling it to handle aircraft up to the Boeing 767-300 and Airbus A330.

The expansion project was completed in 2008. Following the expansion, test flights were conducted. From July 19 to 22, a King Air 200 calibration aircraft dispatched by the Civil Aviation Administration of China conducted calibration flights, and all test items met design standards. The airport passed industrial acceptance on July 23, 2008.

From March 2009 to March 2012, Yuncheng Airport underwent an expansion of its terminal area. This project was designated a key project of Shanxi Province, with a total investment of 441 million yuan. The new terminal building has a total construction area of 27,000 square meters, six boarding bridges, an expanded apron of 19,300 square meters, increasing the number of aircraft stands to ten, an expanded parking lot of 15,300 square meters, and supporting facilities such as fire protection, water supply and drainage, HVAC, roads, and landscaping. It can meet the needs of 1.5 million passengers annually, 875 passengers per peak hour, and 8,000 tons of cargo and mail. The construction of the new terminal building has brought Yuncheng Airport's hardware facilities to the scale of an advanced domestic regional airport. On 9 May 2012, a new 25,000-square-meter terminal building was opened, ten times the size of the original building.

In April 2017, Yuncheng Airport opened a temporary air port, subsequently launching routes from Yuncheng to international and regional destinations such as Hong Kong, Bangkok, and Pattaya. Since its opening, it has safely handled over 130,000 flights, transporting over 10 million passengers. As of November this year, passenger throughput has exceeded 2 million, reaching the originally approved design capacity 12 years ahead of schedule.

On October 26, 2018, another expansion project, with a total investment of 2.19 billion yuan, commenced construction. The expansion project was divided into two parts: terminal area expansion and flight area expansion. The terminal area expansion project, with an estimated investment of 680 million yuan, will construct a new 27,000-square-meter international terminal building; build a 700-square-meter connecting corridor between Terminals 1 and 2; expand the elevated bridge area by 11,000 square meters; construct a new air traffic control tower and control tower of 1,750 square meters, and other ancillary facilities. The flight area expansion project, with an estimated investment of 1.51 billion yuan, includes upgrading the airport to 4E-level, the construction of a new 3,200-meter runway; resurfacing the existing runway and apron, converting the existing runway into a parallel taxiway; constructing a new 70,000-square-meter apron; building a new in-flight catering production area on 40 mu (approximately 6.6 hectares) south of the existing runway; and constructing a new aviation fuel station and fuel depot on 87 mu (approximately 5.8 hectares) northeast of the new runway.

On October 20, 2023, the new runway at Yuncheng Airport in Shanxi Province successfully completed its test flight with an A330 aircraft. This signifies that Yuncheng Airport has the capability to handle large passenger aircraft.

== Facilities ==
Yuncheng Airport has a runway that is 3000 meters long and 60 meters wide (class 4D), and seven aircraft parking aprons. It has a 25,000-square-meter terminal building that was opened in May 2012. It is designed to serve 1.2 million passengers and 8000 tons of cargo per year, with a peak capacity of 875 passengers per hour.

== Airlines and destinations ==
Yuncheng Yanhu Airport is served by the following airlines:

Airlines	Destinations
Air China	Beijing–Capital, Beijing–Daxing, Chengdu–Tianfu, Chongqing, Guangzhou, Guiyang, Hangzhou, Shenyang, Ürümqi
China Eastern Airlines	Hefei, Shanghai–Pudong, Wuhan
China Southern Airlines	Guangzhou
Kunming Airlines	Changsha
Shandong Airlines	Jinan, Kunming
Shanghai Airlines	Changchun, Kuala Lumpur–International
Shenzhen Airlines	Bangkok–Suvarnabhumi, Haikou, Hangzhou, Harbin, Nagoya–Centrair, Nanchang, Nanjing, Nanning, Ningbo, Quanzhou, Sanya, Shenzhen, Wenzhou, Wuhan, Wuxi
XiamenAir	Changchun, Changsha, Chongqing, Dalian, Fuzhou, Hefei, Hohhot, Nanjing, Quanzhou, Tianjin, Xiamen
Xizang Airlines	Chengdu–Shuangliu, Hong Kong, Kunming, Lijiang, Xining

== See also ==
- List of airports in China
- List of the busiest airports in China
