= JMJ =

JMJ may refer to:

- An abbreviation for the Holy Family (consisting of Jesus, Mary, and Joseph), printed by Christians on the top of letters and other places
- IATA code for Lancang Jingmai Airport
- Jam Master Jay (1965–2002), American musician and rapper
- Jam Master Jay Records, an American record label
- Jean-Michel Jarre (born 1948), French composer and producer
- Justin Meldal-Johnsen (born 1970), American musician
- World Youth Day (French: Journées Mondiales de la Jeunesse, Spanish Jornada Mundial de la Juventud, Portuguese: Jornada Mundial da Juventude)
