= Quanzhou Jinjiang International Airport =

Airport serving Quanzhou, Fujian, China

Quanzhou Jinjiang International Airport 泉州晋江国际机场
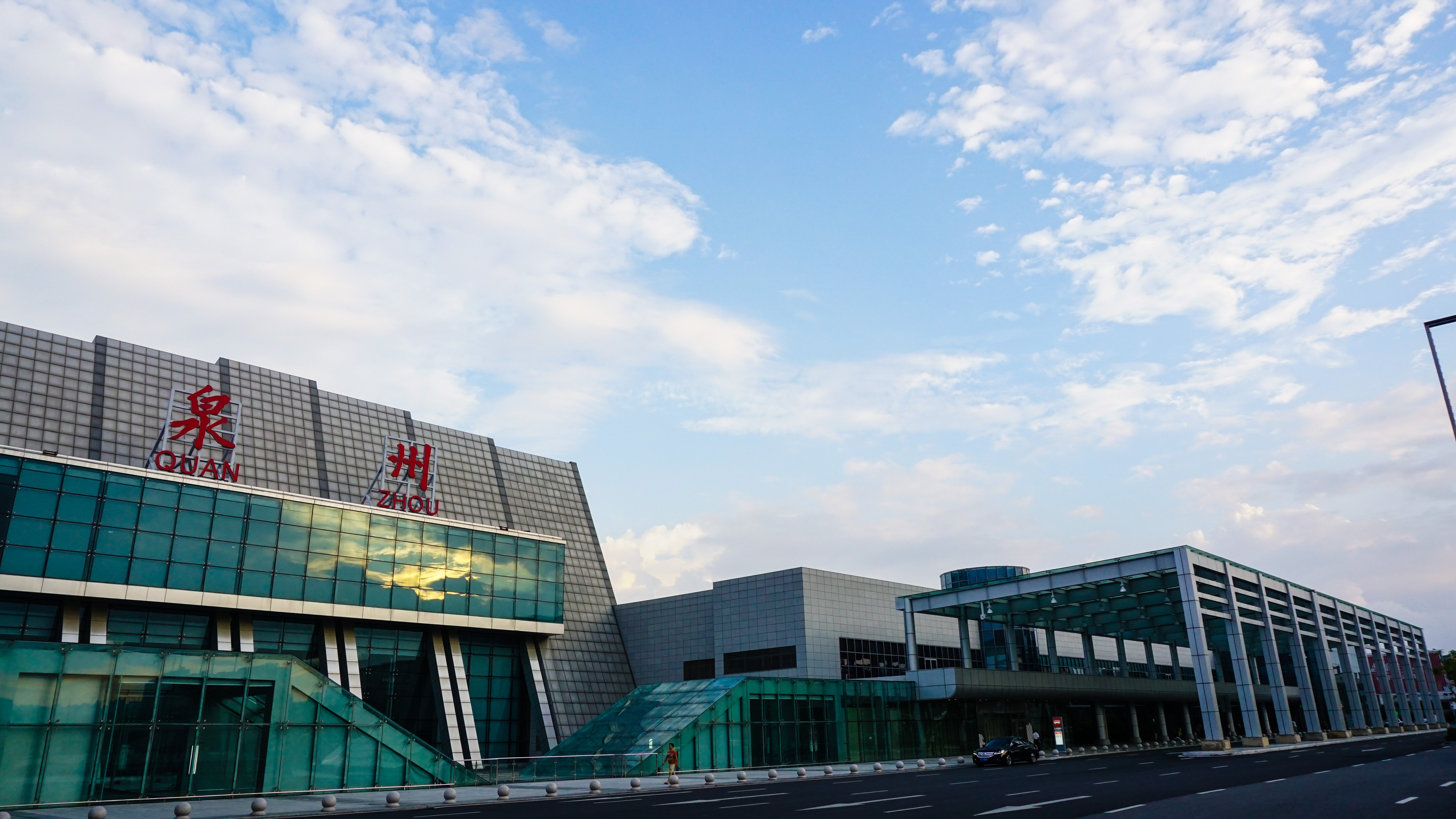
- IATA: JJN; ICAO: ZSQZ

Summary
- Airport type: Public / military
- Serves: Quanzhou
- Location: Jinjiang, Quanzhou, Fujian, China
- Opened: August 1955; 71 years ago
- Focus city for: XiamenAir
- Coordinates: 24°47′56″N 118°35′22″E
- Website: www.qzair.com

Map
- Location in Fujian JJN/ZSQZ (China)

Runways
Direction	Length		Surface
Direction	m	ft	Surface
03/21	2,600	8,530	Asphalt

Statistics (2025)
- Passengers: 8,852,384
- Aircraft movements: 62,771
- Freight (in tonnes): 74,115.7

Quanzhou Jinjiang International Airport
- Simplified Chinese: 泉州晋江国际机场
- Traditional Chinese: 泉州晉江國際機場
Transcriptions
Standard Mandarin
- Hanyu Pinyin: Quánzhōu Jìnjiāng Guójì Jīchǎng
Southern Min
- Hokkien POJ: Choâⁿ-chiu Chìn-kang Kok-chè Ki-tiû

Quanzhou Jinjiang International Airport (IATA: JJN, ICAO: ZSQZ) is a dual-use military and commercial airport serving the city of Quanzhou in East China's Fujian province. It is located 12 km (7.5 mi) south of the city center (aka Licheng and Fengze Districts), in the county-level city of Jinjiang, which is under the administration of the prefecture-level city of Quanzhou.

In 2025, the number of passenger movements of Quanzhou Jinjiang International Airport was 8,852,384, representing a year-on-year increase of 0.1%.

== History ==
Quanzhou Airport started operations on 12 December 1996, being upgraded to an international airport in November 2012.

== Airlines and destinations ==
Quanzhou Airport is served by the following airlines:

Airlines	Destinations
Air Chang'an	Guiyang
Air China	Chengdu–Tianfu
Air Travel	Changsha
Beijing Capital Airlines	Yancheng
Chengdu Airlines	Chengdu–Shuangliu
China Eastern Airlines	Chengdu–Tianfu, Hefei, Shanghai–Pudong, Wuhan, Xi'an, Yichang
China Express Airlines	Chizhou, Chongqing, Xuzhou
China Southern Airlines	Beijing–Daxing, Guangzhou
China United Airlines	Beijing–Daxing, Yueyang
Colorful Guizhou Airlines	Guiyang
Donghai Airlines	Chongqing, Nantong, Shiyan, Zhuhai
Hainan Airlines	Haikou, Wuhu
Jiangxi Air	Huai'an
Loong Air	Dalian, Hangzhou, Xuzhou
Lucky Air	Kunming
Philippine Airlines	Manila
Qingdao Airlines	Qingdao, Zhoushan
Ruili Airlines	Kunming, Mangshi
Shandong Airlines	Jinan, Zhoushan
Shanghai Airlines	Shanghai–Hongqiao
Shenzhen Airlines	Beijing–Capital, Changchun, Changzhou, Chengdu–Tianfu, Hefei, Lianyungang, Nanjing, Nanning, Nantong, Shenyang, Taiyuan, Tianjin, Wuhan, Wuxi, Xi'an, Yangzhou, Yibin, Yichang, Yuncheng, Zhanjiang, Zhengzhou, Zhoushan
Sichuan Airlines	Chengdu–Tianfu, Dazhou
Spring Airlines	Shanghai–Hongqiao, Shijiazhuang
Tianjin Airlines	Guiyang, Xi'an, Xiangxi
Urumqi Air	Zhengzhou
West Air	Chongqing, Nanjing,
XiamenAir	Beijing–Daxing, Cebu, Changchun, Changsha, Chengdu–Tianfu, Chongqing, Dalian, Guangzhou, Guiyang, Haikou, Hangzhou, Harbin, Hefei, Hohhot, Jinan, Kuala Lumpur–International, Kunming, Luzhou, Macau, Manila, Mianyang, Nanjing, Nanning, Qingdao, Shanghai–Hongqiao, Shenyang, Tianjin, Urumqi, Wuhan, Xi'an, Xining, Yinchuan, Yuncheng, Zhengzhou, Zhoushan, Zhuhai, Zunyi–Maotai

=== Cargo ===
Airlines	Destinations
Central Airlines	Manila

== See also ==
- List of airports in China
- List of the busiest airports in China
- List of People's Liberation Army Air Force airbases
