= Kunming Changshui International Airport =

Airport in Yunnan, China

Kunming Changshui International Airport 昆明长水国际机场
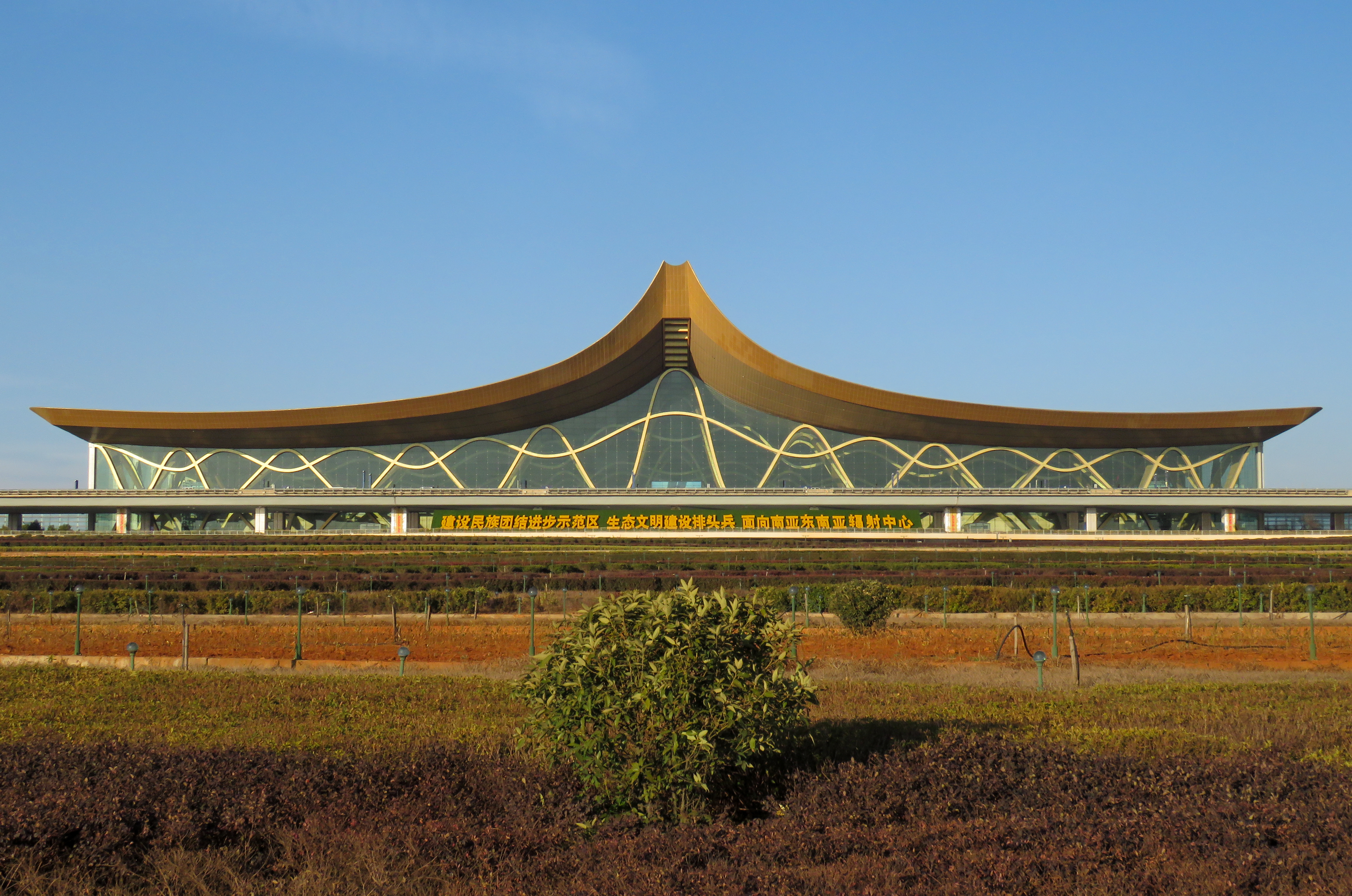
- Airport terminal
- IATA: KMG; ICAO: ZPPP

Summary
- Airport type: Public
- Owner/Operator: Yunnan Airport Group
- Serves: Kunming
- Location: Changshui, Guandu, Kunming, Yunnan, China
- Opened: 28 June 2012; 14 years ago
- Hub for: China Eastern Airlines; Hongtu Airlines; Kunming Airlines; Lucky Air; Ruili Airlines; Sichuan Airlines
- Focus city for: China Southern Airlines
- Elevation AMSL: 2,103 m (6,900 ft)
- Coordinates: 25°06′7″N 102°55′45″E
- Website: km.ynairport.com

Maps
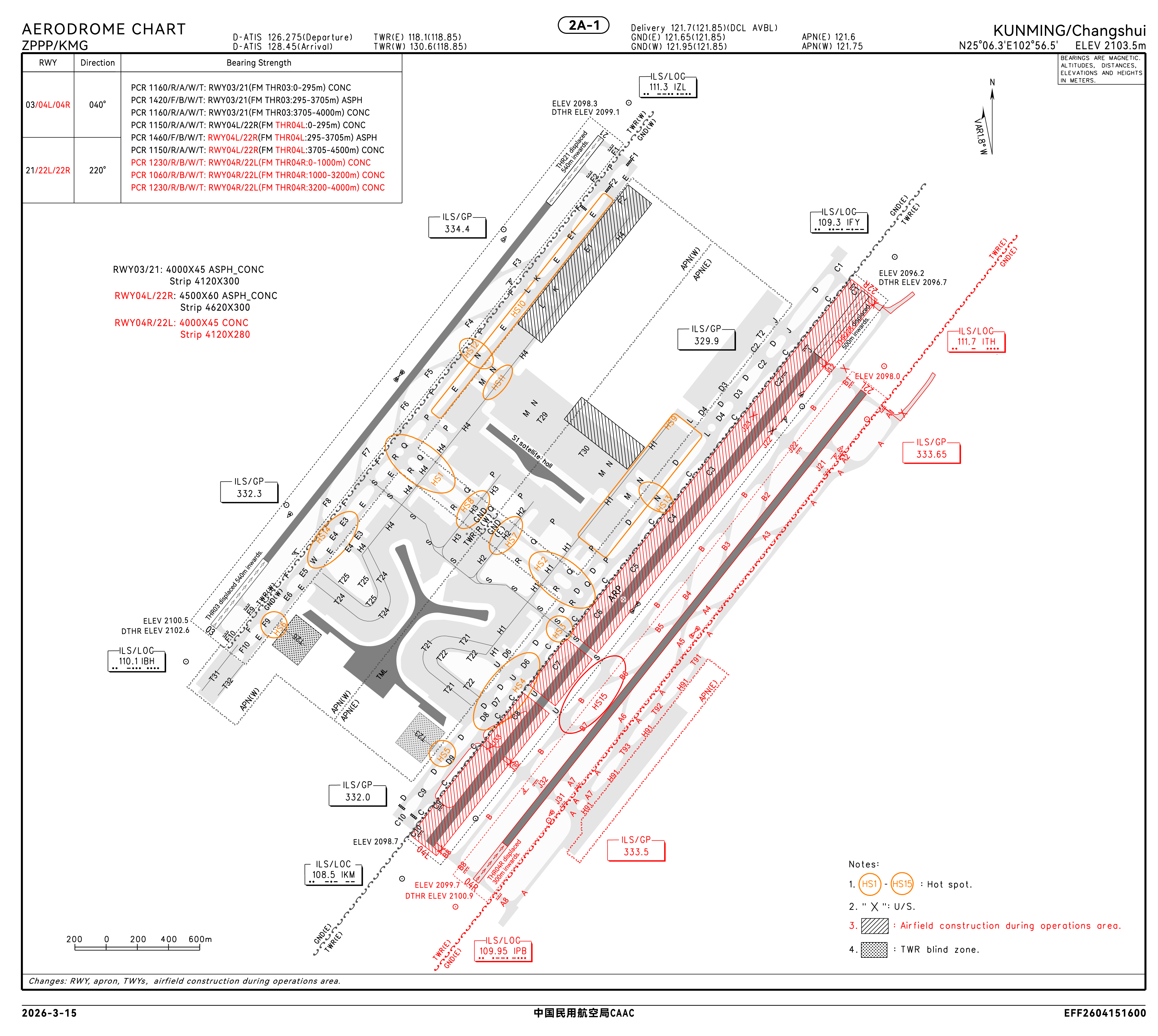
- CAAC airport chart

- Location in Yunnan Location in China

Runways
Direction	Length		Surface
Direction	m	ft	Surface
03/21	4,000	13,123	Asphalt
04L/22R	4,500	14,764	Asphalt
04R/22L	4,000	13,123	Concrete (Under construction)

Statistics (2025)
- Passengers: 49,705,725 ▲5.4%
- Cargo (tonnes): 41,3244.84 ▲7.2%
- Aircraft movements: 340,867 ▲3.4%

Kunming Changshui International Airport
- Simplified Chinese: 昆明长水国际机场
- Traditional Chinese: 昆明長水國際機場
Transcriptions
Standard Mandarin
- Hanyu Pinyin: Kūnmíng Chángshuǐ Guójì Jīchǎng
- Wade–Giles: Kʻun^{1}-ming^{2} Chʻang^{2}-shui^{3} Kuo^{2}-chi^{4} Chi^{1}-chʻang^{3}

Kunming Changshui International Airport (IATA: KMG, ICAO: ZPPP) is an international airport serving Kunming, the capital of Southwestern China's Yunnan province. The airport is located 24.5 km (15.2 mi) northeast of the city center in a graded mountainous area about 2,100 m (6,900 ft) above sea level. The airport opened at 08:00 (UTC+8) on 28 June 2012, replacing the old Kunming Wujiaba International Airport, which was later demolished. As a gateway to Southeast and South Asia, Changshui Airport is a hub for China Eastern Airlines, Kunming Airlines, Lucky Air, Sichuan Airlines and Ruili Airlines.

The new airport has two runways (versus the single runway at Wujiaba), and handled over 47,000,000 passengers in 2024, making it the 47th busiest airport in the world and 4th busiest airport in China by passenger traffic.

In 2025, the airport's passenger throughput reached 49.7057 million, ranking tenth among airports in China.

The main terminal was designed by architectural firm SOM with engineering firm Arup.

== History ==
Construction began in 2009. At the time, the facility was reported to be named the Zheng He International Airport, named after Zheng He, a Chinese mariner, explorer, and diplomat.

The very short construction time was marred by two separate incidents. The first occurred on January 3, 2010, when seven construction workers died as an incomplete overpass collapsed. On June 28, 2011, 11 workers were injured when a tunnel that was under construction collapsed.

Construction of the airport's main terminal was completed by July 2011.

== Facilities ==
=== Terminal ===
The main 548,300 m^{2} (5,901,852 sq ft) terminal of Changshui International Airport is the second largest terminal building in China. The terminal has 66 gates with jet bridges. A total of 88 gates are available.

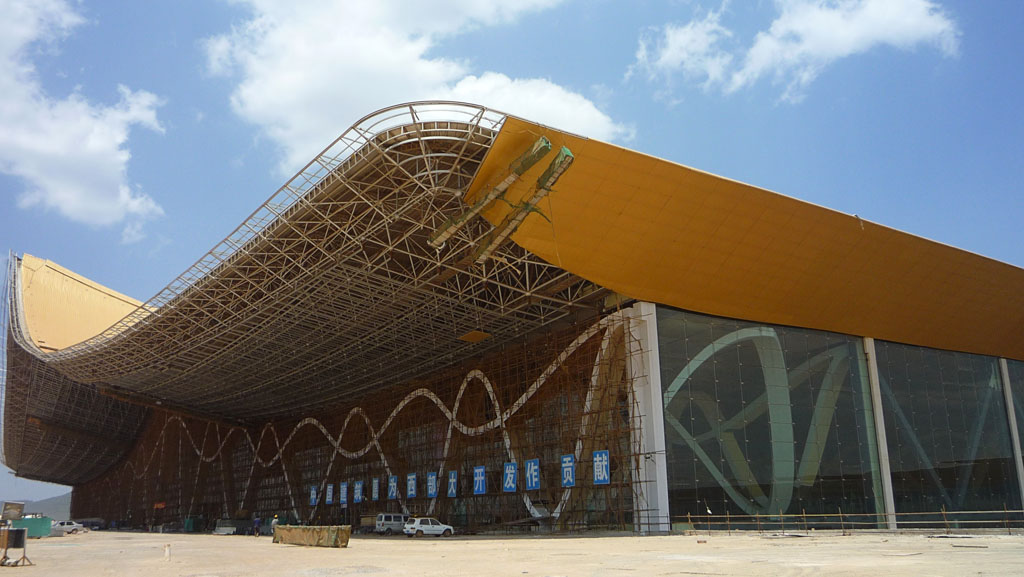
The new terminal under construction in April 2011

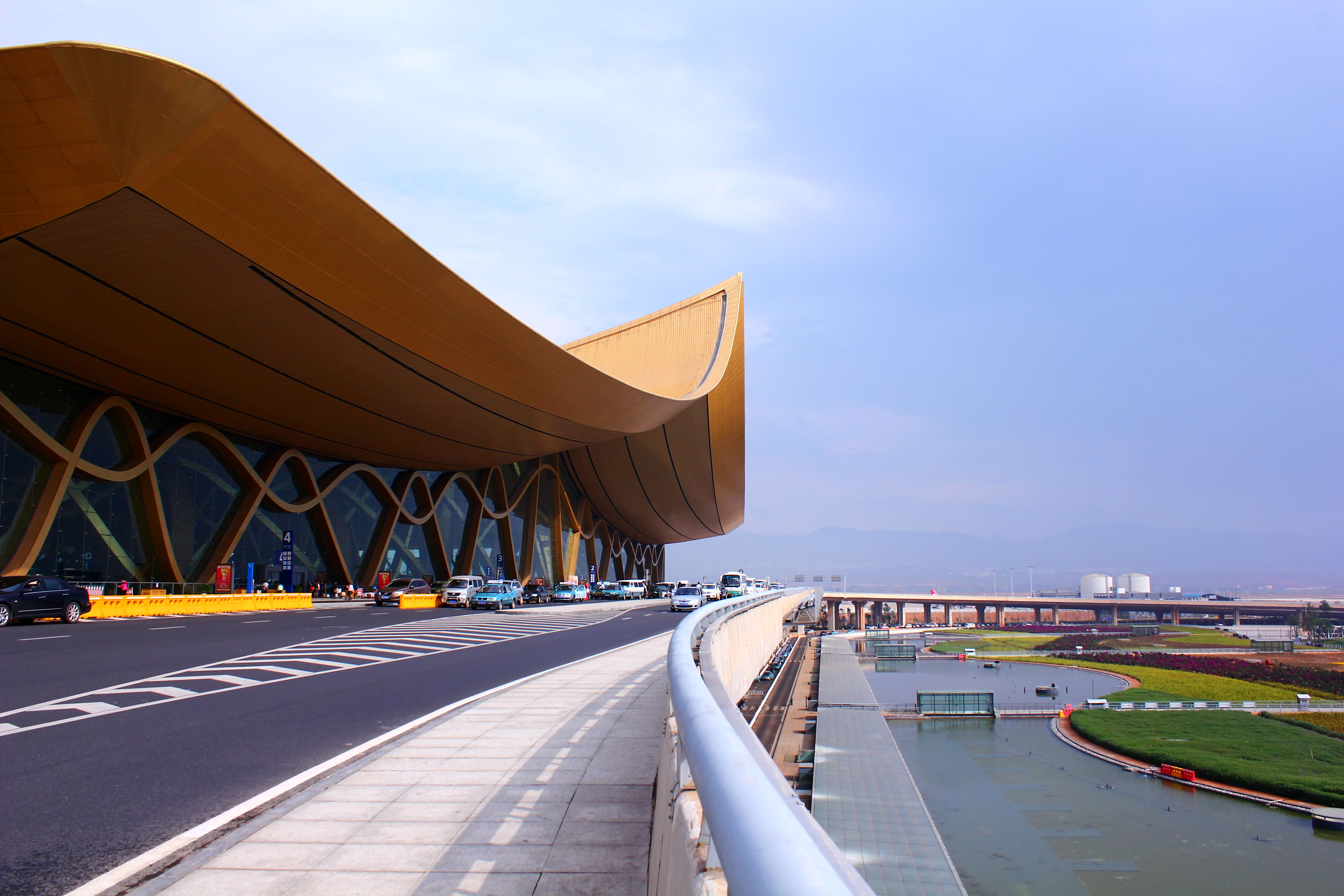
Curbside

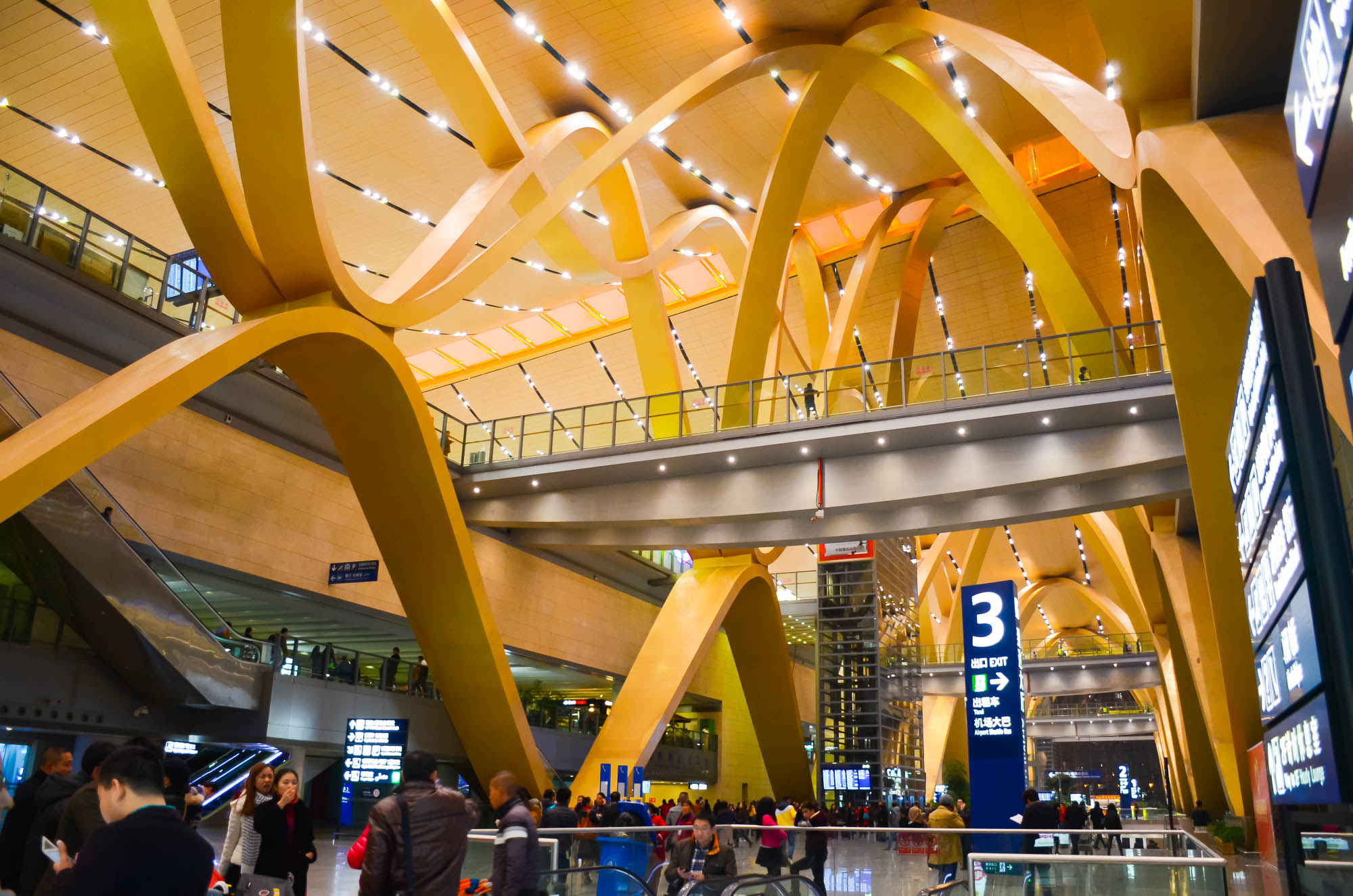
Arrivals lounge of Kunming Changshui International Airport

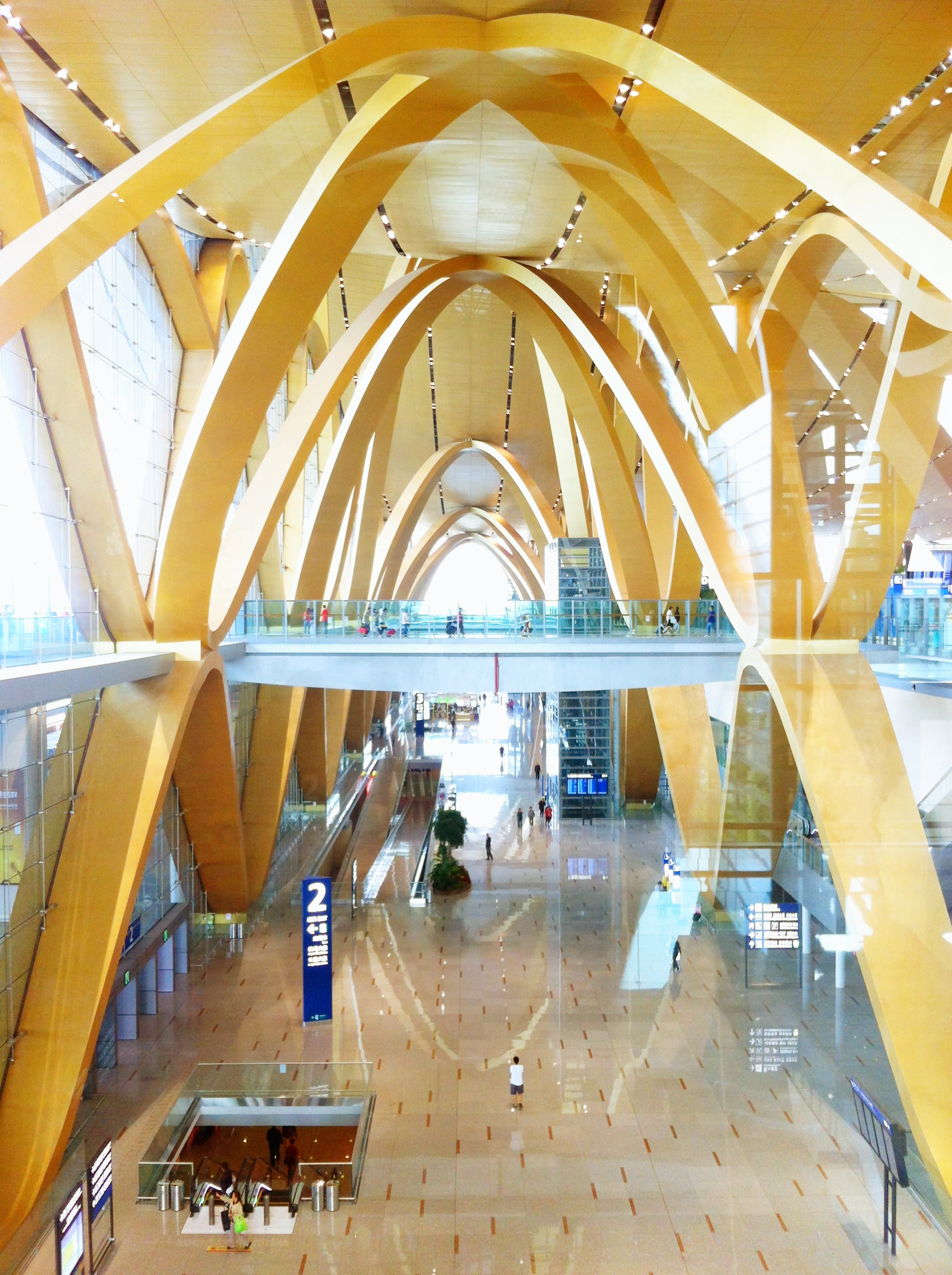
Interior view

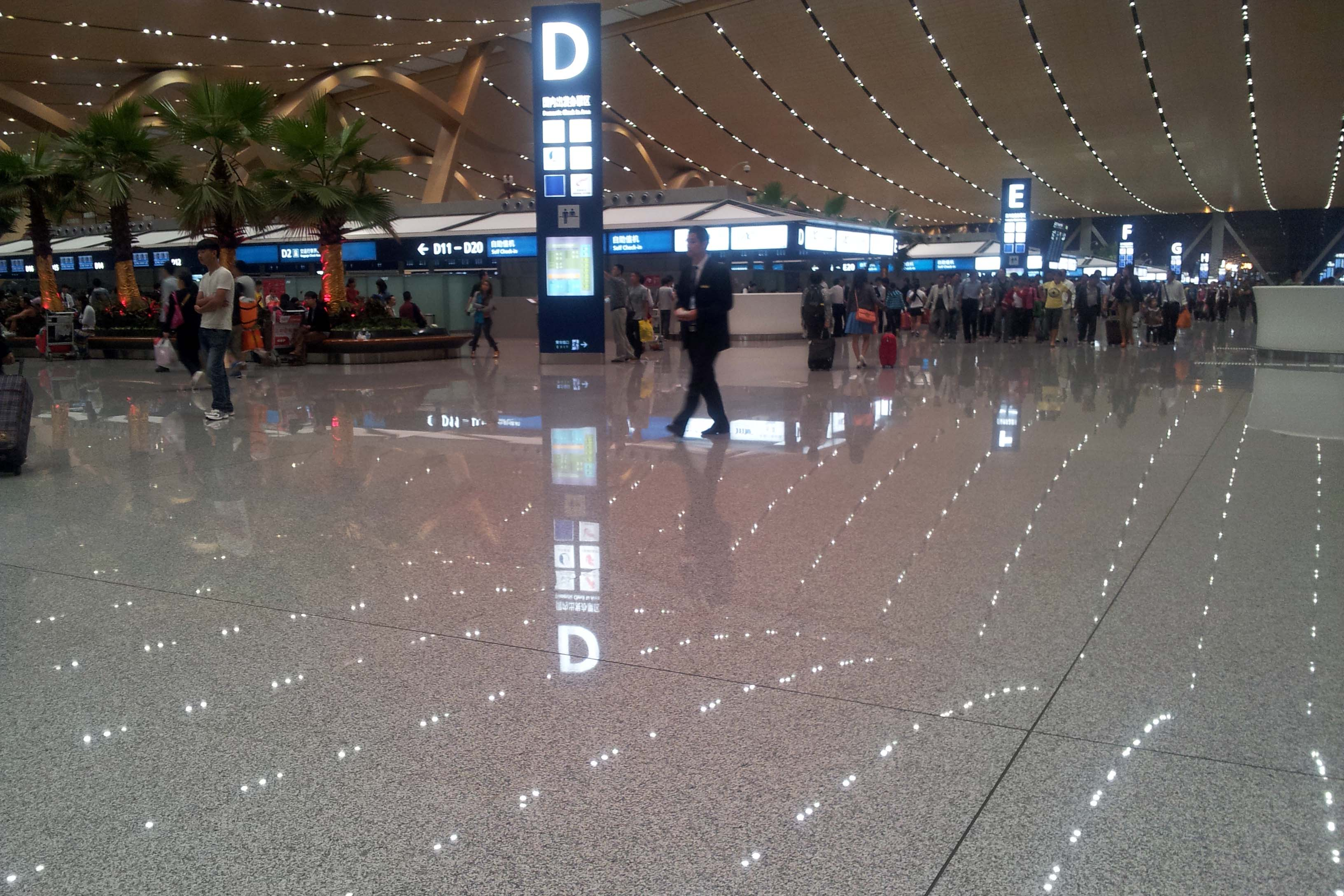
Check-in facilities

=== Runways ===
Kunming Changshui International Airport now has two runways. The east runway is 4.5 kilometers (14,763 ft 9 in) long while the west runway is 4 kilometers (13,123 ft 4 in) long.

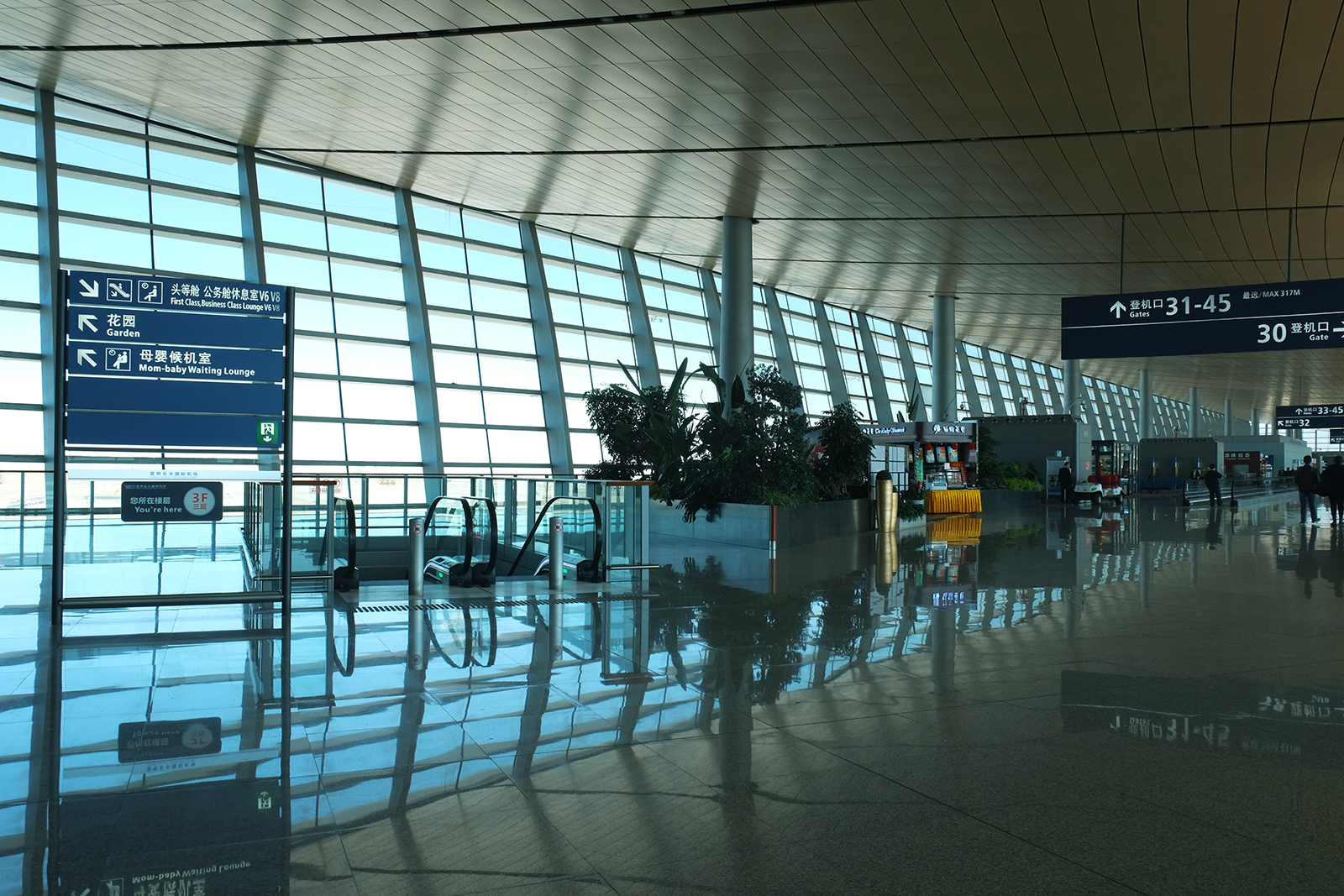
Waiting area of Kunming Changshui International Airport

=== A-CDM ===
In July 2014, Kunming airport signed an agreement with the aviation data service company VariFlight regarding the Airport Collaborative Decision Making system (A-CDM) installation in order to improve the efficiency of its operations, reduce fuel consumption and other expenses. Kunming airport became the first aviation hub in China to implement such an information system. In 2017, the airport's on-time performance reached 85.3%.

=== People mover ===
Trams are used as people movers at Changshui Airport, they are nicknamed "Green Dolphin". The tram line is currently 1.88 km long and runs mostly straight, partly under the aircraft taxiway.

=== Parking lots ===
The airport parking building area is divided into B2 and B3 level, with a total of 2,883 parking lots.

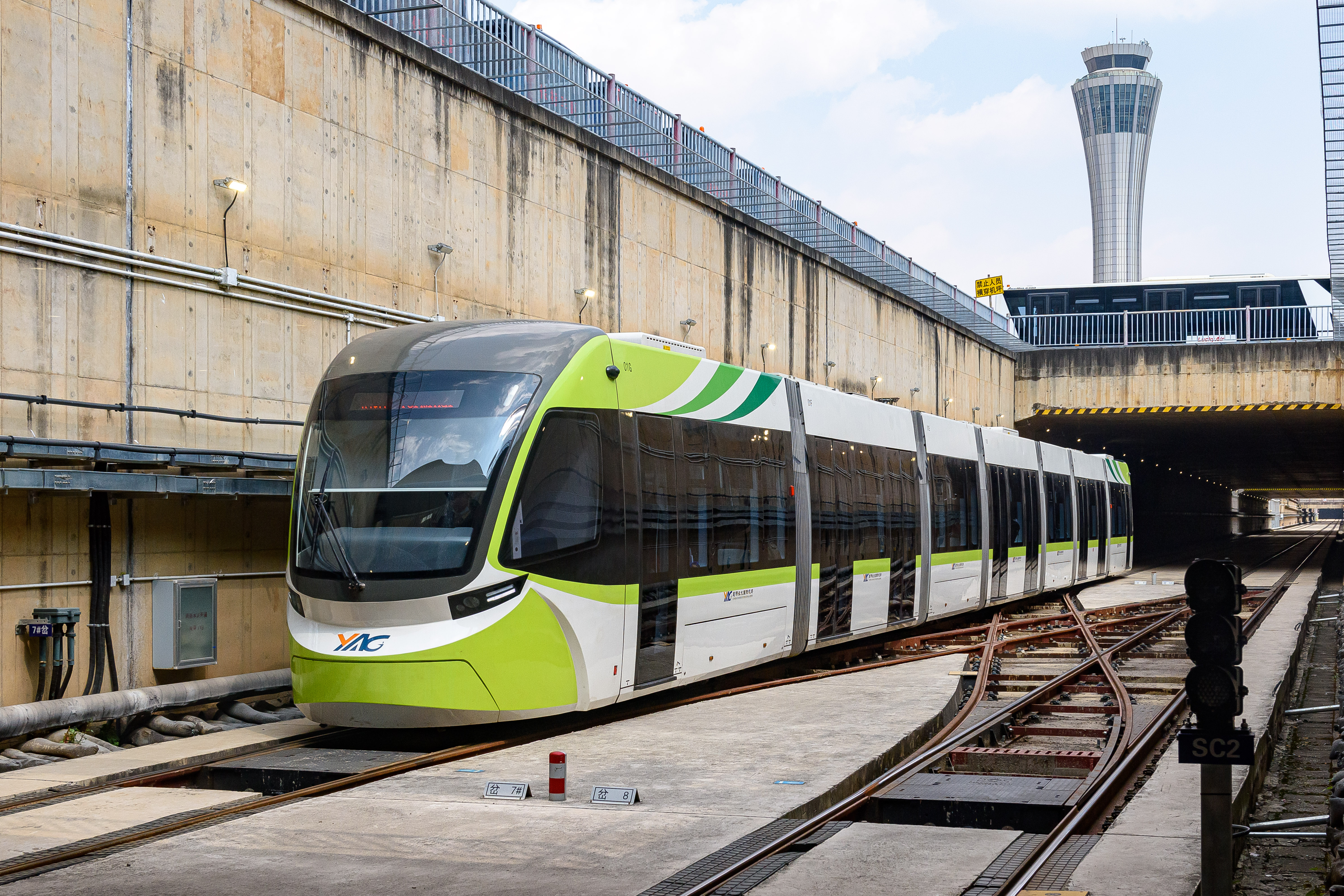
Trams are used as people movers at Changshui Airport.

== Airlines and destinations ==
=== Passenger ===
Airlines	Destinations
9 Air	Guangzhou
Air China	Beijing–Capital, Beijing–Daxing, Chengdu–Shuangliu, Chengdu–Tianfu, Dalian, Hangzhou, Harbin, Shanghai–Pudong, Shenyang, Shiyan, Tianjin, Yangon
Air Guilin	Shenyang, Xuzhou, Zhangjiajie
Air Travel	Changchun, Changsha, Chengdu–Tianfu, Hailar, Hohhot, Jining, Lanzhou, Liancheng, Nanchang, Nanjing, Qingdao, Shangrao, Shenyang, Tongren, Turpan, Wenzhou, Wuxi, Zhengzhou, Zhoushan
AirAsia	Kuala Lumpur–International, Johor Bahru
Batik Air Malaysia	Kuala Lumpur–International; Charter: Kuala Lumpur–Subang, Penang, Kuching(Begins 3 March 2027)
Beijing Capital Airlines	Beijing–Daxing, Hangzhou, Harbin, Qingdao, Shaoguan
Chengdu Airlines	Chengdu–Tianfu
China Eastern Airlines	Bangkok–Suvarnabhumi, Baoshan, Beijing–Daxing, Cangyuan, Changchun, Changsha, Changzhou, Chengdu–Shuangliu, Chengdu–Tianfu, Chiang Mai, Chongqing, Colombo–Bandaranaike, Dali, Dalian, Datong, Dhaka, Diqing, Dubai–International, Fuyang, Fuzhou, Guangzhou, Handan, Hangzhou, Hanoi, Harbin, Hefei, Ho Chi Minh City, Hohhot, Hong Kong, Huai'an, Huangshan, Jiaxing, Jieyang, Jinan, Jinggangshan, Kathmandu, Kolkata, Kuala Lumpur–International, Lancang, Lanzhou, Lhasa, Lianyungang, Lijiang, Lincang, Luang Prabang, Luoyang, Luzhou, Malé, Mandalay, Mangshi, Nanchang, Nanchong, Nanjing, Nanning, Ningbo, Ninglang, Ordos, Phnom Penh, Phuket, Qingdao, Rizhao, Sanming, Sanya, Seoul–Incheon, Shanghai–Hongqiao, Shanghai–Pudong, Shenyang, Shenzhen, Siem Reap, Singapore, Taiyuan, Taizhou, Tengchong, Tianjin, Tokyo–Narita, Ürümqi, Vientiane, Wenzhou, Wuhan, Wuxi, Xiamen, Xi'an, Xining, Xinyang, Xishuangbanna, Yangon, Yantai, Yibin, Yichang, Yinchuan, Yiwu, Yongzhou, Yulin (Shaanxi), Zhanjiang, Zhaotong, Zhengzhou, Zhuhai
China Express Airlines	Quzhou, Tianjin, Yan'an
China Southern Airlines	Beijing–Daxing, Changchun, Changsha, Dalian, Guangzhou, Haikou, Harbin, Jieyang, Lanzhou, Sanya, Shanghai–Pudong, Shenyang, Shenzhen, Ürümqi, Wuhan, Zhengzhou, Zhuhai
China United Airlines	Beijing–Daxing, Lüliang, Qionghai, Shijiazhuang, Wenzhou
Chongqing Airlines	Chongqing
Dalian Airlines	Dalian
Donghai Airlines	Changzhi, Lishui, Qingdao, Shenzhen
Fuzhou Airlines	Fuzhou
GX Airlines	Haikou
Greater Bay Airlines	Hong Kong
Hainan Airlines	Beijing–Capital, Changsha, Dalian, Haikou, Lanzhou, Shenzhen, Xi'an
Hebei Airlines	Beijing–Daxing, Shijiazhuang
Jiangxi Air	Nanchang
Juneyao Air	Bijie, Hangzhou, Nanjing, Shanghai–Hongqiao, Shanghai–Pudong
Korean Air	Seoul–Incheon
Kunming Airlines	Bangkok–Suvarnabhumi, Beijing–Capital, Changsha, Changzhou, Chengdu–Tianfu, Guangzhou, Haikou, Hangzhou, Hanzhong, Harbin, Ho Chi Minh City, Huaihua, Huizhou, Jinan, Jingzhou, Linyi, Mangshi, Nanjing, Nantong, Phuket, Shanghai–Pudong, Shenzhen, Shijiazhuang, Taiyuan, Tengchong, Wuhan, Xiamen, Xi'an, Xiangyang, Yangzhou, Zhengzhou
Loong Air	Changchun, Hangzhou, Linyi, Shenyang, Xuzhou
Lucky Air	Bangkok–Suvarnabhumi, Beijing–Capital, Bengbu, Changchun, Chengdu–Tianfu, Chongqing, Dalian,, Diqing, Fuzhou, Ganzhou, Guangzhou, Haiphong, Haikou, Hangzhou, Harbin, Hefei, Hohhot, Huai'an, Jakarta–Soekarno-Hatta, Jieyang, Jinan, Lancang, Lanzhou, Lhasa, Lijiang, Luang Prabang, Malé, Mangshi, Mianyang, Nanchang, Nanjing, Ningbo, Penang, Qingdao, Quanzhou, Sanya, Shanghai–Hongqiao, Shanghai-Pudong, Shenzhen, Shijiazhuang, Sihanoukville, Taiyuan, Tengchong, Tianjin, Ürümqi, Vientiane, Wenzhou, Wuhan, Wuxi, Xiamen, Xingtai, Xi'an, Xining, Xuzhou, Yancheng, Yichang, Zhengzhou, Zhuhai; Charter: Daegu
Myanmar National Airlines	Mandalay, Yangon
Okay Airways	Changsha, Hefei, Nanjing, Tianjin, Wuhan
Ruili Airlines	Baotou, Chengdu–Tianfu, Chiang Mai, Dalian, Enshi, Fuzhou, Hai Phong, Hangzhou, Harbin, Jiayuguan, Lanzhou, Mangshi, Nanyang, Ningbo, Phu Quoc, Qingdao, Qionghai, Quanzhou, Shenyang, Sihanoukville, Taiyuan, Tangshan, Tianjin, Wenzhou, Wuhan, Wuxi, Xi'an, Xiangxi, Xining, Xinzhou, Zhanjiang; Charter: Turpan
Scoot	Singapore
Shandong Airlines	Jinan, Jingdezhen, Nanjing, Qingdao, Shenyang, Ürümqi, Xiamen, Yuncheng
Shanghai Airlines	Bozhou, Changchun, Changsha, Hengyang, Jieyang, Shanghai–Hongqiao, Shanghai–Pudong, Xishuangbanna, Zhengzhou
Shenzhen Airlines	Guangzhou, Harbin, Nanchang, Shenzhen, Zhengzhou
Sichuan Airlines	Bazhong, Beijing–Capital, Changchun, Changsha, Changzhou, Chengdu–Shuangliu, Chengdu–Tianfu, Chongqing, Dalian, Dunhuang, Guangyuan, Guangzhou, Hangzhou, Harbin, Hefei, Huizhou, Jinan, Lanzhou, Lhasa, Lianyungang, Linfen, Nanjing, Ningbo, Qingdao, Shanghai–Pudong, Shenyang, Tianjin, Ürümqi, Vientiane, Wanzhou, Xiamen, Xi'an, Xining, Xuzhou, Yinchuan, Zhengzhou, Zhongwei
Spring Airlines	Changde, Mangshi, Ningbo, Qianjiang, Shanghai–Hongqiao, Shanghai–Pudong, Shijiazhuang, Yangzhou
Thai AirAsia	Bangkok–Don Mueang
Thai Airways International	Bangkok–Suvarnabhumi
Tianjin Airlines	Haikou, Tianjin, Xi'an
Vietnam Airlines	Ho Chi Minh City
West Air	Hefei, Nanjing, Zhengzhou
XiamenAir	Fuzhou, Hangzhou, Quanzhou, Xiamen
Xizang Airlines	Chengdu–Shuangliu, Jinan, Lhasa, Mangshi, Qamdo, Xi'an, Yuncheng

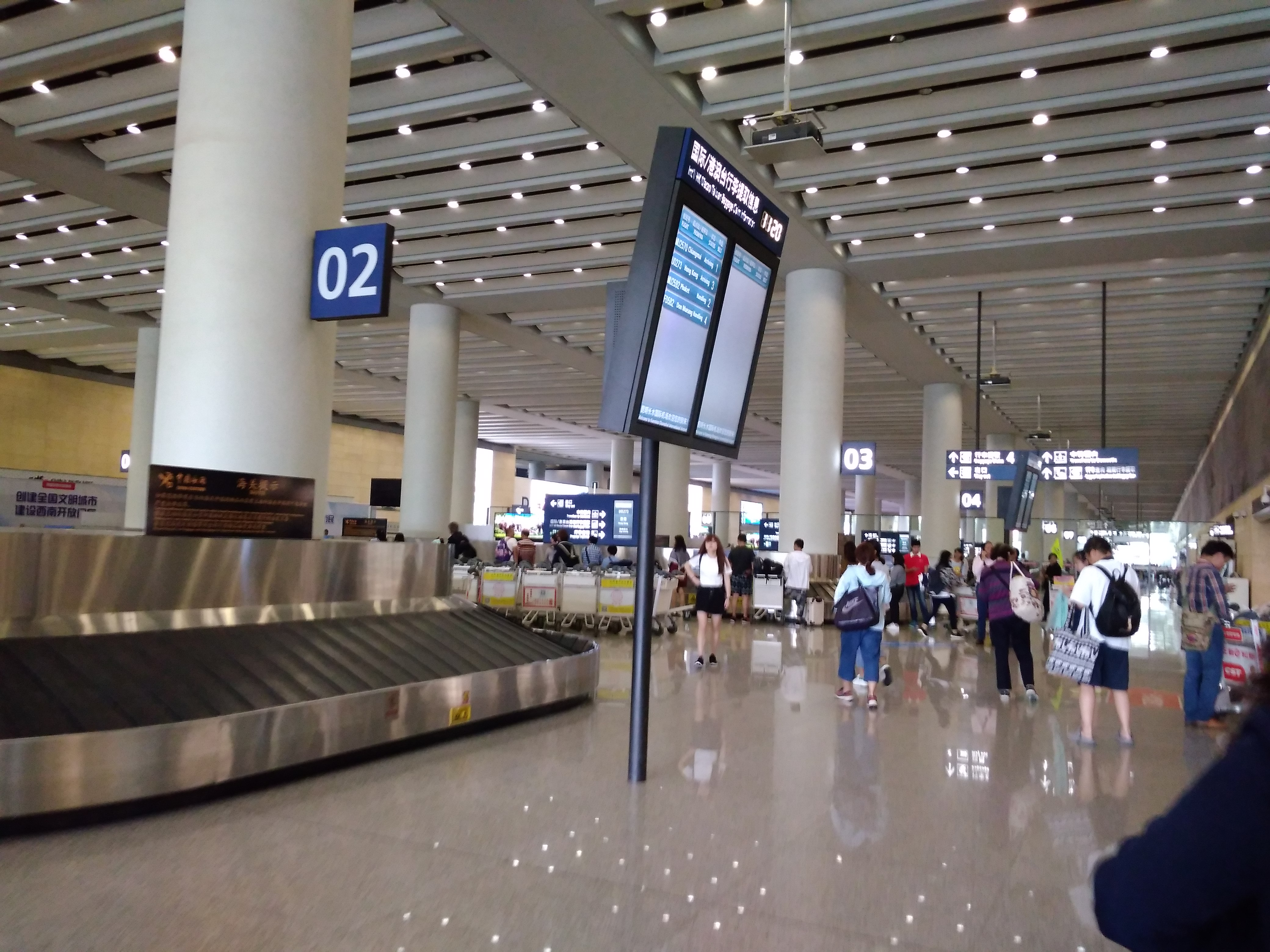
Baggage claim area

=== Cargo ===
Airlines	Destinations
IndiGo CarGo	Kolkata
SF Airlines	Colombo–Bandaranaike
YTO Cargo Airlines	Bengaluru, Karachi, Lahore

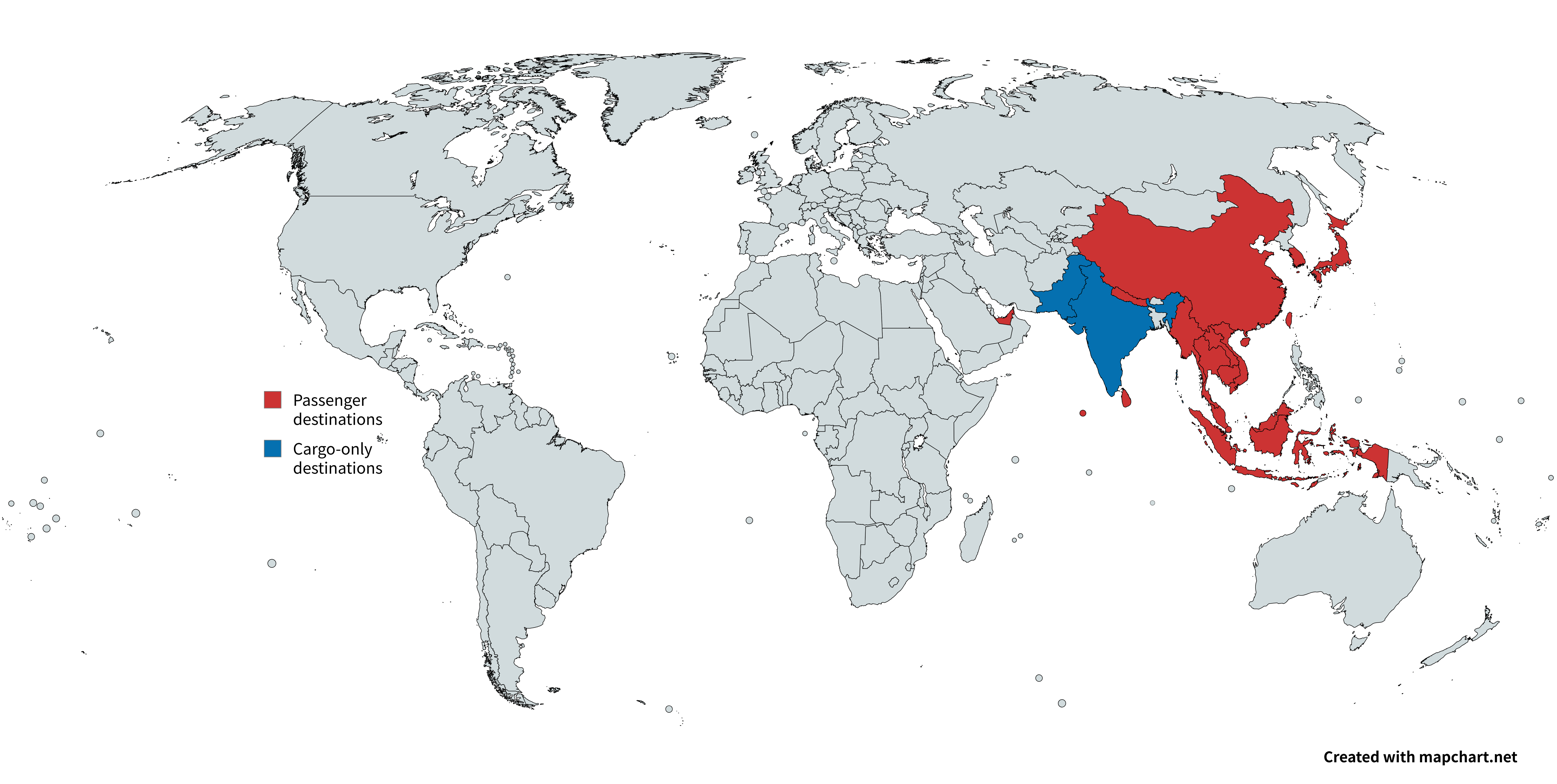
Red for passenger destinations, blue for cargo-only destinations. As of February 2026.

== Ground transportation ==
=== Car ===
The airport is connected to Kunming’s urban area via an expressway network, centered on the Airport Expressway (S92), which links the airport with the city and surrounding areas.

=== Metro ===
Kunming Metro Line 6 serves Kunming Changshui International Airport, with Kunming Airport Station located beneath Terminal 1 at the B2 level.

Line 6 provides a direct rail connection between the airport and Kunming’s urban area. The line opened together with the airport in 2012 and was later extended westward; since the completion of Phase 2 in September 2020, its western terminus has been Tangzixiang station, closer to Kunming’s city center.

Train operating hours are generally from 06:20 to 23:00.

=== Airport Shuttle ===
Kunming Changshui International Airport is served by airport shuttle bus services (branded as Airport Shuttle/空港快线), connecting the airport with Kunming Railway Station and Kunming South Railway Station.

Buses depart from the B1 level of Terminal 1, near Gates 3 and 4, with a fare of CN¥25 per person per trip.

Route	Boarding Point	Via/Destination	Hours	Frequency
Kunming Railway Station	Airport	Xinying Neighborhood, Taili Hotel, Kunming Railway Station	8:00-2:00 the next day	Every 30-60 minutes; after 23:00, bus departs when full.
Kunming Railway Station	Kunming Railway Station - City Terminal	Non-stop to Airport	5:00-23:00	Every 40-60 minutes
Kunming South Railway Station	Airport	Non-stop to Kunming South Railway Station - North Entrance	9:40-17:00	30 minutes, or departs when full
Kunming South Railway Station	Kunming South Railway Station - East Square	Non-stop to Airport	10:30-20:00	30 minutes, or departs when full

=== Long-distance coach ===
A long-distance coach station is located approximately west of Gate B14 of Terminal 1. The airport is served by dozens of daily coach services to surrounding cities and counties in Yunnan Province, including Anning, Yuxi, Wenshan, Qujing and Mile, among others.

=== City bus ===
At present [when?], regular city bus routes 269, Z78, and flexible-demand service L04 serve the airport, stopping at the B1-level bus stops of Terminal 1. These routes mainly serve airport-related facilities, operational areas, and the Changshui Hangcheng residential area to the east of the airport.

== Statistics ==
Annual traffic statistics at Kunming Changshui International Airport
Year	Passengers	% change	Aircraft movements	Cargo (tons)
2012	23,979,259	▲7.7%	201,338	262,272.3
2013	29,688,297	▲23.8%	255,546	293,627.7
2014	32,230,883	▲8.6%	270,529	316,672.4
2015	37,523,098	▲16.4%	300,406	355,422.8
2016	41,980,339	▲11.9%	325,934	382,854.3
2017	44,727,691	▲6.5%	350,273	418,033.6
2018	47,088,140	▲5.3%	360,785	428,292.1
2019	48,075,978	▲2.1%	357,080	415,776.3
2020	32,989,127	▼31.4%	274,433	324,989.8
2021	32,221,295	▼2.3%	279,471	377,225.4
2022	21,237,520	▼34.1%	193,788	310,122.2
2023	42,033,527	▲97.9%	318,586	350,469.0
2024	47,178,347	▲12.2%	329,602	385,625.0
2025	49,705,725	▲5.4%	340,867	413,244.8

== See also ==
- List of airports in China
- List of the busiest airports in China
