= YCU =

YCU may refer to:

- Yokohama City University, Japan
- Yuncheng Guangong Airport (IATA code), Shanxi Province, China
