= Lancang Jingmai Airport =

Lancang Jingmai Airport 澜沧景迈机场
- IATA: JMJ; ICAO: ZPJM

Summary
- Airport type: Public
- Serves: Lancang, Yunnan
- Location: Donghui Township
- Opened: 26 May 2017; 9 years ago
- Elevation AMSL: 1,350 m (4,430 ft)
- Coordinates: 22°24′57″N 099°47′11″E

Map
- Location of airport in Yunnan

Runways
Direction	Length		Surface
Direction	m	ft	Surface
12/30	2,600	8,530

Statistics (2021)
- Passengers: 419,435
- Aircraft movements: 5,090
- Cargo (metric tons): 279.6

Lancang Jingmai Airport
- Simplified Chinese: 澜沧景迈机场
- Traditional Chinese: 瀾滄景邁機場
Transcriptions
Standard Mandarin
- Hanyu Pinyin: Láncāng Jǐngmài Jīchǎng

Lancang Jingmai Airport (IATA: JMJ, ICAO: ZPJM) is an airport serving Lancang Lahu Autonomous County in Pu'er, Yunnan province, southwest China. The airport is located in Donghui Township (东回乡), 30 kilometres (19 mi) from the county seat of Lancang. Menglian and Ximeng counties are also nearby. The airport received approval from the State Council and the Central Military Commission of China in January 2013. It is expected to cost 1.514 billion yuan to build. The airport opened on 26 May 2017.

== Facilities ==
The airport has a 2,600-meter runway (class 4C), and four aircraft parking spots. It is designed to handle 250,000 passengers and 750 tons of cargo per year by 2020.

== Airlines and destinations ==
Airlines	Destinations
China Eastern Airlines	Kunming
China Express Airlines	Guiyang, Mangshi
Lucky Air	Kunming
Xizang Airlines	Chengdu-Tianfu

== See also ==
- List of airports in China
- List of the busiest airports in China
