= Ruili Airlines =

Chinese low-cost airline

Sunan Ruili Airlines Co., Ltd.

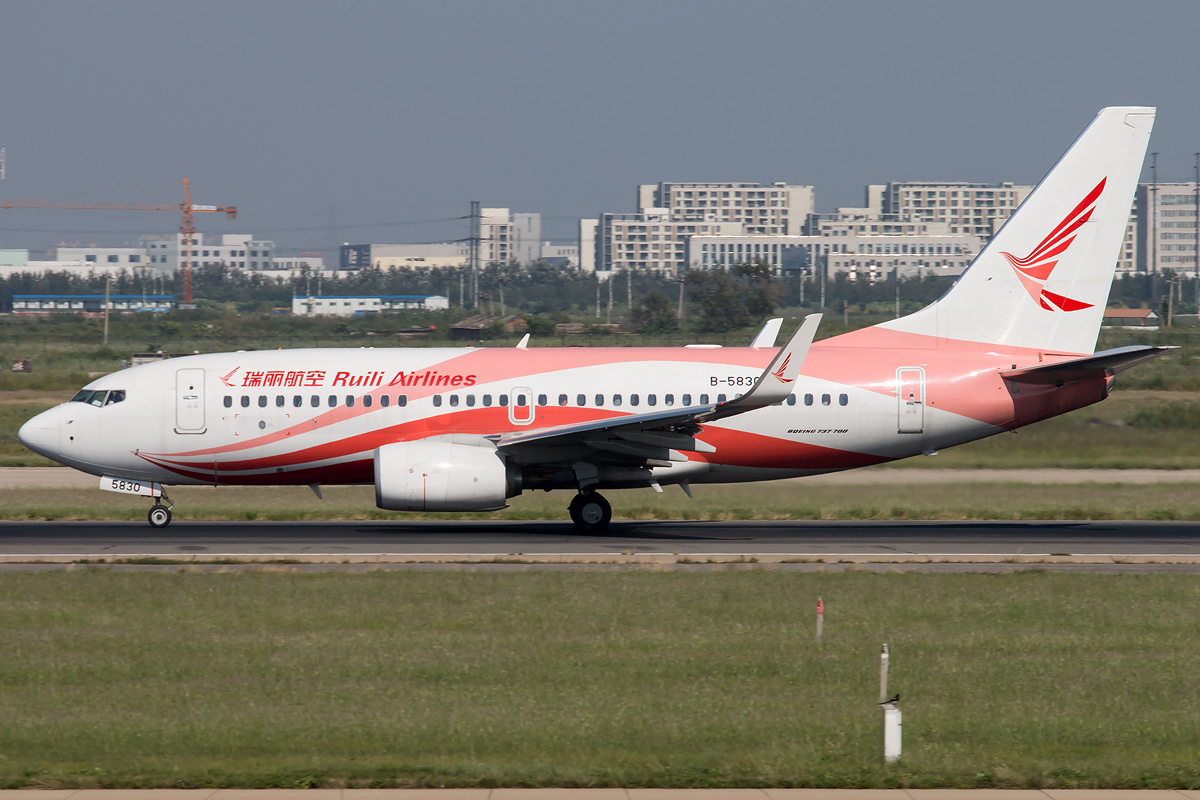
IATA	ICAO	Call sign
DR	RLH	SENDI
- Founded: 2014; 12 years ago
- Hubs: Kunming Changshui
- Secondary hubs: Wuxi Shuofang; Dehong Mangshi
- Focus cities: Chengdu
- Fleet size: 28
- Destinations: 34
- Parent company: Wuxi Traffic Industry Group
- Headquarters: Wuxi, Jiangsu, China
- Key people: Ye Yajuan (Chairman)
- Website: http://www.rlair.net/

Sunan Ruili Airlines Co., Ltd.
- Simplified Chinese: 苏南瑞丽航空公司
- Traditional Chinese: 蘇南瑞麗航空公司
Transcriptions
Standard Mandarin
- Hanyu Pinyin: Sū Nán Ruìlì Hángkōng gōngsī

Sunan Ruili Airlines Co., Ltd., branded as Ruili Airlines is a Chinese low-cost carrier headquartered at Wuxi Shuofang Airport, with hubs at Kunming Changshui International Airport and focus city in Dehong Mangshi International Airport. It provides both domestic and international services to destinations within China and elsewhere in Southeast Asia.

== History ==
The airline was established in 2014 as Ruili Airlines Co., Ltd. and is wholly owned by the Jingcheng Group. It received its air operator's certificate on 22 January 2014 and flew its first service on 18 May 2014, between Kunming and Mangshi. Five Boeing 787-9s were ordered in 2016, but as of 2025, none had been delivered.

On 15 January 2021, Ruili Airlines completed the industrial and commercial change registration. Wuxi Traffic Group became the new controlling shareholder of Ruili Airlines with a shareholding ratio of 57%. The holding ratio of Jingcheng Group decreased to 13%, and the remaining 30% of the equity was held by Dong Lecheng, president of Jingcheng Group and chairman of Ruili Airlines.

On 28 March 2021, Ruili Airlines announced that the acquisition process was completed, and for the first time, it was officially announced that it was a holding subsidiary of Wuxi Transportation Industry Group.

On 18 October 2021, the airlines officially changed its registered name from Ruili Airlines Co., Ltd. to Sunan Ruili Airlines Co., Ltd.

== Destinations ==
As of March 2018, the airline served 34 destinations in China and in Southeast Asia.

== Fleet ==
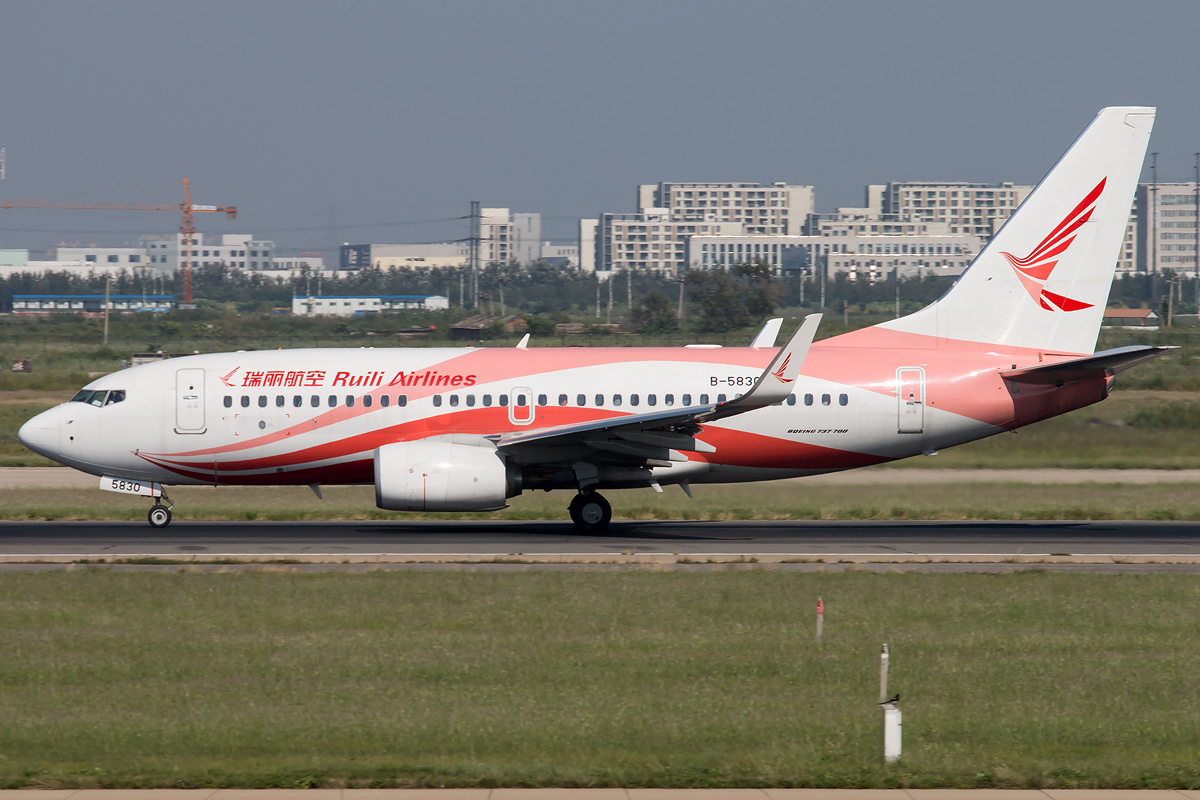
Ruili Airlines Boeing 737-700 taxiing at Tianjin Binhai International Airport

=== Current fleet ===
As of May 2026, Ruili Airlines operates an all-Boeing fleet composed of the following aircraft:

Ruili Airlines fleet
Aircraft	In service	Orders	Passengers			Notes
Aircraft	In service	Orders	J	Y	Total	Notes
Boeing 737-700	7	—	—	144	144	
Boeing 737-800	21	—	8	156	164	Ex-Shenzhen Airlines aircraft.
Boeing 737-800	21	—	8	162	170	Ex-China Eastern Airlines aircraft
Boeing 737-800	21	—	8	168	176	Ex-Air Berlin aircraft.
Boeing 737-800	21	—	4	180	184	
Boeing 737-800	21	—	—	186	186	
Boeing 737-800	21	—	–	189	189	
Boeing 737 MAX	—	36	TBA			Unspecified variants.
Boeing 787-9	—	6	TBA			
Total	28	42				

=== Fleet development ===
The airline received its two Boeing 737-700s from Air Berlin (formerly D-ABLE and D-ABLF) on 6 January 2014. However, the aircraft were returned to Southwest Airlines in May 2015. The first 737-800 was received on 30 March 2014, and the direct purchase Boeing 737-700 from Boeing was received on 25 November 2014. It has orders and commitments for a further 13 Boeing 737 aircraft (seven Boeing 737-700s and six Boeing 737 MAXs).

In mid 2015, the airline signed a commitment to purchase and lease 60 Boeing 737 MAX aircraft, subject to final negotiations.

In July 2016, Ruili Airlines finalized an order for six Boeing 787-9 aircraft. The deal was worth US$1.59 billion.
