= Kunming Airlines =

Chinese airline

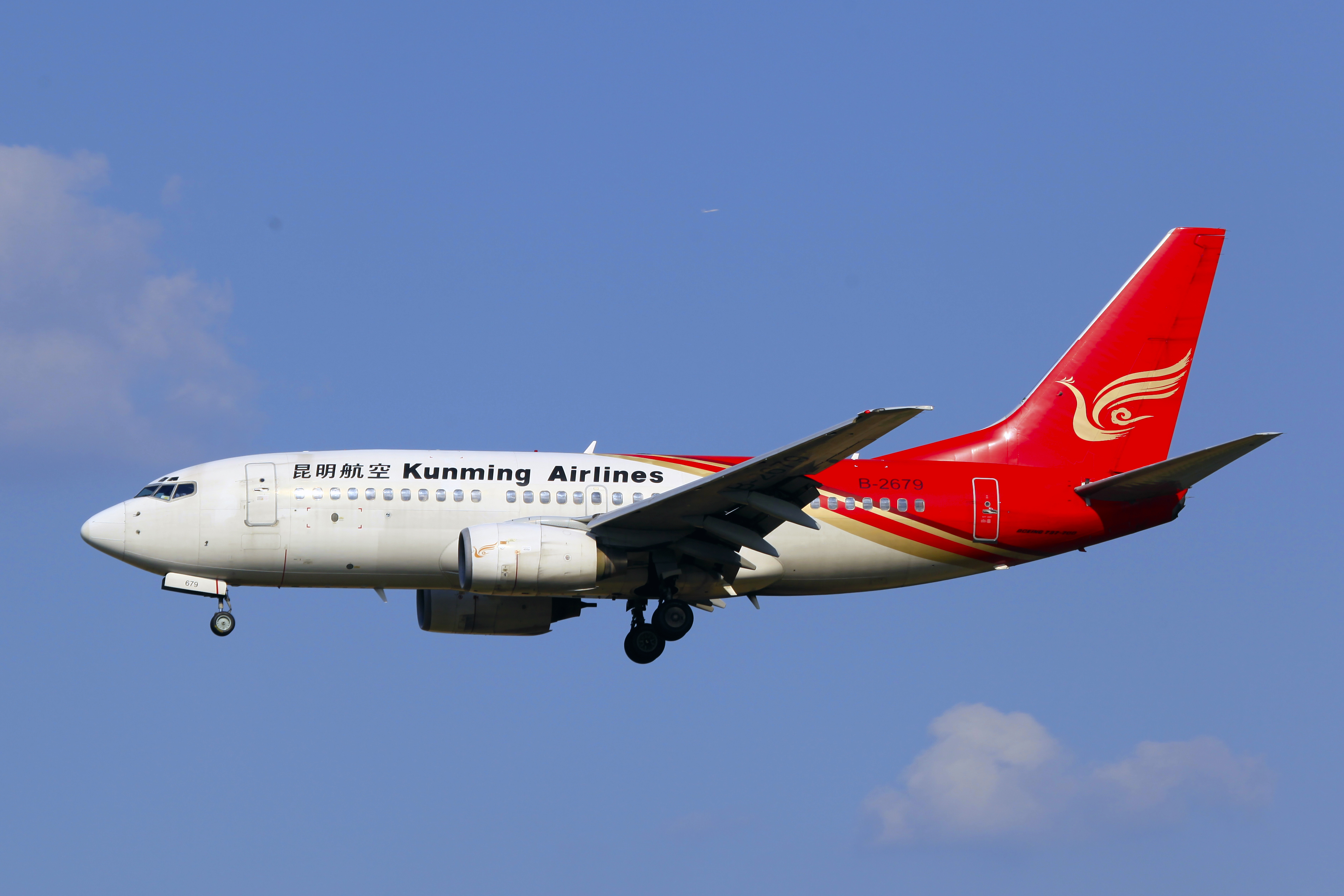
IATA	ICAO	Call sign
KY	KNA	KUNMING AIR
- Founded: December 2005; 20 years ago
- Commenced operations: January 2009; 17 years ago
- Hubs: Kunming Changshui International Airport
- Frequent-flyer program: Phoenix Miles
- Fleet size: 32
- Destinations: 37
- Parent company: Shenzhen Airlines (80%)
- Headquarters: Kunming, Yunnan
- Key people: Wang Qingmin (CEO)
- Website: www.airkunming.com

Kunming Airlines
- Chinese: 昆明航空公司
Transcriptions
Standard Mandarin
- Hanyu Pinyin: Kūnmíng Hángkōng Gōngsī
- Wade–Giles: Kun1-ming2 Hang2-kʻung1 Kung1-ssŭ1

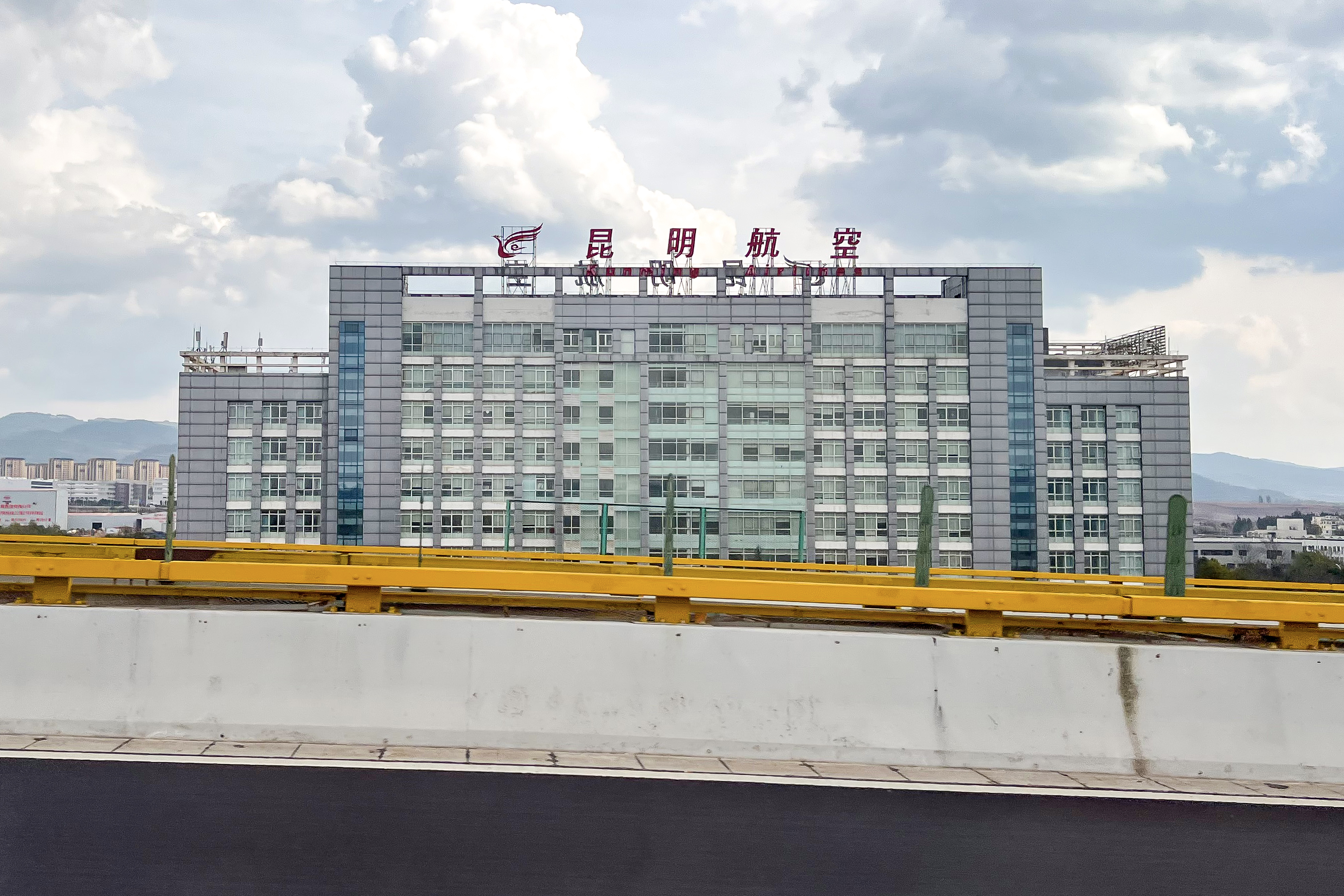
Headquarters

Kunming Airlines is a Chinese airline based in Kunming, Yunnan province, and established in 2005.

== History ==
In December 2005, the Civil Aviation Administration of China (CAAC) said it would soon approve operation of the private airline Kunming Airlines, which has a registered capital of RMB80 million, and plans to be based at Kunming Wujiaba International Airport.

As of January 2009, Kunming Airlines is 80 percent owned by Shenzhen Airlines with the remaining 20% owned by a local businessman, with a total registered capital of RMB 80 million. The new airline will receive two Boeing 737-700 and one Boeing 737-800 aircraft as well as 30 pilots and 26 flight attendants from Shenzhen Airlines.

The airline commenced operations on 15 February 2009 from Kunming to Changsha and Harbin.

== Destinations ==
As of April 2026, the airlines serves destinations in China and Thailand.

=== Codeshare agreements ===
Kunming Airlines have codeshare agreements with the following airlines:

- Air China
- Shenzhen Airlines

== Fleet ==
As of August 2025, Kunming Airlines operates an all-Boeing 737 fleet composed of the following aircraft:

Kunming Airlines fleet
Aircraft	In service	Orders	Passengers			Notes
Aircraft	In service	Orders	J	Y	Total	Notes
Boeing 737-700	9	—	–	140	140	
Boeing 737-800	21	—	8	159	167	
Boeing 737-800	21	—	8	160	168	
Boeing 737 MAX 8	2	8	8	160	168	
Total	32	8				

In 2014, Kunming Airlines agreed to purchase 10 Boeing 737 aircraft (4 Boeing 737NG and 6 Boeing 737 MAX) in an $897m deal.
