= Xizang Airlines =

Chinese airline

Xizang Airlines བོད་ལྗོངས་མཁའ་འགྲུལ། 西藏航空

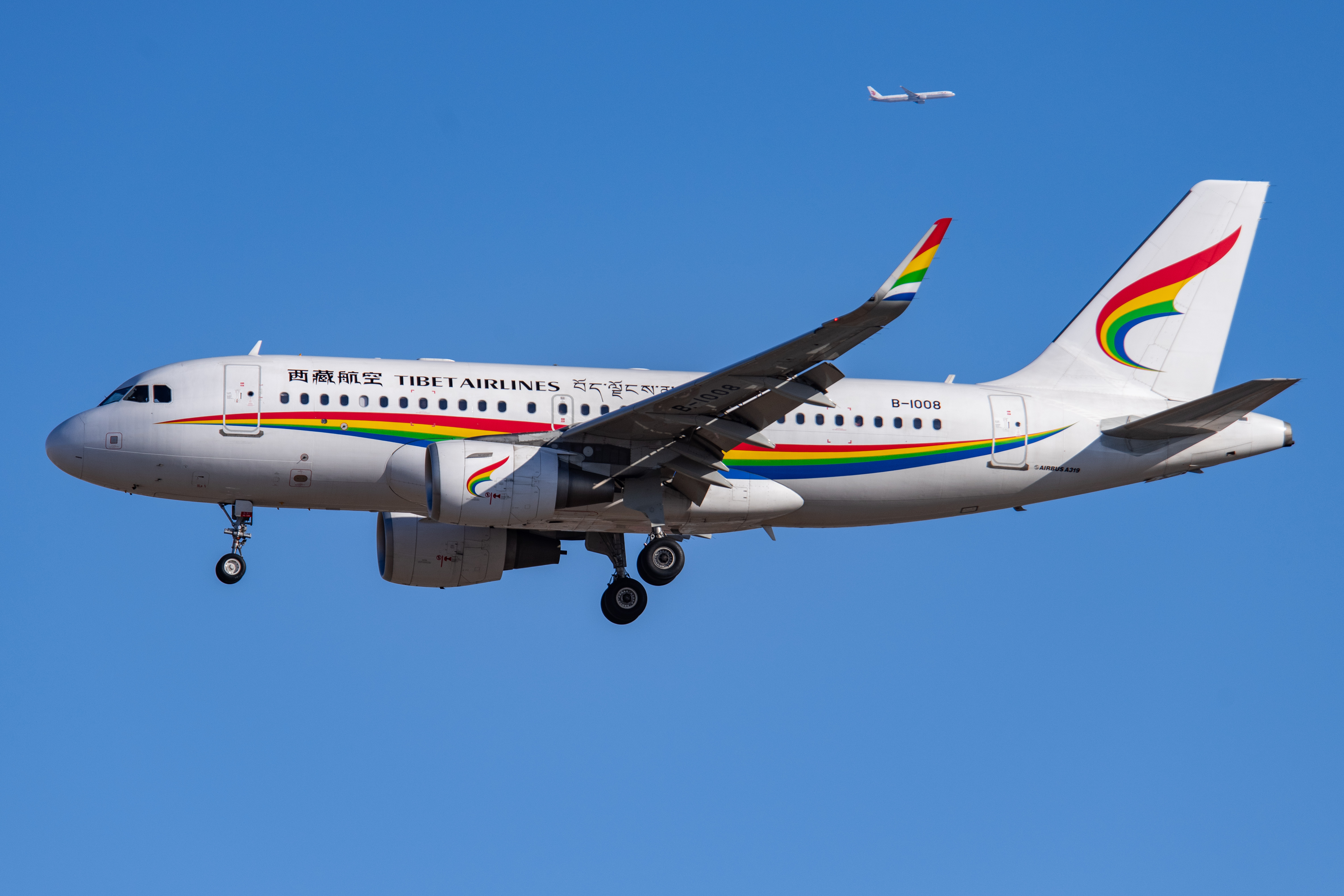
- A Xizang Airlines Airbus A319, under the old Tibet Airlines brand name
IATA	ICAO	Call sign
TV	TBA	TIBET
- Founded: 17 June 2010; 16 years ago; 16 February 2026; 9 months ago (Renamed Xizang Airlines)
- Commenced operations: 26 July 2011; 15 years ago
- Hubs: Chengdu–Shuangliu; Lhasa
- Fleet size: 53
- Destinations: 69
- Parent company: Air China (31%)
- Headquarters: Lhasa, Tibet Autonomous Region
- Key people: Liu Yanping, General Manager
- Website: www.airxizang.com/stdair/homepage

Xizang Airlines (Tibetan: བོད་ལྗོངས་མཁའ་འགྲུལ།, Wylie: bod ljongs mkha' 'grul; Chinese: 西藏航空; pinyin: Xīzàng Hángkōng, abbreviated Chinese: 藏航; pinyin: Zàngháng), previously Tibet Airlines, is an airline with its corporate headquarters and registered office in Lhasa, Tibet Autonomous Region, and operates scheduled domestic flights out of Lhasa Gonggar Airport and Chengdu Shuangliu International Airport.

== History ==
Tibet Airlines was approved by the Civil Aviation Administration of China in March 2010 and was established at Lhasa on 17 June 2010. It originally ordered three Airbus A319 airliners, receiving its first aircraft on 2 July 2011.

The airline commenced its inaugural route from Lhasa Gonggar Airport to Ngari Gunsa Airport on 26 July 2011 and began flights to Beijing and Shanghai later that year. The airline also announced plans to start direct flights to Europe by 2016. In February 2011, The Times of India reported that the airline was interested in starting operations in India and other countries in South and Southeast Asia.

The first international flight of Tibet Airlines was launched on 1 July 2016, connecting Chengdu Shuangliu International Airport and Samui Airport in Thailand. In September 2016, the airline confirmed that they had received permission to launch service to the Black Sea resort of Sochi from Sanya via Chengdu, starting in 2017.

On 8 January 2019, Finnish airport operator Finavia announced that Tibet Airlines will open a new route between Jinan, Shandong Province and Helsinki, Finland in April 2019. The route is to be operated twice weekly with Airbus A330 equipment.

On 16 February 2026, Tibet Airlines rebranded to Xizang Airlines.

== Corporate affairs ==
The airline has its head office and its registered office in the Lhasa Economic and Technological Development Zone (simplified Chinese: 拉萨市经济技术开发区; traditional Chinese: 拉薩市經濟技術開發區; pinyin: Lāsà Shì Jīngjì Jìshù Kāifāqū), in Lhasa, Tibet Autonomous Region. It also has an office in Chengdu.

== Destinations ==
As of April 2026, the airlines serves destinations in China, Hong Kong and Vietnam.

=== Codeshare agreements ===
Xizang Airlines has codeshare agreements with the following airlines:

- Air China
- Loong Air

== Fleet ==
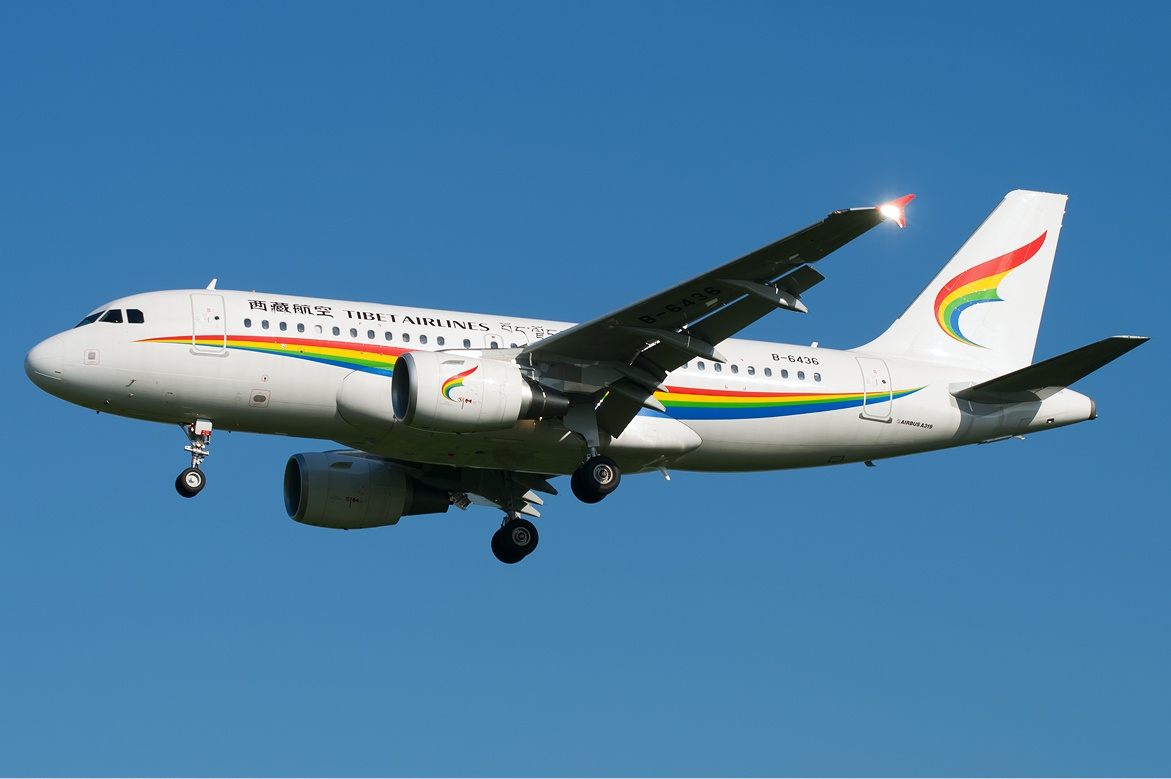
Tibet Airlines Airbus A319

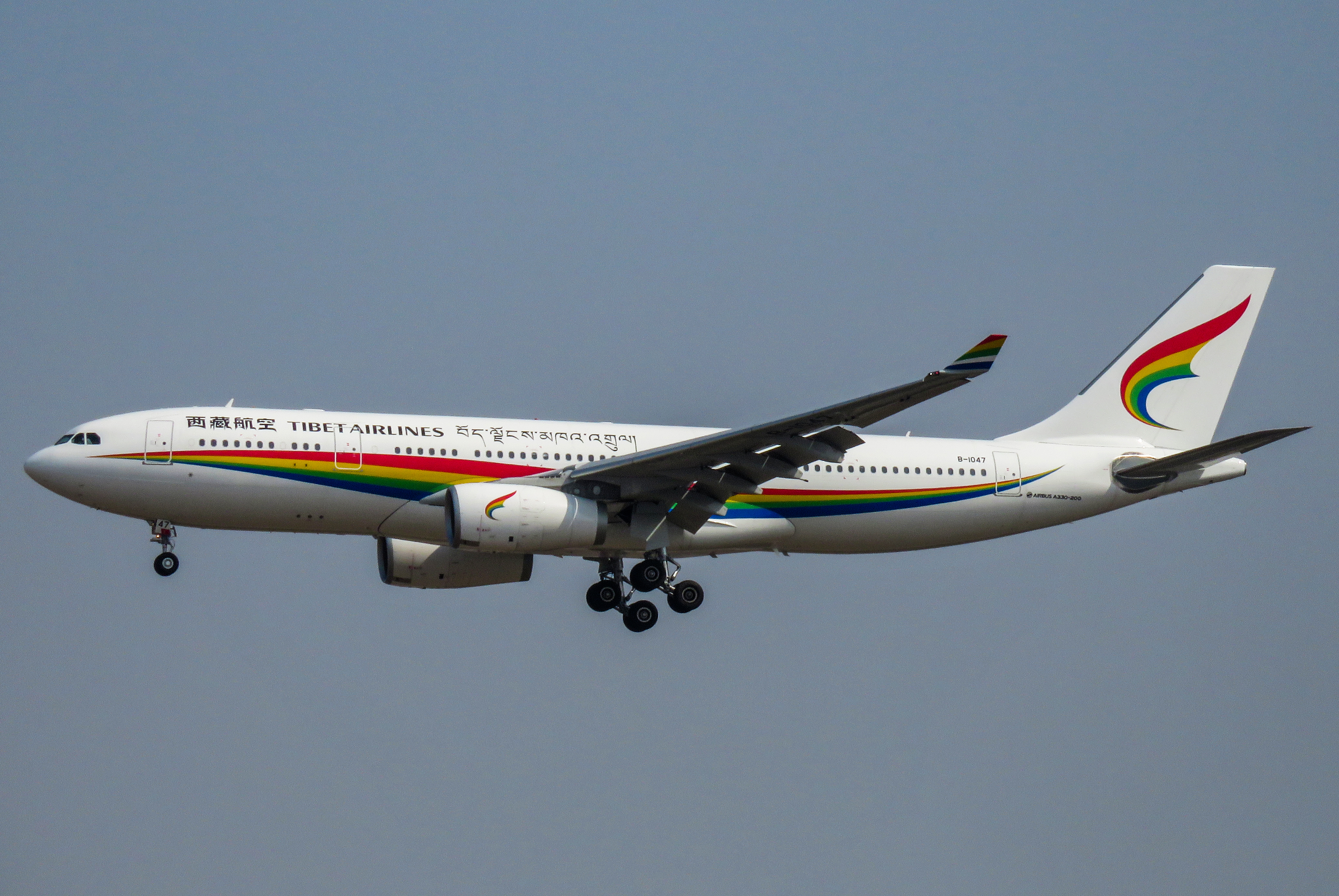
Tibet Airlines Airbus A330

=== Current fleet ===
As of July 2026, Xizang Airlines operates the following aircraft:

Xizang Airlines fleet
Aircraft	In service	Orders	Passengers				Notes
Aircraft	In service	Orders	J	W	Y	Total	Notes
Airbus A319	27	—	8	—	120	128	Includes the last A319ceo built (B-323J)
Airbus A319neo	15		8	—	126	134	
Airbus A320	6	—	8	—	150	158	
Airbus A330-200	5	—	12	32	235	279	
Comac C909	—	10	TBA				
Comac C919-600	—	40	TBA				
Total	53	50					

=== Former fleet ===
As of September 2025, Xizang Airlines operated 27 Airbus A319, 9 Airbus A319neo, 6 Airbus A320 and 5 Airbus A330-200

== Incidents and accidents ==
- On 12 May 2022, Tibet Airlines Flight 9833, an Airbus A319-100 (registered B-6425), veered off the runway on takeoff in Chongqing Jiangbei International Airport, causing a fire. All of the passengers and crew members on board survived, with only minor injuries sustained from the evacuation.
