= List of the busiest airports in China =

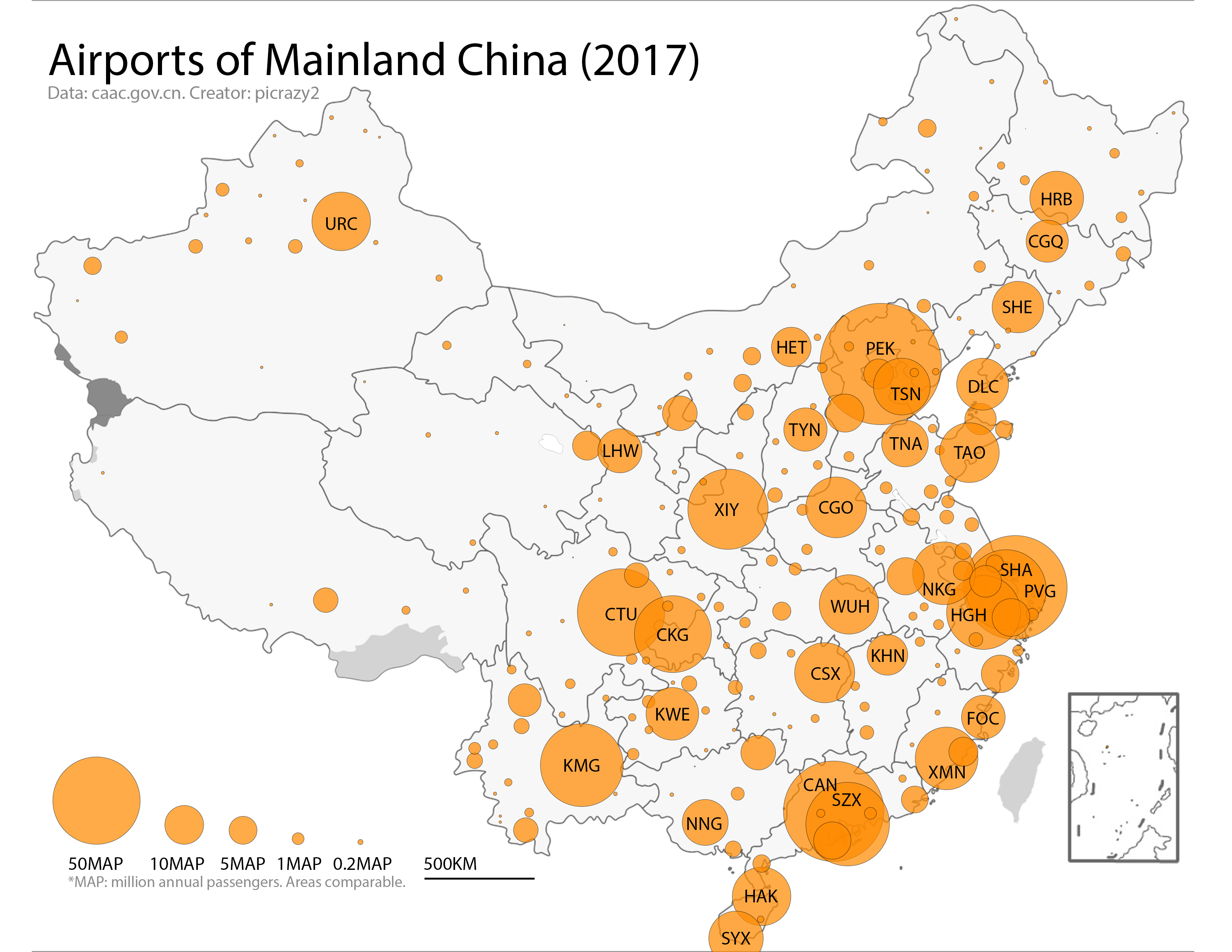
Map of all airports in mainland China with regular scheduled commercial flights, according to their 2017 total passenger throughput. Airports with >10 mil passengers labeled.

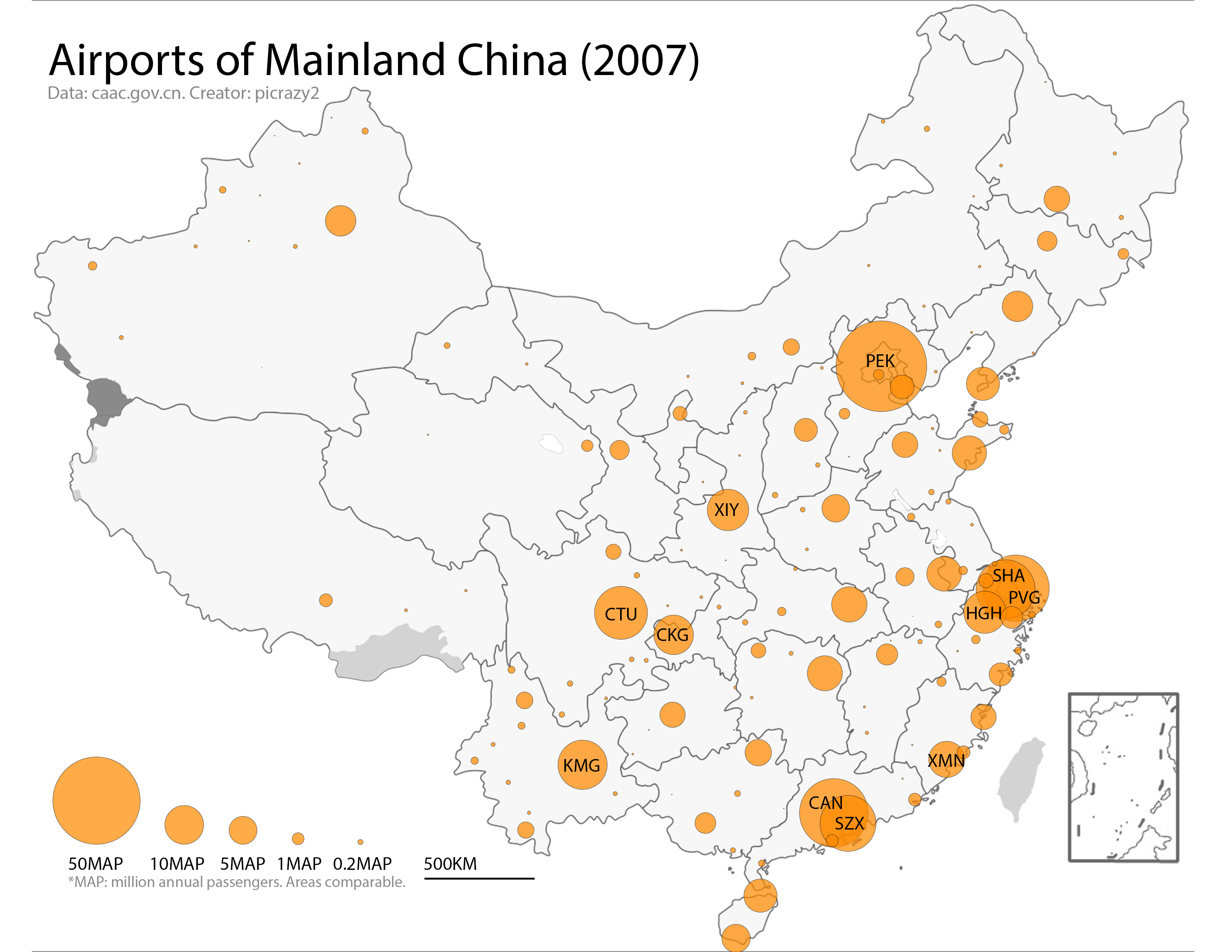
Busiest airports in mainland China in 2007, with airports with >10 mil passengers labeled.

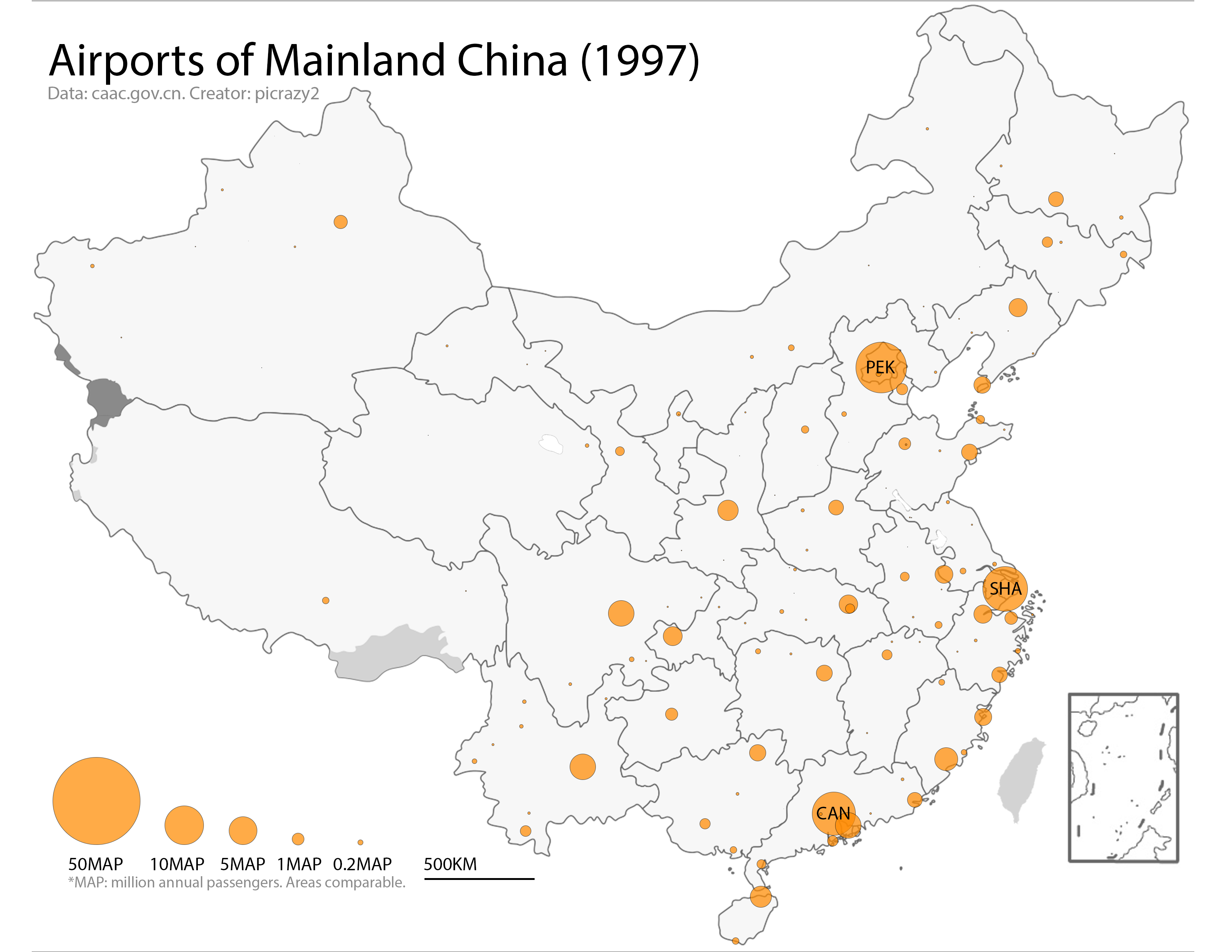
Busiest airports in mainland China in 1997, with airports with >10 mil passengers labeled.

China's busiest airports are a series of lists ranking the 100 busiest airports in Mainland China according to the number of total passengers, including statistics for total aircraft movements and total cargo movements, following the official register yearly since 2000. The data here presented are provided by the Civil Aviation Administration of China (CAAC) and these statistics do not include the results for the special administrative regions of Hong Kong and Macau, or the country of Taiwan (ROC). Both Hong Kong and Macau have their own civil aviation regulators (the Civil Aviation Department and the Civil Aviation Authority respectively); Taiwan also has its own civil aviation regulator (the Aviation Safety Council).

The lists are presented in chronological order starting from the latest year. The number of total passengers is measured in persons and includes any passenger that arrives or departs from, or transits through, every airport in the country. The number of total aircraft movements is measured in airplane-times and includes the departures and arrivals of any kind of aircraft in schedule or charter conditions. The number of total cargo movements in metric tonnes and includes all the movements of cargo and mail that arrives or departs from the airport.

== 2020s ==
=== 2025 final statistics ===
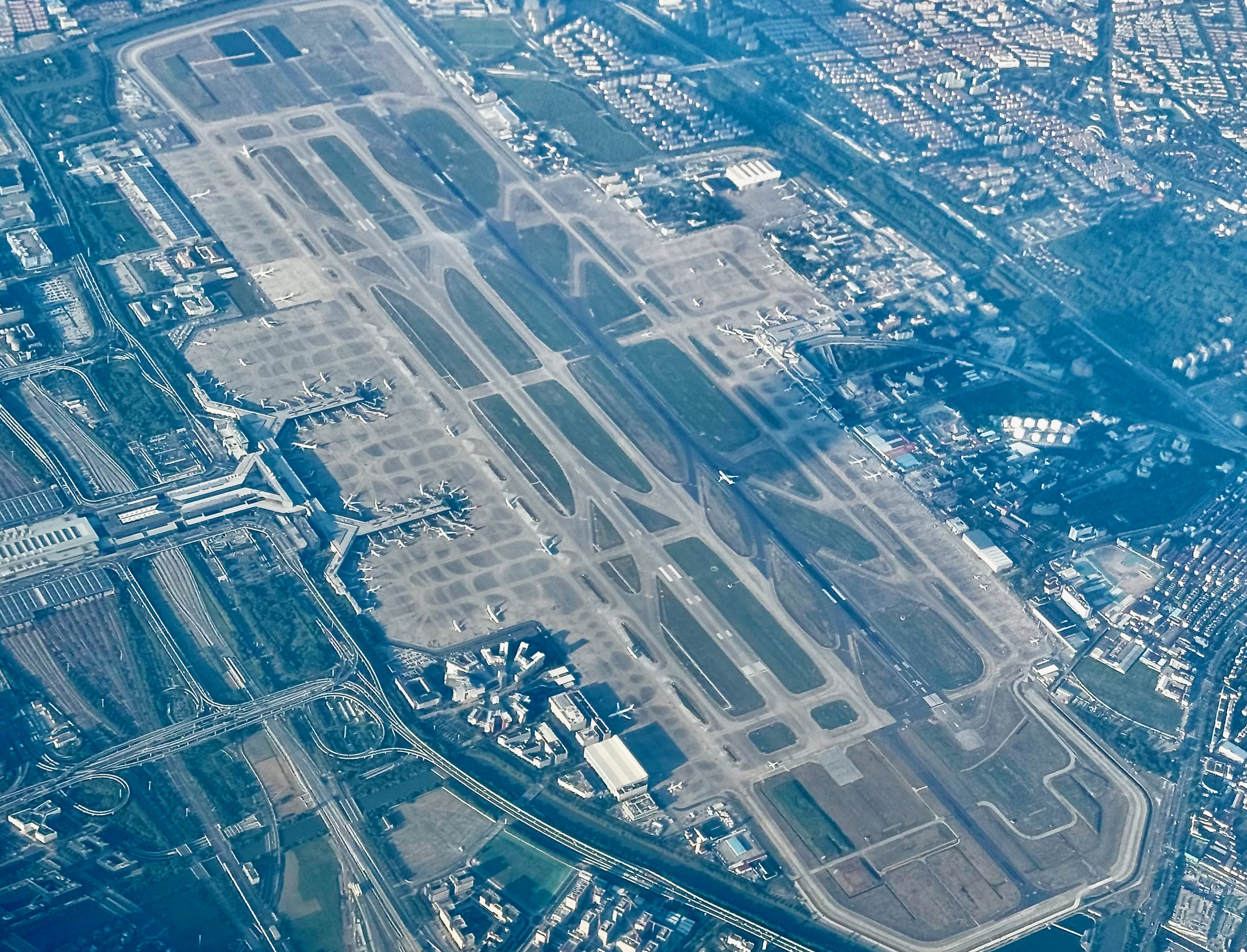
Shanghai Hongqiao International Airport is the first 4E class airport to surpass 50 million passengers.

The top 108 airports in China with over 1 million passengers in 2025, ordered by total passenger traffic, according to CAAC statistics.

Rank	Airport	City served	Province	IATA/ICAO	Passengers	Aircraft	Cargo
1.	Shanghai Pudong International Airport	Shanghai	Shanghai	PVG/ZSPD	84,994,548	557,043	4,091,940.9
2.	Guangzhou Baiyun International Airport	Guangzhou	Guangdong	CAN/ZGGG	83,582,952	550,512	2,439,247.5
3.	Beijing Capital International Airport	Beijing	Beijing	PEK/ZBAA	70,742,712	442,046	1,550,926.2
4.	Shenzhen Bao'an International Airport	Shenzhen	Guangdong	SZX/ZGSZ	66,485,213	448,019	2,050,835.8
5.	Chengdu Tianfu International Airport	Chengdu	Sichuan	TFU/ZUTF	56,686,738	383,547	434,634.7
6.	Beijing Daxing International Airport	Beijing	Beijing	PKX/ZBAD	53,618,949	345,791	369,159.7
7.	Hangzhou Xiaoshan International Airport	Hangzhou	Zhejiang	HGH/ZSHC	50,459,018	329,355	792,710.1
8.	Shanghai Hongqiao International Airport	Shanghai	Shanghai	SHA/ZSSS	50,151,025	282,692	445,265.5
9.	Chongqing Jiangbei International Airport	Chongqing	Chongqing	CKG/ZUCK	50,094,770	335,919	548,485.3
10.	Kunming Changshui International Airport	Kunming	Yunnan	KMG/ZPPP	49,705,725	340,867	413,244.8
11.	Xi'an Xianyang International Airport	Xi'an, Xianyang	Shaanxi	XIY/ZLXY	48,535,594	336,740	334,819.0
12.	Chengdu Shuangliu International Airport	Chengdu	Sichuan	CTU/ZUUU	33,518,945	222,551	735,575.7
13.	Nanjing Lukou International Airport	Nanjing	Jiangsu	NKG/ZSNJ	31,378,166	235,200	476,682.5
14.	Wuhan Tianhe International Airport	Wuhan	Hubei	WUH/ZHHH	31,339,277	219,454	179,668.7
15.	Changsha Huanghua International Airport	Changsha	Hunan	CSX/ZGHA	30,253,675	205,723	166,808.6
16.	Xiamen Gaoqi International Airport	Xiamen	Fujian	XMN/ZSAM	29,193,712	198,582	377,213.6
17.	Zhengzhou Xinzheng International Airport	Zhengzhou	Henan	CGO/ZHCC	29,191,990	222,362	1,033,397.3
18.	Ürümqi Tianshan International Airport	Ürümqi	Xinjiang	URC/ZWWW	29,179,737	194,910	331,789.7
19.	Qingdao Jiaodong International Airport	Qingdao	Shandong	TAO/ZSQD	26,896,534	192,823	227,086.0
20.	Haikou Meilan International Airport	Haikou	Hainan	HAK/ZJHK	26,851,102	185,220	215,752.3
21.	Shenyang Taoxian International Airport	Shenyang	Liaoning	SHE/ZYTX	24,938,062	164,261	210,954.4
22.	Harbin Taiping International Airport	Harbin	Heilongjiang	HRB/ZYHB	24,650,717	162,548	149,257.8
23.	Guiyang Longdongbao International Airport	Guiyang	Guizhou	KWE/ZUGY	22,731,681	158,872	119,268.0
24.	Sanya Phoenix International Airport	Sanya	Hainan	SYX/ZJSY	22,685,734	139,873	117,135.6
25.	Jinan Yaoqiang International Airport	Jinan	Shandong	TNA/ZSJN	20,329,972	145,034	173,706.3
26.	Tianjin Binhai International Airport	Tianjin	Tianjin	TSN/ZBTJ	19,862,196	146,768	133,023.3
27.	Dalian Zhoushuizi International Airport	Dalian	Liaoning	DLC/ZYTL	19,787,716	143,447	171,653.3
28.	Changchun Longjia International Airport	Changchun	Jilin	CGQ/ZYCC	17,759,299	118,125	106,502.2
29.	Lanzhou Zhongchuan International Airport	Lanzhou	Gansu	LHW/ZLLL	17,734,885	126,112	86,144.3
30.	Ningbo Lishe International Airport	Ningbo	Zhejiang	NGB/ZSNB	16,125,459	113,483	160,124.2
31.	Fuzhou Changle International Airport	Fuzhou	Fujian	FOC/ZSFZ	16,117,180	112,326	122,474.8
32.	Taiyuan Wusu International Airport	Taiyuan, Jinzhong	Shanxi	TYN/ZBYN	14,573,546	107,127	76,464.4
33.	Nanning Wuxu International Airport	Nanning	Guangxi	NNG/ZGNN	13,502,293	97,966	186,616.7
34.	Zhuhai Jinwan Airport	Zhuhai	Guangdong	ZUH/ZGSD	13,252,642	92,419	39,553.8
35.	Wenzhou Longwan International Airport	Wenzhou	Zhejiang	WNZ/ZSWZ	13,058,523	93,735	128,653.5
36.	Hohhot Baita International Airport	Hohhot	Inner Mongolia	HET/ZBHH	12,722,692	111,576	60,227.8
37.	Hefei Xinqiao International Airport	Hefei	Anhui	HFE/ZSOF	12,644,989	97,281	136,493.3
38.	Shijiazhuang Zhengding International Airport	Shijiazhuang	Hebei	SJW/ZBSJ	12,014,301	85,717	66,422.0
39.	Nanchang Changbei International Airport	Nanchang	Jiangxi	KHN/ZSCN	11,936,032	92,149	42,413.6
40.	Wuxi Shuofang Airport	Wuxi	Jiangsu	WUX/ZSWX	10,967,778	82,730	196,706.1
41.	Jieyang Chaoshan International Airport	Jieyang, Chaozhou, Shantou	Guangdong	SWA/ZGOW	10,228,556	81,390	38,678.7
42.	Yinchuan Hedong International Airport	Yinchuan	Ningxia	INC/ZLIC	9,860,514	75,327	49,713.7
43.	Quanzhou Jinjiang International Airport	Quanzhou	Fujian	JJN/ZSQZ	8,852,384	62,771	74,115.7
44	Lijiang Sanyi International Airport	Lijiang	Yunnan	LJG/ZPLJ	8,631,218	62,484	16,744.9
45	Yantai Penglai International Airport	Yantai	Shandong	YNT/ZSYT	8,036,554	68,553	72,622.4
46	Xining Caojiapu International Airport	Xining	Qinghai	XNN/ZLXN	7,877,903	63,344	40,127.8
47	Xishuangbanna Gasa International Airport	Jinghong	Yunnan	JHG/ZPJH	7,711,821	54,864	26,019.4
48	Guilin Liangjiang International Airport	Guilin	Guangxi	KWL/ZGKL	6,504,366	47,573	14,376.9
49	Lhasa Gonggar International Airport	Lhasa	Tibet	LXA/ZULS	6,284,823	52,073	49,562.9
50	Kashgar Laining International Airport	Kashgar	Xinjiang	KHG/ZWSH	5,233,499	41,956	25,121.6
51	Changzhou Benniu International Airport	Changzhou	Jiangsu	CZX/ZSCG	5,139,214	49,410	23,208.1
52	Yangzhou Taizhou International Airport	Yangzhou	Jiangsu	YTY/ZSYA	4,163,596	47,471	14,994.1
53	Nantong Xingdong International Airport	Nantong	Jiangsu	NTG/ZSNT	4,161,852	38,305	70,629.9
54	Xuzhou Guanyin International Airport	Xuzhou	Jiangsu	XUZ/ZSXZ	4,082,736	34,830	18,313.2
55	Dali Fengyi Airport	Dali	Yunnan	DLU/ZPDL	3,750,473	32,227	11,798.0
56	Yiwu Airport	Yiwu	Zhejiang	YIW/ZSYW	3,684,507	28,234	24,386.9
57	Ili Yining International Airport	Yining	Xinjiang	YIN/ZWYN	3,454,959	33,129	9,604.8
58	Yichang Sanxia International Airport	Yichang	Hubei	YIH/ZHYC	3,406,149	76,344	13,324.6
59	Huizhou Pingtan Airport	Huizhou	Guangdong	HUZ/ZGHZ	3,365,186	25,638	11,661.4
60	Mianyang Nanjiao Airport	Mianyang	Sichuan	MIG/ZUMY	3,286,383	191,020	7,492.8
61	Hulunbuir Hailar International Airport	Hailar	Inner Mongolia	HLD/ZBLA	3,239,067	26,552	6,233.3
62	Ordos Ejin Horo International Airport	Ordos	Inner Mongolia	DSN/ZBDS	3,201,398	38,370	13,367.8
63	Zhanjiang Wuchuan International Airport	Zhanjiang	Guangdong	ZHA/ZGZJ	3,122,262	29,068	11,617.5
64	Yulin Yuyang Airport	Yulin	Shaanxi	UYN/ZLYL	3,106,499	29,836	16,786.2
65	Dehong Mangshi International Airport	Mangshi	Yunnan	LUM/ZPMS	3,075,024	24,432	16,281.4
66	Korla Licheng Airport	Korla	Xinjiang	KRL/ZWKL	2,959,190	27,439	9,275.7
67	Beihai Fucheng Airport	Beihai	Guangxi	BHY/ZGBH	2,955,931	20,536	5,038.3
68	Weihai Dashuipo International Airport	Weihai	Shandong	WEH/ZSWH	2,908,096	23,705	28,772.5
69	Zhoushan Putuoshan International Airport	Zhoushan	Zhejiang	HSN/ZSZS	2,888,463	30,468	4,908.2
70	Yuncheng Yanhu International Airport	Yuncheng	Shanxi	YCU/ZBYC	2,873,454	25,867	8,558.9
71	Aksu Hongqipo Airport	Aksu	Xinjiang	AKU/ZWAK	2,778,946	25,462	11,306.3
72	Linyi Qiyang International Airport	Linyi	Shandong	LYI/ZSLY	2,467,279	27,178	8,144.7
73	Taizhou Luqiao Airport	Taizhou	Zhejiang	HYN/ZSLQ	2,447,367	19,433	13,211.7
74	Luzhou Yunlong Airport	Luzhou	Sichuan	LZO/ZULZ	2,382,039	21,379	7,007.4
75	Ganzhou Huangjin Airport	Ganzhou	Jiangxi	KOW/ZSGZ	2,235,615	18,676	7,527.1
76	Yibin Wuliangye Airport	Yibin	Sichuan	YBP/ZUYB	2,091,670	18,184	7,611.3
77	Zhangjiajie Hehua International Airport	Zhangjiajie	Hunan	DYG/ZGDY	2,062,663	15,578	176.5
78	Yancheng Nanyang International Airport	Yancheng	Jiangsu	YNZ/ZSYN	2,034,871	17,711	7,731.5
79	Huai'an Lianshui International Airport	Huai'an	Jiangsu	HIA/ZSSH	2,007,564	41,056	9,628.1
80	Baotou Donghe International Airport	Baotou	Inner Mongolia	BAV/ZBOW	1,965,255	17,521	3,624.0
81	Enshi Xujiaping International Airport	Enshi	Hubei	ENH/ZHES	1,947,626	16,650	2,492.0
82	Hotan Kungang Airport	Hotan	Xinjiang	HTN/ZWTN	1,939,110	16,897	9,732.2
83	Chifeng Yulong Airport	Chifeng	Inner Mongolia	CIF/ZBCF	1,900,454	20,369	2,029.9
84	Xiangyang Liuji Airport	Xiangyang	Hubei	XFN/ZHXF	1,899,754	67,795	3,405.0
85	Lianyungang Huaguoshan International Airport	Lianyungang	Jiangsu	LYG/ZSLG	1,746,839	16,764	3,086.4
86	Shiyan Wudangshan Airport	Shiyan	Hubei	WDS/ZHSY	1,533,810	15,704	3,158.6
87	Jining Da'an Airport	Jining	Shandong	JNG/ZSJG	1,503,617	12,738	2,602.0
88	Xingyi Wanfenglin Airport	Xingyi	Guizhou	ACX/ZUYI	1,466,421	17,598	2,501.7
89	Foshan Shadi Airport	Foshan	Guangdong	FUO/ZGFS	1,460,420	9,554	N/A
90	Zunyi Xinzhou Airport	Zunyi	Guizhou	ZYI/ZUZY	1,388,520	11,840	1,118.0
91	Yanji Chaoyangchuan International Airport	Yanji	Jilin	YNJ/ZYYJ	1,383,620	10,369	2,783.5
92	Tongliao Airport	Tongliao	Inner Mongolia	TGO/ZBTL	1,356,501	16,641	1,940.5
93	Dongying Shengli Airport	Dongying	Shandong	DOY/ZSDY	1,300,766	41,675	1,315.8
94	Dunhuang Mogao International Airport	Dunhuang	Gansu	DNH/ZLDH	1,285,341	12,536	1,861.1
95	Jiayuguan Jiuquan Airport	Jiayuguan	Gansu	JGN/ZLJQ	1,280,756	11,638	3,085.6
96	Jingzhou Shashi Airport	Jingzhou	Hubei	SHS/ZHJZ	1,250,867	12,866	961.4
97	Zunyi Maotai Airport	Renhuai	Guizhou	WMT/ZUMT	1,221,929	13,030	2,354.0
98	Liuzhou Bailian Airport	Liuzhou	Guangxi	LZH/ZGZH	1,210,438	9,420	4,762.2
99	Xilinhot Airport	Xilinhot	Inner Mongolia	XIL/ZBXH	1,185,919	17,601	884.0
100	Altay Xuedu Airport	Altay	Xinjiang	AAT/ZWAT	1,174,857	13,239	440.5
101.	Hengyang Nanyue Airport	Hengyang	Hunan	HNY/ZGHY	1,145,286	10,902	260.7
102.	Dazhou Jinya Airport	Dazhou	Sichuan	DZH/ZUDA	1,143,396	15,443	927.2
103.	Quzhou Airport	Quzhou	Zhejiang	JUZ/ZSJU	1,111,124	10,853	725.3
104.	Ulanhot Yilelite Airport	Ulanhot	Inner Mongolia	HLH/ZBUL	1,107,433	41,691	845.8
105.	Hami Yizhou Airport	Hami	Xinjiang	HMI/ZWHM	1,085,699	12,168	946.7
106.	Nanchong Gaoping Airport	Nanchong	Sichuan	NAO/ZUNC	1,073,038	16,002	2480.3
107.	Nanyang Jiangying Airport	Nanyang	Henan	NNY/ZHNY	1,036,774	62,924	758.6
108.	Fuyang Airport	Fuyang	Anhui	FUG/ZSFY	1,021,834	16,473	1213.5

=== 2024 final statistics ===
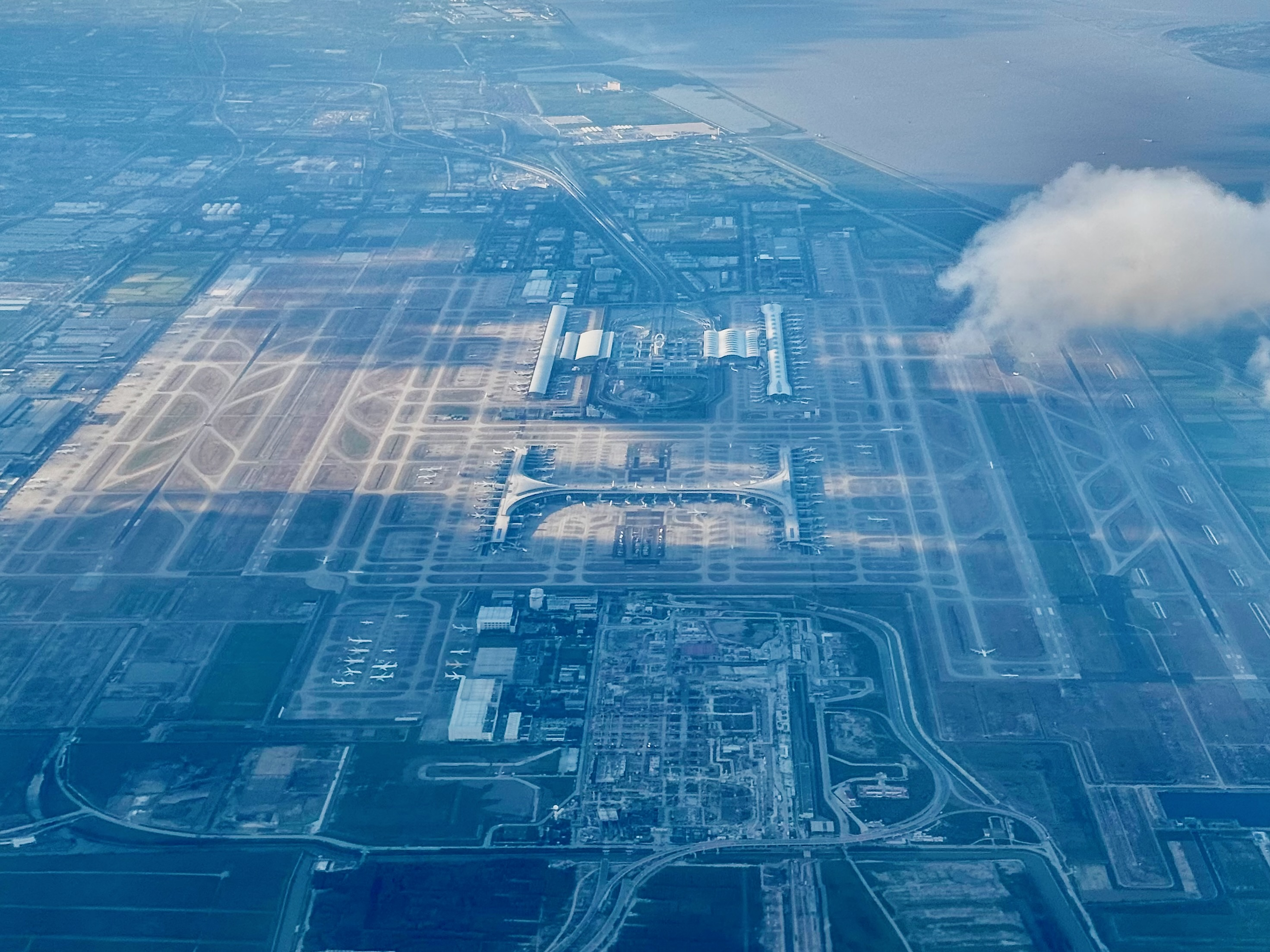
In 2024 Shanghai Pudong International Airport became the busiest airport in China for the first time since its operations commenced in 1999.

The 100 busiest airports in China in 2024 ordered by total passenger traffic, according to CAAC statistics.

Rank	Airport	City served	Province	IATA/ICAO	Passengers	Aircraft	Cargo
1.	Shanghai Pudong International Airport	Shanghai	Shanghai	PVG/ZSPD	76,787,039	528,074	3,778,331.0
2.	Guangzhou Baiyun International Airport	Guangzhou	Guangdong	CAN/ZGGG	76,364,767	511,972	2,381,901.1
3.	Beijing Capital International Airport	Beijing	Beijing	PEK/ZBAA	67,367,428	433,572	1,443,285.6
4.	Shenzhen Bao'an International Airport	Shenzhen	Guangdong	SZX/ZGSZ	61,477,337	428,231	1,881,468.4
5.	Chengdu Tianfu International Airport	Chengdu	Sichuan	TFU/ZUTF	54,905,784	378,798	384,923.1
6.	Beijing Daxing International Airport	Beijing	Beijing	PKX/ZBAD	49,441,029	325,246	326,240.1
7.	Chongqing Jiangbei International Airport	Chongqing	Chongqing	CKG/ZUCK	48,676,973	330,380	469,526.3
8.	Hangzhou Xiaoshan International Airport	Hangzhou	Zhejiang	HGH/ZSHC	48,053,915	320,269	734,859.0
9.	Shanghai Hongqiao International Airport	Shanghai	Shanghai	SHA/ZSSS	47,944,067	275,288	427,652.3
10.	Kunming Changshui International Airport	Kunming	Yunnan	KMG/ZPPP	47,178,347	329,602	385,625.0
11.	Xi'an Xianyang International Airport	Xi'an, Xianyang	Shaanxi	XIY/ZLXY	47,030,407	332,558	290,526.9
12.	Chengdu Shuangliu International Airport	Chengdu	Sichuan	CTU/ZUUU	32,430,354	212,532	642,617.6
13.	Wuhan Tianhe International Airport	Wuhan	Hubei	WUH/ZHHH	31,406,186	221,374	173,116.7
14.	Changsha Huanghua International Airport	Changsha	Hunan	CSX/ZGHA	31,218,109	217,367	199,755.5
15.	Nanjing Lukou International Airport	Nanjing	Jiangsu	NKG/ZSNJ	31,179,654	237,784	414,640.5
16.	Zhengzhou Xinzheng International Airport	Zhengzhou	Henan	CGO/ZHCC	28,510,891	218,287	825,128.7
17.	Xiamen Gaoqi International Airport	Xiamen	Fujian	XMN/ZSAM	27,906,964	193,268	375,652.9
18.	Ürümqi Tianshan International Airport	Ürümqi	Xinjiang	URC/ZWWW	27,765,723	188,743	235,903.8
19.	Haikou Meilan International Airport	Haikou	Hainan	HAK/ZJHK	26,890,365	186,117	209,336.0
20.	Qingdao Jiaodong International Airport	Qingdao	Shandong	TAO/ZSQD	26,180,661	186,117	279,420.3
21.	Harbin Taiping International Airport	Harbin	Heilongjiang	HRB/ZYHB	23,797,643	160,038	140,691.5
22.	Shenyang Taoxian International Airport	Shenyang	Liaoning	SHE/ZYTX	23,744,323	161,129	227,977.0
23.	Guiyang Longdongbao International Airport	Guiyang	Guizhou	KWE/ZUGY	22,313,353	157,614	106,608.3
24.	Sanya Phoenix International Airport	Sanya	Hainan	SYX/ZJSY	21,425,941	131,240	101,487.3
25.	Tianjin Binhai International Airport	Tianjin	Tianjin	TSN/ZBTJ	20,063,745	148,889	137,322.2
26.	Jinan Yaoqiang International Airport	Jinan	Shandong	TNA/ZSJN	20,012,106	145,529	153,635.6
27.	Dalian Zhoushuizi International Airport	Dalian	Liaoning	DLC/ZYTL	19,288,910	144,447	150,113.0
28.	Changchun Longjia International Airport	Changchun	Jilin	CGQ/ZYCC	17,607,456	120,646	98,637.9
29.	Lanzhou Zhongchuan International Airport	Lanzhou	Gansu	LHW/ZLLL	17,000,963	123,796	86,028.8
30.	Fuzhou Changle International Airport	Fuzhou	Fujian	FOC/ZSFZ	15,299,802	108,080	92,593.5
31.	Taiyuan Wusu International Airport	Taiyuan, Jinzhong	Shanxi	TYN/ZBYN	14,775,147	111,270	61,955.8
32.	Ningbo Lishe International Airport	Ningbo	Zhejiang	NGB/ZSNB	14,733,364	108,650	168,567.3
33.	Nanning Wuxu International Airport	Nanning	Guangxi	NNG/ ZGNN	14,005,332	105,939	189,432.4
34.	Hohhot Baita International Airport	Hohhot	Inner Mongolia	HET/ZBHH	13,166,230	117,907	59,180.6
35.	Zhuhai Jinwan Airport	Zhuhai	Guangdong	ZUH/ZGSD	12,970,873	93,331	34,252.2
36.	Wenzhou Longwan International Airport	Wenzhou	Zhejiang	WNZ/ZSWZ	12,532,569	92,725	129,300.3
37.	Hefei Xinqiao International Airport	Hefei	Anhui	HFE/ZSOF	12,481,354	98,636	120,121.8
38.	Shijiazhuang Zhengding International Airport	Shijiazhuang	Hebei	SJW/ZBSJ	11,314,852	83,360	68,751.4
39.	Nanchang Changbei International Airport	Nanchang	Jiangxi	KHN/ZSCN	11,267,923	88,540	66,298.2
40.	Wuxi Shuofang International Airport	Wuxi	Jiangsu	WUX/ZSWX	10,504,277	81,445	173,497.4
41.	Yinchuan Hedong International Airport	Yinchuan	Ningxia	INC/ZLIC	8,982,751	70,282	45,941.4
42.	Quanzhou Jinjiang International Airport	Quanzhou	Fujian	JJN/ZSQZ	8,842,486	64,335	77,150.8
43.	Jieyang Chaoshan Airport	Jieyang, Chaozhou, Shantou	Guangdong	SWA/ZGOW	8,665,819	70,498	32,991.1
44.	Yantai Penglai International Airport	Yantai	Shandong	YNT/ZSYT	8,633,572	76,138	78,105.1
45.	Lijiang Sanyi Airport	Lijiang	Yunnan	LJG/ZPLJ	8,092,935	61,016	15,769.5
46.	Xishuangbanna Gasa Airport	Jinghong	Yunnan	JHG/ZPJH	7,163,490	52,287	22,615.4
47.	Xining Caojiabao Airport	Xining, Haidong	Qinghai	XNN/ZLXN	7,026,023	52,287	22,615.4
48.	Lhasa Gonggar Airport	Lhasa, Shannan	Tibet	LXA/ZULS	6,018,814	56,596	37,288.0
49.	Guilin Liangjiang International Airport	Guilin	Guangxi	KWL/ZGKL	5,932,075	45,240	19,054.2
50.	Changzhou Benniu Airport	Changzhou	Jiangsu	CZX/ZSCG	4,562,418	46,379	20762.4
51.	Kashgar Airport	Kashgar	Xinjiang	KHG/ZWSH	4,497,137	36,850	21,820.6
52.	Nantong Xingdong Airport	Nantong	Jiangsu	NTG/ZSNT	4,102,477	39,634	68,731.2
53.	Yangzhou Taizhou Airport	Yangzhou, Taizhou	Jiangsu	YTY/ZSYA	3,648,564	47,083	12,619.2
54.	Xuzhou Guanyin Airport	Xuzhou	Jiangsu	XUZ/ZSXZ	3,428,248	29,408	15,061.1
55.	Yiwu Airport	Yiwu	Zhejiang	YIW/ZSYW	3,402,188	26,706	22,694.5
56.	Dali Fengyi Airport	Dali	Yunnan	DLU/ZPDL	3,248,424	29,289	10,139.3
57.	Hulunbuir Hailar Airport	Hailar	Inner Mongolia	HLD/ZBLA	3,227,793	27,027	6,208.9
58.	Zhanjiang Wuchuan Airport	Zhanjiang	Guangdong	ZHA/ZGZJ	3,218,648	29,086	9,300.3
59.	Yichang Sanxia Airport	Yichang	Hubei	YIH/ZHYC	3,072,981	75,423	16,921.2
60.	Ordos Ejin Horo Airport	Ordos	Inner Mongolia	DSN/ZBDS	3,033,405	38,816	13,189.9
61.	Mianyang Nanjiao Airport	Mianyang	Sichuan	MIG/ZUMY	3,020,074	197,320	6,979.2
62.	Huizhou Pingtan Airport	Huizhou	Guangdong	HUZ/ZGHZ	2,875,813	21,702	9,354.7
63.	Korla Airport	Korla	Xinjiang	KRL/ZWKL	2,834,317	27,112	9,316.8
64.	Weihai Dashuibo Airport	Weihai	Shandong	WEH/ZSWH	2,708,807	24,639	23,798.2
65.	Dehong Mangshi Airport	Mangshi	Yunnan	LUM/ZPLX	2,653,668	21,843	13,362.2
66.	Zhoushan Putuoshan Airport	Zhoushan	Zhejiang	HSN/ZSZS	2,633,186	31,283	4,515.5
67.	Yulin Yuyang Airport	Yulin	Shaanxi	UYN/ZLYL	2,590,139	24,801	13,615.8
68.	Yuncheng Zhangxiao Airport	Yuncheng	Shanxi	YCU/ZBYC	2,545,241	22,918	8,005.1
69.	Beihai Fucheng Airport	Beihai	Guangxi	BHY/ZGBH	2,517,871	18,290	6,711.4
70.	Yining International Airport	Yining	Xinjiang	YIN/ZWYN	2,510,780	24,918	8,408.4
71.	Aksu Onsu Airport	Aksu	Xinjiang	AKU/ZWAK	2,506,854	23,629	10,254.6
72.	Linyi Qiyang Airport	Linyi	Shandong	LYI/ZSLY	2,468,403	31,080	14,116.6
73.	Luzhou Yunlong Airport	Luzhou	Sichuan	LZO/ZULZ	2,435,108	25,921	5,171.8
74.	Baotou Donghe Airport	Baotou	Inner Mongolia	BAV/ZBOW	2,164,827	20,638	4,005.2
75.	Taizhou Luqiao Airport	Taizhou	Zhejiang	HYN/ZSLQ	2,142,200	17,581	12,007.7
76.	Yibin Wuliangye Airport	Yibin	Sichuan	YBP/ZUYB	2,092,465	18,408	8,083.1
77.	Chifeng Yulong Airport	Chifeng	Inner Mongolia	CIF/ZBCF	2,049,547	22,888	1,855.8
78.	Zhangjiajie Hehua International Airport	Huhua	Hunan	DYG/ZGDY	1,964,015	15,330	78.0
79.	Ganzhou Huangjin Airport	Ganzhou	Jiangxi	KOW/ZSGZ	1,938,089	16,072	5,816.6
80.	Huai'an Lianshui International Airport	Huai'an	Jiangsu	HIA/ZSSH	1,833,050	37,484	5,705.0
81.	Yanji Chaoyangchuan International Airport	Yanji	Guizhou	YNJ/ZYYJ	1,795,943	13,648	3,455.0
82.	Enshi Xujiaping Airport	Enshi	Hubei	ENH/ZHES	1,787,408	15,752	1,994.1
83.	Yancheng Nanyang Airport	Yancheng	Jiangsu	YNZ/ZSYN	1,766,350	15,094	5,373.0
84.	Xiangyang Liuji Airport	Xiangyang	Hubei	XFN/ZHXF	1,764,575	51,410	4,435.7
85.	Hotan Airport	Hotan	Xinjiang	HTN/ZWTN	1,576,227	13,582	8,718.1
86.	Lianyungang Huaguoshan International Airport	Lianyungang	Jiangsu	LYG/ZSLG	1,561,569	14,712	3,090.5
87.	Zunyi Maotai Airport	Renhuai	Guizhou	WMT/ZUMT	1,553,868	16,178	1,650.0
88.	Tongliao Airport	Tongliao	Inner Mongolia	TGO/ZBTL	1,446,962	18,125	1,759.0
89.	Jining Da'an Airport	Jining	Shandong	JNG/ZSJG	1,407,536	11,757	2,588.1
90.	Dazhou Jinya Airport	Dazhou	Sichuan	DZH/ZUDA	1,364,864	17,620	1,520.7
91.	Xingyi Wanfenglin Airport	Xingyi	Guizhou	ACX/ZUYI	1,359,410	15,462	1,538.0
92.	Foshan Shadi Airport	Foshan	Guangdong	FUO/ZGFS	1,329,381	9,420	N/A
93.	Zunyi Xinzhou Airport	Zunyi	Guizhou	ZYI/ZUZY	1,313,034	11,614	1,001.2
94.	Fuyang Airport	Fuyang	Anhui	FUG/ZSFY	1,271,090	19,168	3,164.7
95.	Liuzhou Bailian Airport	Liuzhou	Guangxi	LZH/ZGZH	1,230,842	9,700	5,686.7
96.	Luoyang Beijiao Airport	Luoyang	Henan	LYA/ZHLY	1,192,259	207,723	825.9
97.	Datong Yungang International Airport	Datong	Shanxi	DAT/ZBDT	1,169,474	18,825	1,948.6
98.	Dunhuang Mogao International Airport	Dunhuang	Gansu	DNH/ZLDH	1,169,408	11,188	1,704.0
99.	Dongying Shengli Airport	Dongying	Shandong	DOY/ZSDY	1,163,287	50,367	1,107.0
100.	Xilinhot Airport	Xilinhot	Inner Mongolia	XIL/ZBXH	1,120,787	17,152	932.5

=== 2023 final statistics ===
The 100 busiest airports in China in 2023 ordered by total passenger traffic, according to CAAC statistics.

Rank	Airport	City served	Province	IATA/ICAO	Passengers	Aircraft	Cargo
1	Guangzhou Baiyun International Airport	Guangzhou	Guangdong	CAN/ZGGG	63,167,751	456,104	2,030,522.712
2	Shanghai Pudong International Airport	Shanghai	Shanghai	PVG/ZSPD	54,476,397	433,867	3,440,084.325
3	Beijing Capital International Airport	Beijing	Beijing	PEK/ZBAA	52,879,156	379,710	1,115,907.905
4	Shenzhen Bao'an International Airport	Shenzhen	Guangdong	SZX/ZGSZ	52,734,934	393,073	1,600,347.678
5	Chengdu Tianfu International Airport	Chengdu	Sichuan	TFU/ZUTF	44,786,101	329,559	245,896.668
6	Chongqing Jiangbei International Airport	Chongqing	Chongqing	CKG/ZUCK	44,657,227	314,697	387,892.873
7	Shanghai Hongqiao International Airport	Shanghai	Shanghai	SHA/ZSSS	42,492,745	266,813	363,218.687
8	Kunming Changshui International Airport	Kunming	Yunnan	KMG/ZPPP	42,033,527	318,586	350,468.966
9	Xi'an Xianyang International Airport	Xi'an / Xianyang	Shaanxi	XIY/ZLXY	41,371,228	310,547	265,793.047
10	Hangzhou Xiaoshan International Airport	Hangzhou	Zhejiang	HGH/ZSHC	41,170,470	300,361	809,668.445
11	Beijing Daxing International Airport	Beijing	Beijing	PKX/ZBAD	39,410,776	293,143	244,080.453
12	Chengdu Shuangliu International Airport	Chengdu	Sichuan	CTU/ZUUU	30,138,101	208,710	526,548.852
13	Nanjing Lukou International Airport	Nanjing	Jiangsu	NKG/ZSNJ	27,340,469	222,487	383,521.116
14	Changsha Huanghua International Airport	Changsha	Hunan	CSX/ZGHA	27,248,260	201,880	176,818.062
15	Wuhan Tianhe International Airport	Wuhan	Hubei	WUH/ZHHH	25,861,764	206,440	206,446.037
16	Zhengzhou Xinzheng International Airport	Zhengzhou	Henan	CGO/ZHCC	25,357,505	200,933	607,805.996
17	Ürümqi Diwopu International Airport	Ürümqi	Xinjiang	URC/ZWWW	25,088,961	176,801	155,132.993
18	Haikou Meilan International Airport	Haikou	Hainan	HAK/ZJHK	24,340,405	172,454	174,904.797
19	Xiamen Gaoqi International Airport	Xiamen	Fujian	XMN/ZSAM	24,104,090	179,518	314,405.056
20	Sanya Phoenix International Airport	Sanya	Hainan	SYX/ZJSY	21,775,758	136,351	94,725.819
21	Qingdao Jiaodong International Airport	Qingdao	Shandong	TAO/ZSQD	21,420,712	170,815	260,814.704
22	Harbin Taiping International Airport	Harbin	Heilongjiang	HRB/ZYHB	20,805,167	147,907	131,222.238
23	Shenyang Taoxian International Airport	Shenyang	Liaoning	SHE/ZYTX	20,564,385	152,522	198,461.912
24	Guiyang Longdongbao International Airport	Guiyang	Guizhou	KWE/ZUGY	19,470,638	144,024	91,355.849
25	Tianjin Binhai International Airport	Tianjin	Tianjin	TSN/ZBTJ	18,472,530	143,851	126,775.206
26	Jinan Yaoqiang International Airport	Jinan	Shandong	TNA/ZSJN	17,561,028	136,731	144,013.558
27	Dalian Zhoushuizi International Airport	Dalian	Liaoning	DLC/ZYTL	16,133,238	130,692	150,112.981
28	Lanzhou Zhongchuan International Airport	Lanzhou	Gansu	LHW/ZLLL	15,637,379	120,711	75,240.222
29	Changchun Longjia International Airport	Changchun	Jilin	CGQ/ZYCC	15,483,709	114,212	92,333.383
30	Nanning Wuxu International Airport	Nanning	Guangxi	NNG/ZGNN	13,689,746	110,168	189,432.445
31	Fuzhou Changle International Airport	Fuzhou	Fujian	FOC/ZSFZ	13,204,723	100,102	92,593.498
32	Ningbo Lishe International Airport	Ningbo	Zhejiang	NGB/ZSNB	12,901,552	99,330	142,757.864
33	Taiyuan Wusu International Airport	Taiyuan / Jinzhong	Shanxi	TYN/ZBYN	12,796,462	102,372	50,594.770
34	Wenzhou Longwan International Airport	Wenzhou	Zhejiang	WNZ/ZSWZ	11,688,220	93,364	106,058.359
35	Zhuhai Jinwan Airport	Zhuhai	Guangdong	ZUH/ZGSD	11,457,255	87,421	35,114.002
36	Hohhot Baita International Airport	Hohhot	Inner Mongolia	HET/ZBHH	11,304,646	105,280	47,833.662
37	Hefei Xinqiao International Airport	Hefei	Anhui	HFE/ZSOF	11,171,368	96,721	114,604.812
38	Nanchang Changbei International Airport	Nanchang	Jiangxi	KHN/ZSCN	10,205,783	87,995	59,990.932
39	Shijiazhuang Zhengding International Airport	Shijiazhuang	Hebei	SJW/ZBSJ	9,863,183	76,666	61,077.385
40	Wuxi Shuofang Airport	Wuxi / Suzhou	Jiangsu	WUX/ZSWX	8,797,707	71,892	125,555.664
41	Yinchuan Hedong International Airport	Yinchuan	Ningxia	INC/ZLIC	7,712,513	65,286	40,402.986
42	Yantai Penglai International Airport	Yantai	Shandong	YNT/ZSYT	7,530,370	71,468	75,234.072
43	Lijiang Sanyi International Airport	Lijiang	Yunnan	LJG/ZPLJ	7,440,858	57,899	15,569.000
44	Jieyang Chaoshan International Airport	Jieyang / Chaozhou / Shantou	Guangdong	SWA/ZGOW	7,182,236	60,686	30,132.920
45	Xining Caojiabao International Airport	Xining / Haidong	Qinghai	XNN/ZLXN	7,022,325	62,255	31,385.545
46	Xishuangbanna Gasa International Airport	Jinghong	Yunnan	JHG/ZPJH	6,934,208	52,543	17,291.528
47	Quanzhou Jinjiang International Airport	Quanzhou	Fujian	JJN/ZSQZ	6,723,782	53,638	64,251.457
48	Lhasa Gonggar International Airport	Lhasa / Shannan	Tibet	LXA/ZULS	5,471,404	44,908	41,613.160
49	Guilin Liangjiang International Airport	Guilin	Guangxi	KWL/ZGKL	5,258,592	44,488	17,591.012
50	Changzhou Benniu International Airport	Changzhou	Jiangsu	CZX/ZSCG	4,029,263	42,699	21,858.955
51	Nantong Xingdong International Airport	Nantong	Jiangsu	NTG/ZSNT	3,659,099	37,376	60,228.133
52	Kashgar Airport	Kashgar	Xinjiang	KHG/ZWSH	3,354,371	25,671	16,071.123
53	Yangzhou Taizhou International Airport	Yangzhou / Taizhou	Jiangsu	YTY/ZSYA	3,264,505	48,664	10,581.828
54	Mianyang Nanjiao Airport	Mianyang	Sichuan	MIG/ZUMY	3,103,772	193,536	6,923.143
55	Yichang Sanxia International Airport	Yichang	Hubei	YIH/ZHYC	3,007,545	66,936	4,562.941
56	Xuzhou Guanyin International Airport	Xuzhou	Jiangsu	XUZ/ZSXZ	2,993,250	28,370	9,764.233
57	Yiwu Airport	Yiwu	Zhejiang	YIW/ZSYW	2,965,746	24,018	15,244.180
58	Hulunbuir Hailar International Airport	Hailar	Inner Mongolia	HLD/ZBLA	2,912,502	24,647	4,783.134
59	Zhanjiang Wuchuan International Airport	Zhanjiang	Guangdong	ZHA/ZGZJ	2,744,435	27,104	7,282.300
60	Huizhou Pingtan Airport	Huizhou	Guangdong	HUZ/ZGHZ	2,617,937	21,190	8,708.726
61	Weihai Dashuipo International Airport	Weihai	Shandong	WEH/ZSWH	2,569,313	25,439	19,838.359
62	Ordos Ejin Horo International Airport	Ordos	Inner Mongolia	DSN/ZBDS	2,525,675	41,040	11,905.156
63	Korla Airport	Korla	Xinjiang	KRL/ZWKL	2,488,409	24,487	7,816.056
64	Zhoushan Putuoshan International Airport	Zhoushan	Zhejiang	HSN/ZSZS	2,399,221	31,186	2,271.647
65	Linyi Qiyang International Airport	Linyi	Shandong	LYI/ZSLY	2,339,114	35,905	7,744.937
66	Dali Fengyi Airport	Dali	Yunnan	DLU/ZPDL	2,336,367	22,167	6,683.572
67	Luzhou Yunlong Airport	Luzhou	Sichuan	LZO/ZULZ	2,303,102	27,409	5,037.001
68	Dehong Mangshi International Airport	Mangshi	Yunnan	LUM/ZPLX	2,266,993	19,604	10,602.441
69	Yulin Yuyang Airport	Yulin	Shaanxi	UYN/ZLYL	2,236,850	23,440	12,088.944
70	Yuncheng Zhangxiao Airport	Yuncheng	Shanxi	YCU/ZBYC	2,193,632	22,298	7,081.558
71	Aksu Onsu Airport	Aksu	Xinjiang	AKU/ZWAK	2,189,821	21,592	8,126.583
72	Beihai Fucheng Airport	Beihai	Guangxi	BHY/ZGBH	2,139,453	17,453	4,426.104
73	Yibin Wuliangye Airport	Yibin	Sichuan	YBP/ZUYB	2,050,861	19,415	8,439.371
74	Taizhou Luqiao Airport	Taizhou	Zhejiang	HYN/ZSLQ	2,017,274	16,858	10,566.610
75	Baotou Donghe International Airport	Baotou	Inner Mongolia	BAV/ZBOW	1,983,799	20,684	3,531.346
76	Chifeng Yulong Airport	Chifeng	Inner Mongolia	CIF/ZBCF	1,924,464	19,686	1,829.141
77	Ganzhou Huangjin Airport	Ganzhou	Jiangxi	KOW/ZSGZ	1,913,127	17,333	4,740.046
78	Xiangyang Liuji Airport	Xiangyang	Hubei	XFN/ZHXF	1,791,383	74,361	2,661.491
79	Ili Yining International Airport	Yining	Xinjiang	YIN/ZWYN	1,775,429	18,784	5,418.847
80	Yancheng Nanyang International Airport	Yancheng	Jiangsu	YNZ/ZSYN	1,689,430	16,114	4,205.946
81	Zunyi Maotai Airport	Renhuai	Guizhou	WMT/ZUMT	1,608,258	17,022	2,270.574
82	Huaian Lianshui International Airport	Huai'an	Jiangsu	HIA/ZSSH	1,599,282	41,890	19,073.488
83	Enshi Xujiaping International Airport	Enshi	Hubei	ENH/ZHES	1,594,802	15,145	1,614.725
84	Zunyi Xinzhou Airport	Zunyi	Guizhou	ZYI/ZUZY	1,578,400	14,918	1,278.009
85	Hotan Airport	Hotan	Xinjiang	HTN/ZWTN	1,532,462	14,918	7,431.121
86	Zhangjiajie Hehua International Airport	Zhangjiajie	Hunan	DYG/ZGDY	1,501,630	12,704	119.328
87	Lianyungang Huaguoshan International Airport	Lianyungang	Jiangsu	LYG/ZSLG	1,447,802	16,062	2,008.574
88	Yanji Chaoyangchuan International Airport	Yanji	Jilin	YNJ/ZYYJ	1,302,718	10,895	2,995.589
89	Liuzhou Bailian Airport	Liuzhou	Guangxi	LZH/ZGZH	1,253,370	11,610	4,482.011
90	Tongliao Airport	Tongliao	Inner Mongolia	TGO/ZBTL	1,242,504	16,152	1,995.178
91	Wuhu Xuanzhou Airport	Wuhu / Xuanzhou	Anhui	WUX/ZSWX	1,229,020	19,616	20,796.046
92	Dunhuang Mogao International Airport	Dunhuang	Gansu	DNH/ZLDH	1,223,490	11,045	1,647.040
93	Luoyang Beijiao Airport	Luoyang	Henan	LYA/ZHLY	1,210,899	205,980	757.253
94	Nanyang Jiangying Airport	Nanyang	Henan	NNY/ZHNY	1,100,471	51,521	504.473
95	Jining Da'an Airport	Jining	Shandong	JNG/ZSJG	1,091,602	10,122	1,887.846
96	Shiyan Wudangshan Airport	Shiyan	Hubei	WDS/ZHSY	1,084,325	12,567	1,167.009
97	Dazhou Jinya Airport	Dazhou	Sichuan	DZH/ZUDA	1,073,078	14,497	1,063.484
98	Foshan Shadi Airport	Foshan	Guangdong	FUO/ZGFS	1,072,886	8,093	0.100
99	Xichang Qingshan Airport	Xichang	Sichuan	XIC/ZUXC	1,069,233	11,765	1,554.749
100	Dongying Shengli Airport	Dongying	Shandong	DOY/ZSDY	1,066,242	47,230	976.777

=== 2022 final statistics ===
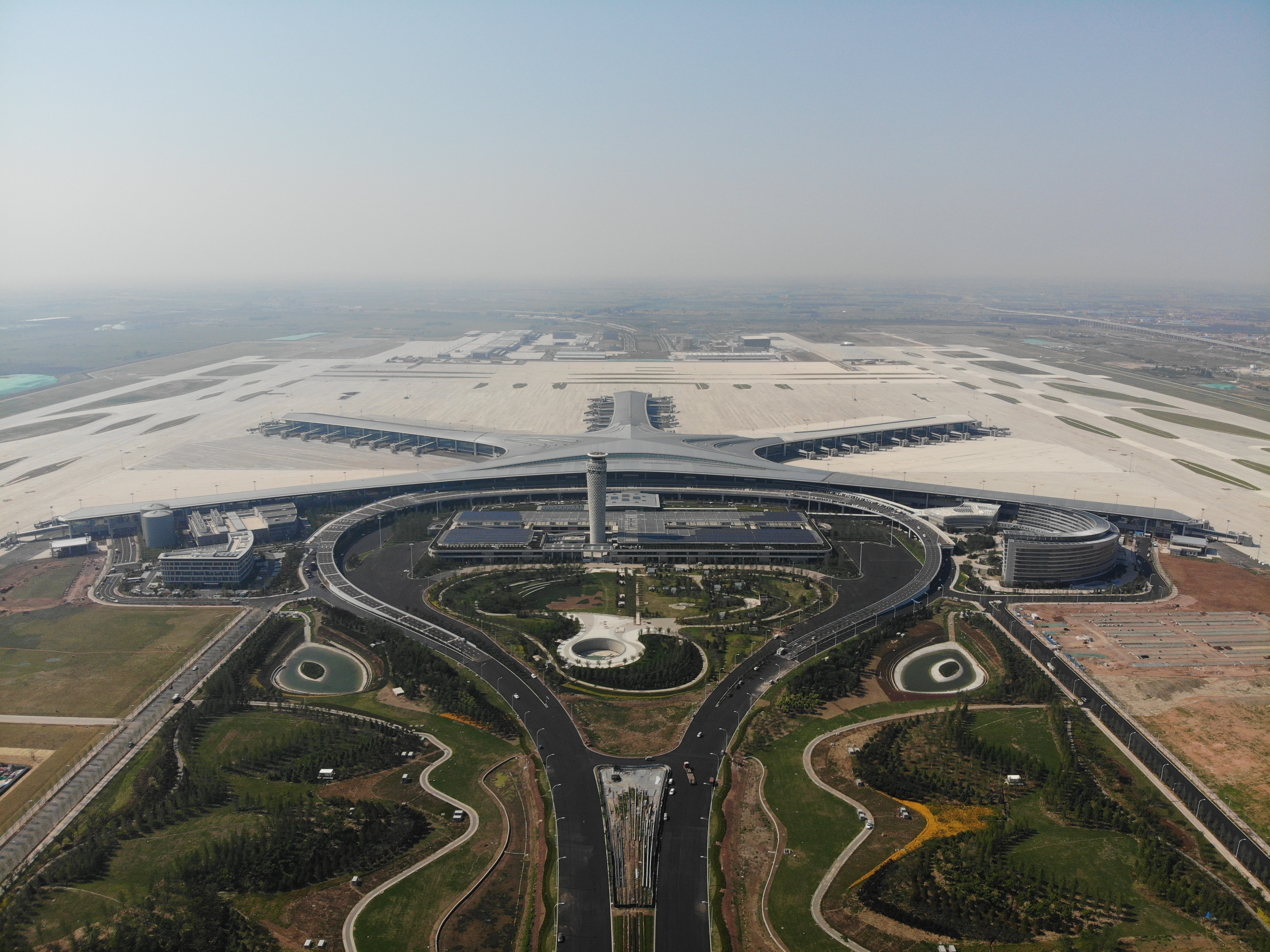
Qingdao Jiaodong International Airport is the latest addition as an important airport project in China. In 2022 the airport was the 20th busiest airport by passenger traffic and the busiest in Shandong Province.

The 100 busiest airports in China in 2022 ordered by total passenger traffic, according to CAAC statistics.

Rank	Airport	City served	Province	IATA/ICAO	Passengers	Aircraft	Cargo
1.	Guangzhou Baiyun International Airport	Guangzhou	Guangdong	CAN/ZGGG	26,104,989	266,627	1,884,082.0
2.	Chongqing Jiangbei International Airport	Chongqing	Chongqing	CKG/ZUCK	21,673,547	188,586	414,775.4
3.	Shenzhen Bao'an International Airport	Shenzhen	Guangdong	SZX/ZGSZ	21,563,437	235,693	1,506,955.0
4.	Kunming Changshui International Airport	Kunming	Yunnan	KMG/ZPPP	21,237,520	193,788	310,122.2
5.	Hangzhou Xiaoshan International Airport	Hangzhou	Zhejiang	HGH/ZSHC	20,038,078	190,400	829,831.4
6.	Chengdu Shuangliu International Airport	Chengdu	Sichuan	CTU/ZUUU	17,817,424	159,812	529,873.1
7.	Shanghai Hongqiao International Airport	Shanghai	Shanghai	SHA/ZSSS	14,711,588	122,668	184,538.1
8.	Shanghai Pudong International Airport	Shanghai	Shanghai	PVG/ZSPD	14,178,386	204,378	3,117,215.6
9.	Xi'an Xianyang International Airport	Xi'an, Xianyang	Shaanxi	XIY/ZLXY	13,558,364	125,857	206,288.5
10.	Chengdu Tianfu International Airport	Chengdu	Sichuan	TFU/ZUTF	13,275,946	120,270	81,664.9
11.	Beijing Capital International Airport	Beijing	Beijing	PEK/ZBAA	12,703,342	157,630	988,674.6
12.	Changsha Huanghua International Airport	Changsha	Hunan	CSX/ZGHA	12,508,779	114,123	155,768.0
13.	Nanjing Lukou International Airport	Nanjing	Jiangsu	NKG/ZSNJ	12,140,530	125,896	377,920.8
14.	Wuhan Tianhe International Airport	Wuhan	Hubei	WUH/ZHHH	11,606,393	115,062	298,655.2
15.	Haikou Meilan International Airport	Haikou	Hainan	HAK/ZJHK	11,162,161	105,675	124,372.9
16.	Beijing Daxing International Airport	Beijing	Beijing	PKX/ZBAD	10,277,623	105,922	127,497.2
17.	Xiamen Gaoqi International Airport	Xiamen	Fujian	XMN/ZSAM	10,125,604	99,838	262,105.2
18.	Ürümqi Diwopu International Airport	Ürümqi	Xinjiang	URC/ZWWW	10,035,368	89,661	93,683.1
19.	Guiyang Longdongbao International Airport	Guiyang	Guizhou	KWE/ZUGY	9,797,755	84,451	81,105.7
20.	Qingdao Jiaodong International Airport	Qingdao	Shandong	TAO/ZSQD	9,720,090	95,922	220,036.1
21.	Sanya Phoenix International Airport	Sanya	Hainan	SYX/ZJSY	9,514,348	76,503	63,292.6
22.	Harbin Taiping International Airport	Harbin	Heilongjiang	HRB/ZYHB	9,496,490	82,210	96,764.5
23.	Shenyang Taoxian International Airport	Shenyang	Liaoning	SHE/ZYTX	9,387,281	83,252	132,549.1
24.	Zhengzhou Xinzheng International Airport	Zhengzhou	Henan	CGO/ZHCC	9,221,674	94,427	624,654.1
25.	Jinan Yaoqiang International Airport	Jinan	Shandong	TNA/ZSJN	8,242,323	78,775	137,735.6
26.	Changchun Longjia International Airport	Changchun	Jilin	CGQ/ZYCC	7,213,077	61,951	60,497.9
27.	Nanning Wuxu International Airport	Nanning	Guangxi	NNG/ZGNN	6,659,516	66,560	151,858.1
28.	Dalian Zhoushuizi International Airport	Dalian	Liaoning	DLC/ZYTL	6,368,458	66,461	126,524.3
29.	Ningbo Lishe International Airport	Ningbo	Zhejiang	NGB/ZSNB	6,165,596	56,148	85,255.9
30.	Lanzhou Zhongchuan International Airport	Lanzhou	Gansu	LHW/ZLLL	5,942,431	58,001	55,504.1
31.	Tianjin Binhai International Airport	Tianjin	Tianjin	TSN/ZBTJ	5,841,680	60,173	131,516.9
32.	Fuzhou Changle International Airport	Fuzhou	Fujian	FOC/ZSFZ	5,739,444	58,216	91,837.4
33.	Hefei Xinqiao International Airport	Hefei	Anhui	HFE/ZSOF	5,712,698	56,893	76,578.6
34.	Wenzhou Longwan International Airport	Wenzhou	Zhejiang	WNZ/ZSWZ	5,607,918	52,994	61,914.1
35.	Shijiazhuang Zhengding International Airport	Shijiazhuang	Hebei	SJW/ZBSJ	5,562,763	53,334	43,444.6
36.	Taiyuan Wusu International Airport	Taiyuan, Jinzhong	Shanxi	TYN/ZBYN	5,526,997	54,958	40,068.4
37.	Nanchang Changbei International Airport	Nanchang	Jiangxi	KHN/ZSCN	4,724,634	49,304	40,159.2
38.	Hohhot Baita International Airport	Hohhot	Inner Mongolia	HET/ZBHH	4,539,904	49,550	30,138.3
39.	Zhuhai Jinwan Airport	Zhuhai	Guangdong	ZUH/ZGSD	4,005,732	39,487	28,462.2
40.	Yinchuan Hedong International Airport	Yinchuan	Ningxia	INC/ZLIC	3,785,776	37,434	26,138.7
41.	Sunan Shuofang International Airport	Wuxi, Suzhou	Jiangsu	WUX/ZSWX	3,768,868	37,770	97,992.7
42.	Quanzhou Jinjiang International Airport	Quanzhou	Fujian	JJN/ZSQZ	3,708,328	35,433	56,422.6
43.	Jieyang Chaoshan Airport	Jieyang, Chaozhou, Shantou	Guangdong	SWA/ZGOW	3,550,722	32,953	24,974.1
44.	Yantai Penglai International Airport	Yantai	Shandong	YNT/ZSYT	3,102,435	37,446	62,179.1
45.	Lijiang Sanyi Airport	Lijiang	Yunnan	LJG/ZPLJ	2,878,817	26,410	9,853.3
46.	Xining Caojiabao Airport	Xining, Haidong	Qinghai	XNN/ZLXN	2,609,436	28,596	15,937.5
47.	Lhasa Gonggar Airport	Lhasa, Shannan	Tibet	LXA/ZULS	2,583,646	27,321	28,950.4
48.	Xishuangbanna Gasa Airport	Jinghong	Yunnan	JHG/ZPJH	2,397,548	21,062	9,582.3
49.	Changzhou Benniu Airport	Changzhou	Jiangsu	CZX/ZSCG	1,947,335	32,116	30,562.1
50.	Guilin Liangjiang International Airport	Guilin	Guangxi	KWL/ZGKL	1,736,191	20,296	7,131.8
51.	Nantong Xingdong Airport	Nantong	Jiangsu	NTG/ZSNT	1,718,561	22,946	54,252.0
52.	Mianyang Nanjiao Airport	Mianyang	Sichuan	MIG/ZUMY	1,661,243	188,712	5,388.1
53.	Kashgar Airport	Kashgar	Xinjiang	KHG/ZWSH	1,551,057	14,131	8,613.3
54.	Yangzhou Taizhou Airport	Yangzhou, Taizhou	Jiangsu	YTY/ZSYA	1,394,426	41,576	8,761.8
55.	Xuzhou Guanyin Airport	Xuzhou	Jiangsu	XUZ/ZSXZ	1,347,458	18,909	5,878.6
56.	Zhanjiang Wuchuan Airport	Zhanjiang	Guangdong	ZHA/ZGZJ	1,317,170	16,604	3,834.5
57.	Yichang Sanxia Airport	Yichang	Hubei	YIH/ZHYC	1,252,477	88,256	2,205.3
58.	Luzhou Yunlong Airport	Luzhou	Sichuan	LZO/ZULZ	1,243,170	14,846	3,722.2
59.	Hulunbuir Hailar Airport	Hailar	Inner Mongolia	HLD/ZBLA	1,215,384	13,194	3,730.8
60.	Xichang Qingshan Airport	Xichang	Sichuan	XIC/ZUXC	1,183,527	14,050	1,561.4
61.	Linyi Qiyang Airport	Linyi	Shandong	LYI/ZSLY	1,182,825	32,686	6,229.3
62.	Xiangyang Liuji Airport	Xiangyang	Hubei	XFN/ZHXF	1,133,075	67,749	2,019.9
63.	Yibin Wuliangye Airport	Yibin	Sichuan	YBP/ZUYB	1,119,552	11,633	4,519.3
64.	Weihai Dashuibo Airport	Weihai	Shandong	WEH/ZSWH	1,108,242	14,576	15,201.8
65.	Dali Fengyi Airport	Dali	Yunnan	DLU/ZPDL	1,066,160	11,629	5,171.0
66.	Dehong Mangshi Airport	Mangshi	Yunnan	LUM/ZPLX	1,042,740	10,173	5,903.5
67.	Huizhou Pingtan Airport	Huizhou	Guangdong	HUZ/ZGHZ	1,035,008	10,951	6,905.2
68.	Korla Airport	Korla	Xinjiang	KRL/ZWKL	1,020,319	12,034	4,928.6
69.	Baotou Donghe Airport	Baotou	Inner Mongolia	BAV/ZBOW	1,018,957	12,572	2,437.3
70.	Aksu Onsu Airport	Aksu	Xinjiang	AKU/ZWAK	938,056	11,072	5,432.9
71.	Taizhou Luqiao Airport	Taizhou	Zhejiang	HYN/ZSLQ	927,298	8,917	8,275.1
72.	Yuncheng Zhangxiao Airport	Yuncheng	Shanxi	YCU/ZBYC	890,982	11,552	3,911.9
73.	Yancheng Nanyang Airport	Yancheng	Jiangsu	YNZ/ZSYN	876,131	9,468	3,248.9
74.	Ganzhou Huangjin Airport	Ganzhou	Jiangxi	KOW/ZSGZ	863,351	10,808	2,920.8
75.	Yiwu Airport	Yiwu	Zhejiang	YIW/ZSYW	862,057	9,905	7,959.9
76.	Yulin Yuyang Airport	Yulin	Shaanxi	UYN/ZLYL	845,845	10,866	3,450.1
77.	Chifeng Yulong Airport	Chifeng	Inner Mongolia	CIF/ZBCF	836,332	10,018	852.4
78.	Huai'an Lianshui Airport	Huai'an	Jiangsu	HIA/ZSSH	808,464	20,486	15,446.7
79.	Hotan Airport	Hotan	Xinjiang	HTN/ZWTN	791,084	8,532	4,277.9
80.	Zhoushan Putuoshan Airport	Zhoushan	Zhejiang	HSN/ZSZS	789,306	18,469	717.9
81.	Zunyi Xinzhou Airport	Zunyi	Guizhou	ZYI/ZUZY	767,553	9,210	1,089.5
82.	Ordos Ejin Horo Airport	Ordos	Inner Mongolia	DSN/ZBDS	721,439	19,213	4,395.7
83.	Luoyang Beijiao Airport	Luoyang	Henan	LYA/ZHLY	702,016	210,396	468.0
84.	Nanyang Jiangying Airport	Nanyang	Henan	NNY/ZHNY	676,738	60,246	556.4
85.	Zunyi Maotai Airport	Renhuai	Guizhou	WMT/ZUMT	669,915	8,214	1,081.9
86.	Beihai Fucheng Airport	Beihai	Guangxi	BHY/ZGBH	662,298	7,350	1,621.1
87.	Yining Airport	Yining	Xinjiang	YIN/ZWYN	649,473	7,594	3,041.9
88.	Jiamusi Dongjiao Airport	Jiamusi	Heilongjiang	JMU/ZYJM	638,982	6,294	1,063.5
89.	Wanzhou Wuqiao Airport	Wanzhou	Chongqing	WXN/ZUWX	605,582	7,788	763.1
90.	Nanchong Gaoping Airport	Nanchong	Sichuan	NAO/ZUNC	592,532	12,664	2,125.6
91.	Jining Qufu Airport	Jining	Shandong	JNG/ZSJG	590,130	6,904	2,013.5
92.	Lianyungang Huaguoshan International Airport	Lianyungang	Jiangsu	LYG/ZSLG	589,490	7,648	1,301.8
93.	Enshi Xujiaping Airport	Enshi	Hubei	ENH/ZHES	586,305	7,636	529.3
94.	Liuzhou Bailian Airport	Liuzhou	Guangxi	LZH/ZGZH	560,945	6,813	3,422.8
95.	Tongliao Airport	Tongliao	Inner Mongolia	TGO/ZBTL	545,158	8,692	911.4
96.	Baoshan Yunrui Airport	Baoshan	Yunnan	BSD/ZPBS	527,401	6,118	1,044.3
97.	Changde Taohuayuan Airport	Changde	Hunan	CGD/ZGCD	521,325	47,600	92.3
98.	Xingyi Wanfenglin Airport	Xingyi	Guizhou	ACX/ZUYI	516,808	7,198	1,218.4
99.	Ulanhot Yileleeteuk Airport	Ulanhot	Inner Mongolia	HLH/ZBUL	477,595	30,935	428.4
100.	Dazhou Jinya Airport	Dazhou	Sichuan	DZH/ZUDA	462,123	8,321	580.9

=== 2021 final statistics ===
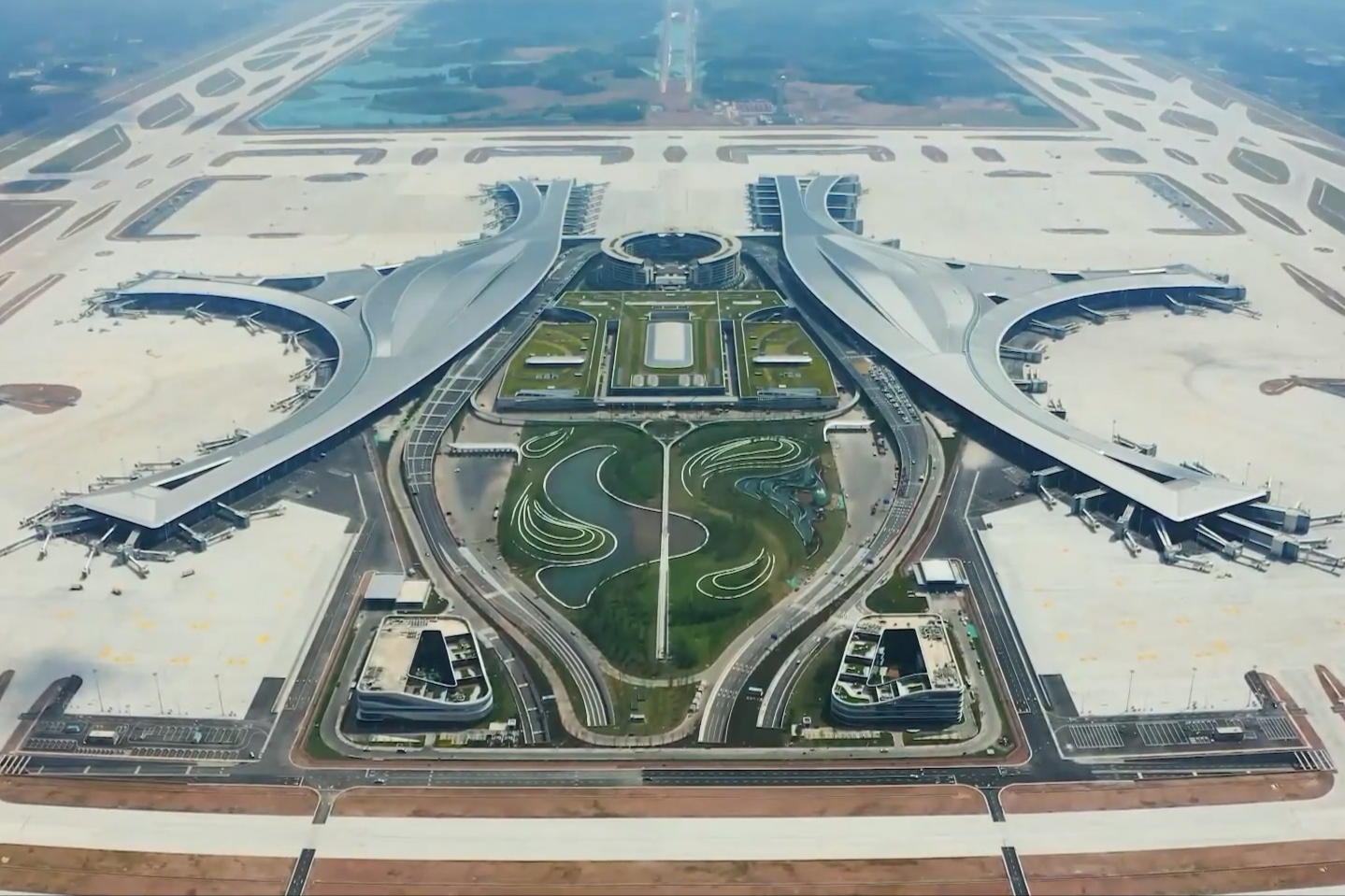
Chengdu Tianfu International Airport was inaugurated in June 2021 as the second international airport serving Chengdu, Sichuan province and appeared in the 2021 ranking as the 47th busiest airport by passenger traffic.

The 100 busiest airports in China in 2021 ordered by total passenger traffic, according to CAAC statistics.

Rank	Airport	City served	Division	IATA/ ICAO	Passengers	Aircraft	Cargo
1.	Guangzhou Baiyun International Airport	Guangzhou	Guangdong	CAN/ZGGG	40,249,679	362,470	2,044,908.7
2.	Chengdu Shuangliu International Airport	Chengdu	Sichuan	CTU/ZUUU	40,117,496	300,862	629,422.2
3.	Shenzhen Bao'an International Airport	Shenzhen	Guangdong	SZX/ZGSZ	36,358,185	317,855	1,568,274.5
4.	Chongqing Jiangbei International Airport	Chongqing	Chongqing	CKG/ZUCK	35,766,284	280,577	476,723.1
5.	Shanghai Hongqiao International Airport	Shanghai	Shanghai	SHA/ZSSS	33,207,337	231,261	383,405.5
6.	Beijing Capital International Airport	Beijing	Beijing	PEK/ZBAA	32,639,013	298,176	1,401,312.7
7.	Kunming Changshui International Airport	Kunming	Yunnan	KMG/ZPPP	32,221,295	279,471	377,225.4
8.	Shanghai Pudong International Airport	Shanghai	Shanghai	PVG/ZSPD	32,206,814	349,524	3,982,616.4
9.	Xi'an Xianyang International Airport	Xi'an, Xianyang	Shaanxi	XIY/ZLXY	30,173,312	256,965	395,604.5
10.	Hangzhou Xiaoshan International Airport	Hangzhou	Zhejiang	HGH/ZSHC	28,163,820	238,269	914,063.0
11.	Beijing Daxing International Airport	Beijing	Beijing	PKX/ZBAD	25,051,012	211,238	185,942.7
12.	Changsha Huanghua International Airport	Changsha	Hunan	CSX/ZGHA	19,983,064	162,977	209,074.5
13.	Wuhan Tianhe International Airport	Wuhan	Hubei	WUH/ZHHH	19,796,618	174,565	315,998.2
14.	Zhengzhou Xinzheng International Airport	Zhengzhou	Henan	CGO/ZHCC	18,954,907	161,162	704,748.9
15.	Nanjing Lukou International Airport	Nanjing	Jiangsu	NKG/ZSNJ	17,606,886	161,896	359,138.5
16.	Haikou Meilan International Airport	Haikou	Hainan	HAK/ZJHK	17,519,708	138,930	148,378.6
17.	Guiyang Longdongbao International Airport	Guiyang	Guizhou	KWE/ZUGY	16,964,158	134,639	115,242.6
18.	Ürümqi Diwopu International Airport	Ürümqi	Xinjiang	URC/ZWWW	16,880,507	138,724	137,444.8
19.	Sanya Phoenix International Airport	Sanya	Hainan	SYX/ZJSY	16,629,950	116,066	103,892.2
20.	Qingdao Jiaodong International Airport	Qingdao	Shandong	TAO/ZSQD	16,031,973	139,677	237,603.0
21.	Tianjin Binhai International Airport	Tianjin	Tianjin	TSN/ZBTJ	15,127,110	125,328	194,886.6
22.	Xiamen Gaoqi International Airport	Xiamen	Fujian	XMN/ZSAM	14,952,064	128,057	297,836.5
23.	Shenyang Taoxian International Airport	Shenyang	Liaoning	SHE/ZYTX	13,923,884	113,051	173,871.3
24.	Jinan Yaoqiang International Airport	Jinan	Shandong	TNA/ZSJN	13,616,212	112,746	168,135.2
25.	Harbin Taiping International Airport	Harbin	Heilongjiang	HRB/ZYHB	13,502,030	108,770	106,886.4
26.	Lanzhou Zhongchuan International Airport	Lanzhou	Gansu	LHW/ZLLL	12,171,160	102,688	73,108.3
27.	Changchun Longjia International Airport	Changchun	Jilin	CGQ/ZYCC	11,289,686	89,323	94,465.3
28.	Nanning Wuxu International Airport	Nanning	Guangxi	NNG/ZGNN	10,851,498	92,723	124,128.3
29.	Dalian Zhoushuizi International Airport	Dalian	Liaoning	DLC/ZYTL	10,365,478	92,479	137,671.0
30.	Taiyuan Wusu International Airport	Taiyuan, Jinzhong	Shanxi	TYN/ZBYN	9,995,334	88,951	55,646.9
31.	Nanchang Changbei International Airport	Nanchang	Jiangxi	KHN/ZSCN	9,795,967	90,904	173,394.4
32.	Ningbo Lishe International Airport	Ningbo	Zhejiang	NGB/ZSNB	9,462,501	77,705	112,685.6
33.	Wenzhou Longwan International Airport	Wenzhou	Zhejiang	WNZ/ZSWZ	9,231,409	80,592	73,241.4
34.	Fuzhou Changle International Airport	Fuzhou	Fujian	FOC/ZSFZ	9,037,195	81,523	152,742.7
35.	Hohhot Baita International Airport	Hohhot	Inner Mongolia	HET/ZBHH	9,006,388	84,325	45,291.3
36.	Hefei Xinqiao International Airport	Hefei	Anhui	HFE/ZSOF	8,795,391	77,547	93,721.0
37.	Zhuhai Jinwan Airport	Zhuhai	Guangdong	ZUH/ZGSD	8,020,230	69,073	40,046.8
38.	Sunan Shuofang International Airport	Wuxi, Suzhou	Jiangsu	WUX/ZSWX	7,126,411	65,650	163,395.2
39.	Yinchuan Hedong International Airport	Yinchuan	Ningxia	INC/ZLIC	6,998,424	64,311	42,021.9
40.	Shijiazhuang Zhengding International Airport	Shijiazhuang	Hebei	SJW/ZBSJ	6,451,083	53,605	33,298.6
41.	Quanzhou Jinjiang International Airport	Quanzhou	Fujian	JJN/ZSQZ	5,984,109	52,347	73,185.7
42.	Yantai Penglai International Airport	Yantai	Shandong	YNT/ZSYT	5,955,936	61,855	74,589.3
43.	Xining Caojiabao Airport	Xining, Haidong	Qinghai	XNN/ZLXN	5,864,258	57,020	33,820.8
44.	Jieyang Chaoshan Airport	Jieyang, Chaozhou, Shantou	Guangdong	SWA/ZGOW	5,734,175	50,333	31,235.0
45.	Lhasa Gonggar Airport	Lhasa, Shannan	Tibet	LXA/ZULS	4,779,386	44,449	45,105.7
46.	Guilin Liangjiang International Airport	Guilin	Guangxi	KWL/ZGKL	4,531,212	41,423	17,222.7
47.	Chengdu Tianfu International Airport	Chengdu	Sichuan	TFU/ZUTF	4,354,758	37,103	19,853.7
48.	Xishuangbanna Gasa Airport	Jinghong	Yunnan	JHG/ZPJH	4,267,978	36,675	13,719.5
49.	Lijiang Sanyi Airport	Lijiang	Yunnan	LJG/ZPLJ	4,220,618	39,192	14,212.6
50.	Mianyang Nanjiao Airport	Mianyang	Sichuan	MIG/ZUMY	2,980,409	188,894	7,347.3
51.	Changzhou Benniu Airport	Changzhou	Jiangsu	CZX/ZSCG	2,923,644	50,739	20,116.0
52.	Xuzhou Guanyin Airport	Xuzhou	Jiangsu	XUZ/ZSXZ	2,614,503	29,775	8,155.7
53.	Nantong Xingdong Airport	Nantong	Jiangsu	NTG/ZSNT	2,525,426	27,294	53,021.7
54.	Zhanjiang Airport	Zhanjiang	Guangdong	ZHA/ZGZJ	2,508,238	28,206	5,794.8
55.	Linyi Qiyang Airport	Linyi	Shandong	LYI/ZSLY	2,364,486	47,068	12,058.8
56.	Yangzhou Taizhou Airport	Yangzhou, Taizhou	Jiangsu	YTY/ZSYA	2,223,755	36,507	10,687.7
57.	Yichang Sanxia Airport	Yichang	Hubei	YIH/ZHYC	2,201,505	83,810	2,746.5
58.	Kashgar Airport	Kashgar	Xinjiang	KHG/ZWSH	2,171,947	19,104	10,577.6
59.	Luzhou Yunlong Airport	Luzhou	Sichuan	LZO/ZULZ	2,100,833	24,555	6,001.8
60.	Huizhou Pingtan Airport	Huizhou	Guangdong	HUZ/ZGHZ	2,008,153	18,749	8,556.4
61.	Weihai Dashuibo Airport	Weihai	Shandong	WEH/ZSWH	2,005,161	22,893	19,215.0
62.	Yuncheng Zhangxiao Airport	Yuncheng	Shanxi	YCU/ZBYC	1,919,323	24,229	7,306.5
63.	Beihai Fucheng Airport	Beihai	Guangxi	BHY/ZGBH	1,889,903	16,174	7,153.3
64.	Korla Airport	Korla	Xinjiang	KRL/ZWKL	1,839,281	20,227	8,247.5
65.	Hulunbuir Hailar Airport	Hailar	Inner Mongolia	HLD/ZBLA	1,825,229	17,076	5,459.9
66.	Ganzhou Huangjin Airport	Ganzhou	Jiangxi	KOW/ZSGZ	1,808,479	17,635	4,623.4
67.	Yancheng Nanyang Airport	Yancheng	Jiangsu	YNZ/ZSYN	1,754,272	19,057	10,087.9
68.	Xiangyang Liuji Airport	Xiangyang	Hubei	XFN/ZHXF	1,742,022	71,531	3,059.4
69.	Yulin Yuyang Airport	Yulin	Shaanxi	UYN/ZLYL	1,718,283	19,367	12,606.3
70.	Yiwu Airport	Yiwu	Zhejiang	YIW/ZSYW	1,677,265	16,506	14,249.3
71.	Aksu Onsu Airport	Aksu	Xinjiang	AKU/ZWAK	1,623,187	16,967	7,050.7
72.	Xichang Qingshan Airport	Xichang	Sichuan	XIC/ZUXC	1,595,315	17,454	4,564.8
73.	Yibin Wuliangye Airport	Yibin	Sichuan	YBP/ZUYB	1,543,792	15,815	6,372.1
74.	Ordos Ejin Horo Airport	Ordos	Inner Mongolia	DSN/ZBDS	1,502,958	29,828	7,283.5
75.	Zhoushan Putuoshan Airport	Zhoushan	Zhejiang	HSN/ZSZS	1,483,700	23,045	625.7
76.	Zhangjiajie Hehua Airport	Zhangjiajie	Hunan	DYG/ZGDY	1,433,164	14,722	2,628.1
77.	Chifeng Yulong Airport	Chifeng	Inner Mongolia	CIF/ZBCF	1,421,971	13,727	1,184.7
78.	Dali Huangcaoba Airport	Dali	Yunnan	DLU/ZPDL	1,420,494	15,999	6,651.0
79.	Zunyi Maotai Airport	Renhuai	Guizhou	WMT/ZUMT	1,413,381	16,104	829.1
80.	Huai'an Lianshui Airport	Huai'an	Jiangsu	HIA/ZSSH	1,404,683	31,194	19,637.4
81.	Taizhou Luqiao Airport	Taizhou	Zhejiang	HYN/ZSLQ	1,338,960	12,081	10,150.9
82.	Baotou Donghe Airport	Baotou	Inner Mongolia	BAV/ZBOW	1,336,911	14,320	2,927.0
83.	Enshi Xujiaping Airport	Enshi	Hubei	ENH/ZHES	1,301,477	13,370	1,448.2
84.	Zunyi Xinzhou Airport	Zunyi	Guizhou	ZYI/ZUZY	1,292,664	13,743	1,461.6
85.	Hotan Airport	Hotan	Xinjiang	HTN/ZWTN	1,290,889	13,527	6,327.1
86.	Dehong Mangshi Airport	Mangshi	Yunnan	LUM/ZPLX	1,237,937	12,584	8,271.9
87.	Luoyang Beijiao Airport	Luoyang	Henan	LYA/ZHLY	1,237,795	226,214	928.9
88.	Lianyungang Baitabu Airport	Lianyungang	Jiangsu	LYG/ZSLG	1,233,272	15,116	8,415.6
89.	Liuzhou Bailian Airport	Liuzhou	Guangxi	LZH/ZGZH	1,158,885	11,943	5,567.3
90.	Wanzhou Wuqiao Airport	Wanzhou	Chongqing	WXN/ZUWX	1,149,138	13,754	1,227.0
91.	Shiyan Wudangshan Airport	Shiyan	Hubei	WDS/ZHSY	1,132,398	13,930	1,508.0
92.	Nanyang Jiangying Airport	Nanyang	Henan	NNY/ZHNY	1,067,753	53,774	861.1
93.	Baoshan Yunrui Airport	Baoshan	Yunnan	BSD/ZPBS	1,016,445	11,663	1,708.9
94.	Changde Taohuayuan Airport	Changde	Hunan	CGD/ZGCD	1,008,348	60,030	458.7
95.	Jining Qufu Airport	Jining	Shandong	JNG/ZSJG	1,006,299	10,868	2,662.9
96.	Xingyi Wanfenglin Airport	Xingyi	Guizhou	ACX/ZUYI	1,001,683	11,783	2,039.6
97.	Tongliao Airport	Tongliao	Inner Mongolia	TGO/ZBTL	938,125	12,107	1,783.7
98.	Hengyang Nanyue Airport	Hengyang	Hunan	HNY/ZGHY	928,054	11,734	781.6
99.	Nanchong Gaoping Airport	Nanchong	Sichuan	NAO/ZUNC	923,789	17,394	3,154.3
100.	Datong Yungang Airport	Datong	Shanxi	DAT/ZBDT	885,224	21,468	1,602.7

=== 2020 final statistics ===
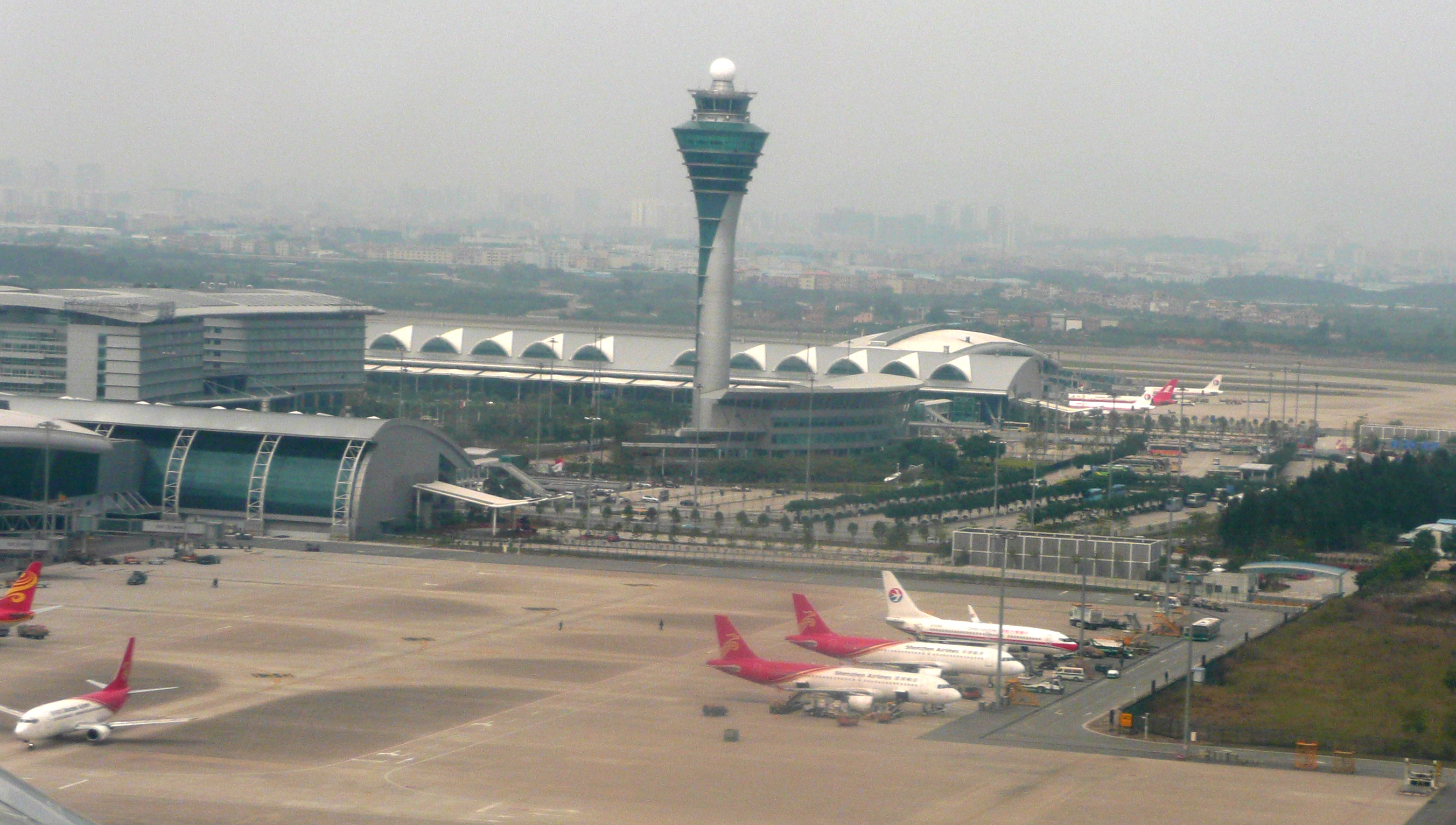
In a very uncommon year because of the COVID-19 pandemic, Guangzhou Baiyun International Airport became not just the busiest airport in China by passenger traffic, but also the busiest airport in the world.

The 100 busiest airports in China in 2020 ordered by total passenger traffic, according to CAAC statistics.

Rank	Airport	City served	Division	IATA/ ICAO	Passengers	Aircraft	Cargo
1.	Guangzhou Baiyun International Airport	Guangzhou	Guangdong	CAN/ZGGG	43,760,427	373,421	1,759,281.2
2.	Chengdu Shuangliu International Airport	Chengdu	Sichuan	CTU/ZUUU	40,741,509	311,797	618,527.7
3.	Shenzhen Bao'an International Airport	Shenzhen	Guangdong	SZX/ZGSZ	37,916,059	320,348	1,398,782.5
4.	Chongqing Jiangbei International Airport	Chongqing	Chongqing	CKG/ZUCK	34,937,789	274,659	411,239.6
5.	Beijing Capital International Airport	Beijing	Beijing	PEK/ZBAA	34,513,827	291,498	1,210,441.2
6.	Kunming Changshui International Airport	Kunming	Yunnan	KMG/ZPPP	32,989,127	274,433	324,989.8
7.	Shanghai Hongqiao International Airport	Shanghai	Shanghai	SHA/ZSSS	31,165,641	219,404	338,557.1
8.	Xi'an Xianyang International Airport	Xi'an, Xianyang	Shaanxi	XIY/ZLXY	31,073,884	255,652	376,310.9
9.	Shanghai Pudong International Airport	Shanghai	Shanghai	PVG/ZSPD	30,476,531	325,678	3,686,627.1
10.	Hangzhou Xiaoshan International Airport	Hangzhou	Zhejiang	HGH/ZSHC	28,224,342	237,362	802,049.1
11.	Zhengzhou Xinzheng International Airport	Zhengzhou	Henan	CGO/ZHCC	21,406,709	178,682	639,413.4
12.	Nanjing Lukou International Airport	Nanjing	Jiangsu	NKG/ZSNJ	19,906,576	181,725	389,362.4
13.	Changsha Huanghua International Airport	Changsha	Hunan	CSX/ZGHA	19,223,825	156,321	192,018.1
14.	Xiamen Gaoqi International Airport	Xiamen	Fujian	XMN/ZSAM	16,710,197	139,827	278,336.4
15.	Guiyang Longdongbao International Airport	Guiyang	Guizhou	KWE/ZUGY	16,583,878	134,606	113,452.0
16.	Haikou Meilan International Airport	Haikou	Hainan	HAK/ZJHK	16,490,216	129,726	134,717.9
17.	Beijing Daxing International Airport	Beijing	Beijing	PKX/ZBAD	16,091,449	133,114	77,252.9
18.	Sanya Phoenix International Airport	Sanya	Hainan	SYX/ZJSY	15,412,787	108,157	79,933.6
19.	Qingdao Liuting International Airport	Qingdao	Shandong	TAO/ZSQD	14,561,592	127,058	206,785.9
20.	Harbin Taiping International Airport	Harbin	Heilongjiang	HRB/ZYHB	13,508,687	108,444	112,052.4
21.	Tianjin Binhai International Airport	Tianjin	Tianjin	TSN/ZBTJ	13,285,478	115,770	184,980.4
22.	Shenyang Taoxian International Airport	Shenyang	Liaoning	SHE/ZYTX	13,181,452	107,268	171,985.9
23.	Wuhan Tianhe International Airport	Wuhan	Hubei	WUH/ZHHH	12,802,070	115,197	189,361.1
24.	Jinan Yaoqiang International Airport	Jinan	Shandong	TNA/ZSJN	12,384,736	102,375	146,571.3
25.	Ürümqi Diwopu International Airport	Ürümqi	Xinjiang	URC/ZWWW	11,152,723	100,096	122,005.4
26.	Lanzhou Zhongchuan International Airport	Lanzhou	Gansu	LHW/ZLLL	11,126,554	94,892	69,990.0
27.	Nanning Wuxu International Airport	Nanning	Guangxi	NNG/ZGNN	10,584,134	88,200	107,085.1
28.	Nanchang Changbei International Airport	Nanchang	Jiangxi	KHN/ZSCN	9,426,518	87,146	182,174.8
29.	Changchun Longjia International Airport	Changchun	Jilin	CGQ/ZYCC	9,360,541	75,510	83,671.9
30.	Taiyuan Wusu International Airport	Taiyuan, Jinzhong	Shanxi	TYN/ZBYN	9,013,205	79,299	50,788.1
31.	Ningbo Lishe International Airport	Ningbo	Zhejiang	NGB/ZSNB	8,971,579	75,373	119,155.9
32.	Fuzhou Changle International Airport	Fuzhou	Fujian	FOC/ZSFZ	8,861,811	82,768	119,970.1
33.	Wenzhou Longwan International Airport	Wenzhou	Zhejiang	WNZ/ZSWZ	8,787,200	73,717	73,571.6
34.	Hefei Xinqiao International Airport	Hefei	Anhui	HFE/ZSOF	8,594,344	74,838	87,505.6
35.	Dalian Zhoushuizi International Airport	Dalian	Liaoning	DLC/ZYTL	8,587,079	83,275	122,951.8
36.	Shijiazhuang Zhengding International Airport	Shijiazhuang	Hebei	SJW/ZBSJ	8,203,974	70,680	86,390.4
37.	Hohhot Baita International Airport	Hohhot	Inner Mongolia	HET/ZBHH	8,108,674	79,195	43,142.6
38.	Zhuhai Jinwan Airport	Zhuhai	Guangdong	ZUH/ZGSD	7,335,646	66,450	38,357.8
39.	Yinchuan Hedong International Airport	Yinchuan	Ningxia	INC/ZLIC	6,906,054	61,630	51,824.4
40.	Sunan Shuofang International Airport	Wuxi, Suzhou	Jiangsu	WUX/ZSWX	5,993,519	55,186	157,198.0
41.	Xining Caojiabao Airport	Xining, Haidong	Qinghai	XNN/ZLXN	5,862,059	54,565	38,788.1
42.	Yantai Penglai International Airport	Yantai	Shandong	YNT/ZSYT	5,791,514	61,335	67,371.3
43.	Quanzhou Jinjiang International Airport	Quanzhou	Fujian	JJN/ZSQZ	5,620,551	50,295	77,506.0
44.	Jieyang Chaoshan Airport	Jieyang, Chaozhou, Shantou	Guangdong	SWA/ZGOW	5,285,718	44,517	27,661.9
45.	Lijiang Sanyi Airport	Lijiang	Yunnan	LJG/ZPLJ	5,037,158	42,937	11,207.9
46.	Guilin Liangjiang International Airport	Guilin	Guangxi	KWL/ZGKL	4,351,377	39,290	15,442.9
47.	Lhasa Gonggar Airport	Lhasa, Shannan	Tibet	LXA/ZULS	4,133,192	36,762	41,920.2
48.	Xishuangbanna Gasa Airport	Jinghong	Yunnan	JHG/ZPJH	4,091,893	35,152	8,592.4
49.	Mianyang Nanjiao Airport	Mianyang	Sichuan	MIG/ZUMY	2,890,912	179,878	7,564.8
50.	Nantong Xingdong Airport	Nantong	Jiangsu	NTG/ZSNT	2,515,044	28,454	54,016.3
51.	Yangzhou Taizhou Airport	Yangzhou, Taizhou	Jiangsu	YTY/ZSYA	2,371,571	42,154	12,579.0
52.	Changzhou Benniu Airport	Changzhou	Jiangsu	CZX/ZSCG	2,255,238	38,323	18,911.3
53.	Zhanjiang Airport	Zhanjiang	Guangdong	ZHA/ZGZJ	2,231,708	25,478	5,747.1
54.	Xuzhou Guanyin Airport	Xuzhou	Jiangsu	XUZ/ZSXZ	2,201,097	34,568	11,346.1
55.	Huizhou Pingtan Airport	Huizhou	Guangdong	HUZ/ZGHZ	1,984,661	18,007	8,931.6
56.	Dehong Mangshi Airport	Mangshi	Yunnan	LUM/ZPLX	1,892,713	18,265	12,429.8
57.	Linyi Qiyang Airport	Linyi	Shandong	LYI/ZSLY	1,877,341	29,585	10,496.0
58.	Yichang Sanxia Airport	Yichang	Hubei	YIH/ZHYC	1,846,280	49,960	3,211.9
59.	Weihai Dashuibo Airport	Weihai	Shandong	WEH/ZSWH	1,807,384	19,467	8,858.9
60.	Yancheng Nanyang Airport	Yancheng	Jiangsu	YNZ/ZSYN	1,691,883	18,799	13,630.7
61.	Yuncheng Zhangxiao Airport	Yuncheng	Shanxi	YCU/ZBYC	1,638,066	26,094	5,372.9
62.	Beihai Fucheng Airport	Beihai	Guangxi	BHY/ZGBH	1,632,147	14,826	6,582.7
63.	Luzhou Yunlong Airport	Luzhou	Sichuan	LZO/ZULZ	1,624,263	23,629	5,643.2
64.	Yulin Yuyang Airport	Yulin	Shaanxi	UYN/ZLYL	1,621,591	18,680	12,860.7
65.	Zunyi Xinzhou Airport	Zunyi	Guizhou	ZYI/ZUZY	1,531,287	15,639	2,167.5
66.	Hulunbuir Hailar Airport	Hailar	Inner Mongolia	HLD/ZBLA	1,526,590	15,512	5,254.1
67.	Ganzhou Huangjin Airport	Ganzhou	Jiangxi	KOW/ZSGZ	1,461,715	15,142	4,083.1
68.	Zunyi Maotai Airport	Renhuai	Guizhou	WMT/ZUMT	1,450,420	17,845	970.8
69.	Korla Airport	Korla	Xinjiang	KRL/ZWKL	1,417,094	17,599	9,018.3
70.	Yiwu Airport	Yiwu	Zhejiang	YIW/ZSYW	1,366,207	13,677	12,584.8
71.	Ordos Ejin Horo Airport	Ordos	Inner Mongolia	DSN/ZBDS	1,364,931	21,544	5,012.1
72.	Huai'an Lianshui Airport	Huai'an	Jiangsu	HIA/ZSSH	1,326,809	34,135	12,343.1
73.	Dali Huangcaoba Airport	Dali	Yunnan	DLU/ZPDL	1,312,180	13,734	5,485.8
74.	Chifeng Yulong Airport	Chifeng	Inner Mongolia	CIF/ZBCF	1,290,608	12,733	2,258.1
75.	Zhangjiajie Hehua Airport	Zhangjiajie	Hunan	DYG/ZGDY	1,278,388	13,547	1,110.7
76.	Kashgar Airport	Kashgar	Xinjiang	KHG/ZWSH	1,272,042	12,824	8,505.6
77.	Aksu Onsu Airport	Aksu	Xinjiang	AKU/ZWAK	1,266,998	14,831	7,638.1
78.	Xiangyang Liuji Airport	Xiangyang	Hubei	XFN/ZHXF	1,214,621	73,847	2,849.3
79.	Baotou Donghe Airport	Baotou	Inner Mongolia	BAV/ZBOW	1,179,202	12,776	4,113.8
80.	Zhoushan Putuoshan Airport	Zhoushan	Zhejiang	HSN/ZSZS	1,141,491	20,250	893.5
81.	Taizhou Luqiao Airport	Taizhou	Zhejiang	HYN/ZSLQ	1,086,994	9,498	10,431.2
82.	Xingyi Wanfenglin Airport	Xingyi	Guizhou	ACX/ZUYI	1,042,558	12,536	782.9
83.	Liuzhou Bailian Airport	Liuzhou	Guangxi	LZH/ZGZH	1,012,860	10,991	5,515.4
84.	Wanzhou Wuqiao Airport	Wanzhou	Chongqing	WXN/ZUWX	1,007,287	15,217	1,170.4
85.	Hotan Airport	Hotan	Xinjiang	HTN/ZWTN	1,003,825	11,063	5,663.1
86.	Baoshan Yunrui Airport	Baoshan	Yunnan	BSD/ZPBS	976,878	10,398	1,317.7
87.	Changde Taohuayuan Airport	Changde	Hunan	CGD/ZGCD	965,844	66,305	525.3
88.	Lianyungang Baitabu Airport	Lianyungang	Jiangsu	LYG/ZSLG	965,336	11,826	1,937.2
89.	Luoyang Beijiao Airport	Luoyang	Henan	LYA/ZHLY	959,448	180,286	702.8
90.	Nanyang Jiangying Airport	Nanyang	Henan	NNY/ZHNY	955,606	46,644	849.5
91.	Xichang Qingshan Airport	Xichang	Sichuan	XIC/ZUXC	953,387	10,458	3,377.5
92.	Shiyan Wudangshan Airport	Shiyan	Hubei	WDS/ZHSY	948,966	11,369	760.9
93.	Enshi Xujiaping Airport	Enshi	Hubei	ENH/ZHES	932,914	8,925	594.6
94.	Yibin Wuliangye Airport	Yibin	Sichuan	YBP/ZUYB	913,093	10,245	5,467.1
95.	Hengyang Nanyue Airport	Hengyang	Hunan	HNY/ZGHY	860,850	10,724	1,523.6
96.	Tongliao Airport	Tongliao	Inner Mongolia	TGO/ZBTL	851,505	11,462	1,903.7
97.	Bijie Feixiong Airport	Bijie	Guizhou	BFJ/ZUBJ	777,257	10,415	575.0
98.	Nanchong Gaoping Airport	Nanchong	Sichuan	NAO/ZUNC	770,436	15,351	2,349.6
99.	Tengchong Tuofeng Airport	Tengchong	Yunnan	TCZ/ZUTC	770,250	8,420	1,800.4
100.	Datong Yungang Airport	Datong	Shanxi	DAT/ZBDT	745,373	16,699	1,635.6

== 2010s ==
=== 2019 final statistics ===
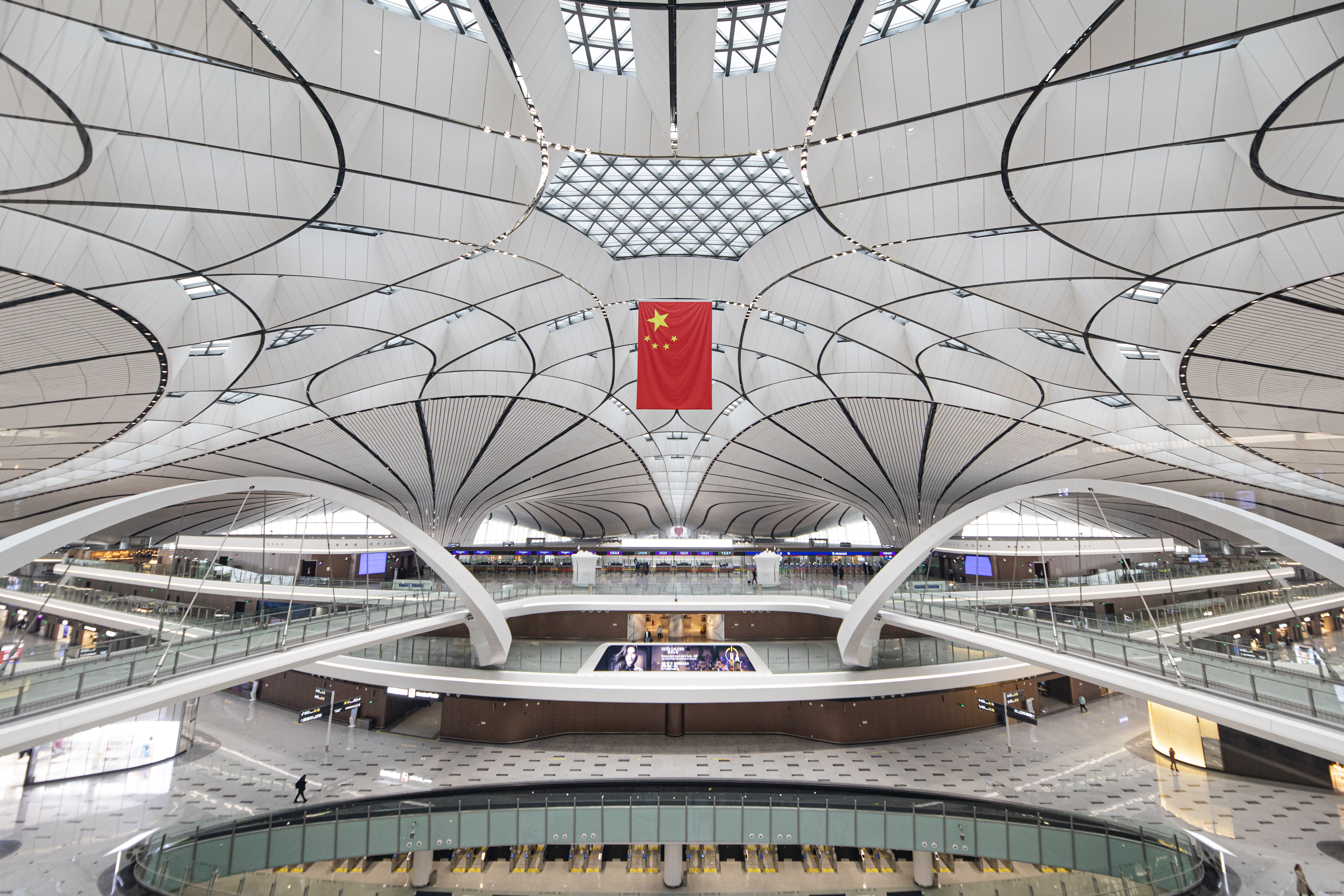
Beijing Daxing International Airport opened to the public in September 2019, and that year appeared as the 53rd busiest airport.

The 100 busiest airports in China in 2019 ordered by total passenger traffic, according to CAAC statistics.

Rank	Airport	City served	Division	IATA/ ICAO	Passengers	Aircraft	Cargo
1.	Beijing Capital International Airport	Beijing	Beijing	PEK/ZBAA	100,013,642	594,329	1,955,286.0
2.	Shanghai Pudong International Airport	Shanghai	Shanghai	PVG/ZSPD	76,153,455	511,846	3,634,230.4
3.	Guangzhou Baiyun International Airport	Guangzhou	Guangdong	CAN/ZGGG	73,378,475	491,249	1,919,926.9
4.	Chengdu Shuangliu International Airport	Chengdu	Sichuan	CTU/ZUUU	55,858,552	366,887	671,903.9
5.	Shenzhen Bao'an International Airport	Shenzhen	Guangdong	SZX/ZGSZ	52,931,925	370,180	1,283,385.6
6.	Kunming Changshui International Airport	Kunming	Yunnan	KMG/ZPPP	48,075,978	357,080	415,776.3
7.	Xi'an Xianyang International Airport	Xi'an, Xianyang	Shaanxi	XIY/ZLXY	47,220,547	345,748	381,869.6
8.	Shanghai Hongqiao International Airport	Shanghai	Shanghai	SHA/ZSSS	45,637,882	272,928	423,614.7
9.	Chongqing Jiangbei International Airport	Chongqing	Chongqing	CKG/ZUCK	44,786,722	318,398	410,928.6
10.	Hangzhou Xiaoshan International Airport	Hangzhou	Zhejiang	HGH/ZSHC	40,108,405	290,919	690,275.9
11.	Nanjing Lukou International Airport	Nanjing	Jiangsu	NKG/ZSNJ	30,581,685	234,869	374,633.5
12.	Zhengzhou Xinzheng International Airport	Zhengzhou	Henan	CGO/ZHCC	29,129,328	216,399	522,021.0
13.	Xiamen Gaoqi International Airport	Xiamen	Fujian	XMN/ZSAM	27,413,363	192,929	330,511.6
14.	Wuhan Tianhe International Airport	Wuhan	Hubei	WUH/ZHHH	27,150,246	203,131	243,193.4
15.	Changsha Huanghua International Airport	Changsha	Hunan	CSX/ZGHA	26,911,393	196,213	175,724.5
16.	Qingdao Liuting International Airport	Qingdao	Shandong	TAO/ZSQD	25,556,278	186,500	256,298.8
17.	Haikou Meilan International Airport	Haikou	Hainan	HAK/ZJHK	24,216,552	164,786	175,566.5
18.	Ürümqi Diwopu International Airport	Ürümqi	Xinjiang	URC/ZWWW	23,963,167	178,234	172,800.5
19.	Tianjin Binhai International Airport	Tianjin	Tianjin	TSN/ZBTJ	23,813,318	167,869	226,162.7
20.	Guiyang Longdongbao International Airport	Guiyang	Guizhou	KWE/ZUGY	21,910,911	167,063	120,110.2
21.	Harbin Taiping International Airport	Harbin	Heilongjiang	HRB/ZYHB	20,779,745	147,795	135,923.2
22.	Shenyang Taoxian International Airport	Shenyang	Liaoning	SHE/ZYTX	20,544,044	145,350	192,477.6
23.	Sanya Phoenix International Airport	Sanya	Hainan	SYX/ZJSY	20,163,655	124,813	99,821.0
24.	Dalian Zhoushuizi International Airport	Dalian	Liaoning	DLC/ZYTL	20,079,995	154,976	173,533.8
25.	Jinan Yaoqiang International Airport	Jinan	Shandong	TNA/ZSJN	17,560,507	129,994	135,263.0
26.	Nanning Wuxu International Airport	Nanning	Guangxi	NNG/ZGNN	15,762,341	114,658	122,248.9
27.	Lanzhou Zhongchuan International Airport	Lanzhou	Gansu	LHW/ZLLL	15,302,975	119,183	72,001.6
28.	Fuzhou Changle International Airport	Fuzhou	Fujian	FOC/ZSFZ	14,760,226	112,746	131,071.5
29.	Taiyuan Wusu International Airport	Taiyuan, Jinzhong	Shanxi	TYN/ZBYN	14,002,582	108,275	57,626.0
30.	Changchun Longjia International Airport	Changchun	Jilin	CGQ/ZYCC	13,934,969	98,816	88,901.6
31.	Nanchang Changbei International Airport	Nanchang	Jiangxi	KHN/ZSCN	13,637,151	108,036	122,517.3
32.	Hohhot Baita International Airport	Hohhot	Inner Mongolia	HET/ZBHH	13,151,840	112,159	46,157.1
33.	Ningbo Lishe International Airport	Ningbo	Zhejiang	NGB/ZSNB	12,414,007	89,487	106,120.2
34.	Wenzhou Longwan International Airport	Wenzhou	Zhejiang	WNZ/ZSWZ	12,291,701	92,296	81,106.6
35.	Zhuhai Jinwan Airport	Zhuhai	Guangdong	ZUH/ZGSD	12,282,982	88,989	50,989.4
36.	Hefei Xinqiao International Airport	Hefei	Anhui	HFE/ZSOF	12,282,384	95,135	87,101.6
37.	Shijiazhuang Zhengding International Airport	Shijiazhuang	Hebei	SJW/ZBSJ	11,922,801	90,970	53,229.7
38.	Yinchuan Hedong International Airport	Yinchuan	Ningxia	INC/ZLIC	10,575,393	84,734	61,245.8
39.	Yantai Penglai International Airport	Yantai	Shandong	YNT/ZSYT	10,052,929	86,441	57,060.9
40.	Guilin Liangjiang International Airport	Guilin	Guangxi	KWL/ZGKL	8,552,654	68,126	30,313.2
41.	Quanzhou Jinjiang International Airport	Quanzhou	Fujian	JJN/ZSQZ	8,435,805	65,012	75,294.6
42.	Sunan Shuofang International Airport	Wuxi, Suzhou	Jiangsu	WUX/ZSWX	7,973,446	62,483	145,128.2
43.	Jieyang Chaoshan Airport	Jieyang, Chaozhou, Shantou	Guangdong	SWA/ZGOW	7,353,521	55,905	27,810.9
44.	Xining Caojiabao Airport	Xining, Haidong	Qinghai	XNN/ZLXN	7,226,518	61,218	41,030.7
45.	Lijiang Sanyi Airport	Lijiang	Yunnan	LJG/ZPLJ	7,173,986	54,255	12,616.0
46.	Xishuangbanna Gasa Airport	Jinghong	Yunnan	JHG/ZPJH	5,524,284	43,034	8,418.2
47.	Beijing Nanyuan Airport	Beijing	Beijing	NAY/ZBNY	5,060,412	33,521	15,513.5
48.	Lhasa Gonggar Airport	Lhasa, Shannan	Tibet	LXA/ZULS	4,572,428	39,065	39,320.2
49.	Mianyang Nanjiao Airport	Mianyang	Sichuan	MIG/ZUMY	4,159,370	189,897	8,860.4
50.	Changzhou Benniu Airport	Changzhou	Jiangsu	CZX/ZSCG	4,052,342	55,446	33,161.0
51.	Nantong Xingdong Airport	Nantong	Jiangsu	NTG/ZSNT	3,484,484	34,580	42,263.1
52.	Yichang Sanxia Airport	Yichang	Hubei	YIH/ZHYC	3,263,912	86,190	4,597.4
53.	Beijing Daxing International Airport	Beijing	Beijing	PKX/ZBAD	3,135,074	21,048	7,362.3
54.	Weihai Dashuibo Airport	Weihai	Shandong	WEH/ZSWH	3,090,766	25,694	9,228.1
55.	Xuzhou Guanyin Airport	Xuzhou	Jiangsu	XUZ/ZSXZ	3,005,875	49,648	12,068.7
56.	Zhanjiang Airport	Zhanjiang	Guangdong	ZHA/ZGZJ	2,983,501	30,933	6,062.0
57.	Yangzhou Taizhou Airport	Yangzhou, Taizhou	Jiangsu	YTY/ZSYA	2,979,668	41,422	12,440.6
58.	Zhangjiajie Hehua Airport	Zhangjiajie	Hunan	DYG/ZGDY	2,870,898	25,570	1,779.9
59.	Ordos Ejin Horo Airport	Ordos	Inner Mongolia	DSN/ZBDS	2,695,925	34,155	10,046.6
60.	Beihai Fucheng Airport	Beihai	Guangxi	BHY/ZGBH	2,679,101	20,831	7,216.7
61.	Linyi Qiyang Airport	Linyi	Shandong	LYI/ZSLY	2,580,823	21,601	10,245.5
62.	Hulunbuir Hailar Airport	Hailar	Inner Mongolia	HLD/ZBLA	2,558,413	21,684	6,247.8
63.	Huizhou Pingtan Airport	Huizhou	Guangdong	HUZ/ZGHZ	2,553,545	20,251	8,915.7
64.	Yulin Yuyang Airport	Yulin	Shaanxi	UYN/ZLYL	2,531,468	23,906	8,017.6
65.	Yuncheng Zhangxiao Airport	Yuncheng	Shanxi	YCU/ZBYC	2,484,569	37,761	6,078.2
66.	Kashgar Airport	Kashgar	Xinjiang	KHG/ZWSH	2,433,209	20,736	10,383.9
67.	Huai'an Lianshui Airport	Huai'an	Jiangsu	HIA/ZSSH	2,347,566	45,573	10,259.3
68.	Baotou Donghe Airport	Baotou	Inner Mongolia	BAV/ZBOW	2,265,867	19,533	7,837.4
69.	Zunyi Xinzhou Airport	Zunyi	Guizhou	ZYI/ZUZY	2,257,147	20,759	3,611.9
70.	Korla Airport	Korla	Xinjiang	KRL/ZWKL	2,202,333	24,222	8,743.7
71.	Dehong Mangshi Airport	Mangshi	Yunnan	LUM/ZPLX	2,122,958	18,160	10,758.9
72.	Yancheng Nanyang Airport	Yancheng	Jiangsu	YNZ/ZSYN	2,090,304	19,099	8,684.4
73.	Ganzhou Huangjin Airport	Ganzhou	Jiangxi	KOW/ZSGZ	2,088,731	17,789	5,664.9
74.	Yiwu Airport	Yiwu	Zhejiang	YIW/ZSYW	2,029,109	15,511	10,612.9
75.	Lianyungang Baitabu Airport	Lianyungang	Jiangsu	LYG/ZSLG	1,922,824	18,118	3,342.9
76.	Xiangyang Liuji Airport	Xiangyang	Hubei	XFN/ZHXF	1,899,458	85,596	2,848.7
77.	Chifeng Yulong Airport	Chifeng	Inner Mongolia	CIF/ZBCF	1,893,600	17,451	2,362.1
78.	Luzhou Yunlong Airport	Luzhou	Sichuan	LZO/ZULZ	1,861,445	19,414	6,645.3
79.	Dali Huangcaoba Airport	Dali	Yunnan	DLU/ZPDL	1,773,857	17,331	6,870.6
80.	Aksu Onsu Airport	Aksu	Xinjiang	AKU/ZWAK	1,711,210	17,356	8,252.7
81.	Yanji Chaoyangchuan Airport	Yanji	Jilin	YNJ/ZYYJ	1,662,608	13,996	5,740.6
82.	Zunyi Maotai Airport	Renhuai	Guizhou	WMT/ZUMT	1,652,124	17,370	1,003.7
83.	Hotan Airport	Hotan	Xinjiang	HTN/ZWTN	1,596,218	14,507	5,704.7
84.	Liuzhou Bailian Airport	Liuzhou	Guangxi	LZH/ZGZH	1,571,055	13,864	8,671.9
85.	Luoyang Beijiao Airport	Luoyang	Henan	LYA/ZHLY	1,537,355	196,542	1,151.5
86.	Shiyan Wudangshan Airport	Shiyan	Hubei	WDS/ZHSY	1,524,107	15,087	1,041.5
87.	Zhoushan Putuoshan Airport	Zhoushan	Zhejiang	HSN/ZSZS	1,521,949	24,190	622.6
88.	Jining Qufu Airport	Jining	Shandong	JNG/ZSJG	1,487,810	11,608	2,974.9
89.	Yining Airport	Yining	Xinjiang	YIN/ZWYN	1,477,371	13,820	6,789.5
90.	Enshi Xujiaping Airport	Enshi	Hubei	ENH/ZHES	1,426,920	12,987	1,629.8
91.	Xingyi Wanfenglin Airport	Xingyi	Guizhou	ACX/ZUYI	1,384,614	14,814	1,364.2
92.	Taizhou Luqiao Airport	Taizhou	Zhejiang	HYN/ZSLQ	1,381,321	10,333	10,278.5
93.	Tengchong Tuofeng Airport	Tengchong	Yunnan	TCZ/ZUTC	1,367,494	12,542	3,005.7
94.	Datong Yungang Airport	Datong	Shanxi	DAT/ZBDT	1,307,139	23,506	1,923.8
95.	Baoshan Yunrui Airport	Baoshan	Yunnan	BSD/ZPBS	1,228,964	11,047	1,555.5
96.	Bijie Feixiong Airport	Bijie	Guizhou	BFJ/ZUBJ	1,217,071	14,220	743.2
97.	Nanyang Jiangying Airport	Nanyang	Henan	NNY/ZHNY	1,177,895	62,205	1,016.9
98.	Wanzhou Wuqiao Airport	Wanzhou	Chongqing	WXN/ZUWX	1,151,410	20,122	1,731.8
99.	Tongliao Airport	Tongliao	Inner Mongolia	TGO/ZBTL	1,128,515	19,532	2,042.6
100.	Changde Taohuayuan Airport	Changde	Hunan	CGD/ZGCD	1,106,061	92,522	361.3

=== 2018 final statistics ===
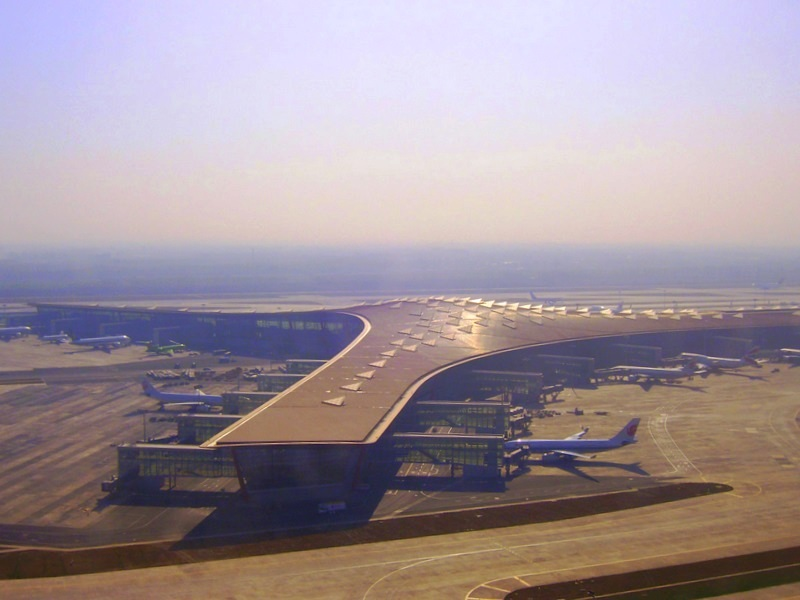
Beijing Capital International Airport, the busiest airport by passenger traffic in China and the second busiest airport in the world, hit the milestone of 100 million annual passengers for the first time in 2018, becoming the second airport worldwide to do so.

The 100 busiest airports in China in 2018 ordered by total passenger traffic, according to CAAC statistics.

Rank	Airport	City served	Division	IATA/ ICAO	Passengers	Aircraft	Cargo
1.	Beijing Capital International Airport	Beijing	Beijing	PEK/ZBAA	100,983,290	614,022	2,074,005.4
2.	Shanghai Pudong International Airport	Shanghai	Shanghai	PVG/ZSPD	74,006,331	504,794	3,768,572.6
3.	Guangzhou Baiyun International Airport	Guangzhou	Guangdong	CAN/ZGGG	69,720,403	477,364	1,890,560.0
4.	Chengdu Shuangliu International Airport	Chengdu	Sichuan	CTU/ZUUU	52,950,529	352,124	665,128.4
5.	Shenzhen Bao'an International Airport	Shenzhen	Guangdong	SZX/ZGSZ	49,348,950	355,907	1,218,502.2
6.	Kunming Changshui International Airport	Kunming	Yunnan	KMG/ZPPP	47,088,140	360,785	428,292.1
7.	Xi'an Xianyang International Airport	Xi'an, Xianyang	Shaanxi	XIY/ZLXY	44,653,311	330,477	312,637.1
8.	Shanghai Hongqiao International Airport	Shanghai	Shanghai	SHA/ZSSS	43,628,004	266,790	407,154.6
9.	Chongqing Jiangbei International Airport	Chongqing	Chongqing	CKG/ZUCK	41,595,887	300,745	382,160.8
10.	Hangzhou Xiaoshan International Airport	Hangzhou	Zhejiang	HGH/ZSHC	38,241,630	284,893	640,896.0
11.	Nanjing Lukou International Airport	Nanjing	Jiangsu	NKG/ZSNJ	28,581,546	220,849	365,054.4
12.	Zhengzhou Xinzheng International Airport	Zhengzhou	Henan	CGO/ZHCC	27,334,730	209,646	514,922.4
13.	Xiamen Gaoqi International Airport	Xiamen	Fujian	XMN/ZSAM	26,553,438	193,385	345,529.1
14.	Changsha Huanghua International Airport	Changsha	Hunan	CSX/ZGHA	25,266,251	186,772	155,513.1
15.	Qingdao Liuting International Airport	Qingdao	Shandong	TAO/ZSQD	24,535,738	182,642	224,533.8
16.	Wuhan Tianhe International Airport	Wuhan	Hubei	WUH/ZHHH	24,500,356	187,699	221,576.3
17.	Haikou Meilan International Airport	Haikou	Hainan	HAK/ZJHK	24,123,582	165,186	168,622.2
18.	Tianjin Binhai International Airport	Tianjin	Tianjin	TSN/ZBTJ	23,591,412	179,414	258,734.8
19.	Ürümqi Diwopu International Airport	Ürümqi	Xinjiang	URC/ZWWW	23,027,788	176,346	157,725.8
20.	Harbin Taiping International Airport	Harbin	Heilongjiang	HRB/ZYHB	20,431,432	146,416	125,042.0
21.	Guiyang Longdongbao International Airport	Guiyang	Guizhou	KWE/ZUGY	20,094,681	158,567	112,396.2
22.	Sanya Phoenix International Airport	Sanya	Hainan	SYX/ZJSY	20,039,035	123,507	95,132.9
23.	Shenyang Taoxian International Airport	Shenyang	Liaoning	SHE/ZYTX	19,027,398	137,661	168,558.0
24.	Dalian Zhoushuizi International Airport	Dalian	Liaoning	DLC/ZYTL	18,758,171	146,652	161,887.3
25.	Jinan Yaoqiang International Airport	Jinan	Shandong	TNA/ZSJN	16,611,795	126,828	113,627.9
26.	Nanning Wuxu International Airport	Nanning	Guangxi	NNG/ZGNN	15,091,614	113,474	118,035.6
27.	Fuzhou Changle International Airport	Fuzhou	Fujian	FOC/ZSFZ	14,393,532	110,243	133,189.4
28.	Lanzhou Zhongchuan International Airport	Lanzhou	Gansu	LHW/ZLLL	13,858,151	109,902	61,450.4
29.	Taiyuan Wusu International Airport	Taiyuan, Jinzhong	Shanxi	TYN/ZBYN	13,588,423	107,930	53,402.1
30.	Nanchang Changbei International Airport	Nanchang	Jiangxi	KHN/ZSCN	13,524,159	108,614	82,604.4
31.	Changchun Longjia International Airport	Changchun	Jilin	CGQ/ZYCC	12,969,503	92,807	83,093.0
32.	Hohhot Baita International Airport	Hohhot	Inner Mongolia	HET/ZBHH	12,159,175	105,328	40,210.1
33.	Ningbo Lishe International Airport	Ningbo	Zhejiang	NGB/ZSNB	11,718,416	85,434	105,673.2
34.	Shijiazhuang Zhengding International Airport	Shijiazhuang	Hebei	SJW/ZBSJ	11,332,518	89,717	46,145.9
35.	Zhuhai Jinwan Airport	Zhuhai	Guangdong	ZUH/ZGSD	11,220,703	85,380	46,393.0
36.	Wenzhou Longwan International Airport	Wenzhou	Zhejiang	WNZ/ZSWZ	11,218,701	86,362	80,189.5
37.	Hefei Xinqiao International Airport	Hefei	Anhui	HFE/ZSOF	11,110,596	89,005	69,787.3
38.	Yinchuan Hedong International Airport	Yinchuan	Ningxia	INC/ZLIC	8,944,837	75,635	50,733.5
39.	Guilin Liangjiang International Airport	Guilin	Guangxi	KWL/ZGKL	8,732,176	71,364	27,074.5
40.	Yantai Penglai International Airport	Yantai	Shandong	YNT/ZSYT	8,433,179	75,500	51,465.0
41.	Lijiang Sanyi Airport	Lijiang	Yunnan	LJG/ZPLJ	7,529,935	56,932	11,329.9
42.	Quanzhou Jinjiang International Airport	Quanzhou	Fujian	JJN/ZSQZ	7,443,161	58,319	63,845.4
43.	Sunan Shuofang International Airport	Wuxi, Suzhou	Jiangsu	WUX/ZSWX	7,207,529	56,066	123,818.9
44.	Beijing Nanyuan Airport	Beijing	Beijing	NAY/ZBNY	6,512,740	44,468	25,122.2
45.	Jieyang Chaoshan Airport	Jieyang, Chaozhou, Shantou	Guangdong	SWA/ZGOW	6,493,930	55,564	25,249.7
46.	Xining Caojiabao Airport	Xining, Haidong	Qinghai	XNN/ZLXN	6,339,622	55,064	33,879.1
47.	Xishuangbanna Gasa Airport	Jinghong	Yunnan	JHG/ZPJH	4,446,247	34,828	13,207.2
48.	Lhasa Gonggar Airport	Lhasa, Shannan	Tibet	LXA/ZULS	4,353,948	36,224	36,320.4
49.	Mianyang Nanjiao Airport	Mianyang	Sichuan	MIG/ZUMY	3,938,882	176,550	7,586.7
50.	Changzhou Benniu Airport	Changzhou	Jiangsu	CZX/ZSCG	3,327,722	45,676	28,170.1
51.	Yichang Sanxia Airport	Yichang	Hubei	YIH/ZHYC	2,948,668	76,526	4,441.1
52.	Nantong Xingdong Airport	Nantong	Jiangsu	NTG/ZSNT	2,771,326	33,781	42,989.9
53.	Zhanjiang Airport	Zhanjiang	Guangdong	ZHA/ZGZJ	2,559,507	28,961	5,945.1
54.	Xuzhou Guanyin Airport	Xuzhou	Jiangsu	XUZ/ZSXZ	2,518,799	51,770	10,065.7
55.	Weihai Dashuibo Airport	Weihai	Shandong	WEH/ZSWH	2,508,155	20,889	6,764.6
56.	Ordos Ejin Horo Airport	Ordos	Inner Mongolia	DSN/ZBDS	2,475,281	33,156	9,984.4
57.	Yangzhou Taizhou Airport	Yangzhou, Taizhou	Jiangsu	YTY/ZSYA	2,384,382	50,590	11,136.8
58.	Hulunbuir Hailar Airport	Hailar	Inner Mongolia	HLD/ZBLA	2,328,816	20,126	5,767.4
59.	Beihai Fucheng Airport	Beihai	Guangxi	BHY/ZGBH	2,282,218	18,427	6,446.1
60.	Zhangjiajie Hehua Airport	Zhangjiajie	Hunan	DYG/ZGDY	2,209,911	20,583	1,176.0
61.	Yulin Yuyang Airport	Yulin	Shaanxi	UYN/ZLYL	2,090,209	20,835	5,527.1
62.	Kashgar Airport	Kashgar	Xinjiang	KHG/ZWSH	2,060,100	17,643	8,225.0
63.	Yuncheng Zhangxiao Airport	Yuncheng	Shanxi	YCU/ZBYC	2,052,654	34,630	5,081.2
64.	Zunyi Xinzhou Airport	Zunyi	Guizhou	ZYI/ZUZY	2,033,587	18,902	2,315.9
65.	Baotou Donghe Airport	Baotou	Inner Mongolia	BAV/ZBOW	2,032,157	18,980	7,144.6
66.	Linyi Shubuling Airport	Linyi	Shandong	LYI/ZSLY	2,006,104	16,953	8,036.5
67.	Huizhou Pingtan Airport	Huizhou	Guangdong	HUZ/ZGHZ	1,879,645	15,110	5,501.3
68.	Yancheng Nanyang Airport	Yancheng	Jiangsu	YNZ/ZSYN	1,822,173	16,711	6,587.1
69.	Dehong Mangshi Airport	Mangshi	Yunnan	LUM/ZPLX	1,813,896	15,528	8,330.2
70.	Dali Huangcaoba Airport	Dali	Yunnan	DLU/ZPDL	1,776,364	17,293	6,723.9
71.	Korla Airport	Korla	Xinjiang	KRL/ZWKL	1,743,761	17,906	7,646.0
72.	Yiwu Airport	Yiwu	Zhejiang	YIW/ZSYW	1,635,673	12,558	8,800.1
73.	Ganzhou Huangjin Airport	Ganzhou	Jiangxi	KOW/ZSGZ	1,625,224	14,998	5,063.1
74.	Chifeng Yulong Airport	Chifeng	Inner Mongolia	CIF/ZBCF	1,572,060	14,988	2,144.0
75.	Huai'an Lianshui Airport	Huai'an	Jiangsu	HIA/ZSSH	1,516,272	26,082	6,286.0
76.	Lianyungang Baitabu Airport	Lianyungang	Jiangsu	LYG/ZSLG	1,516,195	14,978	2,906.4
77.	Yanji Chaoyangchuan Airport	Yanji	Jilin	YNJ/ZYYJ	1,513,262	12,638	5,459.7
78.	Xiangyang Liuji Airport	Xiangyang	Hubei	XFN/ZHXF	1,406,384	69,833	2,632.3
79.	Liuzhou Bailian Airport	Liuzhou	Guangxi	LZH/ZGZH	1,347,142	12,616	5,847.5
80.	Yining Airport	Yining	Xinjiang	YIN/ZWYN	1,332,536	12,493	4,885.8
81.	Luoyang Beijiao Airport	Luoyang	Henan	LYA/ZHLY	1,313,764	180,226	1,326.2
82.	Aksu Onsu Airport	Aksu	Xinjiang	AKU/ZWAK	1,292,215	11,590	6,633.3
83.	Tongren Fenghuang Airport	Tongren	Guizhou	TEN/ZUTR	1,276,640	13,506	173.9
84.	Jining Qufu Airport	Jining	Shandong	JNG/ZSJG	1,221,518	10,178	2,659.7
85.	Hotan Airport	Hotan	Xinjiang	HTN/ZWTN	1,217,504	10,113	3,262.7
86.	Bijie Feixiong Airport	Bijie	Guizhou	BFJ/ZUBJ	1,216,557	13,622	835.1
87.	Zhoushan Putuoshan Airport	Zhoushan	Zhejiang	HSN/ZSZS	1,209,675	24,542	112.4
88.	Shiyan Wudangshan Airport	Shiyan	Hubei	WDS/ZHSY	1,182,546	12,520	502.2
89.	Tengchong Tuofeng Airport	Tengchong	Yunnan	TCZ/ZUTC	1,170,230	10,691	2,265.0
90.	Xingyi Wanfenglin Airport	Xingyi	Guizhou	ACX/ZUYI	1,120,857	12,383	1,139.0
91.	Taizhou Luqiao Airport	Taizhou	Zhejiang	HYN/ZSLQ	1,112,199	8,268	7,581.4
92.	Enshi Xujiaping Airport	Enshi	Hubei	ENH/ZHES	1,039,311	9,434	1,704.6
93.	Datong Yungang Airport	Datong	Shanxi	DAT/ZBDT	1,016,273	28,216	1,615.2
94.	Baoshan Yunrui Airport	Baoshan	Yunnan	BSD/ZPBS	1,016,018	9,423	1,364.0
95.	Zunyi Maotai Airport	Renhuai	Guizhou	WMT/ZUMT	1,005,463	10,479	309.1
96.	Tongliao Airport	Tongliao	Inner Mongolia	TGO/ZBTL	983,058	43,447	1,837.1
97.	Yibin Caiba Airport	Yibin	Sichuan	YBP/ZUYB	974,810	9,633	3,225.1
98.	Nanchong Gaoping Airport	Nanchong	Sichuan	NAO/ZUNC	942,932	41,326	3,720.1
99.	Mudanjiang Hailang International Airport	Mudanjiang	Heilongjiang	MDG/ZYMD	933,716	7,464	1,237.0
100.	Nanyang Jiangying Airport	Nanyang	Henan	NNY/ZHNY	907,505	52,987	1,084.6

=== 2017 final statistics ===
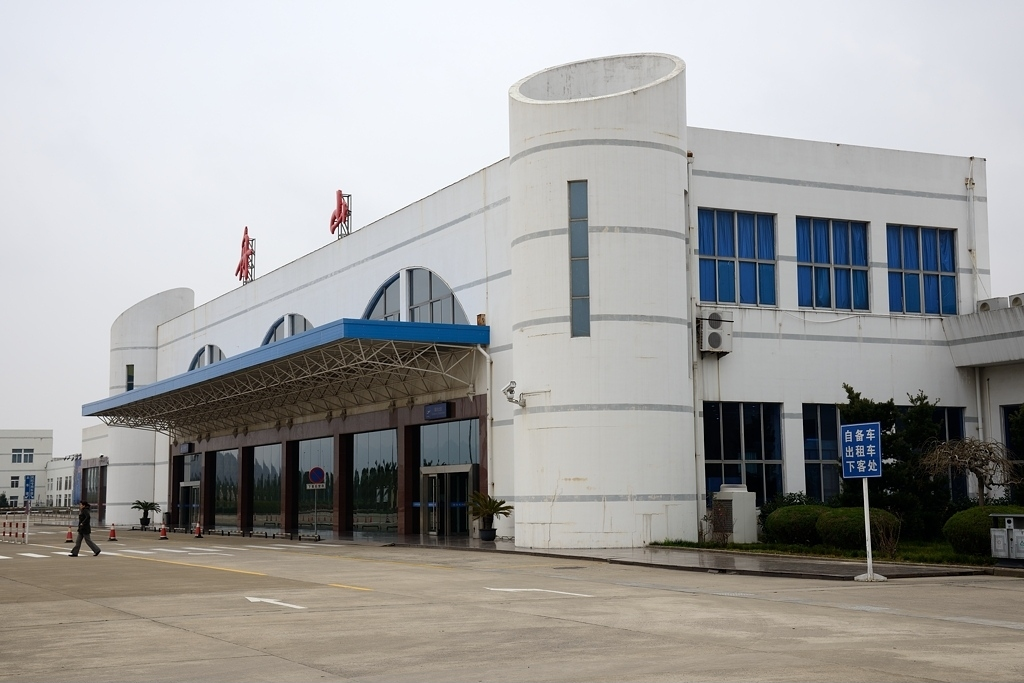
Zhoushan Putuoshan Airport, No. 84 in the top 100 of 2017, completes the list of Chinese airports that reached more than one million passengers per year. China is the second largest civil aviation market in the world after the United States.

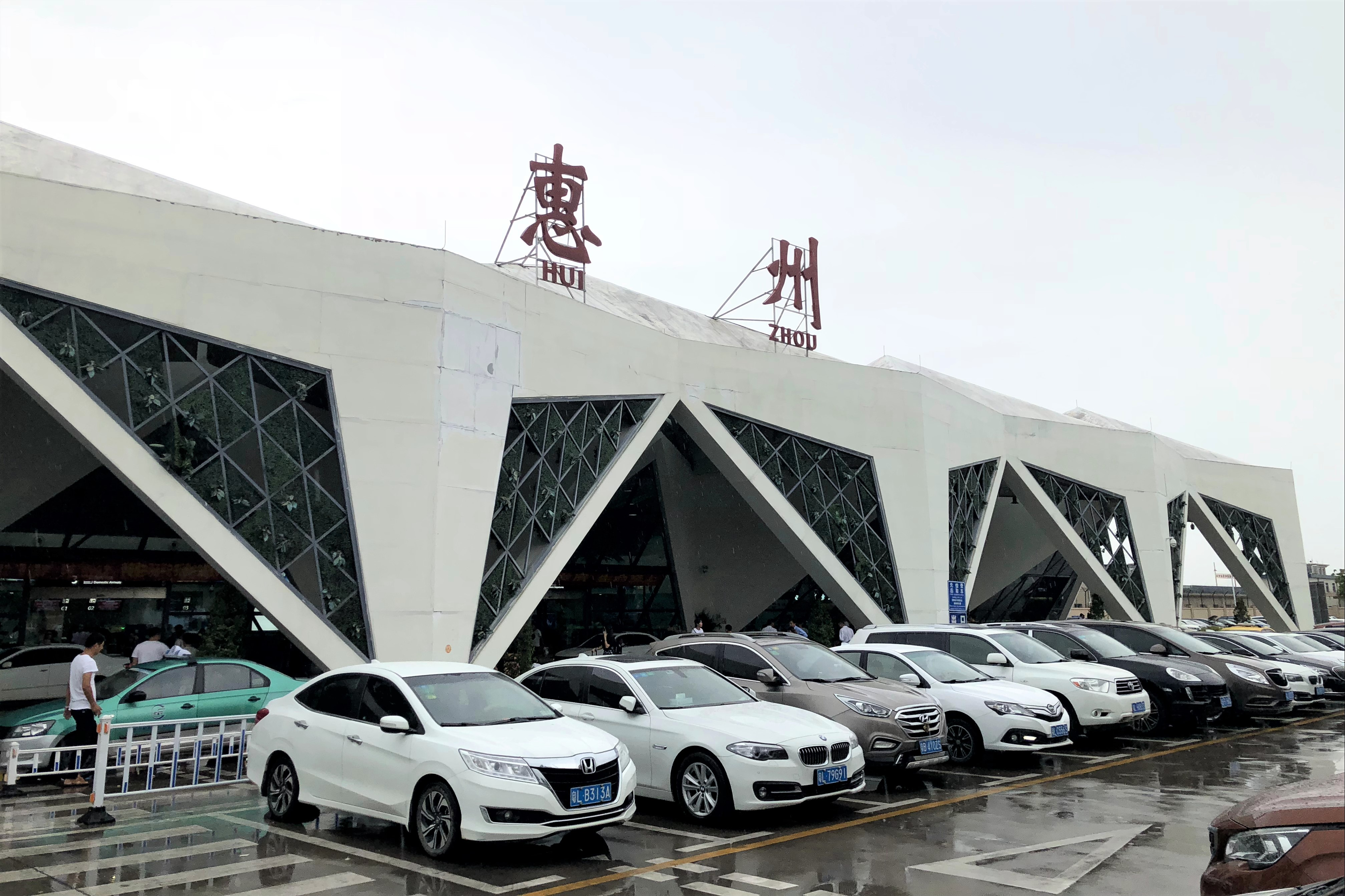
Six new airports entered the top 100 of busiest Chinese airports by passenger traffic, being Huizhou Pingtan Airport the busiest between the newcomers in 2017

The 100 busiest airports in China in 2017 ordered by total passenger traffic, according to the CAAC.

Rank	Airport	City served	Division	IATA/ ICAO	Passengers	Aircraft	Cargo
1.	Beijing Capital International Airport	Beijing	Beijing	PEK/ZBAA	95,786,296	597,259	2,029,583.6
2.	Shanghai Pudong International Airport	Shanghai	Shanghai	PVG/ZSPD	70,001,237	496,774	3,824,279.9
3.	Guangzhou Baiyun International Airport	Guangzhou	Guangdong	CAN/ZGGG	65,806,977	465,295	1,780,423.1
4.	Chengdu Shuangliu International Airport	Chengdu	Sichuan	CTU/ZUUU	49,801,693	337,055	642,872.0
5.	Shenzhen Bao'an International Airport	Shenzhen	Guangdong	SZX/ZGSZ	45,610,651	340,385	1,159,018.6
6.	Kunming Changshui International Airport	Kunming	Yunnan	KMG/ZPPP	44,727,691	350,273	418,033.6
7.	Shanghai Hongqiao International Airport	Shanghai	Shanghai	SHA/ZSSS	41,884,059	263,586	407,461.1
8.	Xi'an Xianyang International Airport	Xi'an, Xianyang	Shaanxi	XIY/ZLXY	41,857,229	318,959	259,872.5
9.	Chongqing Jiangbei International Airport	Chongqing	Chongqing	CKG/ZUCK	38,715,210	288,598	366,278.3
10.	Hangzhou Xiaoshan International Airport	Hangzhou	Zhejiang	HGH/ZSHC	35,570,411	271,066	589,461.6
11.	Nanjing Lukou International Airport	Nanjing	Jiangsu	NKG/ZSNJ	25,822,936	209,394	374,214.9
12.	Xiamen Gaoqi International Airport	Xiamen	Fujian	XMN/ZSAM	24,485,239	186,454	338,655.7
13.	Zhengzhou Xinzheng International Airport	Zhengzhou	Henan	CGO/ZHCC	24,299,073	195,717	502,714.8
14.	Changsha Huanghua International Airport	Changsha	Hunan	CSX/ZGHA	23,764,820	179,575	138,737.6
15.	Qingdao Liuting International Airport	Qingdao	Shandong	TAO/ZSQD	23,210,530	179,592	232,063.9
16.	Wuhan Tianhe International Airport	Wuhan	Hubei	WUH/ZHHH	23,129,400	183,883	185,016.7
17.	Haikou Meilan International Airport	Haikou	Hainan	HAK/ZJHK	22,584,815	157,535	154,496.0
18.	Ürümqi Diwopu International Airport	Ürümqi	Xinjiang	URC/ZWWW	20,500,901	167,822	156,741.5
19.	Tianjin Binhai International Airport	Tianjin	Tianjin	TSN/ZBTJ	21,005,001	169,585	268,283.5
20.	Sanya Phoenix International Airport	Sanya	Hainan	SYX/ZJSY	19,389,936	121,558	89,115.9
21.	Harbin Taiping International Airport	Harbin	Heilongjiang	HRB/ZYHB	18,810,317	136,803	121,176.2
22.	Guiyang Longdongbao International Airport	Guiyang	Guizhou	KWE/ZUGY	18,109,610	149,050	102,369.7
23.	Dalian Zhoushuizi International Airport	Dalian	Liaoning	DLC/ZYTL	17,503,810	141,428	164,777.6
24.	Shenyang Taoxian International Airport	Shenyang	Liaoning	SHE/ZYTX	17,342,626	127,387	159,117.1
25.	Jinan Yaoqiang International Airport	Jinan	Shandong	TNA/ZSJN	14,319,264	115,529	95,151.5
26.	Nanning Wuxu International Airport	Nanning	Guangxi	NNG/ZGNN	13,915,542	108,049	110,444.2
27.	Lanzhou Zhongchuan International Airport	Lanzhou	Gansu	LHW/ZLLL	12,816,443	103,690	60,905.5
28.	Fuzhou Changle International Airport	Fuzhou	Fujian	FOC/ZSFZ	12,469,235	98,908	125,602.7
29.	Taiyuan Wusu International Airport	Taiyuan, Jinzhong	Shanxi	TYN/ZBYN	12,401,086	101,076	48,428.4
30.	Changchun Longjia International Airport	Changchun	Jilin	CGQ/ZYCC	11,662,943	86,041	88,907.3
31.	Nanchang Changbei International Airport	Nanchang	Jiangxi	KHN/ZSCN	10,937,105	89,863	52,262.4
32.	Hohhot Baita International Airport	Hohhot	Inner Mongolia	HET/ZBHH	10,348,617	96,872	39,611.3
33.	Shijiazhuang Zhengding International Airport	Shijiazhuang	Hebei	SJW/ZBSJ	9,582,921	80,492	41,013.2
34.	Ningbo Lishe International Airport	Ningbo	Zhejiang	NGB/ZSNB	9,390,527	73,257	120,446.9
35.	Wenzhou Longwan International Airport	Wenzhou	Zhejiang	WNZ/ZSWZ	9,285,621	74,505	75,531.9
36.	Zhuhai Jinwan Airport	Zhuhai	Guangdong	ZUH/ZGSD	9,216,808	74,694	37,379.0
37.	Hefei Xinqiao International Airport	Hefei	Anhui	HFE/ZSOF	9,147,128	76,263	63,575.0
38.	Yinchuan Hedong International Airport	Yinchuan	Ningxia	INC/ZLIC	7,936,445	67,059	42,181.6
39.	Guilin Liangjiang International Airport	Guilin	Guangxi	KWL/ZGKL	7,862,015	64,260	24,188.3
40.	Lijiang Sanyi Airport	Lijiang	Yunnan	LJG/ZPLJ	7,105,345	54,250	10,265.6
41.	Sunan Shuofang International Airport	Wuxi, Suzhou	Jiangsu	WUX/ZSWX	6,683,380	52,839	107,598.1
42.	Yantai Penglai International Airport	Yantai	Shandong	YNT/ZSYT	6,503,015	62,105	41,140.7
43.	Beijing Nanyuan Airport	Beijing	Beijing	NAY/ZBNY	5,953,883	41,340	23,204.9
44.	Xining Caojiabao Airport	Xining, Haidong	Qinghai	XNN/ZLXN	5,627,696	48,529	27,687.2
45.	Quanzhou Jinjiang International Airport	Quanzhou	Fujian	JJN/ZSQZ	5,340,586	43,926	59,277.8
46.	Jieyang Chaoshan Airport	Jieyang, Chaozhou, Shantou	Guangdong	SWA/ZGOW	4,851,015	49,109	26,271.4
47.	Xishuangbanna Gasa Airport	Jinghong	Yunnan	JHG/ZPJH	3,990,867	31,925	13,060.7
48.	Lhasa Gonggar Airport	Lhasa, Shannan	Tibet	LXA/ZULS	3,718,350	32,561	32,364.9
49.	Mianyang Nanjiao Airport	Mianyang	Sichuan	MIG/ZUMY	3,543,403	169,088	7,225.0
50.	Changzhou Benniu Airport	Changzhou	Jiangsu	CZX/ZSCG	2,510,512	40,498	18,871.3
51.	Yichang Sanxia Airport	Yichang	Hubei	YIH/ZHYC	2,243,812	76,974	4,205.7
52.	Hulunbuir Hailar Airport	Hailar	Inner Mongolia	HLD/ZBLA	2,169,197	18,464	5,000.0
53.	Ordos Ejin Horo Airport	Ordos	Inner Mongolia	DSN/ZBDS	2,105,842	45,483	11,815.8
54.	Zhanjiang Airport	Zhanjiang	Guangdong	ZHA/ZGZJ	2,090,568	25,487	5,238.9
55.	Baotou Erliban Airport	Baotou	Inner Mongolia	BAV/ZBOW	2,089,009	20,668	8,981.5
56.	Kashgar Airport	Kashgar	Xinjiang	KHG/ZWSH	2,048,004	30,679	7,718.7
57.	Weihai Dashuibo Airport	Weihai	Shandong	WEH/ZSWH	2,037,485	17,780	5,729.0
58.	Nantong Xingdong Airport	Nantong	Jiangsu	NTG/ZSNT	2,009,038	28,623	39,447.3
59.	Xuzhou Guanyin Airport	Xuzhou	Jiangsu	XUZ/ZSXZ	1,916,517	36,537	9,232.9
60.	Yangzhou Taizhou Airport	Yangzhou, Taizhou	Jiangsu	YTY/ZSYA	1,836,515	55,503	9,377.6
61.	Zhangjiajie Hehua Airport	Zhangjiajie	Hunan	DYG/ZGDY	1,773,700	17,289	1,426.3
62.	Yulin Yuyang Airport	Yulin	Shaanxi	UYN/ZLYL	1,771,190	18,327	4,178.5
63.	Beihai Fucheng Airport	Beihai	Guangxi	BHY/ZGBH	1,711,199	16,635	5,511.2
64.	Dehong Mangshi Airport	Mangshi	Yunnan	LUM/ZPLX	1,652,533	13,982	8,510.5
65.	Dali Huangcaoba Airport	Dali	Yunnan	DLU/ZPDL	1,581,271	15,105	5,907.5
66.	Zunyi Xinzhou Airport	Zunyi	Guizhou	ZYI/ZUZY	1,561,066	15,310	1,618.1
67.	Yuncheng Zhangxiao Airport	Yuncheng	Shanxi	YCU/ZBYC	1,444,590	32,265	3,173.0
68.	Yanji Chaoyangchuan Airport	Yanji	Jilin	YNJ/ZYYJ	1,411,859	11,674	6,354.6
69.	Tongren Fenghuang Airport	Tongren	Guizhou	TEN/ZUTR	1,344,928	19,126	131.9
70.	Linyi Shubuling Airport	Linyi	Shandong	LYI/ZSLY	1,328,071	12,281	6,128.7
71.	Yancheng Nanyang Airport	Yancheng	Jiangsu	YNZ/ZSYN	1,302,974	13,121	5,539.6
72.	Yiwu Airport	Yiwu	Zhejiang	YIW/ZSYW	1,294,895	10,974	6,870.8
73.	Huai'an Lianshui Airport	Huai'an	Jiangsu	HIA/ZSSH	1,286,369	15,385	5,006.7
74.	Korla Airport	Korla	Xinjiang	KRL/ZWKL	1,279,829	11,738	7,314.1
75.	Ganzhou Huangjin Airport	Ganzhou	Jiangxi	KOW/ZSGZ	1,279,798	16,787	6,628.8
76.	Aksu Onsu Airport	Aksu	Xinjiang	AKU/ZWAK	1,276,512	10,805	6,109.1
77.	Chifeng Yulong Airport	Chifeng	Inner Mongolia	CIF/ZBCF	1,209,514	13,563	1,840.9
78.	Yining Airport	Yining	Xinjiang	YIN/ZWYN	1,151,337	10,462	4,567.9
79.	Liuzhou Bailian Airport	Liuzhou	Guangxi	LZH/ZGZH	1,136,021	11,323	5,906.1
80.	Bijie Feixiong Airport	Bijie	Guizhou	BFJ/ZUBJ	1,110,613	13,708	1,046.1
81.	Lianyungang Baitabu Airport	Lianyungang	Jiangsu	LYG/ZSLG	1,092,924	11,232	1,663.1
82.	Hotan Airport	Hotan	Xinjiang	HTN/ZWTN	1,030,691	8,635	2,261.8
83.	Xiangyang Liuji Airport	Xiangyang	Hubei	XFN/ZHXF	1,027,010	89,270	2,914.7
84.	Zhoushan Putuoshan Airport	Zhoushan	Zhejiang	HSN/ZSZS	1,023,039	22,395	196.8
85.	Tengchong Tuofeng Airport	Tengchong	Yunnan	TCZ/ZUTC	997,372	9,001	2,389.1
86.	Jining Qufu Airport	Jining	Shandong	JNG/ZSJG	970,860	8,122	2,247.3
87.	Huizhou Pingtan Airport	Huizhou	Guangdong	HUZ/ZGHZ	959,858	8,670	3,985.9
88.	Tongliao Airport	Tongliao	Inner Mongolia	TGO/ZBTL	924,759	34,733	1,693.0
89.	Xingyi Wanfenglin Airport	Xingyi	Guizhou	ACX/ZUYI	922,070	10,653	891.0
90.	Luoyang Beijiao Airport	Luoyang	Henan	LYA/ZHLY	880,253	184,810	1,463.8
91.	Shiyan Wudangshan Airport	Shiyan	Hubei	WDS/ZHSY	869,780	9,905	0.0
92.	Yibin Caiba Airport	Yibin	Sichuan	YBP/ZUYB	827,867	8,201	2,490.9
93.	Taizhou Luqiao Airport	Taizhou	Zhejiang	HYN/ZSLQ	821,965	6,454	6,841.7
94.	Mudanjiang Hailang Airport	Mudanjiang	Heilongjiang	MDG/ZYMD	784,991	6,122	986.5
95.	Nanyang Jiangying Airport	Nanyang	Henan	NNY/ZHNY	781,563	57,600	962.4
96.	Enshi Xujiaping Airport	Enshi	Hubei	ENH/ZHES	770,053	20,027	1,202.0
97.	Nanchong Gaoping Airport	Nanchong	Sichuan	NAO/ZUNC	752,668	47,904	2,913.8
98.	Rizhao Shanzihe Airport	Rizhao	Shandong	RIZ/ZSRZ	737,741	43,383	1,026.8
99.	Huangshan Tunxi International Airport	Huangshan	Anhui	TXN/ZSTX	725,948	8,063	2,291.1
100.	Handan Airport	Handan	Hebei	HDG/ZBHD	684,081	45,328	703.4

=== 2016 final statistics ===
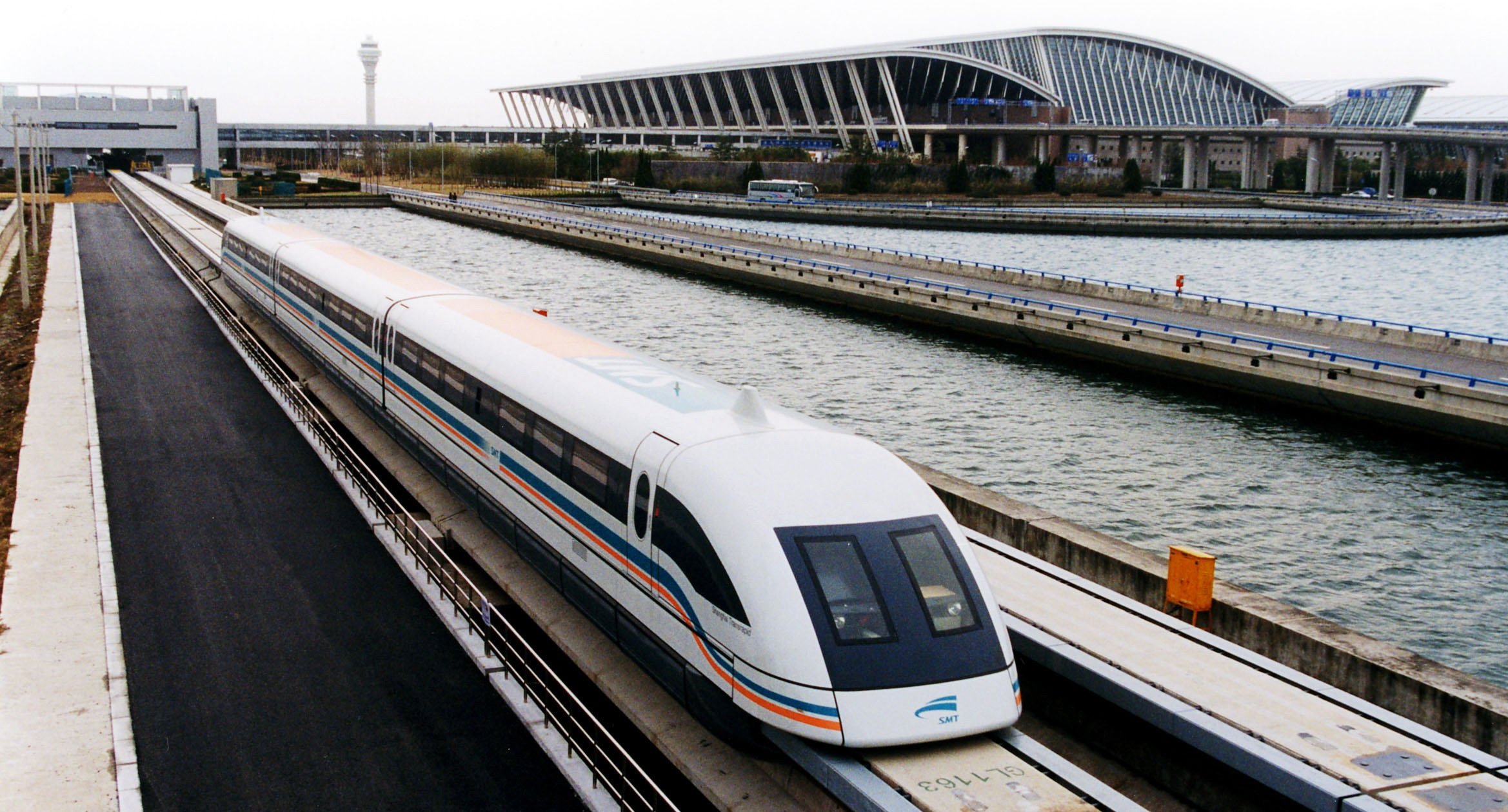
Shanghai Pudong International Airport is currently China's busiest and the world's third busiest airport by cargo traffic. It is also the country's second busiest airport by passenger traffic, reaching the world's top ten airports in this category for the first time in 2016.

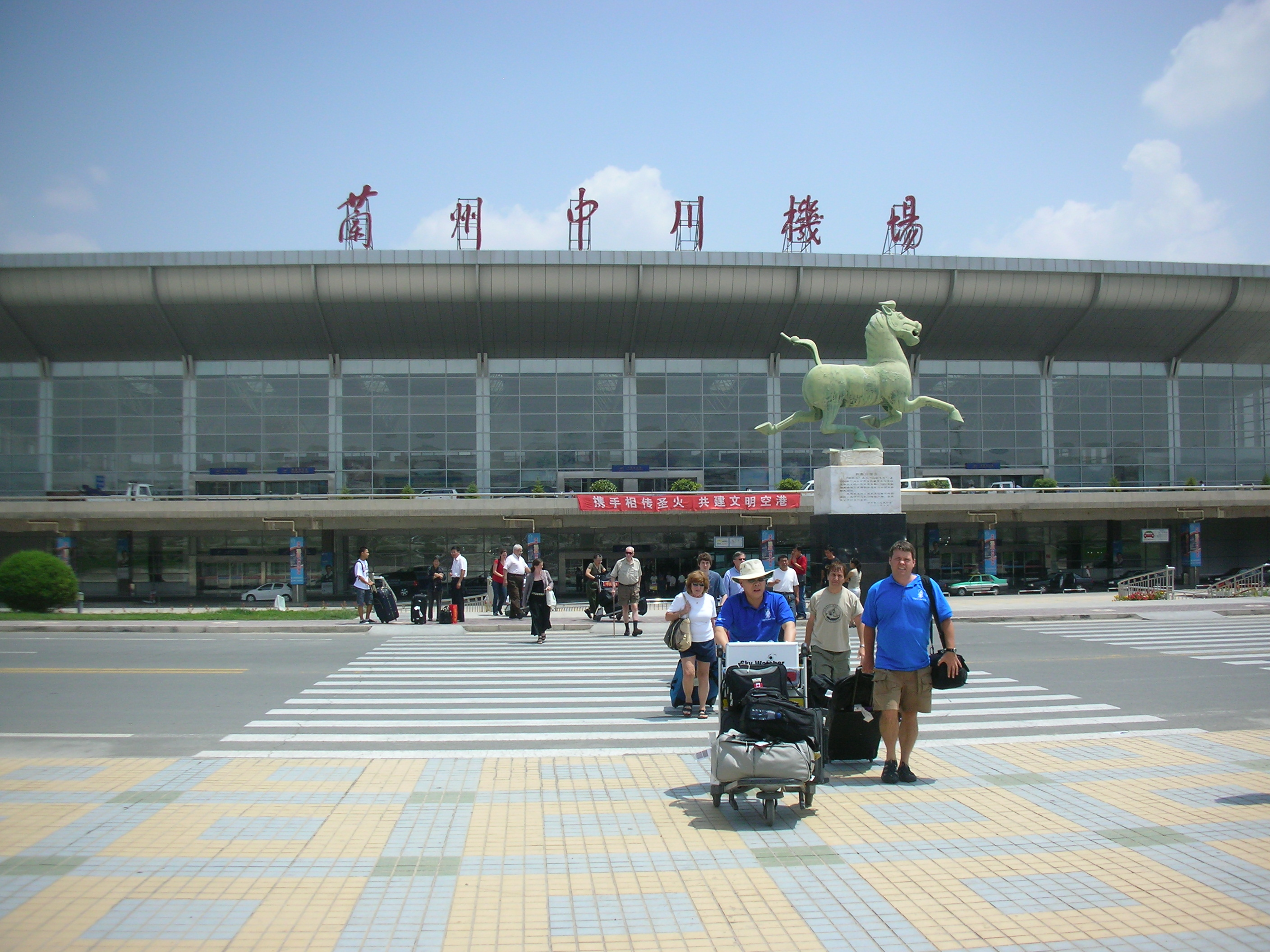
Lanzhou Zhongchuan International Airport was the fastest growing airport among the country's top 30 airports in 2016

The 100 busiest airports in China in 2016 ordered by total passenger traffic, according to the CAAC report.

Rank	Airport	City served	Division	IATA/ ICAO	Passengers	Aircraft	Cargo
1.	Beijing Capital International Airport	Beijing	Beijing	PEK/ZBAA	94,393,414	606,081	1,943,159.7
2.	Shanghai Pudong International Airport	Shanghai	Shanghai	PVG/ZSPD	66,002,414	479,902	3,440,279.7
3.	Guangzhou Baiyun International Airport	Guangzhou	Guangdong	CAN/ZGGG	59,732,147	435,231	1,652,214.9
4.	Chengdu Shuangliu International Airport	Chengdu	Sichuan	CTU/ZUUU	46,039,037	319,382	611,590.7
5.	Kunming Changshui International Airport	Kunming	Yunnan	KMG/ZPPP	41,980,339	325,934	382,854.3
6.	Shenzhen Bao'an International Airport	Shenzhen	Guangdong	SZX/ZGSZ	41,975,090	318,582	1,125,984.6
7.	Shanghai Hongqiao International Airport	Shanghai	Shanghai	SHA/ZSSS	40,460,135	261,981	428,907.5
8.	Xi'an Xianyang International Airport	Xi'an, Xianyang	Shaanxi	XIY/ZLXY	36,994,506	291,027	233,779.0
9.	Chongqing Jiangbei International Airport	Chongqing	Chongqing	CKG/ZUCK	35,888,819	276,807	361,091.0
10.	Hangzhou Xiaoshan International Airport	Hangzhou	Zhejiang	HGH/ZSHC	31,594,959	251,048	487,984.2
11.	Xiamen Gaoqi International Airport	Xiamen	Fujian	XMN/ZSAM	22,737,610	183,546	328,419.5
12.	Nanjing Lukou International Airport	Nanjing	Jiangsu	NKG/ZSNJ	22,357,998	187,968	341,267.1
13.	Changsha Huanghua International Airport	Changsha	Hunan	CSX/ZGHA	21,296,675	167,910	130,276.1
14.	Wuhan Tianhe International Airport	Wuhan	Hubei	WUH/ZHHH	20,771,564	175,669	175,294.8
15.	Zhengzhou Xinzheng International Airport	Zhengzhou	Henan	CGO/ZHCC	20,763,217	178,054	456,708.8
16.	Qingdao Liuting International Airport	Qingdao	Shandong	TAO/ZSQD	20,505,038	168,537	230,747.8
17.	Ürümqi Diwopu International Airport	Ürümqi	Xinjiang	URC/ZWWW	20,200,767	162,265	157,508.7
18.	Haikou Meilan International Airport	Haikou	Hainan	HAK/ZJHK	18,803,848	135,523	148,841.2
19.	Sanya Phoenix International Airport	Sanya	Hainan	SYX/ZJSY	17,369,550	114,581	86,846.8
20.	Tianjin Binhai International Airport	Tianjin	Tianjin	TSN/ZBTJ	16,871,889	143,822	237,085.2
21.	Harbin Taiping International Airport	Harbin	Heilongjiang	HRB/ZYHB	16,267,130	122,282	124,794.7
22.	Dalian Zhoushuizi International Airport	Dalian	Liaoning	DLC/ZYTL	15,258,209	127,680	149,008.0
23.	Guiyang Longdongbao International Airport	Guiyang	Guizhou	KWE/ZUGY	15,105,225	129,001	95,898.6
24.	Shenyang Taoxian International Airport	Shenyang	Liaoning	SHE/ZYTX	14,967,228	115,164	155,769.4
25.	Jinan Yaoqiang International Airport	Jinan	Shandong	TNA/ZSJN	11,616,914	100,152	100,013.2
26.	Fuzhou Changle International Airport	Fuzhou	Fujian	FOC/ZSFZ	11,606,446	97,606	121,657.5
27.	Nanning Wuxu International Airport	Nanning	Guangxi	NNG/ZGNN	11,559,860	94,065	104,618.1
28.	Lanzhou Zhongchuan International Airport	Lanzhou	Gansu	LHW/ZLLL	10,897,025	91,091	59,455.2
29.	Taiyuan Wusu International Airport	Taiyuan, Jinzhong	Shanxi	TYN/ZBYN	9,847,840	82,641	49,103.8
30.	Changchun Longjia International Airport	Changchun	Jilin	CGQ/ZYCC	9,493,351	73,371	86,554.1
31.	Wenzhou Longwan International Airport	Wenzhou	Zhejiang	WNZ/ZSWZ	8,189,717	67,916	77,747.7
32.	Hohhot Baita International Airport	Hohhot	Inner Mongolia	HET/ZBHH	8,185,210	81,873	37,446.1
33.	Nanchang Changbei International Airport	Nanchang	Jiangxi	KHN/ZSCN	7,863,635	66,409	50,607.7
34.	Ningbo Lishe International Airport	Ningbo	Zhejiang	NGB/ZSNB	7,792,305	63,663	107,019.7
35.	Hefei Xinqiao International Airport	Hefei	Anhui	HFE/ZSOF	7,391,998	63,750	58,096.7
36.	Shijiazhuang Zhengding International Airport	Shijiazhuang	Hebei	SJW/ZBSJ	7,214,590	68,687	43,765.2
37.	Lijiang Sanyi Airport	Lijiang	Yunnan	LJG/ZPLJ	6,784,474	53,170	9,299.2
38.	Guilin Liangjiang International Airport	Guilin	Guangxi	KWL/ZGKL	6,630,251	57,387	26,413.9
39.	Yinchuan Hedong International Airport	Yinchuan	Ningxia	INC/ZLIC	6,341,479	53,921	37,106.6
40.	Zhuhai Jinwan Airport	Zhuhai	Guangdong	ZUH/ZGSD	6,130,384	61,400	31,511.6
41.	Beijing Nanyuan Airport	Beijing	Beijing	NAY/ZBNY	5,586,388	39,507	26,634.5
42.	Sunan Shuofang International Airport	Wuxi, Suzhou	Jiangsu	WUX/ZSWX	5,561,927	45,679	95,983.7
43.	Yantai Penglai International Airport	Yantai	Shandong	YNT/ZSYT	5,135,200	50,962	43,055.3
44.	Xining Caojiabao Airport	Xining, Haidong	Qinghai	XNN/ZLXN	4,681,138	40,873	24,435.2
45.	Xishuangbanna Gasa Airport	Jinghong	Yunnan	JHG/ZPJH	4,335,339	35,034	10,904.1
46.	Jieyang Chaoshan Airport	Jieyang, Chaozhou, Shantou	Guangdong	SWA/ZGOW	3,818,152	42,684	25,243.2
47.	Quanzhou Jinjiang International Airport	Quanzhou	Fujian	JJN/ZSQZ	3,793,150	33,787	49,683.4
48.	Lhasa Gonggar Airport	Lhasa, Shannan	Tibet	LXA/ZULS	3,339,429	31,054	27,686.8
49.	Mianyang Nanjiao Airport	Mianyang	Sichuan	MIG/ZUMY	2,172,922	190,062	6,465.3
50.	Changzhou Benniu Airport	Changzhou	Jiangsu	CZX/ZSCG	1,955,844	26,121	15,690.4
51.	Hulunbuir Hailar Airport	Hailar	Inner Mongolia	HLD/ZBLA	1,878,901	16,443	7,265.2
52.	Baotou Erliban Airport	Baotou	Inner Mongolia	BAV/ZBOW	1,867,690	17,478	9,409.5
53.	Kashgar Airport	Kashgar	Xinjiang	KHG/ZWSH	1,815,091	19,524	6,553.6
54.	Weihai Dashuibo Airport	Weihai	Shandong	WEH/ZSWH	1,735,309	15,263	5,255.8
55.	Ordos Ejin Horo Airport	Ordos	Inner Mongolia	DSN/ZBDS	1,706,356	44,162	9,115.1
56.	Zhangjiajie Hehua Airport	Zhangjiajie	Hunan	DYG/ZGDY	1,701,712	16,939	1,014.4
57.	Nantong Xingdong Airport	Nantong	Jiangsu	NTG/ZSNT	1,538,158	21,281	35,371.1
58.	Dehong Mangshi Airport	Mangshi	Yunnan	LUM/ZPLX	1,537,536	12,726	6,857.7
59.	Yichang Sanxia Airport	Yichang	Hubei	YIH/ZHYC	1,535,707	41,504	3,806.8
60.	Yulin Yuyang Airport	Yulin	Shaanxi	UYN/ZLYL	1,513,793	15,551	3,709.2
61.	Zhanjiang Airport	Zhanjiang	Guangdong	ZHA/ZGZJ	1,503,904	18,970	4,238.5
62.	Xuzhou Guanyin Airport	Xuzhou	Jiangsu	XUZ/ZSXZ	1,487,086	29,470	9,088.1
63.	Yanji Chaoyangchuan Airport	Yanji	Jilin	YNJ/ZYYJ	1,481,159	12,899	7,237.0
64.	Yangzhou Taizhou Airport	Yangzhou, Taizhou	Jiangsu	YTY/ZSYA	1,434,193	38,080	8,225.5
65.	Dali Huangcaoba Airport	Dali	Yunnan	DLU/ZPDL	1,431,116	13,130	4,123.4
66.	Beihai Fucheng Airport	Beihai	Guangxi	BHY/ZGBH	1,234,031	14,868	4,654.5
67.	Yiwu Airport	Yiwu	Zhejiang	YIW/ZSYW	1,226,697	11,302	5,913.9
68.	Yancheng Nanyang Airport	Yancheng	Jiangsu	YNZ/ZSYN	1,209,004	12,402	5,118.0
69.	Linyi Shubuling Airport	Linyi	Shandong	LYI/ZSLY	1,203,387	12,079	5,129.0
70.	Korla Airport	Korla	Xinjiang	KRL/ZWKL	1,147,634	10,574	6,118.3
71.	Zunyi Xinzhou Airport	Zunyi	Guizhou	ZYI/ZUZY	1,135,432	11,856	976.6
72.	Jiuzhai Huanglong Airport	Jiuzhaigou	Sichuan	JZH/ZUJZ	1,122,223	10,139	137.8
73.	Aksu Onsu Airport	Aksu	Xinjiang	AKU/ZWAK	1,103,589	10,052	5,170.5
74.	Ganzhou Huangjin Airport	Ganzhou	Jiangxi	KOW/ZSGZ	1,083,240	15,269	7,306.6
75.	Chifeng Yulong Airport	Chifeng	Inner Mongolia	CIF/ZBCF	1,042,682	12,748	1,640.2
76.	Yining Airport	Yining	Xinjiang	YIN/ZWYN	1,041,470	9,673	3,904.3
77.	Liuzhou Bailian Airport	Liuzhou	Guangxi	LZH/ZGZH	1,036,219	11,393	5,409.8
78.	Luzhou Lantian Airport	Luzhou	Sichuan	LZO/ZULZ	985,108	9,992	3,293.1
79.	Hotan Airport	Hotan	Xinjiang	HTN/ZWTN	935,314	7,714	1,585.3
80.	Luoyang Beijiao Airport	Luoyang	Henan	LYA/ZHLY	915,971	176,630	1,486.2
81.	Huai'an Lianshui Airport	Huai'an	Jiangsu	HIA/ZSSH	861,533	23,215	4,637.5
82.	Lianyungang Baitabu Airport	Lianyungang	Jiangsu	LYG/ZSLG	850,972	9,322	1,245.0
83.	Yuncheng Zhangxiao Airport	Yuncheng	Shanxi	YCU/ZBYC	843,226	16,634	3,200.0
84.	Xiangyang Liuji Airport	Xiangyang	Hubei	XFN/ZHXF	824,160	83,261	2,510.8
85.	Tengchong Tuofeng Airport	Tengchong	Yunnan	TCZ/ZUTC	805,638	7,144	1,443.8
86.	Zhoushan Putuoshan Airport	Zhoushan	Zhejiang	HSN/ZSZS	800,877	21,359	319.1
87.	Yibin Caiba Airport	Yibin	Sichuan	YBP/ZUYB	762,935	7,925	2,919.9
88.	Changzhi Wangcun Airport	Changzhi	Shanxi	CIH/ZBCZ	741,573	9,175	718.6
89.	Bijie Feixiong Airport	Bijie	Guizhou	BFJ/ZUBJ	733,605	10,455	432.9
90.	Tongliao Airport	Tongliao	Inner Mongolia	TGO/ZBTL	710,474	11,846	1,471.9
91.	Mudanjiang Hailang Airport	Mudanjiang	Heilongjiang	MDG/ZYMD	694,286	5,534	1,162.3
92.	Taizhou Luqiao Airport	Taizhou	Zhejiang	HYN/ZSLQ	691,442	5,658	6,719.5
93.	Jining Qufu Airport	Jining	Shandong	JNG/ZSJG	623,948	5,794	1,813.5
94.	Nanyang Jiangying Airport	Nanyang	Henan	NNY/ZHNY	612,572	48,272	797.4
95.	Huangshan Tunxi International Airport	Huangshan	Anhui	TXN/ZSTX	604,911	6,575	2,067.0
96.	Nanchong Gaoping Airport	Nanchong	Sichuan	NAO/ZUNC	597,489	18,542	3,107.1
97.	Xilinhot Airport	Xilinhot	Inner Mongolia	XIL/ZBXH	582,194	21,016	2,015.9
98.	Tongren Fenghuang Airport	Tongren	Guizhou	TEN/ZUTR	577,645	11,060	54.6
99.	Ulanhot Airport	Ulanhot	Inner Mongolia	HLH/ZBUL	573,856	12,261	2,067.8
100.	Wanzhou Wuqiao Airport	Wanzhou	Chongqing	WXN/ZUWX	550,727	17,438	2,247.4

=== 2015 final statistics ===
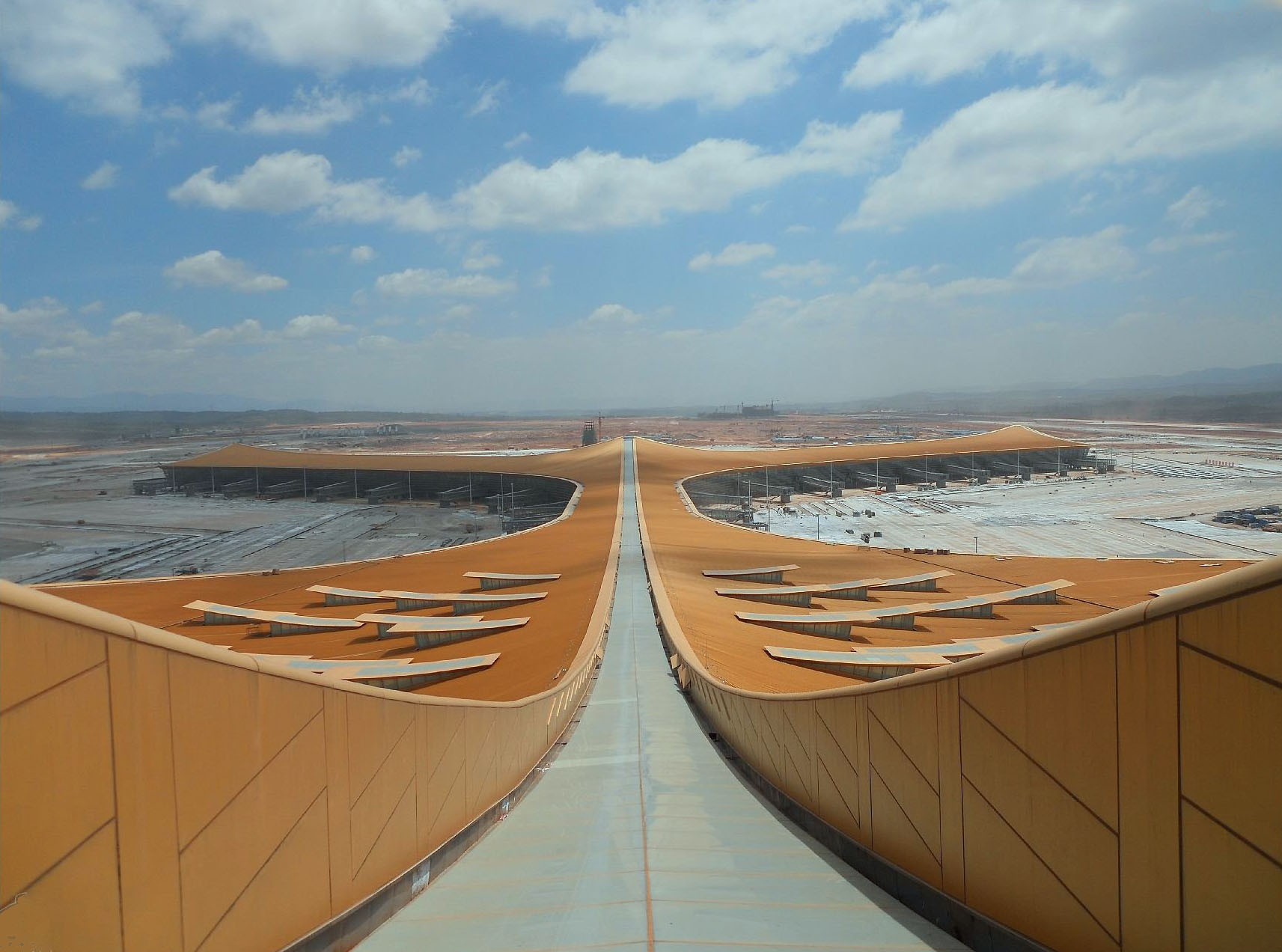
Kunming Changshui International Airport, opened on June 28, 2012, has replaced Wujiaba Airport, and since then it has been growing steady. The airport reached the world's top 50 busiest airports by passenger traffic in 2015 for the first time.

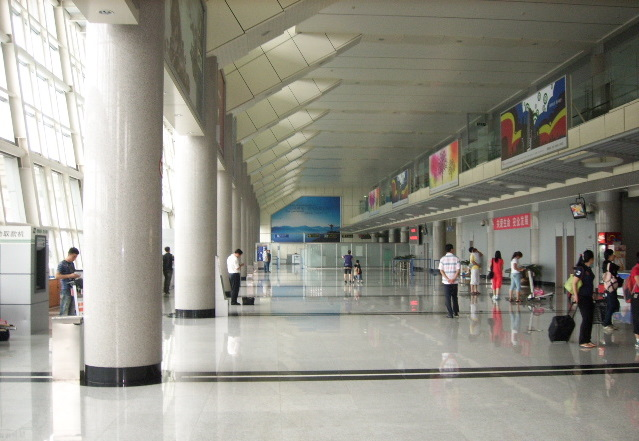
The best performance between China's top 100 airports in 2015 was Weihai Dashuibo Airport, more than doubling their numbers of passengers and aircraft traffic since 2014.

The 100 busiest airports in China in 2015 ordered by total passenger traffic, according to the CAAC report.

Rank	Airport	City served	Division	IATA/ ICAO	Passengers	Aircraft	Cargo
1.	Beijing Capital International Airport	Beijing	Beijing	PEK/ZBAA	89,939,049	590,199	1,889,439.5
2.	Shanghai Pudong International Airport	Shanghai	Shanghai	PVG/ZSPD	60,098,073	449,171	3,275,231.1
3.	Guangzhou Baiyun International Airport	Guangzhou	Guangdong	CAN/ZGGG	55,201,915	409,679	1,537,758.9
4.	Chengdu Shuangliu International Airport	Chengdu	Sichuan	CTU/ZUUU	42,239,468	293,643	556,552.1
5.	Shenzhen Bao'an International Airport	Shenzhen	Guangdong	SZX/ZGSZ	39,721,619	305,461	1,013,690.5
6.	Shanghai Hongqiao International Airport	Shanghai	Shanghai	SHA/ZSSS	39,090,865	256,603	433,600.1
7.	Kunming Changshui International Airport	Kunming	Yunnan	KMG/ZPPP	37,523,098	300,406	355,422.8
8.	Xi'an Xianyang International Airport	Xi'an, Xianyang	Shaanxi	XIY/ZLXY	32,970,215	267,102	211,591.5
9.	Chongqing Jiangbei International Airport	Chongqing	Chongqing	CKG/ZUCK	32,402,096	255,414	318,781.5
10.	Hangzhou Xiaoshan International Airport	Hangzhou	Zhejiang	HGH/ZSHC	28,354,435	232,079	424,932.7
11.	Xiamen Gaoqi International Airport	Xiamen	Fujian	XMN/ZSAM	21,814,244	180,112	310,606.6
12.	Nanjing Lukou International Airport	Nanjing	Jiangsu	NKG/ZSNJ	19,163,768	166,858	326,026.5
13.	Wuhan Tianhe International Airport	Wuhan	Hubei	WUH/ZHHH	18,942,038	164,524	154,656.2
14.	Changsha Huanghua International Airport	Changsha	Hunan	CSX/ZGHA	18,715,278	153,367	122,022.1
15.	Ürümqi Diwopu International Airport	Ürümqi	Xinjiang	URC/ZWWW	18,506,463	153,097	156,469.8
16.	Qingdao Liuting International Airport	Qingdao	Shandong	TAO/ZSQD	18,202,085	155,483	208,064.0
17.	Zhengzhou Xinzheng International Airport	Zhengzhou	Henan	CGO/ZHCC	17,297,385	154,468	403,339.0
18.	Sanya Phoenix International Airport	Sanya	Hainan	SYX/ZJSY	16,191,930	108,532	85,369.3
19.	Haikou Meilan International Airport	Haikou	Hainan	HAK/ZJHK	16,167,004	121,825	135,944.6
20.	Tianjin Binhai International Airport	Tianjin	Tianjin	TSN/ZBTJ	14,314,322	125,693	217,279.2
21.	Dalian Zhoushuizi International Airport	Dalian	Liaoning	DLC/ZYTL	14,154,130	117,794	137,048.1
22.	Harbin Taiping International Airport	Harbin	Heilongjiang	HRB/ZYHB	14,054,357	108,428	116,103.8
23.	Guiyang Longdongbao International Airport	Guiyang	Guizhou	KWE/ZUGY	13,244,982	116,914	87,207.0
24.	Shenyang Taoxian International Airport	Shenyang	Liaoning	SHE/ZYTX	12,680,118	99,563	142,069.6
25.	Fuzhou Changle International Airport	Fuzhou	Fujian	FOC/ZSFZ	10,887,292	96,127	116,497.5
26.	Nanning Wuxu International Airport	Nanning	Guangxi	NNG/ZGNN	10,393,728	86,873	95,710.3
27.	Jinan Yaoqiang International Airport	Jinan	Shandong	TNA/ZSJN	9,520,887	86,158	86,336.8
28.	Taiyuan Wusu International Airport	Taiyuan, Jinzhong	Shanxi	TYN/ZBYN	8,842,987	79,376	45,463.6
29.	Changchun Longjia International Airport	Changchun	Jilin	CGQ/ZYCC	8,556,182	67,763	77,793.9
30.	Lanzhou Zhongchuan International Airport	Lanzhou	Gansu	LHW/ZLLL	8,009,040	67,835	50,093.8
31.	Nanchang Changbei International Airport	Nanchang	Jiangxi	KHN/ZSCN	7,487,930	67,304	51,080.5
32.	Hohhot Baita International Airport	Hohhot	Inner Mongolia	HET/ZBHH	7,446,250	74,509	36,077.8
33.	Wenzhou Longwan International Airport	Wenzhou	Zhejiang	WNZ/ZSWZ	7,360,467	61,750	72,638.1
34.	Ningbo Lishe International Airport	Ningbo	Zhejiang	NGB/ZSNB	6,855,075	56,110	77,054.2
35.	Hefei Xinqiao International Airport	Hefei	Anhui	HFE/ZSOF	6,613,111	57,294	51,291.1
36.	Guilin Liangjiang International Airport	Guilin	Guangxi	KWL/ZGKL	6,361,045	54,089	29,519.5
37.	Shijiazhuang Zhengding International Airport	Shijiazhuang	Hebei	SJW/ZBSJ	5,985,389	56,728	44,693.9
38.	Lijiang Sanyi Airport	Lijiang	Yunnan	LJG/ZPLJ	5,626,307	45,938	8,291.1
39.	Yinchuan Hedong International Airport	Yinchuan	Ningxia	INC/ZLIC	5,389,908	47,058	33,326.1
40.	Beijing Nanyuan Airport	Beijing	Beijing	NAY/ZBNY	5,265,201	42,129	36,755.6
41.	Zhuhai Jinwan Airport	Zhuhai	Guangdong	ZUH/ZGSD	4,708,706	50,478	25,828.1
42.	Sunan Shuofang International Airport	Wuxi, Suzhou	Jiangsu	WUX/ZSWX	4,609,344	38,569	89,060.0
43.	Yantai Penglai International Airport	Yantai	Shandong	YNT/ZSYT	4,246,581	44,424	36,310.8
44.	Xishuangbanna Gasa Airport	Jinghong	Yunnan	JHG/ZPJH	4,150,734	34,512	7,875.2
45.	Xining Caojiabao Airport	Xining, Haidong	Qinghai	XNN/ZLXN	4,005,667	34,668	21,657.2
46.	Quanzhou Jinjiang International Airport	Quanzhou	Fujian	JJN/ZSQZ	3,635,607	32,687	43,033.3
47.	Jieyang Chaoshan Airport	Jieyang, Chaozhou, Shantou	Guangdong	SWA/ZGOW	3,204,464	38,937	19,779.9
48.	Lhasa Gonggar Airport	Lhasa, Shannan	Tibet	LXA/ZULS	2,908,416	27,758	25,378.3
49.	Baotou Erliban Airport	Baotou	Inner Mongolia	BAV/ZBOW	1,901,035	17,954	10,758.4
50.	Hulunbuir Hailar Airport	Hailar	Inner Mongolia	HLD/ZBLA	1,835,915	17,178	7,187.9
51.	Changzhou Benniu Airport	Changzhou	Jiangsu	CZX/ZSCG	1,810,842	26,347	17,619.7
52.	Kashgar Airport	Kashgar	Xinjiang	KHG/ZWSH	1,732,958	14,056	6,657.3
53.	Mianyang Nanjiao Airport	Mianyang	Sichuan	MIG/ZUMY	1,547,533	199,050	5,312.8
54.	Ordos Ejin Horo Airport	Ordos	Inner Mongolia	DSN/ZBDS	1,522,697	31,002	10,588.6
55.	Yulin Yuyang Airport	Yulin	Shaanxi	UYN/ZLYL	1,483,089	16,159	3,414.7
56.	Yanji Chaoyangchuan Airport	Yanji	Jilin	YNJ/ZYYJ	1,458,440	12,585	6,731.7
57.	Jiuzhai Huanglong Airport	Jiuzhaigou	Sichuan	JZH/ZUJZ	1,416,980	12,898	232.9
58.	Zhangjiajie Hehua Airport	Zhangjiajie	Hunan	DYG/ZGDY	1,405,465	14,087	914.2
59.	Dehong Mangshi Airport	Mangshi	Yunnan	LUM/ZPLX	1,323,465	11,230	7,778.8
60.	Weihai Dashuibo Airport	Weihai	Shandong	WEH/ZSWH	1,320,989	12,622	5,251.1
61.	Xuzhou Guanyin Airport	Xuzhou	Jiangsu	XUZ/ZSXZ	1,318,477	31,789	7,039.4
62.	Dali Huangcaoba Airport	Dali	Yunnan	DLU/ZPDL	1,262,486	12,156	2,796.3
63.	Yichang Sanxia Airport	Yichang	Hubei	YIH/ZHYC	1,244,275	41,836	3,608.7
64.	Zhanjiang Airport	Zhanjiang	Guangdong	ZHA/ZGZJ	1,206,811	16,655	4,169.0
65.	Yiwu Airport	Yiwu	Zhejiang	YIW/ZSYW	1,196,477	11,272	5,380.2
66.	Korla Airport	Korla	Xinjiang	KRL/ZWKL	1,179,185	11,001	5,556.2
67.	Nantong Xingdong Airport	Nantong	Jiangsu	NTG/ZSNT	1,161,819	22,537	31,345.3
68.	Beihai Fucheng Airport	Beihai	Guangxi	BHY/ZGBH	1,078,148	11,996	4,103.3
69.	Aksu Onsu Airport	Aksu	Xinjiang	AKU/ZWAK	1,067,009	10,244	3,546.5
70.	Linyi Shubuling Airport	Linyi	Shandong	LYI/ZSLY	1,038,437	10,617	4,753.6
71.	Chifeng Yulong Airport	Chifeng	Inner Mongolia	CIF/ZBCF	987,024	11,901	2,588.8
72.	Yining Airport	Yining	Xinjiang	YIN/ZWYN	964,446	9,183	2,944.2
73.	Ganzhou Huangjin Airport	Ganzhou	Jiangxi	KOW/ZSGZ	925,101	13,928	6,058.7
74.	Yangzhou Taizhou Airport	Yangzhou, Taizhou	Jiangsu	YTY/ZSYA	870,775	30,614	6,169.9
75.	Tongliao Airport	Tongliao	Inner Mongolia	TGO/ZBTL	869,550	10,626	3,394.9
76.	Liuzhou Bailian Airport	Liuzhou	Guangxi	LZH/ZGZH	868,802	9,879	4,243.6
77.	Yancheng Nanyang Airport	Yancheng	Jiangsu	YNZ/ZSYN	851,990	8,842	3,005.7
78.	Luzhou Lantian Airport	Luzhou	Sichuan	LZO/ZULZ	844,624	8,932	2,868.2
79.	Zunyi Xinzhou Airport	Zunyi	Guizhou	ZYI/ZUZY	836,614	8,969	175.9
80.	Yuncheng Zhangxiao Airport	Yuncheng	Shanxi	YCU/ZBYC	814,469	12,606	2,439.1
81.	Xiangyang Liuji Airport	Xiangyang	Hubei	XFN/ZHXF	793,425	69,936	2,378.9
82.	Luoyang Beijiao Airport	Luoyang	Henan	LYA/ZHLY	721,665	196,572	1,510.2
83.	Hotan Airport	Hotan	Xinjiang	HTN/ZWTN	719,831	6,176	1,175.0
84.	Yibin Caiba Airport	Yibin	Sichuan	YBP/ZUYB	715,973	7,624	2,881.0
85.	Lianyungang Baitabu Airport	Lianyungang	Jiangsu	LYG/ZSLG	708,963	7,802	1,435.7
86.	Tengchong Tuofeng Airport	Tengchong	Yunnan	TCZ/ZUTC	664,448	6,930	1,008.6
87.	Mudanjiang Hailang Airport	Mudanjiang	Heilongjiang	MDG/ZYMD	650,991	5,568	1,501.5
88.	Zhoushan Putuoshan Airport	Zhoushan	Zhejiang	HSN/ZSZS	644,719	20,527	319.7
89.	Changzhi Wangcun Airport	Changzhi	Shanxi	CIH/ZBCZ	617,888	7,218	636.4
90.	Huangshan Tunxi International Airport	Huangshan	Anhui	TXN/ZSTX	591,281	6,454	2,101.7
91.	Taizhou Luqiao Airport	Taizhou	Zhejiang	HYN/ZSLQ	584,708	4,708	5,985.1
92.	Nanyang Jiangying Airport	Nanyang	Henan	NNY/ZHNY	567,002	38,161	912.8
93.	Bijie Feixiong Airport	Bijie	Guizhou	BFJ/ZUBJ	563,861	8,483	814.4
94.	Wanzhou Wuqiao Airport	Wanzhou	Chongqing	WXN/ZUWX	553,381	8,368	2,475.4
95.	Nanchong Gaoping Airport	Nanchong	Sichuan	NAO/ZUNC	549,802	18,128	2,964.2
96.	Daqing Sartu Airport	Daqing	Heilongjiang	DQA/ZYDQ	532,379	4,790	1,725.0
97.	Jinggangshan Airport	Ji'an	Jiangxi	JGS/ZSJA	514,175	5,842	3,006.2
98.	Huai'an Lianshui Airport	Huai'an	Jiangsu	HIA/ZSSH	504,753	10,048	3,754.3
99.	Diqing Shangri-La Airport	Shangri-La	Yunnan	DIG/ZPDQ	503,800	5,204	839.9
100.	Changbaishan Airport	Baishan	Jilin	NBS/ZYBS	503,598	4,766	81.3

=== 2014 final statistics ===
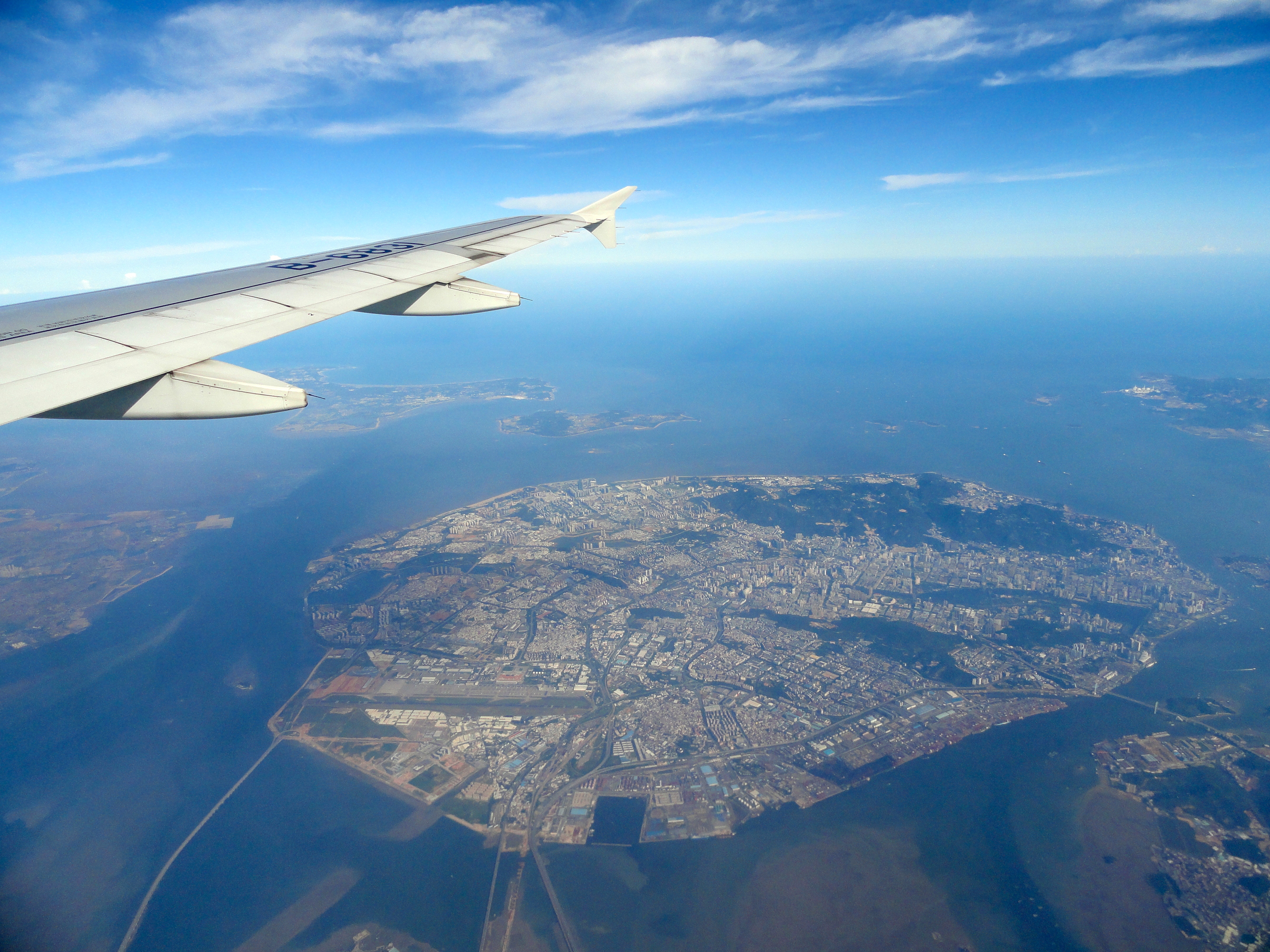
As of 2014 there are 11 airports with more than 20 million passengers yearly. Xiamen Gaoqi International Airport was the most recent airport to achieve this goal that year.

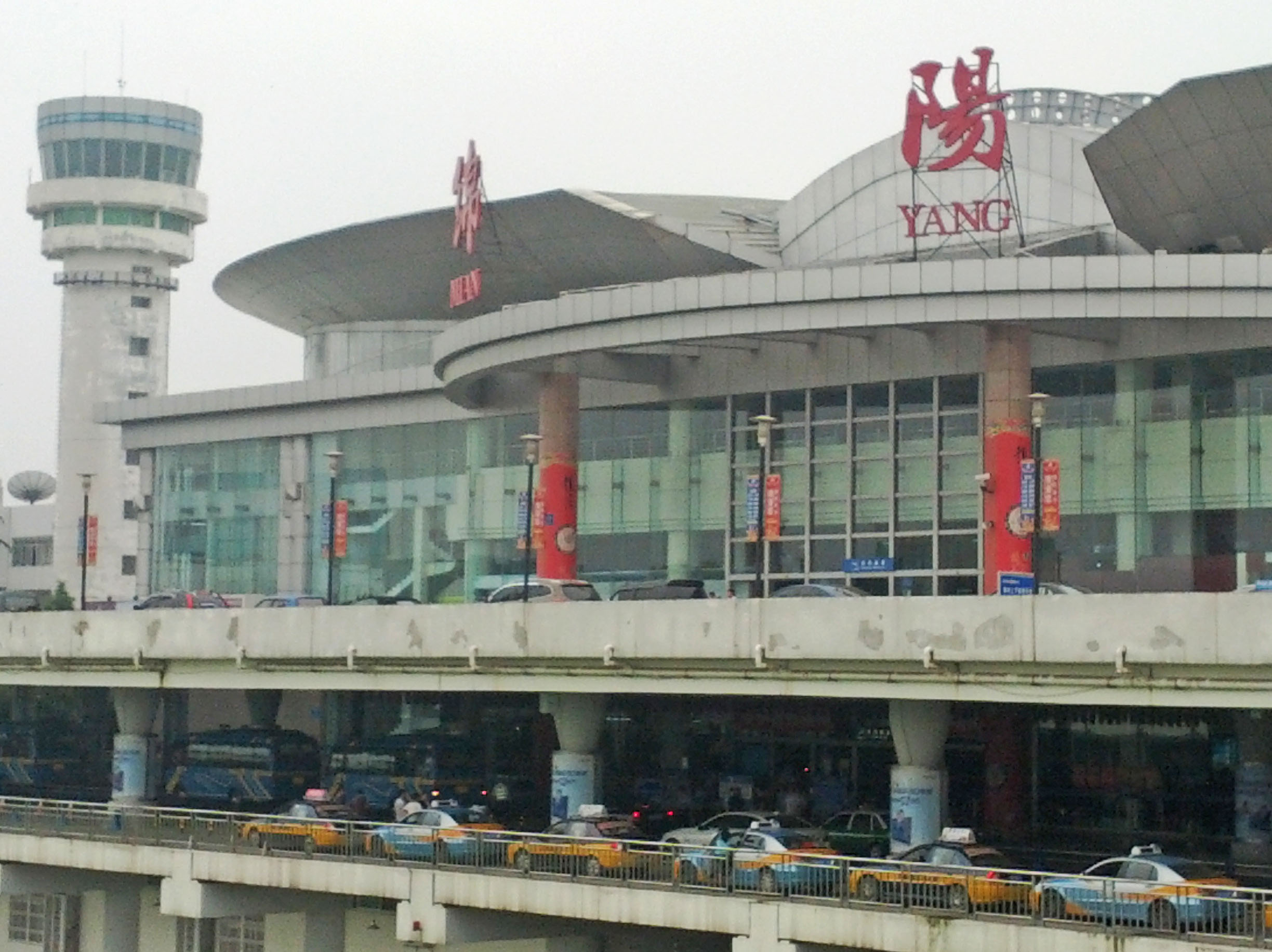
Mianyang Nanjiao Airport is not between China's top 50 busiest airports by passengers nor freight, but is one of the country's top 10 busiest airports by aircraft movements, reaching a record high in 2014.

The 100 busiest airports in China in 2014 ordered by total passenger traffic, according to the CAAC report.

Rank	Airport	City served	Division	IATA/ ICAO	Passengers	Aircraft	Cargo
1.	Beijing Capital International Airport	Beijing	Beijing	PEK/ZBAA	86,128,313	581,952	1,848,251.5
2.	Guangzhou Baiyun International Airport	Guangzhou	Guangdong	CAN/ZGGG	54,780,346	412,210	1,454,043.8
3.	Shanghai Pudong International Airport	Shanghai	Shanghai	PVG/ZSPD	51,687,894	402,105	3,181,654.1
4.	Shanghai Hongqiao International Airport	Shanghai	Shanghai	SHA/ZSSS	37,971,135	253,325	432,176.4
5.	Chengdu Shuangliu International Airport	Chengdu	Sichuan	CTU/ZUUU	37,675,232	270,054	545,011.2
6.	Shenzhen Bao'an International Airport	Shenzhen	Guangdong	SZX/ZGSZ	36,272,701	286,346	963,871.2
7.	Kunming Changshui International Airport	Kunming	Yunnan	KMG/ZPPP	32,230,883	270,529	316,672.4
8.	Chongqing Jiangbei International Airport	Chongqing	Chongqing	CKG/ZUCK	30,264,435	238,085	302,335.8
9.	Xi'an Xianyang International Airport	Xi'an, Xianyang	Shaanxi	XIY/ZLXY	29,260,755	245,971	186,412.6
10.	Hangzhou Xiaoshan International Airport	Hangzhou	Zhejiang	HGH/ZSHC	25,525,862	213,268	398,557.6
11.	Xiamen Gaoqi International Airport	Xiamen	Fujian	XMN/ZSAM	20,863,786	174,315	306,385.0
12.	Changsha Huanghua International Airport	Changsha	Hunan	CSX/ZGHA	18,020,501	152,359	125,037.8
13.	Wuhan Tianhe International Airport	Wuhan	Hubei	WUH/ZHHH	17,277,104	157,596	143,029.6
14.	Qingdao Liuting International Airport	Qingdao	Shandong	TAO/ZSQD	16,411,789	142,452	204,419.4
15.	Ürümqi Diwopu International Airport	Ürümqi	Xinjiang	URC/ZWWW	16,311,140	142,266	162,711.3
16.	Nanjing Lukou International Airport	Nanjing	Jiangsu	NKG/ZSNJ	16,283,816	144,278	304,324.8
17.	Zhengzhou Xinzheng International Airport	Zhengzhou	Henan	CGO/ZHCC	15,805,443	147,696	370,420.7
18.	Sanya Phoenix International Airport	Sanya	Hainan	SYX/ZJSY	14,942,356	102,074	75,645.8
19.	Haikou Meilan International Airport	Haikou	Hainan	HAK/ZJHK	13,853,859	105,861	121,131.4
20.	Dalian Zhoushuizi International Airport	Dalian	Liaoning	DLC/ZYTL	13,551,223	115,284	133,490.0
21.	Shenyang Taoxian International Airport	Shenyang	Liaoning	SHE/ZYTX	12,800,272	97,172	138,318.4
22.	Guiyang Longdongbao International Airport	Guiyang	Guizhou	KWE/ZUGY	12,525,537	113,424	82,063.4
23.	Harbin Taiping International Airport	Harbin	Heilongjiang	HRB/ZYHB	12,239,026	97,746	106,559.8
24.	Tianjin Binhai International Airport	Tianjin	Tianjin	TSN/ZBTJ	12,073,041	114,557	233,358.6
25.	Nanning Wuxu International Airport	Nanning	Guangxi	NNG/ZGNN	9,412,246	80,496	90,353.2
26.	Fuzhou Changle International Airport	Fuzhou	Fujian	FOC/ZSFZ	9,353,414	86,944	121,383.4
27.	Jinan Yaoqiang International Airport	Jinan	Shandong	TNA/ZSJN	8,708,950	83,551	80,503.1
28.	Taiyuan Wusu International Airport	Taiyuan, Jinzhong	Shanxi	TYN/ZBYN	7,931,902	73,211	44,863.9
29.	Changchun Longjia International Airport	Changchun	Jilin	CGQ/ZYCC	7,421,726	60,751	73,560.9
30.	Nanchang Changbei International Airport	Nanchang	Jiangxi	KHN/ZSCN	7,240,861	65,402	46,066.4
31.	Guilin Liangjiang International Airport	Guilin	Guangxi	KWL/ZGKL	6,897,741	60,804	35,841.5
32.	Wenzhou Longwan International Airport	Wenzhou	Zhejiang	WNZ/ZSWZ	6,802,179	59,135	68,828.4
33.	Lanzhou Zhongchuan Airport	Lanzhou	Gansu	ZGC/ZLLL	6,588,862	57,481	46,967.0
34.	Hohhot Baita International Airport	Hohhot	Inner Mongolia	HET/ZBHH	6,469,632	65,690	36,752.3
35.	Ningbo Lishe International Airport	Ningbo	Zhejiang	NGB/ZSNB	6,359,139	53,897	78,024.5
36.	Hefei Xinqiao International Airport	Hefei	Anhui	HFE/ZSOF	5,974,599	53,056	46,426.0
37.	Shijiazhuang Zhengding International Airport	Shijiazhuang	Hebei	SJW/ZBSJ	5,601,017	56,216	45,554.5
38.	Beijing Nanyuan Airport	Beijing	Beijing	NAY/ZBNY	4,929,241	42,638	37,249.9
39.	Lijiang Sanyi Airport	Lijiang	Yunnan	LJG/ZPLJ	4,852,284	42,710	7,037.7
40.	Yinchuan Hedong International Airport	Yinchuan	Ningxia	INC/ZLIC	4,663,809	43,025	31,132.6
41.	Yantai Laishan International Airport	Yantai	Shandong	YNT/ZSYT	4,305,822	43,091	38,603.3
42.	Sunan Shuofang International Airport	Wuxi, Suzhou	Jiangsu	WUX/ZSWX	4,180,038	35,781	96,120.4
43.	Zhuhai Jinwan Airport	Zhuhai	Guangdong	ZUH/ZGSD	4,075,918	50,939	22,128.2
44.	Xining Caojiabao Airport	Xining, Haidong	Qinghai	XNN/ZLXN	3,852,528	33,753	20,256.8
45.	Xishuangbanna Gasa Airport	Jinghong	Yunnan	JHG/ZPJH	3,360,505	30,924	6,123.7
46.	Jieyang Chaoshan Airport	Jieyang, Chaozhou, Shantou	Guangdong	SWA/ZGOW	2,870,252	34,900	18,569.3
47.	Quanzhou Jinjiang Airport	Quanzhou	Fujian	JJN/ZSQZ	2,784,207	27,105	41,232.8
48.	Lhasa Gonggar Airport	Lhasa, Shannan	Tibet	LXA/ZULS	2,563,204	24,079	22,211.1
49.	Changzhou Benniu Airport	Changzhou	Jiangsu	CZX/ZSCG	1,860,944	22,438	18,241.1
50.	Baotou Erliban Airport	Baotou	Inner Mongolia	BAV/ZBOW	1,829,990	17,105	10,139.1
51.	Jiuzhai Huanglong Airport	Jiuzhaigou	Sichuan	JZH/ZUJZ	1,702,527	15,960	890.3
52.	Ordos Ejin Horo Airport	Ordos	Inner Mongolia	DSN/ZBDS	1,503,065	29,009	6,610.4
53.	Hulunbuir Hailar Airport	Hailar	Inner Mongolia	HLD/ZBLA	1,494,499	14,597	6,135.9
54.	Kashgar Airport	Kashgar	Xinjiang	KHG/ZWSH	1,428,586	13,094	7,595.2
55.	Yulin Yuyang Airport	Yulin	Shaanxi	UYN/ZLYL	1,386,483	15,543	3,112.3
56.	Xuzhou Guanyin Airport	Xuzhou	Jiangsu	XUZ/ZSXZ	1,267,548	31,400	6,432.1
57.	Yanji Chaoyangchuan Airport	Yanji	Jilin	YNJ/ZYYJ	1,242,164	10,369	6,315.9
58.	Yiwu Airport	Yiwu	Zhejiang	YIW/ZSYW	1,204,542	10,749	5,292.0
59.	Yichang Sanxia Airport	Yichang	Hubei	YIH/ZHYC	1,127,093	40,400	4,294.0
60.	Zhangjiajie Hehua Airport	Zhangjiajie	Hunan	DYG/ZGDY	1,091,559	9,872	1,404.4
61.	Mianyang Nanjiao Airport	Mianyang	Sichuan	MIG/ZUMY	1,084,998	214,558	5,464.0
62.	Dehong Mangshi Airport	Mangshi	Yunnan	LUM/ZPLX	1,060,650	10,136	5,669.4
63.	Beihai Fucheng Airport	Beihai	Guangxi	BHY/ZGBH	1,003,038	14,138	4,011.0
64.	Korla Airport	Korla	Xinjiang	KRL/ZWKL	1,001,541	10,284	3,954.8
65.	Zhanjiang Airport	Zhanjiang	Guangdong	ZHA/ZGZJ	983,519	15,655	3,412.4
66.	Linyi Shubuling Airport	Linyi	Shandong	LYI/ZSLY	949,300	10,388	4,662.7
67.	Yuncheng Zhangxiao Airport	Yuncheng	Shanxi	YCU/ZBYC	935,895	12,028	2,556.1
68.	Nantong Xingdong Airport	Nantong	Jiangsu	NTG/ZSNT	932,368	26,104	28,030.0
69.	Chifeng Yulong Airport	Chifeng	Inner Mongolia	CIF/ZBCF	881,293	10,049	2,707.7
70.	Ganzhou Huangjin Airport	Ganzhou	Jiangxi	KOW/ZSGZ	787,400	7,881	5,543.0
71.	Wuyishan Airport	Wuyishan	Fujian	WUS/ZSWY	785,527	8,213	2,115.9
72.	Dali Huangcaoba Airport	Dali	Yunnan	DLU/ZPDL	749,993	8,407	1,202.8
73.	Aksu Onsu Airport	Aksu	Xinjiang	AKU/ZWAK	748,654	8,250	3,065.0
74.	Luzhou Lantian Airport	Luzhou	Sichuan	LZO/ZULZ	710,510	7,880	2,916.1
75.	Tongliao Airport	Tongliao	Inner Mongolia	TGO/ZBTL	709,072	9,577	3,106.2
76.	Yangzhou Taizhou Airport	Yangzhou, Taizhou	Jiangsu	YTY/ZSYA	705,879	22,956	4,792.5
77.	Yining Airport	Yining	Xinjiang	YIN/ZWYN	698,994	8,068	2,587.0
78.	Xiangyang Liuji Airport	Xiangyang	Hubei	XFN/ZHXF	677,041	56,306	2,388.3
79.	Zunyi Xinzhou Airport	Zunyi	Guizhou	ZYI/ZUZY	669,726	7,509	205.5
80.	Hotan Airport	Hotan	Xinjiang	HTN/ZWTN	669,575	6,428	1,903.1
81.	Taizhou Luqiao Airport	Taizhou	Zhejiang	HYN/ZSLQ	664,663	5,660	7,410.2
82.	Huangshan Tunxi International Airport	Huangshan	Anhui	TXN/ZSTX	637,044	7,574	2,636.7
83.	Changzhi Wangcun Airport	Changzhi	Shanxi	CIH/ZBCZ	620,665	7,799	1,253.1
84.	Liuzhou Bailian Airport	Liuzhou	Guangxi	LZH/ZGZH	606,572	6,908	2,787.8
85.	Luoyang Beijiao Airport	Luoyang	Henan	LYA/ZHLY	588,717	144,046	1,507.8
86.	Yibin Caiba Airport	Yibin	Sichuan	YBP/ZUYB	574,883	6,111	2,608.8
87.	Lianyungang Baitabu Airport	Lianyungang	Jiangsu	LYG/ZSLG	568,642	6,978	1,612.4
88.	Weihai Dashuibo Airport	Weihai	Shandong	WEH/ZSWH	548,306	6,231	2,656.0
89.	Mudanjiang Hailang Airport	Mudanjiang	Heilongjiang	MDG/ZYMD	543,361	4,580	1,368.5
90.	Zhoushan Putuoshan Airport	Zhoushan	Zhejiang	HSN/ZSZS	538,414	15,697	254.9
91.	Yancheng Nanyang Airport	Yancheng	Jiangsu	YNZ/ZSYN	528,749	5,536	2,162.1
92.	Daqing Sartu Airport	Daqing	Heilongjiang	DQA/ZYDQ	525,319	5,000	2,164.8
93.	Huai'an Lianshui Airport	Huai'an	Jiangsu	HIA/ZSSH	516,106	10,546	3,420.9
94.	Tengchong Tuofeng Airport	Tengchong	Yunnan	TCZ/ZUTC	509,628	6,044	820.6
95.	Jiamusi Dongjiao Airport	Jiamusi	Heilongjiang	JMU/ZYJM	470,131	5,143	776.3
96.	Nanyang Jiangying Airport	Nanyang	Henan	NNY/ZHNY	464,512	36,500	1,069.3
97.	Jingdezhen Luojia Airport	Jingdezhen	Jiangxi	JDZ/ZSJD	463,562	4,048	1,808.6
98.	Wuhai Airport	Wuhai	Inner Mongolia	WUA/ZBUH	458,873	5,352	2,017.8
99.	Diqing Shangri-La Airport	Shangri-La	Yunnan	DIG/ZPDQ	453,604	5,190	788.5
100.	Jining Qufu Airport	Jining	Shandong	JNG/ZSJG	451,974	4,612	1,137.6

=== 2013 final statistics ===
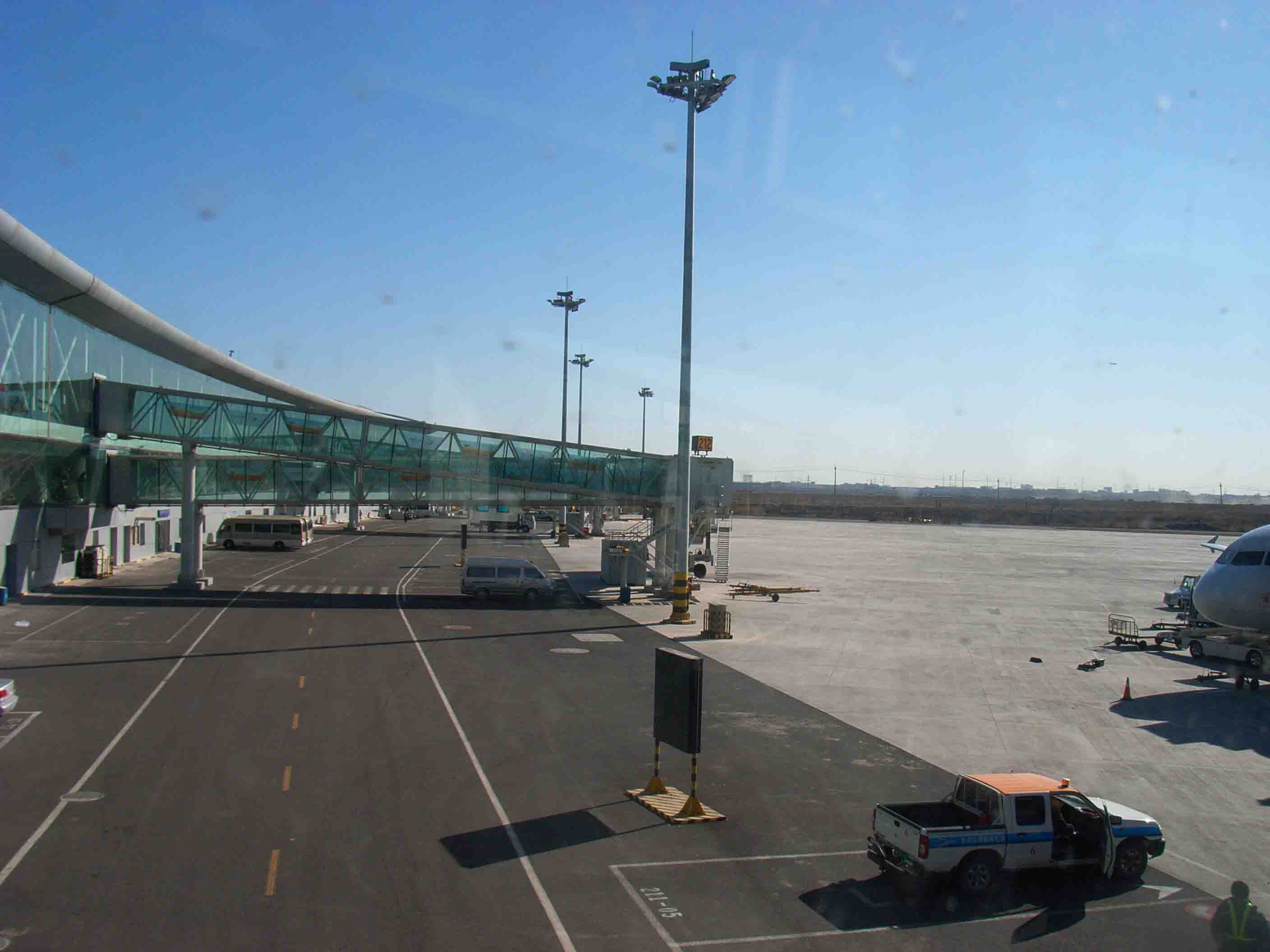
Tianjin Binhai International Airport grew at double digit numbers in 2013. The airport reached 10 million passengers and 100,000 aircraft movements in 2013, and today is the 20th busiest airport in China.

The 100 busiest airports in China in 2013 ordered by total passenger traffic, according to the CAAC report.

Rank	Airport	City served	Division	IATA/ ICAO	Passengers	Aircraft	Cargo
1.	Beijing Capital International Airport	Beijing	Beijing	PEK/ZBAA	83,712,355	567,757	1,843,681.1
2.	Guangzhou Baiyun International Airport	Guangzhou	Guangdong	CAN/ZGGG	52,450,262	394,403	1,309,745.5
3.	Shanghai Pudong International Airport	Shanghai	Shanghai	PVG/ZSPD	47,189,849	371,190	2,928,527.1
4.	Shanghai Hongqiao International Airport	Shanghai	Shanghai	SHA/ZSSS	35,599,643	243,916	435,115.9
5.	Chengdu Shuangliu International Airport	Chengdu	Sichuan	CTU/ZUUU	33,444,618	250,352	501,391.2
6.	Shenzhen Bao'an International Airport	Shenzhen	Guangdong	SZX/ZGSZ	32,268,457	257,446	913,472.1
7.	Kunming Changshui International Airport	Kunming	Yunnan	KMG/ZPPP	29,688,297	255,546	293,627.7
8.	Xi'an Xianyang International Airport	Xi'an, Xianyang	Shaanxi	XIY/ZLXY	26,044,673	226,041	178,857.5
9.	Chongqing Jiangbei International Airport	Chongqing	Chongqing	CKG/ZUCK	25,272,039	214,574	280,149.8
10.	Hangzhou Xiaoshan International Airport	Hangzhou	Zhejiang	HGH/ZSHC	22,114,103	190,639	368,095.3
11.	Xiamen Gaoqi International Airport	Xiamen	Fujian	XMN/ZSAM	19,753,016	166,837	299,490.8
12.	Changsha Huanghua International Airport	Changsha	Hunan	CSX/ZGHA	16,007,212	137,843	117,588.7
13.	Wuhan Tianhe International Airport	Wuhan	Hubei	WUH/ZHHH	15,706,063	148,524	129,450.3
14.	Ürümqi Diwopu International Airport	Ürümqi	Xinjiang	URC/ZWWW	15,359,170	135,874	153,275.3
15.	Nanjing Lukou International Airport	Nanjing	Jiangsu	NKG/ZSNJ	15,011,792	134,913	255,788.6
16.	Qingdao Liuting International Airport	Qingdao	Shandong	TAO/ZSQD	14,516,669	129,751	186,195.7
17.	Dalian Zhoushuizi International Airport	Dalian	Liaoning	DLC/ZYTL	14,083,131	107,709	132,330.4
18.	Zhengzhou Xinzheng International Airport	Zhengzhou	Henan	CGO/ZHCC	13,139,994	127,835	255,712.7
19.	Sanya Phoenix International Airport	Sanya	Hainan	SYX/ZJSY	12,866,869	90,748	62,945.5
20.	Shenyang Taoxian International Airport	Shenyang	Liaoning	SHE/ZYTX	12,106,952	92,300	136,066.1
21.	Haikou Meilan International Airport	Haikou	Hainan	HAK/ZJHK	11,935,470	94,436	111,813.6
22.	Guiyang Longdongbao International Airport	Guiyang	Guizhou	KWE/ZUGY	10,472,589	93,646	77,425.2
23.	Harbin Taiping International Airport	Harbin	Heilongjiang	HRB/ZYHB	10,259,908	84,532	92,309.6
24.	Tianjin Binhai International Airport	Tianjin	Tianjin	TSN/ZBTJ	10,035,833	100,729	214,419.8
25.	Fuzhou Changle International Airport	Fuzhou	Fujian	FOC/ZSFZ	8,925,923	83,406	110,239.4
26.	Nanning Wuxu International Airport	Nanning	Guangxi	NNG/ZGNN	8,157,331	71,408	86,949.6
27.	Jinan Yaoqiang International Airport	Jinan	Shandong	TNA/ZSJN	8,139,087	80,746	72,560.9
28.	Taiyuan Wusu International Airport	Taiyuan, Jinzhong	Shanxi	TYN/ZBYN	7,803,574	76,546	44,354.4
29.	Nanchang Changbei International Airport	Nanchang	Jiangxi	KHN/ZSCN	6,811,028	64,029	40,389.0
30.	Changchun Longjia International Airport	Changchun	Jilin	CGQ/ZYCC	6,733,076	56,850	68,031.6
31.	Wenzhou Longwan International Airport	Wenzhou	Zhejiang	WNZ/ZSWZ	6,595,929	58,867	59,787.1
32.	Hohhot Baita International Airport	Hohhot	Inner Mongolia	HET/ZBHH	6,150,282	62,799	32,599.9
33.	Guilin Liangjiang International Airport	Guilin	Guangxi	KWL/ZGKL	5,875,327	50,696	32,985.8
34.	Lanzhou Zhongchuan Airport	Lanzhou	Gansu	ZGC/ZLLL	5,649,605	51,799	41,752.4
35.	Hefei Xinqiao International Airport	Hefei	Anhui	HFE/ZSOF	5,628,013	52,872	39,984.2
36.	Ningbo Lishe International Airport	Ningbo	Zhejiang	NGB/ZSNB	5,459,333	46,468	64,247.3
37.	Shijiazhuang Zhengding International Airport	Shijiazhuang	Hebei	SJW/ZBSJ	5,110,536	51,980	42,976.2
38.	Beijing Nanyuan Airport	Beijing	Beijing	NAY/ZBNY	4,455,263	38,661	37,091.9
39.	Yinchuan Hedong International Airport	Yinchuan	Ningxia	INC/ZLIC	4,247,843	39,230	29,105.0
40.	Lijiang Sanyi Airport	Lijiang	Yunnan	LJG/ZPLJ	3,999,422	37,015	6,356.1
41.	Yantai Laishan International Airport	Yantai	Shandong	YNT/ZSYT	3,635,467	38,252	45,319.1
42.	Sunan Shuofang International Airport	Wuxi, Suzhou	Jiangsu	WUX/ZSWX	3,590,188	31,844	87,641.6
43.	Xining Caojiabao Airport	Xining, Haidong	Qinghai	XNN/ZLXN	3,236,417	28,792	19,940.1
44.	Xishuangbanna Gasa Airport	Jinghong	Yunnan	JHG/ZPJH	3,050,170	29,164	6,580.9
45.	Zhuhai Jinwan Airport	Zhuhai	Guangdong	ZUH/ZGSD	2,894,357	44,725	22,667.1
46.	Jieyang Chaoshan Airport	Jieyang, Chaozhou, Shantou	Guangdong	SWA/ZGOW	2,686,007	32,391	17,303.8
47.	Quanzhou Jinjiang Airport	Quanzhou	Fujian	JJN/ZSQZ	2,634,423	25,102	38,771.7
48.	Lhasa Gonggar Airport	Lhasa, Shannan	Tibet	LXA/ZULS	2,296,958	21,035	20,967.7
49.	Ordos Ejin Horo Airport	Ordos	Inner Mongolia	DSN/ZBDS	1,731,882	29,584	9,455.7
50.	Baotou Erliban Airport	Baotou	Inner Mongolia	BAV/ZBOW	1,708,846	14,965	10,011.6
51.	Changzhou Benniu Airport	Changzhou	Jiangsu	CZX/ZSCG	1,526,605	19,348	15,250.7
52.	Jiuzhai Huanglong Airport	Jiuzhaigou	Sichuan	JZH/ZUJZ	1,350,872	13,592	0.0
53.	Hulunbuir Hailar Airport	Hailar	Inner Mongolia	HLD/ZBLA	1,287,483	12,685	5,590.8
54.	Yulin Yuyang Airport	Yulin	Shaanxi	UYN/ZLYL	1,191,031	13,924	2,875.3
55.	Yiwu Airport	Yiwu	Zhejiang	YIW/ZSYW	1,161,463	10,632	3,452.7
56.	Kashgar Airport	Kashgar	Xinjiang	KHG/ZWSH	1,149,428	10,862	6,280.5
57.	Weihai Dashuibo Airport	Weihai	Shandong	WEH/ZSWH	1,145,846	13,263	5,683.6
58.	Yanji Chaoyangchuan Airport	Yanji	Jilin	YNJ/ZYYJ	1,114,829	9,060	5,787.9
59.	Xuzhou Guanyin Airport	Xuzhou	Jiangsu	XUZ/ZSXZ	1,112,811	37,822	6,298.0
60.	Yuncheng Zhangxiao Airport	Yuncheng	Shanxi	YCU/ZBYC	1,010,070	9,507	2,818.7
61.	Zhangjiajie Hehua Airport	Zhangjiajie	Hunan	DYG/ZGDY	1,006,334	8,557	2,301.7
62.	Dehong Mangshi Airport	Mangshi	Yunnan	LUM/ZPLX	929,540	9,248	4,437.7
63.	Mianyang Nanjiao Airport	Mianyang	Sichuan	MIG/ZUMY	917,325	201,022	4,856.3
64.	Yichang Sanxia Airport	Yichang	Hubei	YIH/ZHYC	900,076	39,444	4,628.4
65.	Beihai Fucheng Airport	Beihai	Guangxi	BHY/ZGBH	848,338	11,412	4,813.5
66.	Wuyishan Airport	Wuyishan	Fujian	WUS/ZSWY	787,455	8,094	2,392.1
67.	Linyi Shubuling Airport	Linyi	Shandong	LYI/ZSLY	767,844	8,539	4,100.4
68.	Liuzhou Bailian Airport	Liuzhou	Guangxi	LZH/ZGZH	733,774	10,706	4,576.8
69.	Korla Airport	Korla	Xinjiang	KRL/ZWKL	731,522	8,097	3,066.6
70.	Zhanjiang Airport	Zhanjiang	Guangdong	ZHA/ZGZJ	691,443	12,180	2,663.4
71.	Nantong Xingdong Airport	Nantong	Jiangsu	NTG/ZSNT	675,660	30,749	21,593.4
72.	Chifeng Yulong Airport	Chifeng	Inner Mongolia	CIF/ZBCF	660,704	7,533	1,801.4
73.	Aksu Onsu Airport	Aksu	Xinjiang	AKU/ZWAK	631,843	7,554	1,802.4
74.	Ganzhou Huangjin Airport	Ganzhou	Jiangxi	KOW/ZSGZ	626,849	7,038	3,795.5
75.	Yangzhou Taizhou Airport	Yangzhou, Taizhou	Jiangsu	YTY/ZSYA	612,899	15,943	3,076.2
76.	Taizhou Luqiao Airport	Taizhou	Zhejiang	HYN/ZSLQ	610,844	5,208	6,912.1
77.	Xiangyang Liuji Airport	Xiangyang	Hubei	XFN/ZHXF	601,029	55,014	2,151.7
78.	Luoyang Beijiao Airport	Luoyang	Henan	LYA/ZHLY	594,781	180,126	1,421.6
79.	Yining Airport	Yining	Xinjiang	YIN/ZWYN	581,589	7,340	2,000.7
80.	Changzhi Wangcun Airport	Changzhi	Shanxi	CIH/ZBCZ	574,080	7,230	919.5
81.	Tongliao Airport	Tongliao	Inner Mongolia	TGO/ZBTL	572,719	8,722	1,810.7
82.	Lianyungang Baitabu Airport	Lianyungang	Jiangsu	LYG/ZSLG	563,584	8,668	1,462.9
83.	Tengchong Tuofeng Airport	Tengchong	Yunnan	TCZ/ZUTC	556,769	6,254	410.3
84.	Huangshan Tunxi International Airport	Huangshan	Anhui	TXN/ZSTX	552,359	6,508	2,520.7
85.	Daqing Sartu Airport	Daqing	Heilongjiang	DQA/ZYDQ	541,420	5,596	2,592.7
86.	Diqing Shangri-La Airport	Shangri-La	Yunnan	DIG/ZPDQ	501,754	5,606	686.2
87.	Dali Huangcaoba Airport	Dali	Yunnan	DLU/ZPDL	501,128	5,923	569.0
88.	Hotan Airport	Hotan	Xinjiang	HTN/ZWTN	494,824	4,816	1,544.5
89.	Zhoushan Putuoshan Airport	Zhoushan	Zhejiang	HSN/ZSZS	479,138	12,839	286.2
90.	Wuhai Airport	Wuhai	Inner Mongolia	WUA/ZBUH	470,152	5,864	1,438.6
91.	Xilinhot Airport	Xilinhot	Inner Mongolia	XIL/ZBXH	465,949	18,086	2,074.0
92.	Mudanjiang Hailang Airport	Mudanjiang	Heilongjiang	MDG/ZYMD	446,644	4,716	1,230.7
93.	Jinggangshan Airport	Ji'an	Jiangxi	JGS/ZSGS	444,378	4,870	1,831.0
94.	Luzhou Lantian Airport	Luzhou	Sichuan	LZO/ZULZ	439,626	5,124	2,399.8
95.	Yibin Caiba Airport	Yibin	Sichuan	YBP/ZUYB	434,022	4,506	2,497.8
96.	Jiamusi Dongjiao Airport	Jiamusi	Heilongjiang	JMU/ZYJM	416,926	4,767	742.3
97.	Nanyang Jiangying Airport	Nanyang	Henan	NNY/ZHNY	405,929	33,328	821.2
98.	Jingdezhen Luojia Airport	Jingdezhen	Jiangxi	JDZ/ZSJD	405,021	3,604	631.0
99.	Huai'an Lianshui Airport	Huai'an	Jiangsu	HIA/ZSSH	404,776	40,594	2,529.2
100.	Datong Yungang Airport	Datong	Shanxi	DAT/ZBDT	358,910	14,121	1,965.1

=== 2012 final statistics ===
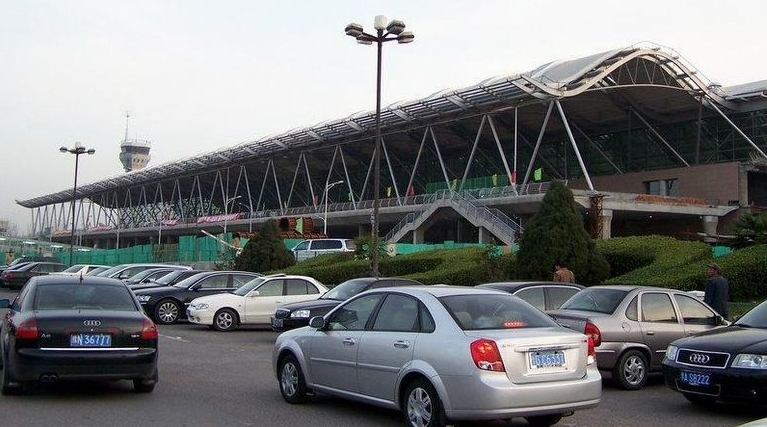
Zhengzhou Xinzheng International Airport wins importance as cargo hub. Henan's main airport grew 47% in cargo movements in 2012.

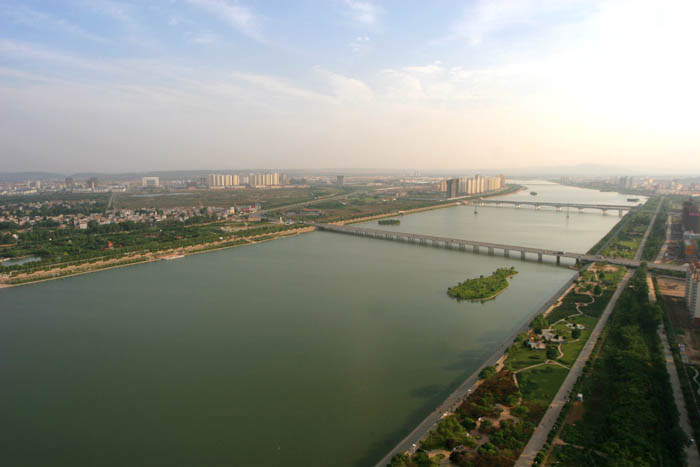
Luoyang Beijiao Airport, serving one of the Four Great Ancient Capitals, is one of the busiest airports by aircraft movements, but in 2012 it was also the fastest growing between China's top 100 in passenger traffic

The 100 busiest airports in China in 2012 ordered by total passenger traffic, according to the CAAC report.

Rank	Airport	City served	Division	IATA/ ICAO	Passengers	Aircraft	Cargo
1.	Beijing Capital International Airport	Beijing	Beijing	PEK/ZBAA	81,929,352	557,159	1,799,863.7
2.	Guangzhou Baiyun International Airport	Guangzhou	Guangdong	CAN/ZGGG	48,309,410	373,314	1,248,763.8
3.	Shanghai Pudong International Airport	Shanghai	Shanghai	PVG/ZSPD	44,880,164	361,720	2,938,156.9
4.	Shanghai Hongqiao International Airport	Shanghai	Shanghai	SHA/ZSSS	33,828,726	234,942	429,813.9
5.	Chengdu Shuangliu International Airport	Chengdu	Sichuan	CTU/ZUUU	31,595,130	242,658	508,031.4
6.	Shenzhen Bao'an International Airport	Shenzhen	Guangdong	SZX/ZGSZ	29,569,725	240,055	854,901.4
7.	Kunming Changshui International Airport	Kunming	Yunnan	KMG/ZPPP	23,979,259	201,338	262,272.3
8.	Xi'an Xianyang International Airport	Xi'an, Xianyang	Shaanxi	XIY/ZLXY	23,420,654	204,427	174,782.7
9.	Chongqing Jiangbei International Airport	Chongqing	Chongqing	CKG/ZUCK	22,057,003	195,333	268,642.4
10.	Hangzhou Xiaoshan International Airport	Hangzhou	Zhejiang	HGH/ZSHC	19,115,320	166,340	338,371.1
11.	Xiamen Gaoqi International Airport	Xiamen	Fujian	XMN/ZSAM	17,354,076	146,183	271,465.8
12.	Changsha Huanghua International Airport	Changsha	Hunan	CSX/ZGHA	14,749,701	127,041	110,608.0
13.	Nanjing Lukou International Airport	Nanjing	Jiangsu	NKG/ZSNJ	14,001,476	128,440	248,067.5
14.	Wuhan Tianhe International Airport	Wuhan	Hubei	WUH/ZHHH	13,980,527	132,417	128,196.2
15.	Ürümqi Diwopu International Airport	Ürümqi	Xinjiang	URC/ZWWW	13,347,188	118,701	131,372.5
16.	Dalian Zhoushuizi International Airport	Dalian	Liaoning	DLC/ZYTL	13,337,184	100,231	136,546.8
17.	Qingdao Liuting International Airport	Qingdao	Shandong	TAO/ZSQD	12,601,152	116,176	171,891.9
18.	Zhengzhou Xinzheng International Airport	Zhengzhou	Henan	CGO/ZHCC	11,673,612	109,249	151,193.5
19.	Sanya Phoenix International Airport	Sanya	Hainan	SYX/ZJSY	11,343,387	81,456	52,603.9
20.	Shenyang Taoxian International Airport	Shenyang	Liaoning	SHE/ZYTX	11,011,800	82,294	131,931.3
21.	Haikou Meilan International Airport	Haikou	Hainan	HAK/ZJHK	10,696,585	87,245	99,944.9
22.	Harbin Taiping International Airport	Harbin	Heilongjiang	HRB/ZYHB	9,143,823	74,626	85,947.8
23.	Guiyang Longdongbao International Airport	Guiyang	Guizhou	KWE/ZUGY	8,746,034	77,173	79,586.5
24.	Tianjin Binhai International Airport	Tianjin	Tianjin	TSN/ZBTJ	8,139,988	83,700	194,241.0
25.	Fuzhou Changle International Airport	Fuzhou	Fujian	FOC/ZSFZ	7,851,966	72,512	96,948.1
26.	Jinan Yaoqiang International Airport	Jinan	Shandong	TNA/ZSJN	7,664,111	78,465	74,070.2
27.	Nanning Wuxu International Airport	Nanning	Guangxi	NNG/ZGNN	7,032,312	61,793	78,134.4
28.	Taiyuan Wusu International Airport	Taiyuan, Jinzhong	Shanxi	TYN/ZBYN	6,813,265	68,789	42,258.9
29.	Nanchang Changbei International Airport	Nanchang	Jiangxi	KHN/ZSCN	6,018,223	55,783	37,856.9
30.	Changchun Longjia International Airport	Changchun	Jilin	CGQ/ZYCC	5,819,581	49,732	66,213.6
31.	Guilin Liangjiang International Airport	Guilin	Guangxi	KWL/ZGKL	5,687,449	48,531	33,762.4
32.	Wenzhou Yongqiang International Airport	Wenzhou	Zhejiang	WNZ/ZSWZ	5,637,303	50,211	49,714.1
33.	Hohhot Baita International Airport	Hohhot	Inner Mongolia	HET/ZBHH	5,435,237	55,990	28,673.6
34.	Ningbo Lishe International Airport	Ningbo	Zhejiang	NGB/ZSNB	5,266,738	44,924	61,662.4
35.	Hefei Luogang International Airport	Hefei	Anhui	HFE/ZSOF	5,194,178	51,641	42,602.4
36.	Shijiazhuang Zhengding International Airport	Shijiazhuang	Hebei	SJW/ZBSJ	4,852,071	54,647	39,660.9
37.	Lanzhou Zhongchuan Airport	Lanzhou	Gansu	ZGC/ZLLL	4,583,509	43,146	35,946.9
38.	Yinchuan Hedong Airport	Yinchuan	Ningxia	INC/ZLIC	3,809,550	33,950	26,901.0
39.	Beijing Nanyuan Airport	Beijing	Beijing	NAY/ZBNY	3,459,887	29,365	30,054.0
40.	Sunan Shuofang International Airport	Wuxi, Suzhou	Jiangsu	WUX/ZSWX	3,238,638	28,499	84,026.7
41.	Yantai Laishan International Airport	Yantai	Shandong	YNT/ZSYT	2,984,465	31,301	37,233.9
42.	Lijiang Sanyi Airport	Lijiang	Yunnan	LJG/ZPLJ	2,884,335	26,097	6,951.3
43.	Xining Caojiabao Airport	Xining, Haidong	Qinghai	XNN/ZLXN	2,664,488	23,864	15,278.1
44.	Xishuangbanna Gasa Airport	Jinghong	Yunnan	JHG/ZPJH	2,307,830	21,234	4,888.4
45.	Quanzhou Jinjiang Airport	Quanzhou	Fujian	JJN/ZSQZ	2,149,502	21,211	35,711.1
46.	Jieyang Chaoshan Airport	Jieyang, Chaozhou, Shantou	Guangdong	SWA/ZGOW	2,103,303	21,316	10,646.9
47.	Zhuhai Jinwan Airport	Zhuhai	Guangdong	ZUH/ZGSD	2,090,491	43,815	16,270.4
48.	Lhasa Gonggar Airport	Lhasa, Shannan	Tibet	LXA/ZULS	1,829,792	17,084	15,339.3
49.	Ordos Ejin Horo Airport	Ordos	Inner Mongolia	DSN/ZBDS	1,800,572	22,912	9,752.4
50.	Jiuzhai Huanglong Airport	Jiuzhaigou	Sichuan	JZH/ZUJZ	1,752,937	16,632	0.0
51.	Baotou Erliban Airport	Baotou	Inner Mongolia	BAV/ZBOW	1,625,870	13,623	9,265.2
52.	Zhangjiajie Hehua Airport	Zhangjiajie	Hunan	DYG/ZGDY	1,135,202	9,234	2,224.9
53.	Kashgar Airport	Kashgar	Xinjiang	KHG/ZWSH	1,086,340	9,406	4,744.3
54.	Changzhou Benniu Airport	Changzhou	Jiangsu	CZX/ZSCG	1,078,444	22,367	11,057.6
55.	Yulin Yuyang Airport	Yulin	Shaanxi	UYN/ZLYL	1,066,322	11,691	2,408.1
56.	Yanji Chaoyangchuan Airport	Yanji	Jilin	YNJ/ZYYJ	1,059,528	7,972	5,391.4
57.	Hulunbuir Hailar Airport	Hailar	Inner Mongolia	HLD/ZBLA	1,011,775	9,640	4,045.4
58.	Xuzhou Guanyin Airport	Xuzhou	Jiangsu	XUZ/ZSXZ	974,120	28,091	6,069.2
59.	Yiwu Airport	Yiwu	Zhejiang	YIW/ZSYW	936,785	8,330	2,696.6
60.	Yuncheng Zhangxiao Airport	Yuncheng	Shanxi	YCU/ZBYC	923,691	9,641	2,430.2
61.	Weihai Dashuibo Airport	Weihai	Shandong	WEH/ZSWH	912,220	10,548	5,092.5
62.	Yichang Sanxia Airport	Yichang	Hubei	YIH/ZHYC	901,366	43,354	3,995.5
63.	Liuzhou Bailian Airport	Liuzhou	Guangxi	LZH/ZGZH	773,459	11,931	6,214.2
64.	Linyi Shubuling Airport	Linyi	Shandong	LYI/ZSLY	735,463	8,015	4,097.9
65.	Luoyang Beijiao Airport	Luoyang	Henan	LYA/ZHLY	719,845	211,798	1,060.8
66.	Beihai Fucheng Airport	Beihai	Guangxi	BHY/ZGBH	713,555	21,096	4,260.2
67.	Wuyishan Airport	Wuyishan	Fujian	WUS/ZSWY	690,236	6,040	1,657.6
68.	Dehong Mangshi Airport	Mangshi	Yunnan	LUM/ZPLX	689,594	6,605	4,882.1
69.	Mianyang Nanjiao Airport	Mianyang	Sichuan	MIG/ZUMY	681,217	207,112	4,935.2
70.	Tengchong Tuofeng Airport	Tengchong	Yunnan	TCZ/ZUTC	643,901	6,694	884.9
71.	Ganzhou Huangjin Airport	Ganzhou	Jiangxi	KOW/ZSGZ	601,658	7,041	4,566.8
72.	Korla Airport	Korla	Xinjiang	KRL/ZWKL	595,413	7,244	2,345.7
73.	Yining Airport	Yining	Xinjiang	YIN/ZWYN	553,839	7,009	1,669.0
74.	Huangshan Tunxi International Airport	Huangshan	Anhui	TXN/ZSTX	547,703	5,932	1,885.0
75.	Zhanjiang Airport	Zhanjiang	Guangdong	ZHA/ZGZJ	517,236	9,697	2,427.9
76.	Changzhi Wangcun Airport	Changzhi	Shanxi	CIH/ZBCZ	501,890	6,459	1,669.0
77.	Lianyungang Baitabu Airport	Lianyungang	Jiangsu	LYG/ZSLG	483,768	6,229	1,387.8
78.	Aksu Onsu Airport	Aksu	Xinjiang	AKU/ZWAK	483,563	5,962	1,113.8
79.	Zhoushan Putuoshan Airport	Zhoushan	Zhejiang	HSN/ZSZS	464,077	12,317	425.1
80.	Daqing Sartu Airport	Daqing	Heilongjiang	DQA/ZYDQ	452,966	4,351	2,288.1
81.	Hotan Airport	Hotan	Xinjiang	HTN/ZWTN	452,676	4,262	1,408.8
82.	Diqing Shangri-La Airport	Shangri-La	Yunnan	DIG/ZPDQ	429,495	4,790	460.4
83.	Jingdezhen Luojia Airport	Jingdezhen	Jiangxi	JDZ/ZSJD	425,538	3,820	1,022.4
84.	Taizhou Luqiao Airport	Taizhou	Zhejiang	HYN/ZSLQ	403,997	3,638	4,384.6
85.	Xiangyang Liuji Airport	Xiangyang	Hubei	XFN/ZHXF	402,244	50,955	1,025.4
86.	Jinggangshan Airport	Ji'an	Jiangxi	JGS/ZSGS	401,601	4,400	1,574.6
87.	Chifeng Yulong Airport	Chifeng	Inner Mongolia	CIF/ZBCF	394,830	5,290	1,245.0
88.	Mudanjiang Hailang Airport	Mudanjiang	Heilongjiang	MDG/ZYMD	392,205	4,240	1,472.9
89.	Nantong Xingdong Airport	Nantong	Jiangsu	NTG/ZSNT	386,021	32,092	11,104.9
90.	Dali Huangcaoba Airport	Dali	Yunnan	DLU/ZPDL	377,934	4,090	596.2
91.	Xichang Qingshan Airport	Xichang	Sichuan	XIC/ZUXC	366,534	3,842	2,306.4
92.	Xilinhot Airport	Xilinhot	Inner Mongolia	XIL/ZBXH	361,245	11,675	1,378.8
93.	Huai'an Lianshui Airport	Huai'an	Jiangsu	HIA/ZSSH	346,867	9,189	1,910.2
94.	Tongliao Airport	Tongliao	Inner Mongolia	TGO/ZBTL	343,840	6,809	1,485.2
95.	Wuhai Airport	Wuhai	Inner Mongolia	WUA/ZBUH	322,195	3,607	1,220.3
96.	Yancheng Nanyang Airport	Yancheng	Jiangsu	YNZ/ZSYN	316,913	3,350	2,842.4
97.	Dunhuang Airport	Dunhuang	Gansu	DNH/ZLDH	315,570	4,666	182.8
98.	Luzhou Lantian Airport	Luzhou	Sichuan	LZO/ZULZ	311,774	3,916	2,138.4
99.	Jiamusi Dongjiao Airport	Jiamusi	Heilongjiang	JMU/ZYJM	309,034	4,182	615.8
100.	Yibin Caiba Airport	Yibin	Sichuan	YBP/ZUYB	305,217	3,511	2,760.5

=== 2011 final statistics ===
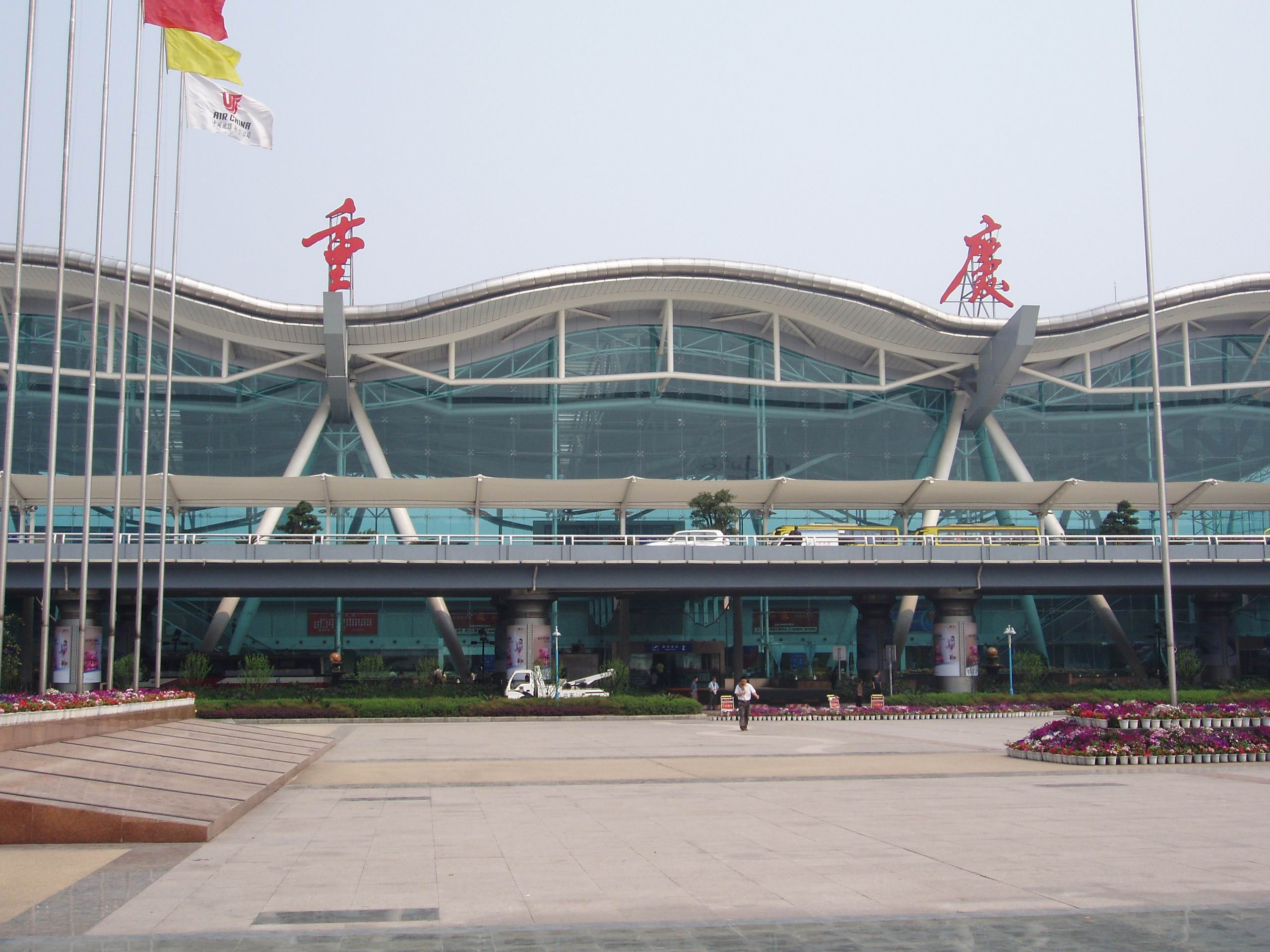
In 2011, Chongqing Jiangbei International Airport received over three million passengers more than in 2010. That year the airport surpassed Hangzhou Xiaoshan Airport to become the ninth busiest in China, a position that has maintain since then

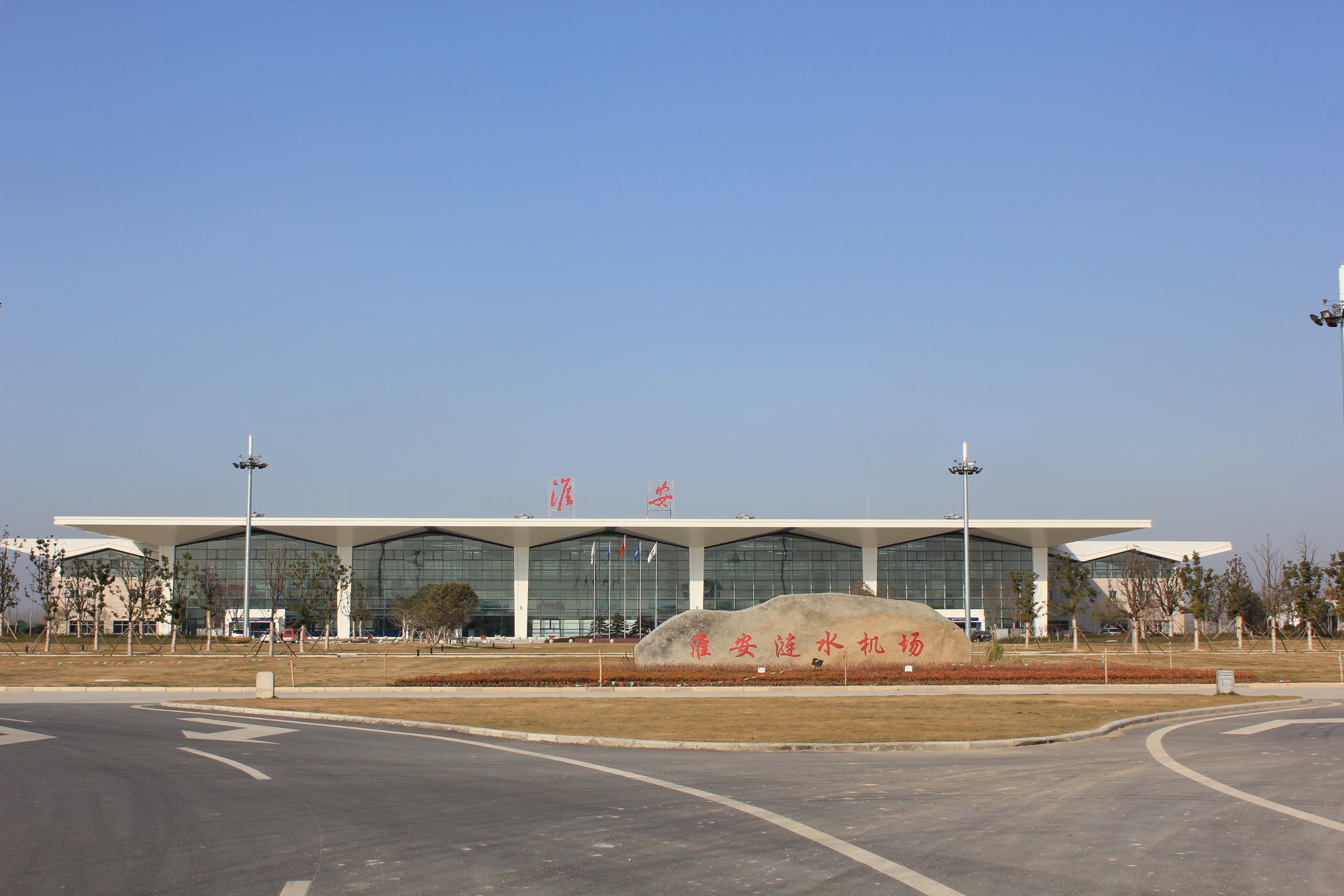
Huai'an Lianshui Airport was the best performer between the top 100 in passenger traffic, aircraft movements and cargo increase in 2011.

The 100 busiest airports in China in 2011 ordered by total passenger traffic, according to the CAAC report.

Rank	Airport	City served	Division	IATA/ ICAO	Passengers	Aircraft	Cargo
1.	Beijing Capital International Airport	Beijing	Beijing	PEK/ZBAA	78,674,513	533,166	1,640,231.8
2.	Guangzhou Baiyun International Airport	Guangzhou	Guangdong	CAN/ZGGG	45,040,340	349,259	1,179,967.7
3.	Shanghai Pudong International Airport	Shanghai	Shanghai	PVG/ZSPD	41,447,730	344,086	3,085,267.7
4.	Shanghai Hongqiao International Airport	Shanghai	Shanghai	SHA/ZSSS	33,112,442	229,846	454,069.4
5.	Chengdu Shuangliu International Airport	Chengdu	Sichuan	CTU/ZUUU	29,073,719	222,421	477,695.2
6.	Shenzhen Bao'an International Airport	Shenzhen	Guangdong	SZX/ZGSZ	28,245,738	224,329	828,375.2
7.	Kunming Wujiaba International Airport	Kunming	Yunnan	KMG/ZPPP	22,270,130	191,744	272,465.4
8.	Xi'an Xianyang International Airport	Xi'an, Xianyang	Shaanxi	XIY/ZLXY	21,163,130	185,079	172,567.4
9.	Chongqing Jiangbei International Airport	Chongqing	Chongqing	CKG/ZUCK	19,052,706	166,763	237,572.5
10.	Hangzhou Xiaoshan International Airport	Hangzhou	Zhejiang	HGH/ZSHC	17,512,224	149,480	306,242.6
11.	Xiamen Gaoqi International Airport	Xiamen	Fujian	XMN/ZSAM	15,757,049	135,618	260,575.1
12.	Changsha Huanghua International Airport	Changsha	Hunan	CSX/ZGHA	13,684,731	116,727	114,831.1
13.	Nanjing Lukou International Airport	Nanjing	Jiangsu	NKG/ZSNJ	13,074,097	120,534	246,572.2
14.	Wuhan Tianhe International Airport	Wuhan	Hubei	WUH/ZHHH	12,462,016	117,010	122,762.4
15.	Dalian Zhoushuizi International Airport	Dalian	Liaoning	DLC/ZYTL	12,012,094	94,344	137,859.1
16.	Qingdao Liuting International Airport	Qingdao	Shandong	TAO/ZSQD	11,716,361	105,835	166,533.1
17.	Ürümqi Diwopu International Airport	Ürümqi	Xinjiang	URC/ZWWW	11,078,597	97,801	107,580.5
18.	Sanya Phoenix International Airport	Sanya	Hainan	SYX/ZJSY	10,361,821	74,392	48,290.8
19.	Shenyang Taoxian International Airport	Shenyang	Liaoning	SHE/ZYTX	10,231,185	77,866	133,903.5
20.	Haikou Meilan International Airport	Haikou	Hainan	HAK/ZJHK	10,167,818	83,057	97,826.9
21.	Zhengzhou Xinzheng International Airport	Zhengzhou	Henan	CGO/ZHCC	10,150,075	93,014	102,802.4
22.	Jinan Yaoqiang International Airport	Jinan	Shandong	TNA/ZSJN	7,879,707	62,520	76,490.6
23.	Harbin Taiping International Airport	Harbin	Heilongjiang	HRB/ZYHB	7,841,521	62,520	76,490.6
24.	Tianjin Binhai International Airport	Tianjin	Tianjin	TSN/ZBTJ	7,554,172	84,831	182,856.7
25.	Guiyang Longdongbao International Airport	Guiyang	Guizhou	KWE/ZUGY	7,339,228	67,759	69,130.3
26.	Fuzhou Changle International Airport	Fuzhou	Fujian	FOC/ZSFZ	7,196,800	67,866	87,573.8
27.	Nanning Wuxu International Airport	Nanning	Guangxi	NNG/ZGNN	6,464,428	59,181	67,633.5
28.	Taiyuan Wusu International Airport	Taiyuan, Jinzhong	Shanxi	TYN/ZBYN	5,876,005	62,746	39,702.7
29.	Wenzhou Yongqiang International Airport	Wenzhou	Zhejiang	WNZ/ZSWZ	5,598,674	49,995	48,997.2
30.	Guilin Liangjiang International Airport	Guilin	Guangxi	KWL/ZGKL	5,489,481	47,431	33,613.7
31.	Nanchang Changbei International Airport	Nanchang	Jiangxi	KHN/ZSCN	5,347,853	50,177	34,330.5
32.	Ningbo Lishe International Airport	Ningbo	Zhejiang	NGB/ZSNB	5,014,002	44,083	58,763.0
33.	Changchun Longjia International Airport	Changchun	Jilin	CGQ/ZYCC	4,971,667	41,364	62,255.8
34.	Hefei Luogang International Airport	Hefei	Anhui	HFE/ZSOF	4,398,739	48,001	38,425.3
35.	Hohhot Baita International Airport	Hohhot	Inner Mongolia	HET/ZBHH	4,331,529	48,870	25,218.2
36.	Shijiazhuang Zhengding International Airport	Shijiazhuang	Hebei	SJW/ZBSJ	4,021,167	54,903	33,229.1
37.	Lanzhou Zhongchuan Airport	Lanzhou	Gansu	ZGC/ZLLL	3,809,023	34,510	32,033.3
38.	Yinchuan Hedong Airport	Yinchuan	Ningxia	INC/ZLIC	3,376,964	29,889	23,742.5
39.	Sunan Shuofang International Airport	Wuxi, Suzhou	Jiangsu	WUX/ZSWX	2,940,122	26,040	66,208.0
40.	Beijing Nanyuan Airport	Beijing	Beijing	NAY/ZBNY	2,644,598	21,642	23,557.3
41.	Yantai Laishan International Airport	Yantai	Shandong	YNT/ZSYT	2,547,499	26,573	40,331.6
42.	Lijiang Sanyi Airport	Lijiang	Yunnan	LJG/ZPLJ	2,183,597	20,138	4,370.2
43.	Xining Caojiabu Airport	Xining, Haidong	Qinghai	XNN/ZLXN	2,030,378	18,176	11,882.3
44.	Quanzhou Jinjiang Airport	Quanzhou	Fujian	JJN/ZSQZ	1,975,836	19,992	31,226.6
45.	Xishuangbanna Gasa Airport	Jinghong	Yunnan	JHG/ZPJH	1,918,825	17,729	4,814.8
46.	Jieyang Chaoshan Airport	Jieyang, Chaozhou, Shantou	Guangdong	SWA/ZGOW	1,901,856	17,903	10,160.9
47.	Zhuhai Jinwan Airport	Zhuhai	Guangdong	ZUH/ZGSD	1,797,306	48,059	16,768.3
48.	Jiuzhai Huanglong Airport	Jiuzhaigou	Sichuan	JZH/ZUJZ	1,717,603	14,946	0.0
49.	Lhasa Gonggar Airport	Lhasa, Shannan	Tibet	LXA/ZULS	1,581,538	13,932	11,347.1
50.	Baotou Erliban Airport	Baotou	Inner Mongolia	BAV/ZBOW	1,345,598	11,261	7,491.7
51.	Ordos Ejin Horo Airport	Ordos	Inner Mongolia	DSN/ZBDS	1,301,806	14,118	5,992.9
52.	Zhangjiajie Hehua Airport	Zhangjiajie	Hunan	DYG/ZGDY	1,148,396	9,381	2,075.7
53.	Yanji Chaoyangchuan Airport	Yanji	Jilin	YNJ/ZYYJ	1,016,274	7,884	4,915.6
54.	Weihai Dashuibo Airport	Weihai	Shandong	WEH/ZSWH	935,450	12,006	4,570.4
55.	Changzhou Benniu Airport	Changzhou	Jiangsu	CZX/ZSCG	933,663	10,160	8,362.7
56.	Kashgar Airport	Kashgar	Xinjiang	KHG/ZWSH	912,591	9,880	3,705.7
57.	Yulin Yuyang Airport	Yulin	Shaanxi	UYN/ZLYL	910,424	10,304	1,312.5
58.	Xuzhou Guanyin Airport	Xuzhou	Jiangsu	XUZ/ZSXZ	846,267	11,523	4,930.0
59.	Yichang Sanxia Airport	Yichang	Hubei	YIH/ZHYC	778,004	45,492	3,769.3
60.	Yiwu Airport	Yiwu	Zhejiang	YIW/ZSYW	761,938	6,746	3,414.0
61.	Yuncheng Zhangxiao Airport	Yuncheng	Shanxi	YCU/ZBYC	749,924	8,132	2,192.6
62.	Hailar Dongshan Airport	Hailar	Inner Mongolia	HLD/ZBLA	713,037	7,632	2,986.9
63.	Beihai Fucheng Airport	Beihai	Guangxi	BHY/ZGBH	699,148	24,931	4,027.9
64.	Linyi Shubuling Airport	Linyi	Shandong	LYI/ZSLY	666,024	7,181	3,200.4
65.	Taizhou Luqiao Airport	Taizhou	Zhejiang	HYN/ZSLQ	628,268	6,212	6,179.1
66.	Mianyang Nanjiao Airport	Mianyang	Sichuan	MIG/ZUMY	622,816	207,140	4,491.5
67.	Liuzhou Bailian Airport	Liuzhou	Guangxi	LZH/ZGZH	600,856	9,136	5,035.3
68.	Wuyishan Airport	Wuyishan	Fujian	WUS/ZSWY	594,562	5,249	839.6
69.	Xichang Qingshan Airport	Xichang	Sichuan	XIC/ZUXC	522,093	5,156	3,366.6
70.	Tengchong Tuofeng Airport	Tengchong	Yunnan	TCZ/ZUTC	517,838	5,258	981.2
71.	Ganzhou Huangjin Airport	Ganzhou	Jiangxi	KOW/ZSGZ	515,068	6,106	2,948.1
72.	Dehong Mangshi Airport	Mangshi	Yunnan	LUM/ZPLX	506,452	4,927	3,929.9
73.	Zhanjiang Airport	Zhanjiang	Guangdong	ZHA/ZGZJ	488,835	9,065	2,104.2
74.	Yining Airport	Yining	Xinjiang	YIN/ZWYN	483,967	6,562	712.7
75.	Huangshan Tunxi International Airport	Huangshan	Anhui	TXN/ZSTX	465,336	5,024	1,429.5
76.	Lianyungang Baitabu Airport	Lianyungang	Jiangsu	LYG/ZSLG	460,784	5,408	1,374.4
77.	Korla Airport	Korla	Xinjiang	KRL/ZWKL	415,277	6,160	2,116.2
78.	Changzhi Wangcun Airport	Changzhi	Shanxi	CIH/ZBCZ	412,167	5,555	1,641.3
79.	Aksu Onsu Airport	Aksu	Xinjiang	AKU/ZWAK	412,085	5,460	833.6
80.	Daqing Sartu Airport	Daqing	Heilongjiang	DQA/ZYDQ	404,083	3,645	1,939.5
81.	Zhoushan Putuoshan Airport	Zhoushan	Zhejiang	HSN/ZSZS	384,859	10,314	286.6
82.	Diqing Shangri-La Airport	Shangri-La	Yunnan	DIG/ZPDQ	374,710	4,167	512.5
83.	Hotan Airport	Hotan	Xinjiang	HTN/ZWTN	359,040	3,236	1,270.4
84.	Jingdezhen Luojia Airport	Jingdezhen	Jiangxi	JDZ/ZSJD	355,930	3,104	678.5
85.	Luoyang Beijiao Airport	Luoyang	Henan	LYA/ZHLY	354,677	198,086	1,158.3
86.	Yibin Caiba Airport	Yibin	Sichuan	YBP/ZUYB	325,560	3,859	2,737.6
87.	Mudanjiang Hailang Airport	Mudanjiang	Heilongjiang	MDG/ZYMD	313,333	3,202	1,387.2
88.	Changde Taohuayuan Airport	Changde	Hunan	CGD/ZGCD	308,559	60,399	159.7
89.	Chifeng Yulong Airport	Chifeng	Inner Mongolia	CIF/ZBCF	304,642	4,757	509.3
90.	Jinggangshan Airport	Ji'an	Jiangxi	JGS/ZSGS	302,406	3,502	1,121.5
91.	Luzhou Lantian Airport	Luzhou	Sichuan	LZO/ZULZ	284,886	3,518	2,425.6
92.	Dali Huangcaoba Airport	Dali	Yunnan	DLU/ZPDL	274,486	3,559	952.9
93.	Xilinhot Airport	Xilinhot	Inner Mongolia	XIL/ZBXH	258,918	4,133	445.7
94.	Wanzhou Wuqiao Airport	Wanzhou	Chongqing	WXN/ZULP	251,169	3,846	2,000.6
95.	Nantong Xingdong Airport	Nantong	Jiangsu	NTG/ZSNT	249,494	27,538	6,496.7
96.	Dunhuang Airport	Dunhuang	Gansu	DNH/ZLDH	248,805	3,796	137.3
97.	Pu'er Simao Airport	Pu'er	Yunnan	SYM/ZPSM	238,486	2,572	734.4
98.	Yancheng Nanyang Airport	Yancheng	Jiangsu	YNZ/ZSYN	232,315	2,558	2,323.3
99.	Huai'an Lianshui Airport	Huai'an	Jiangsu	HIA/ZSSH	230,462	5,060	1,556.8
100.	Nanyang Jiangying Airport	Nanyang	Henan	NNY/ZHNY	227,056	16,256	677.4

=== 2010 final statistics ===
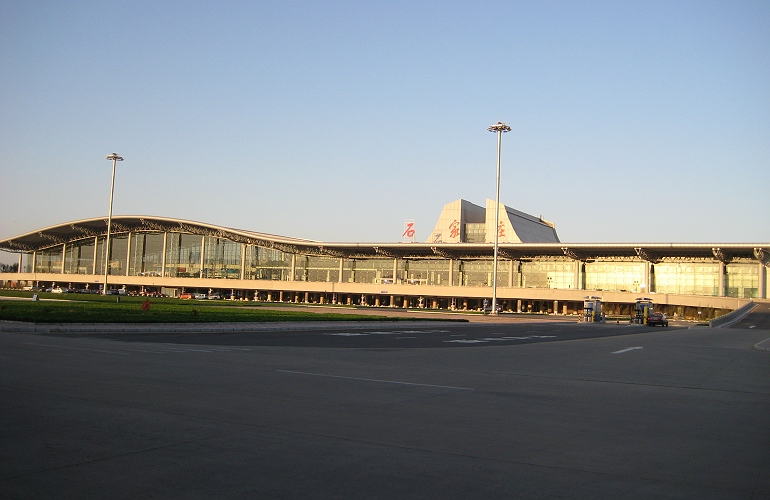
Shijiazhuang Zhengding International Airport has entered the top forty busiest airports in China in 2010, registering a record growth of 106%. Since then the airport growth has been without changes in the airport ranking.

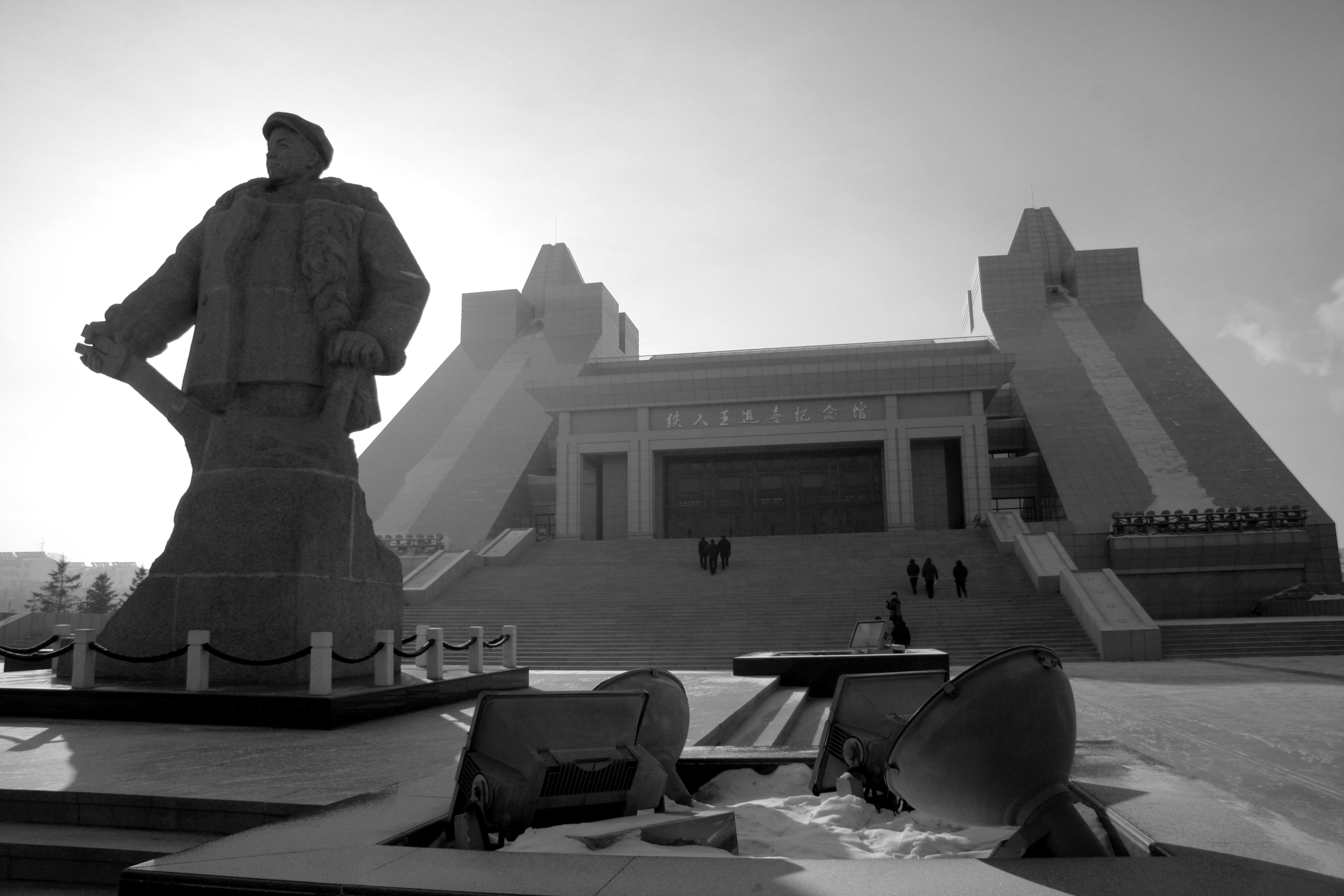
Daqing Sartu Airport, serving the "Oil Capital of China" (Wang Jinxi Memorial pictured), was the best performer during 2010, being the airport inaugurated in 2009.

The 100 busiest airports in China in 2010 ordered by total passenger traffic, according to the CAAC report.

Rank	Airport	City served	Division	IATA/ ICAO	Passengers	Aircraft	Cargo
1.	Beijing Capital International Airport	Beijing	Beijing	PEK/ZBAA	73,948,114	517,585	1,551,471.6
2.	Guangzhou Baiyun International Airport	Guangzhou	Guangdong	CAN/ZGGG	40,975,673	329,214	1,144,455.7
3.	Shanghai Pudong International Airport	Shanghai	Shanghai	PVG/ZSPD	40,578,621	332,126	3,228,080.8
4.	Shanghai Hongqiao International Airport	Shanghai	Shanghai	SHA/ZSSS	31,298,812	218,985	480,438.1
5.	Shenzhen Bao'an International Airport	Shenzhen	Guangdong	SZX/ZGSZ	26,713,610	216,897	809,125.4
6.	Chengdu Shuangliu International Airport	Chengdu	Sichuan	CTU/ZUUU	25,805,815	205,537	432,153.2
7.	Kunming Wujiaba International Airport	Kunming	Yunnan	KMG/ZPPP	20,192,243	181,466	273,651.2
8.	Xi'an Xianyang International Airport	Xi'an, Xianyang	Shaanxi	XIY/ZLXY	18,010,405	164,430	158,054.0
9.	Hangzhou Xiaoshan International Airport	Hangzhou	Zhejiang	HGH/ZSHC	17,068,585	146,289	283,426.9
10.	Chongqing Jiangbei International Airport	Chongqing	Chongqing	CKG/ZUCK	15,802,334	145,705	195,686.6
11.	Xiamen Gaoqi International Airport	Xiamen	Fujian	XMN/ZSAM	13,206,217	116,659	245,644.0
12.	Changsha Huanghua International Airport	Changsha	Hunan	CSX/ZGHA	12,621,333	115,635	108,635.2
13.	Nanjing Lukou International Airport	Nanjing	Jiangsu	NKG/ZSNJ	12,530,515	116,087	234,359.0
14.	Wuhan Tianhe International Airport	Wuhan	Hubei	WUH/ZHHH	11,646,789	112,521	110,190.8
15.	Qingdao Liuting International Airport	Qingdao	Shandong	TAO/ZSQD	11,101,176	103,975	163,748.7
16.	Dalian Zhoushuizi International Airport	Dalian	Liaoning	DLC/ZYTL	10,703,640	91,628	140,554.3
17.	Sanya Phoenix International Airport	Sanya	Hainan	SYX/ZJSY	9,293,959	70,575	45,255.6
18.	Ürümqi Diwopu International Airport	Ürümqi	Xinjiang	URC/ZWWW	9,148,329	86,491	95,124.2
19.	Haikou Meilan International Airport	Haikou	Hainan	HAK/ZJHK	8,773,771	73,824	91,667.3
20.	Zhengzhou Xinzheng International Airport	Zhengzhou	Henan	CGO/ZHCC	8,707,873	84,180	85,798.1
21.	Shenyang Taoxian International Airport	Shenyang	Liaoning	SHE/ZYTX	8,619,897	70,786	123,816.4
22.	Tianjin Binhai International Airport	Tianjin	Tianjin	TSN/ZBTJ	7,277,106	85,034	202,484.1
23.	Harbin Taiping International Airport	Harbin	Heilongjiang	HRB/ZYHB	7,259,498	61,002	71,265.2
24.	Jinan Yaoqiang International Airport	Jinan	Shandong	TNA/ZSJN	6,898,936	69,145	70,175.3
25.	Fuzhou Changle International Airport	Fuzhou	Fujian	FOC/ZSFZ	6,476,773	62,108	79,350.2
26.	Guiyang Longdongbao International Airport	Guiyang	Guizhou	KWE/ZUGY	6,271,701	61,231	61,653.0
27.	Nanning Wuxu International Airport	Nanning	Guangxi	NNG/ZGNN	5,632,933	52,396	55,633.5
28.	Wenzhou Yongqiang International Airport	Wenzhou	Zhejiang	WNZ/ZSWZ	5,326,802	49,854	50,024.2
29.	Guilin Liangjiang International Airport	Guilin	Guangxi	KWL/ZGKL	5,259,260	48,103	32,543.2
30.	Taiyuan Wusu International Airport	Taiyuan, Jinzhong	Shanxi	TYN/ZBYN	5,252,783	57,525	41,227.3
31.	Changchun Longjia International Airport	Changchun	Jilin	CGQ/ZYCC	4,749,471	42,199	61,672.4
32.	Nanchang Changbei International Airport	Nanchang	Jiangxi	KHN/ZSCN	4,748,980	51,820	32,417.8
33.	Ningbo Lishe International Airport	Ningbo	Zhejiang	NGB/ZSNB	4,517,070	39,289	55,966.6
34.	Hefei Luogang International Airport	Hefei	Anhui	HFE/ZSOF	3,817,051	46,452	31,883.0
35.	Hohhot Baita International Airport	Hohhot	Inner Mongolia	HET/ZBHH	3,663,383	43,331	20,675.3
36.	Lanzhou Zhongchuan Airport	Lanzhou	Gansu	ZGC/ZLLL	3,603,512	33,700	30,742.6
37.	Yinchuan Hedong Airport	Yinchuan	Ningxia	INC/ZLIC	2,939,822	26,334	20,343.2
38.	Shijiazhuang Zhengding International Airport	Shijiazhuang	Hebei	SJW/ZBSJ	2,723,596	51,929	25,709.8
39.	Sunan Shuofang International Airport	Wuxi, Suzhou	Jiangsu	WUX/ZSWX	2,535,277	21,978	57,070.7
40.	Yantai Laishan International Airport	Yantai	Shandong	YNT/ZSYT	2,496,318	27,932	41,514.2
41.	Lijiang Sanyi Airport	Lijiang	Yunnan	LJG/ZPLJ	2,217,824	21,085	3,058.7
42.	Beijing Nanyuan Airport	Beijing	Beijing	NAY/ZBNY	2,140,474	16,507	17,476.3
43.	Quanzhou Jinjiang Airport	Quanzhou	Fujian	JJN/ZSQZ	1,997,126	20,123	22,931.9
44.	Xishuangbanna Gasa Airport	Jinghong	Yunnan	JHG/ZPJH	1,887,362	17,772	7,400.9
45.	Zhuhai Jinwan Airport	Zhuhai	Guangdong	ZUH/ZGSD	1,819,051	37,651	17,578.8
46.	Jiuzhai Huanglong Airport	Jiuzhaigou	Sichuan	JZH/ZUJZ	1,740,728	15,126	0.0
47.	Shantou Waisha Airport	Shantou	Guangdong	SWA/ZGOW	1,727,934	16,761	10,842.5
48.	Xining Caojiabu Airport	Xining, Haidong	Qinghai	XNN/ZLXN	1,664,823	15,645	12,265.9
49.	Baotou Erliban Airport	Baotou	Inner Mongolia	BAV/ZBOW	1,332,132	11,502	6,075.1
50.	Lhasa Gonggar Airport	Lhasa, Shannan	Tibet	LXA/ZULS	1,296,328	11,720	13,827.3
51.	Zhangjiajie Hehua Airport	Zhangjiajie	Hunan	DYG/ZGDY	1,126,361	9,363	1,272.3
52.	Yanji Chaoyangchuan Airport	Yanji	Jilin	YNJ/ZYYJ	943,336	7,962	4,192.1
53.	Yulin Yuyang Airport	Yulin	Shaanxi	UYN/ZLYL	905,161	9,774	639.0
54.	Weihai Dashuibo Airport	Weihai	Shandong	WEH/ZSWH	824,938	10,579	3,751.5
55.	Ordos Ejin Horo Airport	Ordos	Inner Mongolia	DSN/ZBDS	816,737	8,862	3,074.1
56.	Kashgar Airport	Kashgar	Xinjiang	KHG/ZWSH	792,681	6,189	3,207.2
57.	Yichang Sanxia Airport	Yichang	Hubei	YIH/ZHYC	724,121	8,204	3,184.7
58.	Yiwu Airport	Yiwu	Zhejiang	YIW/ZSYW	695,148	6,148	3,802.1
59.	Beihai Fucheng Airport	Beihai	Guangxi	BHY/ZGBH	694,177	10,553	2,849.2
60.	Xuzhou Guanyin Airport	Xuzhou	Jiangsu	XUZ/ZSXZ	658,395	8,951	3,772.3
61.	Changzhou Benniu Airport	Changzhou	Jiangsu	CZX/ZSCG	658,033	6,765	6,720.0
62.	Yuncheng Zhangxiao Airport	Yuncheng	Shanxi	YCU/ZBYC	618,463	6,820	1,677.8
63.	Taizhou Luqiao Airport	Taizhou	Zhejiang	HYN/ZSLQ	616,861	6,278	5,483.4
64.	Hailar Dongshan Airport	Hailar	Inner Mongolia	HLD/ZBLA	608,804	6,202	2,130.4
65.	Wuyishan Airport	Wuyishan	Fujian	WUS/ZSWY	589,554	5,740	1,047.9
66.	Mianyang Nanjiao Airport	Mianyang	Sichuan	MIG/ZUMY	577,236	189,906	4,833.8
67.	Linyi Shubuling Airport	Linyi	Shandong	LYI/ZSLY	542,759	6,979	2,016.6
68.	Zhanjiang Airport	Zhanjiang	Guangdong	ZHA/ZGZJ	484,499	8,993	1,969.6
69.	Tengchong Tuofeng Airport	Tengchong	Yunnan	TCZ/ZUTC	465,778	5,228	538.6
70.	Yining Airport	Yining	Xinjiang	YIN/ZWYN	455,584	6,201	556.0
71.	Xichang Qingshan Airport	Xichang	Sichuan	XIC/ZUXC	445,329	4,702	2,550.8
72.	Dehong Mangshi Airport	Mangshi	Yunnan	LUM/ZPLX	443,843	4,528	3,654.1
73.	Lianyungang Baitabu Airport	Lianyungang	Jiangsu	LYG/ZSLG	423,031	5,548	1,148.7
74.	Changzhi Wangcun Airport	Changzhi	Shanxi	CIH/ZBCZ	390,379	4,982	769.7
75.	Daqing Sartu Airport	Daqing	Heilongjiang	DQA/ZYDQ	363,404	3,577	1,307.7
76.	Korla Airport	Korla	Xinjiang	KRL/ZWKL	359,137	6,360	1,131.4
77.	Zhoushan Putuoshan Airport	Zhoushan	Zhejiang	HSN/ZSZS	356,869	7,644	377.2
78.	Huangshan Tunxi International Airport	Huangshan	Anhui	TXN/ZSTX	343,033	3,752	1,499.8
79.	Liuzhou Bailian Airport	Liuzhou	Guangxi	LZH/ZGZH	321,610	3,949	3,844.4
80.	Ganzhou Huangjin Airport	Ganzhou	Jiangxi	KOW/ZSGZ	315,246	5,066	2,205.5
81.	Jingdezhen Luojia Airport	Jingdezhen	Jiangxi	JDZ/ZSJD	307,889	2,666	466.9
82.	Enshi Xujiaping Airport	Enshi	Hubei	ENH/ZHES	295,660	2,962	840.2
83.	Yibin Caiba Airport	Yibin	Sichuan	YBP/ZUYB	289,541	3,429	2,205.1
84.	Mudanjiang Hailang Airport	Mudanjiang	Heilongjiang	MDG/ZYMD	288,742	3,126	979.1
85.	Luoyang Beijiao Airport	Luoyang	Henan	LYA/ZHLY	285,774	212,738	1,170.1
86.	Nantong Xingdong Airport	Nantong	Jiangsu	NTG/ZSNT	271,440	28,435	4,654.2
87.	Chifeng Yulong Airport	Chifeng	Inner Mongolia	CIF/ZBCF	270,709	4,553	333.9
88.	Changde Taohuayuan Airport	Changde	Hunan	CGD/ZGCD	268,789	16,717	251.1
89.	Diqing Shangri-La Airport	Shangri-La	Yunnan	DIG/ZPDQ	263,323	3,440	871.9
90.	Hotan Airport	Hotan	Xinjiang	HTN/ZWTN	260,396	2,326	899.5
91.	Luzhou Lantian Airport	Luzhou	Sichuan	LZO/ZULZ	246,357	2,974	1,791.5
92.	Wanzhou Wuqiao Airport	Wanzhou	Chongqing	WXN/ZULP	244,045	4,471	2,078.1
93.	Jining Qufu Airport	Jining	Shandong	JNG/ZLJN	243,684	3,284	881.8
94.	Dali Huangcaoba Airport	Dali	Yunnan	DLU/ZPDL	227,072	2,764	465.4
95.	Aksu Onsu Airport	Aksu	Xinjiang	AKU/ZWAK	225,393	3,996	454.2
96.	Pu'er Simao Airport	Pu'er	Yunnan	SYM/ZPSM	219,689	2,628	508.0
97.	Dunhuang Airport	Dunhuang	Gansu	DNH/ZLDH	204,242	3,312	162.5
98.	Xilinhot Airport	Xilinhot	Inner Mongolia	XIL/ZBXH	201,251	3,568	214.6
99.	Qinhuangdao Shanhaiguan Airport	Qinhuangdao	Hebei	SHP/ZBSH	200,976	2,900	256.9
100.	Jiamusi Dongjiao Airport	Jiamusi	Heilongjiang	JMU/ZYJM	191,592	2,038	1,053.4

== 2000s ==
=== 2009 final statistics ===
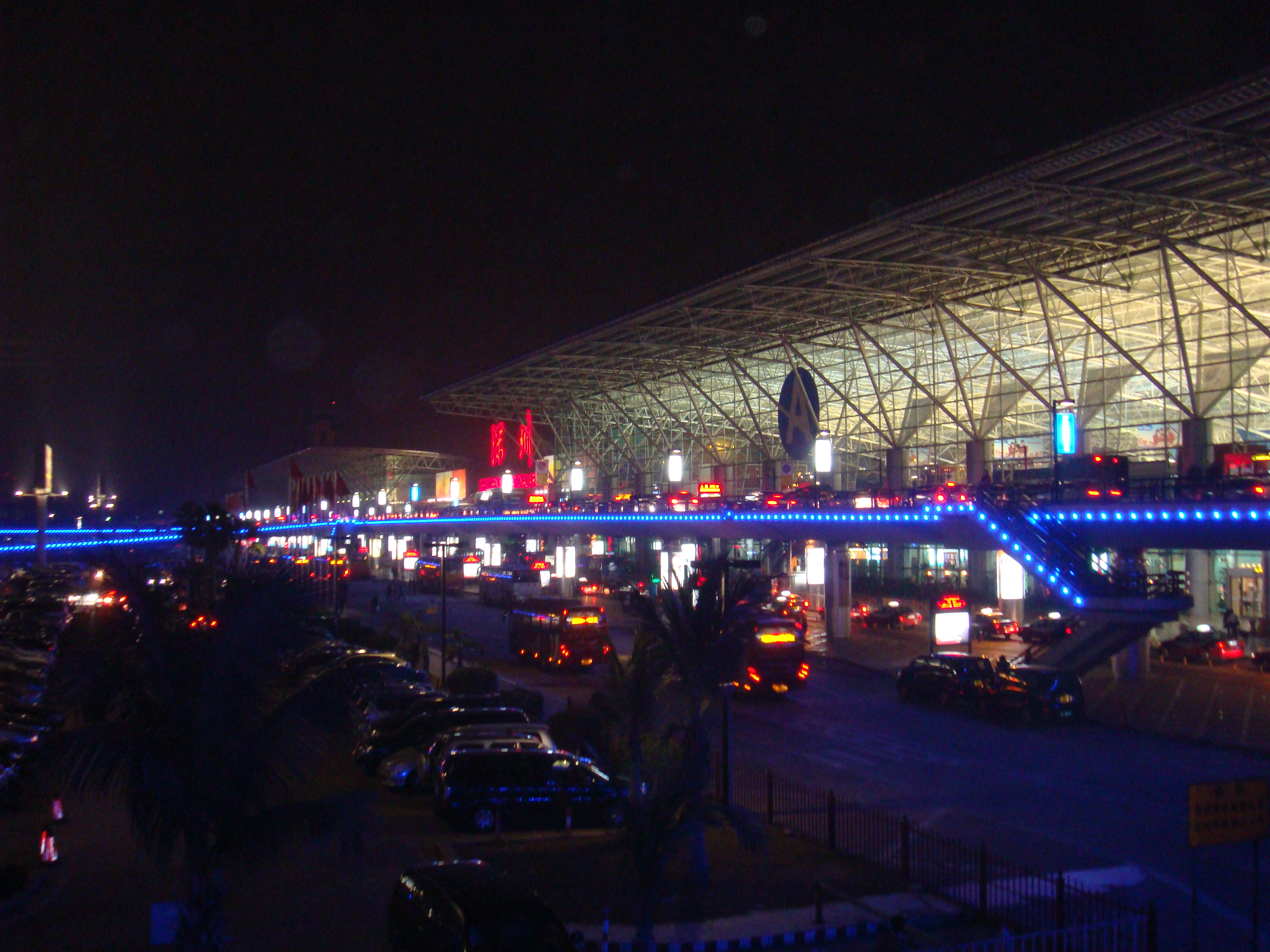
Shenzhen Baoan International Airport is sixth Chinese airport by passenger traffic and the fourth busiest by cargo movements.

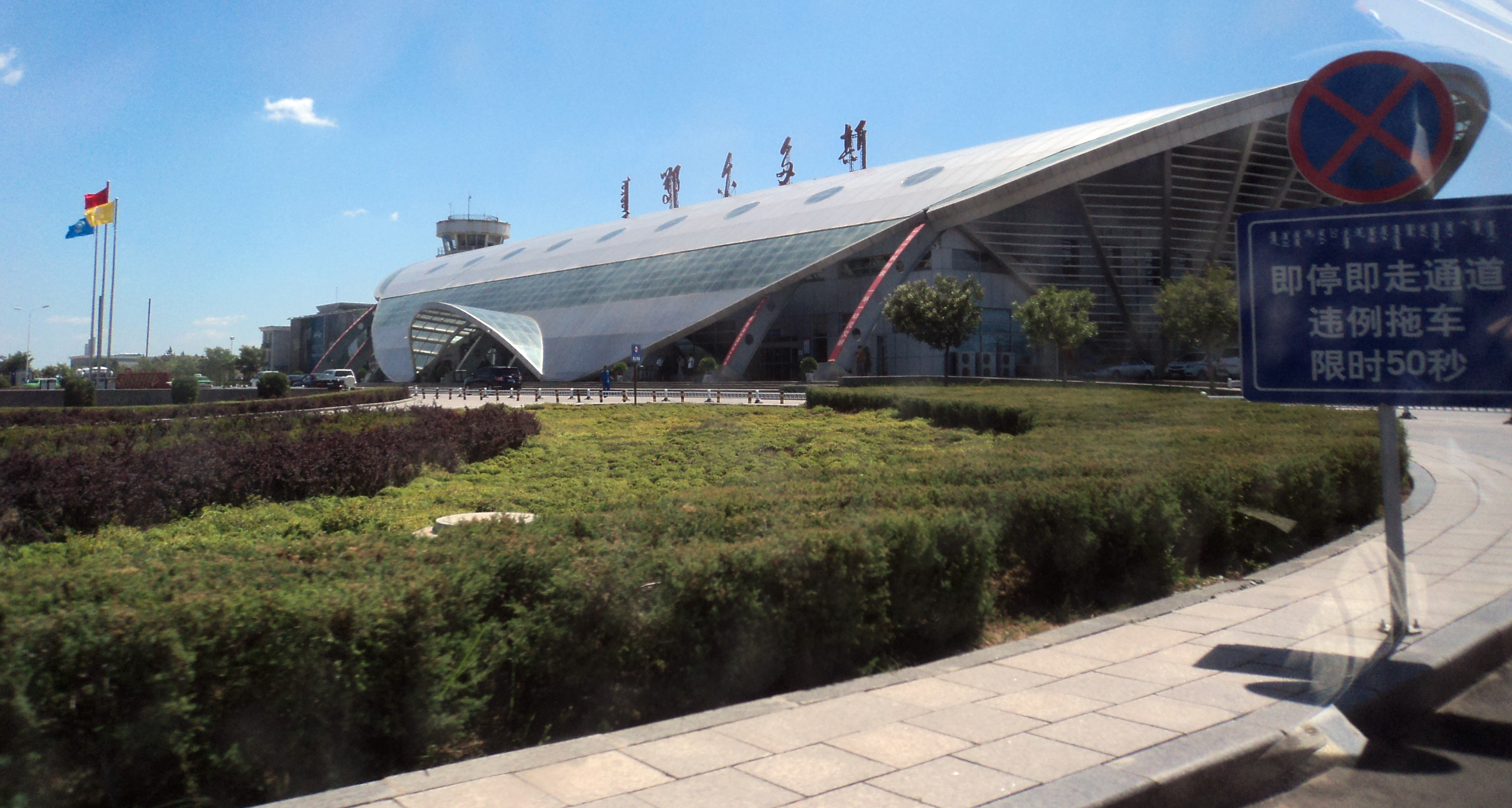
Although almost all the airports in China are continually growing in passenger traffic, Ordos Ejin Horo Airport was the only one in the top 50 that experienced a reduction in its passenger flow in 2013 (-4%).

The 100 busiest airports in China in 2009 ordered by total passenger traffic, according to the CAAC report.

Rank	Airport	City served	Division	IATA/ ICAO	Passengers	Aircraft	Cargo
1.	Beijing Capital International Airport	Beijing	Beijing	PEK/ZBAA	65,375,095	487,918	1,475,656.8
2.	Guangzhou Baiyun International Airport	Guangzhou	Guangdong	CAN/ZGGG	37,048,712	308,863	955,269.7
3.	Shanghai Pudong International Airport	Shanghai	Shanghai	PVG/ZSPD	31,921,009	287,916	2,543,393.6
4.	Shanghai Hongqiao International Airport	Shanghai	Shanghai	SHA/ZSSS	25,078,548	189,071	439,071.9
5.	Shenzhen Bao'an International Airport	Shenzhen	Guangdong	SZX/ZGSZ	24,486,406	202,627	605,469.2
6.	Chengdu Shuangliu International Airport	Chengdu	Sichuan	CTU/ZUUU	22,637,762	190,094	373,515.0
7.	Kunming Wujiaba International Airport	Kunming	Yunnan	KMG/ZPPP	18,944,716	172,572	258,755.3
8.	Xi'an Xianyang International Airport	Xi'an, Xianyang	Shaanxi	XIY/ZLXY	15,294,948	146,272	127,000.2
9.	Hangzhou Xiaoshan International Airport	Hangzhou	Zhejiang	HGH/ZSHC	14,944,716	134,058	226,307.9
10.	Chongqing Jiangbei International Airport	Chongqing	Chongqing	CKG/ZUCK	14,038,045	132,619	186,005.9
11.	Xiamen Gaoqi International Airport	Xiamen	Fujian	XMN/ZSAM	11,327,870	105,939	196,025.1
12.	Wuhan Tianhe International Airport	Wuhan	Hubei	WUH/ZHHH	11,303,767	113,332	101,874.7
13.	Changsha Huanghua International Airport	Changsha	Hunan	CSX/ZGHA	11,284,282	110,023	86,995.0
14.	Nanjing Lukou International Airport	Nanjing	Jiangsu	NKG/ZSNJ	10,837,222	106,142	200,099.0
15.	Qingdao Liuting International Airport	Qingdao	Shandong	TAO/ZSQD	9,660,129	98,033	135,364.4
16.	Dalian Zhoushuizi International Airport	Dalian	Liaoning	DLC/ZYTL	9,550,365	85,390	125,832.0
17.	Haikou Meilan International Airport	Haikou	Hainan	HAK/ZJHK	8,390,478	69,114	77,779.6
18.	Sanya Phoenix International Airport	Sanya	Hainan	SYX/ZJSY	7,941,345	59,811	38,396.9
19.	Shenyang Taoxian International Airport	Shenyang	Liaoning	SHE/ZYTX	7,504,828	67,027	112,444.6
20.	Zhengzhou Xinzheng International Airport	Zhengzhou	Henan	CGO/ZHCC	7,342,427	75,743	70,533.0
21.	Ürümqi Diwopu International Airport	Ürümqi	Xinjiang	URC/ZWWW	6,575,375	65,511	77,632.3
22.	Harbin Taiping International Airport	Harbin	Heilongjiang	HRB/ZYHB	6,558,796	57,440	66,152.0
23.	Jinan Yaoqiang International Airport	Jinan	Shandong	TNA/ZSJN	5,852,871	63,602	56,596.6
24.	Tianjin Binhai International Airport	Tianjin	Tianjin	TSN/ZBTJ	5,780,281	75,116	168,103.1
25.	Guiyang Longdongbao International Airport	Guiyang	Guizhou	KWE/ZUGY	5,687,652	57,354	51,619.0
26.	Fuzhou Changle International Airport	Fuzhou	Fujian	FOC/ZSFZ	5,451,196	51,575	64,400.9
27.	Guilin Liangjiang International Airport	Guilin	Guangxi	KWL/ZGKL	5,319,362	49,525	29,636.2
28.	Wenzhou Yongqiang International Airport	Wenzhou	Zhejiang	WNZ/ZSWZ	4,821,527	44,800	44,326.0
29.	Taiyuan Wusu International Airport	Taiyuan, Jinzhong	Shanxi	TYN/ZBYN	4,632,179	52,236	34,495.7
30.	Nanning Wuxu International Airport	Nanning	Guangxi	NNG/ZGNN	4,520,212	44,597	46,268.7
31.	Ningbo Lishe International Airport	Ningbo	Zhejiang	NGB/ZSNB	4,031,447	37,512	46,839.7
32.	Nanchang Changbei International Airport	Nanchang	Jiangxi	KHN/ZSCN	3,937,897	48,050	24,524.4
33.	Changchun Longjia International Airport	Changchun	Jilin	CGQ/ZYCC	3,878,416	35,909	48,085.3
34.	Hefei Luogang International Airport	Hefei	Anhui	HFE/ZSOF	3,205,694	35,814	28,115.8
35.	Hohhot Baita International Airport	Hohhot	Inner Mongolia	HET/ZBHH	2,898,661	33,190	14,513.2
36.	Lanzhou Zhongchuan Airport	Lanzhou	Gansu	LHW/ZLLL	2,861,507	28,353	27,021.2
37.	Yinchuan Hedong Airport	Yinchuan	Ningxia	INC/ZLIC	2,305,930	21,393	15,127.5
38.	Lijiang Sanyi Airport	Lijiang	Yunnan	LJG/ZPLJ	2,295,323	22,143	1,674.8
39.	Wuxi Shuofang Airport	Wuxi	Jiangsu	WUX/ZSWX	2,217,932	19,723	47,021.3
40.	Yantai Laishan International Airport	Yantai	Shandong	YNT/ZSYT	2,094,804	25,830	29,189.6
41.	Xishuangbanna Gasa Airport	Jinghong	Yunnan	JHG/ZPJH	1,942,323	18,193	6,664.9
42.	Jiuzhai Huanglong Airport	Jiuzhaigou	Sichuan	JZH/ZUJZ	1,749,316	13,411	0.0
43.	Quanzhou Jinjiang Airport	Quanzhou	Fujian	JJN/ZSQZ	1,655,986	16,842	13,792.3
44.	Beijing Nanyuan Airport	Beijing	Beijing	NAY/ZBNY	1,607,595	13,252	12,528.0
45.	Zhuhai Jinwan Airport	Zhuhai	Guangdong	ZUH/ZGSD	1,385,858	23,149	13,759.6
46.	Xining Caojiabu Airport	Xining, Haidong	Qinghai	XNN/ZLXN	1,351,759	12,326	7,458.7
47.	Shijiazhuang Zhengding International Airport	Shijiazhuang	Hebei	SJW/ZBSJ	1,320,241	32,481	18,672.3
48.	Shantou Waisha Airport	Shantou	Guangdong	SWA/ZGOW	1,266,407	13,517	9,088.7
49.	Zhangjiajie Hehua Airport	Zhangjiajie	Hunan	DYG/ZGDY	1,201,976	10,760	1,633.1
50.	Lhasa Gonggar Airport	Lhasa, Shannan	Tibet	LXA/ZULS	1,121,613	10,064	12,872.6
51.	Baotou Erliban Airport	Baotou	Inner Mongolia	BAV/ZBOW	1,070,122	10,099	4,678.6
52.	Yanji Chaoyangchuan Airport	Yanji	Jilin	YNJ/ZYYJ	808,256	7,457	3,126.4
53.	Weihai Dashuibo Airport	Weihai	Shandong	WEH/ZSWH	675,451	9,850	3,003.4
54.	Yichang Sanxia Airport	Yichang	Hubei	YIH/ZHYC	657,507	9,082	3,498.4
55.	Yulin Yuyang Airport	Yulin	Shaanxi	UYN/ZLYL	631,769	6,675	327.4
56.	Kashgar Airport	Kashgar	Xinjiang	KHG/ZWSH	574,485	5,093	2,445.4
57.	Yiwu Airport	Yiwu	Zhejiang	YIW/ZSYW	559,652	5,322	3,259.4
58.	Wuyishan Airport	Wuyishan	Fujian	WUS/ZSWY	535,713	5,235	799.7
59.	Changzhou Benniu Airport	Changzhou	Jiangsu	CZX/ZSCG	535,198	5,800	6,173.3
60.	Hailar Dongshan Airport	Hailar	Inner Mongolia	HLD/ZBLA	532,463	5,642	1,094.5
61.	Taizhou Luqiao Airport	Taizhou	Zhejiang	HYN/ZSLQ	526,738	5,340	4,293.2
62.	Xuzhou Guanyin Airport	Xuzhou	Jiangsu	XUZ/ZSXZ	511,469	9,065	3,251.0
63.	Yuncheng Zhangxiao Airport	Yuncheng	Shanxi	YCU/ZBYC	506,642	6,116	1,024.1
64.	Beihai Fucheng Airport	Beihai	Guangxi	BHY/ZGBH	505,440	5,357	1,130.6
65.	Enshi Xujiaping Airport	Enshi	Hubei	ENH/ZHES	472,839	5,637	948.1
66.	Ordos Ejin Horo Airport	Ordos	Inner Mongolia	DSN/ZBDS	472,656	5,588	1,823.2
67.	Zhoushan Putuoshan Airport	Zhoushan	Zhejiang	HSN/ZSZS	447,956	6,416	434.7
68.	Zhanjiang Airport	Zhanjiang	Guangdong	ZHA/ZGZJ	396,263	5,213	1,590.3
69.	Dehong Mangshi Airport	Mangshi	Yunnan	LUM/ZPLX	380,265	3,870	2,888.1
70.	Xichang Qingshan Airport	Xichang	Sichuan	XIC/ZUXC	374,504	4,134	2,037.3
71.	Changzhi Wangcun Airport	Changzhi	Shanxi	CIH/ZBCZ	340,613	4,595	466.3
72.	Liuzhou Bailian Airport	Liuzhou	Guangxi	LZH/ZGZH	309,354	4,083	3,285.6
73.	Linyi Shubuling Airport	Linyi	Shandong	LYI/ZSLY	301,341	26,241	1,163.4
74.	Lianyungang Baitabu Airport	Lianyungang	Jiangsu	LYG/ZSLG	291,059	3,747	944.8
75.	Huangshan Tunxi International Airport	Huangshan	Anhui	TXN/ZSTX	285,179	3,396	963.3
76.	Mianyang Nanjiao Airport	Mianyang	Sichuan	MIG/ZUMY	280,903	2,897	3,812.2
77.	Korla Airport	Korla	Xinjiang	KRL/ZWKL	270,657	5,371	564.3
78.	Mudanjiang Hailang Airport	Mudanjiang	Heilongjiang	MDG/ZYMD	260,063	3,414	759.8
79.	Tengchong Tuofeng Airport	Tengchong	Yunnan	TCZ/ZUTC	257,637	3,016	134.4
80.	Jingdezhen Luojia Airport	Jingdezhen	Jiangxi	JDZ/ZSJD	242,753	2,308	307.7
81.	Changde Taohuayuan Airport	Changde	Hunan	CGD/ZGCD	236,263	2,930	110.1
82.	Luoyang Beijiao Airport	Luoyang	Henan	LYA/ZHLY	231,968	212,008	1,239.8
83.	Diqing Shangri-La Airport	Shangri-La	Yunnan	DIG/ZPDQ	221,331	2,904	697.5
84.	Nantong Xingdong Airport	Nantong	Jiangsu	NTG/ZSNT	220,260	30,634	1,877.7
85.	Yibin Caiba Airport	Yibin	Sichuan	YBP/ZUYB	211,197	2,468	2,008.0
86.	Dali Huangcaoba Airport	Dali	Yunnan	DLU/ZPDL	210,475	2,688	361.2
87.	Wanzhou Wuqiao Airport	Wanzhou	Chongqing	WXN/ZULP	209,154	3,202	1,623.9
88.	Luzhou Lantian Airport	Luzhou	Sichuan	LZO/ZULZ	203,567	2,854	1,663.2
89.	Yining Airport	Yining	Xinjiang	YIN/ZWYN	202,130	3,555	353.1
90.	Pu'er Simao Airport	Pu'er	Yunnan	SYM/ZPSM	191,090	2,002	215.0
91.	Ganzhou Huangjin Airport	Ganzhou	Jiangxi	KOW/ZSGZ	189,105	4,241	1,459.7
92.	Hotan Airport	Hotan	Xinjiang	HTN/ZWTN	188,434	1,728	771.5
93.	Panzhihua Bao'anying Airport	Panzhihua	Sichuan	PZI/ZUZH	177,234	1,858	2,378.5
94.	Aksu Onsu Airport	Aksu	Xinjiang	AKU/ZWAK	170,488	3,996	247.0
95.	Jiamusi Dongjiao Airport	Jiamusi	Heilongjiang	JMU/ZYJM	166,048	1,970	517.7
96.	Chifeng Yulong Airport	Chifeng	Inner Mongolia	CIF/ZBCF	165,202	3,243	212.5
97.	Yancheng Nanyang Airport	Yancheng	Jiangsu	YNZ/ZSYN	161,682	2,216	1,211.5
98.	Dunhuang Airport	Dunhuang	Gansu	DNH/ZLDH	152,556	2,569	108.5
99.	Manzhouli Airport	Manzhouli	Inner Mongolia	NZH/ZBMZ	146,901	1,872	582.7
100.	Dazhou Heshi Airport	Dazhou	Sichuan	DAX/ZUDX	144,383	1,728	1,188.2

=== 2008 final statistics ===
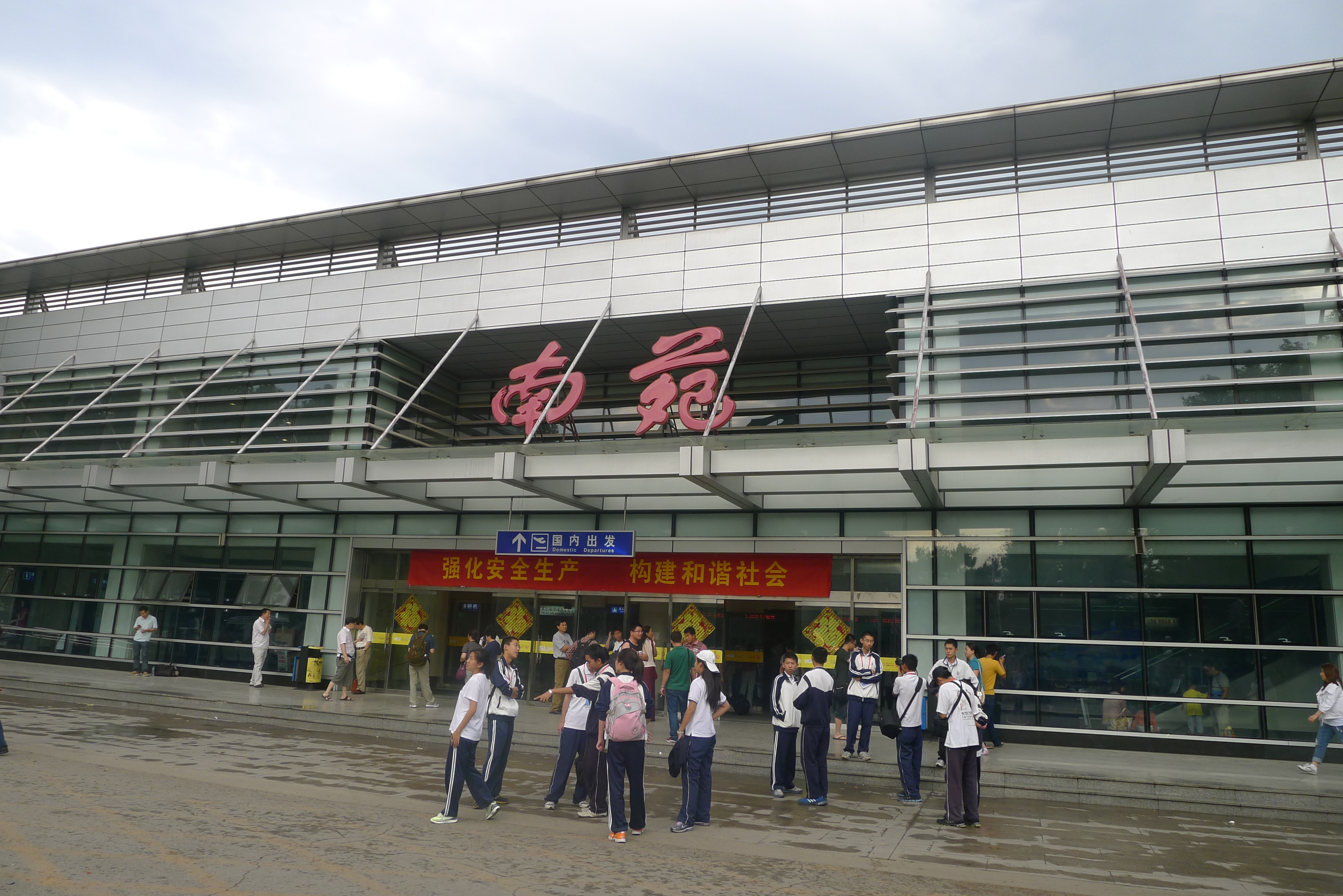
Amazing performance of Beijing Nanyuan Airport in 2013. Although the airport will be closed when the new mega-airport in Beijing will open in 2018, Nanyuan continues to grow and last year jumped four position from 42nd to the 38th busiest airport in China.

The 100 busiest airports in China in 2008 ordered by total passenger traffic, according to the CAAC report.

Rank	Airport	City served	Division	IATA/ ICAO	Passengers	Aircraft	Cargo
1.	Beijing Capital International Airport	Beijing	Beijing	PEK/ZBAA	55,938,136	429,646	1,367,710.3
2.	Guangzhou Baiyun International Airport	Guangzhou	Guangdong	CAN/ZGGG	33,435,472	280,392	685,867.9
3.	Shanghai Pudong International Airport	Shanghai	Shanghai	PVG/ZSPD	28,235,691	265,735	2,603,027.0
4.	Shanghai Hongqiao International Airport	Shanghai	Shanghai	SHA/ZSSS	22,877,404	185,304	415,726.3
5.	Shenzhen Bao'an International Airport	Shenzhen	Guangdong	SZX/ZGSZ	21,400,509	187,942	598,036.4
6.	Chengdu Shuangliu International Airport	Chengdu	Sichuan	CTU/ZUUU	17,246,806	158,615	373,067.3
7.	Kunming Wujiaba International Airport	Kunming	Yunnan	KMG/ZPPP	15,877,814	150,353	236,347.7
8.	Hangzhou Xiaoshan International Airport	Hangzhou	Zhejiang	HGH/ZSHC	12,673,198	118,560	210,793.0
9.	Xi'an Xianyang International Airport	Xi'an, Xianyang	Shaanxi	XIY/ZLXY	11,921,919	121,992	117,084.5
10.	Chongqing Jiangbei International Airport	Chongqing	Chongqing	CKG/ZUCK	11,138,432	112,565	160,256.4
11.	Xiamen Gaoqi International Airport	Xiamen	Fujian	XMN/ZSAM	9,385,436	92,785	195,462.9
12.	Wuhan Tianhe International Airport	Wuhan	Hubei	WUH/ZHHH	9,202,629	98,372	89,852.8
13.	Nanjing Lukou International Airport	Nanjing	Jiangsu	NKG/ZSNJ	8,881,261	91,242	187,604.1
14.	Changsha Huanghua International Airport	Changsha	Hunan	CSX/ZGHA	8,454,808	85,339	71,151.9
15.	Haikou Meilan International Airport	Haikou	Hainan	HAK/ZJHK	8,221,997	66,411	74,062.5
16.	Dalian Zhoushuizi International Airport	Dalian	Liaoning	DLC/ZYTL	8,205,454	73,082	129,388.1
17.	Qingdao Liuting International Airport	Qingdao	Shandong	TAO/ZSQD	8,200,367	87,828	130,450.2
18.	Shenyang Taoxian International Airport	Shenyang	Liaoning	SHE/ZYTX	6,807,235	62,531	102,487.5
19.	Sanya Phoenix International Airport	Sanya	Hainan	SYX/ZJSY	6,006,300	47,373	29,298.9
20.	Zhengzhou Xinzheng International Airport	Zhengzhou	Henan	CGO/ZHCC	5,887,598	62,288	64,655.3
21.	Ürümqi Diwopu International Airport	Ürümqi	Xinjiang	URC/ZWWW	5,817,274	59,462	77,748.1
22.	Harbin Taiping International Airport	Harbin	Heilongjiang	HRB/ZYHB	4,985,212	46,364	58,695.3
23.	Jinan Yaoqiang International Airport	Jinan	Shandong	TNA/ZSJN	4,828,746	52,557	48,875.3
24.	Tianjin Binhai International Airport	Tianjin	Tianjin	TSN/ZBTJ	4,637,299	70,279	166,558.1
25.	Fuzhou Changle International Airport	Fuzhou	Fujian	FOC/ZSFZ	4,533,889	45,336	60,152.5
26.	Guiyang Longdongbao International Airport	Guiyang	Guizhou	KWE/ZUGY	4,324,085	46,259	41,967.9
27.	Taiyuan Wusu International Airport	Taiyuan, Jinzhong	Shanxi	TYN/ZBYN	4,312,910	47,909	31,511.4
28.	Guilin Liangjiang International Airport	Guilin	Guangxi	KWL/ZGKL	4,259,410	42,919	27,419.4
29.	Wenzhou Yongqiang International Airport	Wenzhou	Zhejiang	WNZ/ZSWZ	3,976,546	38,697	36,847.7
30.	Ningbo Lishe International Airport	Ningbo	Zhejiang	NGB/ZSNB	3,574,352	34,002	39,768.8
31.	Nanning Wuxu International Airport	Nanning	Guangxi	NNG/ZGNN	3,394,846	35,718	37,637.8
32.	Nanchang Changbei International Airport	Nanchang	Jiangxi	KHN/ZSCN	3,331,776	34,292	23,571.2
33.	Changchun Longjia International Airport	Changchun	Jilin	CGQ/ZYCC	3,049,767	29,366	36,511.1
34.	Hefei Luogang International Airport	Hefei	Anhui	HFE/ZSOF	2,525,294	32,141	23,844.0
35.	Lanzhou Zhongchuan Airport	Lanzhou	Gansu	LHW/ZLLL	2,212,306	23,897	21,747.9
36.	Hohhot Baita International Airport	Hohhot	Inner Mongolia	HET/ZBHH	2,121,905	26,529	13,310.7
37.	Lijiang Sanyi Airport	Lijiang	Yunnan	LJG/ZPLJ	1,881,745	19,428	1,279.5
38.	Yantai Laishan International Airport	Yantai	Shandong	YNT/ZSYT	1,707,498	23,595	25,207.6
39.	Wuxi Shuofang Airport	Wuxi	Jiangsu	WUX/ZSWX	1,642,497	16,380	39,569.2
40.	Yinchuan Hedong Airport	Yinchuan	Ningxia	INC/ZLIC	1,642,342	17,111	11,734.8
41.	Xishuangbanna Gasa Airport	Jinghong	Yunnan	JHG/ZPJH	1,637,454	15,872	5,192.4
42.	Quanzhou Jinjiang Airport	Quanzhou	Fujian	JJN/ZSQZ	1,401,958	14,677	11,213.7
43.	Beijing Nanyuan Airport	Beijing	Beijing	NAY/ZBNY	1,357,038	12,245	13,243.0
44.	Zhuhai Jinwan Airport	Zhuhai	Guangdong	ZUH/ZGSD	1,121,831	30,430	11,139.3
45.	Shantou Waisha Airport	Shantou	Guangdong	SWA/ZGOW	1,091,095	11,753	8,491.4
46.	Shijiazhuang Zhengding International Airport	Shijiazhuang	Hebei	SJW/ZBSJ	1,043,688	28,953	15,343.9
47.	Zhangjiajie Hehua Airport	Zhangjiajie	Hunan	DYG/ZGDY	1,019,961	10,396	1,163.2
48.	Xining Caojiabu Airport	Xining, Haidong	Qinghai	XNN/ZLXN	951,330	9,455	6,691.4
49.	Yanji Chaoyangchuan Airport	Yanji	Jilin	YNJ/ZYYJ	790,885	7,638	2,847.6
50.	Baotou Erliban Airport	Baotou	Inner Mongolia	BAV/ZBOW	753,293	6,989	4,517.8
51.	Lhasa Gonggar Airport	Lhasa, Shannan	Tibet	LXA/ZULS	699,876	7,074	9,755.7
52.	Jiuzhai Huanglong Airport	Jiuzhaigou	Sichuan	JZH/ZUJZ	660,384	9,132	0.0
53.	Weihai Dashuibo Airport	Weihai	Shandong	WEH/ZSWH	651,270	9,657	3,238.7
54.	Wuyishan Airport	Wuyishan	Fujian	WUS/ZSWY	565,115	6,171	883.7
55.	Changzhou Benniu Airport	Changzhou	Jiangsu	CZX/ZSCG	550,808	6,096	6,393.4
56.	Yichang Sanxia Airport	Yichang	Hubei	YIH/ZHYC	523,234	7,519	2,676.0
57.	Yiwu Airport	Yiwu	Zhejiang	YIW/ZSYW	516,325	5,316	3,346.9
58.	Kashgar Airport	Kashgar	Xinjiang	KHG/ZWSH	427,577	3,682	1,832.9
59.	Taizhou Luqiao Airport	Taizhou	Zhejiang	HYN/ZSLQ	407,698	4,580	3,234.9
60.	Xuzhou Guanyin Airport	Xuzhou	Jiangsu	XUZ/ZSXZ	401,046	8,424	2,561.2
61.	Zhoushan Putuoshan Airport	Zhoushan	Zhejiang	HSN/ZSZS	355,645	5,322	321.9
62.	Dehong Mangshi Airport	Mangshi	Yunnan	LUM/ZPLX	354,574	3,671	2,668.5
63.	Hailar Dongshan Airport	Hailar	Inner Mongolia	HLD/ZBLA	342,416	4,382	1,298.5
64.	Enshi Xujiaping Airport	Enshi	Hubei	ENH/ZHES	318,833	3,548	460.6
65.	Ordos Ejin Horo Airport	Ordos	Inner Mongolia	DSN/ZBDS	307,513	3,552	1,084.9
66.	Yuncheng Zhangxiao Airport	Yuncheng	Shanxi	YCU/ZBYC	303,571	4,718	715.1
67.	Zhanjiang Airport	Zhanjiang	Guangdong	ZHA/ZGZJ	302,837	4,685	1,329.7
68.	Dali Huangcaoba Airport	Dali	Yunnan	DLU/ZPDL	290,255	3,516	556.7
69.	Beihai Fucheng Airport	Beihai	Guangxi	BHY/ZGBH	267,168	3,165	837.3
70.	Liuzhou Bailian Airport	Liuzhou	Guangxi	LZH/ZGZH	265,004	4,314	2,754.9
71.	Yining Airport	Yining	Xinjiang	YIN/ZWYN	264,124	5,189	450.1
72.	Xichang Qingshan Airport	Xichang	Sichuan	XIC/ZUXC	263,153	2,925	1,494.0
73.	Changzhi Wangcun Airport	Changzhi	Shanxi	CIH/ZBCZ	260,828	3,534	229.6
74.	Yulin Yuyang Airport	Yulin	Shaanxi	UYN/ZLYL	236,815	4,506	134.4
75.	Linyi Shubuling Airport	Linyi	Shandong	LYI/ZSLY	230,577	9,172	729.9
76.	Huangshan Tunxi International Airport	Huangshan	Anhui	TXN/ZSTX	227,471	2,718	636.9
77.	Panzhihua Bao'anying Airport	Panzhihua	Sichuan	PZI/ZUZH	211,069	2,595	2,150.4
78.	Lianyungang Baitabu Airport	Lianyungang	Jiangsu	LYG/ZSLG	208,630	3,216	993.4
79.	Mianyang Nanjiao Airport	Mianyang	Sichuan	MIG/ZUMY	208,442	2,426	3,805.8
80.	Korla Airport	Korla	Xinjiang	KRL/ZWKL	200,830	4,420	277.3
81.	Jingdezhen Luojia Airport	Jingdezhen	Jiangxi	JDZ/ZSJD	189,256	2,424	119.8
82.	Luoyang Beijiao Airport	Luoyang	Henan	LYA/ZHLY	182,879	212,568	795.7
83.	Yibin Caiba Airport	Yibin	Sichuan	YBP/ZUYB	177,596	2,152	1,771.6
84.	Luzhou Lantian Airport	Luzhou	Sichuan	LZO/ZULZ	163,736	2,633	1,529.1
85.	Diqing Shangri-La Airport	Shangri-La	Yunnan	DIG/ZPDQ	161,476	2,093	540.7
86.	Nantong Xingdong Airport	Nantong	Jiangsu	NTG/ZSNT	161,365	22,954	1,841.7
87.	Mudanjiang Hailang Airport	Mudanjiang	Heilongjiang	MDG/ZYMD	160,932	2,007	536.0
88.	Changde Taohuayuan Airport	Changde	Hunan	CGD/ZGCD	157,789	2,259	77.6
89.	Baoshan Airport	Baoshan	Yunnan	BSD/ZPBS	149,792	1,618	186.6
90.	Hotan Airport	Hotan	Xinjiang	HTN/ZWTN	146,008	1,470	459.8
91.	Pu'er Simao Airport	Pu'er	Yunnan	SYM/ZPSM	135,888	1,934	44.0
92.	Dunhuang Airport	Dunhuang	Gansu	DNH/ZLDH	134,062	2,361	101.6
93.	Wanzhou Wuqiao Airport	Wanzhou	Chongqing	WXN/ZULP	126,696	1,740	693.7
94.	Manzhouli Airport	Manzhouli	Inner Mongolia	NZH/ZBMZ	122,727	1,649	575.7
95.	Ganzhou Huangjin Airport	Ganzhou	Jiangxi	KOW/ZSGZ	120,497	3,308	810.2
96.	Datong Beijiazao Airport	Datong	Shanxi	DAT/ZBDT	117,423	1,882	214.2
97.	Altay Airport	Altay	Xinjiang	AAT/ZWAT	116,275	2,386	19.3
98.	Lincang Airport	Lincang	Yunnan	LNJ/ZPLC	114,892	1,414	329.3
99.	Jiamusi Dongjiao Airport	Jiamusi	Heilongjiang	JMU/ZYJM	111,044	1,134	225.9
100.	Dazhou Heshi Airport	Dazhou	Sichuan	DAX/ZUDX	108,149	1,422	457.6

=== 2007 final statistics ===
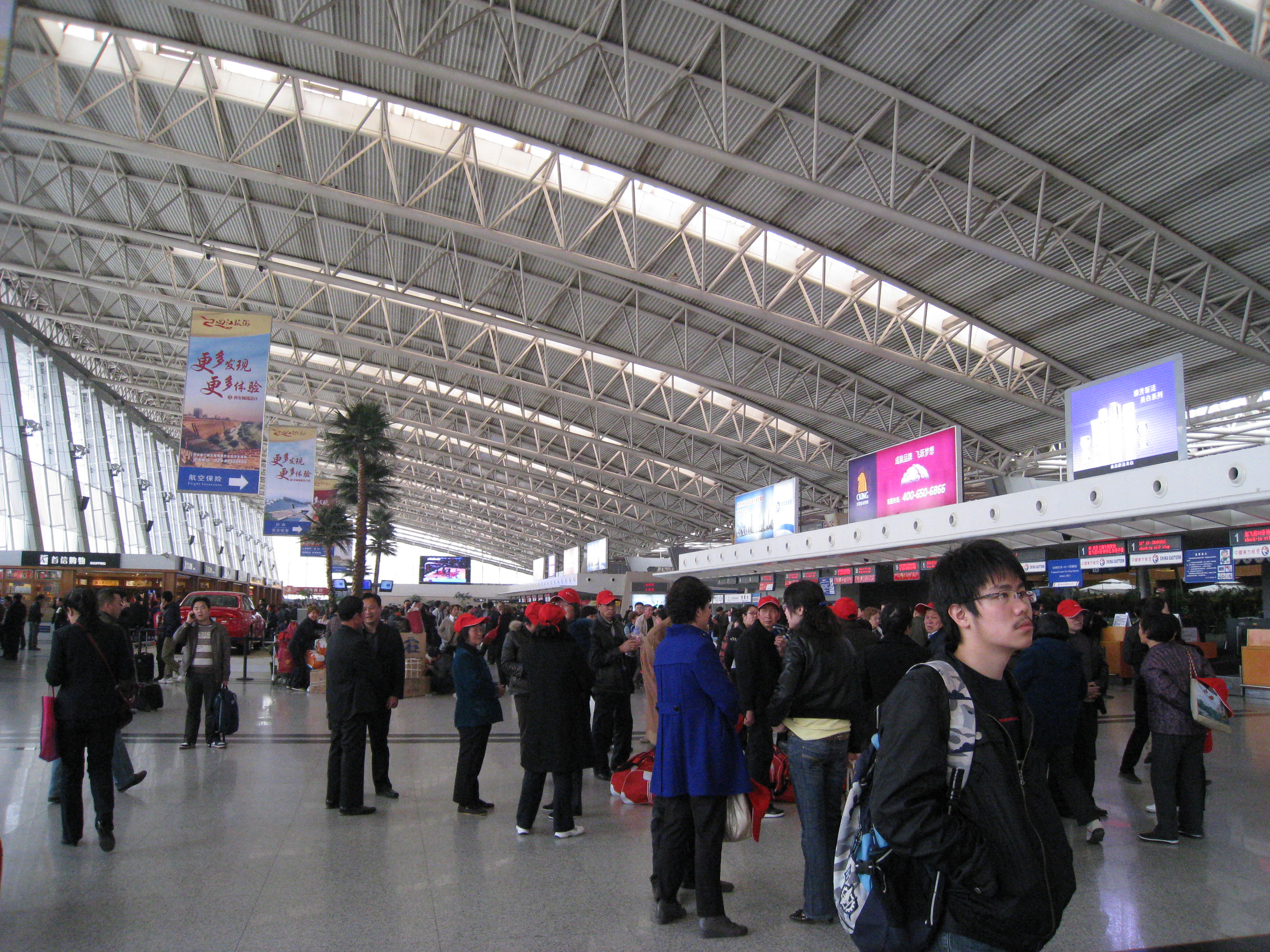
Xi'an Xianyang International Airport strengthened its position as the eight busiest airport in China. In 2013 the airport surpassed the 25-million passenger mark.

The 100 busiest airports in China in 2007 ordered by total passenger traffic, according to the CAAC report.

Rank	Airport	City served	Division	IATA/ ICAO	Passengers	Aircraft	Cargo
1.	Beijing Capital International Airport	Beijing	Beijing	PEK/ZBAA	53,611,747	399,209	1,416,211.3
2.	Guangzhou Baiyun International Airport	Guangzhou	Guangdong	CAN/ZGGG	30,958,467	260,828	694,926.0
3.	Shanghai Pudong International Airport	Shanghai	Shanghai	PVG/ZSPD	28,920,432	253,532	2,559,098.2
4.	Shanghai Hongqiao International Airport	Shanghai	Shanghai	SHA/ZSSS	22,632,962	187,045	388,812.1
5.	Shenzhen Bao'an International Airport	Shenzhen	Guangdong	SZX/ZGSZ	20,619,164	181,450	616,046.4
6.	Chengdu Shuangliu International Airport	Chengdu	Sichuan	CTU/ZUUU	18,574,284	166,312	325,856.3
7.	Kunming Wujiaba International Airport	Kunming	Yunnan	KMG/ZPPP	15,725,791	148,128	232,588.9
8.	Hangzhou Xiaoshan International Airport	Hangzhou	Zhejiang	HGH/ZSHC	11,729,983	114,672	195,644.6
9.	Xi'an Xianyang International Airport	Xi'an, Xianyang	Shaanxi	XIY/ZLXY	11,372,630	119,341	111,981.6
10.	Chongqing Jiangbei International Airport	Chongqing	Chongqing	CKG/ZUCK	10,355,730	105,092	143,472.4
11.	Xiamen Gaoqi International Airport	Xiamen	Fujian	XMN/ZSAM	8,684,662	85,251	193,574.0
12.	Wuhan Tianhe International Airport	Wuhan	Hubei	WUH/ZHHH	8,356,340	93,498	89,531.0
13.	Changsha Huanghua International Airport	Changsha	Hunan	CSX/ZGHA	8,069,989	82,041	68,629.7
14.	Nanjing Lukou International Airport	Nanjing	Jiangsu	NKG/ZSNJ	8,037,189	82,392	180,401.1
15.	Qingdao Liuting International Airport	Qingdao	Shandong	TAO/ZSQD	7,867,982	82,367	115,732.0
16.	Dalian Zhoushuizi International Airport	Dalian	Liaoning	DLC/ZYTL	7,281,084	63,416	121,661.7
17.	Haikou Meilan International Airport	Haikou	Hainan	HAK/ZJHK	7,265,349	60,579	69,790.5
18.	Shenyang Taoxian International Airport	Shenyang	Liaoning	SHE/ZYTX	6,190,448	56,879	97,368.2
19.	Ürümqi Diwopu International Airport	Ürümqi	Xinjiang	URC/ZWWW	6,169,981	59,284	85,213.6
20.	Sanya Phoenix International Airport	Sanya	Hainan	SYX/ZJSY	5,311,622	42,292	28,620.7
21.	Zhengzhou Xinzheng International Airport	Zhengzhou	Henan	CGO/ZHCC	5,002,102	54,470	65,558.0
22.	Guilin Liangjiang International Airport	Guilin	Guangxi	KWL/ZGKL	4,665,021	43,733	30,503.6
23.	Harbin Taiping International Airport	Harbin	Heilongjiang	HRB/ZYHB	4,432,645	40,194	52,446.8
24.	Jinan Yaoqiang International Airport	Jinan	Shandong	TNA/ZSJN	4,363,483	46,357	44,938.2
25.	Guiyang Longdongbao International Airport	Guiyang	Guizhou	KWE/ZUGY	4,248,005	47,685	39,696.6
26.	Fuzhou Changle International Airport	Fuzhou	Fujian	FOC/ZSFZ	4,247,236	43,928	56,512.1
27.	Tianjin Binhai International Airport	Tianjin	Tianjin	TSN/ZBTJ	3,860,788	65,665	125,059.4
28.	Taiyuan Wusu International Airport	Taiyuan, Jinzhong	Shanxi	TYN/ZBYN	3,613,308	43,061	27,886.4
29.	Wenzhou Yongqiang International Airport	Wenzhou	Zhejiang	WNZ/ZSWZ	3,587,940	34,762	37,340.5
30.	Ningbo Lishe International Airport	Ningbo	Zhejiang	NGB/ZSNB	3,300,626	31,541	39,626.1
31.	Nanchang Changbei International Airport	Nanchang	Jiangxi	KHN/ZSCN	3,068,124	32,002	25,438.5
32.	Nanning Wuxu International Airport	Nanning	Guangxi	NNG/ZGNN	2,917,272	32,022	34,291.0
33.	Changchun Longjia International Airport	Changchun	Jilin	CGQ/ZYCC	2,622,682	24,254	33,440.4
34.	Lanzhou Zhongchuan Airport	Lanzhou	Gansu	LHW/ZLLL	2,510,903	28,107	20,478.7
35.	Hefei Luogang International Airport	Hefei	Anhui	HFE/ZSOF	2,230,277	32,662	21,820.6
36.	Lijiang Sanyi Airport	Lijiang	Yunnan	LJG/ZPLJ	1,906,250	18,721	1,284.1
37.	Hohhot Baita International Airport	Hohhot	Inner Mongolia	HET/ZBHH	1,838,754	24,993	12,405.3
38.	Xishuangbanna Gasa Airport	Jinghong	Yunnan	JHG/ZPJH	1,807,633	17,508	6,148.7
39.	Yantai Laishan International Airport	Yantai	Shandong	YNT/ZSYT	1,640,387	18,948	21,600.6
40.	Jiuzhai Huanglong Airport	Jiuzhaigou	Sichuan	JZH/ZUJZ	1,559,117	14,147	0.0
41.	Zhangjiajie Hehua Airport	Zhangjiajie	Hunan	DYG/ZGDY	1,516,721	14,148	3,123.7
42.	Yinchuan Hedong Airport	Yinchuan	Ningxia	INC/ZLIC	1,369,834	15,921	10,527.0
43.	Wuxi Shuofang Airport	Wuxi	Jiangsu	WUX/ZSWX	1,359,830	13,740	19,705.2
44.	Quanzhou Jinjiang Airport	Quanzhou	Fujian	JJN/ZSQZ	1,195,916	12,682	9,943.8
45.	Lhasa Gonggar Airport	Lhasa, Shannan	Tibet	LXA/ZULS	1,187,104	10,819	11,694.2
46.	Shantou Waisha Airport	Shantou	Guangdong	SWA/ZGOW	1,115,179	12,296	9,003.0
47.	Zhuhai Jinwan Airport	Zhuhai	Guangdong	ZUH/ZGSD	1,041,080	25,405	10,745.0
48.	Xining Caojiabu Airport	Xining, Haidong	Qinghai	XNN/ZLXN	920,612	8,766	5,214.5
49.	Yanji Chaoyangchuan Airport	Yanji	Jilin	YNJ/ZYYJ	811,841	7,853	3,057.6
50.	Shijiazhuang Zhengding International Airport	Shijiazhuang	Hebei	SJW/ZBSJ	802,167	31,870	11,846.2
51.	Beijing Nanyuan Airport	Beijing	Beijing	NAY/ZBNY	753,415	7,111	7,997.5
52.	Weihai Dashuibo Airport	Weihai	Shandong	WEH/ZSWH	622,100	7,961	3,392.1
53.	Wuyishan Airport	Wuyishan	Fujian	WUS/ZSWY	547,538	5,609	830.2
54.	Yichang Sanxia Airport	Yichang	Hubei	YIH/ZHYC	538,112	6,911	2,408.6
55.	Baotou Erliban Airport	Baotou	Inner Mongolia	BAV/ZBOW	521,188	4,894	3,033.9
56.	Yiwu Airport	Yiwu	Zhejiang	YIW/ZSYW	512,271	5,094	3,626.7
57.	Changzhou Benniu Airport	Changzhou	Jiangsu	CZX/ZSCG	509,725	5,628	5,453.5
58.	Kashgar Airport	Kashgar	Xinjiang	KHG/ZWSH	502,591	4,138	2,119.3
59.	Xuzhou Guanyin Airport	Xuzhou	Jiangsu	XUZ/ZSXZ	414,057	6,258	2,693.3
60.	Dehong Mangshi Airport	Mangshi	Yunnan	LUM/ZPLX	399,338	4,032	3,157.0
61.	Dali Huangcaoba Airport	Dali	Yunnan	DLU/ZPDL	369,587	4,018	529.4
62.	Taizhou Luqiao Airport	Taizhou	Zhejiang	HYN/ZSLQ	367,637	3,974	2,779.6
63.	Diqing Shangri-La Airport	Shangri-La	Yunnan	DIG/ZPDQ	345,291	3,942	706.0
64.	Zhoushan Putuoshan Airport	Zhoushan	Zhejiang	HSN/ZSZS	338,021	5,509	568.9
65.	Huangshan Tunxi International Airport	Huangshan	Anhui	TXN/ZSTX	320,178	3,596	895.6
66.	Zhanjiang Airport	Zhanjiang	Guangdong	ZHA/ZGZJ	314,410	4,622	1,536.1
67.	Yining Airport	Yining	Xinjiang	YIN/ZWYN	312,637	4,869	388.8
68.	Altay Airport	Altay	Xinjiang	AAT/ZWAT	281,644	4,096	19.3
69.	Liuzhou Bailian Airport	Liuzhou	Guangxi	LZH/ZGZH	268,604	4,174	2,397.2
70.	Dunhuang Airport	Dunhuang	Gansu	DNH/ZLDH	259,124	3,698	103.5
71.	Xichang Qingshan Airport	Xichang	Sichuan	XIC/ZUXC	238,065	2,771	1,092.6
72.	Enshi Xujiaping Airport	Enshi	Hubei	ENH/ZHES	236,974	2,388	348.3
73.	Mianyang Nanjiao Airport	Mianyang	Sichuan	MIG/ZUMY	230,265	1,930	2,979.0
74.	Panzhihua Bao'anying Airport	Panzhihua	Sichuan	PZI/ZUZH	229,457	3,030	1,795.5
75.	Hailar Dongshan Airport	Hailar	Inner Mongolia	HLD/ZBLA	222,514	3,227	1,118.1
76.	Linyi Shubuling Airport	Linyi	Shandong	LYI/ZSLY	217,627	9,649	510.5
77.	Yuncheng Zhangxiao Airport	Yuncheng	Shanxi	YCU/ZBYC	208,740	3,044	721.7
78.	Lianyungang Baitabu Airport	Lianyungang	Jiangsu	LYG/ZSLG	199,515	2,677	788.7
79.	Beihai Fucheng Airport	Beihai	Guangxi	BHY/ZGBH	195,561	2,924	1,288.1
80.	Luoyang Beijiao Airport	Luoyang	Henan	LYA/ZHLY	170,784	196,720	586.3
81.	Nantong Xingdong Airport	Nantong	Jiangsu	NTG/ZSNT	168,283	16,771	2,008.5
82.	Yibin Caiba Airport	Yibin	Sichuan	YBP/ZUYB	165,983	1,874	1,918.5
83.	Changzhi Wangcun Airport	Changzhi	Shanxi	CIH/ZBCZ	160,046	2,546	191.2
84.	Jingdezhen Luojia Airport	Jingdezhen	Jiangxi	JDZ/ZSJD	155,415	2,376	139.7
85.	Mudanjiang Hailang Airport	Mudanjiang	Heilongjiang	MDG/ZYMD	148,892	1,746	696.0
86.	Lincang Airport	Lincang	Yunnan	LNJ/ZPLC	142,589	1,481	579.1
87.	Changde Taohuayuan Airport	Changde	Hunan	CGD/ZGCD	140,573	2,411	97.6
88.	Baoshan Airport	Baoshan	Yunnan	BSD/ZPBS	137,719	1,564	184.4
89.	Luzhou Lantian Airport	Luzhou	Sichuan	LZO/ZULZ	136,851	2,633	1,529.1
90.	Wanzhou Wuqiao Airport	Wanzhou	Chongqing	WXN/ZULP	136,576	1,973	659.7
91.	Wenshan Puzhehei Airport	Wenshan	Yunnan	WNH/ZPWS	136,164	1,968	661.9
92.	Korla Airport	Korla	Xinjiang	KRL/ZWKL	131,697	2,640	244.3
93.	Hotan Airport	Hotan	Xinjiang	HTN/ZWTN	131,549	1,294	487.6
94.	Manzhouli Airport	Manzhouli	Inner Mongolia	NZH/ZBMZ	114,949	1,628	799.0
95.	Yulin Xisha Airport	Yulin	Shaanxi	UYN/ZLYL	101,330	3,776	136.5
96.	Xiangyang Liuji Airport	Xiangyang	Hubei	XFN/ZHXF	100,796	1,764	218.4
97.	Pu'er Simao Airport	Pu'er	Yunnan	SYM/ZPSM	97,066	1,825	70.4
98.	Aksu Onsu Airport	Aksu	Xinjiang	AKU/ZWAK	86,657	1,694	304.3
99.	Jiamusi Dongjiao Airport	Jiamusi	Heilongjiang	JMU/ZYJM	86,448	884	189.6
100.	Ganzhou Huangjin Airport	Ganzhou	Jiangxi	KOW/ZSGZ	86,240	2,120	278.3

=== 2006 final statistics ===
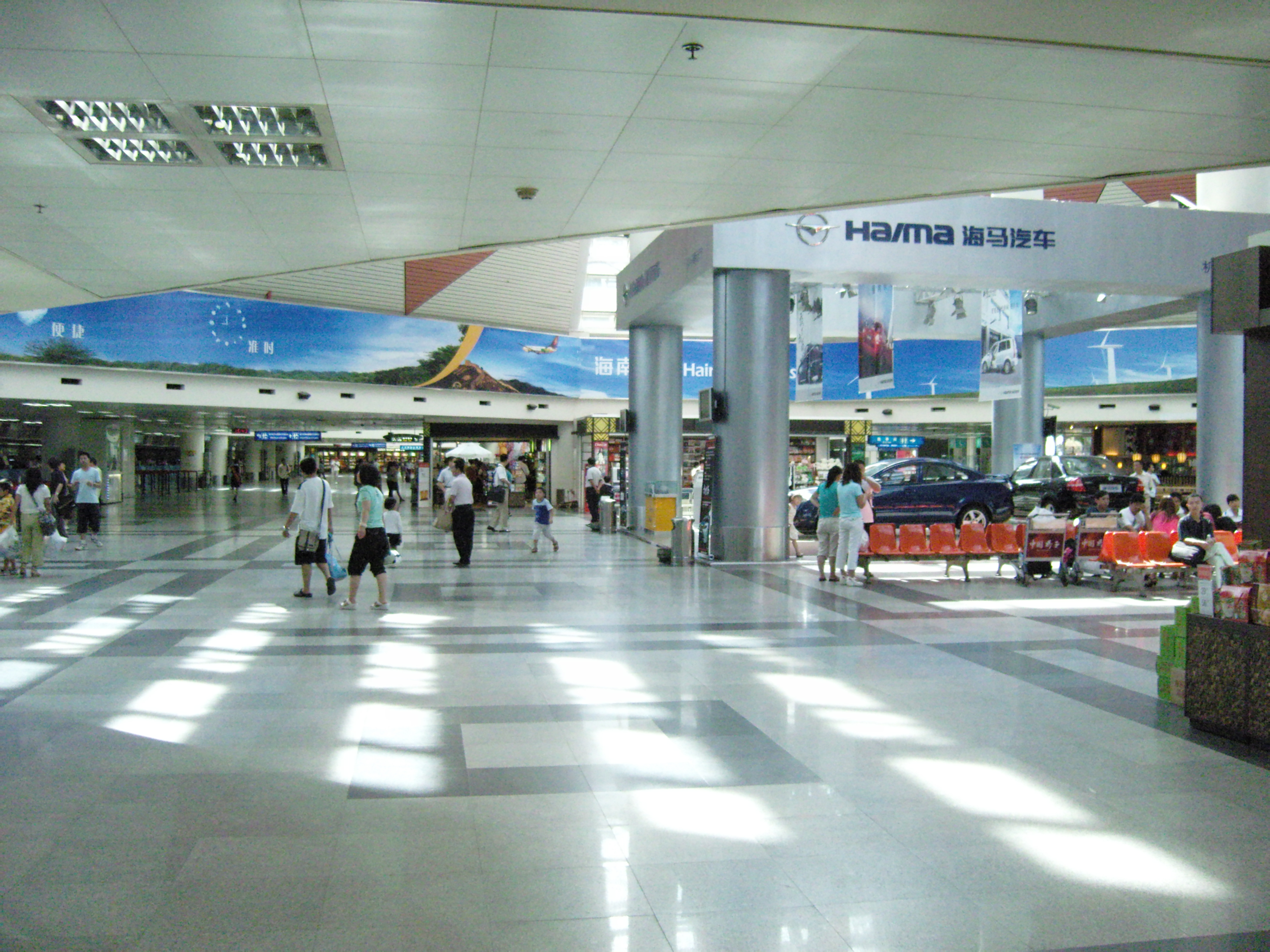
Haikou Meilan International Airport was once one of the busiest airports in China by passenger traffic (ranked 8 in 2003), but it has experienced a decline in the passenger flow. However, in 2013 Haikou Airport stopped the continuing fall of positions and keep steady at the number 21 of the busiest airports in China.

The 100 busiest airports in China in 2006 ordered by total passenger traffic, according to the CAAC report.

Rank	Airport	City served	Division	IATA/ ICAO	Passengers	Aircraft	Cargo
1.	Beijing Capital International Airport	Beijing	Beijing	PEK/ZBAA	48,748,298	378,888	1,201,815.0
2.	Shanghai Pudong International Airport	Shanghai	Shanghai	PVG/ZSPD	26,788,586	231,994	2,168,071.8
3.	Guangzhou Baiyun International Airport	Guangzhou	Guangdong	CAN/ZGGG	26,222,037	232,404	653,261.3
4.	Shanghai Hongqiao International Airport	Shanghai	Shanghai	SHA/ZSSS	19,336,517	177,626	363,581.4
5.	Shenzhen Bao'an International Airport	Shenzhen	Guangdong	SZX/ZGSZ	18,356,069	169,493	559,243.7
6.	Chengdu Shuangliu International Airport	Chengdu	Sichuan	CTU/ZUUU	16,280,225	155,484	295,497.9
7.	Kunming Wujiaba International Airport	Kunming	Yunnan	KMG/ZPPP	14,443,607	135,573	219,197.6
8.	Hangzhou Xiaoshan International Airport	Hangzhou	Zhejiang	HGH/ZSHC	9,919,532	100,799	185,518.1
9.	Xi'an Xianyang International Airport	Xi'an, Xianyang	Shaanxi	XIY/ZLXY	9,368,958	99,315	99,433.7
10.	Chongqing Jiangbei International Airport	Chongqing	Chongqing	CKG/ZUCK	8,050,007	88,929	120,178.3
11.	Xiamen Gaoqi International Airport	Xiamen	Fujian	XMN/ZSAM	7,501,004	77,355	175,011.1
12.	Qingdao Liuting International Airport	Qingdao	Shandong	TAO/ZSQD	6,791,240	72,008	101,266.9
13.	Haikou Meilan International Airport	Haikou	Hainan	HAK/ZJHK	6,668,795	61,738	62,510.0
14.	Changsha Huanghua International Airport	Changsha	Hunan	CSX/ZGHA	6,592,602	71,139	62,571.3
15.	Dalian Zhoushuizi International Airport	Dalian	Liaoning	DLC/ZYTL	6,351,089	56,374	108,992.5
16.	Nanjing Lukou International Airport	Nanjing	Jiangsu	NKG/ZSNJ	6,269,103	64,591	152,063.2
17.	Wuhan Tianhe International Airport	Wuhan	Hubei	WUH/ZHHH	6,100,582	66,876	73,770.0
18.	Shenyang Taoxian International Airport	Shenyang	Liaoning	SHE/ZYTX	5,343,566	48,931	90,253.9
19.	Ürümqi Diwopu International Airport	Ürümqi	Xinjiang	URC/ZWWW	5,136,028	51,602	76,215.1
20.	Guilin Liangjiang International Airport	Guilin	Guangxi	KWL/ZGKL	3,998,958	39,519	24,844.2
21.	Sanya Phoenix International Airport	Sanya	Hainan	SYX/ZJSY	3,905,956	32,850	23,827.9
22.	Zhengzhou Xinzheng International Airport	Zhengzhou	Henan	CGO/ZHCC	3,879,949	44,211	50,824.2
23.	Fuzhou Changle International Airport	Fuzhou	Fujian	FOC/ZSFZ	3,794,123	40,793	54,274.4
24.	Guiyang Longdongbao International Airport	Guiyang	Guizhou	KWE/ZUGY	3,717,999	43,205	39,713.1
25.	Jinan Yaoqiang International Airport	Jinan	Shandong	TNA/ZSJN	3,696,305	41,901	38,166.1
26.	Harbin Taiping International Airport	Harbin	Heilongjiang	HRB/ZYHB	3,643,232	33,863	44,920.8
27.	Wenzhou Yongqiang International Airport	Wenzhou	Zhejiang	WNZ/ZSWZ	3,045,854	31,524	31,007.5
28.	Ningbo Lishe International Airport	Ningbo	Zhejiang	NGB/ZSNB	2,972,429	30,865	38,768.1
29.	Taiyuan Wusu International Airport	Taiyuan, Jinzhong	Shanxi	TYN/ZBYN	2,843,482	38,356	27,889.0
30.	Tianjin Binhai International Airport	Tianjin	Tianjin	TSN/ZBTJ	2,766,504	54,948	96,755.7
31.	Nanchang Changbei International Airport	Nanchang	Jiangxi	KHN/ZSCN	2,764,420	29,547	23,744.5
32.	Nanning Wuxu International Airport	Nanning	Guangxi	NNG/ZGNN	2,244,234	27,248	28,271.9
33.	Changchun Longjia International Airport	Changchun	Jilin	CGQ/ZYCC	2,227,352	21,756	26,458.9
34.	Lanzhou Zhongchuan Airport	Lanzhou	Gansu	LHW/ZLLL	1,861,148	21,902	14,886.1
35.	Hefei Luogang International Airport	Hefei	Anhui	HFE/ZSOF	1,851,464	24,000	21,455.4
36.	Xishuangbanna Gasa Airport	Jinghong	Yunnan	JHG/ZPJH	1,594,186	15,606	6,264.9
37.	Lijiang Sanyi Airport	Lijiang	Yunnan	LJG/ZPLJ	1,542,722	15,431	1,125.7
38.	Zhangjiajie Hehua Airport	Zhangjiajie	Hunan	DYG/ZGDY	1,537,453	14,494	3,903.2
39.	Hohhot Baita International Airport	Hohhot	Inner Mongolia	HET/ZBHH	1,509,643	21,468	9,642.3
40.	Yantai Laishan International Airport	Yantai	Shandong	YNT/ZSYT	1,419,197	17,541	21,473.0
41.	Quanzhou Jinjiang Airport	Quanzhou	Fujian	JJN/ZSQZ	1,171,712	12,268	9,497.0
42.	Jiuzhai Huanglong Airport	Jiuzhaigou	Sichuan	JZH/ZUJZ	1,123,636	9,866	112.2
43.	Yinchuan Hedong Airport	Yinchuan	Ningxia	INC/ZLIC	1,077,580	13,589	9,124.0
44.	Lhasa Gonggar Airport	Lhasa, Shannan	Tibet	LXA/ZULS	1,043,051	9,168	10,587.3
45.	Shantou Waisha Airport	Shantou	Guangdong	SWA/ZGOW	985,874	11,644	8,729.5
46.	Wuxi Shuofang Airport	Wuxi	Jiangsu	WUX/ZSWX	924,883	9,469	13,877.1
47.	Zhuhai Jinwan Airport	Zhuhai	Guangdong	ZUH/ZGSD	799,125	24,352	8,872.7
48.	Xining Caojiabu Airport	Xining, Haidong	Qinghai	XNN/ZLXN	742,429	7,733	4,720.7
49.	Yanji Chaoyangchuan Airport	Yanji	Jilin	YNJ/ZYYJ	700,067	6,837	2,197.8
50.	Shijiazhuang Zhengding International Airport	Shijiazhuang	Hebei	SJW/ZBSJ	630,239	50,593	12,129.4
51.	Wuyishan Airport	Wuyishan	Fujian	WUS/ZSWY	541,503	5,967	805.3
52.	Yichang Sanxia Airport	Yichang	Hubei	YIH/ZHYC	508,386	6,260	2,073.5
53.	Kashgar Airport	Kashgar	Xinjiang	KHG/ZWSH	444,332	4,017	1,539.4
54.	Changzhou Benniu Airport	Changzhou	Jiangsu	CZX/ZSCG	438,442	4,546	4,298.9
55.	Baotou Erliban Airport	Baotou	Inner Mongolia	BAV/ZBOW	410,628	5,643	2,063.0
56.	Weihai Dashuibo Airport	Weihai	Shandong	WEH/ZSWH	405,408	5,530	2,547.9
57.	Dali Huangcaoba Airport	Dali	Yunnan	DLU/ZPDL	365,999	4,314	401.0
58.	Huangshan Tunxi International Airport	Huangshan	Anhui	TXN/ZSTX	365,660	4,200	893.6
59.	Dehong Mangshi Airport	Mangshi	Yunnan	LUM/ZPLX	355,900	3,654	2,716.9
60.	Yiwu Airport	Yiwu	Zhejiang	YIW/ZSYW	327,631	3,467	3,041.0
61.	Zhoushan Putuoshan Airport	Zhoushan	Zhejiang	HSN/ZSZS	320,976	5,113	501.6
62.	Zhanjiang Airport	Zhanjiang	Guangdong	ZHA/ZGZJ	308,233	4,621	1,605.9
63.	Diqing Shangri-La Airport	Shangri-La	Yunnan	DIG/ZPDQ	303,939	3,894	541.6
64.	Beijing Nanyuan Airport	Beijing	Beijing	NAY/ZBNY	301,045	3,454	2,142.7
65.	Xuzhou Guanyin Airport	Xuzhou	Jiangsu	XUZ/ZSXZ	300,059	4,789	1,880.4
66.	Taizhou Luqiao Airport	Taizhou	Zhejiang	HYN/ZSLQ	271,279	2,956	2,012.9
67.	Yining Airport	Yining	Xinjiang	YIN/ZWYN	267,801	4,425	368.2
68.	Dunhuang Airport	Dunhuang	Gansu	DNH/ZLDH	238,842	3,666	116.1
69.	Panzhihua Bao'anying Airport	Panzhihua	Sichuan	PZI/ZUZH	237,843	3,138	1,865.1
70.	Altay Airport	Altay	Xinjiang	AAT/ZWAT	200,315	2,691	12.2
71.	Xichang Qingshan Airport	Xichang	Sichuan	XIC/ZUXC	181,578	2,866	496.7
72.	Yibin Caiba Airport	Yibin	Sichuan	YBP/ZUYB	169,418	1,881	1,677.5
73.	Korla Airport	Korla	Xinjiang	KRL/ZWKL	168,430	3,317	280.6
74.	Enshi Xujiaping Airport	Enshi	Hubei	ENH/ZHES	163,023	1,961	183.3
75.	Beihai Fucheng Airport	Beihai	Guangxi	BHY/ZGBH	162,637	2,844	1,038.3
76.	Linyi Shubuling Airport	Linyi	Shandong	LYI/ZSLY	159,301	4,477	488.3
77.	Liuzhou Bailian Airport	Liuzhou	Guangxi	LZH/ZGZH	157,153	2,072	1,517.5
78.	Lianyungang Baitabu Airport	Lianyungang	Jiangsu	LYG/ZSLG	154,753	2,177	541.6
79.	Hailar Dongshan Airport	Hailar	Inner Mongolia	HLD/ZBLA	150,561	2,584	609.3
80.	Luoyang Beijiao Airport	Luoyang	Henan	LYA/ZHLY	149,420	166,899	467.2
81.	Mudanjiang Hailang Airport	Mudanjiang	Heilongjiang	MDG/ZYMD	147,821	1,788	318.3
82.	Mianyang Nanjiao Airport	Mianyang	Sichuan	MIG/ZUMY	146,335	1,296	2,020.0
83.	Yuncheng Zhangxiao Airport	Yuncheng	Shanxi	YCU/ZBYC	145,636	2,233	240.7
84.	Lincang Airport	Lincang	Yunnan	LNJ/ZPLC	118,174	1,307	284.6
85.	Changde Taohuayuan Airport	Changde	Hunan	CGD/ZGCD	115,668	2,399	78.8
86.	Nantong Xingdong Airport	Nantong	Jiangsu	NTG/ZSNT	113,185	10,222	1,570.4
87.	Yulin Xisha Airport	Yulin	Shaanxi	UYN/ZLYL	111,742	3,988	71.1
88.	Baoshan Airport	Baoshan	Yunnan	BSD/ZPBS	109,894	1,186	185.2
89.	Jingdezhen Luojia Airport	Jingdezhen	Jiangxi	JDZ/ZSJD	105,363	1,640	72.1
90.	Changzhi Wangcun Airport	Changzhi	Shanxi	CIH/ZBCZ	104,500	2,649	87.3
91.	Luzhou Lantian Airport	Luzhou	Sichuan	LZO/ZULZ	102,875	1,778	1,335.2
92.	Hotan Airport	Hotan	Xinjiang	HTN/ZWTN	99,400	848	363.5
93.	Manzhouli Airport	Manzhouli	Inner Mongolia	NZH/ZBMZ	80,788	1,390	656.1
94.	Xiangyang Liuji Airport	Xiangyang	Hubei	XFN/ZHXF	77,292	1,134	188.7
95.	Aksu Onsu Airport	Aksu	Xinjiang	AKU/ZWAK	77,249	1,421	307.0
96.	Tongren Fenghuang Airport	Tongren	Guizhou	TEN/ZUTR	71,359	1,569	12.5
97.	Wanzhou Wuqiao Airport	Wanzhou	Chongqing	WXN/ZULP	69,177	1,720	360.2
98.	Ganzhou Huangjin Airport	Ganzhou	Jiangxi	KOW/ZSGZ	68,821	1,705	70.8
99.	Zhaotong Airport	Zhaotong	Yunnan	ZAT/ZPZT	64,967	703	235.9
100.	Dandong Langtou Airport	Dandong	Liaoning	DDG/ZYDD	62,684	719	500.2

=== 2005 final statistics ===
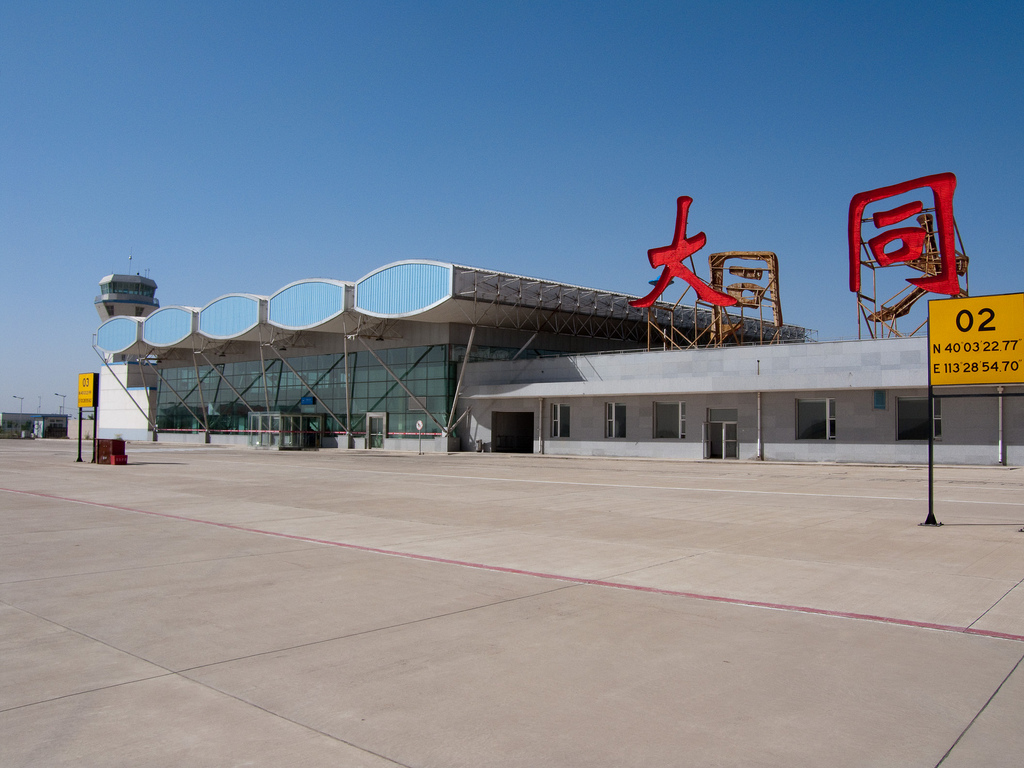
And China's 100th airport by passenger traffic is the relatively new Datong Yungang Airport, receiving almost 360,000 passengers yearly.

The 100 busiest airports in China in 2005 ordered by total passenger traffic, according to the CAAC report.

Rank	Airport	City served	Division	IATA/ ICAO	Passengers	Aircraft	Cargo
1.	Beijing Capital International Airport	Beijing	Beijing	PEK/ZBAA	41,004,008	341,681	782,066.0
2.	Shanghai Pudong International Airport	Shanghai	Shanghai	PVG/ZSPD	23,664,967	205,046	1,857,119.8
3.	Guangzhou Baiyun International Airport	Guangzhou	Guangdong	CAN/ZGGG	23,558,274	211,309	600,603.9
4.	Shanghai Hongqiao International Airport	Shanghai	Shanghai	SHA/ZSSS	17,797,365	169,957	359,594.5
5.	Shenzhen Bao'an International Airport	Shenzhen	Guangdong	SZX/ZGSZ	16,283,071	151,430	466,476.4
6.	Chengdu Shuangliu International Airport	Chengdu	Sichuan	CTU/ZUUU	13,899,929	132,901	251,017.9
7.	Kunming Wujiaba International Airport	Kunming	Yunnan	KMG/ZPPP	11,818,682	109,035	196,530.2
8.	Hangzhou Xiaoshan International Airport	Hangzhou	Zhejiang	HGH/ZSHC	8,092,641	79,262	165,917.9
9.	Xi'an Xianyang International Airport	Xi'an, Xianyang	Shaanxi	XIY/ZLXY	7,942,034	91,372	83,256.1
10.	Haikou Meilan International Airport	Haikou	Hainan	HAK/ZJHK	7,027,397	68,879	60,590.3
11.	Chongqing Jiangbei International Airport	Chongqing	Chongqing	CKG/ZUCK	6,631,420	72,674	100,909.9
12.	Xiamen Gaoqi International Airport	Xiamen	Fujian	XMN/ZSAM	6,585,489	67,014	158,740.2
13.	Qingdao Liuting International Airport	Qingdao	Shandong	TAO/ZSQD	5,879,552	62,826	89,057.7
14.	Dalian Zhoushuizi International Airport	Dalian	Liaoning	DLC/ZYTL	5,407,452	50,387	99,077.9
15.	Nanjing Lukou International Airport	Nanjing	Jiangsu	NKG/ZSNJ	5,385,933	55,508	139,368.5
16.	Changsha Huanghua International Airport	Changsha	Hunan	CSX/ZGHA	5,301,396	59,534	52,360.3
17.	Wuhan Tianhe International Airport	Wuhan	Hubei	WUH/ZHHH	4,743,877	51,793	64,017.2
18.	Shenyang Taoxian International Airport	Shenyang	Liaoning	SHE/ZYTX	4,560,162	43,072	83,350.8
19.	Ürümqi Diwopu International Airport	Ürümqi	Xinjiang	URC/ZWWW	4,424,458	48,916	61,617.3
20.	Fuzhou Changle International Airport	Fuzhou	Fujian	FOC/ZSFZ	3,454,812	36,525	50,075.5
21.	Guilin Liangjiang International Airport	Guilin	Guangxi	KWL/ZGKL	3,384,709	34,018	23,828.6
22.	Harbin Taiping International Airport	Harbin	Heilongjiang	HRB/ZYHB	3,222,907	30,870	41,105.9
23.	Guiyang Longdongbao International Airport	Guiyang	Guizhou	KWE/ZUGY	3,125,390	35,318	33,311.0
24.	Sanya Phoenix International Airport	Sanya	Hainan	SYX/ZJSY	3,087,045	26,351	21,378.1
25.	Jinan Yaoqiang International Airport	Jinan	Shandong	TNA/ZSJN	3,063,946	35,805	34,498.6
26.	Zhengzhou Xinzheng International Airport	Zhengzhou	Henan	CGO/ZHCC	2,969,318	33,403	44,713.7
27.	Wenzhou Yongqiang International Airport	Wenzhou	Zhejiang	WNZ/ZSWZ	2,623,149	28,328	26,100.0
28.	Ningbo Lishe International Airport	Ningbo	Zhejiang	NGB/ZSNB	2,532,910	27,006	30,747.7
29.	Nanchang Changbei International Airport	Nanchang	Jiangxi	KHN/ZSCN	2,303,545	25,558	17,369.9
30.	Taiyuan Wusu International Airport	Taiyuan, Jinzhong	Shanxi	TYN/ZBYN	2,240,291	31,761	29,758.6
31.	Tianjin Binhai International Airport	Tianjin	Tianjin	TSN/ZBTJ	2,193,914	47,460	80,192.3
32.	Nanning Wuxu International Airport	Nanning	Guangxi	NNG/ZGNN	1,878,047	23,916	22,617.8
33.	Changchun Longjia International Airport	Changchun	Jilin	CGQ/ZYCC	1,753,235	18,677	20,004.7
34.	Zhangjiajie Hehua Airport	Zhangjiajie	Hunan	DYG/ZGDY	1,584,834	14,768	3,363.2
35.	Hefei Luogang International Airport	Hefei	Anhui	HFE/ZSOF	1,511,705	18,750	19,386.9
36.	Lanzhou Zhongchuan Airport	Lanzhou	Gansu	LHW/ZLLL	1,439,164	19,186	10,686.3
37.	Xishuangbanna Gasa Airport	Jinghong	Yunnan	JHG/ZPJH	1,217,734	11,397	6,853.9
38.	Yantai Laishan International Airport	Yantai	Shandong	YNT/ZSYT	1,216,313	14,881	18,135.9
39.	Quanzhou Jinjiang Airport	Quanzhou	Fujian	JJN/ZSQZ	1,204,424	12,323	10,073.5
40.	Lijiang Sanyi Airport	Lijiang	Yunnan	LJG/ZPLJ	1,114,264	11,414	605.9
41.	Hohhot Baita International Airport	Hohhot	Inner Mongolia	HET/ZBHH	1,101,698	16,089	8,554.1
42.	Jiuzhai Huanglong Airport	Jiuzhaigou	Sichuan	JZH/ZUJZ	1,097,204	8,868	59.5
43.	Shantou Waisha Airport	Shantou	Guangdong	SWA/ZGOW	913,276	11,158	8,758.1
44.	Yinchuan Hedong Airport	Yinchuan	Ningxia	INC/ZLIC	876,455	12,334	7,464.2
45.	Lhasa Gonggar Airport	Lhasa, Shannan	Tibet	LXA/ZULS	857,671	5,991	7,284.4
46.	Zhuhai Jinwan Airport	Zhuhai	Guangdong	ZUH/ZGSD	657,117	22,742	7,980.8
47.	Yanji Chaoyangchuan Airport	Yanji	Jilin	YNJ/ZYYJ	639,788	6,492	1,817.2
48.	Wuxi Shuofang Airport	Wuxi	Jiangsu	WUX/ZSWX	619,131	6,296	11,524.7
49.	Xining Caojiabu Airport	Xining, Haidong	Qinghai	XNN/ZLXN	537,551	6,931	3,436.3
50.	Wuyishan Airport	Wuyishan	Fujian	WUS/ZSWY	523,135	6,144	917.5
51.	Shijiazhuang Zhengding International Airport	Shijiazhuang	Hebei	SJW/ZBSJ	456,209	36,271	16,566.3
52.	Yichang Sanxia Airport	Yichang	Hubei	YIH/ZHYC	419,046	5,860	1,169.0
53.	Zhoushan Putuoshan Airport	Zhoushan	Zhejiang	HSN/ZSZS	397,947	6,629	1,094.1
54.	Kashgar Airport	Kashgar	Xinjiang	KHG/ZWSH	389,680	3,397	1,128.6
55.	Huangshan Tunxi International Airport	Huangshan	Anhui	TXN/ZSTX	389,380	4,572	1,060.6
56.	Baotou Erliban Airport	Baotou	Inner Mongolia	BAV/ZBOW	342,582	4,736	1,674.2
57.	Dali Huangcaoba Airport	Dali	Yunnan	DLU/ZPDL	323,440	3,564	527.2
58.	Changzhou Benniu Airport	Changzhou	Jiangsu	CZX/ZSCG	316,180	3,176	3,623.4
59.	Zhanjiang Airport	Zhanjiang	Guangdong	ZHA/ZGZJ	313,650	5,061	1,530.3
60.	Dehong Mangshi Airport	Mangshi	Yunnan	LUM/ZPLX	304,205	3,044	1,307.1
61.	Yining Airport	Yining	Xinjiang	YIN/ZWYN	267,864	4,758	326.8
62.	Weihai Dashuibo Airport	Weihai	Shandong	WEH/ZSWH	232,105	3,024	1,410.9
63.	Dunhuang Airport	Dunhuang	Gansu	DNH/ZLDH	226,893	3,577	67.8
64.	Taizhou Luqiao Airport	Taizhou	Zhejiang	HYN/ZSLQ	225,874	2,900	1,726.8
65.	Diqing Shangri-La Airport	Shangri-La	Yunnan	DIG/ZPDQ	224,124	2,854	273.4
66.	Xuzhou Guanyin Airport	Xuzhou	Jiangsu	XUZ/ZSXZ	216,622	3,758	1,293.7
67.	Yiwu Airport	Yiwu	Zhejiang	YIW/ZSYW	208,588	2,321	2,507.8
68.	Beihai Fucheng Airport	Beihai	Guangxi	BHY/ZGBH	200,002	3,593	1,261.3
69.	Korla Airport	Korla	Xinjiang	KRL/ZWKL	195,840	4,199	288.4
70.	Altay Airport	Altay	Xinjiang	AAT/ZWAT	193,323	3,414	18.3
71.	Panzhihua Bao'anying Airport	Panzhihua	Sichuan	PZI/ZUZH	179,424	2,004	1,969.4
72.	Luoyang Beijiao Airport	Luoyang	Henan	LYA/ZHLY	157,760	162,944	897.7
73.	Xichang Qingshan Airport	Xichang	Sichuan	XIC/ZUXC	152,280	2,704	276.9
74.	Yibin Caiba Airport	Yibin	Sichuan	YBP/ZUYB	149,666	1,670	1,639.4
75.	Mudanjiang Hailang Airport	Mudanjiang	Heilongjiang	MDG/ZYMD	132,876	1,670	328.7
76.	Mianyang Nanjiao Airport	Mianyang	Sichuan	MIG/ZUMY	130,295	1,440	2,254.8
77.	Hailar Dongshan Airport	Hailar	Inner Mongolia	HLD/ZBLA	129,486	2,091	279.8
78.	Linyi Shubuling Airport	Linyi	Shandong	LYI/ZSLY	117,890	4,411	323.9
79.	Changzhi Wangcun Airport	Changzhi	Shanxi	CIH/ZBCZ	96,282	2,350	117.1
80.	Lianyungang Baitabu Airport	Lianyungang	Jiangsu	LYG/ZSLG	96,154	1,837	543.8
81.	Yulin Xisha Airport	Yulin	Shaanxi	UYN/ZLYL	95,749	2,962	62.3
82.	Hotan Airport	Hotan	Xinjiang	HTN/ZWTN	92,080	804	286.5
83.	Nantong Xingdong Airport	Nantong	Jiangsu	NTG/ZSNT	89,337	1,276	1,269.3
84.	Baoshan Airport	Baoshan	Yunnan	BSD/ZPBS	89,168	1,206	147.8
85.	Aksu Onsu Airport	Aksu	Xinjiang	AKU/ZWAK	87,443	2,188	311.0
86.	Jingdezhen Luojia Airport	Jingdezhen	Jiangxi	JDZ/ZSJD	86,386	1,485	35.5
87.	Lincang Airport	Lincang	Yunnan	LNJ/ZPLC	78,307	894	236.3
88.	Liuzhou Bailian Airport	Liuzhou	Guangxi	LZH/ZGZH	74,593	1,503	446.7
89.	Wanzhou Wuqiao Airport	Wanzhou	Chongqing	WXN/ZULP	73,682	1,573	511.8
90.	Changde Taohuayuan Airport	Changde	Hunan	CGD/ZGCD	70,120	1,090	73.1
91.	Enshi Xujiaping Airport	Enshi	Hubei	ENH/ZHES	70,075	2,362	83.3
92.	Jilin Ertaizi Airport	Jilin City	Jilin	JIL/ZYJL	68,624	1,084	112.1
93.	Qiqihar Sanjiazi Airport	Qiqihar	Heilongjiang	NDG/ZYQQ	65,135	759	272.1
94.	Yuncheng Zhangxiao Airport	Yuncheng	Shanxi	YCU/ZBYC	64,774	1,017	73.1
95.	Xiangyang Liuji Airport	Xiangyang	Hubei	XFN/ZHXF	57,244	824	149.0
96.	Jiamusi Dongjiao Airport	Jiamusi	Heilongjiang	JMU/ZYJM	57,126	802	50.7
97.	Manzhouli Airport	Manzhouli	Inner Mongolia	NZH/ZBMZ	55,555	946	233.9
98.	Tongren Fenghuang Airport	Tongren	Guizhou	TEN/ZUTR	52,243	1,005	26.6
99.	Qamdo Bangda Airport	Qamdo	Tibet	BPX/ZUBD	51,274	552	95.8
100.	Pu'er Simao Airport	Pu'er	Yunnan	SYM/ZPSM	45,422	512	74.4

=== 2004 final statistics ===
The 100 busiest airports in China in 2004 ordered by total passenger traffic, according to the CAAC report.

Rank	Airport	City served	Division	IATA/ ICAO	Passengers	Aircraft	Cargo
1.	Beijing Capital International Airport	Beijing	Beijing	PEK/ZBAA	34,883,190	304,882	668,690.3
2.	Shanghai Pudong International Airport	Shanghai	Shanghai	PVG/ZSPD	21,021,723	178,681	1,642,176.0
3.	Guangzhou Baiyun International Airport	Guangzhou	Guangdong	CAN/ZGGG	20,326,138	182,780	506,988.3
4.	Shanghai Hongqiao International Airport	Shanghai	Shanghai	SHA/ZSSS	14,889,198	150,794	294,020.1
5.	Shenzhen Bao'an International Airport	Shenzhen	Guangdong	SZX/ZGSZ	14,253,046	140,452	423,270.9
6.	Chengdu Shuangliu International Airport	Chengdu	Sichuan	CTU/ZUUU	11,685,643	110,186	213,039.7
7.	Kunming Wujiaba International Airport	Kunming	Yunnan	KMG/ZPPP	9,797,260	92,385	171,013.0
8.	Haikou Meilan International Airport	Haikou	Hainan	HAK/ZJHK	7,478,210	68,282	66,582.7
9.	Xi'an Xianyang International Airport	Xi'an, Xianyang	Shaanxi	XIY/ZLXY	6,362,409	77,655	73,368.8
10.	Hangzhou Xiaoshan International Airport	Hangzhou	Zhejiang	HGH/ZSHC	6,338,042	67,000	128,208.6
11.	Xiamen Gaoqi International Airport	Xiamen	Fujian	XMN/ZSAM	5,576,369	62,214	141,654.4
12.	Chongqing Jiangbei International Airport	Chongqing	Chongqing	CKG/ZUCK	5,233,774	64,750	87,568.0
13.	Qingdao Liuting International Airport	Qingdao	Shandong	TAO/ZSQD	4,808,416	57,557	75,498.3
14.	Dalian Zhoushuizi International Airport	Dalian	Liaoning	DLC/ZYTL	4,614,166	46,554	89,699.4
15.	Nanjing Lukou International Airport	Nanjing	Jiangsu	NKG/ZSNJ	4,573,987	51,561	117,801.6
16.	Wuhan Tianhe International Airport	Wuhan	Hubei	WUH/ZHHH	4,327,101	48,263	61,378.1
17.	Shenyang Taoxian International Airport	Shenyang	Liaoning	SHE/ZYTX	4,100,174	41,482	85,343.2
18.	Ürümqi Diwopu International Airport	Ürümqi	Xinjiang	URC/ZWWW	3,891,385	47,340	48,464.9
19.	Changsha Huanghua International Airport	Changsha	Hunan	CSX/ZGHA	3,802,550	55,054	43,133.2
20.	Fuzhou Changle International Airport	Fuzhou	Fujian	FOC/ZSFZ	3,128,778	35,921	49,124.0
21.	Guilin Liangjiang International Airport	Guilin	Guangxi	KWL/ZGKL	2,902,168	31,621	21,075.0
22.	Harbin Taiping International Airport	Harbin	Heilongjiang	HRB/ZYHB	2,726,010	26,585	35,084.9
23.	Guiyang Longdongbao International Airport	Guiyang	Guizhou	KWE/ZUGY	2,719,799	32,482	30,018.9
24.	Zhengzhou Xinzheng International Airport	Zhengzhou	Henan	CGO/ZHCC	2,572,679	31,569	27,600.0
25.	Sanya Phoenix International Airport	Sanya	Hainan	SYX/ZJSY	2,525,851	21,167	17,055.0
26.	Wenzhou Yongqiang International Airport	Wenzhou	Zhejiang	WNZ/ZSWZ	2,439,392	29,742	25,435.7
27.	Jinan Yaoqiang International Airport	Jinan	Shandong	TNA/ZSJN	2,371,786	32,733	32,237.3
28.	Ningbo Lishe International Airport	Ningbo	Zhejiang	NGB/ZSNB	1,852,107	20,616	25,524.0
29.	Tianjin Binhai International Airport	Tianjin	Tianjin	TSN/ZBTJ	1,705,271	28,087	70,995.1
30.	Taiyuan Wusu International Airport	Taiyuan, Jinzhong	Shanxi	TYN/ZBYN	1,680,127	21,712	28,085.7
31.	Nanning Wuxu International Airport	Nanning	Guangxi	NNG/ZGNN	1,645,874	20,241	18,567.5
32.	Nanchang Changbei International Airport	Nanchang	Jiangxi	KHN/ZSCN	1,633,782	20,179	16,143.1
33.	Changchun Longjia International Airport	Changchun	Jilin	CGQ/ZYCC	1,519,384	16,708	15,839.4
34.	Zhangjiajie Hehua Airport	Zhangjiajie	Hunan	DYG/ZGDY	1,318,102	13,169	2,904.9
35.	Hefei Luogang International Airport	Hefei	Anhui	HFE/ZSOF	1,237,290	14,849	18,297.1
36.	Xishuangbanna Gasa Airport	Jinghong	Yunnan	JHG/ZPJH	1,174,006	10,804	4,925.3
37.	Quanzhou Jinjiang Airport	Quanzhou	Fujian	JJN/ZSQZ	1,160,985	11,950	11,562.9
38.	Lanzhou Zhongchuan Airport	Lanzhou	Gansu	LHW/ZLLL	1,041,484	17,960	10,445.5
39.	Yantai Laishan International Airport	Yantai	Shandong	YNT/ZSYT	1,001,632	12,505	11,890.2
40.	Jiuzhai Huanglong Airport	Jiuzhaigou	Sichuan	JZH/ZUJZ	904,264	7,081	58.6
41.	Lijiang Sanyi Airport	Lijiang	Yunnan	LJG/ZPLJ	888,708	8,772	691.2
42.	Shantou Waisha Airport	Shantou	Guangdong	SWA/ZGOW	827,295	11,017	8,083.4
43.	Hohhot Baita International Airport	Hohhot	Inner Mongolia	HET/ZBHH	819,195	13,009	12,990.9
44.	Lhasa Gonggar Airport	Lhasa, Shannan	Tibet	LXA/ZULS	778,438	4,194	7,130.3
45.	Zhuhai Jinwan Airport	Zhuhai	Guangdong	ZUH/ZGSD	753,904	22,389	9,731.6
46.	Yinchuan Hedong Airport	Yinchuan	Ningxia	INC/ZLIC	697,052	11,230	5,693.8
47.	Yanji Chaoyangchuan Airport	Yanji	Jilin	YNJ/ZYYJ	555,058	5,148	872.5
48.	Wuyishan Airport	Wuyishan	Fujian	WUS/ZSWY	554,911	6,053	831.2
49.	Xining Caojiabu Airport	Xining, Haidong	Qinghai	XNN/ZLXN	448,396	7,575	3,256.3
50.	Zhanjiang Airport	Zhanjiang	Guangdong	ZHA/ZGZJ	400,127	6,826	1,821.9
51.	Zhoushan Putuoshan Airport	Zhoushan	Zhejiang	HSN/ZSZS	380,538	5,762	1,279.7
52.	Huangshan Tunxi International Airport	Huangshan	Anhui	TXN/ZSTX	372,800	4,370	1,726.7
53.	Yichang Sanxia Airport	Yichang	Hubei	YIH/ZHYC	346,537	5,045	986.2
54.	Kashgar Airport	Kashgar	Xinjiang	KHG/ZWSH	329,945	3,121	833.4
55.	Wuxi Shuofang Airport	Wuxi	Jiangsu	WUX/ZSWX	326,704	3,012	7,005.0
56.	Baotou Erliban Airport	Baotou	Inner Mongolia	BAV/ZBOW	293,932	3,517	1,823.3
57.	Yining Airport	Yining	Xinjiang	YIN/ZWYN	291,025	5,282	794.8
58.	Dali Huangcaoba Airport	Dali	Yunnan	DLU/ZPDL	276,442	2,694	554.0
59.	Beihai Fucheng Airport	Beihai	Guangxi	BHY/ZGBH	268,863	3,723	1,381.1
60.	Shijiazhuang Zhengding International Airport	Shijiazhuang	Hebei	SJW/ZBSJ	255,147	6,565	19,891.6
61.	Changzhou Benniu Airport	Changzhou	Jiangsu	CZX/ZSCG	241,386	3,004	2,773.9
62.	Korla Airport	Korla	Xinjiang	KRL/ZWKL	227,085	4,682	192.7
63.	Dehong Mangshi Airport	Mangshi	Yunnan	LUM/ZPLX	217,469	2,004	1,201.8
64.	Taizhou Luqiao Airport	Taizhou	Zhejiang	HYN/ZSLQ	196,710	3,268	1,887.1
65.	Yiwu Airport	Yiwu	Zhejiang	YIW/ZSYW	190,316	2,254	2,394.5
66.	Panzhihua Bao'anying Airport	Panzhihua	Sichuan	PZI/ZUZH	185,999	2,070	960.8
67.	Dunhuang Airport	Dunhuang	Gansu	DNH/ZLDH	177,808	3,892	34.6
68.	Altay Airport	Altay City	Xinjiang	AAT/ZWAT	170,960	3,432	10.9
69.	Diqing Shangri-La Airport	Shangri-La	Yunnan	DIG/ZPDQ	167,522	2,004	450.2
70.	Mianyang Nanjiao Airport	Mianyang	Sichuan	MIG/ZUMY	161,082	1,843	2,522.6
71.	Mudanjiang Hailang Airport	Mudanjiang	Heilongjiang	MDG/ZYMD	151,166	1,978	386.8
72.	Xuzhou Guanyin Airport	Xuzhou	Jiangsu	XUZ/ZSXZ	134,447	3,121	1,014.9
73.	Yibin Caiba Airport	Yibin	Sichuan	YBP/ZUYB	133,016	1,914	1,502.9
74.	Weihai Dashuibo Airport	Weihai	Shandong	WEH/ZSWH	117,679	1,746	568.2
75.	Xichang Qingshan Airport	Xichang	Sichuan	XIC/ZUXC	115,176	2,348	109.6
76.	Liuzhou Bailian Airport	Liuzhou	Guangxi	LZH/ZGZH	113,357	2,239	643.8
77.	Hailar Dongshan Airport	Hailar	Inner Mongolia	HLD/ZBLA	111,950	1,396	179.4
78.	Aksu Onsu Airport	Aksu	Xinjiang	AKU/ZWAK	101,936	2,464	318.7
79.	Jingdezhen Luojia Airport	Jingdezhen	Jiangxi	JDZ/ZSJD	95,938	1,456	1,746.5
80.	Lianyungang Baitabu Airport	Lianyungang	Jiangsu	LYG/ZSLG	82,290	2,434	499.6
81.	Nantong Xingdong Airport	Nantong	Jiangsu	NTG/ZSNT	82,077	1,758	964.0
82.	Luzhou Lantian Airport	Luzhou	Sichuan	LZO/ZULZ	82,024	1,438	1,031.9
83.	Hotan Airport	Hotan	Xinjiang	HTN/ZWTN	78,897	666	131.0
84.	Yulin Xisha Airport	Yulin	Shaanxi	UYN/ZLYL	75,959	2,798	64.9
85.	Luoyang Beijiao Airport	Luoyang	Henan	LYA/ZHLY	72,062	128,979	279.8
86.	Lincang Airport	Lincang	Yunnan	LNJ/ZPLC	70,249	702	215.9
87.	Wanzhou Wuqiao Airport	Wanzhou	Chongqing	WXN/ZULP	69,073	1,681	443.5
88.	Tongren Fenghuang Airport	Tongren	Guizhou	TEN/ZUTR	61,921	1,266	4.5
89.	Changde Taohuayuan Airport	Changde	Hunan	CGD/ZGCD	56,547	1,073	54.6
90.	Xiangyang Liuji Airport	Xiangyang	Hubei	XFN/ZHXF	55,087	852	131.1
91.	Baoshan Airport	Baoshan	Yunnan	BSD/ZPBS	52,828	696	178.3
92.	Linyi Shubuling Airport	Linyi	Shandong	LYI/ZSLY	52,523	1,802	407.8
93.	Enshi Xujiaping Airport	Enshi	Hubei	ENH/ZHES	49,553	1,544	53.3
94.	Qamdo Bangda Airport	Qamdo	Tibet	BPX/ZUBD	48,969	502	81.2
95.	Jiamusi Dongjiao Airport	Jiamusi	Heilongjiang	JMU/ZYJM	48,577	620	36.6
96.	Changzhi Wangcun Airport	Changzhi	Shanxi	CIH/ZBCZ	47,331	2,254	49.9
97.	Meixian Airport	Meizhou	Guangdong	MXZ/ZGMX	46,637	940	6.4
98.	Qiqihar Sanjiazi Airport	Qiqihar	Heilongjiang	NDG/ZYQQ	44,174	547	192.1
99.	Zhaotong Airport	Zhaotong	Yunnan	ZAT/ZPZT	37,935	578	188.3
100.	Hanzhong Airport	Hanzhong	Shaanxi	HZG/ZLHZ	37,351	1,512	48.2

=== 2003 final statistics ===
The 100 busiest airports in China in 2003 ordered by total passenger traffic, according to the CAAC report.

Rank	Airport	City served	Division	IATA/ ICAO	Passengers	Aircraft	Cargo
1.	Beijing Capital International Airport	Beijing	Beijing	PEK/ZBAA	24,283,818	233,776	662,746.2
2.	Shanghai Pudong International Airport	Shanghai	Shanghai	PVG/ZSPD	15,063,622	134,276	1,189,303.2
3.	Guangzhou Baiyun International Airport	Guangzhou	Guangdong	CAN/ZGGG	15,012,696	142,283	453,738.1
4.	Shenzhen Bao'an International Airport	Shenzhen	Guangdong	SZX/ZGSZ	10,842,652	119,523	353,597.0
5.	Shanghai Hongqiao International Airport	Shanghai	Shanghai	SHA/ZSSS	9,692,386	109,403	208,524.0
6.	Chengdu Shuangliu International Airport	Chengdu	Sichuan	CTU/ZUUU	8,196,742	83,102	177,310.2
7.	Kunming Wujiaba International Airport	Kunming	Yunnan	KMG/ZPPP	7,432,596	78,706	136,899.3
8.	Haikou Meilan International Airport	Haikou	Hainan	HAK/ZJHK	6,029,249	64,136	56,969.6
9.	Xi'an Xianyang International Airport	Xi'an, Xianyang	Shaanxi	XIY/ZLXY	4,397,991	60,183	62,858.8
10.	Hangzhou Xiaoshan International Airport	Hangzhou	Zhejiang	HGH/ZSHC	4,352,301	50,654	91,317.6
11.	Xiamen Gaoqi International Airport	Xiamen	Fujian	XMN/ZSAM	4,296,394	54,899	120,552.3
12.	Chongqing Jiangbei International Airport	Chongqing	Chongqing	CKG/ZUCK	4,287,505	56,108	76,921.5
13.	Qingdao Liuting International Airport	Qingdao	Shandong	TAO/ZSQD	3,491,026	45,394	54,590.1
14.	Dalian Zhoushuizi International Airport	Dalian	Liaoning	DLC/ZYTL	3,420,307	35,248	74,784.0
15.	Nanjing Lukou International Airport	Nanjing	Jiangsu	NKG/ZSNJ	3,329,477	39,589	80,677.5
16.	Wuhan Tianhe International Airport	Wuhan	Hubei	WUH/ZHHH	3,305,600	41,347	55,021.6
17.	Shenyang Taoxian International Airport	Shenyang	Liaoning	SHE/ZYTX	3,010,752	33,539	69,509.2
18.	Changsha Huanghua International Airport	Changsha	Hunan	CSX/ZGHA	2,992,543	46,993	34,987.5
19.	Ürümqi Diwopu International Airport	Ürümqi	Xinjiang	URC/ZWWW	2,619,411	33,445	47,986.8
20.	Fuzhou Changle International Airport	Fuzhou	Fujian	FOC/ZSFZ	2,543,718	33,450	46,787.0
21.	Harbin Taiping International Airport	Harbin	Heilongjiang	HRB/ZYHB	2,148,086	22,093	31,351.0
22.	Wenzhou Yongqiang International Airport	Wenzhou	Zhejiang	WNZ/ZSWZ	1,983,464	27,363	27,555.2
23.	Guiyang Longdongbao International Airport	Guiyang	Guizhou	KWE/ZUGY	1,976,768	25,972	24,106.0
24.	Guilin Liangjiang International Airport	Guilin	Guangxi	KWL/ZGKL	1,970,615	24,463	22,608.2
25.	Zhengzhou Xinzheng International Airport	Zhengzhou	Henan	CGO/ZHCC	1,868,550	24,340	22,402.0
26.	Jinan Yaoqiang International Airport	Jinan	Shandong	TNA/ZSJN	1,739,838	27,863	23,558.1
27.	Sanya Phoenix International Airport	Sanya	Hainan	SYX/ZJSY	1,694,298	15,611	11,033.5
28.	Ningbo Lishe International Airport	Ningbo	Zhejiang	NGB/ZSNB	1,300,934	16,048	19,878.7
29.	Changchun Longjia International Airport	Changchun	Jilin	CGQ/ZYCC	1,279,379	13,883	15,702.4
30.	Nanning Wuxu International Airport	Nanning	Guangxi	NNG/ZGNN	1,222,900	16,877	13,923.4
31.	Nanchang Changbei International Airport	Nanchang	Jiangxi	KHN/ZSCN	1,172,159	17,649	13,516.9
32.	Tianjin Binhai International Airport	Tianjin	Tianjin	TSN/ZBTJ	1,103,491	20,053	48,681.3
33.	Taiyuan Wusu International Airport	Taiyuan, Jinzhong	Shanxi	TYN/ZBYN	1,032,959	19,799	37,226.7
34.	Xishuangbanna Gasa Airport	Jinghong	Yunnan	JHG/ZPJH	951,341	9,257	3,886.9
35.	Hefei Luogang International Airport	Hefei	Anhui	HFE/ZSOF	929,053	12,210	13,271.5
36.	Quanzhou Jinjiang Airport	Quanzhou	Fujian	JJN/ZSQZ	893,023	9,449	10,682.5
37.	Lanzhou Zhongchuan Airport	Lanzhou	Gansu	LHW/ZLLL	804,955	13,637	10,444.6
38.	Yantai Laishan International Airport	Yantai	Shandong	YNT/ZSYT	746,105	11,266	9,571.3
39.	Shantou Waisha Airport	Shantou	Guangdong	SWA/ZGOW	691,935	9,202	7,982.8
40.	Zhangjiajie Hehua Airport	Zhangjiajie	Hunan	DYG/ZGDY	668,814	8,057	1,871.5
41.	Lhasa Gonggar Airport	Lhasa, Shannan	Tibet	LXA/ZULS	645,662	3,380	7,479.2
42.	Lijiang Sanyi Airport	Lijiang	Yunnan	LJG/ZPLJ	607,761	6,723	815.7
43.	Zhuhai Jinwan Airport	Zhuhai	Guangdong	ZUH/ZGSD	585,264	14,965	7,543.6
44.	Hohhot Baita International Airport	Hohhot	Inner Mongolia	HET/ZBHH	507,625	8,625	13,251.8
45.	Yinchuan Hedong Airport	Yinchuan	Ningxia	INC/ZLIC	445,745	8,899	3,590.7
46.	Wuyishan Airport	Wuyishan	Fujian	WUS/ZSWY	384,977	4,486	474.2
47.	Yanji Chaoyangchuan Airport	Yanji	Jilin	YNJ/ZYYJ	381,849	3,964	658.8
48.	Zhanjiang Airport	Zhanjiang	Guangdong	ZHA/ZGZJ	329,777	5,529	1,284.6
49.	Xining Caojiabu Airport	Xining, Haidong	Qinghai	XNN/ZLXN	320,227	7,088	2,617.7
50.	Zhoushan Putuoshan Airport	Zhoushan	Zhejiang	HSN/ZSZS	260,331	4,472	1,586.8
51.	Yichang Sanxia Airport	Yichang	Hubei	YIH/ZHYC	245,625	4,026	807.3
52.	Beihai Fucheng Airport	Beihai	Guangxi	BHY/ZGBH	240,101	3,321	905.8
53.	Huangshan Tunxi International Airport	Huangshan	Anhui	TXN/ZSTX	238,655	3,240	1,340.1
54.	Kashgar Airport	Kashgar	Xinjiang	KHG/ZWSH	216,946	1,696	748.1
55.	Dali Huangcaoba Airport	Dali	Yunnan	DLU/ZPDL	198,218	2,236	780.7
56.	Yining Airport	Yining	Xinjiang	YIN/ZWYN	193,502	3,042	169.4
57.	Shijiazhuang Zhengding International Airport	Shijiazhuang	Hebei	SJW/ZBSJ	192,426	6,269	26,479.3
58.	Baotou Erliban Airport	Baotou	Inner Mongolia	BAV/ZBOW	186,560	2,346	1,188.8
59.	Korla Airport	Korla	Xinjiang	KRL/ZWKL	181,401	3,389	90.0
60.	Jiuzhai Huanglong Airport	Jiuzhaigou	Sichuan	JZH/ZUJZ	174,456	1,607	18.8
61.	Changzhou Benniu Airport	Changzhou	Jiangsu	CZX/ZSCG	161,161	2,542	2,396.8
62.	Wanzhou Wuqiao Airport	Wanzhou	Chongqing	WXN/ZULP	151,717	2,921	448.2
63.	Dehong Mangshi Airport	Mangshi	Yunnan	LUM/ZPLX	150,593	1,558	1,221.3
64.	Taizhou Luqiao Airport	Taizhou	Zhejiang	HYN/ZSLQ	135,897	2,390	1,873.4
65.	Yiwu Airport	Yiwu	Zhejiang	YIW/ZSYW	129,914	1,747	2,039.6
66.	Yibin Caiba Airport	Yibin	Sichuan	YBP/ZUYB	128,673	2,106	1,702.6
67.	Diqing Shangri-La Airport	Shangri-La	Yunnan	DIG/ZPDQ	110,558	1,462	355.9
68.	Dunhuang Airport	Dunhuang	Gansu	DNH/ZLDH	95,490	1,914	34.6
69.	Mudanjiang Hailang Airport	Mudanjiang	Heilongjiang	MDG/ZYMD	91,694	1,110	346.3
70.	Mianyang Nanjiao Airport	Mianyang	Sichuan	MIG/ZUMY	89,055	1,198	1,407.3
71.	Pu'er Simao Airport	Pu'er	Yunnan	SYM/ZPSM	85,510	786	393.8
72.	Hailar Dongshan Airport	Hailar	Inner Mongolia	HLD/ZBLA	85,082	1,300	167.6
73.	Xuzhou Guanyin Airport	Xuzhou	Jiangsu	XUZ/ZSXZ	78,581	2,105	654.5
74.	Luzhou Lantian Airport	Luzhou	Sichuan	LZO/ZULZ	73,143	1,370	1,115.5
75.	Liuzhou Bailian Airport	Liuzhou	Guangxi	LZH/ZGZH	68,048	1,528	447.2
76.	Zhaotong Airport	Zhaotong	Yunnan	ZAT/ZPZT	66,920	809	191.9
77.	Lincang Airport	Lincang	Yunnan	LNJ/ZPLC	66,617	704	338.9
78.	Nantong Xingdong Airport	Nantong	Jiangsu	NTG/ZSNT	64,086	1,632	807.1
79.	Altay Airport	Altay City	Xinjiang	AAT/ZWAT	62,554	1,160	9.6
80.	Xichang Qingshan Airport	Xichang	Sichuan	XIC/ZUXC	58,193	1,491	69.6
81.	Aksu Onsu Airport	Aksu	Xinjiang	AKU/ZWAK	56,369	1,297	173.9
82.	Qamdo Bangda Airport	Qamdo	Tibet	BPX/ZUBD	53,939	542	69.1
83.	Weihai Dashuibo Airport	Weihai	Shandong	WEH/ZSWH	52,848	948	347.4
84.	Luoyang Beijiao Airport	Luoyang	Henan	LYA/ZHLY	48,470	115,650	259.3
85.	Enshi Xujiaping Airport	Enshi	Hubei	ENH/ZHES	47,355	1,689	52.8
86.	Changde Taohuayuan Airport	Changde	Hunan	CGD/ZGCD	46,198	947	26.0
87.	Linyi Shubuling Airport	Linyi	Shandong	LYI/ZSLY	45,102	4,330	396.2
88.	Lianyungang Baitabu Airport	Lianyungang	Jiangsu	LYG/ZSLG	44,527	1,704	444.3
89.	Meixian Airport	Meizhou	Guangdong	MXZ/ZGMX	44,003	618	10.4
90.	Yulin Xisha Airport	Yulin	Shaanxi	UYN/ZLYL	43,814	1,448	67.0
91.	Baoshan Airport	Baoshan	Yunnan	BSD/ZPBS	42,239	682	221.4
92.	Tongren Fenghuang Airport	Tongren	Guizhou	TEN/ZUTR	41,510	1,159	7.0
93.	Qiqihar Sanjiazi Airport	Qiqihar	Heilongjiang	NDG/ZYQQ	32,485	496	92.6
94.	Jingdezhen Luojia Airport	Jingdezhen	Jiangxi	JDZ/ZSJD	30,799	996	218.7
95.	Jiamusi Dongjiao Airport	Jiamusi	Heilongjiang	JMU/ZYJM	29,912	411	19.7
96.	Ganzhou Huangjin Airport	Ganzhou	Jiangxi	KOW/ZSGZ	28,571	1,046	52.5
97.	Jilin Ertaizi Airport	Jilin City	Jilin	JIL/ZYJL	28,160	398	52.8
98.	Chifeng Airport	Chifeng	Inner Mongolia	CIF/ZBCF	26,100	988	25.5
99.	Dandong Langtou Airport	Dandong	Liaoning	DDG/ZYDD	24,997	286	322.4
100.	Xiangyang Liuji Airport	Xiangyang	Hubei	XFN/ZHXF	24,438	478	35.2

=== 2002 final statistics ===
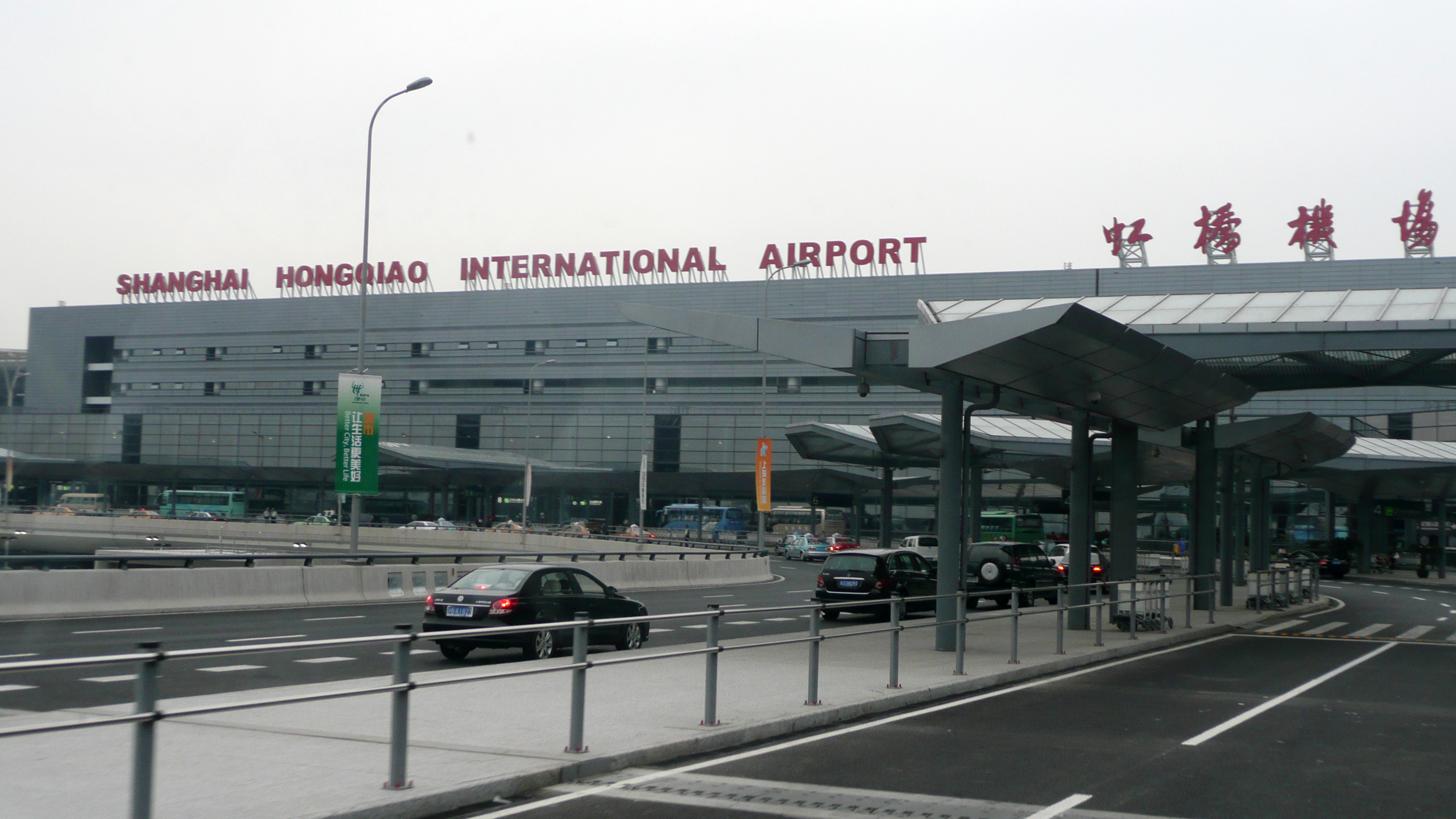
2002 was the last year Shanghai Hongqiao International Airport was ranked as the country's third busiest by passenger traffic. Since then, the airport has maintained a stable growth but it has been surpassed by other airports including Shanghai Pudong Airport as the busiest in Shanghai city.

The 100 busiest airports in China in 2002 ordered by total passenger traffic, according to the CAAC report.

Rank	Airport	City served	Division	IATA/ ICAO	Passengers	Aircraft	Cargo
1.	Beijing Capital International Airport	Beijing	Beijing	PEK/ZBAA	27,159,665	242,338	629,045.2
2.	Guangzhou Baiyun International Airport	Guangzhou	Guangdong	CAN/ZGGG	16,014,411	147,740	496,879.7
3.	Shanghai Hongqiao International Airport	Shanghai	Shanghai	SHA/ZSSS	13,667,094	117,875	439,904.7
4.	Shanghai Pudong International Airport	Shanghai	Shanghai	PVG/ZSPD	11,047,695	107,335	634,965.7
5.	Shenzhen Bao'an International Airport	Shenzhen	Guangdong	SZX/ZGSZ	9,352,662	106,718	288,644.3
6.	Chengdu Shuangliu International Airport	Chengdu	Sichuan	CTU/ZUUU	7,548,680	77,844	162,390.7
7.	Kunming Wujiaba International Airport	Kunming	Yunnan	KMG/ZPPP	7,087,156	79,937	122,488.2
8.	Haikou Meilan International Airport	Haikou	Hainan	HAK/ZJHK	5,600,511	62,498	53,829.1
9.	Xi'an Xianyang International Airport	Xi'an, Xianyang	Shaanxi	XIY/ZLXY	4,433,604	68,164	65,292.4
10.	Xiamen Gaoqi International Airport	Xiamen	Fujian	XMN/ZSAM	4,258,635	52,889	109,984.1
11.	Hangzhou Xiaoshan International Airport	Hangzhou	Zhejiang	HGH/ZSHC	3,879,259	44,912	86,734.2
12.	Chongqing Jiangbei International Airport	Chongqing	Chongqing	CKG/ZUCK	3,865,788	49,012	71,464.9
13.	Dalian Zhoushuizi International Airport	Dalian	Liaoning	DLC/ZYTL	3,333,451	37,534	72,583.1
14.	Qingdao Liuting International Airport	Qingdao	Shandong	TAO/ZSQD	3,219,860	43,025	46,298.9
15.	Wuhan Tianhe International Airport	Wuhan	Hubei	WUH/ZHHH	3,200,864	48,831	51,881.5
16.	Nanjing Lukou International Airport	Nanjing	Jiangsu	NKG/ZSNJ	3,170,346	37,776	52,197.7
17.	Guilin Liangjiang International Airport	Guilin	Guangxi	KWL/ZGKL	2,671,961	33,417	34,631.2
18.	Shenyang Taoxian International Airport	Shenyang	Liaoning	SHE/ZYTX	2,652,340	32,550	56,798.7
19.	Changsha Huanghua International Airport	Changsha	Hunan	CSX/ZGHA	2,598,508	42,920	25,437.9
20.	Fuzhou Changle International Airport	Fuzhou	Fujian	FOC/ZSFZ	2,445,025	32,177	48,242.2
21.	Harbin Taiping International Airport	Harbin	Heilongjiang	HRB/ZYHB	1,958,253	21,723	28,083.4
22.	Wenzhou Yongqiang International Airport	Wenzhou	Zhejiang	WNZ/ZSWZ	1,913,201	25,747	28,386.9
23.	Ürümqi Diwopu International Airport	Ürümqi	Xinjiang	URC/ZWWW	1,784,351	20,463	42,960.9
24.	Guiyang Longdongbao International Airport	Guiyang	Guizhou	KWE/ZUGY	1,748,848	25,040	23,308.3
25.	Zhengzhou Xinzheng International Airport	Zhengzhou	Henan	CGO/ZHCC	1,667,681	23,398	20,984.7
26.	Jinan Yaoqiang International Airport	Jinan	Shandong	TNA/ZSJN	1,589,521	26,191	23,983.9
27.	Sanya Phoenix International Airport	Sanya	Hainan	SYX/ZJSY	1,491,558	18,219	10,941.3
28.	Ningbo Lishe International Airport	Ningbo	Zhejiang	NGB/ZSNB	1,265,057	16,325	18,660.7
29.	Changchun Longjia International Airport	Changchun	Jilin	CGQ/ZYCC	1,224,461	14,832	14,737.3
30.	Tianjin Binhai International Airport	Tianjin	Tianjin	TSN/ZBTJ	1,092,121	19,681	41,721.5
31.	Nanning Wuxu International Airport	Nanning	Guangxi	NNG/ZGNN	1,032,327	15,992	12,129.2
32.	Nanchang Changbei International Airport	Nanchang	Jiangxi	KHN/ZSCN	991,078	16,182	9,280.8
33.	Xishuangbanna Gasa Airport	Jinghong	Yunnan	JHG/ZPJH	900,409	9,400	5,690.3
34.	Taiyuan Wusu International Airport	Taiyuan, Jinzhong	Shanxi	TYN/ZBYN	817,668	17,594	38,015.6
35.	Hefei Luogang International Airport	Hefei	Anhui	HFE/ZSOF	813,381	13,742	13,170.5
36.	Shantou Waisha Airport	Shantou	Guangdong	SWA/ZGOW	806,690	11,524	9,856.1
37.	Yantai Laishan International Airport	Yantai	Shandong	YNT/ZSYT	754,071	12,000	9,556.7
38.	Lijiang Sanyi Airport	Lijiang	Yunnan	LJG/ZPLJ	752,831	9,021	1,149.9
39.	Zhuhai Jinwan Airport	Zhuhai	Guangdong	ZUH/ZGSD	744,110	23,260	8,159.9
40.	Zhangjiajie Hehua Airport	Zhangjiajie	Hunan	DYG/ZGDY	713,188	9,982	1,936.6
41.	Lanzhou Zhongchuan Airport	Lanzhou	Gansu	LHW/ZLLL	701,423	12,222	9,480.9
42.	Quanzhou Jinjiang Airport	Quanzhou	Fujian	JJN/ZSQZ	690,792	7,688	8,948.4
43.	Lhasa Gonggar Airport	Lhasa, Shannan	Tibet	LXA/ZULS	656,394	3,351	9,071.1
44.	Hohhot Baita International Airport	Hohhot	Inner Mongolia	HET/ZBHH	477,233	8,703	10,268.8
45.	Yanji Chaoyangchuan Airport	Yanji	Jilin	YNJ/ZYYJ	430,695	4,535	969.7
46.	Huangshan Tunxi International Airport	Huangshan	Anhui	TXN/ZSTX	410,814	6,306	2,448.2
47.	Dali Huangcaoba Airport	Dali	Yunnan	DLU/ZPDL	361,726	4,667	1,348.3
48.	Wuyishan Airport	Wuyishan	Fujian	WUS/ZSWY	361,674	4,742	483.6
49.	Yinchuan Hedong Airport	Yinchuan	Ningxia	INC/ZLIC	357,663	9,660	3,048.2
50.	Zhanjiang Airport	Zhanjiang	Guangdong	ZHA/ZGZJ	348,997	6,377	1,840.1
51.	Beihai Fucheng Airport	Beihai	Guangxi	BHY/ZGBH	345,918	5,439	2,698.7
52.	Zhoushan Putuoshan Airport	Zhoushan	Zhejiang	HSN/ZSZS	301,909	5,148	1,888.2
53.	Xining Caojiabu Airport	Xining, Haidong	Qinghai	XNN/ZLXN	294,999	7,612	1,826.5
54.	Yichang Sanxia Airport	Yichang	Hubei	YIH/ZHYC	291,410	4,766	1,226.7
55.	Beijing Nanyuan Airport	Beijing	Beijing	NAY/ZBNY	203,765	2,478	0.0
56.	Shijiazhuang Zhengding International Airport	Shijiazhuang	Hebei	SJW/ZBSJ	167,326	4,658	27,630.9
57.	Kashgar Airport	Kashgar	Xinjiang	KHG/ZWSH	163,688	1,127	536.5
58.	Dehong Mangshi Airport	Mangshi	Yunnan	LUM/ZPLX	157,449	1,625	1,452.1
59.	Baotou Erliban Airport	Baotou	Inner Mongolia	BAV/ZBOW	152,817	2,202	1,062.9
60.	Changzhou Benniu Airport	Changzhou	Jiangsu	CZX/ZSCG	148,848	2,232	2,339.5
61.	Dunhuang Airport	Dunhuang	Gansu	DNH/ZLDH	145,152	3,026	47.0
62.	Taizhou Luqiao Airport	Taizhou	Zhejiang	HYN/ZSLQ	134,338	2,178	2,368.1
63.	Yiwu Airport	Yiwu	Zhejiang	YIW/ZSYW	129,394	1,830	1,605.7
64.	Diqing Shangri-La Airport	Shangri-La	Yunnan	DIG/ZPDQ	124,501	1,504	331.2
65.	Mianyang Nanjiao Airport	Mianyang	Sichuan	MIG/ZUMY	116,287	1,910	2,305.1
66.	Yibin Caiba Airport	Yibin	Sichuan	YBP/ZUYB	111,304	1,880	1,990.2
67.	Yining Airport	Yining	Xinjiang	YIN/ZWYN	100,644	1,292	112.9
68.	Foshan Shadi Airport	Foshan	Guangdong	FUO/ZGFS	95,207	1,110	0.0
69.	Mudanjiang Hailang Airport	Mudanjiang	Heilongjiang	MDG/ZYMD	93,019	1,338	360.6
70.	Hailar Dongshan Airport	Hailar	Inner Mongolia	HLD/ZBLA	85,649	1,572	138.3
71.	Xuzhou Guanyin Airport	Xuzhou	Jiangsu	XUZ/ZSXZ	85,148	3,030	802.9
72.	Pu'er Simao Airport	Pu'er	Yunnan	SYM/ZPSM	79,849	815	353.6
73.	Nantong Xingdong Airport	Nantong	Jiangsu	NTG/ZSNT	68,712	1,587	945.8
74.	Luzhou Lantian Airport	Luzhou	Sichuan	LZO/ZULZ	67,441	1,233	1,091.8
75.	Zhaotong Airport	Zhaotong	Yunnan	ZAT/ZPZT	62,725	920	182.5
76.	Linyi Shubuling Airport	Linyi	Shandong	LYI/ZSLY	62,035	6,838	595.4
77.	Lincang Airport	Lincang	Yunnan	LNJ/ZPLC	60,908	892	56.4
78.	Baoshan Airport	Baoshan	Yunnan	BSD/ZPBS	55,782	898	176.4
79.	Tongren Fenghuang Airport	Tongren	Guizhou	TEN/ZUTR	54,344	954	33.9
80.	Liuzhou Bailian Airport	Liuzhou	Guangxi	LZH/ZGZH	52,783	1,262	199.7
81.	Qamdo Bangda Airport	Qamdo	Tibet	BPX/ZUBD	50,141	514	90.8
82.	Weihai Dashuibo Airport	Weihai	Shandong	WEH/ZSWH	45,407	1,338	280.5
83.	Xichang Qingshan Airport	Xichang	Sichuan	XIC/ZUXC	44,522	1,116	98.8
84.	Luoyang Beijiao Airport	Luoyang	Henan	LYA/ZHLY	43,478	128,633	259.3
85.	Meixian Airport	Meizhou	Guangdong	MXZ/ZGMX	43,244	616	11.6
86.	Jilin Ertaizi Airport	Jilin City	Jilin	JIL/ZYJL	36,197	466	79.1
87.	Enshi Xujiaping Airport	Enshi	Hubei	ENH/ZHES	35,861	1,303	44.8
88.	Yulin Xisha Airport	Yulin	Shaanxi	UYN/ZLYL	35,537	1,238	70.5
89.	Lianyungang Baitabu Airport	Lianyungang	Jiangsu	LYG/ZSLG	35,341	1,446	415.4
90.	Hangzhou Jianqiao Airport	Hangzhou	Zhejiang	-/-	35,143	398	0.0
91.	Altay Airport	Altay City	Xinjiang	AAT/ZWAT	35,106	674	6.1
92.	Weifang Airport	Weifang	Shandong	WEF/ZSWF	34,646	1,086	95.7
93.	Qiqihar Sanjiazi Airport	Qiqihar	Heilongjiang	NDG/ZYQQ	33,639	954	126.2
94.	Ganzhou Huangjin Airport	Ganzhou	Jiangxi	KOW/ZSGZ	33,513	1,120	31.1
95.	Korla Airport	Korla	Xinjiang	KRL/ZWKL	32,721	392	0.0
96.	Dandong Langtou Airport	Dandong	Liaoning	DDG/ZYDD	31,506	426	293.2
97.	Jingdezhen Luojia Airport	Jingdezhen	Jiangxi	JDZ/ZSJD	30,303	1,070	40.2
98.	Changde Taohuayuan Airport	Changde	Hunan	CGD/ZGCD	29,913	827	29.0
99.	Xilinhot Airport	Xilinhot	Inner Mongolia	XIL/ZBXH	29,545	944	10.4
100.	Yinchuan Helanshan Airport	Yinchuan	Ningxia	INC/ZLIC	28,667	312	0.0

=== 2001 final statistics ===
The 100 busiest airports in China in 2001 ordered by total passenger traffic, according to the CAAC report.

Rank	Airport	City served	Division	IATA/ ICAO	Passengers	Aircraft	Cargo
1.	Beijing Capital International Airport	Beijing	Beijing	PEK/ZBAA	24,176,495	221,648	591,195.1
2.	Guangzhou Baiyun International Airport	Guangzhou	Guangdong	CAN/ZGGG	13,829,250	137,355	456,270.1
3.	Shanghai Hongqiao International Airport	Shanghai	Shanghai	SHA/ZSSS	13,761,410	116,495	451,923.7
4.	Shenzhen Bao'an International Airport	Shenzhen	Guangdong	SZX/ZGSZ	7,774,969	87,875	211,553.5
5.	Shanghai Pudong International Airport	Shanghai	Shanghai	PVG/ZSPD	6,898,999	77,575	352,541.4
6.	Kunming Wujiaba International Airport	Kunming	Yunnan	KMG/ZPPP	6,446,539	71,429	107,526.4
7.	Chengdu Shuangliu International Airport	Chengdu	Sichuan	CTU/ZUUU	6,244,726	66,539	143,489.1
8.	Haikou Meilan International Airport	Haikou	Hainan	HAK/ZJHK	5,078,532	53,786	54,128.0
9.	Xi'an Xianyang International Airport	Xi'an, Xianyang	Shaanxi	XIY/ZLXY	4,071,658	61,109	55,005.9
10.	Xiamen Gaoqi International Airport	Xiamen	Fujian	XMN/ZSAM	3,587,158	44,362	77,975.7
11.	Chongqing Jiangbei International Airport	Chongqing	Chongqing	CKG/ZUCK	3,192,759	41,192	64,597.1
12.	Dalian Zhoushuizi International Airport	Dalian	Liaoning	DLC/ZYTL	3,064,040	36,166	62,143.8
13.	Hangzhou Xiaoshan International Airport	Hangzhou	Zhejiang	HGH/ZSHC	2,981,341	36,475	73,148.0
14.	Qingdao Liuting International Airport	Qingdao	Shandong	TAO/ZSQD	2,810,093	39,868	36,157.3
15.	Nanjing Lukou International Airport	Nanjing	Jiangsu	NKG/ZSNJ	2,793,706	36,207	49,689.9
16.	Wuhan Tianhe International Airport	Wuhan	Hubei	WUH/ZHHH	2,744,146	47,288	44,506.6
17.	Shenyang Taoxian International Airport	Shenyang	Liaoning	SHE/ZYTX	2,476,245	28,460	45,251.7
18.	Guilin Liangjiang International Airport	Guilin	Guangxi	KWL/ZGKL	2,436,795	32,321	25,800.4
19.	Fuzhou Changle International Airport	Fuzhou	Fujian	FOC/ZSFZ	2,278,246	31,651	41,371.8
20.	Changsha Huanghua International Airport	Changsha	Hunan	CSX/ZGHA	2,217,088	39,194	20,375.2
21.	Harbin Taiping International Airport	Harbin	Heilongjiang	HRB/ZYHB	1,702,963	20,169	23,762.2
22.	Wenzhou Yongqiang International Airport	Wenzhou	Zhejiang	WNZ/ZSWZ	1,549,654	22,795	22,667.8
23.	Ürümqi Diwopu International Airport	Ürümqi	Xinjiang	URC/ZWWW	1,530,076	15,501	37,686.9
24.	Guiyang Longdongbao International Airport	Guiyang	Guizhou	KWE/ZUGY	1,529,857	21,986	17,110.6
25.	Zhengzhou Xinzheng International Airport	Zhengzhou	Henan	CGO/ZHCC	1,523,442	22,897	18,975.4
26.	Jinan Yaoqiang International Airport	Jinan	Shandong	TNA/ZSJN	1,337,148	24,726	22,367.2
27.	Ningbo Lishe International Airport	Ningbo	Zhejiang	NGB/ZSNB	1,219,045	17,606	15,004.9
28.	Changchun Longjia International Airport	Changchun	Jilin	CGQ/ZYCC	1,093,439	12,907	12,583.3
29.	Sanya Phoenix International Airport	Sanya	Hainan	SYX/ZJSY	987,508	13,964	5,775.2
30.	Tianjin Binhai International Airport	Tianjin	Tianjin	TSN/ZBTJ	941,178	20,062	36,503.4
31.	Nanning Wuxu International Airport	Nanning	Guangxi	NNG/ZGNN	922,017	15,520	10,631.7
32.	Xishuangbanna Gasa Airport	Jinghong	Yunnan	JHG/ZPJH	922,006	9,240	5,481.6
33.	Nanchang Changbei International Airport	Nanchang	Jiangxi	KHN/ZSCN	884,096	15,656	7,666.6
34.	Shantou Waisha Airport	Shantou	Guangdong	SWA/ZGOW	870,084	12,869	11,398.4
35.	Hefei Luogang International Airport	Hefei	Anhui	HFE/ZSOF	697,268	13,748	10,297.9
36.	Yantai Laishan International Airport	Yantai	Shandong	YNT/ZSYT	667,790	10,685	7,594.7
37.	Zhangjiajie Hehua Airport	Zhangjiajie	Hunan	DYG/ZGDY	664,796	9,486	1,149.2
38.	Lanzhou Zhongchuan Airport	Lanzhou	Gansu	LHW/ZLLL	664,082	11,623	9,250.4
39.	Zhuhai Jinwan Airport	Zhuhai	Guangdong	ZUH/ZGSD	603,837	23,298	7,785.0
40.	Taiyuan Wusu International Airport	Taiyuan, Jinzhong	Shanxi	TYN/ZBYN	580,634	16,037	51,168.8
41.	Lijiang Sanyi Airport	Lijiang	Yunnan	LJG/ZPLJ	541,966	5,956	473.8
42.	Lhasa Gonggar Airport	Lhasa, Shannan	Tibet	LXA/ZULS	540,923	3,218	6,881.1
43.	Quanzhou Jinjiang Airport	Quanzhou	Fujian	JJN/ZSQZ	481,301	6,043	6,272.6
44.	Hohhot Baita International Airport	Hohhot	Inner Mongolia	HET/ZBHH	448,246	9,141	4,656.9
45.	Yanji Chaoyangchuan Airport	Yanji	Jilin	YNJ/ZYYJ	383,712	4,466	781.0
46.	Huangshan Tunxi International Airport	Huangshan	Anhui	TXN/ZSTX	372,970	6,100	1,019.3
47.	Zhanjiang Airport	Zhanjiang	Guangdong	ZHA/ZGZJ	321,482	6,701	2,005.9
48.	Beihai Fucheng Airport	Beihai	Guangxi	BHY/ZGBH	317,439	5,531	2,469.9
49.	Wuyishan Airport	Wuyishan	Fujian	WUS/ZSWY	294,295	3,985	235.9
50.	Dali Huangcaoba Airport	Dali	Yunnan	DLU/ZPDL	286,168	3,329	803.4
51.	Yinchuan Hedong Airport	Yinchuan	Ningxia	INC/ZLIC	274,715	6,176	1,604.2
52.	Beijing Nanyuan Airport	Beijing	Beijing	NAY/ZBNY	265,714	3,185	0.0
53.	Zhoushan Putuoshan Airport	Zhoushan	Zhejiang	HSN/ZSZS	250,683	3,684	1,855.3
54.	Xining Caojiabu Airport	Xining, Haidong	Qinghai	XNN/ZLXN	250,561	5,422	1,574.3
55.	Yichang Sanxia Airport	Yichang	Hubei	YIH/ZHYC	202,471	4,496	1,195.8
56.	Shijiazhuang Zhengding International Airport	Shijiazhuang	Hebei	SJW/ZBSJ	192,859	7,594	39,726.3
57.	Dehong Mangshi Airport	Mangshi	Yunnan	LUM/ZPLX	163,912	1,482	1,718.4
58.	Dunhuang Airport	Dunhuang	Gansu	DNH/ZLDH	158,883	3,388	71.0
59.	Taizhou Luqiao Airport	Taizhou	Zhejiang	HYN/ZSLQ	148,118	2,922	1,927.4
60.	Baotou Erliban Airport	Baotou	Inner Mongolia	BAV/ZBOW	142,336	2,224	937.3
61.	Kashgar Airport	Kashgar	Xinjiang	KHG/ZWSH	129,000	1,033	445.6
62.	Changzhou Benniu Airport	Changzhou	Jiangsu	CZX/ZSCG	126,471	2,058	2,586.0
63.	Foshan Shadi Airport	Foshan	Guangdong	FUO/ZGFS	122,928	1,394	0.0
64.	Yibin Caiba Airport	Yibin	Sichuan	YBP/ZUYB	118,927	1,932	2,061.4
65.	Yiwu Airport	Yiwu	Zhejiang	YIW/ZSYW	105,372	1,591	1,129.7
66.	Diqing Shangri-La Airport	Shangri-La	Yunnan	DIG/ZPDQ	98,681	1,236	402.7
67.	Yining Airport	Yining	Xinjiang	YIN/ZWYN	82,107	1,012	93.6
68.	Hailar Dongshan Airport	Hailar	Inner Mongolia	HLD/ZBLA	77,754	1,468	129.4
69.	Luzhou Lantian Airport	Luzhou	Sichuan	LZO/ZULZ	73,721	1,388	1,190.5
70.	Nantong Xingdong Airport	Nantong	Jiangsu	NTG/ZSNT	73,509	1,454	1,158.0
71.	Mudanjiang Hailang Airport	Mudanjiang	Heilongjiang	MDG/ZYMD	72,923	1,275	353.5
72.	Xuzhou Guanyin Airport	Xuzhou	Jiangsu	XUZ/ZSXZ	71,166	1,872	908.9
73.	Weihai Dashuibo Airport	Weihai	Shandong	WEH/ZSWH	70,507	1,882	325.3
74.	Baoshan Airport	Baoshan	Yunnan	BSD/ZPBS	66,849	719	270.3
75.	Mianyang Nanjiao Airport	Mianyang	Sichuan	MIG/ZUMY	64,854	800	842.7
76.	Zhaotong Airport	Zhaotong	Yunnan	ZAT/ZPZT	58,929	686	206.4
77.	Linyi Shubuling Airport	Linyi	Shandong	LYI/ZSLY	57,606	5,779	566.1
78.	Luoyang Beijiao Airport	Luoyang	Henan	LYA/ZHLY	50,534	145,510	296.8
79.	Enshi Xujiaping Airport	Enshi	Hubei	ENH/ZHES	48,713	1,689	50.8
80.	Liuzhou Bailian Airport	Liuzhou	Guangxi	LZH/ZGZH	47,684	803	137.8
81.	Jilin Ertaizi Airport	Jilin City	Jilin	JIL/ZYJL	46,188	788	95.7
82.	Hangzhou Jianqiao Airport	Hangzhou	Zhejiang	-/-	44,586	498	0.0
83.	Qamdo Bangda Airport	Qamdo	Tibet	BPX/ZUBD	43,461	512	78.7
84.	Korla Airport	Korla	Xinjiang	KRL/ZWKL	42,652	502	0.0
85.	Lianyungang Baitabu Airport	Lianyungang	Jiangsu	LYG/ZSLG	39,742	1,278	511.8
86.	Meixian Airport	Meizhou	Guangdong	MXZ/ZGMX	38,813	548	23.1
87.	Fuzhou Yixu Airport	Fuzhou	Fujian	-/-	38,222	298	0.0
88.	Yinchuan Helanshan Airport	Yinchuan	Ningxia	INC/ZLIC	37,234	404	0.0
89.	Wuxi Shuofang Airport	Wuxi	Jiangsu	WUX/ZSWX	36,259	500	0.0
90.	Xiangyang Liuji Airport	Xiangyang	Hubei	XFN/ZHXF	35,819	875	216.9
91.	Tongren Fenghuang Airport	Tongren	Guizhou	TEN/ZUTR	33,280	487	9.6
92.	Xichang Qingshan Airport	Xichang	Sichuan	XIC/ZUXC	32,602	817	82.7
93.	Guilin Qifengling Airport	Guilin	Guangxi	-/-	32,565	400	0.0
94.	Chifeng Airport	Chifeng	Inner Mongolia	CIF/ZBCF	31,637	1,298	38.2
95.	Dandong Langtou Airport	Dandong	Liaoning	DDG/ZYDD	30,601	540	263.7
96.	Jingdezhen Luojia Airport	Jingdezhen	Jiangxi	JDZ/ZSJD	30,477	904	65.5
97.	Yulin Xisha Airport	Yulin	Shaanxi	UYN/ZLYL	30,182	1,224	50.0
98.	Weifang Airport	Weifang	Shandong	WEF/ZSWF	27,873	882	22.6
99.	Ganzhou Huangjin Airport	Ganzhou	Jiangxi	KOW/ZSGZ	26,942	714	20.5
100.	Aksu Onsu Airport	Aksu	Xinjiang	AKU/ZWAK	26,324	1,216	89.3

=== 2000 final statistics ===
The 100 busiest airports in China in 2000 ordered by total passenger traffic, according to the CAAC report.

Rank	Airport	City served	Division	IATA/ ICAO	Passengers	Aircraft	Cargo
1.	Beijing Capital International Airport	Beijing	Beijing	PEK/ZBAA	21,691,077	187,070	557,362.1
2.	Guangzhou Baiyun International Airport	Guangzhou	Guangdong	CAN/ZGGG	12,790,999	132,776	422,425.3
3.	Shanghai Hongqiao International Airport	Shanghai	Shanghai	SHA/ZSSS	12,139,462	102,222	492,292.0
4.	Shenzhen Bao'an International Airport	Shenzhen	Guangdong	SZX/ZGSZ	6,422,685	74,251	172,038.6
5.	Kunming Wujiaba International Airport	Kunming	Yunnan	KMG/ZPPP	5,604,090	68,642	98,360.9
6.	Shanghai Pudong International Airport	Shanghai	Shanghai	PVG/ZSPD	5,543,667	58,306	215,859.5
7.	Chengdu Shuangliu International Airport	Chengdu	Sichuan	CTU/ZUUU	5,524,709	58,614	124,421.3
8.	Haikou Meilan International Airport	Haikou	Hainan	HAK/ZJHK	4,362,743	56,767	53,634.5
9.	Xi'an Xianyang International Airport	Xi'an, Xianyang	Shaanxi	XIY/ZLXY	3,878,988	51,473	47,236.8
10.	Xiamen Gaoqi International Airport	Xiamen	Fujian	XMN/ZSAM	3,551,531	44,505	75,510.2
11.	Chongqing Jiangbei International Airport	Chongqing	Chongqing	CKG/ZUCK	2,780,359	36,405	62,214.5
12.	Dalian Zhoushuizi International Airport	Dalian	Liaoning	DLC/ZYTL	2,751,613	34,429	60,168.1
13.	Hangzhou Jianqiao Airport	Hangzhou	Zhejiang	-/-	2,492,442	26,448	63,039.2
14.	Nanjing Lukou International Airport	Nanjing	Jiangsu	NKG/ZSNJ	2,436,455	34,055	42,252.0
15.	Qingdao Liuting International Airport	Qingdao	Shandong	TAO/ZSQD	2,431,490	33,158	34,420.3
16.	Shenyang Taoxian International Airport	Shenyang	Liaoning	SHE/ZYTX	2,420,455	23,876	39,603.4
17.	Guilin Liangjiang International Airport	Guilin	Guangxi	KWL/ZGKL	2,316,011	33,439	22,005.1
18.	Fuzhou Changle International Airport	Fuzhou	Fujian	FOC/ZSFZ	2,158,994	28,996	39,462.1
19.	Changsha Huanghua International Airport	Changsha	Hunan	CSX/ZGHA	2,034,526	37,722	18,552.0
20.	Wuhan Tianhe International Airport	Wuhan	Hubei	WUH/ZHHH	1,756,733	34,158	26,918.0
21.	Wenzhou Yongqiang International Airport	Wenzhou	Zhejiang	WNZ/ZSWZ	1,756,733	34,158	26,918.0
22.	Ürümqi Diwopu International Airport	Ürümqi	Xinjiang	URC/ZWWW	1,597,575	15,360	39,659.4
23.	Harbin Taiping International Airport	Harbin	Heilongjiang	HRB/ZYHB	1,574,980	18,418	21,828.3
24.	Zhengzhou Xinzheng International Airport	Zhengzhou	Henan	CGO/ZHCC	1,516,658	22,945	20,080.7
25.	Guiyang Longdongbao International Airport	Guiyang	Guizhou	KWE/ZUGY	1,389,477	21,286	14,312.3
26.	Jinan Yaoqiang International Airport	Jinan	Shandong	TNA/ZSJN	1,212,129	18,585	20,055.3
27.	Ningbo Lishe International Airport	Ningbo	Zhejiang	NGB/ZSNB	1,179,888	16,271	16,557.3
28.	Shantou Waisha Airport	Shantou	Guangdong	SWA/ZGOW	1,119,825	15,023	14,138.1
29.	Changchun Longjia International Airport	Changchun	Jilin	CGQ/ZYCC	967,263	11,308	10,792.8
30.	Tianjin Binhai International Airport	Tianjin	Tianjin	TSN/ZBTJ	884,448	19,677	44,387.1
31.	Xishuangbanna Gasa Airport	Jinghong	Yunnan	JHG/ZPJH	853,824	8,458	7,085.1
32.	Nanning Wuxu International Airport	Nanning	Guangxi	NNG/ZGNN	808,198	13,477	10,423.8
33.	Nanchang Changbei International Airport	Nanchang	Jiangxi	KHN/ZSCN	783,419	13,242	5,930.7
34.	Lanzhou Zhongchuan Airport	Lanzhou	Gansu	LHW/ZLLL	679,142	12,907	6,041.3
35.	Yantai Laishan International Airport	Yantai	Shandong	YNT/ZSYT	661,637	10,040	7,865.4
36.	Sanya Phoenix International Airport	Sanya	Hainan	SYX/ZJSY	654,473	9,987	4,112.4
37.	Hefei Luogang International Airport	Hefei	Anhui	HFE/ZSOF	612,169	11,634	8,920.9
38.	Zhuhai Jinwan Airport	Zhuhai	Guangdong	ZUH/ZGSD	558,485	17,369	5,667.0
39.	Zhangjiajie Hehua Airport	Zhangjiajie	Hunan	DYG/ZGDY	547,037	7,790	415.0
40.	Lhasa Gonggar Airport	Lhasa, Shannan	Tibet	LXA/ZULS	489,534	2,607	7,727.4
41.	Taiyuan Wusu International Airport	Taiyuan, Jinzhong	Shanxi	TYN/ZBYN	460,824	11,323	38,902.9
42.	Lijiang Sanyi Airport	Lijiang	Yunnan	LJG/ZPLJ	436,905	4,836	496.8
43.	Beihai Fucheng Airport	Beihai	Guangxi	BHY/ZGBH	377,607	6,711	2,356.0
44.	Hohhot Baita International Airport	Hohhot	Inner Mongolia	HET/ZBHH	376,963	6,477	11,628.3
45.	Yanji Chaoyangchuan Airport	Yanji	Jilin	YNJ/ZYYJ	363,424	4,194	1,015.2
46.	Quanzhou Jinjiang Airport	Quanzhou	Fujian	JJN/ZSQZ	360,662	5,249	5,139.3
47.	Huangshan Tunxi International Airport	Huangshan	Anhui	TXN/ZSTX	334,316	6,002	973.6
48.	Zhanjiang Airport	Zhanjiang	Guangdong	ZHA/ZGZJ	334,146	7,802	2,049.0
49.	Yinchuan Hedong Airport	Yinchuan	Ningxia	INC/ZLIC	257,578	7,257	1,551.6
50.	Dali Huangcaoba Airport	Dali	Yunnan	DLU/ZPDL	252,934	2,978	502.0
51.	Wuyishan Airport	Wuyishan	Fujian	WUS/ZSWY	252,673	3,440	248.6
52.	Taizhou Luqiao Airport	Taizhou	Zhejiang	HYN/ZSLQ	223,780	3,270	2,586.4
53.	Shijiazhuang Zhengding International Airport	Shijiazhuang	Hebei	SJW/ZBSJ	205,265	7,640	29,918.3
54.	Xining Caojiabu Airport	Xining, Haidong	Qinghai	XNN/ZLXN	200,931	3,056	1,288.6
55.	Changzhou Benniu Airport	Changzhou	Jiangsu	CZX/ZSCG	187,428	3,102	4,793.8
56.	Zhoushan Putuoshan Airport	Zhoushan	Zhejiang	HSN/ZSZS	183,272	2,816	1,853.0
57.	Beijing Nanyuan Airport	Beijing	Beijing	NAY/ZBNY	179,623	2,634	0.0
58.	Yichang Sanxia Airport	Yichang	Hubei	YIH/ZHYC	173,484	3,737	992.8
59.	Dunhuang Airport	Dunhuang	Gansu	DNH/ZLDH	170,853	3,146	53.5
60.	Dehong Mangshi Airport	Mangshi	Yunnan	LUM/ZPLX	155,767	1,386	1,414.4
61.	Yibin Caiba Airport	Yibin	Sichuan	YBP/ZUYB	133,376	1,800	2,135.2
62.	Baotou Erliban Airport	Baotou	Inner Mongolia	BAV/ZBOW	132,443	2,159	744.7
63.	Kashgar Airport	Kashgar	Xinjiang	KHG/ZWSH	130,396	1,018	442.6
64.	Xuzhou Guanyin Airport	Xuzhou	Jiangsu	XUZ/ZSXZ	98,357	2,184	969.6
65.	Yiwu Airport	Yiwu	Zhejiang	YIW/ZSYW	94,756	1,350	923.2
66.	Foshan Shadi Airport	Foshan	Guangdong	FUO/ZGFS	93,850	1,203	0.0
67.	Luzhou Lantian Airport	Luzhou	Sichuan	LZO/ZULZ	91,832	1,420	1,756.4
68.	Yining Airport	Yining	Xinjiang	YIN/ZWYN	88,412	1,154	89.6
69.	Nantong Xingdong Airport	Nantong	Jiangsu	NTG/ZSNT	87,387	1,216	1,358.8
70.	Mudanjiang Hailang Airport	Mudanjiang	Heilongjiang	MDG/ZYMD	75,843	1,000	337.2
71.	Hailar Dongshan Airport	Hailar	Inner Mongolia	HLD/ZBLA	67,679	1,101	105.4
72.	Pu'er Simao Airport	Pu'er	Yunnan	SYM/ZPSM	67,679	676	354.9
73.	Liuzhou Bailian Airport	Liuzhou	Guangxi	LZH/ZGZH	63,149	1,250	224.7
74.	Diqing Shangri-La Airport	Shangri-La	Yunnan	DIG/ZPDQ	61,984	808	160.9
75.	Weihai Dashuibo Airport	Weihai	Shandong	WEH/ZSWH	60,221	1,174	529.6
76.	Baoshan Airport	Baoshan	Yunnan	BSD/ZPBS	55,241	614	238.6
77.	Xichang Qingshan Airport	Xichang	Sichuan	XIC/ZUXC	51,433	1,011	172.7
78.	Zhaotong Airport	Zhaotong	Yunnan	ZAT/ZPZT	50,402	572	193.0
79.	Meixian Airport	Meizhou	Guangdong	MXZ/ZGMX	47,502	636	21.7
80.	Lianyungang Baitabu Airport	Lianyungang	Jiangsu	LYG/ZSLG	46,904	1,348	739.7
81.	Enshi Xujiaping Airport	Enshi	Hubei	ENH/ZHES	46,677	1,656	44.6
82.	Linyi Shubuling Airport	Linyi	Shandong	LYI/ZSLY	41,431	4,290	485.4
83.	Korla Airport	Korla	Xinjiang	KRL/ZWKL	38,804	486	0.0
84.	Qamdo Bangda Airport	Qamdo	Tibet	BPX/ZUBD	38,507	572	70.4
85.	Xiangyang Liuji Airport	Xiangyang	Hubei	XFN/ZHXF	35,177	677	302.8
86.	Guilin Qifengling Airport	Guilin	Guangxi	-/-	33,924	500	0.0
87.	Dandong Langtou Airport	Dandong	Liaoning	DDG/ZYDD	33,842	445	356.1
88.	Luoyang Beijiao Airport	Luoyang	Henan	LYA/ZHLY	33,341	147,270	131.3
89.	Wuxi Shuofang Airport	Wuxi	Jiangsu	WUX/ZSWX	32,232	532	0.0
90.	Changde Taohuayuan Airport	Changde	Hunan	CGD/ZGCD	31,879	930	147.7
91.	Jingdezhen Luojia Airport	Jingdezhen	Jiangxi	JDZ/ZSJD	31,137	722	49.5
92.	Dingxin Airport	Gansu	Jiuquan	-/-	30,587	364	0.0
93.	Wanzhou Wuqiao Airport	Wanzhou	Chongqing	WXN/ZULP	30,561	474	383.4
94.	Yinchuan Helanshan Airport	Yinchuan	Ningxia	INC/ZLIC	28,033	348	0.0
95.	Jilin Ertaizi Airport	Jilin City	Jilin	JIL/ZYJL	27,719	480	133.6
96.	Qinhuangdao Shanhaiguan Airport	Qinhuangdao	Hebei	SHP/ZBSH	27,261	1,685	39.8
97.	Huizhou Airport	Huizhou	Guangdong	HUZ/ZGHZ	24,399	422	0.0
98.	Yulin Xisha Airport	Yulin	Shaanxi	UYN/ZLYL	23,447	1,174	50.2
99.	Jinzhou Xiaolingzi Airport	Jinzhou	Liaoning	JNZ/ZYJZ	23,412	430	106.8
100.	Aksu Onsu Airport	Aksu	Xinjiang	AKU/ZWAK	22,976	788	86.9
