= Yunlong =

Yunlong (云龙; 'cloud dragon') may refer to:

- Yunlong County, Dali Prefecture, Yunnan
- Yunlong District, Xuzhou, Jiangsu
- Luzhou Yunlong Airport, in Yunlong Town, Lu County, Luzhou, Sichuan

Towns

- Yunlong, Chongqing (zh), subdivision of Liangping District, Chongqing
- Yunlong, Hainan (zh), subdivision of Qiongshan District, Haikou, Hainan
- Yunlong, Jianyang, Sichuan (zh), subdivision of Jianyang, Sichuan
- Yunlong, Lu County (zh), subdivision of Lu County, Sichuan
- Yunlong, Zhejiang (zh), subdivision of Yinzhou District, Ningbo, Zhejiang

Townships

- Yunlong Township, Fujian (zh), subdivision of Minqing County, Fujian
- Yunlong Township, Yunnan (zh), subdivision of Luquan County, Yunnan
