= Shangma =

Shangma (simplified Chinese: 上马; traditional Chinese: 上馬) may refer to these places in China:

- Shangma Township, a township in Xiangyuan County, Shanxi

== Subdistricts ==
- Shangma Subdistrict, Houma, in Houma, Shanxi
- Shangma Subdistrict, Qingdao, in Chengyang District, Qingdao, Shandong

== Towns ==
- Shangma, Liaoning, in Fushun County, Liaoning
- Shangma, Sichuan, in Luzhou, Sichuan
