= Qifeng Aqueduct =

Aqueduct in Qifeng, Sichuan, China

Coordinates: 29°06′28″N 105°33′29″E

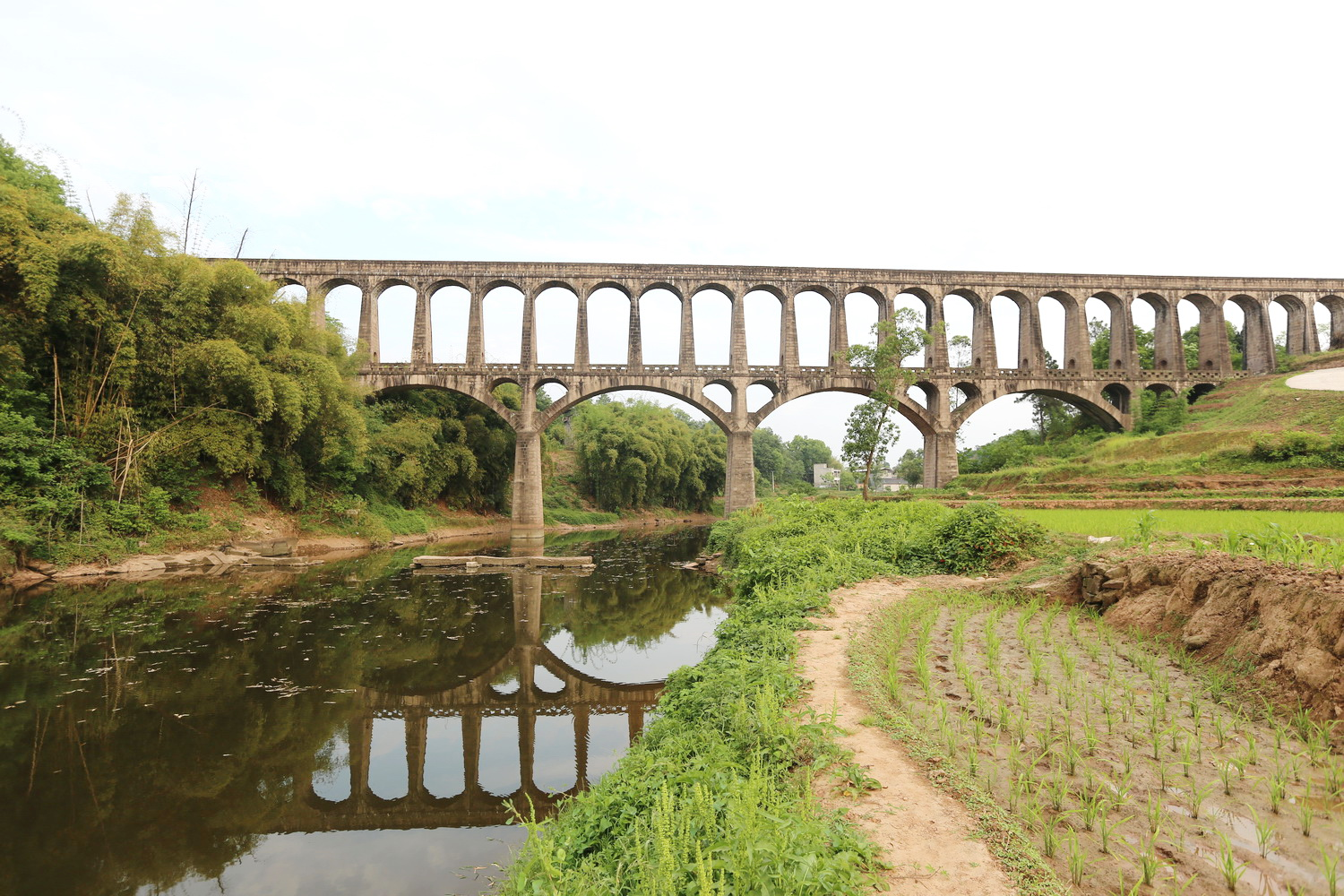
Shengli Aqueduct, a part of Qifeng Aqueduct

The Qifeng Aqueduct, which was initiated in 1975 and completed in June 1978, is situated in the territory of Qifeng Town, Lu County, Luzhou City, Sichuan Province. It has been in use since then, facilitating the self-flow irrigation of high-quality fields in Lu County and Longmatan District. Shengli Aqueduct and Huafeng Aqueduct comprise the aqueduct, which is a bridge-type aqueduct that is prevalent in Southwest China, particularly in hilly regions. It is a component of the Sanxikou Reservoir.The aqueduct was included in the Major cultural heritage sites under national-level protection in 2019.

== Construction ==
Spring and winter droughts had a significant impact on the agricultural sector in Lu County, Sichuan Province, prior to the 1970s, resulting in reduced crop yields. Sichuan Province received a feasibility report on the construction of a local aqueduct in October 1973. Two months later, the report was formally approved, and construction of the Shengli Aqueduct commenced. The construction of the Huafeng Aqueduct started in 1976. The two aqueducts were formally completed in 1978. The Qifeng Aqueduct was included in the eighth set of provincial cultural relics preservation units which was approved by the Sichuan Provincial People's Government in July 2012, and the eighth set of Major cultural heritage sites under national-level protection which was announced by the State Council of the People's Republic of China in October 2019.

== Structure ==
Shengli Aqueduct and Huafeng Aqueduct comprise the Qifeng Aqueduct, a bridge-type aqueduct that is prevalent in southwest China and in the hilly regions of the country. Shengli Aqueduct is designed as a bridge above a bridge: the lower level flows the water of Longxi River, the middle level is for pedestrians to cross the bridge, and the upper level is the water diversion channel. It is 1,000 meters long, with 21 piers and 20 spans, and the highest point is 33 meters. The part across Longxi River has 20 piers and 3 spans, and is 600 meters long. Huafeng Aqueduct is a bridge-type stone aqueduct, built with stone strips. It is 1,122 meters long, with 47 large arch spans and 76 small arch spans. There are also small arches on the piers. The highest span arch height is 39 meters, and the highest point is 43 meters.
