= Tianxian =

Tianxian may refer to these towns in Sichuan, China:

- Tianxian, Luzhou
- Tianxian, Shehong
