= LZO =

LZO may refer to:

- Lempel–Ziv–Oberhumer, a data compression algorithm
- Luzhou Yunlong Airport (IATA code), a military and civilian airport, Luzhou, China
- Luzhou Lantian Airport (former IATA code), a military airport, Luzhou, China
