= Mianyang–Luzhou high-speed railway =

Railway line in Sichuan, China

Mianyang–Luzhou high-speed railway 绵泸高铁

Overview
- Status: Operational
- Locale: Sichuan
- Termini: Mianyang; Luzhou
- Stations: 17

Service
- Type: High-speed rail
- Operator(s): China Railway High-speed

Technical
- Line length: 439 km (273 mi)
- Track gauge: 1,435 mm (4 ft 8 1/2 in) standard gauge
- Operating speed: 250 km/h (155 mph)

The Mianyang–Luzhou high-speed railway (Chinese: 绵泸高铁) is a high-speed railway in Sichuan, China. It will connect Mianyang and Luzhou. The Neijiang–Zigong–Luzhou section was opened on 28 June 2021. Construction of the Mianyang–Neijiang North section is expected to start in 2024.

== Stations ==
Railway stations: Neijiang North railway station, Neijiang East railway station, Baima North railway station, Zigong railway station, Fushun railway station, Luxian railway station, Luzhou railway station.

== History ==
A groundbreaking ceremony was held in Luzhou on 25 December 2015.
