= Shangma, Sichuan =

Shangma 上马镇
- Town
- Location in Sichuan
- Coordinates: 28°31′50″N 105°19′30″E
- Country: People's Republic of China
- Province: Sichuan
- Prefecture-level city: Luzhou
- District: Naxi District
- Time zone: UTC+8 (China Standard)

Shangma (simplified Chinese: 上马; traditional Chinese: 上馬; pinyin: Shàngmǎ) is a town in Naxi District, Luzhou, Sichuan province, China. As of 2018, it has one residential community and 10 villages under its administration.

== See also ==
- List of township-level divisions of Sichuan
