= Bosideng Bridge =

Bosideng Bridge 波司登大桥
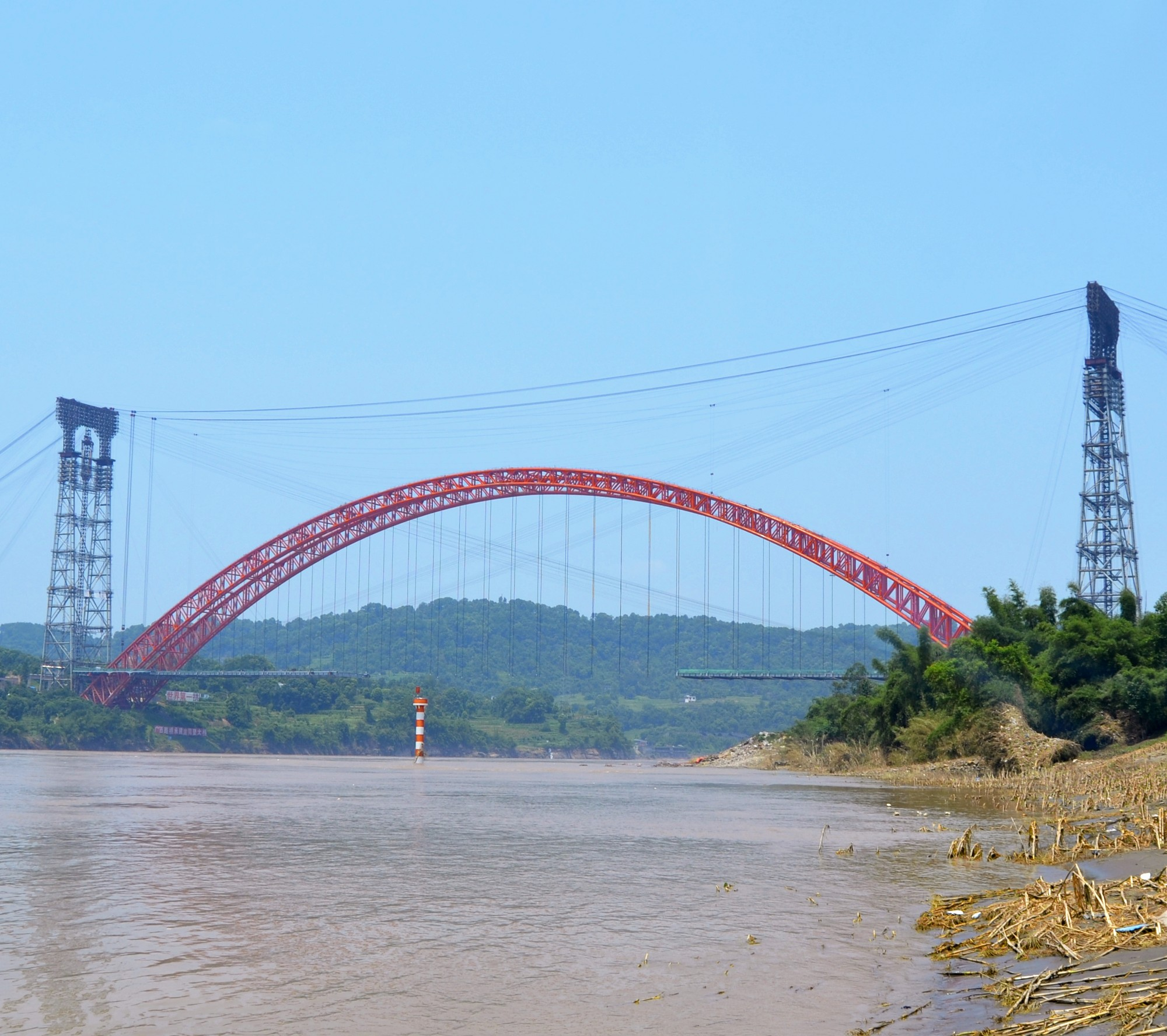
- The Bosideng Bridge Under construction.
- Coordinates: 28.892182°N 105.879717°E
- Carries: G93 Chengdu–Chongqing Ring Expressway
- Crosses: Yangtze River
- Locale: Hejiang County, Sichuan, China

Characteristics
- Design: CFST arch bridge
- Material: Steel, concrete
- Total length: 841 metres (2,759 ft)
- Longest span: 530 metres (1,740 ft)

History
- Construction end: 2012

The Bosideng Bridge (Chinese: 波司登大桥) is a highway bridge over the Yangtze River in Hejiang County, Sichuan, China. It was the third longest arch bridge in the world when opened with a span of 530 m (1,740 ft). The bridge carries traffic on the G93 Chengdu–Chongqing Ring Expressway.

The bridge can be confused with another similar bridge, the Hejiang Yangtze River Bridge located a few kilometers upstream.

== Construction ==
The Bosideng Bridge is a concrete filled steel tubular (CFST) arch bridge, at the time of construction it was the longest bridge of this design, surpassing the Wushan Yangtze Bridge.

== See also ==
- Bridges and tunnels across the Yangtze River
- List of bridges in China
- List of longest arch bridge spans
