= Hejiang Yangtze River Bridge =

Hejiang Yangtze River Bridge 合江长江公路大桥
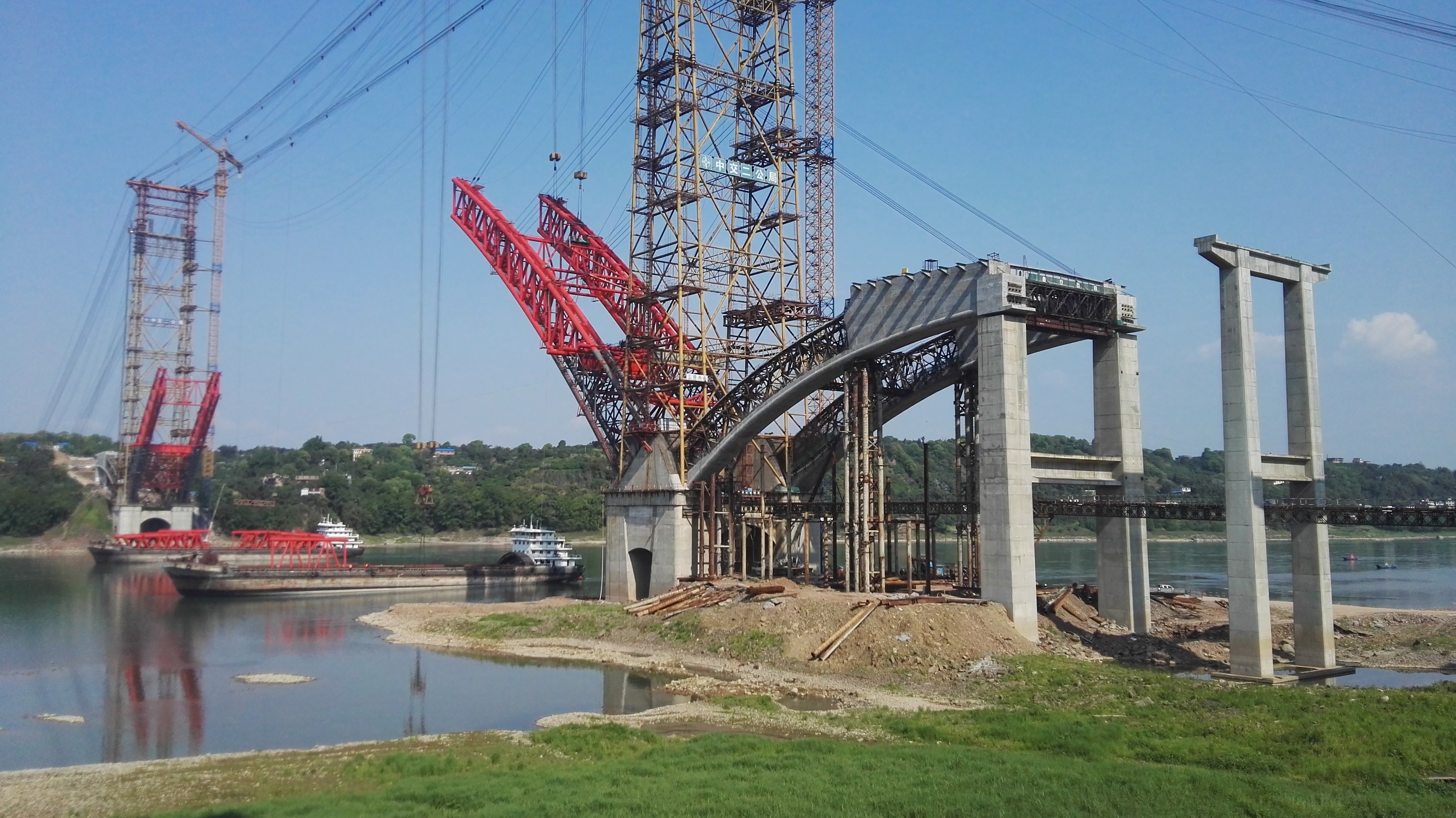
- Coordinates: 28°49′29″N 105°49′53″E
- Crosses: Yangtze River
- Locale: Hejiang County, Sichuan, China

Characteristics
- Design: Fly-bird CFST arch bridge
- Material: Steel, concrete
- Total length: 1,420 m (4,659 ft)
- Longest span: 507 m (1,663 ft)

History
- Opened: 25 June 2021

Location
- Interactive map of Hejiang Yangtze River Bridge

The Hejiang Yangtze River Bridge (Chinese: 合江长江公路大桥) crosses the Yangtze River in Hejiang County, Sichuan, China. It was one of the longest arch bridges in the world when opened with a span of 507 m (1,663 ft).

The bridge can be confused with another similar bridge, the Bosideng Bridge located a few kilometers downstream, which is sometime called the First Hejiang Yangtze River Bridge.

== See also ==
- Bridges and tunnels across the Yangtze River
- List of bridges in China
- List of longest arch bridge spans
