= Shenzi =

Shenzi may refer to:

- Shen Buhai, Chinese philosopher, or his lost work (Chinese: 申子; pinyin: Shēnzi)
- Shen Dao, Chinese philosopher, or his lost work Shenzi (Chinese: 慎子; pinyin: Shènzi)
- Shenzi (The Lion King), a hyena character from Disney's The Lion King
- Wan Shenzi (1856–1923), Chinese writer
