= Jianyang Middle School =

School in Jianyang, Sichuan, China

Sichuan Sheng Jianyang Middle School (Chinese: 四川省简阳中学; pinyin: Sìchuān shěng jiǎnyáng zhōngxué) is a school for middle-level education located in Jianyang, Sichuan. The school which was founded in the year 1899 now has two campuses, with over 10,000 students and 135 classes, on the two sides of Tuo River. It covers an area of 300 acres (1.2 km^{2}).
