= Tianxian, Luzhou =

Tianxian 天仙镇
- Town
- Location in Sichuan
- Coordinates: 28°43′36″N 105°24′38″E
- Country: People's Republic of China
- Province: Sichuan
- Prefecture-level city: Luzhou
- District: Naxi District
- Time zone: UTC+8 (China Standard)

Tianxian (Chinese: 天仙; pinyin: Tiānxiān) is a town under the administration of Naxi District, Luzhou, Sichuan, China. As of 2023, it administers Huabeixi Community (花背溪社区), Qubayi Community (渠坝驿社区), and the following thirteen villages:

- Mouguan Village (牟观村)
- Guanyin Village (观音村)
- Jiangjun Village (将军村)
- Wendeng Village (文登村)
- Ziyang Village (紫阳村)
- Huangjia Village (黄家村)
- Yinluo Village (银罗村)
- Jiutou Village (龙头村)
- Jiujun Village (九君村)
- Qingliang Village (清凉村)
- Tianxing Village (天星村)
- Shuangxin Village (双新村)
- Xuelong Village (雪龙村)
