= Luzhou Yunlong Airport =

Airport serving Luzhou, Sichuan, China

Luzhou Yunlong Airport 泸州云龙机场
- IATA: LZO; ICAO: ZULZ

Summary
- Airport type: Public / Military
- Serves: Luzhou
- Location: Yunlong, Lu County, Sichuan, China
- Opened: 10 September 2018; 8 years ago
- Coordinates: 29°01′48″N 105°28′12″E

Map
- Location of airport in Sichuan

Runways
Direction	Length		Surface
Direction	m	ft	Surface
07/25	2,700	8,858	Concrete

Statistics (2025)
- Passengers: 2,382,039
- Aircraft movements: 21,379
- Cargo (metric tons): 7,007.4

Luzhou Yunlong Airport
- Simplified Chinese: 泸州云龙机场
- Traditional Chinese: 瀘州雲龍機場
Transcriptions
Standard Mandarin
- Hanyu Pinyin: Lúzhōu Yúnlóng Jīchǎng

Luzhou Yunlong Airport (IATA: LZO, ICAO: ZULZ) is a dual-use military and civilian airport in the city of Luzhou in China's Sichuan province. Preparatory work for the airport began in October 2013 with a total investment of 2.77 billion yuan, while construction officially started on 5 November 2016. The airport was opened on 10 September 2018 with the inaugural Colorful Guizhou Airlines flight from Guiyang, and all flights were transferred from the old Luzhou Lantian Airport.

The airport is located 17 kilometres (11 mi) north of the city centre of Luzhou, at the boundary of the towns of Yunlong in Lu County, and Shidong and Shuangjia in Longmatan District.

== History ==
In 2008, the Civil Aviation Administration of China, the Sichuan Provincial Development and Reform Commission, and the Chengdu Military Region Air Force reviewed the "Relocation Report for the Luzhou Military-Civilian Airport Relocation Project." Luzhou Airport is a joint military-civilian airport. The new airport is located at the junction of Yunlong Town in Luxian County, Shidong Town in Longmatan District, and Shuangjia Town. The total investment is 2.77 billion yuan. The airport flight area is being built according to 4D standards and planned to be 4E level. The project started in October and was scheduled to be completed in 2016. The first phase of the new airport relocation project will involve the construction of a 2,600-meter-long and 45-meter-wide runway, as well as a 2,600-meter-long and 18-meter-wide parallel taxiway. In addition, a new 8,200-square-meter civil aviation terminal and an 8,000-square-meter parking lot will also be built.

In December 2009, the Luzhou Municipal People's Government officially issued the "Notice on Site Protection, Airspace and Electromagnetic Environment Protection for the Luzhou Airport Relocation Project," marking the municipal government's approval of the Luzhou Airport relocation project.

In August 2013, the feasibility report for the relocation project of Luzhou Airport passed the review of the central government, and the new airport, located in Yunlong Town, Luxian County, broke ground in October of the same year. After its completion, Yunlong Airport was planned to open 15 domestic routes by 2020, covering southern Sichuan and also serving northern Guizhou, western Chongqing, and eastern Yunnan, becoming an important trunk airport in Sichuan and even western China. It would be the third largest airport in Sichuan Province, after Chengdu Shuangliu Airport and Mianyang Nanjiao Airport.

On May 25, 2018, the airport successfully completed its calibration flight. On June 28, 2018, Luzhou Yunlong Airport successfully completed its test flight. On August 25, 2018, the civil aviation professional engineering of the airport passed the completion acceptance. On August 31, 2018, Luzhou Yunlong Airport passed the industry acceptance. On September 3, 2018, Luzhou Yunlong Airport obtained the civil airport operating license. On September 10, 2018, Luzhou Yunlong Airport officially opened to traffic.

The Yunlong Airport terminal building covers a total area of 30,000 square meters. During the initial construction phase, 8,000 square meters were reserved for international departures and arrivals, along with check-in counters, baggage carousels, and other facilities. However, because the international area is not yet operational, part of it is temporarily used for domestic flights. In 2020, Luzhou Yunlong Airport launched an international area renovation project. The main construction included upgrading the existing check-in counters and low-voltage electrical systems, adding office areas for joint inspection units such as quarantine, customs, and border inspection, and installing civil aviation security facilities.

== Facilities ==
Luzhou Yunlong is a class 4D airport, with the ability to handle Airbus A320 and Boeing 737 aircraft. It has a 10,000-square-meter (110,000 sq ft) terminal building with 8 aerobridges, and ten aircraft parking spots. It was projected to handle 2 million passengers annually by 2020.

== Airlines and destinations ==
Airlines	Destinations
Air China	Guangzhou
China Eastern Airlines	Kunming
China Southern Airlines	Guangzhou, Shenzhen, Zhuhai
China United Airlines	Beijing–Daxing
Colorful Guizhou Airlines	Ningbo
Jiangxi Air	Nanchang
Loong Air	Lijiang, Ningbo
Lucky Air	Dali, Jinan, Lijiang, Shijiazhuang, Xishuangbanna, Yinchuan, Zhengzhou
Sichuan Airlines	Hangzhou, Nanjing, Nanning, Sanya, Ürümqi, Xi'an, Xichang, Xining, Xishuangbanna
Tianjin Airlines	Huizhou
West Air	Lhasa
XiamenAir	Beijing–Daxing, Changsha, Fuzhou, Quanzhou, Shanghai–Hongqiao, Shenzhen, Wuhan, Xiamen
Xizang Airlines	Hangzhou, Lhasa

== See also ==
- List of airports in China
- List of the busiest airports in China
