= Jiangmen, Sichuan =

Jiangmen Town
- Town
- 江门镇
- Location in Sichuan Jiangmen Town (China)
- Coordinates: 28°26′36″N 105°20′47″E
- Country: China
- Province: Sichuan
- Prefecture-level city: Luzhou
- County: Xuyong County

Area
  - Total: 164.78 km^{2} (63.62 sq mi)

Population (2018)
  - Total: 35,988
  - Density: 218.40/km^{2} (565.65/sq mi)
- Time zone: UTC+8 (China Standard)
- Postal code: 646411

Jiangmen Town (simplified Chinese: 江门镇; traditional Chinese: 江門鎮; pinyin: Jiāngmén Zhèn) is a town under the administration of Xuyong County, Luzhou, Sichuan, China. As of 2018, it has one residential community and 11 villages under its administration.

== See also ==
- List of township-level divisions of Sichuan
