= Neoserica luzhouana =

Scientific classification
- Kingdom: Animalia
- Phylum: Arthropoda
- Class: Insecta
- Order: Coleoptera
- Suborder: Polyphaga
- Infraorder: Scarabaeiformia
- Family: Scarabaeidae
- Genus: Neoserica
- Species: N. luzhouana

Binomial name
- Neoserica luzhouana Ahrens, Fabrizi & Liu, 2014

Species of beetle

Neoserica luzhouana is a species of beetle of the family Scarabaeidae. It is found in China (Guizhou, Sichuan).

== Description ==
Adults reach a length of about 7.9–8 mm. They have a reddish brown, oblong body. The antennae are yellow and the dorsal surface is dull and nearly glabrous.

== Etymology ==
The species is named after its occurrence in Luzhou.
