= Hejiang County =

Hejiang County 合江县 Ho-chiang, Hokiang
- County
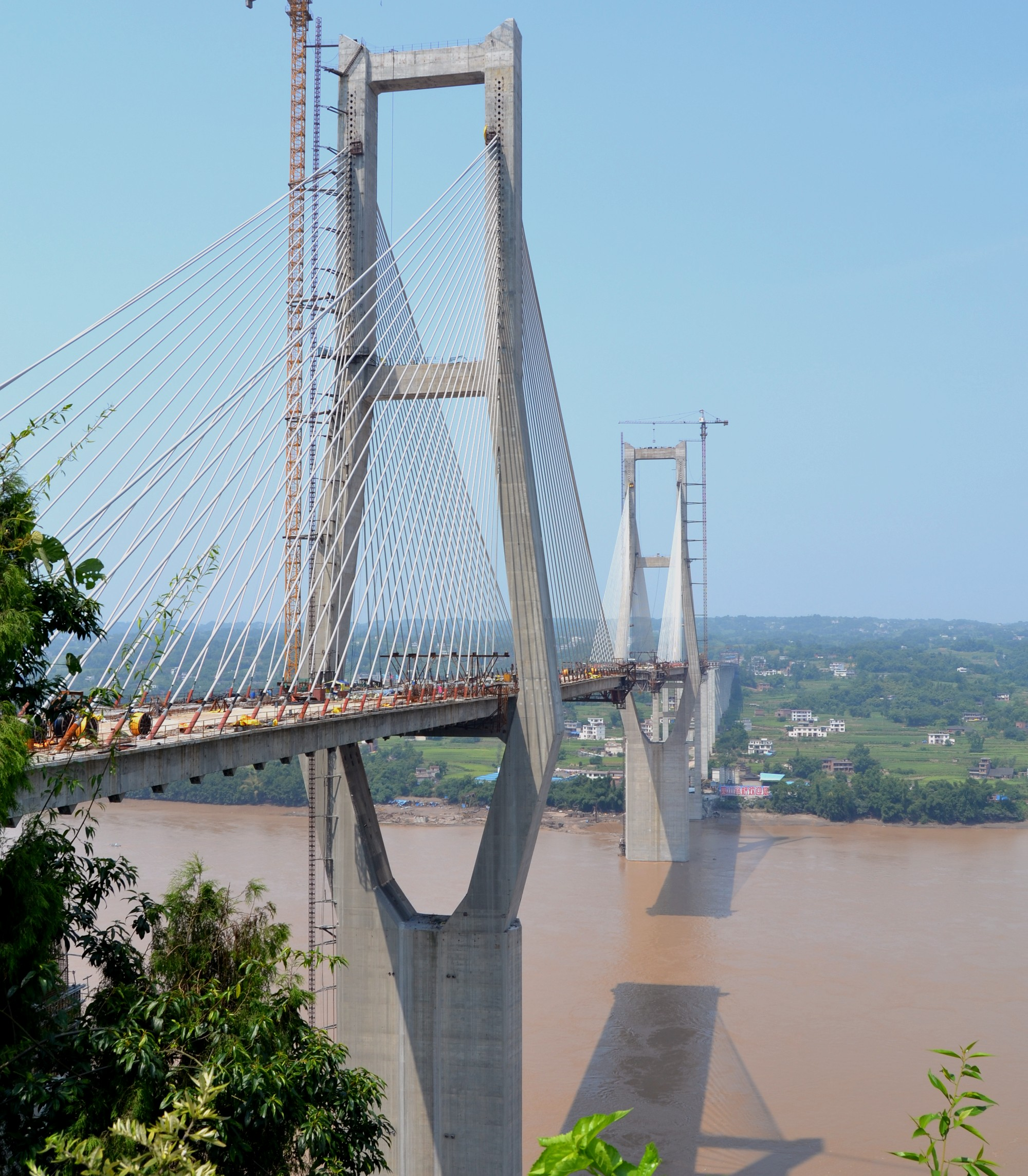

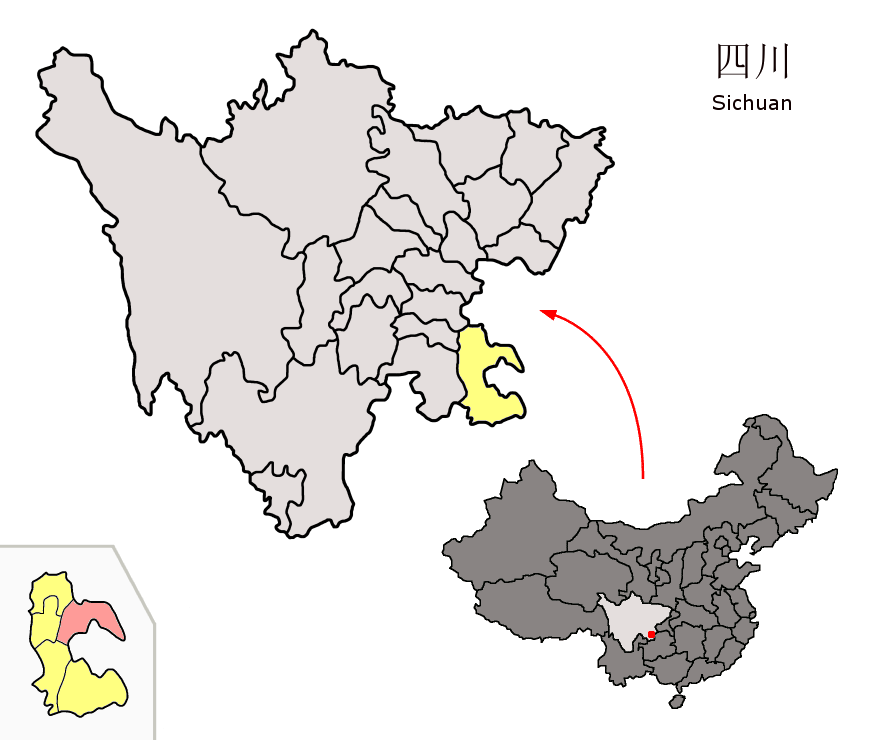
- Location of Hejiang County (red) in Luzhou City (yellow) and Sichuan province

- Location of the seat in Sichuan
- Coordinates: 28°47′N 105°54′E
- Country: China
- Province: Sichuan
- Prefecture-level city: Luzhou

Area
  - Total: 2,422 km^{2} (935 sq mi)

Population (2020 census)
  - Total: 688,731
  - Density: 284.4/km^{2} (736.5/sq mi)
- Time zone: UTC+8 (China Standard)
- Division code: HEJ

Hejiang (Chinese: 合江; pinyin: Héjiāng) is a county in the southeast of Sichuan Province, China, bordering Guizhou province to the south and Chongqing Municipality to the north and northeast. It is under the administration of Luzhou city.

== History ==
Hejiang County has a history over 2100 years. The county was built in 115 BC during the Han dynasty of China and was one of the three oldest counties in the upper Yangtze river area. Hejiang is one of the nation's counties with more than thousand years history, it was first incorporated as Fu County (符县) 115 BC, under the prefecture of Jianwei (犍为郡).

== Geography ==
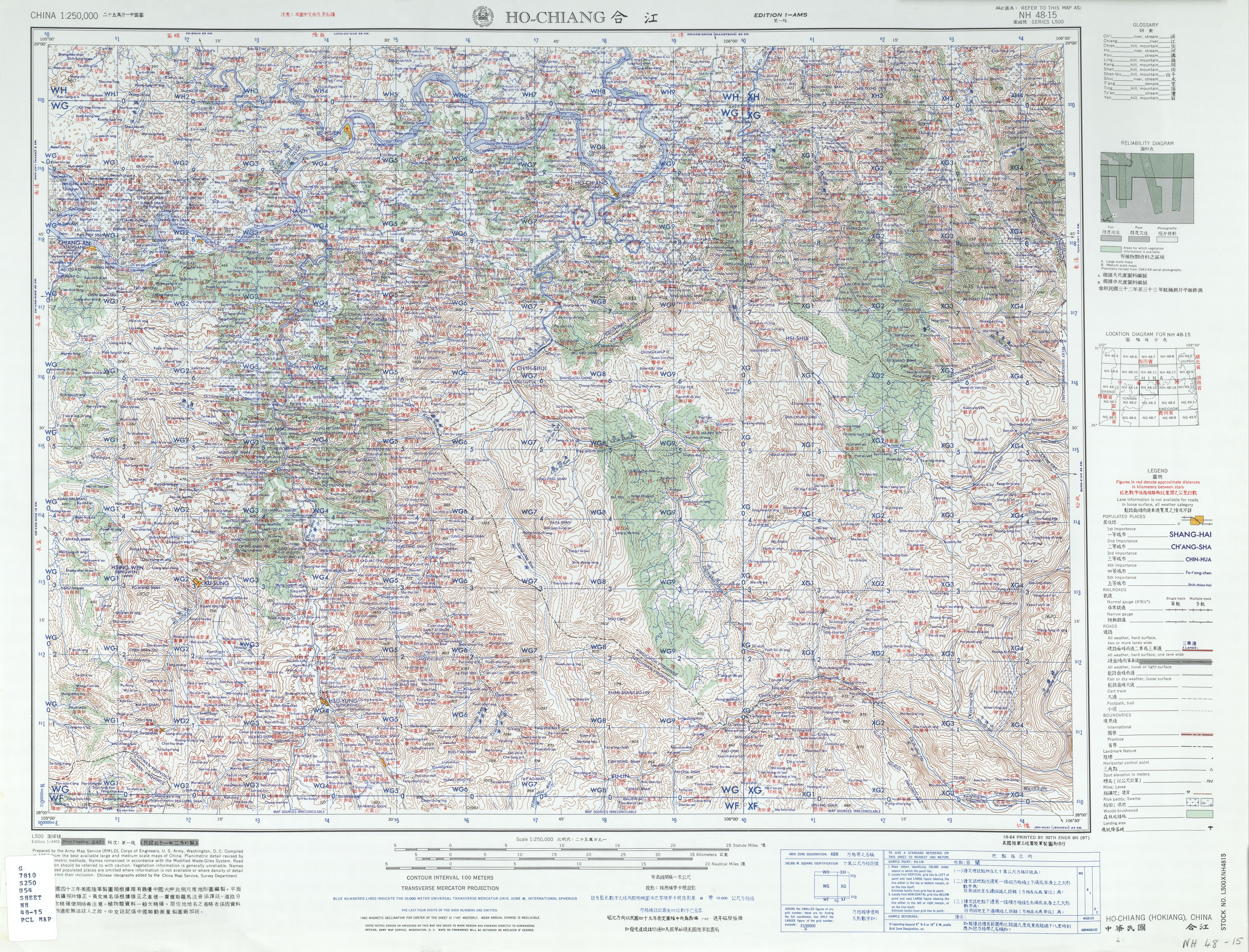
Map including Hejiang (labeled as 合江 HO-CHIANG (HOKIANG) (walled)) (AMS, 1954)

There are many historical ruin and relics, the Shengbicheng fortress which the song dynasty army withstood the Mongol attack for 34 years; Stone cave shelter in Fubao Town; Han dynasty coffin. Ancient towns, Yaoba and Fubao are listed as national history and culture towns in 2007 and 2009. Many historical background films and plays were filmed there.

Hejiang's fertile land produces rice and many other grains and plants, especially lychee. Heijiang's climate allows the harvest of lychee earlier and later than the coastal provinces of Guangdong, Guangxi, Hainan, and Fujian.

The county bordering with Chongqing Municipality and Guizhou Province, Fubao Nation Forest Park in Hejiang, Simian Mountain in Chongqing's Jiangjin, and Chishui National Scenic Spot in Guizhou, made up the tourism gold corner, highways and tourism infrastructural facilities are under construction. It will be quickly accessible from Chongqing, Luzhou or Guiyang.

The G93 national expressway connected the small city with Chongqing without one hour's journey. Plants are built along the Changjiang river. This land is changing from traditional farming to industry. Inhabitants dwell in the town Hejiang, or the county seat nearly 200,000 already. According to the city-planning of Sichuan, it will be home to more than 300,000 people.

== Administrative divisions ==
Hejiang County comprises 2 subdistricts and 19 towns:

subdistricts

- Fuyang 符阳街道
- Lingang 临港街道

towns

- Wanglong 望龙镇
- Baisha 白沙镇
- Xianshi 先市镇
- Yaoba 尧坝镇
- Jiuzhi 九支镇
- Fengming 凤鸣镇
- Rongshan 榕山镇
- Bailu 白鹿镇
- Ganyu 甘雨镇
- Fubao 福宝镇
- Xiantan 先滩镇
- Daqiao 大桥镇
- Chewang 车辋镇
- Baimi 白米镇
- Fawangsi 法王寺镇
- Shenbicheng 神臂城镇
- Shilong 石龙镇
- Zhenlong 真龙镇
- Lijiang 荔江镇

== Population ==
As of 2016, the county had a population of 900,000.

== Adjacent county-level divisions ==
- Chishui City, Guizhou – south
- Xishui County, Guizhou – south
- Longmatan District – west
- Naxi District – west
- Xuyong County – southwest
- Jiangjin District, Chongqing – northeast

== Climate ==
Climate data for Hejiang, elevation 283 m (928 ft), (1991–2020 normals, extremes 1981–present)
| Month | Jan | Feb | Mar | Apr | May | Jun | Jul | Aug | Sep | Oct | Nov | Dec | Year |
|---|---|---|---|---|---|---|---|---|---|---|---|---|---|
| Record high °C (°F) | 19.5 (67.1) | 24.8 (76.6) | 35.7 (96.3) | 35.5 (95.9) | 38.1 (100.6) | 38.5 (101.3) | 42.0 (107.6) | 43.3 (109.9) | 41.9 (107.4) | 35.2 (95.4) | 25.5 (77.9) | 19.0 (66.2) | 43.3 (109.9) |
| Mean daily maximum °C (°F) | 10.5 (50.9) | 13.7 (56.7) | 18.6 (65.5) | 24.0 (75.2) | 27.1 (80.8) | 29.1 (84.4) | 32.8 (91.0) | 33.1 (91.6) | 27.9 (82.2) | 21.5 (70.7) | 17.1 (62.8) | 11.6 (52.9) | 22.3 (72.1) |
| Daily mean °C (°F) | 7.9 (46.2) | 10.3 (50.5) | 14.3 (57.7) | 19.0 (66.2) | 22.2 (72.0) | 24.6 (76.3) | 27.6 (81.7) | 27.5 (81.5) | 23.4 (74.1) | 18.3 (64.9) | 14.1 (57.4) | 9.1 (48.4) | 18.2 (64.7) |
| Mean daily minimum °C (°F) | 6.2 (43.2) | 8.0 (46.4) | 11.4 (52.5) | 15.6 (60.1) | 18.8 (65.8) | 21.6 (70.9) | 23.9 (75.0) | 23.8 (74.8) | 20.6 (69.1) | 16.3 (61.3) | 12.1 (53.8) | 7.5 (45.5) | 15.5 (59.9) |
| Record low °C (°F) | −2.2 (28.0) | 0.2 (32.4) | 1.2 (34.2) | 7.2 (45.0) | 9.3 (48.7) | 15.3 (59.5) | 18.1 (64.6) | 18.5 (65.3) | 12.9 (55.2) | 6.5 (43.7) | 2.4 (36.3) | −1.5 (29.3) | −2.2 (28.0) |
| Average precipitation mm (inches) | 30.6 (1.20) | 26.2 (1.03) | 52.6 (2.07) | 92.5 (3.64) | 144.0 (5.67) | 181.9 (7.16) | 175.0 (6.89) | 131.2 (5.17) | 120.2 (4.73) | 98.4 (3.87) | 49.2 (1.94) | 33.1 (1.30) | 1,134.9 (44.67) |
| Average precipitation days (≥ 0.1 mm) | 14.0 | 11.2 | 14.1 | 14.5 | 16.9 | 17.9 | 13.3 | 11.6 | 14.8 | 18.5 | 13.5 | 14.0 | 174.3 |
| Average snowy days | 0.2 | 0 | 0 | 0 | 0 | 0 | 0 | 0 | 0 | 0 | 0 | 0.1 | 0.3 |
| Average relative humidity (%) | 87 | 83 | 79 | 79 | 79 | 83 | 78 | 77 | 83 | 89 | 88 | 88 | 83 |
| Mean monthly sunshine hours | 29.7 | 44.5 | 88.2 | 117.6 | 121.0 | 108.4 | 186.1 | 188.9 | 108.2 | 54.0 | 49.9 | 28.6 | 1,125.1 |
| Percentage possible sunshine | 9 | 14 | 24 | 30 | 29 | 26 | 44 | 47 | 30 | 15 | 16 | 9 | 24 |
Source: China Meteorological Administrationall-time extreme temperatureall-time July high

== See also ==
- Luzhou
