= Yunlong, Lu County =

Yunlong 云龙镇
- Town
- Location in Sichuan
- Coordinates: 29.0579°N 105.4871°E
- Country: People's Republic of China
- Province: Sichuan
- Prefecture-level city: Luzhou
- County-level city: Lu County
- Time zone: UTC+8 (China Standard)

Yunlong (Chinese: 云龙; pinyin: Yúnlóng) is a town under the administration of Lu County in Luzhou, southeast Sichuan, China. As of 2020, it administers Dakang Residential Community (达康社区) and the following 13 villages:

- Zhanqi Village (战旗村)
- Dashuihe Village (大水河村)
- Gaojiazui Village (高家嘴村)
- Maoba Village (茅坝村)
- Longhe Village (龙河村)
- Yingxiong Village (英雄村)
- Xianfeng Village (先锋村)
- Longtanzi Village (龙滩子村)
- Yunfeng Village (云丰村)
- Yanggao Village (杨高村)
- Fu'er Village (伏耳村)
- Getengwan Village (葛藤湾村)
- Zhumeitan Village (朱梅滩村)
