= Jiangyang, Luzhou =

Jiangyang 江阳区
- District
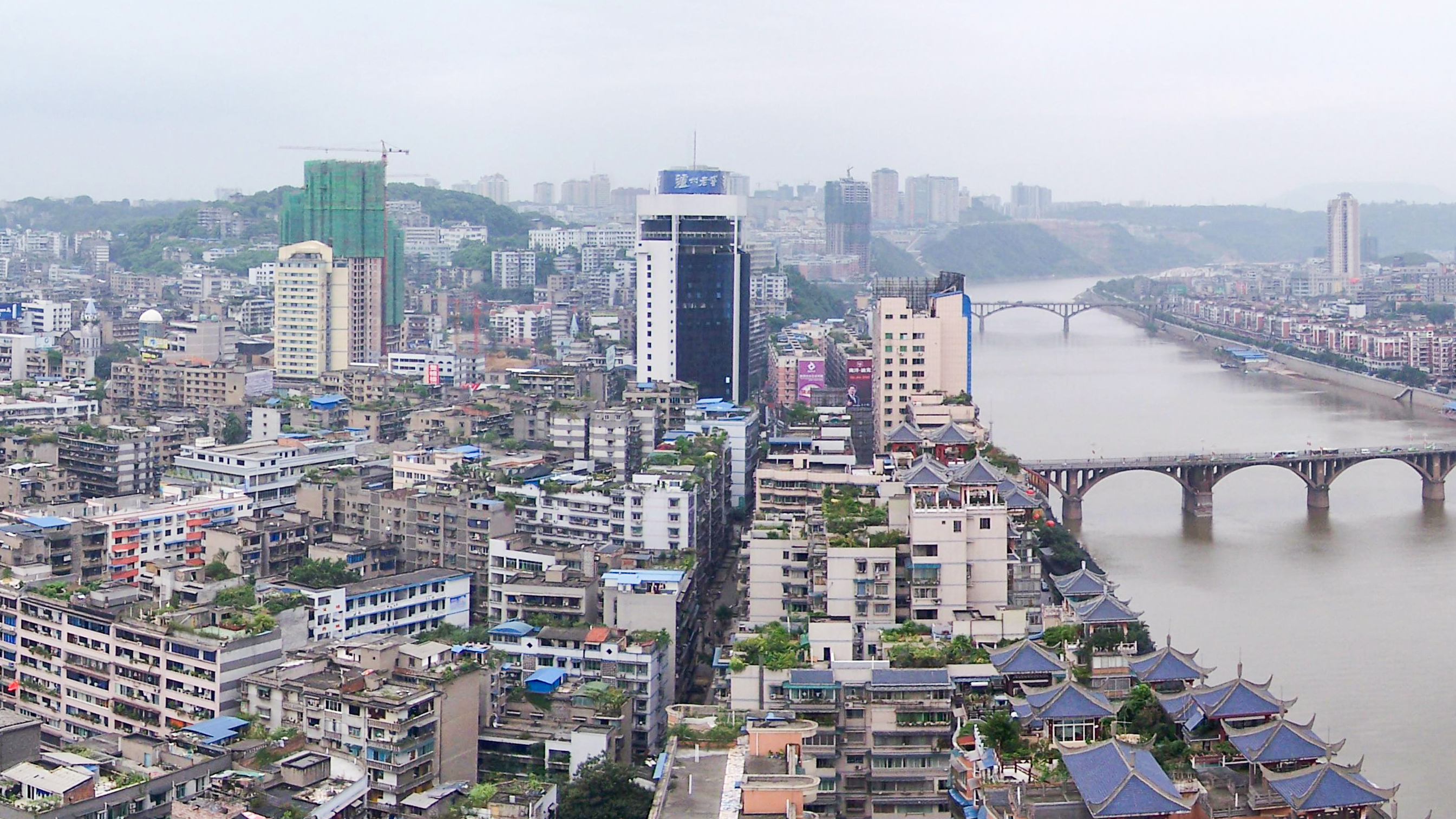
- Skyline in 2008

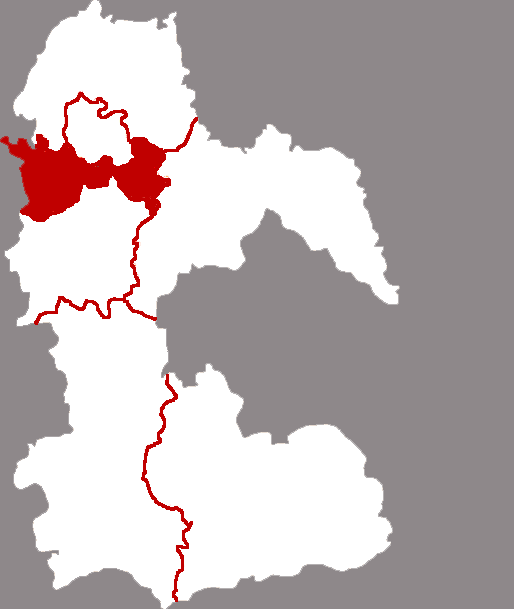
- Location of Jiangyang in Luzhou
- Country: China
- Province: Sichuan
- Prefecture-level city: Luzhou
- District seat: Dashanping Subdistrict

Area
  - Total: 649 km^{2} (251 sq mi)

Population (2020 census)
  - Total: 761,576
  - Density: 1,170/km^{2} (3,040/sq mi)
- Time zone: UTC+8 (China Standard)
- Website: www.jiangyang.gov.cn

Jiangyang District (simplified Chinese: 江阳区; traditional Chinese: 江陽區; pinyin: Jiāngyáng Qū) is the central urban district of the city of Luzhou, in the Sichuan province of China.

== History ==
The district, as the main part of the old city, has a history of 2100 years. With the expansion of the city, the district became a county-level district of the greater Luzhou city in 1996.

== Administrative divisions ==
Jiangyang District administers 9 subdistricts and 6 towns:

- Nancheng Subdistrict (南城街道)
- Beicheng Subdistrict (北城街道)
- Dashanping Subdistrict (大山坪街道)
- Linyu Subdistrict (邻玉街道)
- Lantian Subdistrict (蓝田街道)
- Qiancao Subdistrict (茜草街道)
- Huayang Subdistrict (华阳街道)
- Tai'an Subdistrict (泰安街道)
- Kuangchang Subdistrict (况场街道)
- Huangyi Town (黄舣镇)
- Tongtan Town (通滩镇)
- Jiangbei Town (江北镇)
- Fangshan Town (方山镇)
- Danlin Town (丹林镇)
- Fenshuiling Town (分水岭镇)
