= Luzhou railway station =

Railway station in Luzhou, Sichuan, China

Luzhou 泸州
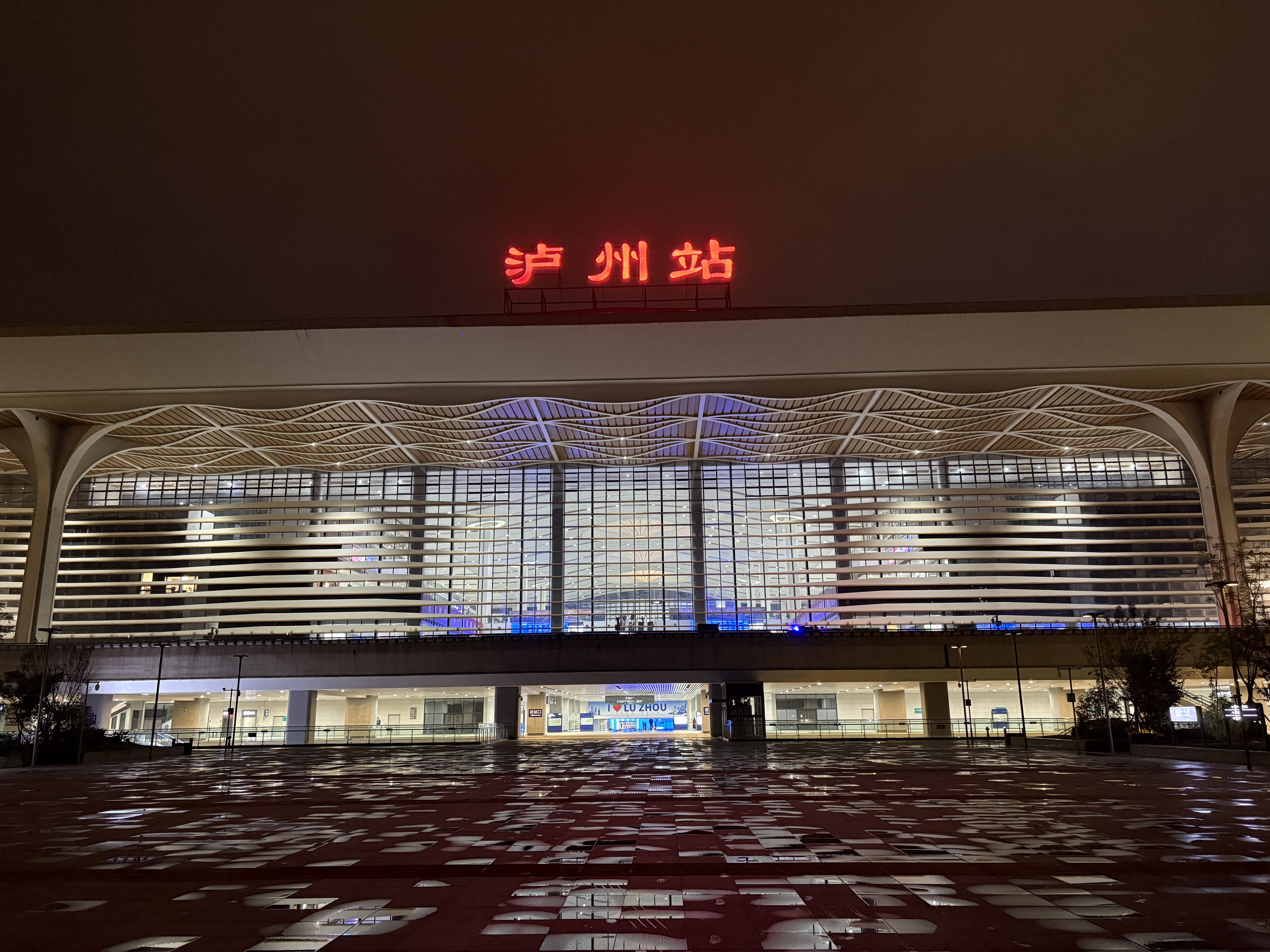
- Station building in 2025

General information
- Location: Longmatan District, Luzhou, Sichuan; China
- Coordinates: 28.9301°N 105.4183°E
- Operated by: China Railway Chengdu Group; China Railway Corporation
- Lines: Mianyang–Luzhou high-speed railway Chongqing–Kunming high-speed railway Luzhou–Zunyi high-speed railway

Other information
- Classification: 1st class station

History
- Opened: 28 June 2021
Location

Luzhou railway station (simplified Chinese: 泸州站; traditional Chinese: 瀘州站; pinyin: Lúzhōu Zhàn) is a high-speed railway station of the Mianyang–Luzhou high-speed railway. The station is located in Longmatan District, Luzhou, Sichuan province. The station opened on June 28, 2021.
