= Luzhou Lantian Airport =

Former airport of Luzhou, Sichuan, China (1945–2021)

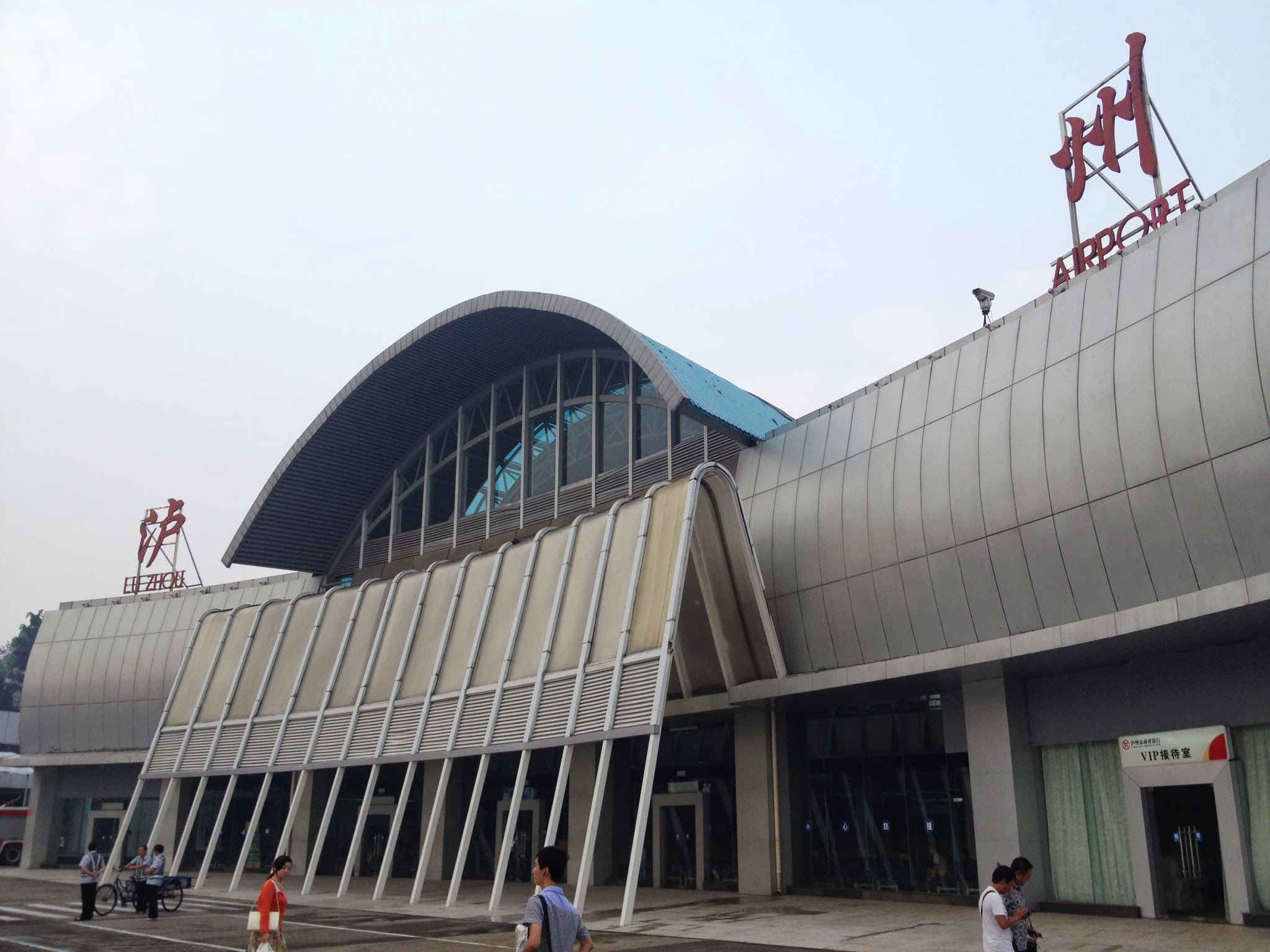
- IATA: ~~LZO~~; ICAO: ~~ZULZ~~

Summary
- Airport type: Defunct
- Serves: Luzhou, Sichuan, China
- Opened: 1945
- Closed: June 2021
- Passenger services ceased: 10 September 2018
- Coordinates: 28°51′10″N 105°23′28″E

Map
- Location of airport in Sichuan

Runways
Direction	Length		Surface
Direction	m	ft	Surface
07/25	2,400	7,874	Concrete

Statistics (2015)
- Passengers: 844,624
- Aircraft movements: 8,932
- Cargo (metric tons): 2,868.2
- Source: CAAC

Luzhou Lantian Airport
- Simplified Chinese: 泸州蓝田机场
Transcriptions
Standard Mandarin
- Hanyu Pinyin: Lúzhōu Lántián Jīchǎng

Luzhou Lantian Airport ~~(IATA: LZO, ICAO: ZULZ)~~ was a dual-use military and public airport in the city of Luzhou in Sichuan, China. It was built in 1945 and initially served an air route between China and India by the US Air Force during World War II. Services were suspended in the 1960s, but later it was used for training purposes by the People's Liberation Army Air Force. Major renovations and expansions were completed in January 2001.

Due to the limitation of the airport, the new Luzhou Yunlong Airport was constructed in the town of Yunlong in Lu County. It was opened on 10 September 2018, and all flights were transferred to the new airport.

== See also ==
- List of airports in China
- List of the busiest airports in China
