= Shangma, Liaoning =

Shangma 上马镇
- Town
- Location in Liaoning
- Coordinates: 41°46′47″N 124°8′46″E
- Country: People's Republic of China
- Province: Liaoning
- Prefecture-level city: Fushun
- County: Fushun County
- Time zone: UTC+8 (China Standard)

Shangma (simplified Chinese: 上马; traditional Chinese: 上馬; pinyin: Shàngmǎ) is a town in Fushun County, Liaoning province, China. As of 2018, it has 17 villages under its administration.

== See also ==
- List of township-level divisions of Liaoning
