= Wan Shenzi =

Chinese couplet writer

Wan Shenzi (simplified Chinese: 万慎子; traditional Chinese: 萬慎子; pinyin: Wàn Shènzǐ; 1856–1923), born in Luzhou, Sichuan, was a Chinese couplet writers in the late Qing Dynasty. He composed more than 400 couplets in his life.

His most famous couplet is located at Du Fu Thatched Cottage of Chengdu:

名望重三唐，是谁敌手？陵厉骚坛，春树暮云，竞传白也诗篇上；
遭逢同五代，故事回头，纵谈天宝，秋风茅屋，令我呜呼感慨多。
