= Shangma Township =

Shangma Township 上马乡
- Township
- Location in Shanxi
- Coordinates: 36°32′8″N 112°46′12″E
- Country: People's Republic of China
- Province: Shanxi
- Prefecture-level city: Changzhi
- County: Xiangyuan County
- Time zone: UTC+8 (China Standard)

Shangma Township (simplified Chinese: 上马乡; traditional Chinese: 上馬鄉; pinyin: Shàngmǎ Xiāng) is a township under the administration of Xiangyuan County, in southern Shanxi, China. As of 2018, it has 22 villages under its administration.
