= Xuyong County =

Xuyong County 叙永县
- County
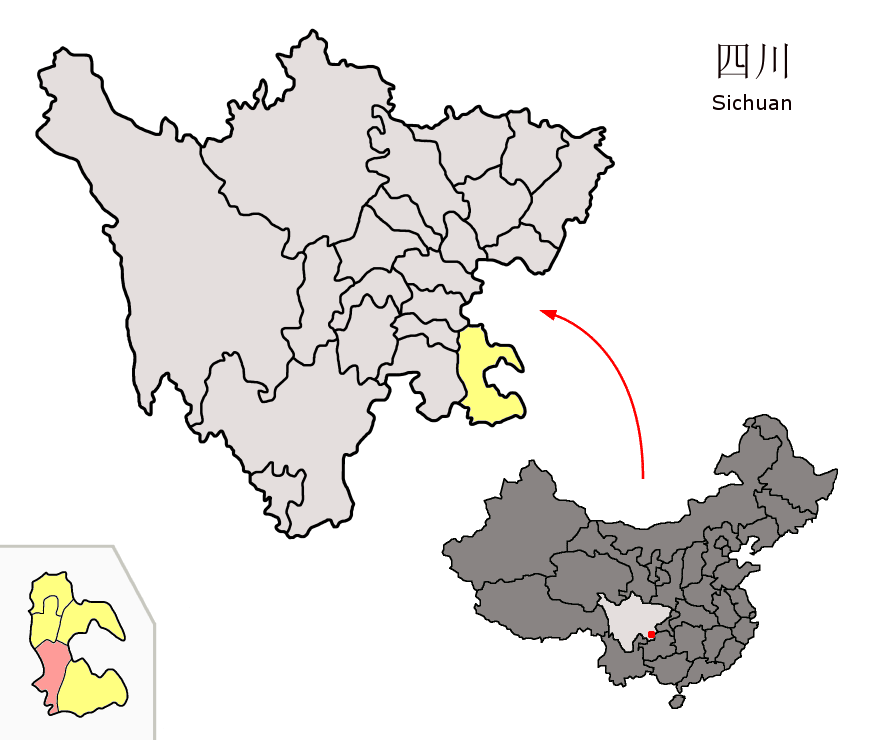
- Location of Xuyong County (red) within Luzhou City (yellow) and Sichuan
- Coordinates: 28°09′21″N 105°26′41″E
- Country: China
- Province: Sichuan
- Prefecture-level city: Luzhou
- County seat: Xuyong Town

Area
  - Total: 2,977 km^{2} (1,149 sq mi)

Population (2018)
  - Total: 582,000
  - Density: 195/km^{2} (506/sq mi)
- Time zone: UTC+8 (China Standard)

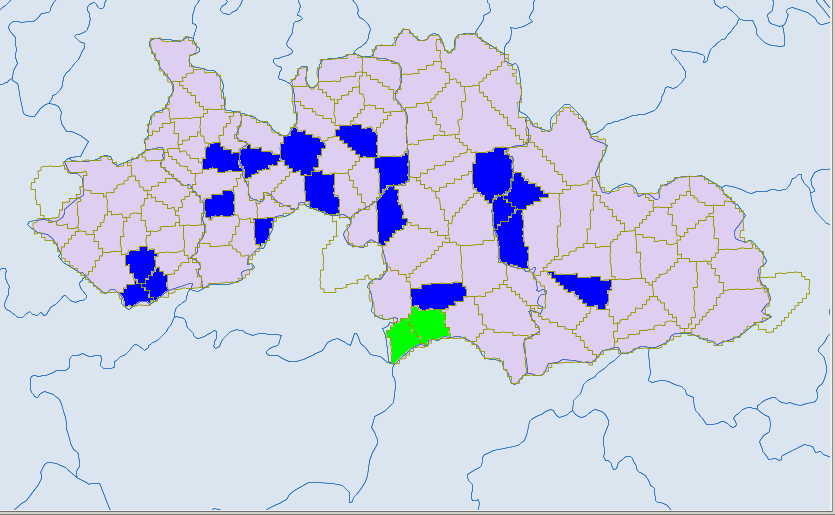
Ethnic townships in South Sichuan: Yibin and Luzhou. Light green -Yi. Blue - miao.

Xuyong County (simplified Chinese: 叙永县; traditional Chinese: 敘永縣; pinyin: Xùyǒng Xiàn) is a county in the southeast of Sichuan Province, China, bordering the provinces of Guizhou to the south and Yunnan to the west. It is under the administration of the prefecture-level city of Luzhou. The county covers 2,977 km^{2} (1,149 sq mi) with a population of 688,200 in 2007.

== Administrative divisions ==
Xuyong County comprises 18 towns and 5 ethnic townships:

towns

- Xuyong Town (叙永镇)
- Jiangmen Town (江门镇)
- Maling Town (马岭镇)
- Tianchi Town (天池镇)
- Shuiwei Town (水尾镇)
- Lianghe Town (两河镇)
- Luobu Town (落卜镇)
- Houshan Town (后山镇)
- Fenshui Town (分水镇)
- Moni Town (摩尼镇)
- Chishui Town (赤水镇)
- Longfeng Town (龙凤镇)
- Zhengdong Town (正东镇)
- Guanxing Town (观兴镇)
- Xianglin Town (向林镇)
- Macheng Town (麻城镇)
- Dashi Town (大石镇)
- Huangni Town (黄坭镇)

ethnic townships

- Hele Miao Ethnic Township (合乐苗族乡, Wuab Lob Hmongb Xangb)
- Baila Miao Ethnic Township (白腊苗族乡)
- Jiancao Miao Ethnic Township (枧槽苗族乡, Lob Hmongb Xangb Hangd Ynaf)
- Shuiliao Yi Ethnic Township (水潦彝族乡, ꎶꆂꆈꌠꑣ)
- Shixiangzi Yi Ethnic Township (石厢子彝族乡)

== Climate ==
Climate data for Xuyong, elevation 378 m (1,240 ft), (1991–2020 normals, extremes 1981–present)
Month	Jan	Feb	Mar	Apr	May	Jun	Jul	Aug	Sep	Oct	Nov	Dec	Year
Record high °C (°F)	20.9 (69.6)	27.7 (81.9)	37.0 (98.6)	36.4 (97.5)	40.3 (104.5)	40.3 (104.5)	41.0 (105.8)	43.5 (110.3)	42.9 (109.2)	34.1 (93.4)	29.5 (85.1)	21.8 (71.2)	43.5 (110.3)
Mean daily maximum °C (°F)	10.9 (51.6)	14.0 (57.2)	19.0 (66.2)	24.5 (76.1)	27.6 (81.7)	29.5 (85.1)	33.0 (91.4)	33.2 (91.8)	28.1 (82.6)	21.9 (71.4)	17.8 (64.0)	12.2 (54.0)	22.6 (72.8)
Daily mean °C (°F)	8.1 (46.6)	10.4 (50.7)	14.4 (57.9)	19.2 (66.6)	22.4 (72.3)	24.6 (76.3)	27.6 (81.7)	27.5 (81.5)	23.5 (74.3)	18.4 (65.1)	14.3 (57.7)	9.4 (48.9)	18.3 (65.0)
Mean daily minimum °C (°F)	6.3 (43.3)	8.1 (46.6)	11.4 (52.5)	15.7 (60.3)	18.8 (65.8)	21.4 (70.5)	23.8 (74.8)	23.7 (74.7)	20.6 (69.1)	16.3 (61.3)	12.1 (53.8)	7.6 (45.7)	15.5 (59.9)
Record low °C (°F)	−0.4 (31.3)	0.5 (32.9)	1.4 (34.5)	6.7 (44.1)	10.4 (50.7)	14.5 (58.1)	16.7 (62.1)	17.2 (63.0)	13.9 (57.0)	6.1 (43.0)	3.0 (37.4)	−1.5 (29.3)	−1.5 (29.3)
Average precipitation mm (inches)	38.2 (1.50)	31.1 (1.22)	55.4 (2.18)	82.6 (3.25)	131.5 (5.18)	182.0 (7.17)	157.5 (6.20)	168.4 (6.63)	108.5 (4.27)	95.0 (3.74)	48.3 (1.90)	39.1 (1.54)	1,137.6 (44.78)
Average precipitation days (≥ 0.1 mm)	16.9	13.5	15.5	14.9	16.0	18.2	14.5	13.1	14.9	19.3	14.5	15.7	187
Average snowy days	0.4	0	0	0	0	0	0	0	0	0	0	0.1	0.5
Average relative humidity (%)	83	80	77	75	75	80	76	74	80	85	84	85	80
Mean monthly sunshine hours	36.3	46.8	85.5	121.5	124.9	112.0	185.3	189.8	114.1	59.7	60.5	37.5	1,173.9
Percentage possible sunshine	11	15	23	31	30	27	44	47	31	17	19	12	26
Source: China Meteorological Administration all-time extreme temperatureAll-time Jun Record low
