= Tuo River =

River in Sichuan, China

Coordinates: 28.9036°N 105.448°E

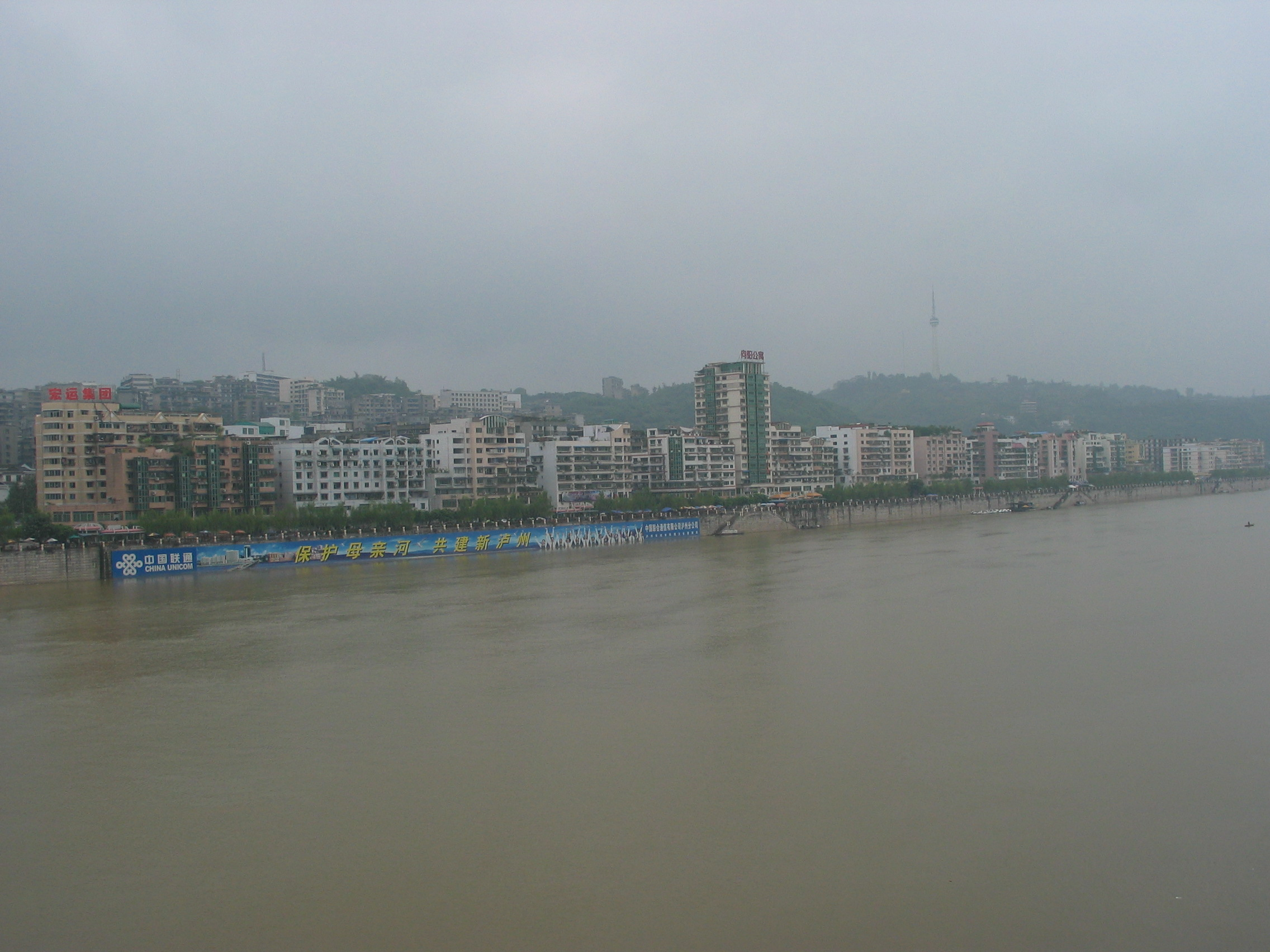
- Tuo River in Luzhou

Location
- Country: China

Physical characteristics
- Source
  - location: Ta'ershan, Sichuan
  - elevation: 2,560 m (8,400 ft)
- Mouth: Yangtze River
- Length: 655 km (407 mi)
- Basin size: 32,900 km^{2} (12,700 sq mi)
- Discharge
  - average: 1,000 m^{3}/s (35,000 cu ft/s)

The Tuo River (Chinese: 沱江; pinyin: Tuó Jiāng) is 655-kilometer (407 mi)-long river in Sichuan province of southern China.

The Tuo River is one of the major tributaries of the upper Yangtze River (Chang Jiang).

== Geography ==
The river originates at the northwest edge of Sichuan basin. It flows through Jintang, Jianyang, Ziyang, Zizhong, and Neijiang. It flows into Yangtze River in Luzhou, Sichuan.

The river has a history of pollution from phosphate mining waste, and further rapid industrialization in the 1990s caused the river to become one of the most polluted rivers in Sichuan.

In 2022, the river's water quality significantly improved, following implementation of environmental protection policies in Sichuan province.

== See also ==
- Index: Tributaries of the Yangtze River
- List of rivers in China
- Great Soviet Encyclopedia
