= Tianxian, Shehong =

Tianxian 天仙镇
- Town
- Location in Sichuan
- Coordinates: 31°1′0″N 105°26′6″E
- Country: People's Republic of China
- Province: Sichuan
- Prefecture-level city: Suining
- County-level city: Shehong
- Time zone: UTC+8 (China Standard)

Tianxian (Chinese: 天仙; pinyin: Tiānxiān) is a town under the administration of Shehong, Sichuan, China. As of 2023, it administers Tianxiansi Community (天仙寺社区), Taixing Community (太兴社区), and the following seventeen villages:

- Tianhe Village (天和村)
- Sile Village (四乐村)
- Longfeng Village (龙丰村)
- Baima Village (白马村)
- Feiyue Village (飞跃村)
- Tianfu Village (天福村)
- Shuangmiao Village (双庙村)
- Dashi Village (大石村)
- Fengming Village (凤鸣村)
- Yuzhenguan Village (玉贞观村)
- Shuangqing Village (双青村)
- Qinglongzhui Village (青龙嘴村)
- Taiping Village (太平村)
- Wenchang Village (文昌村)
- Sanqing Village (三清村)
- Shengxue Village (圣学村)
- Erjiaosi Village (二教寺村)
