= Longmatan, Luzhou =

Longmatan 龙马潭区
- District
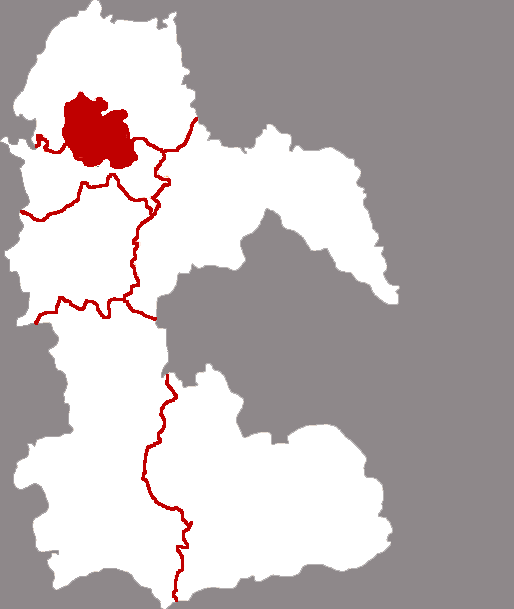
- Location of Longmatan in Luzhou

- Location in Sichuan
- Coordinates: 28°54′46″N 105°26′23″E
- Country: China
- Province: Sichuan
- Prefecture-level city: Luzhou

Area
  - Total: 340.8 km^{2} (131.6 sq mi)

Population (2020)
  - Total: 479,697
  - Density: 1,408/km^{2} (3,646/sq mi)
- Time zone: UTC+8 (China Standard)

Longmatan District (simplified Chinese: 龙马潭区; traditional Chinese: 龍馬潭區; pinyin: Lóngmǎtán Qū) is a district of the city of Luzhou, Sichuan Province, China. The district covers 340.8 km^{2} (131.6 sq mi) with a population of 336,000 as of 2007.

== Administrative divisions ==
Longmatan District comprises 8 subdistricts and 3 towns:

subdistricts

- Xiaoshi 小市街道
- Hongxing 红星街道
- Lianhuachi 莲花池街道
- Luohan 罗汉街道
- Yutang 鱼塘街道
- Anning 安宁街道
- Shidong 石洞街道
- Texing 特兴街道

towns

- Hushi 胡市镇
- Shuangjia 双加镇
- Jinlong 金龙镇

== Transport ==
- Luzhou railway station is located in Longmatan District.
