= Naxi, Luzhou =

District of Luzhou, Sichuan Province, China

Coordinates: 28°46′24″N 105°22′17″E

Naxi 纳溪区
- District
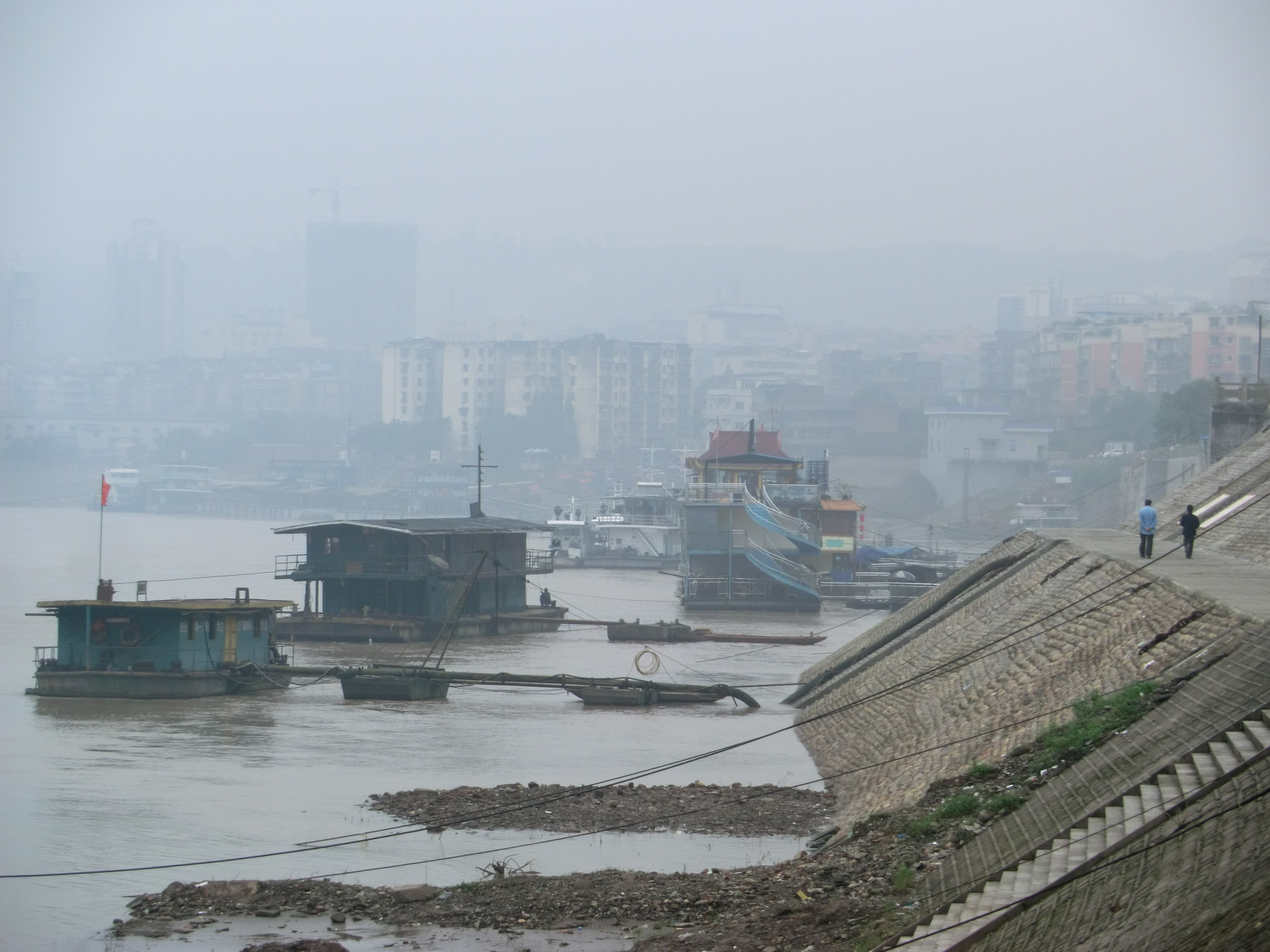

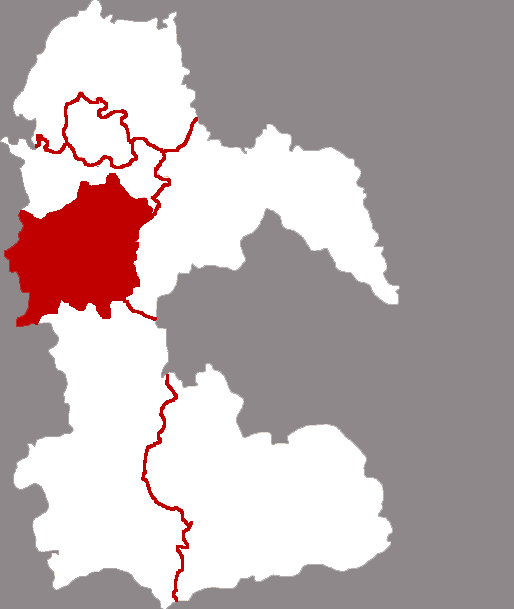
- Naxi District in Luzhou

- Luzhou in Sichuan
- Country: China
- Province: Sichuan
- Prefecture-level city: Luzhou

Area
  - Total: 1,150.6 km^{2} (444.2 sq mi)

Population (2018)
  - Total: 469,000
  - Density: 408/km^{2} (1,060/sq mi)
- Time zone: UTC+8 (China Standard)

Naxi District (simplified Chinese: 纳溪区; traditional Chinese: 納溪區; pinyin: Nàxī Qū) is a county-level district of the city of Luzhou, Sichuan Province, China. Formerly a county of Luzhou, Naxi became a district of Luzhou in 1996.

== History ==
Naxi, as a county, had a history of 764 years before it became a district of Luzhou in 1996.

== Administrative divisions ==
Naxi District comprises 3 subdistricts and 10 towns:

subdistricts

- Anfu 安富街道
- Yongning 永宁街道
- Dongsheng 东升街道

towns

- Dadukou 大渡口镇
- Huguo 护国镇
- Dagu 打古镇
- Shangma 上马镇
- Hemian 合面镇
- Fengle 丰乐镇
- Baijie 白节镇
- Tianxian 天仙镇
- Xinle 新乐镇
- Longche 龙车镇

== Geography ==
The district has a total area of 1,151 km^{2} (444 sq mi).

== Climate ==
Climate data for Naxi, elevation 369 m (1,211 ft), (1991–2020 normals)
Month	Jan	Feb	Mar	Apr	May	Jun	Jul	Aug	Sep	Oct	Nov	Dec	Year
Mean daily maximum °C (°F)	9.9 (49.8)	13.0 (55.4)	18.0 (64.4)	23.5 (74.3)	26.7 (80.1)	28.5 (83.3)	31.9 (89.4)	32.1 (89.8)	27.0 (80.6)	21.0 (69.8)	16.7 (62.1)	11.1 (52.0)	21.6 (70.9)
Daily mean °C (°F)	7.5 (45.5)	9.9 (49.8)	14.0 (57.2)	18.8 (65.8)	22.0 (71.6)	24.2 (75.6)	27.0 (80.6)	27.0 (80.6)	22.9 (73.2)	18.0 (64.4)	13.8 (56.8)	8.8 (47.8)	17.8 (64.1)
Mean daily minimum °C (°F)	5.7 (42.3)	7.7 (45.9)	11.1 (52.0)	15.3 (59.5)	18.5 (65.3)	21.2 (70.2)	23.5 (74.3)	23.3 (73.9)	20.2 (68.4)	16.0 (60.8)	11.7 (53.1)	7.2 (45.0)	15.1 (59.2)
Average precipitation mm (inches)	32.2 (1.27)	26.8 (1.06)	50.1 (1.97)	85.2 (3.35)	122.1 (4.81)	193.0 (7.60)	166.2 (6.54)	156.9 (6.18)	132.9 (5.23)	93.5 (3.68)	45.8 (1.80)	32.2 (1.27)	1,136.9 (44.76)
Average precipitation days (≥ 0.1 mm)	13.5	11.2	12.9	14.0	15.8	17.5	13.4	11.9	14.9	18.2	13.2	13.4	169.9
Average snowy days	0.3	0.1	0	0	0	0	0	0	0	0	0	0.2	0.6
Average relative humidity (%)	87	83	79	78	79	85	81	79	84	89	87	88	83
Mean monthly sunshine hours	32.3	52.7	94.4	123.7	127.3	110.5	184.6	186.1	103.4	52.3	50.6	29.6	1,147.5
Percentage possible sunshine	10	17	25	32	30	26	43	46	28	15	16	9	25
Source: China Meteorological Administration

== Population ==
As of 2008, Naxi District had a population of over 477,000.
