= Lu County =

Lu County 泸县
- County
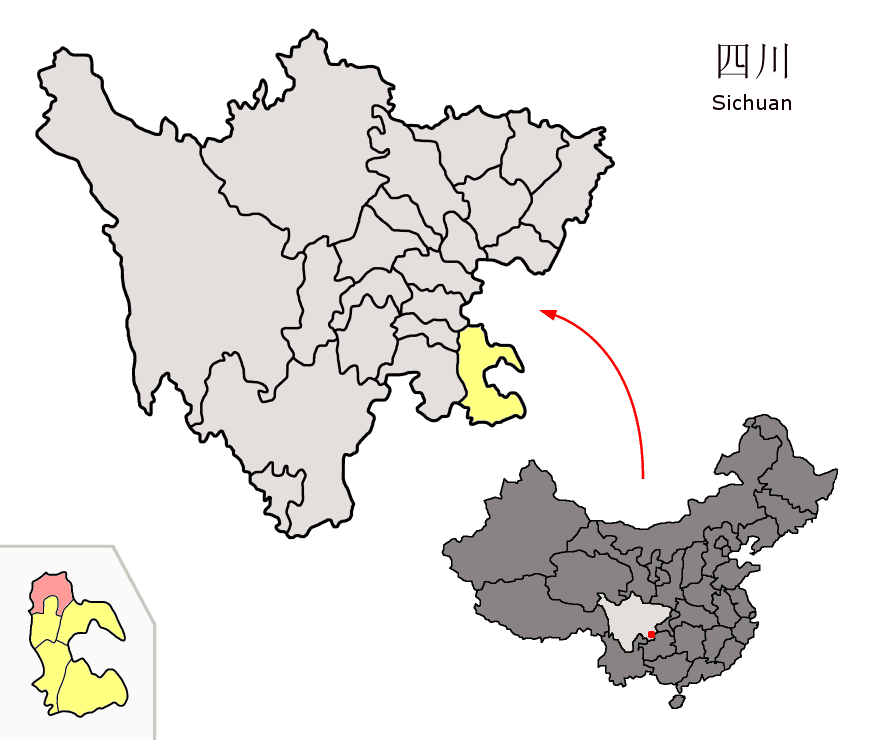
- Location of Lu County (red) within Luzhou City (yellow) and Sichuan
- Coordinates: 29°09′05″N 105°22′55″E
- Country: China
- Province: Sichuan
- Prefecture-level city: Luzhou

Area
  - Total: 1,532 km^{2} (592 sq mi)

Population (2018)
  - Total: 872,000
  - Density: 569/km^{2} (1,470/sq mi)
- Time zone: UTC+8 (China Standard)

Lu County or Luxian (simplified Chinese: 泸县; traditional Chinese: 瀘縣; pinyin: Lú Xiàn) is a county in the southeast of Sichuan Province, China, bordering Chongqing Municipality to the northeast. It is the northernmost county-level division of Luzhou city.

== History ==
Lu County has a history over 2100 years. The county, known anciently as Jiangyang (江阳; 江陽), was established in 135 BC during the Han Dynasty.

== Administrative divisions ==
Lu County comprises 1 subdistrict and 19 towns:

subdistrict

- Yuchan 玉蟾街道

towns

- Fuji 福集镇
- Jiaming 嘉明镇
- Yusi 喻寺镇
- Desheng 得胜镇
- Niutan 牛滩镇
- Zhaoya 兆雅镇
- Xuantan 玄滩镇
- Taifu 太伏镇
- Yunlong 云龙镇
- Shiqiao 石桥镇
- Pilu 毗卢镇
- Qifeng 奇峰镇
- Chaohe 潮河镇
- Yunjin 云锦镇
- Lishi 立石镇
- Baihe 百和镇
- Tianxing 天兴镇
- Fangdong 方洞镇
- Haichao 海潮镇

== Geography ==
Lu County is 105°10′50″ – 105°45′30″E,28°54′40″ – 29°20′00″N. This results in an east–west span of 56.23 km (34.94 mi) and north–south length of 46.8 km (29.1 mi). The county has a total area of 1,532 km^{2} (592 sq mi).

== Population ==
As of 2006 the county had a population of 1,055,200.

== Transport ==
- China National Highway 321

== Climate ==
Climate data for Luxian, elevation 322 m (1,056 ft), (1991–2020 normals, extremes 1981–present)
Month	Jan	Feb	Mar	Apr	May	Jun	Jul	Aug	Sep	Oct	Nov	Dec	Year
Record high °C (°F)	18.1 (64.6)	24.2 (75.6)	32.8 (91.0)	33.9 (93.0)	36.2 (97.2)	36.6 (97.9)	40.5 (104.9)	41.9 (107.4)	40.5 (104.9)	33.5 (92.3)	25.7 (78.3)	19.6 (67.3)	41.9 (107.4)
Mean daily maximum °C (°F)	10.4 (50.7)	13.8 (56.8)	19.1 (66.4)	24.2 (75.6)	27.3 (81.1)	29.0 (84.2)	32.6 (90.7)	32.7 (90.9)	27.5 (81.5)	21.7 (71.1)	17.1 (62.8)	11.6 (52.9)	22.3 (72.1)
Daily mean °C (°F)	7.6 (45.7)	10.2 (50.4)	14.6 (58.3)	19.3 (66.7)	22.6 (72.7)	24.8 (76.6)	27.7 (81.9)	27.5 (81.5)	23.5 (74.3)	18.5 (65.3)	14.0 (57.2)	8.9 (48.0)	18.3 (64.9)
Mean daily minimum °C (°F)	5.7 (42.3)	7.7 (45.9)	11.5 (52.7)	15.8 (60.4)	19.1 (66.4)	21.9 (71.4)	24.2 (75.6)	24.0 (75.2)	20.9 (69.6)	16.5 (61.7)	12.0 (53.6)	7.2 (45.0)	15.5 (60.0)
Record low °C (°F)	−1.6 (29.1)	0.1 (32.2)	1.8 (35.2)	7.1 (44.8)	11.2 (52.2)	15.5 (59.9)	18.8 (65.8)	18.5 (65.3)	14.6 (58.3)	7.9 (46.2)	2.8 (37.0)	−1.3 (29.7)	−1.6 (29.1)
Average precipitation mm (inches)	21.7 (0.85)	16.5 (0.65)	42.1 (1.66)	78.9 (3.11)	116.2 (4.57)	178.4 (7.02)	181.1 (7.13)	163.0 (6.42)	133.9 (5.27)	79.8 (3.14)	37.4 (1.47)	19.7 (0.78)	1,068.7 (42.07)
Average precipitation days (≥ 0.1 mm)	11.2	8.4	11.5	14.0	14.9	17.5	12.4	12.0	14.8	17.6	11.7	10.9	156.9
Average snowy days	0.2	0	0	0	0	0	0	0	0	0	0	0	0.2
Average relative humidity (%)	86	81	77	76	75	82	79	77	83	87	86	86	81
Mean monthly sunshine hours	33.3	54.5	102.8	128.0	126.3	103.4	181.5	178.5	97.2	54.1	48.6	32.0	1,140.2
Percentage possible sunshine	10	17	27	33	30	25	43	44	27	15	15	10	25
Source: China Meteorological Administrationall-time extreme temperatureall-time July high

== See also ==
- Luzhou
