= Luzhou =

Luzhou 泸州市
- Prefecture-level city
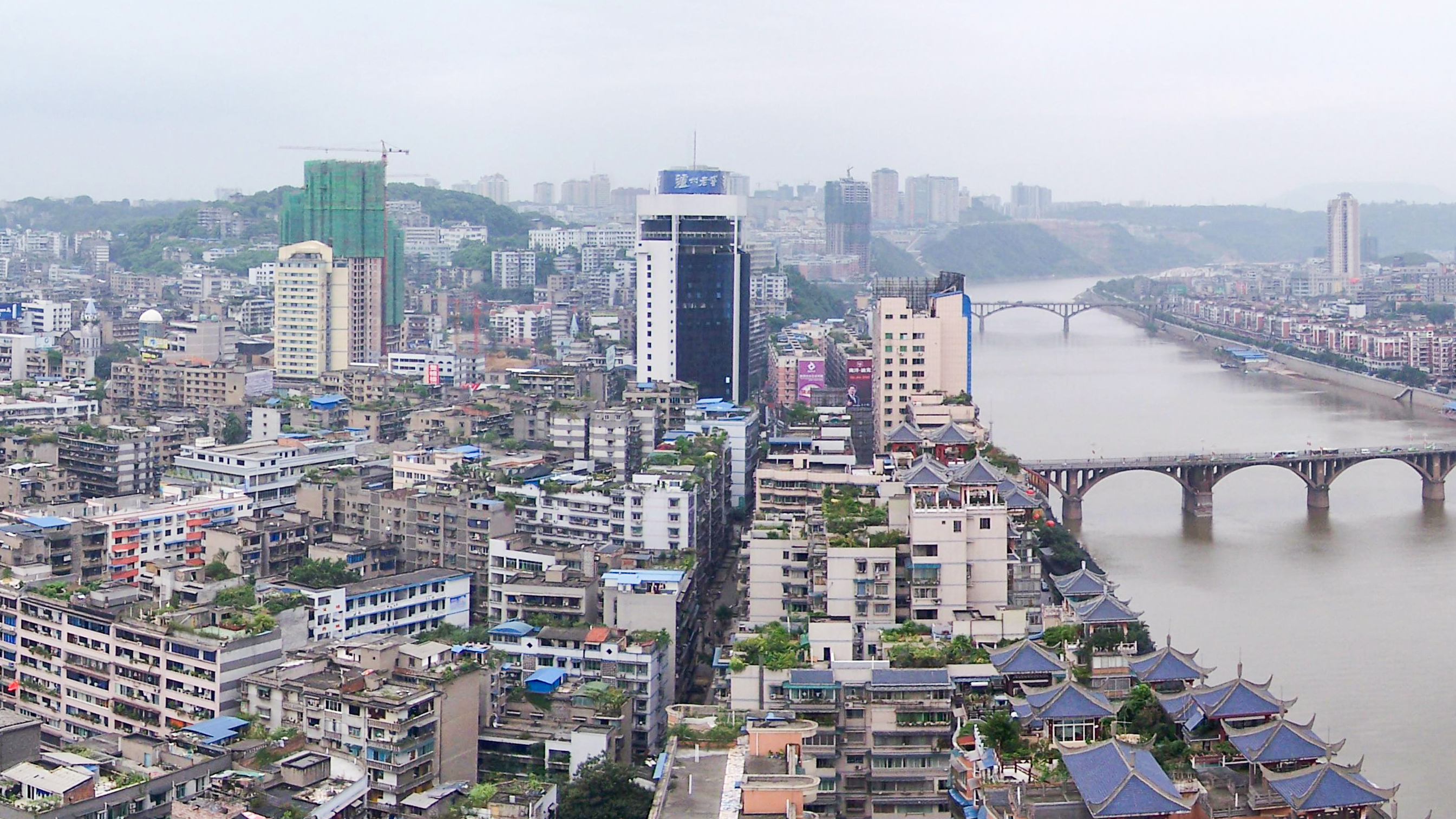
- Luzhou in 2008

- Location of Luzhou City jurisdiction in Sichuan

- Location in China
- Coordinates (Luzhou municipal government): 28°52′16″N 105°26′31″E
- Country: People's Republic of China
- Province: Sichuan
- County-level divisions: 7
- Established: 151 BC
- Municipal seat: Jiangyang District

Government
  - Type: Prefecture-level city
  - CPC Luzhou Secretary: Jiang Fuyi (蒋辅义)
  - Mayor: Liu Qiang (刘强)

Area
  - Prefecture-level city: 12,233.58 km^{2} (4,723.41 sq mi)
  - Metro: 981.7 km^{2} (379.0 sq mi)
- Elevation: 262 m (860 ft)

Population (2020 census)
  - Prefecture-level city: 4,254,149
  - Density: 347.7436/km^{2} (900.6518/sq mi)
  - Urban: 1,596,119
  - Metro: 1,241,273
  - Metro density: 1,264/km^{2} (3,275/sq mi)
- Demonym: Luzhouese

Major ethnic groups
  - Han: 98.47%
  - Hmong: 1.26%
  - other ethnic groups: 0.27%

GDP
  - Prefecture-level city: CN¥ 272.5 billion US$ 38.4 billion
  - Per capita: CN¥ 65,662; US$ 9,291
- Time zone: UTC+8 (China Standard)
- Postal code: 646000
- Area code: 830
- ISO 3166 code: CN-SC-05
- City flower: Osmanthus fragrans
- City tree: Longan tree
- Regional dialect: Chuan: Luzhou dialect (泸州话)
- License plate prefix: 川E
- Website: luzhou.gov.cn

Luzhou (Chinese: 泸州; pinyin: Lúzhōu; Sichuanese Pinyin: Nu^{2}zou^{1}; Luzhou dialect: [nu˨˩tsəu˥]) is a prefecture-level city located in the southeast of Sichuan Province, China. It is also known as the "Liquor City" (酒城). It was named Jiangyang (simplified Chinese: 江阳; traditional Chinese: 江陽; pinyin: Jiāngyáng) until the Northern and Southern dynasties. Situated at the confluence of the Tuo River and the Yangtze River, Luzhou has been Sichuan province's largest port in both size and output since Chongqing's separation from Sichuan in 1997. As of the 2020 Chinese census, its population was 4,254,149. Of these, 1,241,273 lived in the built-up (or metro) area made of Jiangyang and Longmatan districts, as Naxi district is not conurbated yet. Luzhou borders Yunnan, Guizhou provinces and the Chongqing municipality. As the only geographic junction of the four provinces, it was an important port location in ancient China. After the PRC was founded in 1949, Luzhou became the capital of southern Sichuan province. In 1983, Luzhou was upgraded to prefecture-level city status.

Luzhou is best known for its alcoholic beverages, particularly baijiu.

== History ==
Luzhou was incorporated into the Ba state early in the Shang and Zhou period, in the 11th century BC. In 316 BC, during the Warring States period, King Huiwen of Qin established Ba prefecture, which included most of Luzhou, after he conquered the states of Ba and Shu. The local economy and culture expanded as a result of the advanced production technique and culture introduced by immigrants from the rest of China. During the Western Han dynasty (206 BC-AD 9), Jiangyang county was set up in what is the current Jiangyang district, at the confluence of the Tuo River and Yangtze River. The county was further expanded during the reign of Emperor Wu of Han. As a result, Luzhou became the portal of the Tuojing River leading to western Sichuan, which brought great prosperity to salt-refinery and agriculture in the area.

The Song dynasty was an important period in Luzhou's history. It was known as the natural granary of southern Sichuan as the liquor-distilling and salt-refining industries expanded. The method to decoct salt with natural gas was discovered at that time, according to ancient literature. In addition, trade and business between Luzhou residents and ethnic groups was brisk and a protective wall as well as forts were constructed by the local government.

In the Yuan dynasty, Luzhou remained an important place for trade, especially the liquor-distillation, salt-refinery and tea-making industries. A large number of wooden ships were constructed to further the shipping industry.

During the Qing dynasty (1644–1911), waves of immigrants from other parts of China brought rapid growth in economy and culture. Luzhou served as a political, economic, military and cultural center for the provinces of Sichuan, Guizhou and Yunnan.

On December 6, 1949, two months after the founding of the People's Republic of China, the People's Liberation Army took control of Luzhou from the Kuomintang government. Before its abolition on August 7, 1952, the Chuannan Administrative District governed one prefecture-level city, four prefectures, totaling five prefecture-level administrative divisions, as well as five urban districts, four county-level cities, and 33 counties, amounting to 42 county-level administrative divisions. Luzhou was the seat of both the Administrative Inspector's Office of Luzhou and Luxian District (at the prefecture level), as well as the Commissioner's Office of the Luzhou Prefecture (also at the prefecture level). It also served as the location of the Chuannan Administrative Office and was under both the jurisdiction of the Chuannan Administrative Region and the prefecture-level administration. In 1960, Luzhou prefecture was created with five counties that had been part of Yibin prefecture. During the Cultural Revolution (1966–1976), Luzhou experienced a series of armed factional conflicts that lasted nearly four years (1967–1970). In just three major battles, more than 2,000 people were killed and over 16,000 injured—over 8,000 of them left permanently disabled. Additionally, more than 300 million yuan of state funds were misappropriated, over 68.4 million jin (approximately 34,200 tons) of grain were consumed or lost, more than 1,000 vehicles were destroyed, and a large quantity of materials was damaged or looted.

The prefecture was upgraded to the prefecture-level city of Luzhou in 1983. Nowadays, Luzhou is considered a center of the chemical, machinery, and liquor-distilling industries.

== Historic and cultural relics ==
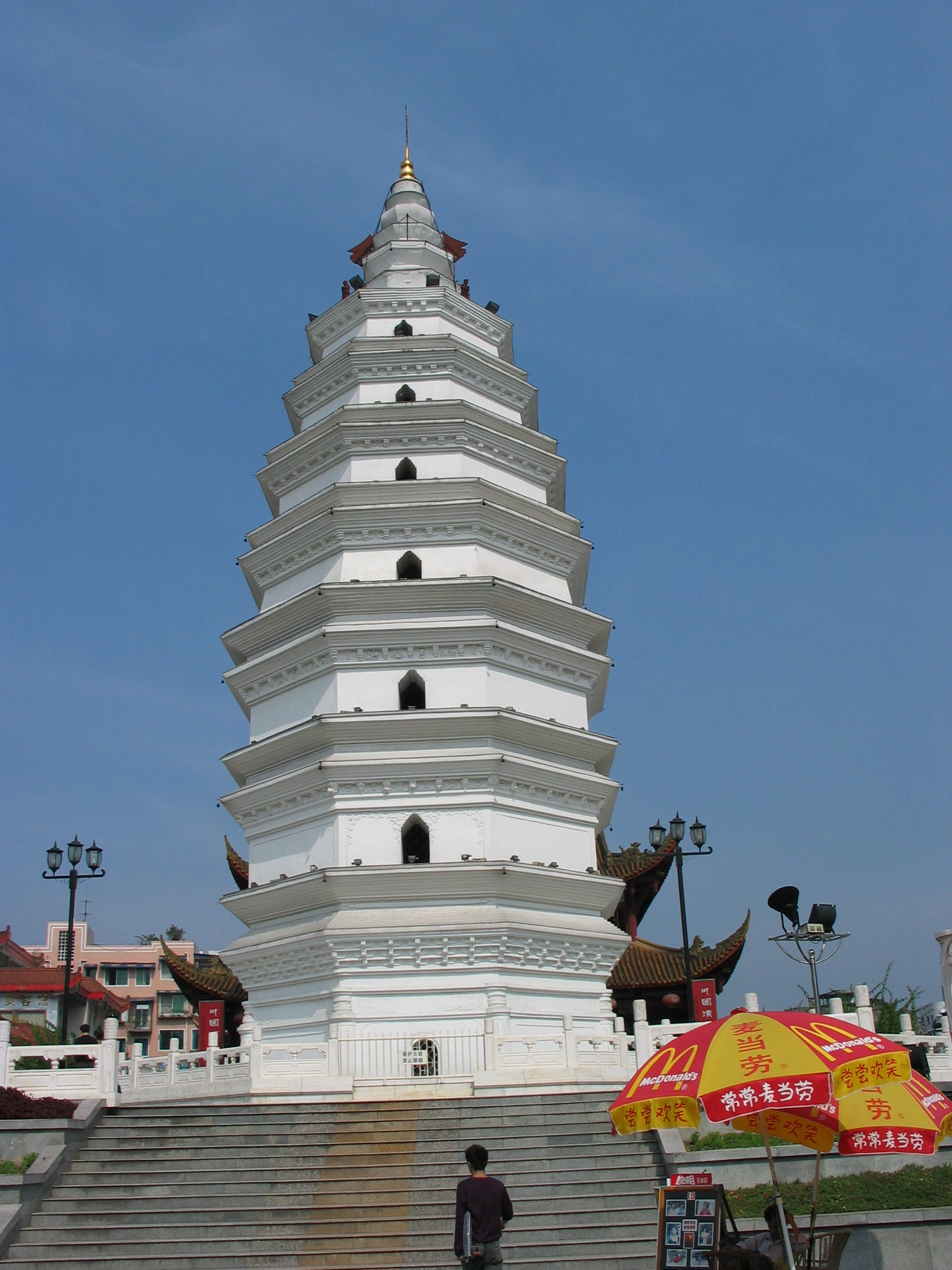
Bao'en Pagoda

=== Bao'en Pagoda ===
Located in downtown Luzhou, the Bao'en Pagoda (simplified Chinese: 报恩塔; traditional Chinese: 報恩塔; pinyin: bào'ēn tǎ) was built in 1148 at the request of southern Song dynasty, and was restored in 1983 and 1985, Qing dynasty. It is an octagon 33.3 m high, built of brick and stone in a seven-tiered pavilion style. It has a bronze top and there are 107 steps in its spiral staircase. The base is an octagon of 4.1 m per side, 4.5 m high; inside are 256 figures set in 90 niches. The pagoda was listed by the People's Government of Sichuan Province as a historical and cultural relic under provincial protection in April 1991.

=== Dragon Head Bridge ===
Constructed during the Ming dynasty, Dragon Head Bridge spans the Nine Bends Creek and is a stone bridge in the Ming dynasty style. It is 5 m high, 54 m long and 1.9 m wide, and has 14 piers. The eight midsection piers are characterized by traditionally carved auspicious beasts, such as dragons, lions, elephants and qilin. It was declared a key national cultural relic in 1996.

=== Longtou Pass ===
Longtou Pass, about 2.5 km (1.6 mi) long, is located in the southern suburban area of Luzhou. Construction began in the Han dynasty during the Guangxu Emperor's reign. Its name, Longtou Pass, derives from its resemblance to a huge dragon crossing the Tuo River in the north and Yangtze river in the south. Longtou Pass is the location where Liu Bocheng waged the Luzhou Uprising. It was listed as a protected historic and cultural relic of Luzhou in 1984 and a provincial one in 1996.

=== Guojiao Square ===
The Guojiao Square (simplified Chinese: 国窖广场; traditional Chinese: 國窖廣場; pinyin: Guójiào guángchǎng; lit. 'National Fermentation Pit Square') is a key cultural site of baijiu producer Luzhou Laojiao. Its name refers to a baijiu fermentation pit that was commissioned during the Ming dynasty in 1573 and has been in continuous operation ever since. The square is an AAAA-level scenic spot, listed under the name Luzhou Laojiao Tourism Area (simplified Chinese: 泸州老窖旅游区; traditional Chinese: 瀘州老窖旅遊區; pinyin: Lúzhōu Lǎojiào lǚyóu qū).

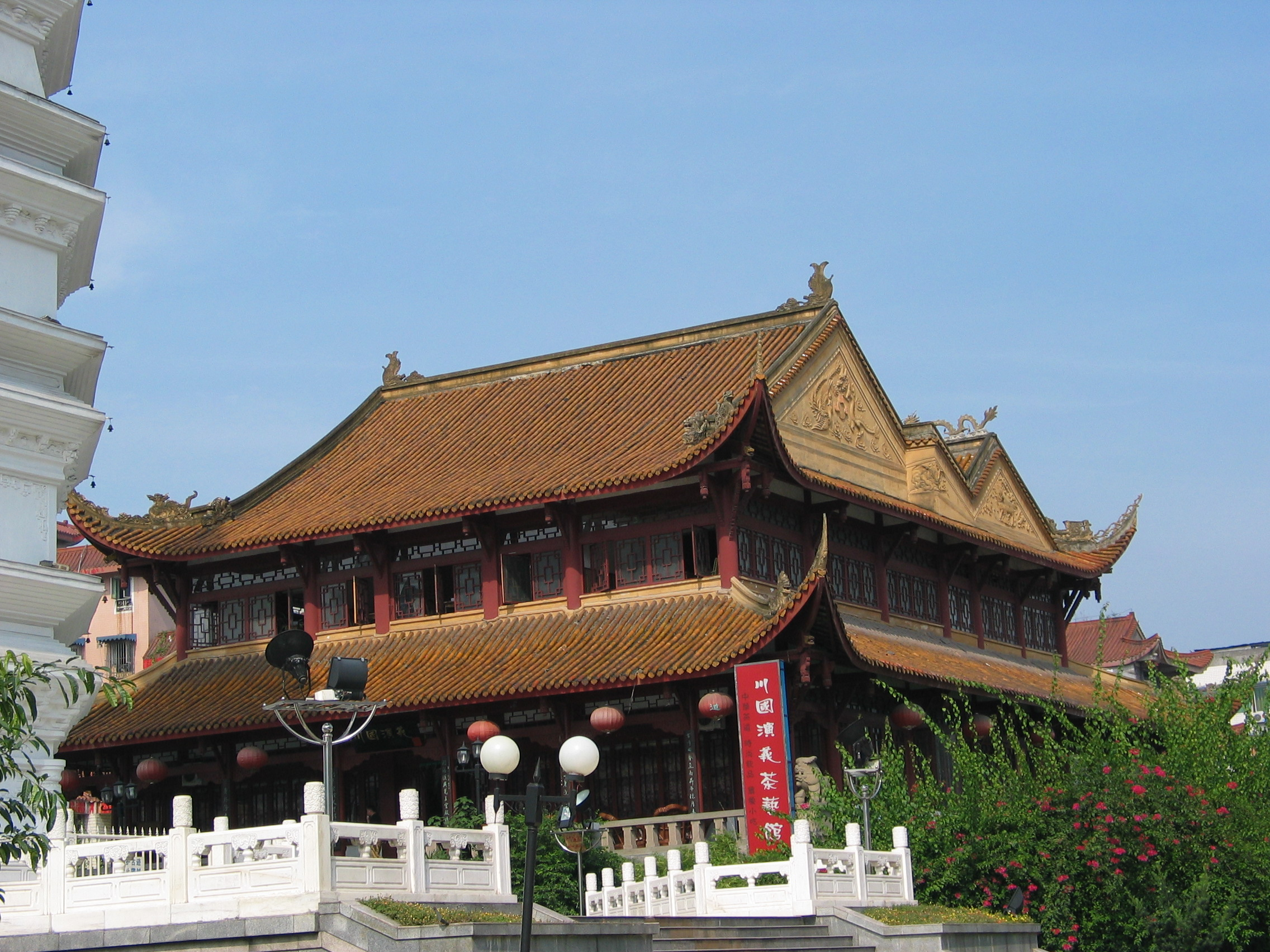
Scene of downtown Luzhou

=== Spring and Autumn Temple ===
Situated in Xuyong county, the Spring and Autumn Temple was built in 1906, during the Qing dynasty. Originally, it was a temple for Guany (the Lord of Guan) and then rebuilt as a Shaanxi salt merchants' assembly hall. It has a typical local architecture style, and has been listed as a protected historic and cultural relic of Luzhou.

=== Baizitu ===
Baizitu is situated near the Tuojiang river, in the northwestern corner of Luzhou city. It is named for the stone inscription of the Qing dynasty and was the protected historic and cultural relic of Luzhou.

=== Luzhou City Park ===
Built in 2015, Luzhou City Park is an important project of Luzhou City in order to promote the ecological environment construction, and upgrade the eco-city level of Luzhou City. The total investment of the project is about 120 million RMB and covers an area of about 107 mu. It is located in the valley of the east of Chengxi Park in Jiangyang, Luzhou. Superior, is expected to receive more than 1.5 million tourists trips each year.

== Administrative divisions ==
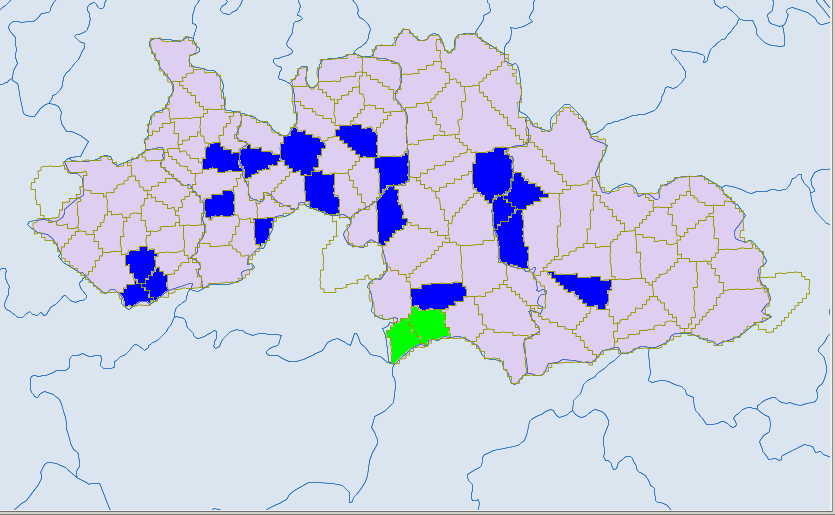
Ethnic townships in South Sichuan: Yibin and Luzhou. Light green -Yi. Blue – Miao.

Map
#	Name	Hanzi	Hanyu Pinyin	Population (12 31 2017 est.)	Area (km^{2})	Density (/km^{2})
1	Jiangyang District	江阳区	Jiāngyáng Qū	616,500	649	950
2	Naxi District	纳溪区	Nàxī Qū	488,300	1,151	407
3	Longmatan District	龙马潭区	Lóngmǎtán Qū	382,400	333	1150
4	Lu County	泸县	Lú Xiàn	870,100	1,532	568
5	Hejiang County	合江县	Héjiāng Xiàn	707,600	2,422	292
6	Xuyong County	叙永县	Xùyǒng Xiàn	581,600	2,975	195
7	Gulin County	古蔺县	Gǔlìn Xiàn	690,700	3,172	218

== Geography ==
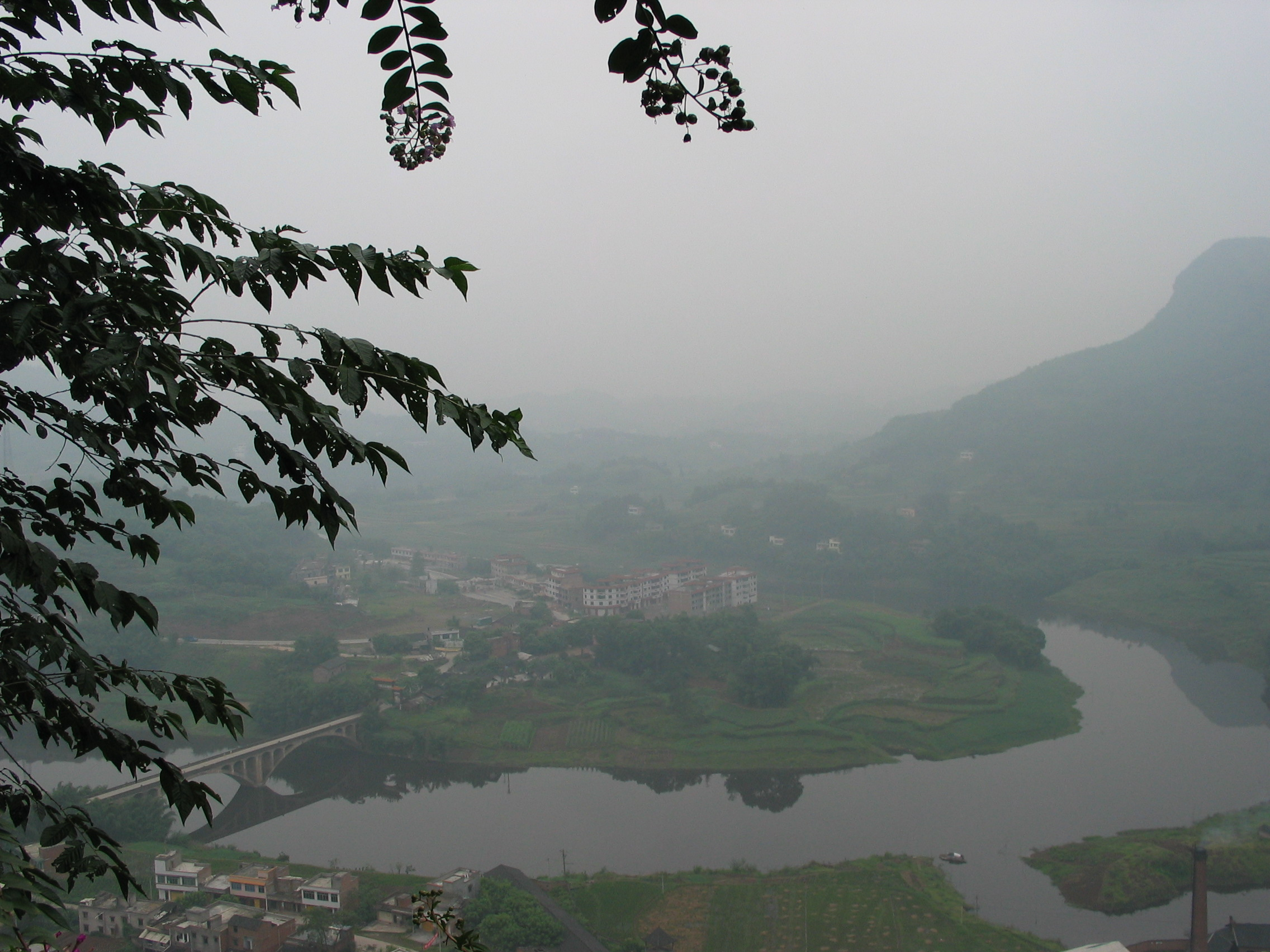
A rural township of Luzhou

=== location ===
Luzhou is situated in the southeast region of Sichuan province, at the intersection of Sichuan, Yunnan, Guizhou and Chongqing, at longitude 105° 08' 41"E ~106° 28'E and latitude 27° 39' N ~ 29° 20'N. A prefecture-level city of Sichuan with a registered population of 4.8 million, Luzhou is 267 km (166 mi) away from Chengdu, the provincial capital. It is adjacent to Chongqing in the east, borders Guizhou and Yunnan provinces in the south, Yibin City and Zizhong City in the west, Chongqing and Neijiang in the north. The city governs 7 administrative divisions, including 3 districts (Jiangyang, Longmatan, Naxi) and 4 counties (Lu, Hejiang, Xuyong, Gulin).

Owing to its position in the southern peripheral area of Sichuan Basin and the connective region with Yunnan–Guizhou Plateau, Luzhou is characterised by river valleys, hills, and level lands in the north and highland areas, and by mountains, sheer valleys, and rushing rivers in the south. Fishing and agriculture are the primary industries in the northern area, and forest and mineral resources are primary in the southern part of the region. Luzhou's lowest point is 203 metres (666 ft), at the surface of Yangtze river in Jiucengyan, Hejiang county, while the highest point is located at the peak of Liangzi mountain, Xuyong County, reaching 1,902 metres (6,240 ft). Luzhou is also a region covered by rivers. The Yangtze river flows through the whole area from west to east, covering a total course of 133 kilometres (83 mi), and the maximum flood level was 18.68 metres (61.3 ft) during the past 30 years. Other rivers converge here, such as Tuo River, Yongling River, Chishui River, and Laixi River.

=== Area ===
Covering an area of 12,246.87 square kilometres (4,728.54 sq mi), it is 121.64 kilometres (75.58 mi) wide from east to west and 181.84 kilometres (112.99 mi) long from south to north.

=== Climate ===
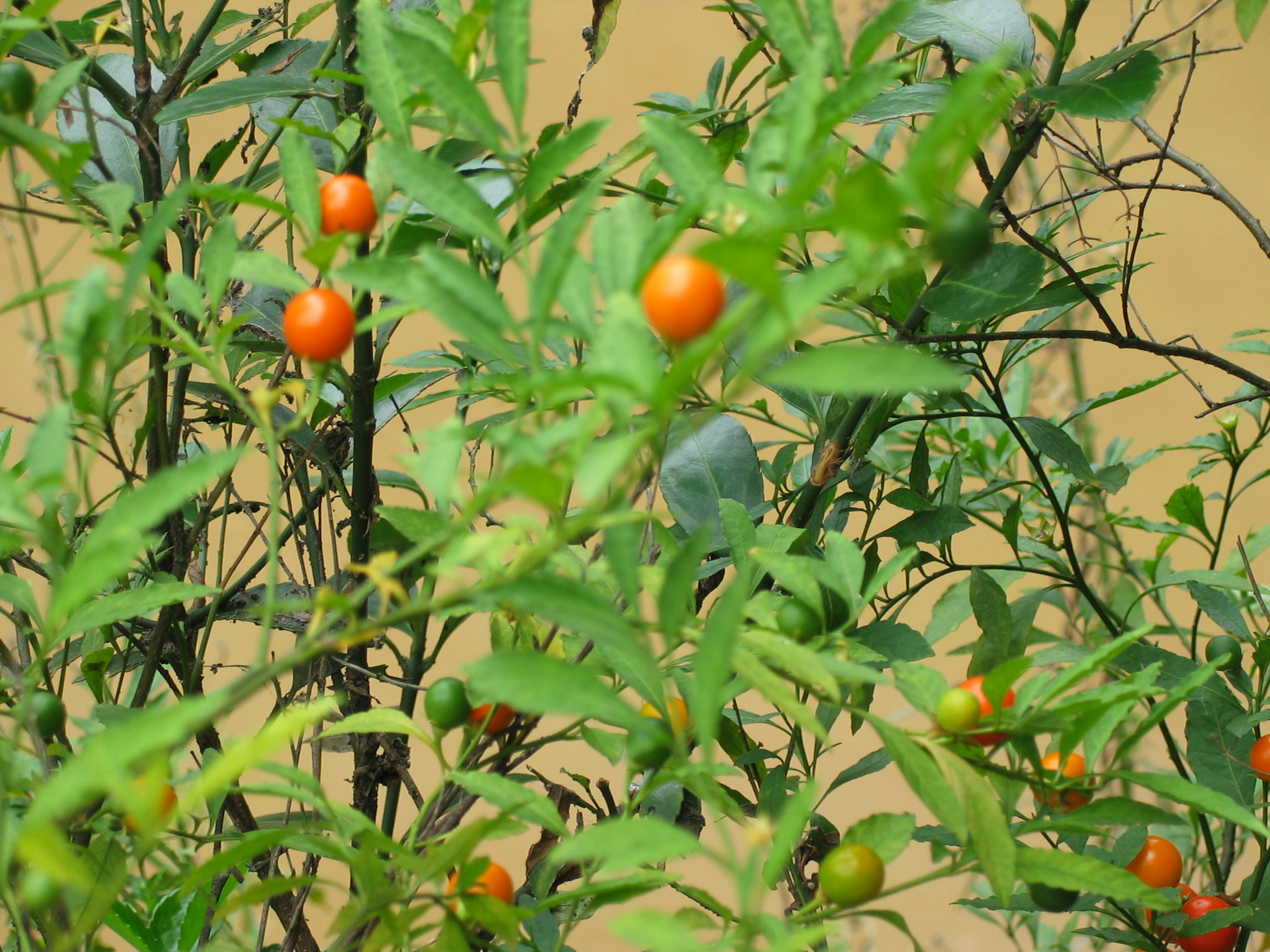
Luzhou has mild weather

Luzhou has a monsoon-influenced humid subtropical climate (Köppen Cfa) and is largely mild, except during the summer, and humid, with four distinct seasons and ample rainfall: winters are short, mild, and comparatively dry, while summers are long, hot, and humid. Within the prefecture, annual mean temperatures range from 17.1 to 18.5 °C (62.8 to 65.3 °F). In the urban area, monthly daily average temperatures range from 7.6 °C (45.7 °F) in January to around 27 °C (80.6 °F) in July and August, with August being slightly warmer. The diurnal temperature variation is 6.1 °C (11.0 °F) and is lowest during winter. Snow is rare here. The annual precipitation in the prefecture ranges from 748.4 to 1,184.2 millimetres (29.46 to 46.62 in), 70% of which occurs from May to September. Sunshine is quite low, with only 1200 to 1400 hours per year, and the frost-free period is lengthy, lasting 300 to 358 days.

Climate data for Luzhou (Naxi District), elevation 367 m (1,204 ft), (1991–2020 normals, extremes 1971–present)
Month	Jan	Feb	Mar	Apr	May	Jun	Jul	Aug	Sep	Oct	Nov	Dec	Year
Record high °C (°F)	19.7 (67.5)	24.1 (75.4)	32.5 (90.5)	35.9 (96.6)	37.5 (99.5)	37.7 (99.9)	39.5 (103.1)	42.1 (107.8)	40.4 (104.7)	33.0 (91.4)	26.9 (80.4)	18.8 (65.8)	42.1 (107.8)
Mean daily maximum °C (°F)	9.9 (49.8)	13.0 (55.4)	18.0 (64.4)	23.5 (74.3)	26.7 (80.1)	28.5 (83.3)	31.9 (89.4)	32.1 (89.8)	27.0 (80.6)	21.0 (69.8)	16.7 (62.1)	11.1 (52.0)	21.6 (70.9)
Daily mean °C (°F)	7.5 (45.5)	9.9 (49.8)	14.0 (57.2)	18.8 (65.8)	22.0 (71.6)	24.2 (75.6)	27.0 (80.6)	27.0 (80.6)	22.9 (73.2)	18.0 (64.4)	13.8 (56.8)	8.8 (47.8)	17.8 (64.1)
Mean daily minimum °C (°F)	5.7 (42.3)	7.7 (45.9)	11.1 (52.0)	15.3 (59.5)	18.5 (65.3)	21.2 (70.2)	23.5 (74.3)	23.3 (73.9)	20.2 (68.4)	16.0 (60.8)	11.7 (53.1)	7.2 (45.0)	15.1 (59.2)
Record low °C (°F)	−1.1 (30.0)	−0.7 (30.7)	1.8 (35.2)	5.8 (42.4)	9.6 (49.3)	15.0 (59.0)	17.6 (63.7)	17.6 (63.7)	13.4 (56.1)	6.3 (43.3)	1.7 (35.1)	−2.0 (28.4)	−2.0 (28.4)
Average precipitation mm (inches)	32.2 (1.27)	26.8 (1.06)	50.1 (1.97)	85.2 (3.35)	122.1 (4.81)	193.0 (7.60)	166.2 (6.54)	156.9 (6.18)	132.9 (5.23)	93.5 (3.68)	45.8 (1.80)	32.2 (1.27)	1,136.9 (44.76)
Average precipitation days (≥ 0.1 mm)	13.5	11.2	12.9	14.0	15.8	17.5	13.4	11.9	14.9	18.2	13.2	13.4	169.9
Average snowy days	0.3	0.1	0	0	0	0	0	0	0	0	0	0.2	0.6
Average relative humidity (%)	87	83	79	78	79	85	81	79	84	89	87	88	83
Mean monthly sunshine hours	32.3	52.7	94.4	123.7	127.3	110.5	184.6	186.1	103.4	52.3	50.6	29.6	1,147.5
Percentage possible sunshine	10	17	25	32	30	26	43	46	28	15	16	9	25
Source 1: China Meteorological Administration
Source 2: Weather China

== Politics ==
=== Current Leadership (as of June 2025) ===
Current Leaders of Luzhou's Four Major Institutions
mechanism	Chinese Communist Party Luzhou Municipal Committee	Luzhou Municipal People's Congress Standing Committee	Luzhou Municipal People's Government	Chinese People's Political Consultative Conference Luzhou Municipal Committee
Position	secretary	director	mayor	President
Name	Liu Xiaoliu (刘筱柳)	Ju Li（鞠丽）	Zhang Wei（张伟）	Tian Yadong（田亚东）
nationality	Han	Han	Han	Han
Native Place	Chengdu, Sichuan Province	Nanchong City, Sichuan Province	Hebei Province	Zhongjiang County, Sichuan Province
Date of birth	March 1971 (age 55)	June 1966 (age 60)	September 1976 (age 50)	February 1962 (age 64)
Date of appointment	Cheng read, SI wear province	January 2022	April 2025	January 2017

=== Previous leaders ===
Municipal Party Committee Secretary

- Zhao Xiyao (May 1983 – August 1985)
- Lu Senling (August 1985 – October 1987)
- Liu Yuren (October 1987 – March 1994)
- Yang Yunhong (March 1994 – August 2000)
- Li Chuncheng (August 2000 – January 2001)
- Xu Bo (January 2001 – June 2006)
- Yuan Benpu (June 2006 – June 2008)
- Zhu Yizhuang (June 2008 – August 2011)
- Liu Guoqiang (August 2011-February 2013)
- Jiang Fuyi (February 2013-October 2018)
- Liu Qiang (October 2018-April 2021)
- Yang Linxing (April 2021-September 2024)
- Liu Xiaoliu (September 2024-)

Mayor

- Liu Yuren (August 1983 – September 1988)
- Cao Xisen (September 1988 – April 1993)
- Xian Kaijin (April 1993 – January 2001)
- Xiao Tianren (January 2001 – August 2005)
- Zhu Yizhuang (August 2005 – May 2008)
- Liu Guoqiang (May 2008 – November 2011)
- Liu Qiang (November 2011 – October 2018)
- Yang Linxing (October 2018 – May 2021)
- Yu Xianhe (May 2021 – April 2025)
- Zhang Wei (April 2025 -)

== Economy ==
Luzhou has always been a hub of economic activities in the tri-province border area of Sichuan, Yunnan, and Guizhou. Food, liquor, and chemicals production, along with construction equipment manufacturing are the most important industries of the local economy. In 2006, Luzhou's total GDP reached 33.11 billion yuan (7,819 yuan per capita).

=== Liquor industry ===
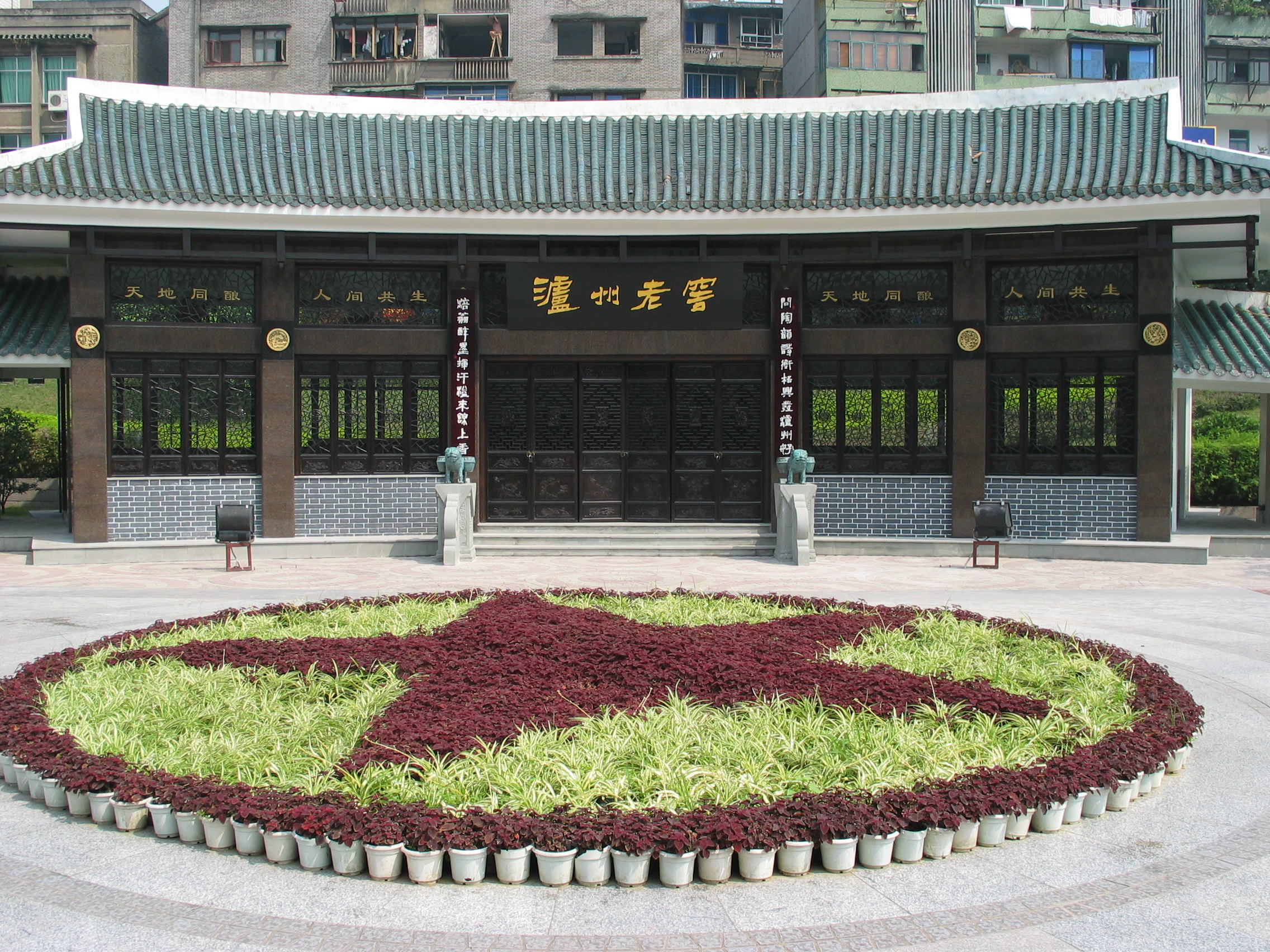
Site of the original Luzhou Old Fermentation Pit

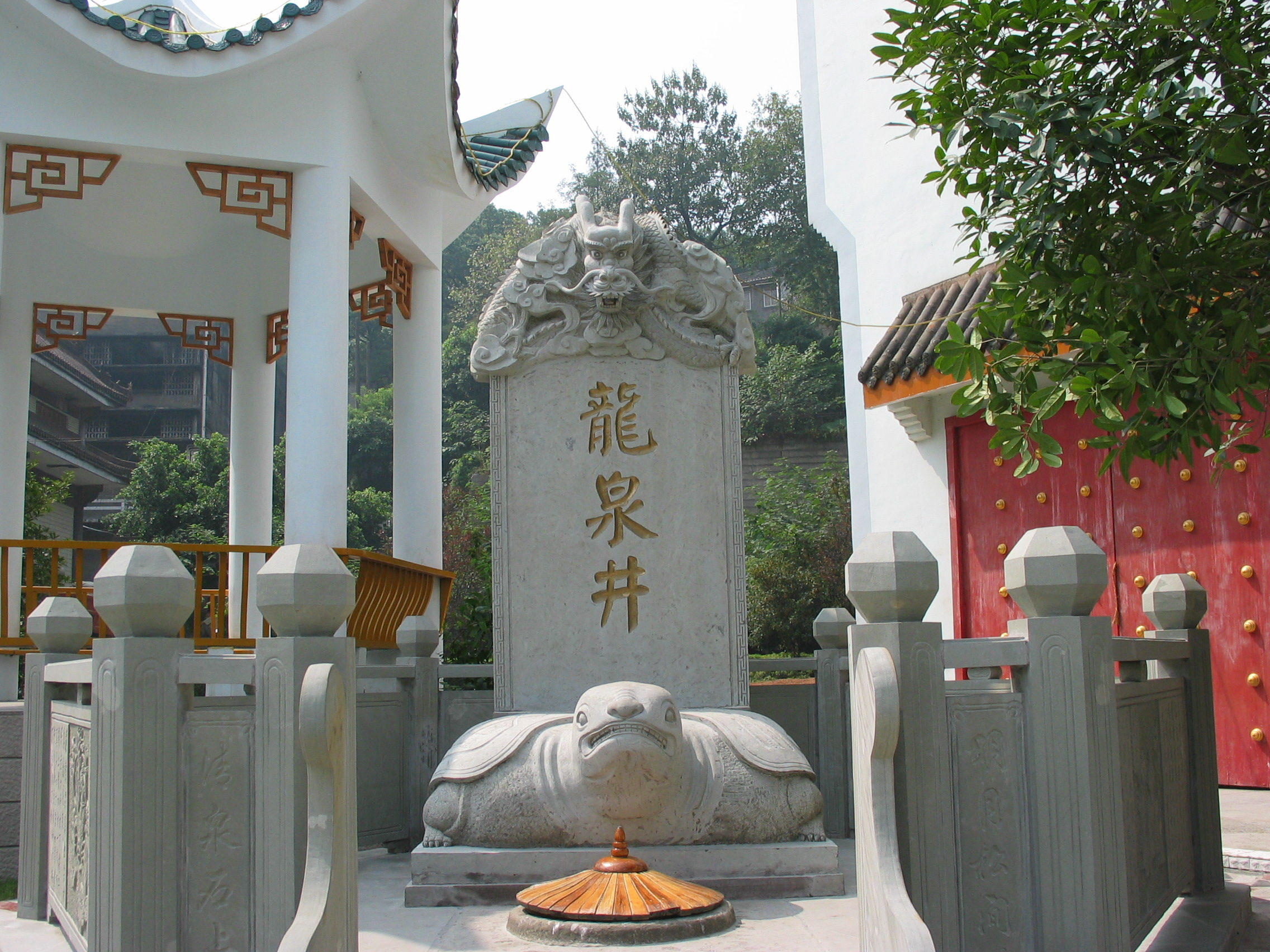
Site of the original Luzhou Old Fermentation Pit

Luzhou is a center of liquor production, particularly baijiu. Luzhou Laojiao (Chinese: 泸州老窖; lit. 'Luzhou Old Fermentation Pit') and Gulin Langjiu (Chinese: 古蔺郎酒) are the two best known brands with national and international reputation.

=== Machine construction industry ===
Luzhou is a manufacturing center of hydraulic trucks, cranes and excavators in China. Among the cities along the Yangtze River, Luzhou is the second largest producer of hydraulic trucks, after Shanghai.

=== Chemical industry ===
The chemical industry, particularly natural gas production, is also important to Luzhou's economy. At present, Luzhou has developed a national chemical industry system covering production, education, scientific research, design, machine and architecture. A group of national large scale enterprises have been established and achieved a globally advanced level. Lutianhua enterprise is the most extensive carbamide and oil chemical production base in China, producing fatty acid, fatty amine, synthetic ammonia, and carbamide. Its annual output of carbamide is 1.24 million tons and 0.9 million tons of synthetic ammonia. It is one of the 500 largest national enterprises. Tianhua Co, Ltd is a key enterprise which brings in 0.3 million tons of synthetic ammonia and 0.6 million tons of carbamide, processing two sets of chemical fertilizer devices with world technical levels. Luzhou Chemical Factory participates in military and civil chemical production. State-owned Torch Chemical Factory is the only producer of "801". It gained the national quality golden award, surpassing the America Standard.

=== Tourism industry ===
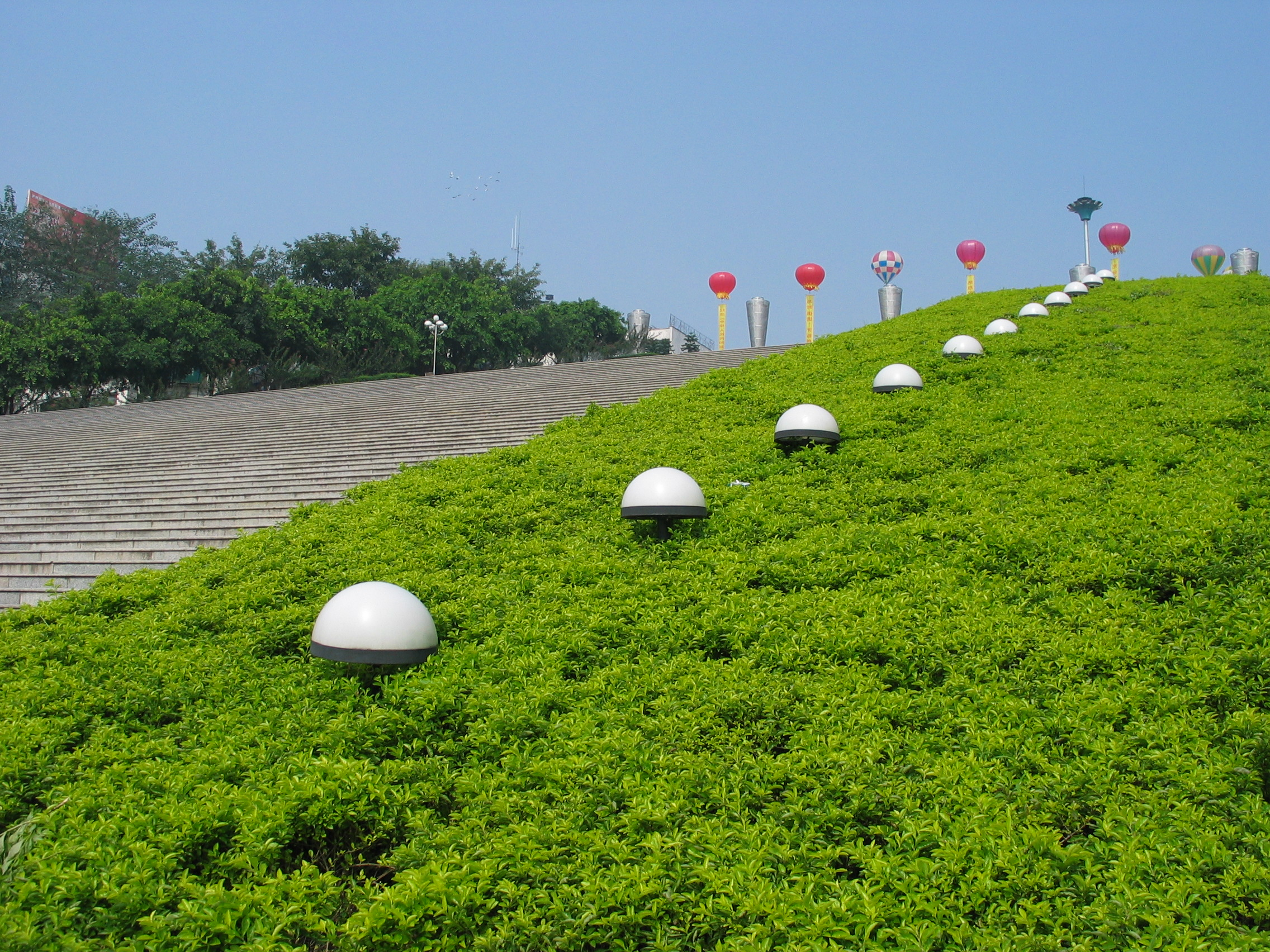
Downtown Luzhou

Luzhou is a tourist destination; specific scenic spots include Yuchan in Luxian county, Fobao in Hejiang county, Mt. Fangshan in Jiangyang county, the lychee and longan orchard along the Yangtze River and Tuojiang River, and many others. With the official approbation of the National Ministry of Forestry, Fobao Forest Park became a National Forestry Park and was classified as an "AAA" tourist attraction in 2001 by the National Tourism Administration.

Luzhou and Xuyong county have national cultural significance. The Luzhou Old Fermentation Pit (Luzhou Laojiao, 泸州老窖) and Dragon Head Bridge are listed as key protected cultural relics of the nation. There are more than ten protected historical relics in Sichuan Province, including the site of the Battle of Chishui River. This site was chosen as the "National Demonstration Base for Patriotic Education" by the Central Propaganda Ministry in 2001.

The Sci-tech Park of Luzhou Laojiao is a national industry tourism demonstration spot and Luzhou Zhangba Longan Orchard is a national agricultural tourism spot. Other scenic areas nearby include Leshan, Yibin, Zigong and Chongqing, such as the Bamboo Forest, Mt. Simianshan in Chongqing and Sidong Channel in Guizhou Province.

=== Agriculture ===
Luzhou is a key comprehensive development zone in the upper Yangtze River and Sichuan province as well as an important production base for rice, fruit such as litchi and longan, cured tobacco, poultry, tea, and traditional Chinese medicine ingredients.

=== Free Trade Zone ===
The Sichuan Pilot Free Trade Zone (FTZ) officially launched on 1 April 2017, forms part of a third batch of government-endorsed pilot FTZs. All told, the zone covers an area of 119.99 km^{2} and consists of three sub-zones: The Chengdu Tianfu New Area (90.32 km^{2} inclusive of the Chengdu High-Tech Comprehensive Bonded Area 4 (Shuangliu Park) (4 km^{2}) and the Chengdu Airport Bonded Logistics Centre (Type B) (0.09 km^{2})), the Chengdu Qingbaijiang Railway Port Area (9.68 km^{2} inclusive of the Chengdu Railway Bonded Logistics Centre (Type B) (0.18 km^{2})), and the Chuannan Lingang Area (19.99 km^{2} inclusive of the Luzhou Port Bonded Logistics Centre (Type B) (0.21 km^{2})).

The Chuannan Lingang Area will focus on developing a range of high quality professional services, including shipping logistics, port trade, education and medical support. As part of its remit, it will also look to nurture the advanced manufacturing industries, as well as looking to take a lead in a number of other sectors, including equipment manufacturing, medicine and food/beverages. Furthermore, it will play a key role in the development of an integrated transport hub, which will provide streamlined connections between the Chengdu-Chongqing city cluster and Yunnan and Guizhou, its southerly neighbours.

== Transport ==
Huangyi Yangtze River Bridge

Expressways connecting to Chengdu and Chongqing were completed in the 1990s. Railroads and an airport provide additional links to several cities in China. The city has four bridges over the Yangtze which form part of Sichuan's overland corridor to the South China Sea.

=== Road ===
The G76 Xiamen-Chengdu Expressway connects Luzhou to Chengdu and Guiyang, the G93 Chengdu Ring Expressway connects Luzhou to Chongqing, and the G4215 Chengdu-Zunyi Expressway connects Luzhou to Chengdu and Zunyi. Other main highways include G321, G353 Heze-Baoji, the national highway and several provincial highways.

=== Rail ===
Luzhou is served by a freight-only branch. A passenger service briefly operated but was cancelled in 1995. A new railway station served by multiple high-speed lines has opened on June 28, 2021, with links to Chengdu and various other cities.

=== Luzhou Port ===
Luzhou is an important inland port serving as a transshipment point for goods heading to cities deeper into Sichuan such as Chengdu. Making it the largest river port in Sichuan on the upper Yangtze, with the capability to load and unload container ships. The Luzhou International Container Pier handled over 500,000 containers in 2016.

=== Luzhou Airport ===
Luzhou Lantian Airport was built in 1945 and initially provided an air route between China and India for the US Air Force during World War II. Services were suspended in the 1960s, but later it was used for training purposes by the Chinese Air Force. Major renovations and expansions were completed in January 2001, and now the airport serves direct flights to Beijing, Shanghai, Guangzhou, Kunming, Guiyang, Shenzhen, Xiamen, Hangzhou, Haikou, Changsha, Nanning, Xi'an, Daocheng Yading Airport, Lanzhou, Lijiang, Nanjing, Wuhan and Zhengzhou. The new Luzhou Yunlong Airport opened in September 2018, and all services were transferred from Lantian to the new location, 11 km north of the city.

== Cuisine ==
Luzhou White Cake: Luzhou White Cake is one of the traditional specialty snacks of Luzhou, Sichuan, made primarily from glutinous rice.

Luzhou Piglet Cake: Piglet Cake is one of the traditional snacks of Luzhou. The outer skin is made of glutinous rice flour, and the filling is usually savory ingredients such as pickled mustard greens and pork.

Gulin Spicy Chicken: Gulin Spicy Chicken is one of the representative dishes of Gulin County, Luzhou City. It uses chicken, chili peppers and Sichuan peppercorns as the main ingredients. It has a spicy and fragrant flavor and has a typical Sichuan cuisine style.

Hejiang Grilled Fish: Popular in Hejiang County, Hejiang grilled fish is made with freshwater fish from the Yangtze River basin. After being grilled over charcoal, it is cooked with chili peppers, broad bean paste and other seasonings, resulting in a rich flavor.

Luzhou Red Soup Mutton: Luzhou red soup mutton is a common winter delicacy in Luzhou. It is made by simmering mutton with chili peppers and spices. The soup is bright red and spicy and fragrant, which is a characteristic of southern Sichuan cuisine.

== Education ==
- Southwest Medical University (西南医科大学)
- Sichuan Police College (四川警察学院)
- Luzhou Vocational and Technical College] (泸州职业技术学院)
- Sichuan Vocational College of Chemical Technology (四川化工职业技术学院)
- Sichuan Sanhe College of Professionals (四川三河职业技术学院)

== Notable people ==
- Gu Yi, student dissident and human rights activist
- Wan Shenzi, Qing-era couplet writer
- Yin Jifu, minister to King Xuan of Zhou
- Zou Kai, artistic gymnast
- Yang Yu, animation director, screenwriter, and producer
