= Turpan Jiaohe Airport =

Airport in Xinjiang, China

Turpan Jiaohe Airport 吐鲁番交河机场
- IATA: TLQ; ICAO: ZWTP

Summary
- Airport type: Public
- Serves: Turpan, Xinjiang, China
- Opened: 9 July 2010; 16 years ago
- Elevation AMSL: 925 ft (282 m)
- Coordinates: 43°1′50″N 89°6′2″E

Map
- Location of airport in Xinjiang

Runways
Direction	Length		Surface
Direction	m	ft	Surface
09/27	3,200	10,499	Concrete

Statistics (2025)
- Passengers: 886,878
- Aircraft movements: 12,666
- Cargo (metric tons): 144.1

Turpan Jiaohe Airport
- Simplified Chinese: 吐鲁番交河机场
- Traditional Chinese: 吐魯番交河機場
Transcriptions
Standard Mandarin
- Hanyu Pinyin: Tǔlǔfān Jiāohé Jīchǎng

Turpan Jiaohe Airport (IATA: TLQ, ICAO: ZWTP) is an airport serving the city of Turpan in Xinjiang Uyghur Autonomous Region, China. It is located 10 kilometers northwest of the city, and named after the Jiaohe Ruins. First built in the 1950s but out of use by the 1970s, the airport was relocated and rebuilt at the current site starting May 2009, with an investment of 430 million yuan. Turpan Airport was reopened on 9 July 2010. The runway is 2,500 metres (8,200 ft) long.

== History ==
The history of aviation in Turpan can be traced back to the 1950s. In 1954, the Urumqi Administration of the Civil Aviation Administration of China established Jiaohe Airport in Turpan.

The airport ceased operations in 1985, and the navigation equipment were dismantled. In 2008, the Turpan Jiaohe Airport was officially relocated. On May 6, 2009, construction officially began on a new airport located 13 kilometers northwest of Turpan, with an investment of 430 million yuan. It was completed and accepted at the end of May 2010, and officially opened for business on July 9, 2010.

On November 22, 2016, Turpan Jiaohe Airport officially renewed its Airport Operation Permit, upgrading its flight zone level from 4D to 4E and its fire protection level to level 8, which could be used for take-off and landing of Boeing 747-400. It became the third 4E-class airport in Xinjiang and was positioned as the main alternate airport for Urumqi International Airport.

In October 2019, Urumqi Tianshan International Airport (formerly Urumqi Diwopu International Airport) and Turpan Airport officially merged for operation and management. Turpan Airport was also gradually changed its role from the main alternate airport of Urumqi International Airport to the second airport of Urumqi International Airport. In 2019, the airport opened 15 routes, connecting 21 cities, with 6,215 takeoffs and landings and nearly 350,000 passengers.

In 2020, the airport launched an expansion and renovation project, extending the runway 400 meters eastward to 3,200 meters, expanding the apron westward to increase the number of parking stands to 21, and constructing a new terminal building with an area of over 10,000 square meters and related supporting facilities. The aircraft maintenance, security inspection and ground service business of Turpan Airport were transferred to the aircraft maintenance engineering department, security inspection station, passenger service department and Xinjiang Tianyuan International Logistics Company of Urumqi International Airport Branch. Turpan Airport is responsible for operation coordination and supervision.

On March 5, 2021, the Civil Aviation Administration of China approved the opening of the 3200-meter runway at Turpan Jiaohe Airport; on April 22, the runway was put into use.

== Airlines and destinations ==
Airlines	Destinations
9 Air	Xi'an
Air Travel	Changsha, Kunming
Chengdu Airlines	Aksu, Altay, Aral, Bole, Chengdu–Shuangliu, Chengdu–Tianfu, Fuyun, Hotan, Karamay, Kashgar, Kuqa, Qiemo, Ruoqiang, Shache, Tacheng, Tumxuk, Yining, Zhongwei
China United Airlines	Beijing–Daxing, Ordos
Ruili Airlines	Charter: Kunming
Suparna Airlines	Longnan, Shenzhen

== Ground transportation ==
The Turpan North Railway Station of the Lanzhou–Ürümqi High-Speed Railway, opened in November 2014, is located within 500 m from the airport.

== See also ==
- List of airports in China
- List of the busiest airports in China
