= QSZ =

QSZ may refer to:

- Shache Airport, IATA code QSZ
- QSZ-class submersible
- QSZ-92 pistol
