= Fyn (disambiguation) =

Fyn or FYN may refer to:

- Fyn, or Funen, Denmark
- Fyn (Folketing constituency)
- FYN, encoding the proto-oncogene tyrosine-protein kinase Fyn
- Freshwater, Yarmouth and Newport Railway, a defunct railway of England
- Fuyun Koktokay Airport, in Xinjiang, China
- Federal Yugoslav Navy, the navy of the Federal Republic of Yugoslavia
