= Zhaosu Tianma Airport =

Airport in Xinjiang, China

Zhaosu Tianma Airport 昭苏天马机场
- IATA: ZFL; ICAO: ZWZS

Summary
- Airport type: Public
- Serves: Zhaosu County, Xinjiang, China
- Coordinates: 43°6′27″N 81°9′38″E

Map
- Location of airport in Xinjiang

Runways
Direction	Length		Surface
Direction	m	ft	Surface
06/24	2,800	9,186

Zhaosu Tianma Airport

Chinese name
- Simplified Chinese: 昭苏天马机场
- Traditional Chinese: 昭蘇天馬機場
Transcriptions
Standard Mandarin
- Hanyu Pinyin: Zhāosū Tiānmǎ Jīchǎng

Uyghur name
- Uyghur: موڭغۇلكۈرە ئايرودرومى

Kazakh name
- Kazakh: موڭعولكۇرە اۋەجايى; Моңғолкүре әуежайы Moñğolküre äuejaiy

Zhaosu Tianma Airport is an airport in Zhaosu County, Ili Prefecture, Xinjiang, China. The construction budget is CN¥636.23 million. Construction for the 14 kilometres (8.7 mi) airport road began in 2017.

The airport will have a 2,800-metre (9,200 ft) runway (class 4C), a 3,000-square-metre (32,000 sq ft) terminal building, and five aircraft parking aprons. It is designed to serve 200,000 passengers and 600 tons of cargo annually by 2025.

The airport opened on January 28, 2022.

== Airlines and destinations ==
Airlines	Destinations
China Eastern Airlines	Shanghai-Hongqiao, Urumqi
China Express Airlines	Aksu, Karamay
Tianjin Airlines	Urumqi

== See also ==
- List of airports in China
- List of the busiest airports in China
