= Hami Yizhou Airport =

Airport in Xinjiang, China

Hami Yizhou Airport 哈密伊州机场 قۇمۇل ئايروپورتى
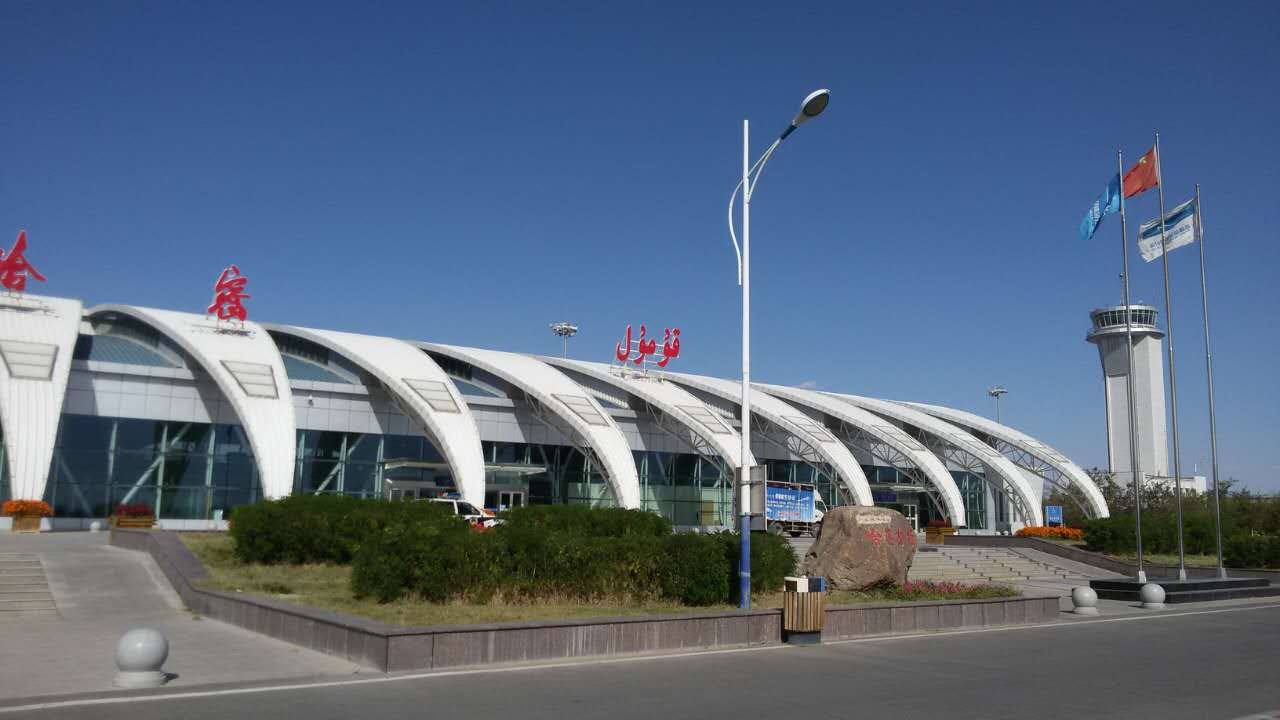
- IATA: HMI; ICAO: ZWHM

Summary
- Airport type: Public / military
- Location: Yizhou, Hami, Xinjiang, China
- Opened: 1934; 92 years ago
- Elevation AMSL: 824 m / 2,703 ft
- Coordinates: 42°50′33″N 93°40′10″E

Map
- Location of airport in Xinjiang

Runways
Direction	Length		Surface
Direction	m	ft	Surface
11/29	2,400	7,874	Concrete

Statistics (2025)
- Passengers: 1,085,699 ▲84.4%
- Aircraft movements: 12,168 ▲90.5%
- Cargo (metric tons): 946.7 ▲40.6%
- Sources: China's busiest airports by passenger traffic, CAAC

Hami Yizhou Airport
- Simplified Chinese: 哈密伊州机场
- Traditional Chinese: 哈密伊州機場
Transcriptions
Standard Mandarin
- Hanyu Pinyin: Hāmì Yīzhōu Jīchǎng

Hami Yizhou Airport or Kumul Airport (IATA: HMI, ICAO: ZWHM) is an airport serving the city of Hami (Kumul) in Xinjiang Uygur Autonomous Region, China. It is located 12.5 kilometres (7.8 mi) northeast of the city center. First built in 1934 and later used as a military airport, it was expanded in 2008 and is now for mixed military and public use.

== History ==
Hami Airport was completed and opened to traffic in 1932, launching the Shanghai-Hami-Moscow-Berlin route, one of the few international routes at the time. In 1934, a civil aviation terminal was officially established at Hami Airport and served as an important channel for transferring anti-Japanese supplies from the Soviet Union during the War of Resistance against Japan.

In 1950, Hami Airport began its first civil aviation service after the founding of the People's Republic of China (PRC), with the Sino-Soviet Civil Aviation Administration opening the Jiuquan-Hami-Urumqi-Almaty route, also one of the few international routes after the founding of the PRC.

In 1964, Hami Airport was rebuilt on its original site and converted into a joint military-civilian airport. In 1978, Hami Airport closed its civil aviation operations, and the Hami Aviation Terminal was abolished. In 1981, Hami Airport ceased operations.

On December 16, 2008, Hami Airport, which had been closed for nearly 30 years, successfully resumed operations after undergoing a renovation and expansion project. Hami Airport is a joint military-civilian airport and the fourteenth airport managed by Xinjiang Airport Group. The Hami Airport renovation and expansion project, with a total investment of 159.53 million yuan, commenced construction on August 7, 2007, and passed final acceptance on December 8, 2008. The airport is classified as 4C and can accommodate Boeing 737-700 series aircraft; its designed annual passenger throughput is 280,000, cargo and mail throughput is 1,663 tons, and annual takeoffs and landings are 4,551. Currently, a round-trip route between Hami and Urumqi is in operation.

On June 8, 2015, the Hami Airport expansion and renovation project was officially launched. The expansion was carried out without interrupting the airport operations. The project aimed at improving the runway, taxiway and apron, with the aim of improving the airport's operational capacity and support level.

In 2016, the Hami Airport flight area expansion and renovation project was put into operation, and the flight area rating was changed to 4D.

In September 2022, Hami Airport was officially renamed Hami Yizhou Airport.

== Airlines and destinations ==
Airlines	Destinations
Air China	Beijing–Capital, Chengdu–Tianfu
Chengdu Airlines	Aksu, Changsha, Hotan, Jinan, Kashgar
China Express Airlines	Aksu, Altay, Chongqing, Dunhuang, Karamay, Kashgar, Korla, Kuqa, Lanzhou, Qitai, Shache, Shihezi, Yinchuan, Yining
China Southern Airlines	Zhengzhou
Fuzhou Airlines	Xiamen, Zhengzhou
Suparna Airlines	Luoyang, Shanghai–Pudong
Tianjin Airlines	Ürümqi, Xi'an

== See also ==
- List of airports in China
- List of the busiest airports in China
