= Tacheng Qianquan Airport =

Airport in Xinjiang, China

Tacheng Qianquan Airport 塔城千泉机场
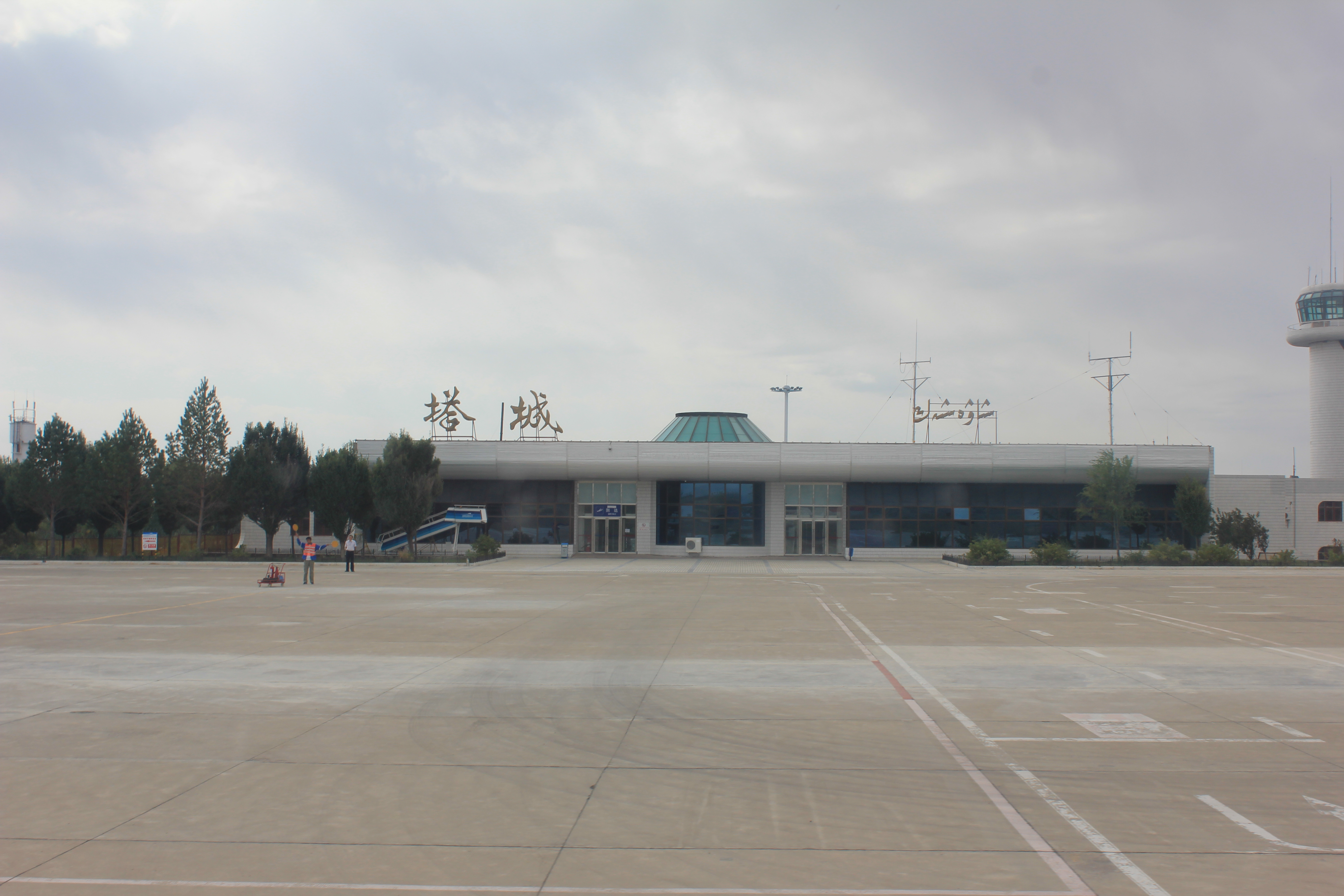
- IATA: TCG; ICAO: ZWTC

Summary
- Airport type: Public
- Serves: Tacheng, Xinjiang, China
- Opened: 21 September 1995; 30 years ago
- Elevation AMSL: 604 m / 1,982 ft
- Coordinates: 46°40′21″N 83°20′27″E

Map
- Location of airport in Xinjiang

Runways
Direction	Length		Surface
Direction	m	ft	Surface
12/30	2,380	7,808

Statistics (2025)
- Passengers: 611,898
- Aircraft movements: 50,834
- Cargo (metric tons): 339.6

Tacheng Qianquan Airport
- Simplified Chinese: 塔城千泉机场
- Traditional Chinese: 塔城千泉機場
Transcriptions
Standard Mandarin
- Hanyu Pinyin: Tǎchéng Qiānquán Jīchǎng

Tacheng Qianquan Airport (IATA: TCG, ICAO: ZWTC) is an airport serving Tacheng, a city in Xinjiang Uyghur Autonomous Region, China.

== History ==
On September 11, 1990, the relocation project of Tacheng Airport was jointly approved by the State Council and the Central Military Commission.

Tacheng Airport was invested by the state and the autonomous region with nearly 80 million yuan and construction began in July 1992. The runway is 2,400 meters long and 45 meters wide. The original design was for Boeing 737 jet airliners. The construction work of the airport terminal building started in 1993. The airport is located about 28.5 km from the city center of Tacheng and is positioned as a domestic feeder airport. On September 21, 1995, Tacheng Airport was completed and opened to traffic.

Less than six months after its opening, in March 1996, quality problems were discovered on the concrete runway, leading to the airport's closure for inspection and repair. A survey report released in October 1997 revealed serious issues with the runway surface, including peeling, flaking, holes, potholes, a network of cracks, and through-cracks. The largest pothole was 15cm in diameter and 9 cm deep.

Tacheng Airport underwent a pavement resurfacing project in 2003. The runway was covered with asphalt concrete with a thickness of 13cm, and the connecting taxiway was covered with a thickness of 12cm. The airport's flight zone rating was also upgraded to 4C, allowing the maximum permitted aircraft type to be a Boeing 737-700.

In May 2011, the project to construct a new instrument landing system and navigational lighting at Tacheng Airport was approved. Construction officially commenced on August 1, 2012. Flight calibration was completed on August 27, 2012. The project was completed on October 5, 2012, and final acceptance test was completed on October 18, 2012. On January 9, 2013, the newly built Instrument Landing System and Navigation Lighting System passed industry acceptance test.

In September 2016, the Civil Aviation Administration of Xinjiang officially approved the preliminary design and budget for the expansion and renovation project of Tacheng Airport. On September 28, the Tacheng Airport expansion and renovation project officially commenced. The project was to upgrade the airport to 4C level, enabling it to accommodate a variety of aircraft, including the Boeing 737-800. The existing runway would be extended westward by 400 meters to 2,800 meters, and a new apron with a capacity of 10 aircraft was also planned. The total investment for the project was estimated at 580 million yuan. One year later, in September 2017, the project was completed and the airport passed the performance-based navigation (PBN) procedure test flight.

In 2021, Tacheng Airport was renamed Tacheng Qianquan Airport.

== Facilities ==
The airport is at an elevation of 1,980 feet (604 m) above mean sea level. It has one runway designated 12/30 which measures 2,380 by 45 metres (7,808 ft × 148 ft)

== Airlines and destinations ==
Airlines	Destinations
Chengdu Airlines	Aksu, Altay, Chengdu–Tianfu, Fuzhou, Hotan, Kashgar, Turpan, Yining, Zhengzhou
China Eastern Airlines	Beijing–Daxing, Xi'an
China Express Airlines	Bole, Korla
China Southern Airlines	Shenyang, Shihezi, Ürümqi
Tianjin Airlines	Ürümqi

== See also ==
- List of airports in China
