= Luoyang Beijiao Airport =

Luoyang Beijiao Airport 洛阳北郊机场
- IATA: LYA; ICAO: ZHLY

Summary
- Airport type: Public
- Operator: 3rd Branch School, Civil Aviation Flight University of China
- Serves: Luoyang, Henan, China
- Location: Mengjin County
- Elevation AMSL: 256 m (840 ft)
- Coordinates: 34°44′28″N 112°23′18″E

Map
- Location in Henan LYA/ZHLY (China)

Runways
Direction	Length		Surface
Direction	m	ft	Surface
08/26	2,500	8,202	concrete

Statistics (2025)
- Passengers: 954,917
- Aircraft movements: 186,600
- Cargo (metric tons): 617.4
- Source: List of the busiest airports in the People's Republic of China

Luoyang Beijiao Airport
- Simplified Chinese: 洛阳北郊机场
- Traditional Chinese: 洛陽北郊機場
Transcriptions
Standard Mandarin
- Hanyu Pinyin: Luòyáng Běijiāo Jīchǎng

Luoyang Beijiao Airport (IATA: LYA, ICAO: ZHLY) is an airport serving the city of Luoyang in Henan Province, China.

== History ==
On November 19, 1985, construction of Luoyang North Suburban Airport began. On September 26, 1987, Luoyang Beijiao Airport was officially opened. On August 1, 1992, Luoyang Beijiao Airport was opened to the public with the approval of the State Council of China. On April 9, 2010, the new terminal of Luoyang Beijiao Airport was opened. In 2009, The airport is located in 邙 (Mang) Mountain, at the junction of Luoyang Old Town and Mengjin District, Henan Province, China, 11 km southeast of Luoyang city center. Luoyang airport was the 4th busiest airport in China in terms of traffic movement. It is a 4D-class international regional airport and a China-class airport open to the outside world.

According to the official website of the airport in June 2021, Luoyang North Suburban Airport Terminal covers an area of 14,800 square meters and has three boarding bridges; civil aviation station Ping has nine aircraft spaces, including eight D-class aircraft and one C-class aircraft. The runway is 2500 meters long and 45 meters wide; it can meet the annual passenger throughput of 1.53 million passengers and 5000 tons of postal throughput. This is mainly because the airport houses an exercising terminal of Civil Aviation Flight University of China. In 2021, Luoyang Beijiao Airport completed a total of 1,237,795 passengers, an increase of 29.0% year-on-year, ranking 87th in China. Postal throughput of 928.9 tons, up 32.2% year-on-year, ranking 124th in China; aircraft take-off and landing 226,214 aircraft, up 25.5% year-on-year, ranking 11th in China's airports.

== Airlines and destinations ==
Airlines	Destinations
China Eastern Airlines	Kunming, Shanghai–Hongqiao
China Express Airlines	Baotou, Beihai, Chifeng, Guiyang, Hohhot
China Southern Airlines	Guangzhou, Shenzhen
GX Airlines	Dalian, Haikou, Nanning, Sanya, Zhuhai
Jiangxi Air	Harbin, Nanchang
LJ Air	Harbin, Huizhou
Lucky Air	Chengdu-Tianfu
Qingdao Airlines	Chongqing, Shenyang
Suparna Airlines	Hami, Shanghai–Pudong
Urumqi Air	Bangkok-Suvarnabhumi, Fuzhou, Ürümqi

== See also ==
- List of airports in China
- List of the busiest airports in China
