= Altay Xuedu Airport =

Altay Xuedu Airport 阿勒泰雪都机场 التاي اۋەجايى ئالتاي ئايرودرومى
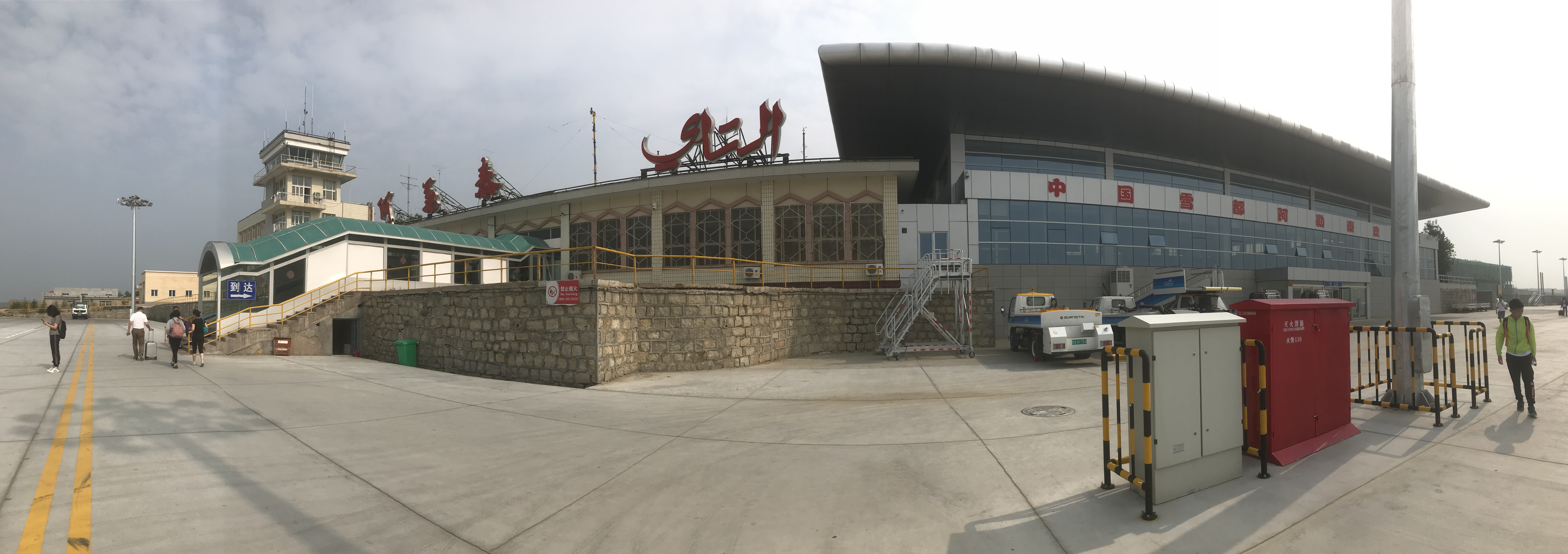
- IATA: AAT; ICAO: ZWAT

Summary
- Airport type: Public
- Serves: Altay, Xinjiang
- Elevation AMSL: 750 m (2,460 ft)
- Coordinates: 47°45′01.3″N 88°05′04.0″E

Map
- Location of airport in Xinjiang

Runways
Direction	Length		Surface
Direction	m	ft	Surface
12/30	2,200	7,218	Concrete

Statistics (2025)
- Passengers: 1,174,857
- Aircraft movements: 13,239
- Cargo (metric tons): 440.5

Altay Xuedu Airport
- Simplified Chinese: 阿勒泰雪都机场
- Traditional Chinese: 阿勒泰雪都機場
Transcriptions
Standard Mandarin
- Hanyu Pinyin: Ālètài Xuedu Jīchǎng

Aletai Xuedu Airport (IATA: AAT, ICAO: ZWAT) is an airport serving Altay City, Ili Kazakh Autonomous Prefecture, Xinjiang, China. It was formerly called "Altay Airport".

The airport is at an elevation of 2,460 feet (750 m) above mean sea level. It has one runway designated 11/29 which measures 2,800 by 45 metres (9,186 ft × 148 ft).

== History ==
Altay Airport was built in 1956 and opened to traffic in October of that year.

With the rapid development of tourism in the region, the airport underwent three renovations and expansions between 1985 and 2006. On April 20, 1985, Altai Airport underwent its first renovation and expansion, covering an area of 4,036.5 acres (269.1 hectares). The runway was replaced with an asphalt-rubber concrete pavement, 1,800 meters long and 40 meters wide. This renovation and expansion enabled the airport to meet the basic requirements for accepting small passenger aircraft.

The second expansion and renovation project of Altay Airport officially commenced on August 24, 1999, leading to the temporary suspension of all airline operations. The project lasted over a year and was completed on October 1, 2000, resuming operations. Key components of the project included runway upgrades, significantly optimizing the existing runway. The runway length was extended from 1800 meters to 2200 meters, and the width increased from 40 meters to 45 meters. The runway was also reinforced to accommodate greater takeoff weights. Following this expansion, Altay Airport was no longer limited to handling only small aircraft and began to be able to accommodate medium-sized regional jets such as the ATR-72.

On December 20, 2005, Altay Airport launched its third expansion and renovation project, suspending operations for construction. The project was estimated to cost 47.0055 million RMB. On July 16, the flight area renovation project was completed and passed inspection by the Xinjiang Civil Aviation Administration, officially commencing operation and meeting 4C-level flight area standards and Level 6 fire and rescue standards. The terminal expansion project, launched in October 2005, covers a total area of 2252.36 square meters, with an estimated investment of over 14 million RMB, and was scheduled to be operational by the end of 2006.

Between 2016 and 2019, Altay Airport underwent its fourth expansion and renovation project, the largest expansion to date. The project had a total investment of 523 million yuan and the works included extending the runway by 600 meters to 2,800 meters, building 3 new apron parking positions, expanding the terminal building by 7,550 square meters, and constructing other supporting facilities. The project was planned and constructed to meet the requirements of a 2025 passenger throughput of 800,000, an annual cargo and mail throughput of 1,600 tons, and an annual aircraft takeoffs and landings of 8,800. Some pilot construction begun in September 2016. Formal construction began on May 1, 2017, and was completed and passed test flight acceptance on September 14, 2019. From October 31 to November 1, 2019, the Civil Aviation Administration of Xinjiang, together with relevant units, conducted an industry acceptance inspection of the Altay Airport expansion and renovation project, confirming that the project has met the requirements for operation and use.

In August 2022, Altay Airport was officially renamed Altay Snow Capital Airport.

== Airlines and destinations ==
Airlines	Destinations
Air China	Beijing–Capital
Chengdu Airlines	Aksu, Aral, Bole, Kashgar, Shache, Tacheng, Turpan, Yining
China Eastern Airlines	Shanghai–Pudong, Xi'an
China Express Airlines	Aksu, Hami, Karamay, Kashgar, Shihezi, Yining
China Southern Airlines	Beijing–Daxing, Guangzhou, Ürümqi
Hainan Airlines	Beijing–Capital
Sichuan Airlines	Chengdu–Tianfu
Spring Airlines	Chengdu–Tianfu, Lanzhou
Tianjin Airlines	Chongqing, Ürümqi

== See also ==
- List of airports in China
