= Aksu Hongqipo Airport =

Airport in Xinjiang, China

Aksu Hongqipo Airport 阿克苏红旗坡机场 ئاقسۇ خوڭچىپو ئايرودرومى
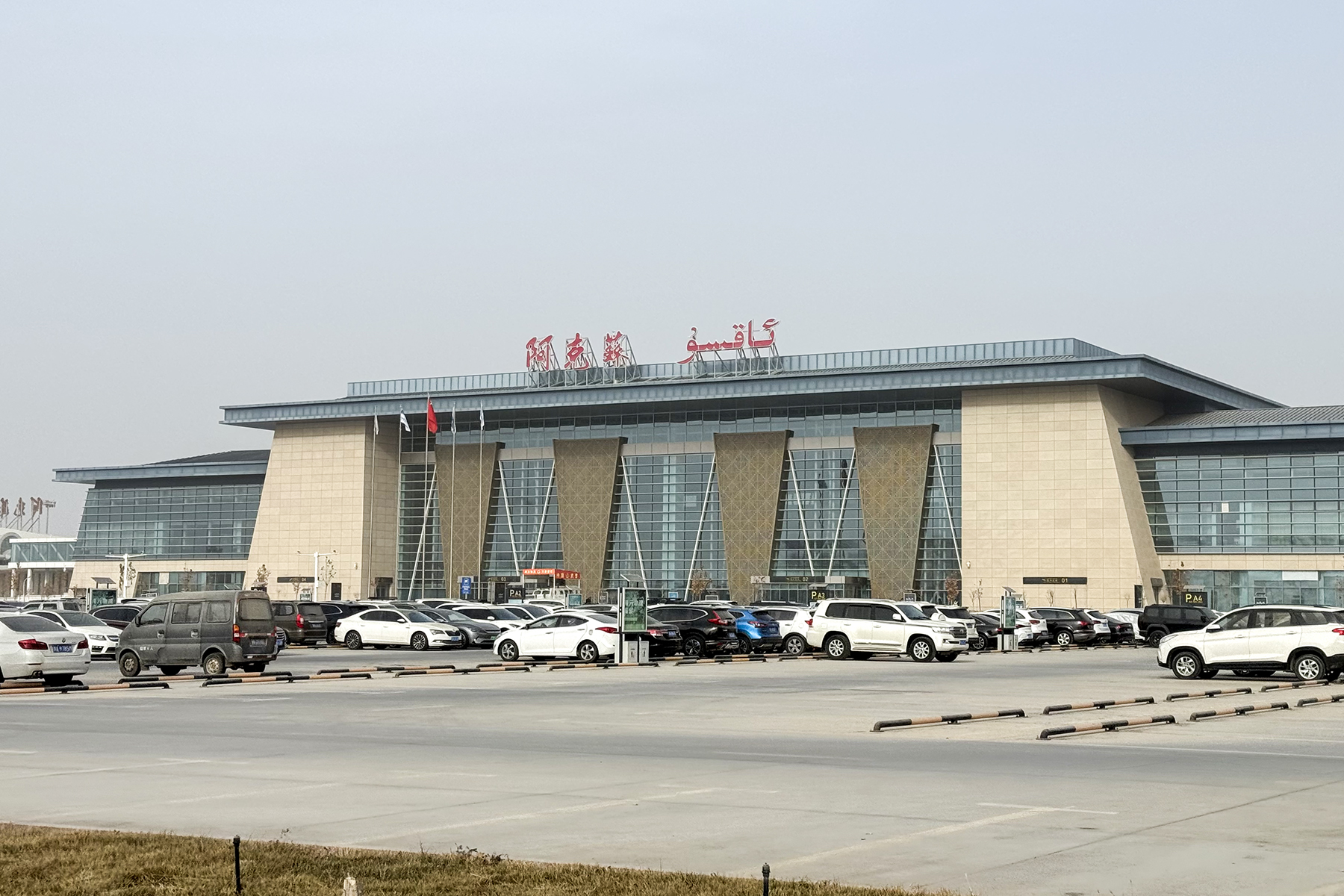
- IATA: AKU; ICAO: ZWAK

Summary
- Airport type: Public
- Serves: Aksu, Xinjiang
- Opened: 1973; 53 years ago
- Elevation AMSL: 3,816 ft (1,163 m)
- Coordinates: 41°15′45″N 80°17′30″E

Map
- Location of airport in Xinjiang

Runways
| Direction | Length | | Surface |
| Direction | m | ft | Surface |
|---|---|---|---|
| 09/27 | 2,400 | 7,874 | Asphalt |

Statistics (2025)
- Passengers: 2,778,946
- Aircraft movements: 25,462
- Cargo (metric tons): 11,306.3
- Source: CAAC

Aksu Hongqipo Airport
- Simplified Chinese: 阿克苏红旗坡机场
- Traditional Chinese: 阿克蘇紅旗坡機場
Transcriptions
Standard Mandarin
- Hanyu Pinyin: Ākèsū Hóngqípō Jīchǎng

Aksu Hongqipo Airport (IATA: AKU, ICAO: ZWAK) is an airport located in Onsu County, serving the city of Aksu and the namesake prefecture, in the autonomous region of Xinjiang, China. It was formerly called Aksu Airport.

== History ==
The history of Aksu Hongqipo Airport can be traced back to the time of the air force base. The airport was originally built in 1966 as an air force airport. In August 1972, the Aksu Civil Aviation Station was relocated here, and the airport officially became a joint military-civilian airport. Civilian aircraft were introduced in 1973, and it is now a joint military-civilian airport, owned by the Air Force.

The civilian section was named "Aksu Wensu Airport". In 1978, a renovation and expansion project was launched, and the new terminal building was completed and opened to the public in 1982, officially opening civil aviation services. The airport covered an area of 5,100 mu (approximately 340 hectares), with a 2,400-meter-long and 45-meter-wide runway. It had two parking stands for ATR-72 aircraft.

Due to the establishment of Xinjiang Airport (Group) Company in April 2004, Aksu Airport was divided into Aksu Airport of the Group Company and Aksu Air Traffic Control Station of the Air Traffic Management Bureau. It had only one route, Aksu-Urumqi-Aksu, then. In 2006, it handled 1,420 takeoffs and landings, 77,249 passengers, and 307 tons of cargo and mail.

In August 2008, the expansion and renovation project of Aksu Airport in Xinjiang commenced. This project, one of the key projects of Xinjiang Autonomous Region's "Eleventh Five-Year Plan," had a total investment of approximately 230 million yuan. The airport was planned and constructed to civil aviation 4C standards, with the runway extended to 2800 meters. A new terminal building, apron, and related supporting facilities were built, capable of accommodating Boeing 737-800 and smaller aircraft, with a designed annual passenger throughput of 440,000 and a cargo throughput of 5700 tons. The new terminal building had a designed floor area of approximately 5000 square meters, and the apron was 33,000 square meters, capable of accommodating large aircraft. In November 2010, the project successfully passed final acceptance, achieving acceptance for key projects such as air traffic control equipment installation and airfield engineering.

With the rapid economic development of Xinjiang, the air traffic volume of Aksu Airport has grown rapidly. In 2017, the airport handled 1.276 million passengers and 6,109 tons of cargo, far exceeding its designed capacity, and urgently needs a second expansion. On August 28, 2018, the airport expansion and renovation project was officially launched. As a key civil aviation project of the Inner Mongolia Autonomous Region during the 13th Five-Year Plan period and a key infrastructure construction project of Aksu Prefecture, this project has a design target year of 2025, with a projected annual passenger throughput of 3 million, annual cargo and mail throughput of 15,000 tons, and annual aircraft take-offs and landings of 29,400.

On November 26, 2020, the T2 terminal at Aksu Airport officially entered service, while the T1 terminal was temporarily closed for upgrades. On December 30 of the same year, T1 resumed operations and was designated exclusively for arrivals and departures of CRJ900 aircraft.

In August 2022, Aksu Wensu Airport (阿克苏温宿机场) was officially renamed Aksu Hongqipo Airport (阿克苏红旗坡机场).

On December 21, 2023, the Xinjiang Air Traffic Management Bureau Engineering Construction Command held a completion acceptance meeting for the civil engineering of the air traffic control work area of the second phase expansion and renovation project of Aksu Airport, and unanimously agreed to pass the completion acceptance of the civil engineering.

== Facilities ==
The airport resides at an elevation of 1,163 metres (3,816 ft) above mean sea level. It has one runway designated 09/27 which measures 2,400 by 45 metres (7,874 ft × 148 ft).

== Airlines and destinations ==
| Airlines | Destinations |
|---|---|
| Air China | Beijing–Capital, Chengdu–Tianfu, Lanzhou, Tumxuk, Ürümqi |
| Chengdu Airlines | Altay, Bole, Changsha, Chengdu–Shuangliu, Chengdu–Tianfu, Hami, Hotan, Kashgar, Qitai, Shihezi, Tacheng, Turpan, Yining |
| China Eastern Airlines | Xi'an |
| China Express Airlines | Altay, Aral, Bole, Chongqing, Hami, Hotan, Karamay, Kashgar, Korla, Qitai, Quzhou, Shache, Shihezi, Tumxuk, Yining, Zhaosu |
| China Southern Airlines | Hangzhou, Ürümqi |
| Chongqing Airlines | Chongqing |
| Fuzhou Airlines | Fuzhou, Zhengzhou |
| Loong Air | Hangzhou, Shanghai–Pudong, Wenzhou, Wuhan, Yinchuan, Zhengzhou |
| Shandong Airlines | Qingdao, Urumqi, Xi'an |
| Sichuan Airlines | Chengdu–Tianfu |
| Spring Airlines | Guangzhou, Lanzhou |
| Tianjin Airlines | Ürümqi |
| Urumqi Air | Zhengzhou, Taiyuan, Urumqi |
| West Air | Zhengzhou |

== See also ==
- List of airports in the People's Republic of China
