= Hotan Kungang Airport =

Airport in Xinjiang, China

Hotan Kungang Airport 和田昆冈机场 خوتەن ئايرودرومى
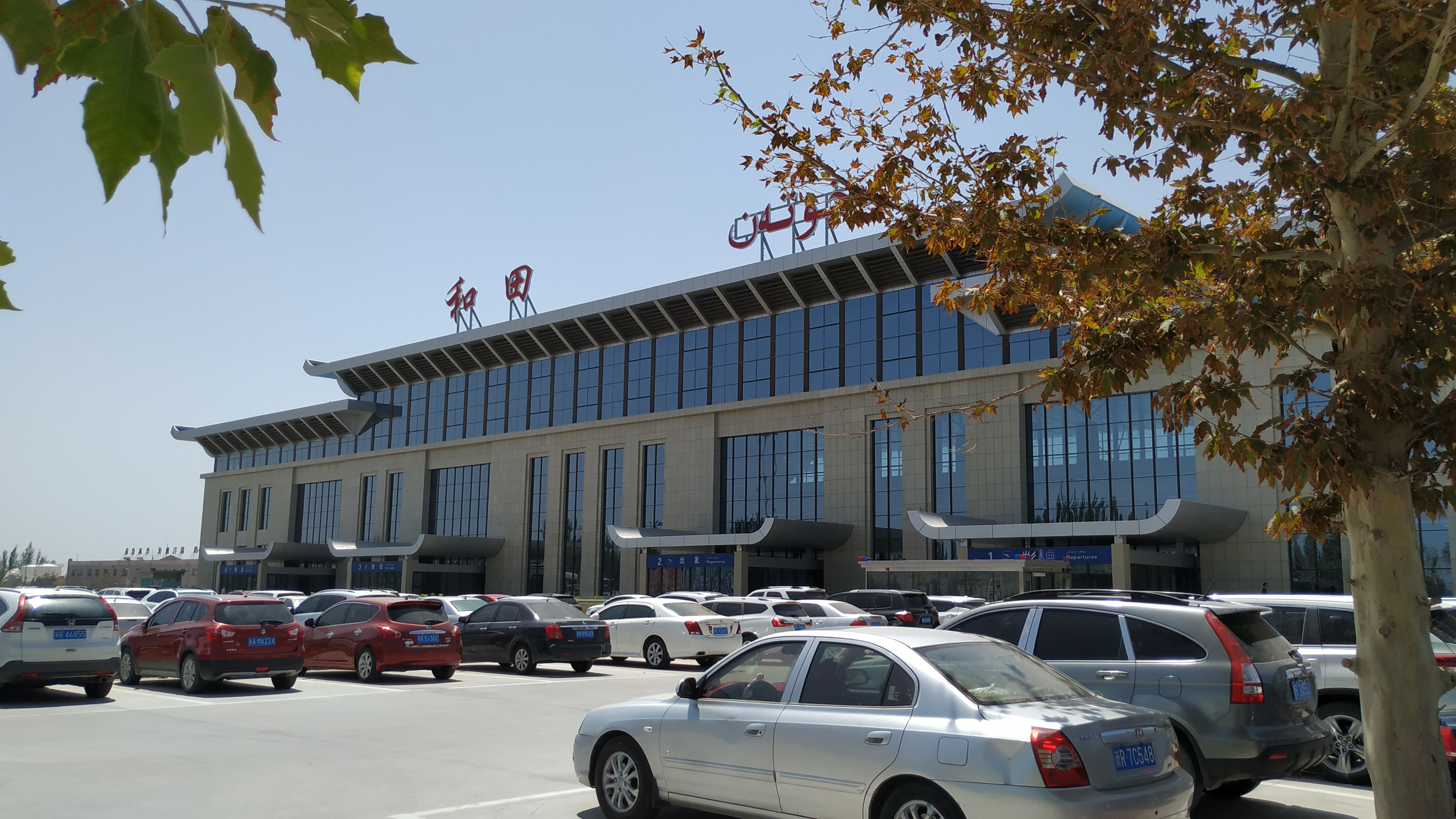
- IATA: HTN; ICAO: ZWTN

Summary
- Airport type: Public
- Operator: Xinjiang Airport Group
- Serves: Hotan, Hotan Prefecture, Xinjiang, China
- Opened: 1957; 69 years ago
- Elevation AMSL: 4,672 ft (1,424 m)
- Coordinates: 37°02′19″N 079°51′54″E

Map
- Location of airport in Xinjiang

Runways
Direction	Length		Surface
Direction	m	ft	Surface
11/29	3,200	10,499	Concrete

Statistics (2025)
- Passengers: 1,939,110
- Aircraft movements: 16,897
- Cargo (metric tons): 9,732.2
- Source: CAAC Sources

Hotan Kungang Airport
- Simplified Chinese: 和田昆冈机场
- Traditional Chinese: 和田昆岡機場
Transcriptions
Standard Mandarin
- Hanyu Pinyin: Hétián Kūngāng Jīchǎng

Hetian Kungang Airport (IATA: HTN, ICAO: ZWTN) is an airport serving Hotan, a city in the autonomous region of Xinjiang in China.

== History ==
Hotan Airport was initially built in 1931 (the 20th year of the Republic of China). It mainly existed as a simple dirt runway airport, lacking formal aviation facilities, and was primarily used for military or emergency needs. Due to its very early construction and the limited conditions at the time, the airport did not have a formal "proper name" for a long time and was only referred to by the place name.

Construction of Hotan Airport began in May 1956 and was completed and put into use in 1957. It was also an extremely rudimentary airport with an earthen runway, 1,800 meters long and 100 meters wide. Due to the limitations of the time, airports built in Xinjiang all had earthen runways, with the aim of ensuring early transportation needs.

In 1964, the Air Force expanded Hotan Airport, extending the runway to 2,800 meters to accommodate aircraft weighing less than 75.8 tons.

In 2002, the second phase of the expansion and renovation project of the airport commenced, with a total investment of 176 million yuan. The airport was classified as a 4D flight zone and designed to handle 81,900 passengers annually. The second phase of the expansion and renovation project was put into operation in 2004.

On March 25, 2014, the National Development and Reform Commission and the General Staff Department of the People's Liberation Army approved the feasibility study report for the expansion and renovation project of Hotan Airport. On May 19, 2014, the Civil Aviation Administration of Xinjiang approved the preliminary design and budget for the expansion and renovation project of Hotan Airport. The total investment for the expansion and renovation project of Hotan Airport is 485 million yuan, and the design capacity is based on a target year of 1.6 million passenger trips, 6,100 tons of cargo and mail throughput, and 13,300 aircraft takeoffs and landings by 2025. The project mainly includes: constructing a new civil aviation connecting taxiway, expanding the apron by 21,875 square meters, constructing a new terminal building of 17,493.4 square meters, a comprehensive business building of 2,553 square meters, renovating the existing terminal building of 565.65 square meters, a special vehicle garage of 1,093 square meters, and other production and living auxiliary facilities totaling 22,578.4 square meters.

In 2017, Hotan Airport's annual passenger throughput exceeded one million, becoming the fifth regional airport in Xinjiang to achieve this milestone. In 2019, the National Development and Reform Commission (NDRC) approved the feasibility study report for the Yutian regional airport, with a total estimated investment of 771 million yuan. Local matching funds were fully waived, significantly reducing the financial burden on local governments. Construction of the Yutian regional airport began on October 25th of that year, with plans to commence operations by the end of 2020.

On February 20, 2023, Hotan Airport was officially renamed "Hotan Kungang Airport". Kungang (昆冈) is derived from the phrase "jade comes from Kungang" (玉出昆冈) in the Thousand Character Classic (千字文).

On April 8, 2024, with the smooth landing of China Southern Airlines flight CZ695X on the south runway, Hotan Kungang Airport in Xinjiang officially entered the era of dual-runway operation, becoming the first airport in Xinjiang to use a dual-runway system. The newly added south runway is 3,800 meters long and 50 meters wide, located 1,310 meters from the north runway, and has a 4D flight zone rating, greatly enhancing the airport's comprehensive support capabilities. As Xinjiang's first dual-runway airport, this move elevates the airport's status as an aviation hub both within and outside Xinjiang.

== Facilities ==
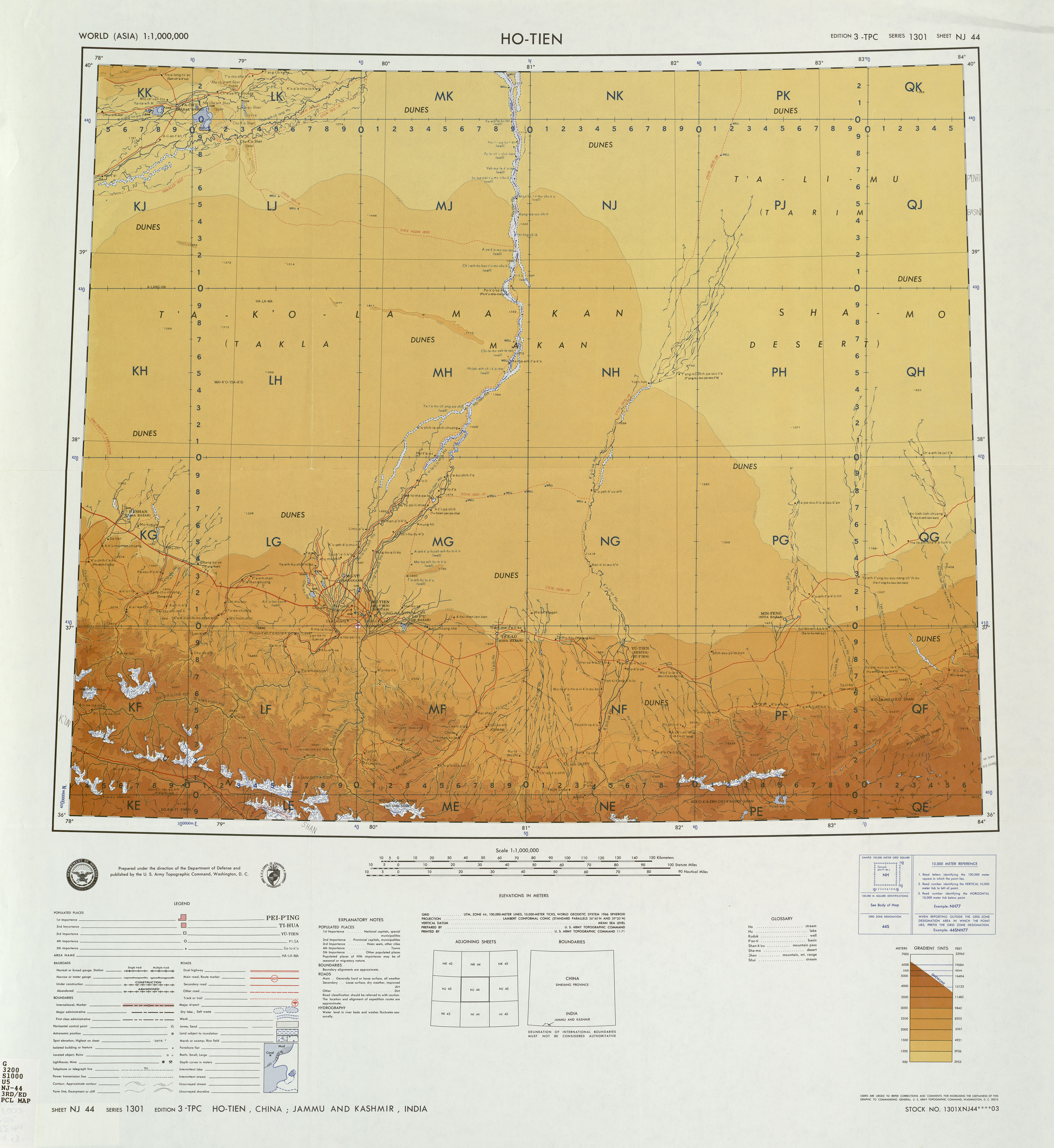
Map including Hotan Airport (labeled as HO-TIEN) and surrounding region (USATC, 1971)

The airport is at an elevation of 4,672 feet (1,424 m) above mean sea level. It has two runways designated 11/29N and 11/29S with a concrete surface measuring 3,200 by 50 metres (10,499 ft × 164 ft) and 3,800 by 50 metres (12,467 ft × 164 ft) respectively. The People's Liberation Army has aircraft stationed here and uses the facility to test its next generation fighters.

== Airlines and destinations ==
Airlines	Destinations
Air China	Beijing–Capital, Chengdu–Tianfu, Ürümqi
Chengdu Airlines	Aksu, Fuzhou, Hami, Kashgar, Ruoqiang, Shihezi, Tacheng, Turpan, Wuhan, Yining
China Eastern Airlines	Hefei, Xi'an
China Express Airlines	Aksu, Aral, Kashgar, Korla, Kuqa, Qiemo, Shache, Yining
China Southern Airlines	Chengdu–Tianfu, Kashgar, Korla, Tianjin, Ürümqi, Xi'an, Zhengzhou
Hainan Airlines	Guangzhou, Ürümqi
Qingdao Airlines	Changsha, Lanzhou
Shanghai Airlines	Ürümqi
Tianjin Airlines	Tianjin, Ürümqi
Urumqi Air	Lanzhou, Ürümqi, Zhengzhou
West Air	Chongqing

== See also ==
- List of airports in the People's Republic of China
