= Kuqa Qiuci Airport =

Airport in Xinjiang, China

Kuqa Qiuci Airport 库车龟兹机场 كۇچا ئايرودرومى
- IATA: KCA; ICAO: ZWKC

Summary
- Airport type: Public
- Serves: Kuqa, Xinjiang, China
- Opened: 7 September 2011; 14 years ago
- Elevation AMSL: 1,074 m / 3,524 ft
- Coordinates: 41°43′05″N 082°59′13″E

Map
- Location of airport in Xinjiang

Runways
Direction	Length		Surface
Direction	m	ft	Surface
08/26	2,600	8,530

Statistics (2025)
- Passengers: 912,911
- Aircraft movements: 12,544
- Cargo (metric tons): 625.1
- Source: CAAC

Kuqa Qiuci Airport
- Simplified Chinese: 库车龟兹机场
- Traditional Chinese: 庫車龜茲機場
Transcriptions
Standard Mandarin
- Hanyu Pinyin: Kùchē Qiūcí Jīchǎng

Kuqa Qiuci Airport (IATA: KCA, ICAO: ZWKC) is an airport serving Kuqa County in Xinjiang Autonomous Region, China. It is located 38 kilometers from the city. The airport was first built in 1939, but ceased operation in 1998. In 2009 it was moved and rebuilt at its current location with an investment of 333 million yuan, and was reopened in 2011 under the new name Kuqa Qiuci Airport, after the ancient kingdom based in Kuqa.

== History ==
Kuqa Airport was first built in 1939 and is one of the earliest airports built in Xinjiang. It ceased operations in September 1998. In June 2009, the relocation project of Kuqa New Airport was officially launched, with a total investment of 340 million yuan. The 2,600-meter runway could accommodate aircraft of 737-800 or smaller. The airport was designed to handle 230,000 passengers and 270 tons of cargo annually.

The airport passed final acceptance in July 2011 and was classified as a domestic 4C-level regional airport. It officially opened to traffic on September 7, 2011 and two daily flights operating between Tianjin and Kuqa, and between Kuqa and Urumqi were launched.

On November 7, 2012, the Civil Aviation Administration of China (CAAC) organized a navigation performance (RNP) flight procedure verification test flight at Kuqa Garche Airport for a Boeing 737-700 aircraft operated by China Southern Airlines. After a four-hour test flight, the aircraft landed to the airport, marking the airport passing the verification test flight. Through this procedure, equipment performance was verified, ensuring the normal operation of all equipment in the Instrument Landing System (ILS), DVOR/DME, and navigation lights, enabled the airport to have ILS functionality.

== Facilities ==
The airport is situated at an elevation of 1,074 metres (3,524 ft) above mean sea level. It has one runway which measures 2,600 metres (8,530 ft).

== Airlines and destinations ==
Airlines	Destinations
Air China	Chengdu–Tianfu
Chengdu Airlines	Karamay, Kashgar, Qiemo, Shache, Turpan, Yining
China Eastern Airlines	Ningbo, Shanghai–Hongqiao, Xi'an
China Express Airlines	Hami, Hotan, Karamay, Kashgar, Shache, Yining
China Southern Airlines	Ürümqi, Wuhan
China United Airlines	Beijing–Daxing, Ordos
Hainan Airlines	Ürümqi
Qingdao Airlines	Qingdao, Zhengzhou
Tianjin Airlines	Ürümqi

== See also ==
- List of airports in China
