= Karamay Guhai Airport =

Airport in Xinjiang, China

Karamay Guhai Airport 克拉玛依古海机场
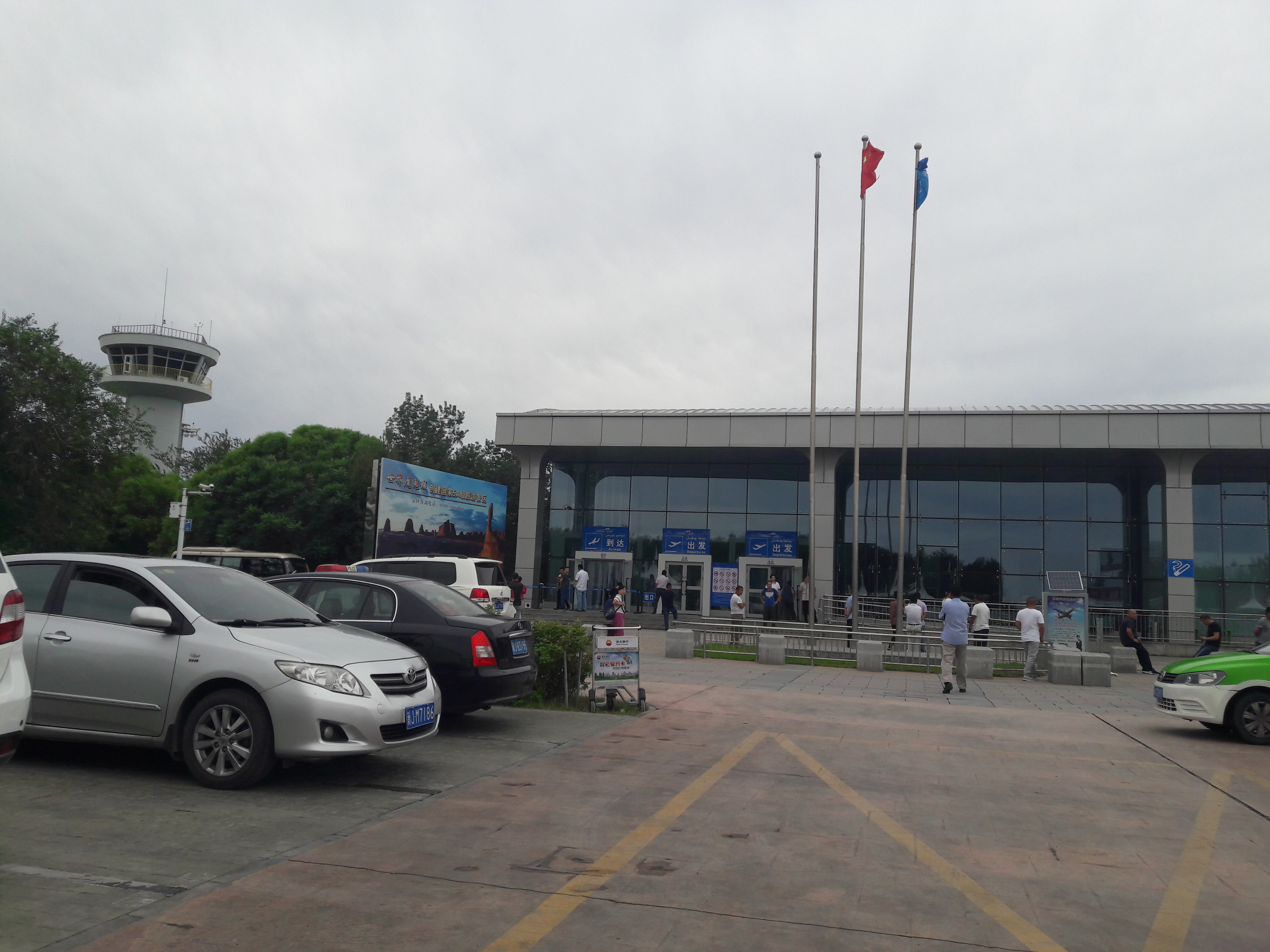
- IATA: KRY; ICAO: ZWKM

Summary
- Airport type: Public
- Serves: Karamay, Xinjiang, China
- Opened: 10 April 2006; 20 years ago
- Elevation AMSL: 1,096 ft (334 m)
- Coordinates: 45°27′59″N 084°57′09″E

Map
- Location of airport in Xinjiang

Runways
Direction	Length		Surface
Direction	m	ft	Surface
13/31	2,600	8,530	Asphalt/concrete

Statistics (2025)
- Passengers: 722,187
- Aircraft movements: 19,132
- Cargo (metric tons): 1,156.3

Karamay Guhai Airport
- Simplified Chinese: 克拉玛依古海机场
- Traditional Chinese: 克拉瑪依古海機場
Transcriptions
Standard Mandarin
- Hanyu Pinyin: Kèlāmǎyī Gǔhǎi Jīchǎng

Karamay Guhai Airport (IATA: KRY, ICAO: ZWKM) is an airport serving Karamay, a city in the autonomous region of Xinjiang in the People's Republic of China. It is a focus city for China Express Airlines and Joy Air.

== History ==
The history of Karamay Guhai Airport can be traced back to two airports with the same name—Karamay Airport.

Karamay Airport was built in 1958 and is located in the southeast of the city, 3.2 kilometers from the city center. At that time, the airport could only accommodate small passenger planes and ceased operation in 1988.

In August 2003, construction began on the new Karamay Airport, located approximately 17 kilometers south of the city center. Completed in October 2005, the newly built Karamay Airport is a 4D airport, covering an area of 2,600 meters long and 45 meters wide, with a total area of approximately 29,050 square meters. It can accommodate large and medium-sized passenger aircraft such as Boeing 757, 767, and A320. The relocated and renovated Karamay Airport is a branch airport in the Xinjiang Uygur Autonomous Region.

On April 10, 2006, Karamay Airport officially opened to traffic, with its first route being the Urumqi route operated by China Southern Airlines using a Boeing B757.

On November 1, 2021, the Civil Aviation Administration of China approved the naming of Karamay Airport as "Karamay Guhai Airport". In January 2022, the airport's official name was changed to "Karamay Guhai Airport".

On September 8, 2023, the new terminal building of Karamay Guhai Airport was put into use, and the old terminal building was suspended. The number of check-in counters increased to 7, and the number of waiting seats increased to 400, which could ensure the normal take-off and landing of 6 flights. The new terminal building could meet the needs of 2 million passengers per year.

On February 20, 2025, the first phase of the expansion and renovation project of Karamay Airport was launched. After the expansion and renovation, the runway will be 3,200 meters long and there will be 22 aircraft stands (22C). The terminal area will also be equipped with auxiliary buildings, air traffic control building, navigation lighting system, communication system, meteorological facilities and fire protection facilities.

== Facilities ==
The airport is at an elevation of 1,096 feet (334 m) above mean sea level. It has one runway designated 13/31 which measures 2,600 by 37.5 metres (8,530 ft × 123 ft).

== Airlines and destinations ==
Airlines	Destinations
Air China	Beijing–Capital, Chengdu–Tianfu, Yining
Chengdu Airlines	Kashgar, Kuqa, Turpan
China Eastern Airlines	Shanghai–Pudong, Xi'an
China Express Airlines	Aksu, Altay, Hami, Kashgar, Korla, Kuqa, Yining, Zhaosu
China Southern Airlines	Ürümqi
Loong Air	Hangzhou, Yinchuan, Zhengzhou
Sichuan Airlines	Chengdu–Tianfu
Spring Airlines	Lanzhou

== See also ==
- List of airports in the People's Republic of China
