= Korla Licheng Airport =

Airport in Xinjiang, China

Korla Licheng Airport 库尔勒梨城机场
- IATA: KRL; ICAO: ZWKL

Summary
- Airport type: Public
- Serves: Korla, Xinjiang, China
- Location: 2
- Opened: 2007; 19 years ago
- Elevation AMSL: 3,041 ft (927 m)
- Coordinates: 41°36′59″N 86°8′35″E

Map
- Location of airport in Xinjiang

Runways
Direction	Length		Surface
Direction	m	ft	Surface
04/22	2,780	9,121	Concrete

Statistics (2025)
- Passengers: 2,959,190
- Aircraft movements: 27,439
- Cargo (metric tons): 9,275.7
- Source: CAAC Sources

Korla Licheng Airport
- Simplified Chinese: 库尔勒梨城机场
- Traditional Chinese: 庫爾勒梨城機場
Transcriptions
Standard Mandarin
- Hanyu Pinyin: Kù'ěrlè Líchéng Jīchǎng

Ku'erle (Korla) Licheng Airport (IATA: KRL, ICAO: ZWKL) is an airport serving Korla, a city in the autonomous region of Xinjiang in the People's Republic of China. The airport is located on the Airport Expressway in Korla City, was initially built in 1967 as a military airport and opened to civil aviation operations in 1971. It is 17 kilometers from the city center and serves as a secondary aviation hub in Xinjiang. Until 2025, the airport will have two terminals with a total area of 25,925 square meters, 13 aircraft stands (5 of which are jet bridge stands), a 2,800-meter-long and 50-meter-wide runway, and can accommodate aircraft up to the B757-200 or similar. The airport serves 42 cities, covering seven major cities including Beijing and Chengdu. In recent years, with the rapid development of civil aviation, during peak seasons, a shortage of aircraft stands has led to long waiting times for landing aircraft on taxiways, causing flight delays and compromising flight punctuality. The airport is currently undergoing improvement projects.

== History ==
Korla Licheng Airport traces its origins to a military airfield constructed in 1967. The construction of the airport was completed in 1970 as a second‑class airfield of the PLA Air Force, with its station classified as Grade B. It began civil aviation service in 1971 and operated for decades as a joint military–civilian facility serving mainly regional routes to cities such as Urumqi and Kuqa. It currently hosts a fighter aviation regiment. In 1979, the airport began joint military–civil operations, establishing both a civil aviation station and a liaison station. Civil aviation mainly operated small aircraft such as the Il‑14 and the DHC‑6 Twin Otter, and successively opened scheduled routes from Korla to Urumqi, Kuqa, and Qiemo. Due to extremely rudimentary facilities and the fleet renewal of Xinjiang Airlines’ regional aircraft, civil flights were suspended in September 1998. In May 2003, civil aviation operations resumed, supporting ATR‑72 aircraft and a small number of Boeing 737 flights.

In April 2004, Xinjiang Airport Group was established, and Korla Airport was reorganized under the group. The old Korla Airport ceased operations on November 5, 2007, and the new airport officially entered service on December 20 of the same year. In its 2014 annual work report, Xinjiang Airport Group designated Korla Airport as a “secondary hub within Xinjiang,” marking the beginning of a period of rapid development. In July 2012, Korla and Qiemo airports were merged for joint operation, and in September 2017, Korla, Qiemo, and Ruoqiang airports were further consolidated under unified management.

The Korla Airport expansion and renovation project began on June 15, 2015. Designed to meet the projected 2025 targets of 2.6 million passengers, 13,000 tons of cargo and mail, and 28,600 aircraft movements, the project included the construction of a new 25,000‑square‑meter terminal building, seven additional aircraft stands, and five boarding bridges. In November 2017, the T2 terminal at Korla Airport was officially put into operation.

== Facilities ==
=== Terminals ===
The Korla Licheng Airport Terminal 1, which opened on December 20, 2007, has an area of 925 square meters. The renovation project of Terminal 1 at the airport was completed in 2025. This project was part of a plan to enhance air transport capacity. New escalators and elevators were installed in Terminal 1, and a waiting area was added on the second floor.

The T2 terminal of Korla Licheng Airport was put into use on November 11, 2017. It covers an area of 25,000 square meters.

=== Runways ===
The airport resides at an elevation of 3,041 feet (927 m) above mean sea level. It has one runway designated 04/22 which measures 2,780 by 45 metres (9,121 ft × 148 ft).

=== Future expansions ===
Despite the airport having undergone numerous renovations and expansions, in 2025, the airport had only 13 aircraft stands, including 5 jet bridge stands. During peak seasons, the scarcity of aircraft stands led to long wait times for landing aircraft on taxiways, causing flight delays and compromising on-time performance. This hindered the airport's healthy development and prevented passengers from enjoying a comfortable flight experience. On March 27, 2025, the ground-breaking ceremony for the apron expansion project of Korla Licheng Airport was held. This expansion project, with a total investment of 83.68 million yuan, will construct 8 new Category C aircraft stands on the east side of the existing apron, adding over 60,000 square meters of apron area. Simultaneously, an 840-square-meter modern special vehicle garage, patrol roads, navigation lights, and other supporting facilities will be built. Upon completion, the project will significantly alleviate the shortage of aircraft stands and further enhance the airport's comprehensive support capabilities.

== Airlines and destinations ==
Airlines	Destinations
Air China	Beijing–Capital, Chengdu–Tianfu, Hangzhou, Lanzhou, Wuhan
Air Guilin	Taiyuan
Beijing Capital Airlines	Chengdu–Tianfu, Hangzhou, Zhengzhou
China Eastern Airlines	Beijing–Daxing, Shanghai–Pudong
China Express Airlines	Aksu, Aral, Bole, Chongqing, Hami, Hotan, Karamay, Kashgar, Qiemo, Ruoqiang, Shache, Shihezi, Tacheng, Tumxuk, Yining, Yutian
China Southern Airlines	Beijing–Daxing, Chengdu–Tianfu, Hotan, Kashgar, Ürümqi, Yining
Chongqing Airlines	Chongqing
Hebei Airlines	Shijiazhuang
Jiangxi Air	Zhengzhou
Loong Air	Hangzhou, Xi'an, Zhengzhou
Lucky Air	Zhengzhou
Qingdao Airlines	Chengdu–Tianfu
Shandong Airlines	Jinan, Qingdao, Xi'an, Zhengzhou
Sichuan Airlines	Chengdu–Tianfu
Spring Airlines	Lanzhou
Tianjin Airlines	Ruoqiang, Ürümqi, Xi'an
West Air	Chongqing, Zhengzhou

== See also ==
- List of airports in the People's Republic of China
