= Bole Alashankou Airport =

Airport in Xinjiang, China

Bole Alashankou Airport 博乐阿拉山口机场
- IATA: BPL; ICAO: ZWBL

Summary
- Airport type: Public
- Serves: Bole/Alashankou/Shuanghe, Xinjiang, China
- Opened: 10 July 2010; 15 years ago
- Elevation AMSL: 382 m (1,253 ft)
- Coordinates: 44°53′42″N 82°17′59″E

Map
- Location of airport in Xinjiang

Runways
Direction	Length		Surface
Direction	m	ft	Surface
10/28	2,600	8,530

Statistics (2025)
- Passengers: 568,887
- Aircraft movements: 55,114
- Cargo (metric tons): 428.1

Bole Alashankou Airport
- Simplified Chinese: 博乐阿拉山口机场
- Traditional Chinese: 博樂阿拉山口機場
Transcriptions
Standard Mandarin
- Hanyu Pinyin: Bólè Ālāshānkǒu Jīchǎng

Bole Alashankou Airport (IATA: BPL, ICAO: ZWBL) is an airport serving the cities of Bole and Alashankou in Bortala Mongol Autonomous Prefecture and Shuanghe in Xinjiang Uygur Autonomous Region, China. It is located 18 kilometers east of Bole, 50 kilometers south of the Alashankou border crossing with Kazakhstan, and 10 kilometers north of Shuanghe. Construction started in July 2009 with an investment of 320 million yuan, and the airport was opened on 10 July 2010.

== History ==
Bole Alashankou Airport is a civil airport located 18 kilometers east of Bole City and 57 kilometers from Alashankou. The airport covers an area of 2,550 mu (approximately 163 hectares). Construction began on July 21, 2009, with an estimated investment of 326.13 million yuan. It was completed and passed final acceptance in June 2010. The test flight was successful on July 2 and opened to traffic on July 10, 2010.

== Airlines and destinations ==
Airlines	Destinations
Chengdu Airlines	Aksu, Altay, Kashgar, Shache, Turpan, Yining
China Express Airlines	Aksu, Aral, Kashgar, Korla, Tacheng
China Southern Airlines	Ürümqi, Wuhan
Sichuan Airlines	Chengdu–Tianfu
Tianjin Airlines	Ürümqi
Urumqi Air	Lanzhou, Zhengzhou

== See also ==
- List of airports in China
- List of the busiest airports in China
