= Shache Yarkant Airport =

Shache Yarkant Airport 莎车叶尔羌机场
- IATA: QSZ; ICAO: ZWSC

Summary
- Airport type: Public
- Serves: Yarkant (Shache), Xinjiang, China
- Location: Zirefuxiati
- Opened: 1 August 2017
- Elevation AMSL: 1,290 m (4,230 ft)
- Coordinates: 38.245°N 77.060°E

Map
- Location of airport in Xinjiang

Runways
Direction	Length		Surface
Direction	m	ft	Surface
15/33	3,000	9,843

Statistics (2025)
- Passengers: 521,746
- Aircraft movements: 7,790
- Cargo (metric tons): 1,023.6

Shache Yarkant Airport

Chinese name
- Simplified Chinese: 莎车叶尔羌机场
- Traditional Chinese: 莎車葉爾羌機場
Transcriptions
Standard Mandarin
- Hanyu Pinyin: Shāchē Yè'ěrqiāng Jīchǎng

Uyghur name
- Uyghur: يەكەن ئايرودرومى

Shache Ye'erqiang Airport (IATA: QSZ, ICAO: ZWSC) is an airport that serves Yarkant County (Shache) in Kashgar Prefecture of Xinjiang Uyghur Autonomous Region in northwestern China. It is located near Zerepshat/Zirefuxiati Village (زەرەپشات تاجىك يېزىسى, 孜热甫夏提). The airport received approval from the State Council of China and the Central Military Commission in January 2014. The estimated cost of construction was 541 million yuan. Shache Airport opened on 1 August 2017 as the 19th airport in Xinjiang.

== History ==
The site selection for the Shache Ye'erqiang Airport project began in November 2010.

The State Council and the Central Military Commission approved the project on January 10, 2014. The National Development and Reform Commission approved the project on May 5, 2015. This phase of the project was designed to meet the target of 200,000 passenger trips and 830 tons of cargo throughput by 2020, with a flight zone rating of 4C. The main construction contents included a 3,000-meter-long runway, a 3,000-square-meter terminal building, four parking spaces on the apron, and supporting facilities.

Construction of the airport began in November 2015 and was completed in May 2017. Shache Ye'erqiang Airport officially opened to traffic on August 1, 2017.

== Facilities ==
Carnoc reported in 2014 that the airport would have a 3,000-meter runway (class 4C), a 3,000-square-meter terminal building with 3 aerobridges, and four aircraft parking places. It is projected to handle 200,000 passengers and 830 tons of cargo annually by 2020.

== Airlines and destinations ==
Airlines	Destinations
Chengdu Airlines	Altay, Bole, Chengdu–Tianfu, Kuqa, Lanzhou, Turpan, Yining,
China Eastern Airlines	Xi'an
China Express Airlines	Aksu, Hami, Hotan, Kashgar, Korla, Kuqa, Tumxuk, Yining
China Southern Airlines	Ürümqi
Spring Airlines	Shanghai-Pudong
Tibet Airlines	Ngari–Gunsa, Xining

== See also ==
- List of airports in China
- List of the busiest airports in China
