= Fuyun Koktokay Airport =

Fuyun Koktokay Airport 富蕴可可托海机场 كوكتوقاي ئايروپورتى كوكتوعاي اۋەجاي
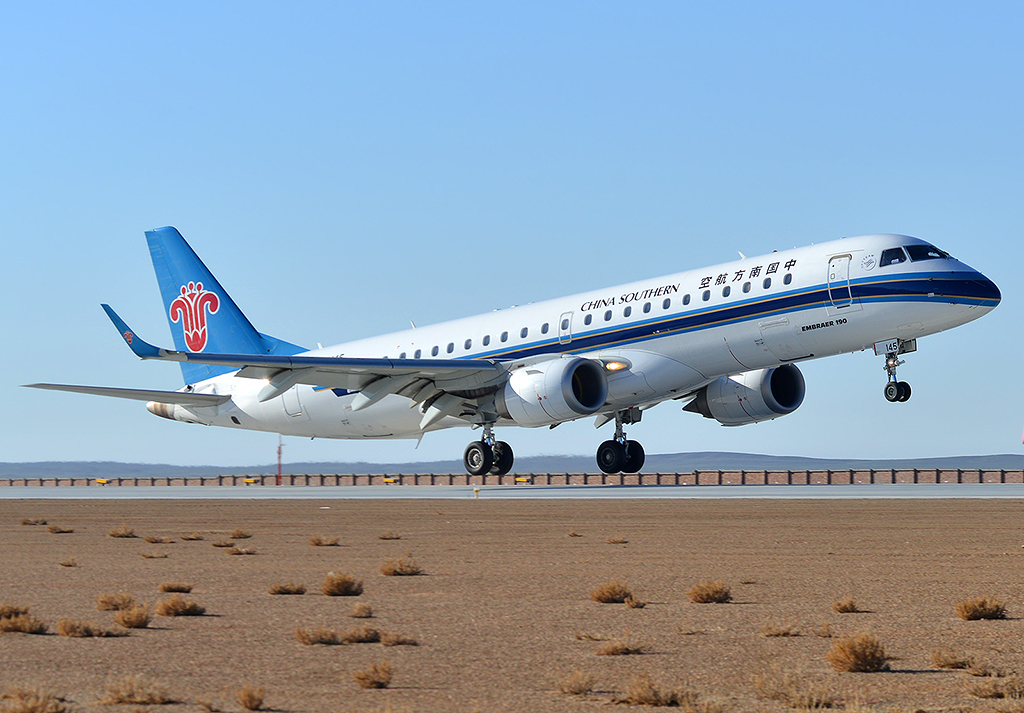
- China Southern Airlines Embraer 190 (B-3145) at Fuyun Koktokay Airport (April 2016)
- IATA: FYN; ICAO: ZWFY

Summary
- Airport type: Public
- Location: Fuyun, Xinjiang, China
- Opened: 1 August 2015
- Coordinates: 46°48′04″N 89°32′18″E

Map
- Location of airport in Xinjiang

Runways
Direction	Length		Surface
Direction	m	ft	Surface
12/30	2,600	8,530

Statistics (2021)
- Passengers: 40,928
- Aircraft movements: 27,598
- Cargo (metric tons): 12.1

Fuyun Koktokay Airport
- Simplified Chinese: 富蕴可可托海机场
- Traditional Chinese: 富蘊可可託海機場
Transcriptions
Standard Mandarin
- Hanyu Pinyin: Fùyùn Kěkětuōhǎi Jīchǎng

Fuyun Keketuohai (Koktokay) Airport (IATA: FYN, ICAO: ZWFY) is an airport serving Fuyun County in Altay Prefecture, Xinjiang, China.

The old airport of Fuyun was built in 1965, located 38 kilometres (24 mi) from the county seat. It served a single route to Ürümqi until it was canceled in 1994, after the closing of the Koktokay mine.

In November 2011, the State Council of China approved the proposal to move and rebuild Fuyun Airport. The new airport is located near the intersection of the provincial highway 226 and the national highway 216, 21 kilometres (13 mi) from the county seat. It is a class 4C regional airport, and the airport was projected to cost 410 million yuan to build. The airport was opened on 1 August 2015, when the inaugural China Southern Airlines flight from Urumqi Diwopu International Airport landed at the airport.

== Airlines and destinations ==
Airlines	Destinations
Chengdu Airlines	Chengdu–Tianfu, Lanzhou, Turpan, Yining
China Southern Airlines	Urumqi
Tianjin Airlines	Urumqi

== See also ==
- List of airports in China
- List of the busiest airports in China
