= Ürümqi Tianshan International Airport =

Airport serving Ürümqi, Xinjiang, China

Ürümqi Tianshan International Airport 乌鲁木齐天山国际机场 ئۈرۈمچى تىيانشان خەلقئارا ئايروپورتى
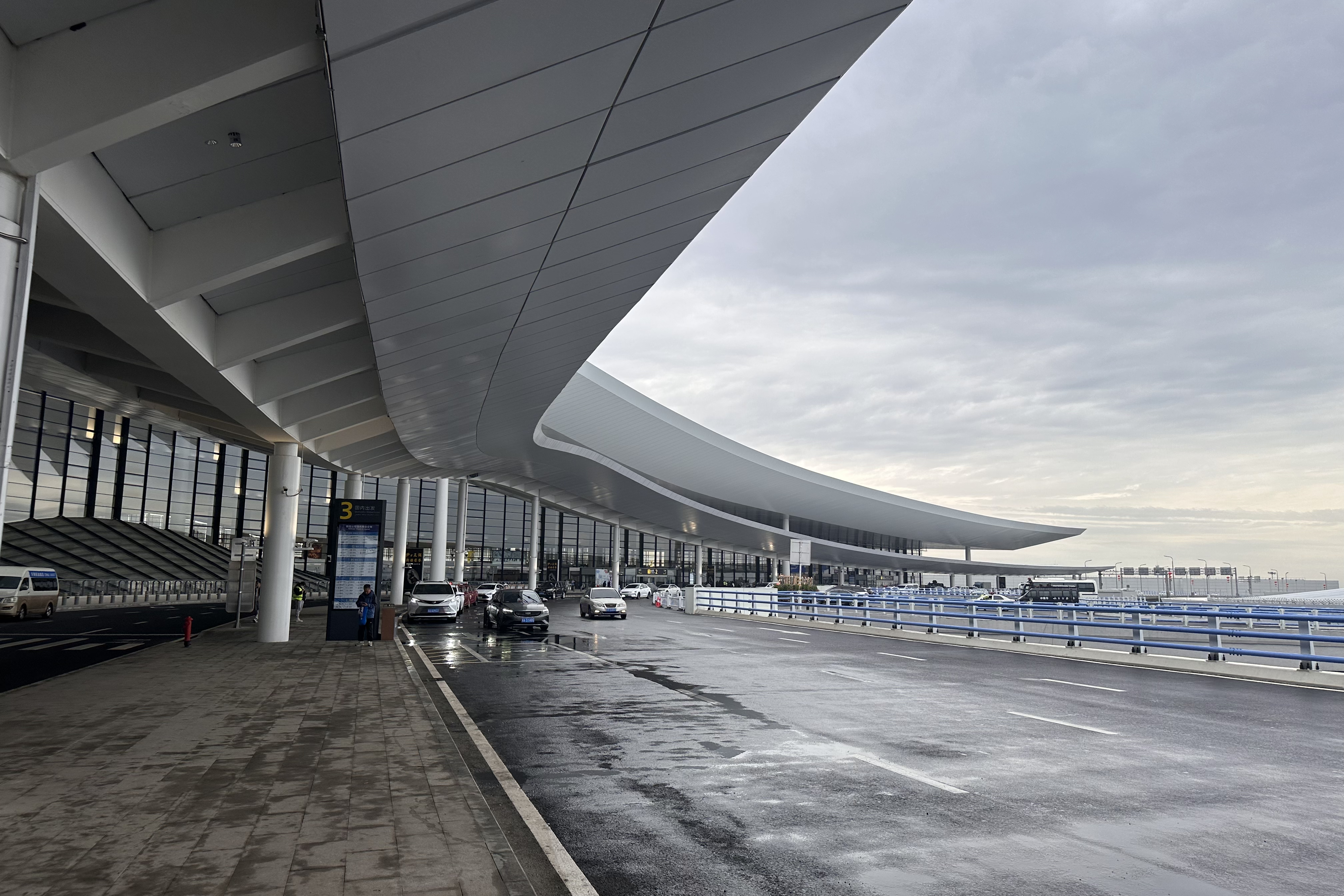
- View of Terminal 4 in 2025
- IATA: URC; ICAO: ZWWW

Summary
- Airport type: Public
- Operator: Xinjiang Airport Group Co. Ltd.
- Serves: Ürümqi
- Location: Diwopu, Xinshi, Ürümqi, Xinjiang, China
- Opened: 1973; 53 years ago
- Hub for: China Southern Airlines; Urumqi Air
- Focus city for: Hainan Airlines
- Elevation AMSL: 648 m (2,126 ft)
- Coordinates: 43°54′26″N 87°28′27″E
- Website: www.xjairport.com

Maps
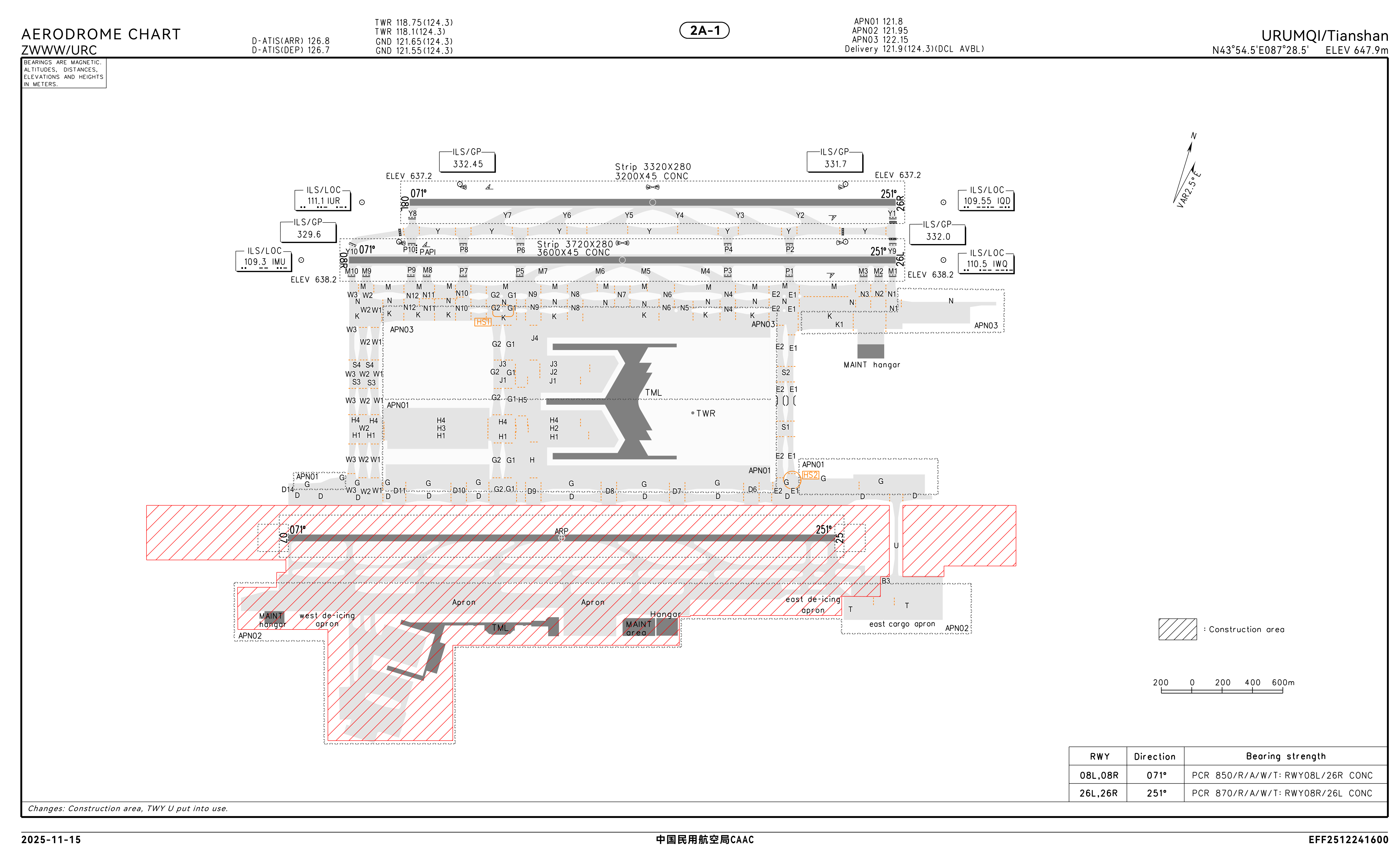
- CAAC airport chart

- Location in Xinjiang Location in China

Runways
Direction	Length		Surface
Direction	m	ft	Surface
07/25	3,600	11,811	Concrete
08R/26L	3,600	11,811	Concrete
08L/26R	3,200	10,499	Concrete

Statistics (2025)
- Passengers: 29,179,737 ▲5.1%
- Aircraft movements: 194,910 ▲3.3%
- Cargo (Metric tonnes): 331,789.7 ▲40.6%
- Source: DAFIF Source: List of the busiest airports in China

Ürümqi Tianshan International Airport

Chinese name
- Simplified Chinese: 乌鲁木齐天山国际机场
- Traditional Chinese: 烏魯木齊天山國際機場
Transcriptions
Standard Mandarin
- Hanyu Pinyin: Wūlǔmùqí Tiānshān Guójìjīchǎng
- Wade–Giles: U-lu-mu-chi Ti-wo-pʻu Kuo-chi-chi-chʻang
other Mandarin
- Xiao'erjing: ءُلُمُٿِ دِوَعپُ قُوَعکِ كِچْا

Uyghur name
- Uyghur: ئۈرۈمچى تىيانشان خەلقئارا ئايروپورتى
Transcriptions
- Latin Yëziqi: Ürümchi Tianshan Xelqara Ayroporti
- Yengi Yeziⱪ: Ürümqi Tianshan Həlⱪ’ara Ayroporti
- Siril Yëziqi: Үрүмчи Тяншан хәлқара айропорти

Ürümqi Tianshan International Airport (IATA: URC, ICAO: ZWWW) is an international airport serving Ürümqi, the capital of Northwest China's Xinjiang Uygur Autonomous Region. It is located in the Diwopu township of Xinshi district, 16 km (9.9 mi) northwest of downtown Ürümqi. As a hub for China Southern Airlines and as a focus city for Hainan Airlines, the airport handled 29,179,737 passengers in 2025, making it the 18th busiest airport in China by passenger traffic.. Among all five autonomous region in China, Ürümqi Tianshan International Airport is the only airport is classified 4F-class.

== History ==
Ürümqi Airport was opened to foreign passengers in 1973, and has been used for emergency landings for flights between Europe and west Asia. It was renamed from Ürümqi Diwopu International Airport to Ürümqi Tianshan International Airport in March 2025.

== Facilities ==
The airport covers an area of 484 hectares (1,200 acres). Its newly built runway is 3,600 m (11,800 ft) in length. The airport can allow the landing of large aircraft such as the Boeing 747. The 110,000 m^{2} (1,200,000 sq ft) apron can accommodate over 30 aircraft.

=== Runways ===
- The first runway (07/25) was built in 1994 to accept the expansion, the flight zone level 4E, runway length 3,600 meters (11,811 ft), 45 meters (148 ft) wide, PCN value of 74, elevation 648 meters, with Class II precision approach.
- The second runway (08R/26L): located to the north of the first runway, flight zone level 4F, runway length 3,600 meters (11,811 ft), 60 meters (197 ft) wide.
- The third runway (08L/26R): located to the north of the first runway, flight zone level 4F, runway 3,200 meters (10,499 ft) long, 60 meters (197 ft) wide.

=== Terminals ===
==== Terminal 1 (closed) ====
The original terminal opened in 1974. It was closed between 23 April 2011 and 30 August 2013 for renovation. On 1 April 2014, operations were resumed. After the transformation of the T1 terminal has six security channels, 19 check-in counters, with the peak hourly 700 times the business capacity. This terminal is mainly for regional aviation around Xinjiang province and low-cost aviation use, including Tianjin Airlines, Capital Aviation, Spring Airlines, Yunnan Xiangpeng Airlines, China United Airlines, Okay Airways, and Western Airlines.

==== Terminal 2 (closed) ====
Construction on this terminal started in April 1994, was completed in December 2001 through the national acceptance, and on 12 May 2002, the terminal opened. On 10 July 2010, it closed for a renovation project, and resumed operations on 16 April 2011. It serves most domestic routes outside of Xinjiang province, except for China Southern, Xiamen and Chongqing Airlines flights.

Terminal 2 gallery
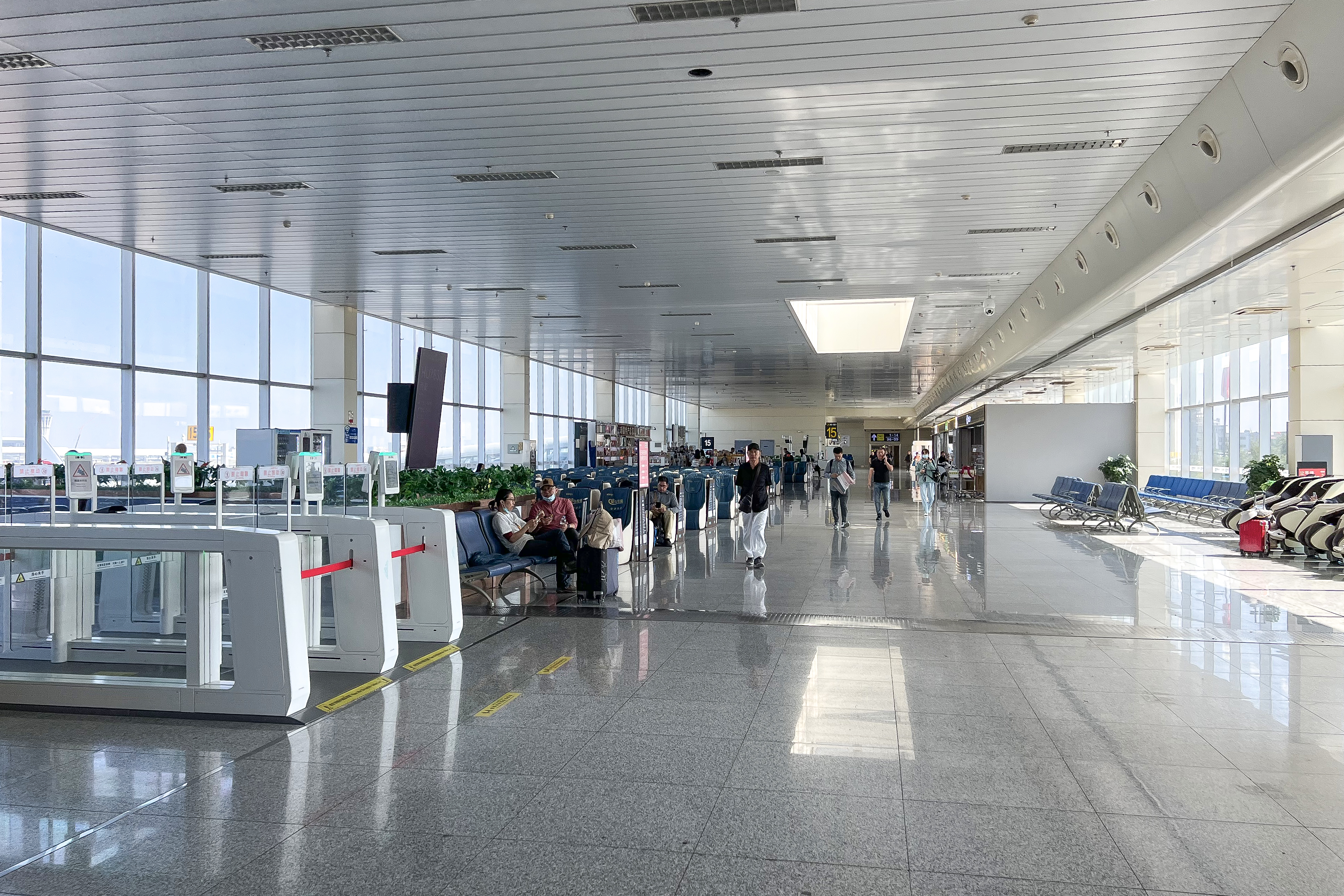
Waiting hall

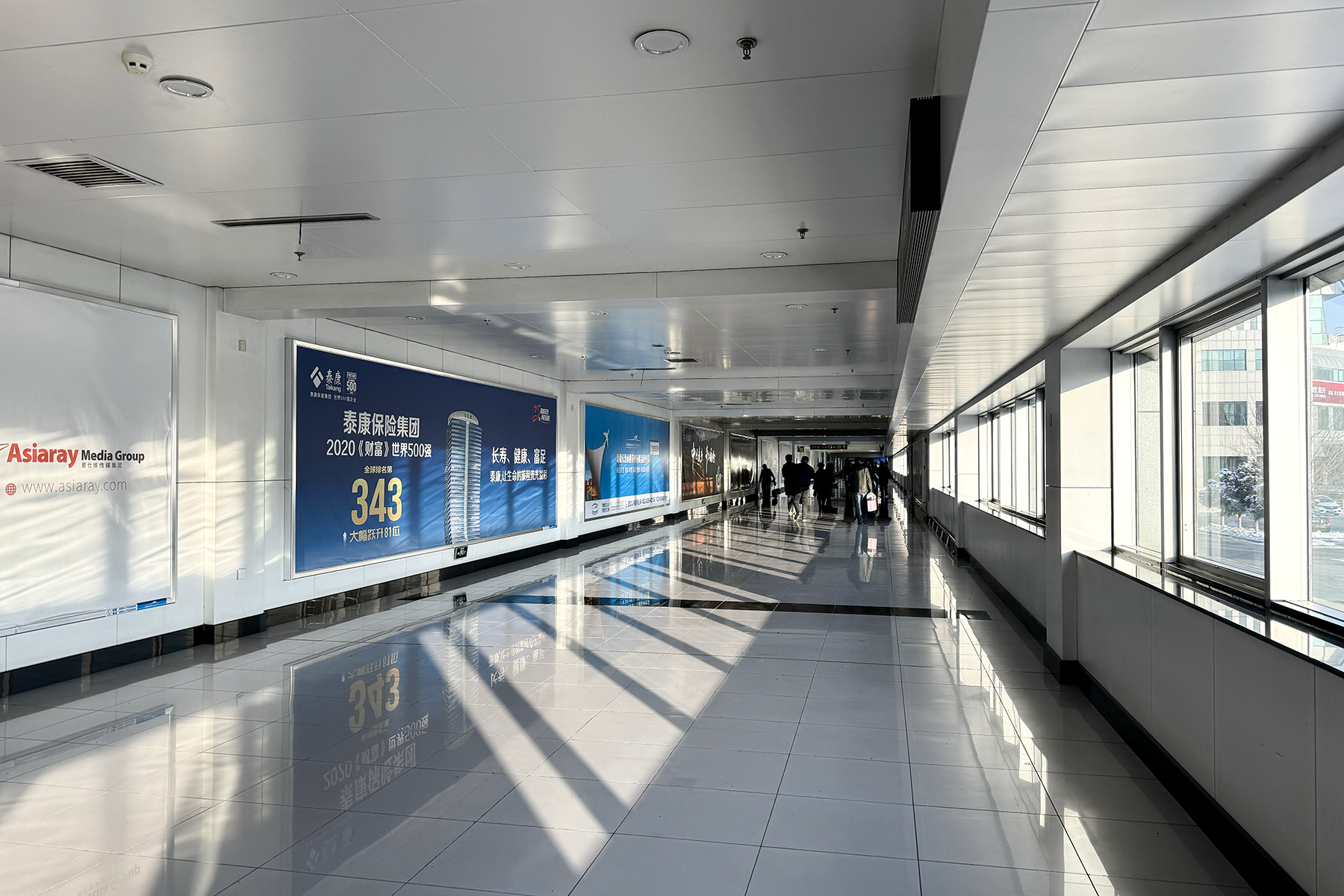
Arrival tunnel

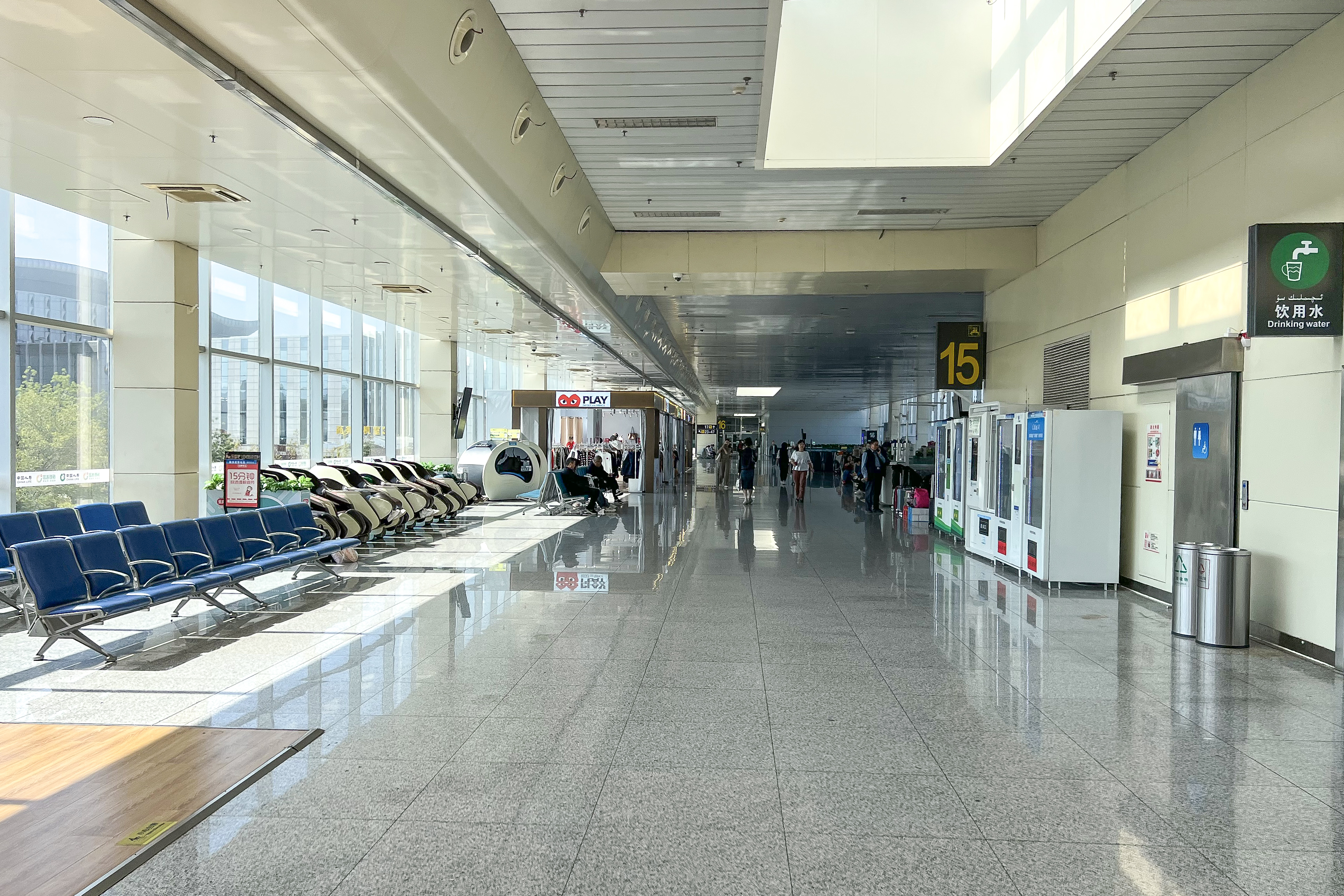
Waiting hall towards Terminal 3

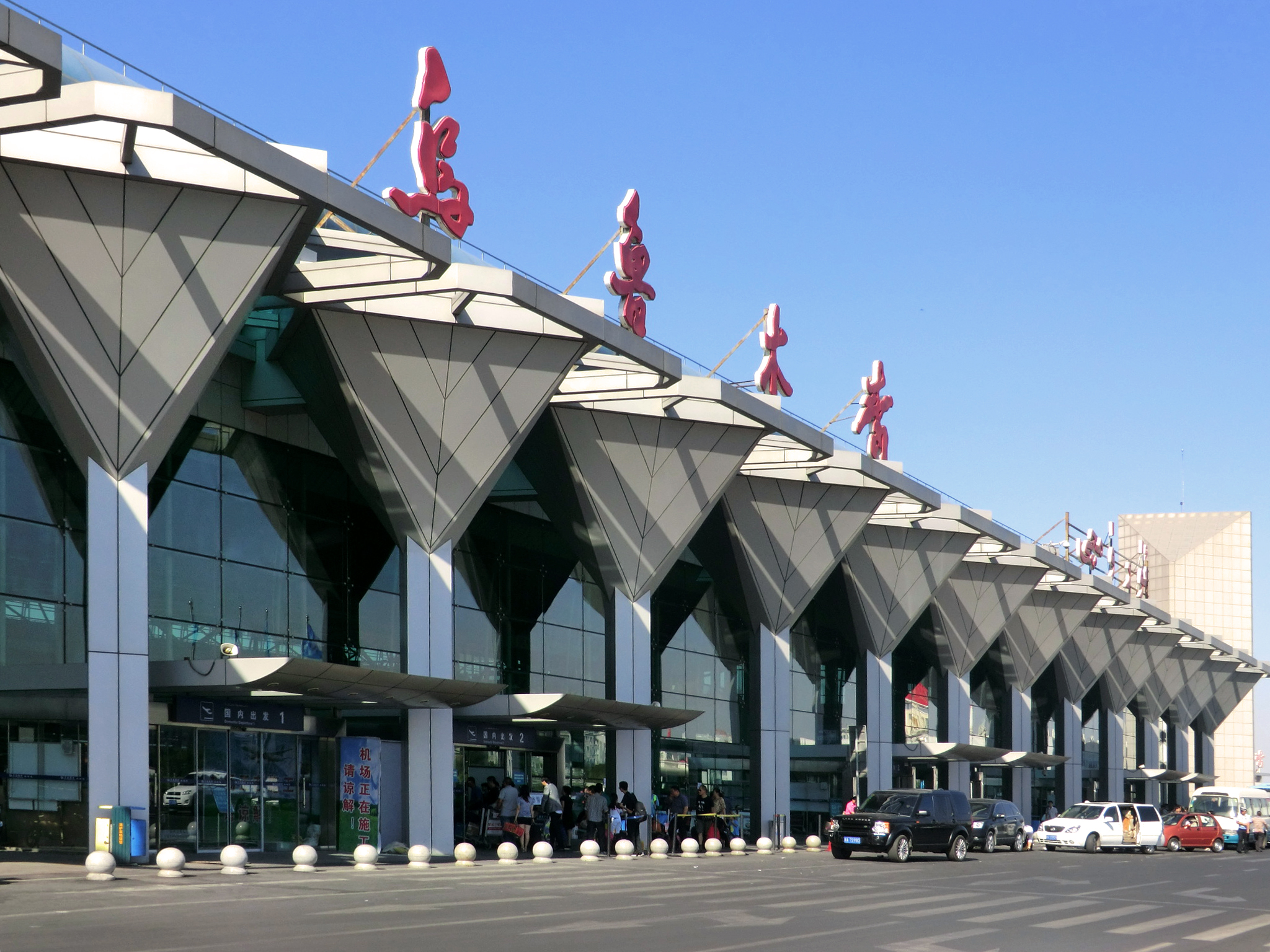
Terminal 2 exterior

==== Terminal 3 (closed) ====
Construction of Terminal 3 to the west of the older terminal building began in April 2007 at a cost of 2.8 billion yuan (350 million U.S. dollars). It increased Diwopu's ability to handle more than three times its 2007 capacity of 5.13 million passengers annually to 16.35 million passengers annually. It can also handle 275,000 tons of cargo and 155,000 aircraft a year. Terminal 3 added 22 more jet bridges and nearly 106,000 square meters of new terminal space. The terminal opened in 2009.

Terminal 3 gallery
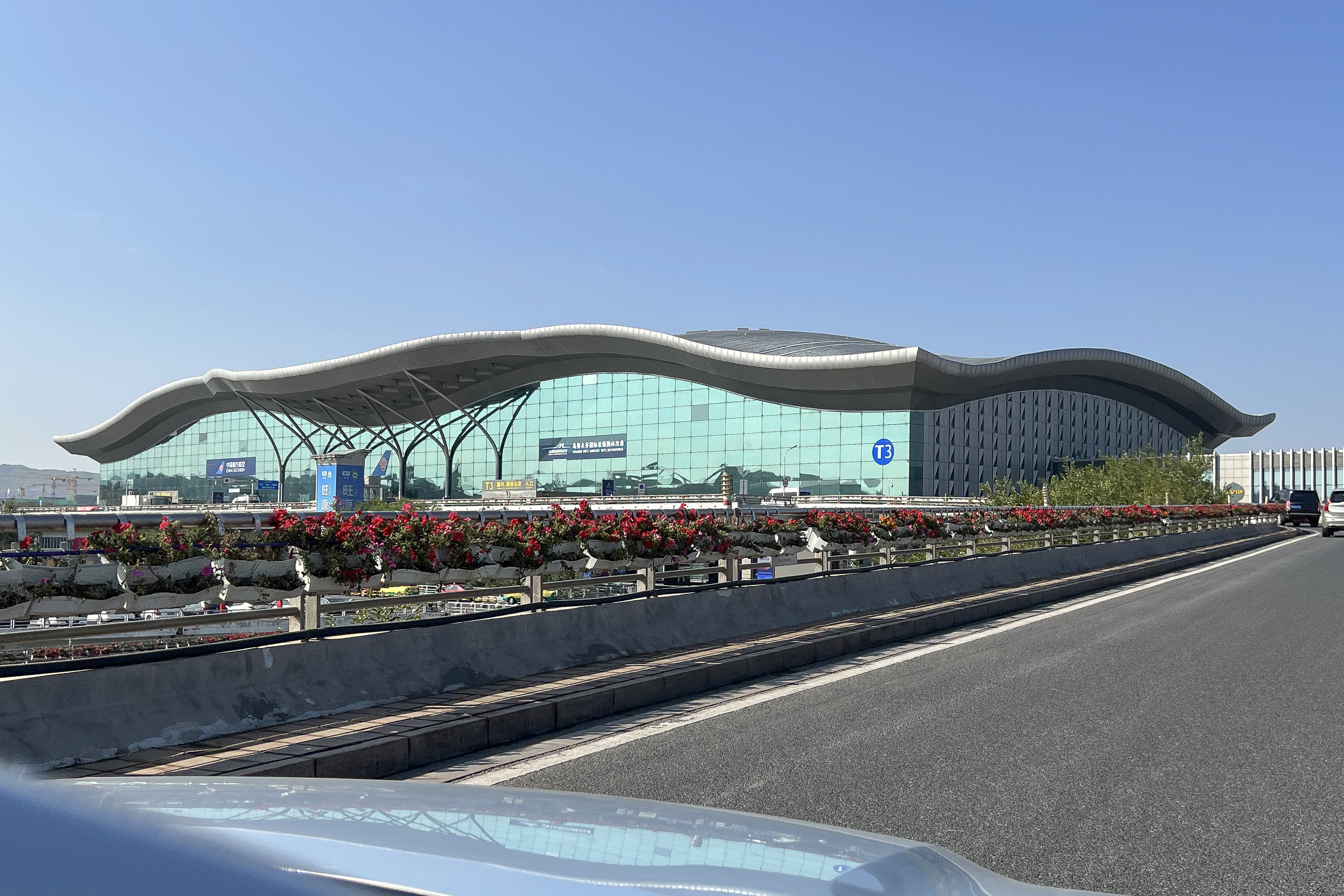
Terminal 3 exterior

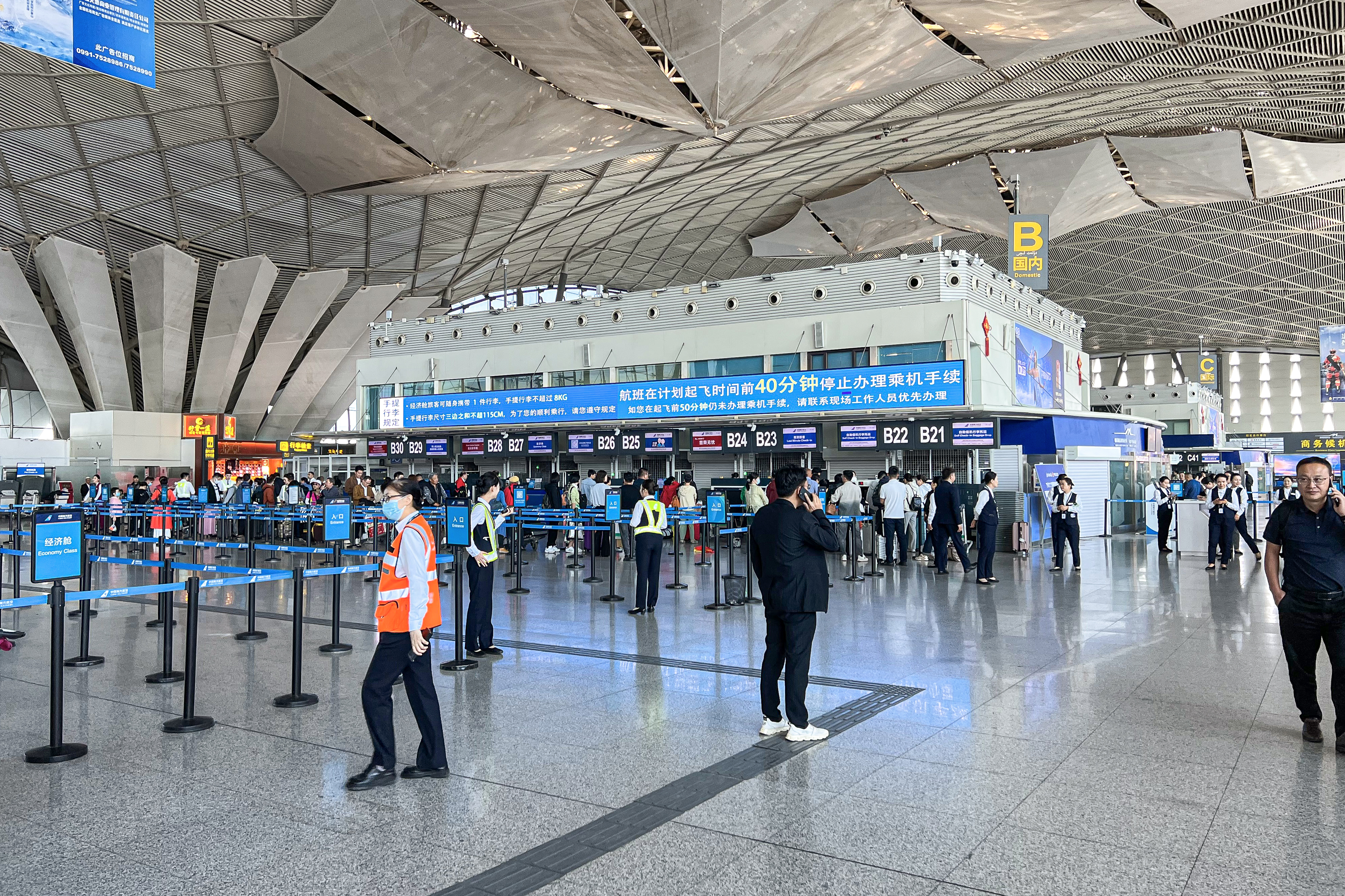
Check-in zone B

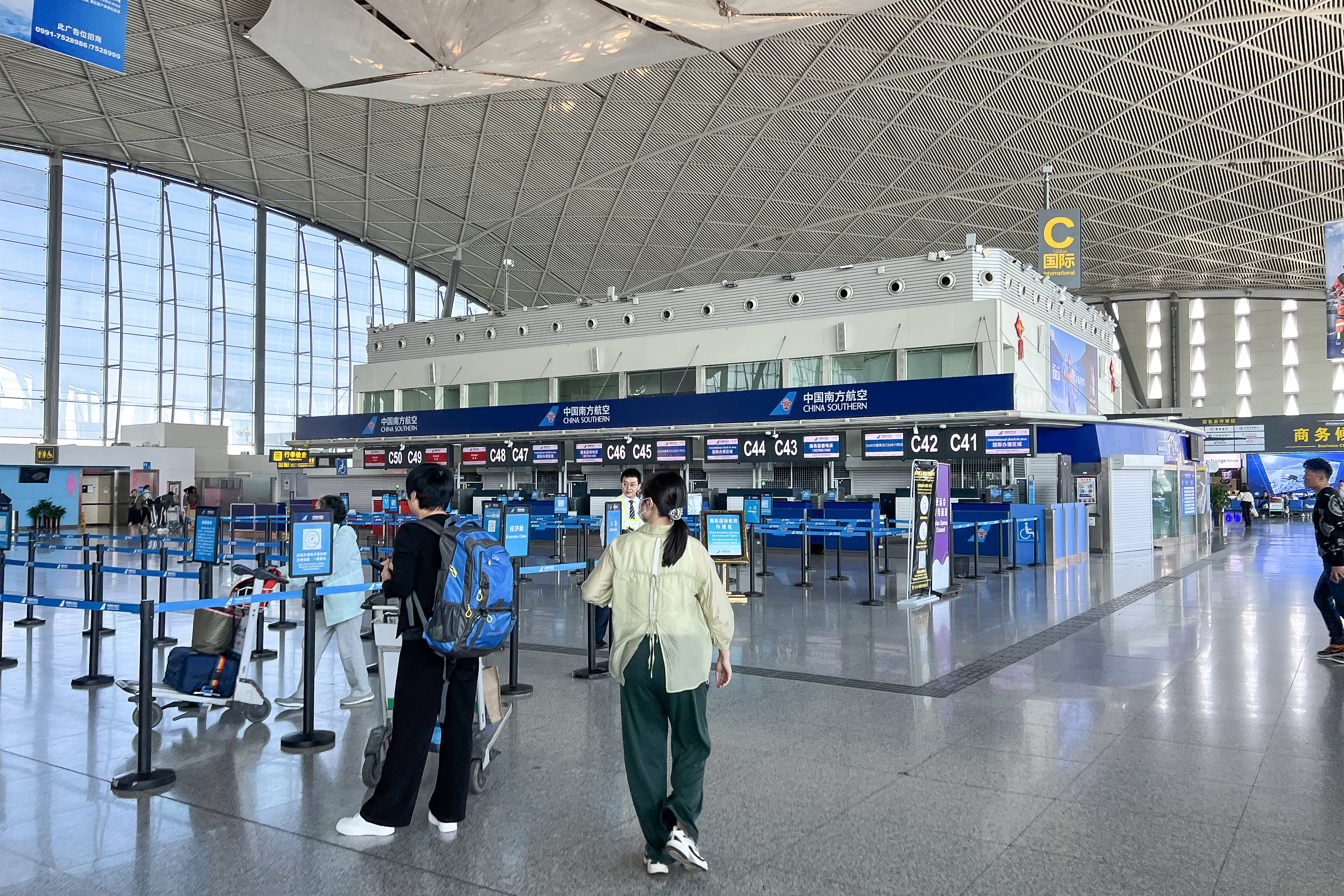
Check-in zone C

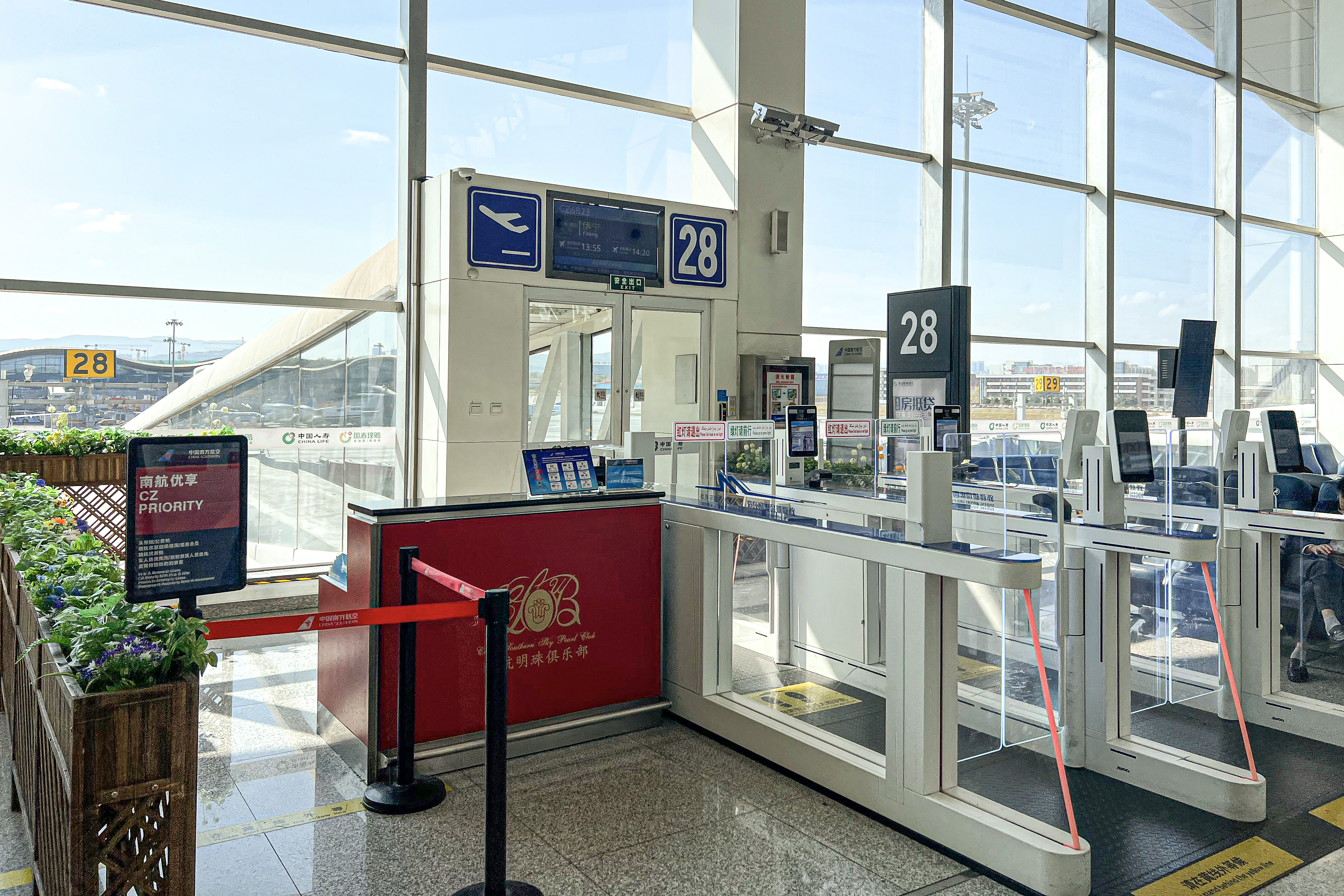
Boarding gate

==== Terminal 4 (North Terminal) ====
An expansion project, which began in 2017, is underway and will see a new terminal building covering almost 400,000 sq meters consisting of 177 gates, as well as two additional runways north of the existing. On 17 April 2025, the North Terminal officially opened. After the opening of the new T4, the previous three terminals will be converted to cargo relay stations as part of the Belt and Road Initiative.

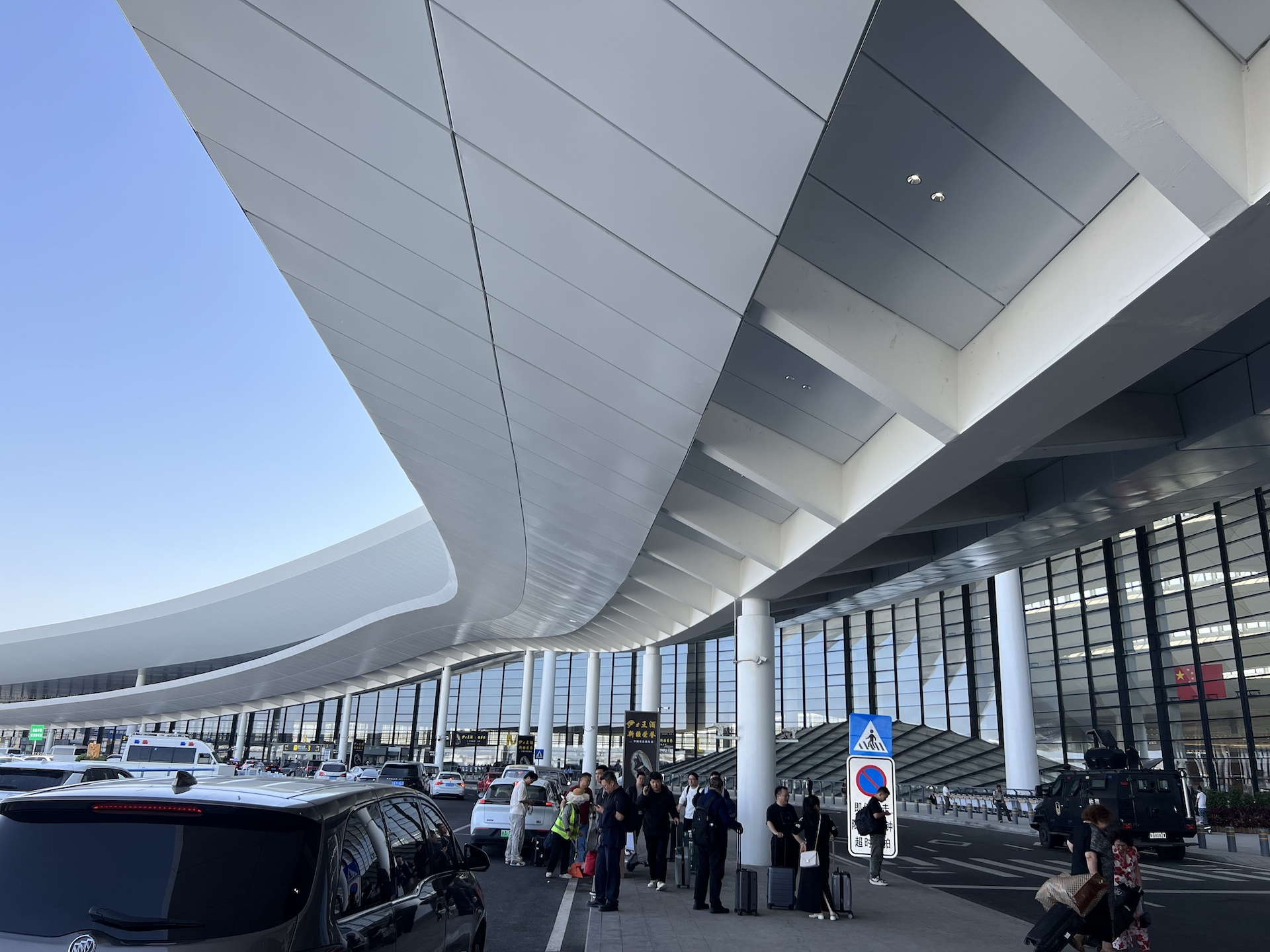
URC North Terminal

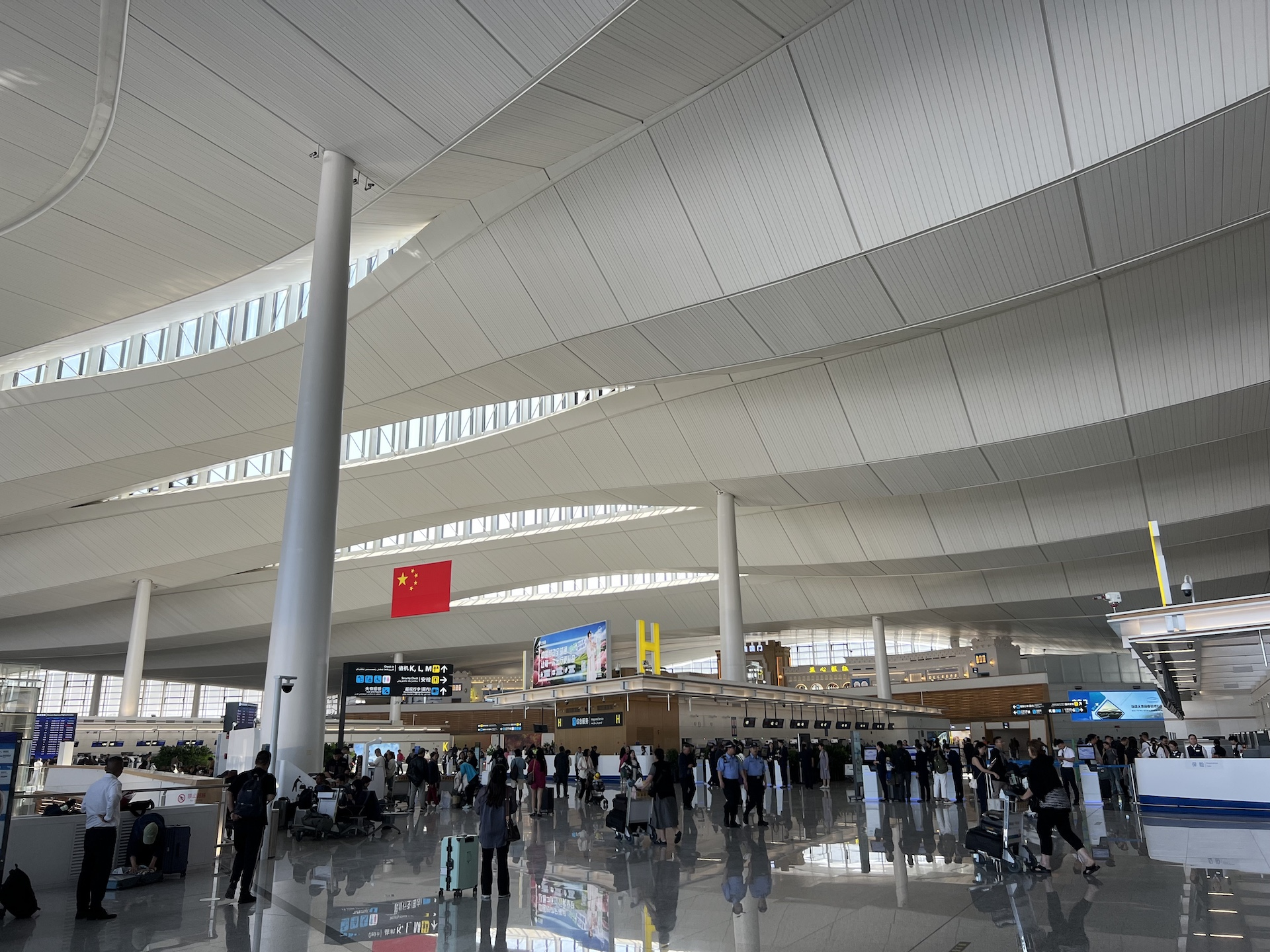
North Terminal departure hall

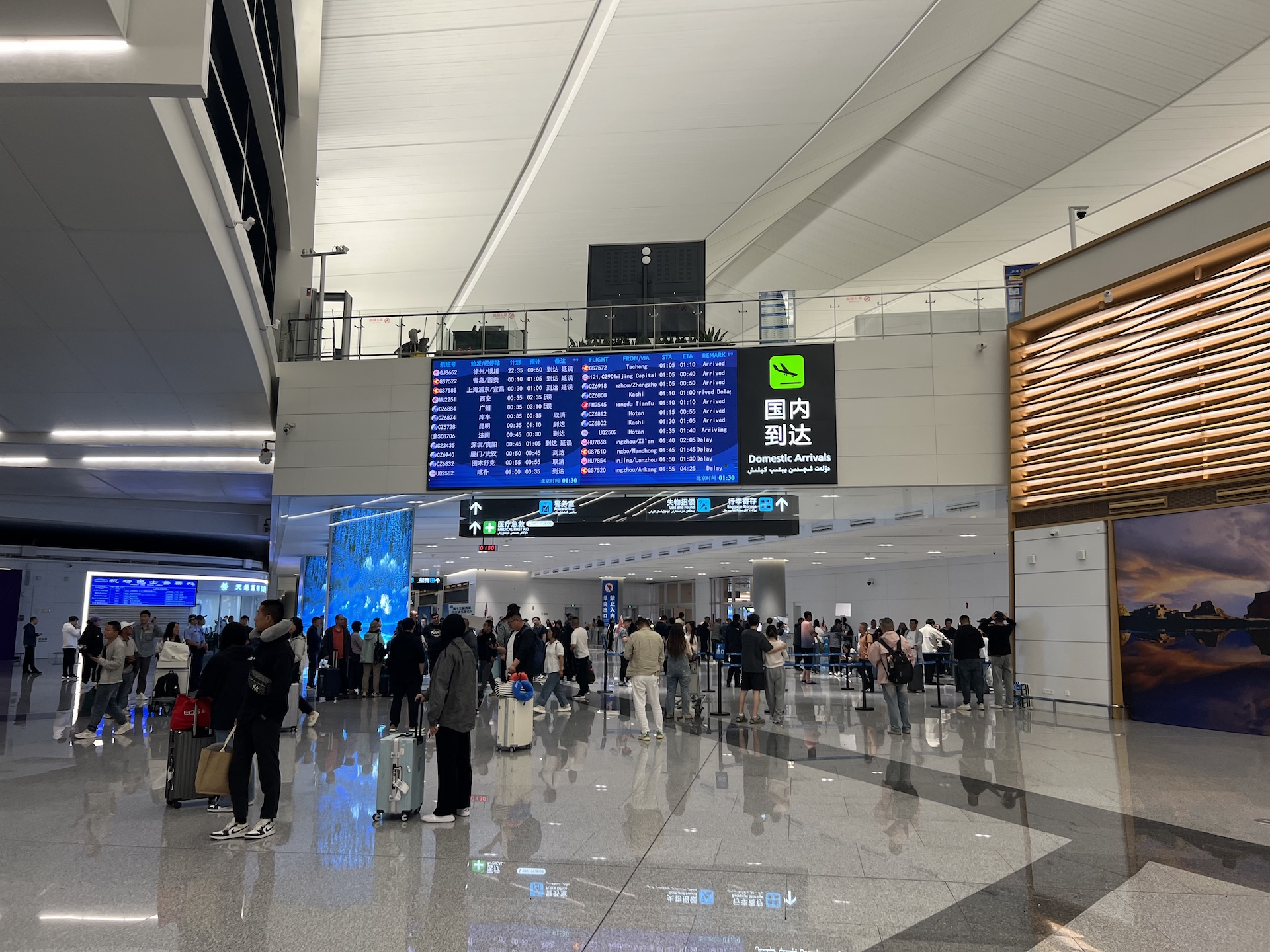
North Terminal arrival hall

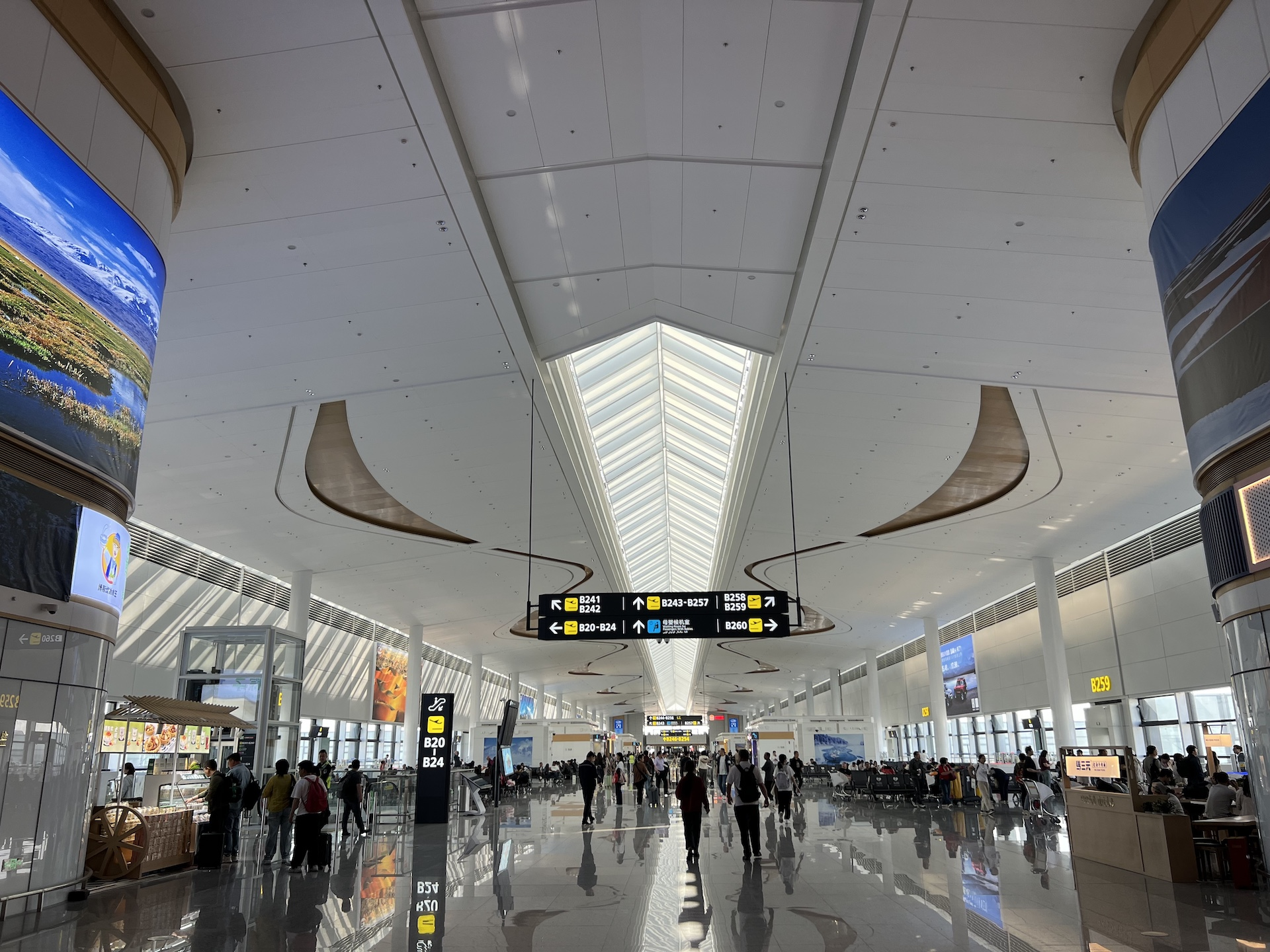
North Terminal airside

== Airlines and destinations ==
=== Passenger ===
Airlines	Destinations
9 Air	Guangzhou, Jiayuguan
Air Astana	Almaty
Aero Nomad Airlines	Bishkek
Air China	Aksu, Beijing–Capital, Chengdu–Shuangliu, Chengdu–Tianfu, Chongqing, Guangzhou, Hangzhou, Hotan, Kashgar, Moscow–Sheremetyevo, Shanghai–Pudong, Tashkent, Tbilisi, Tianjin, Wuhan, Xining, Yuncheng
Ariana Afghan Airlines	Seasonal: Kabul
Belavia	Minsk
Beijing Capital Airlines	Beijing–Daxing, Hangzhou, Nanjing, Shijiazhuang, Xiamen, Zhengzhou
Cathay Pacific	Hong Kong
Chengdu Airlines	Chengdu–Tianfu
China Eastern Airlines	Beijing–Daxing, Guangzhou, Hangzhou, Hefei, Kashgar, Kunming, Nanjing, Shanghai–Hongqiao, Shanghai–Pudong, Taiyuan, Wuhan, Wuxi, Xi'an, Yining, Zhaosu
China Southern Airlines	Aksu, Almaty, Altay, Ashgabat, Astana, Baku, Beijing–Daxing, Bishkek, Bole, Changchun, Changsha, Chengdu–Tianfu, Chongqing, Dalian, Dubai–International, Frankfurt, Dushanbe, Fuyun, Fuzhou, Guangzhou, Guiyang, Haikou, Hangzhou, Hefei, Hohhot, Hong Kong, Hotan, Islamabad, Istanbul, Jiaxing, Jieyang, Jinan, Kanas, Karamay, Kashgar, Korla, Kuala Lumpur–International, Kunming, Kuqa, Lanzhou, Lianyungang, Moscow–Sheremetyevo, Nanjing, Nanning, Nanyang, Ningbo, Osh, Qingdao, Sanya, Shache, Shanghai–Hongqiao, Shanghai–Pudong, Shenyang, Shenzhen, Shijiazhuang, Tacheng, Taiyuan, Tashkent, Tashkurgan, Tbilisi, Tehran–Imam Khomeini, Tianjin, Tumxuk, Wenzhou, Wuhan, Xiamen, Xi'an, Yerevan, Yining, Yiwu, Yutian, Zhengzhou, Zhuhai
China United Airlines	Beijing–Daxing
Chongqing Airlines	Chongqing
FlyArystan	Aqtau, Astana
Hainan Airlines	Beijing–Capital, Changsha, Chengdu–Shuangliu, Chengdu–Tianfu, Chongqing, Fuzhou, Guangzhou, Haikou, Hangzhou, Hohhot, Hotan, Jinan, Kashgar, Kuqa, Lanzhou, Nanjing, Ningbo, Qingdao, Sanya, Shanghai–Hongqiao, Shenyang, Shenzhen, Shijiazhuang, Taiyuan, Wenzhou, Wuhan, Xiamen, Xi'an, Zhengzhou
Hebei Airlines	Beijing–Daxing, Shijiazhuang
Hong Kong Airlines	Hong Kong
Jiangxi Air	Nanchang, Xi'an
Juneyao Air	Nanjing, Shanghai–Hongqiao, Shanghai–Pudong
Loong Air	Hangzhou, Jiaxing, Xuzhou, Yinchuan
Lucky Air	Chengdu–Tianfu, Kashgar, Kunming, Ngari–Gunsa, Zhengzhou
Okay Airways	Changsha, Yinchuan
Qingdao Airlines	Changsha, Chengdu–Tianfu, Yining
Red Wings Airlines	Yekaterinburg
S7 Airlines	Novosibirsk (resumes 29 March 2027)
SCAT Airlines	Şymkent
Shandong Airlines	Aksu, Bangkok–Suvarnabhumi, Fuzhou, Hangzhou, Hotan, Jinan, Kashgar, Kunming, Lanzhou, Nanjing, Ningbo, Qingdao, Taiyuan, Wuhan, Xiamen, Yinchuan, Zhengzhou
Shanghai Airlines	Chengdu–Tianfu, Hotan, Shanghai–Hongqiao, Shanghai–Pudong, Zhengzhou
Shenzhen Airlines	Korla, Lanzhou, Shenzhen
Sichuan Airlines	Beihai, Beijing–Capital, Chengdu–Shuangliu, Chengdu–Tianfu, Chongqing, Guangyuan, Hangzhou, Kashgar, Kunming, Lanzhou, Lhasa, Luzhou, Mianyang, Nanning, Sanya, Shanghai–Pudong, Xi'an, Xining, Yibin, Zhengzhou
Somon Air	Dushanbe, Khujand
Spring Airlines	Lanzhou, Ningbo, Shanghai–Hongqiao, Shijiazhuang, Xi'an, Yangzhou
Tianjin Airlines	Ankang, Aksu, Altay, Aral, Bole, Chengdu–Tianfu, Chongqing, Dunhuang, Fuyun, Guiyang, Haikou, Hami, Hangzhou, Hotan, Huizhou, Jinchang, Kashgar, Korla, Kuqa, Lanzhou, Linyi, Nalati, Ruoqiang, Sanya, Shiyan, Tacheng, Tianjin, Tumxuk, Wanzhou, Xiamen, Xi'an, Xiangyang, Yancheng, Yantai, Yichang, Yining, Zhangye, Zhaosu, Zhengzhou
Urumqi Air	Aksu, Bangkok–Suvarnabhumi, Bazhong, Changsha, Chengdu–Tianfu, Dazhou, Fuyang, Fuzhou, Guangzhou, Haikou, Hangzhou, Hanzhong, Hong Kong, Hotan, Huai'an, Jieyang, Kashgar, Lanzhou, Longnan, Luoyang, Mianyang, Nanchong, Nanjing, Ordos, Qingyang, Shanghai–Pudong, Taiyuan, Wenzhou, Wuhan, Yangzhou, Yutian, Yinchuan, Zhengzhou
Uzbekistan Airways	Fergana, Tashkent
West Air	Chongqing, Zhengzhou
XiamenAir	Beijing–Daxing, Changsha, Fuzhou, Hangzhou, Jinan, Quanzhou, Tianjin, Wuhan, Xiamen, Yinchuan, Zhengzhou

=== Cargo ===
Airlines	Destinations
Air China Cargo	Liège
ASL Airlines Belgium	Liège
Ethiopian Airlines Cargo	Addis Ababa
One Air	Nottingham
My Freighter Airlines	Niš, Urgench Tashkent
S7 Cargo	Novosibirsk
SF Airlines	Tbilisi
Silk Way Airlines	Baku
Turkish Cargo	Istanbul
Turkmenistan Airlines Cargo	Ashgabat
Uzbekistan Airways Cargo	Ostrava
YTO Cargo Airlines	Aktobe, Belgrade, Hangzhou, Islamabad, Moscow–Sheremetyevo

== Other facilities ==
When the airline existed, China Xinjiang Airlines had its headquarters on the airport property.

== Ground transport ==
International Airport station on Line 1 of Ürümqi Metro opened on 25 October 2018 and links the airport to downtown Ürümqi. In addition, the Ürümqi International Airport MRT, or Airport MRT, has opened to connect two stations of International Airport and International Airport North (North Terminal).

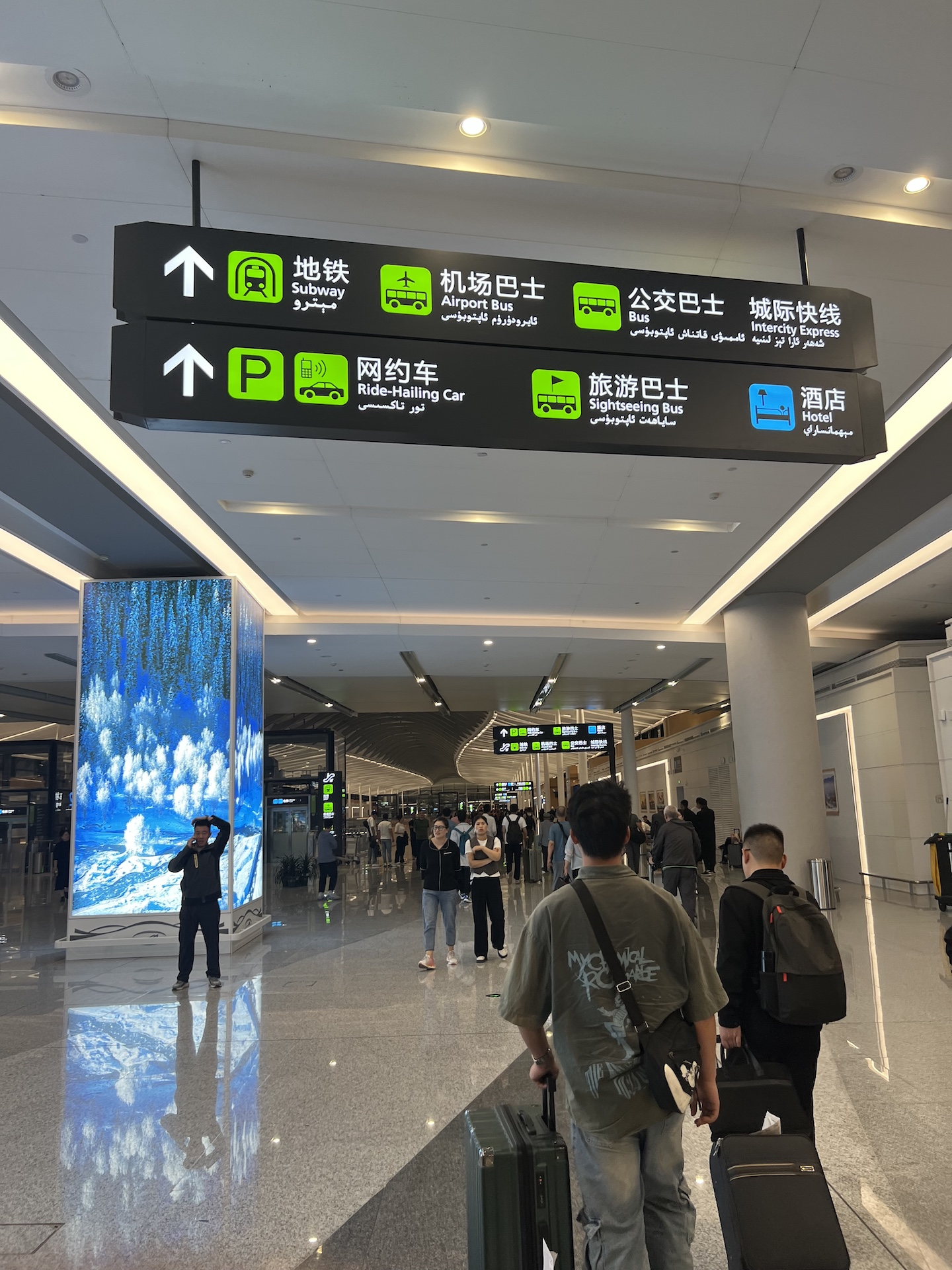
North Terminal Ground Transport Centre (GTC)

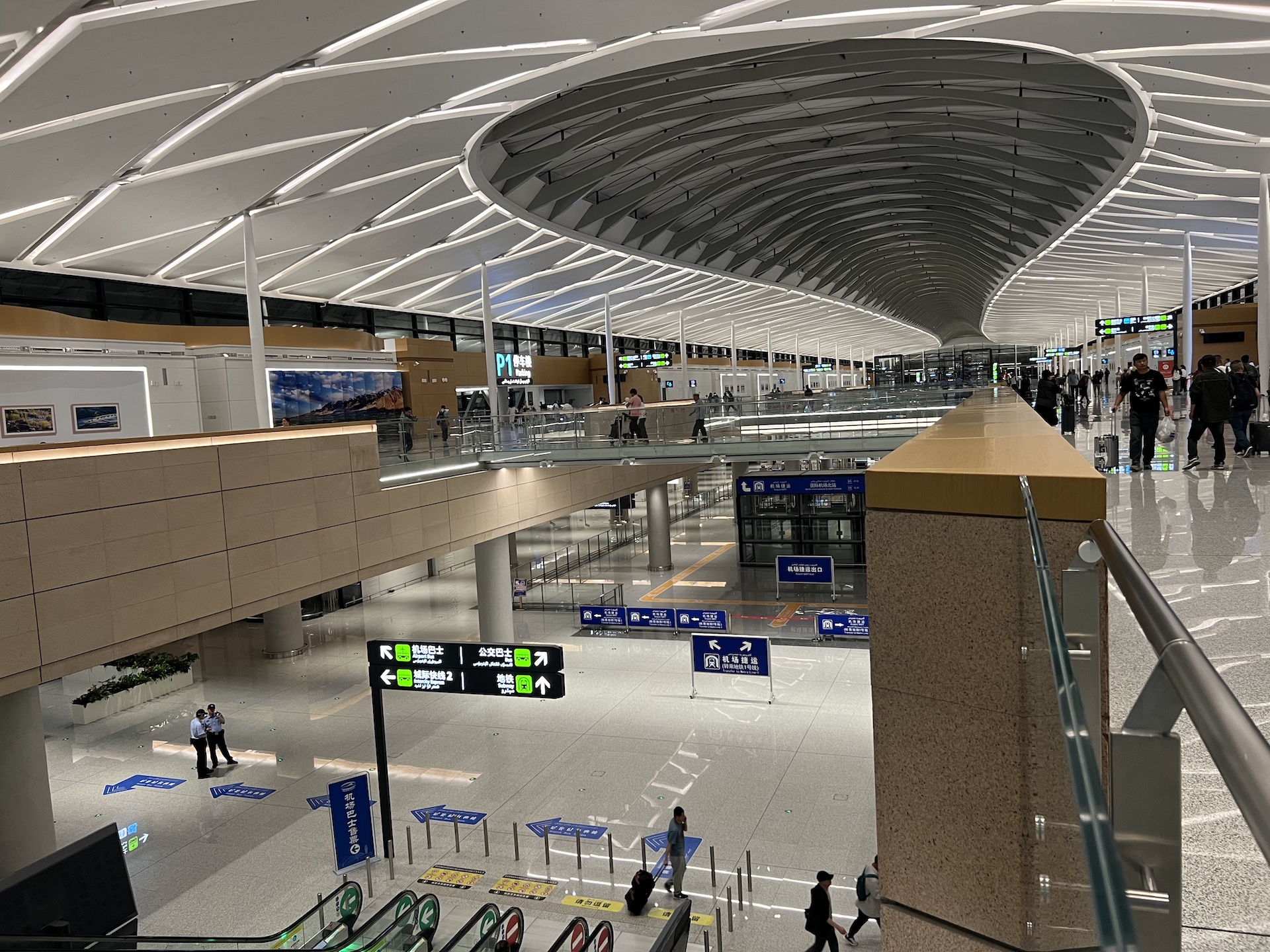
North Terminal GTC (Metro Station International Airport North)

== See also ==
- List of airports in China
- China's busiest airports by passenger traffic
