= List of China Southern Airlines destinations =

The list shows airports that are served by China Southern Airlines as part of its scheduled passenger and cargo services. The list includes the city, country, the codes of the International Air Transport Association (IATA airport code) and the International Civil Aviation Organization (ICAO airport code), and the airport's name, with the airline's hubs, cargo and focus cities, as well as terminated stations marked.

== List ==
| Main hub |
| Focus city |
| Cargo only |
| Seasonal/charter |
| Future destinations |
| Terminated destinations |

| City | Province / state | Country or region | IATA | ICAO | Airport | Ref. |
|---|---|---|---|---|---|---|
| Addis Ababa | Addis Ababa | Ethiopia | ADD | HAAB | Bole International Airport | |
| Adelaide | South Australia | Australia | ADL | YPAD | Adelaide Airport | |
| Aksu | Xinjiang | China | AKU | ZWAK | Aksu Airport | |
| Almaty | — | Kazakhstan | ALA | UAAA | Almaty International Airport | |
| Altay | Xinjiang | China | AAT | ZWAT | Altay Airport | |
| Amsterdam | North Holland | Netherlands | AMS | EHAM | Amsterdam Airport Schiphol | |
| Anchorage | Alaska | United States | ANC | PANC | Ted Stevens Anchorage International Airport | |
| Anqing | Anhui | China | AQG | ZSAQ | Anqing Tianzhushan Airport | |
| Anshan | Liaoning | China | AOG | ZYAS | Anshan Teng'ao Airport | |
| Anshun | Guizhou | China | AVA | ZUAS | Anshun Huangguoshu Airport | |
| Ashgabat | — | Turkmenistan | ASB | UTAA | Ashgabat International Airport | |
| Astana | — | Kazakhstan | TSE | UACC | Nursultan Nazarbayev International Airport | |
| Atlanta | Georgia | United States | ATL | KATL | Hartsfield-Jackson Atlanta International Airport | |
| Auckland | Auckland Region | New Zealand | AKL | NZAA | Auckland Airport | |
| Baishan | Jilin | China | NBS | ZYBS | Changbaishan Airport | |
| Baku | — | Azerbaijan | GYD | UBBB | Heydar Aliyev International Airport | |
| Bangkok | — | Thailand | DMK | VTBD | Don Mueang International Airport | |
| Bangkok | Samut Prakan Province | Thailand | BKK | VTBS | Suvarnabhumi Airport | |
| Baotou | Inner Mongolia | China | BAV | ZBAO | Baotou Airport | |
| Beijing | — | China | PEK | ZBAA | Beijing Capital International Airport | |
| Beijing | — | China | PKX | ZBAD | Beijing Daxing International Airport | |
| Beihai | Guangxi | China | BHY | ZGBH | Beihai Fucheng Airport | |
| Belgrade | — | Serbia | BEG | LYBE | Belgrade Nikola Tesla Airport | |
| Bijie | Guizhou | China | BFJ | ZUBJ | Bijie Feixiong Airport | |
| Birmingham | England | United Kingdom | BHX | EGBB | Birmingham Airport | |
| Bishkek | — | Kyrgyzstan | FRU | UAFM | Manas International Airport | |
| Boston | Massachusetts | United States | BOS | KBOS | General Edward Lawrence Logan International Airport | |
| Brisbane | Queensland | Australia | BNE | YBBN | Brisbane Airport | |
| Budapest | — | Hungary | BUD | LHBP | Budapest Ferenc Liszt International Airport | |
| Burqin | Xinjiang | China | KJI | ZWKN | Kanas Airport | |
| Busan | Yeongnam | South Korea | PUS | RKPK | Gimhae International Airport | |
| Cairns | Queensland | Australia | CNS | YCBS | Cairns Airport | |
| Cebu | Central Visayas | Philippines | CEB | RPVM | Mactan–Cebu International Airport | |
| Changchun | Jilin | China | CGQ | ZYCC | Changchun Longjia International Airport | |
| Changde | Hunan | China | CGD | ZGCD | Changde Taohuayuan Airport | |
| Changsha | Hunan | China | CSX | ZGCS | Changsha Huanghua International Airport | |
| Changzhi | Shanxi | China | CIH | ZBCZ | Changzhi Wangcun Airport | |
| Changzhou | Jiangsu | China | CZX | ZSCG | Changzhou Benniu Airport | |
| Chengdu | Sichuan | China | CTU | ZUUU | Chengdu Shuangliu International Airport | |
| Chengdu | Sichuan | China | TFU | ZUTF | Chengdu Tianfu International Airport | |
| Cheongju | Hoseo | South Korea | CJJ | RKTU | Cheongju International Airport | |
| Chiang Mai | Chiang Mai Province | Thailand | CNX | VTCC | Chiang Mai International Airport | |
| Chicago | Illinois | United States | ORD | KORD | O'Hare International Airport | |
| Chizhou | Anhui | China | JUH | ZSJH | Chizhou Jiuhuashan Airport | |
| Chongqing | Chongqing | China | CKG | ZUCK | Chongqing Jiangbei International Airport | |
| Christchurch | Canterbury | New Zealand | CHC | NZCH | Christchurch Airport | |
| Colombo | — | Sri Lanka | CMB | VCBI | Bandaranaike International Airport | |
| Daegu | Yeongnam | South Korea | TAE | RKTN | Daegu International Airport | |
| Dallas | Texas | United States | DFW | KDFW | Dallas-Fort Worth International Airport | |
| Dali | Yunnan | China | DLU | ZPDL | Dali Airport | |
| Dalian | Liaoning | China | DLC | ZYTL | Dalian Zhoushuizi International Airport | |
| Da Nang | — | Vietnam | DAD | VVDN | Da Nang International Airport | |
| Dandong | Liaoning | China | DDG | ZYDD | Dandong Langtou Airport | |
| Daqing | Heilongjiang | China | DQA | ZYDQ | Daqing Sartu Airport | |
| Darwin | Northern Territory | Australia | DRW | YPDN | Darwin International Airport | |
| Datong | Shanxi | China | DAT | ZBDT | Datong Yungang Airport | |
| Delhi | National Capital Territory of India | India | DEL | VIDP | Indira Gandhi International Airport | |
| Denpasar | Bali | Indonesia | DPS | WADD | Ngurah Rai International Airport | |
| Dhaka | Dhaka Division | Bangladesh | DAC | VGHS | Shahjalal International Airport | |
| Doha | — | Qatar | DOH | OTHH | Hamad International Airport | |
| Dubai | Emirate of Dubai | United Arab Emirates | DXB | OMDB | Dubai International Airport | |
| Dunhuang | Gansu | China | DNH | ZLDH | Dunhuang Airport | |
| Dushanbe | — | Tajikistan | DYU | UTDD | Dushanbe International Airport | |
| Enshi | Hubei | China | ENH | ZHES | Enshi Xujiaping Airport | |
| Frankfurt | Hesse | Germany | FRA | EDDF | Frankfurt Airport | |
| Fukuoka | Fukuoka Prefecture | Japan | FUK | RJFF | Fukuoka Airport | |
| Fuyang | Anhui | China | FUG | ZSFY | Fuyang Xiguan Airport | |
| Fuyuan | Heilongjiang | China | FYJ | ZYFY | Fuyuan Dongji Airport | |
| Fuzhou | Fujian | China | FOC | ZSFZ | Fuzhou Changle International Airport | |
| Ganzhou | Jiangxi | China | KOW | ZSGZ | Ganzhou Huangjin Airport | |
| Guam | — | Guam | GUM | PGUM | Antonio B. Won Pat International Airport | |
| Guangzhou | Guangdong | China | CAN | ZGGG | Guangzhou Baiyun International Airport | |
| Guiyang | Guizhou | China | KWE | ZUGY | Guiyang Longdongbao International Airport | |
| Guilin | Guangxi | China | KWL | ZGKL | Guilin Liangjiang International Airport | |
| Gwangju | Hoseo | South Korea | KWJ | RKJJ | Gwangju Airport | |
| Haikou | Hainan | China | HAK | ZJHK | Haikou Meilan International Airport | |
| Hami City | Xinjiang | China | HMI | ZWHM | Hami Airport | |
| Handan | Hebei | China | HDG | ZBHD | Handan Airport | |
| Hangzhou | Zhejiang | China | HGH | ZSHC | Hangzhou Xiaoshan International Airport | |
| Hanoi | — | Vietnam | HAN | VVNB | Noi Bai International Airport | |
| Hanzhong | Shaanxi | China | HZG | ZLHZ | Hanzhong Chenggu Airport | |
| Harbin | Heilongjiang | China | HRB | ZYHB | Harbin Taiping International Airport | |
| Hefei | Anhui | China | ~~HFE~~ | ~~ZSOF~~ | Hefei Luogang International Airport | |
| Hefei | Anhui | China | HFE | ZSOF | Hefei Xinqiao International Airport | |
| Heihe | Heilongjiang | China | HEK | ZYHE | Heihe Aihui Airport | |
| Hiroshima | Hiroshima Prefecture | Japan | HIJ | RJOA | Hiroshima Airport | |
| Ho Chi Minh City | — | Vietnam | SGN | VVTS | Tan Son Nhat International Airport | |
| Hohhot | Inner Mongolia | China | HET | ZBHH | Hohhot Baita International Airport | |
| Hong Kong | — | Hong Kong | HKG | VHHH | Hong Kong International Airport | |
| Hong Kong | — | Hong Kong | ~~HKG~~ | ~~VHHH~~ | Kai Tak International Airport | |
| Hotan | Xinjiang | China | HTN | ZWTN | Hotan Airport | |
| Huaihua | Hunan | China | HJJ | ZGCJ | Huaihua Zhijiang Airport | |
| Huangshan | Anhui | China | TXN | ZSTX | Huangshan Tunxi International Airport | |
| Hulunbuir | Inner Mongolia | China | HLD | ZBLA | Hulunbuir Hailar Airport | |
| Ibaraki | Ibaraki Prefecture | Japan | IBR | RJAH | Ibaraki Airport | |
| Irkutsk | Irkutsk Oblast | Russia | IKT | UIII | International Airport Irkutsk | |
| Islamabad | Islamabad Capital Territory | Pakistan | ~~ISB~~ | OPRN | Benazir Bhutto International Airport | |
| Islamabad | Islamabad Capital Territory | Pakistan | ISB | OPIS | Islamabad International Airport | |
| Istanbul | — | Turkey | ISL | LTBA | Atatürk Airport | |
| Istanbul | — | Turkey | IST | LTFM | Istanbul Airport | |
| Jakarta | Special Capital Region of Jakarta | Indonesia | CGK | WIII | Soekarno–Hatta International Airport | |
| Jeddah | Makkah Province | Saudi Arabia | JED | OEJN | King Abdulaziz International Airport | |
| Jeju | Jeju Province | South Korea | CJU | RKPC | Jeju International Airport | |
| Jiamusi | Heilongjiang | China | JMU | ZYJM | Jiamusi Dongjiao Airport | |
| Jinan | Shandong | China | TNA | ZSJN | Jinan Yaoqiang International Airport | |
| Ji'an | Jiangxi | China | JGS | ZLJN | Jinggangshan Airport | |
| Jingdezhen | Jiangxi | China | JDZ | ZSJD | Jingdezhen Luojia Airport | |
| Jinghong | Yunnan | China | JHG | ZPJH | Xishuangbanna Gasa Airport | |
| Jining | Shandong | China | JNG | ZLJN | Jining Qufu Airport | |
| Jiujiang | Jiangxi | China | JIU | ZSJJ | Jiujiang Lushan Airport | |
| Jiuzhaigou | Sichuan | China | JZH | ZUJZ | Jiuzhai Huanglong Airport | |
| Jixi | Heilongjiang | China | JXA | ZYJX | Jixi Xingkaihu Airport | |
| Kaili | Guizhou | China | KJH | ZUKJ | Kaili Huangping Airport | |
| Kaohsiung | Kaohsiung | Taiwan | KHH | RCKH | Kaohsiung International Airport | |
| Karamay | Xinjiang | China | KRY | ZWKM | Karamay Airport | |
| Kashgar | Xinjiang | China | KHG | ZWSH | Kashgar Airport | |
| Kathmandu | Bagmati Province | Nepal | KTM | VNKT | Tribhuvan International Airport | |
| Khabarovsk | Khabarovsk Krai | Russia | KHV | UHHH | Khabarovsk Novy Airport | |
| Khujand | — | Tajikistan | LBD | UTDL | Khujand Airport | |
| Ko Samui | — | Thailand | USM | VTSM | Samui Airport | |
| Korla | Xinjiang | China | KRL | ZWKL | Korla Airport | |
| Kota Kinabalu | Sabah | Malaysia | BKI | WBKK | Kota Kinabalu International Airport | |
| Krabi | — | Thailand | KBV | VTSG | Krabi International Airport | |
| Kuala Lumpur | Federal Territories | Malaysia | KUL | WMKK | Kuala Lumpur International Airport | |
| Kunming | Yunnan | China | KMG | ZPPP | Kunming Changshui International Airport | |
| Kunming | Yunnan | China | ~~KMG~~ | ~~ZPPP~~ | Kunming Wujiaba International Airport | |
| Kuqa | Xinjiang | China | KCA | ZWKC | Kuqa Qiuci Airport | |
| Lahore | Punjab | Pakistan | LHE | OPLA | Allama Iqbal International Airport | |
| Langkawi | Kedah | Malaysia | LGK | WMKL | Langkawi International Airport | |
| Lanzhou | Gansu | China | LHW | ZLLL | Lanzhou Zhongchuan International Airport | |
| Laoag City | Ilocos Norte | Philippines | LAO | RPLI | Laoag International Airport | |
| Lhasa | Tibet | China | LXA | ZULS | Lhasa Gonggar Airport | |
| Lianyungang | Jiangsu | China | LYG | ZSLG | Lianyungang Baitabu Airport | |
| Libo | Guizhou | China | LLB | ZULB | Libo Airport | |
| Lijiang | Yunnan | China | LJG | ZPLJ | Lijiang Sanyi International Airport | |
| Liping | Guizhou | China | HZH | ZUNP | Liping Airport | |
| Lishui | Zhejiang | China | LIJ | ZSLI | Lishui Airport | |
| Liuzhou | Guangxi | China | LZH | ZGZH | Liuzhou Bailian Airport | |
| London | England | United Kingdom | LGW | EGKK | Gatwick Airport | |
| London | England | United Kingdom | LHR | EGLL | Heathrow Airport | |
| London | England | United Kingdom | STN | EGSS | London Stansted Airport | |
| Los Angeles | California | United States | LAX | KLAX | Los Angeles International Airport | |
| Luoyang | Henan | China | LYA | ZHLY | Luoyang Beijiao Airport | |
| Luzhou | Sichuan | China | ~~LZO~~ | ~~ZULZ~~ | Luzhou Lantian Airport | |
| Luxembourg City | — | Luxembourg | LUX | ELLX | Luxembourg Airport | |
| Luzhou | Sichuan | China | LZO | ZULZ | Luzhou Yunlong Airport | |
| Macau | — | Macau | MFM | VMMC | Macau International Airport | |
| Madrid | — | Spain | MAD | LEMD | Madrid Barajas Airport | |
| Malé | — | Maldives | MLE | VRMM | Velana International Airport | |
| Manado | North Sulawesi | Indonesia | MDC | WAMM | Sam Ratulangi International Airport | |
| Manila | Metro Manila | Philippines | MNL | RPLL | Ninoy Aquino International Airport | |
| Manzhouli | Inner Mongolia | China | NZH | ZBMZ | Manzhouli Xijiao Airport | |
| Medina | — | Saudi Arabia | MED | OEMA | Prince Mohammad bin Abdulaziz International Airport | |
| Mei County | Guangdong | China | MXZ | ZGMX | Meixian Airport | |
| Melbourne | Victoria | Australia | MEL | YMML | Melbourne Airport | |
| Mexico City | Mexico City | Mexico | MEX | MMMX | Mexico City International Airport | |
| Mianyang | Sichuan | China | MIG | ZUMY | Mianyang Nanjiao Airport | |
| Milan | Lombardy | Italy | MXP | LIMC | Milan Malpensa Airport | |
| Mohe | Heilongjiang | China | OHE | ZYMH | Mohe Gulian Airport | |
| Moscow | Central Federal District | Russia | SVO | UUEE | Sheremetyevo International Airport | |
| Muan | Hoseo | South Korea | MWX | RKJB | Muan International Airport | |
| Mudanjiang | Heilongjiang | China | MDG | ZYMD | Mudanjiang Hailang International Airport | |
| Nagoya | Aichi Prefecture | Japan | NGO | RJGG | Chubu Centrair International Airport | |
| Nairobi | Nairobi | Kenya | NBO | HKJK | Jomo Kenyatta International Airport | |
| Nanchang | Jiangxi | China | KHN | ZSCN | Nanchang Changbei International Airport | |
| Nanchong | Sichuan | China | NAO | ZUNC | Nanchong Gaoping Airport | |
| Nanjing | Jiangsu | China | NKG | ZSNJ | Nanjing Lukou International Airport | |
| Nanning | Guangxi | China | NNG | ZGNN | Nanning Wuxu International Airport | |
| Nantong | Jiangsu | China | NTG | ZSNT | Nantong Xingdong International Airport | |
| Nanyang | Henan | China | NNY | ZHNY | Nanyang Jiangying Airport | |
| New York City | New York | United States | JFK | KJFK | John F. Kennedy International Airport | |
| Nha Trang | — | Vietnam | CXR | VVCR | Cam Ranh International Airport | |
| Niigata | Niigata Prefecture | Japan | KIJ | RJSN | Niigata Airport | |
| Ningbo | Zhejiang | China | NGB | ZSNB | Ningbo Lishe International Airport | |
| Novosibirsk | Novosibirsk Oblast | Russia | OVB | UNNT | Tolmachevo Airport | |
| Ordos | Inner Mongolia | China | DSN | ZBDS | Ordos Ejin Horo International Airport | |
| Osaka | Osaka Prefecture | Japan | KIX | RJBB | Kansai International Airport | |
| Osh | - | Kyrgyzstan | OSS | UAFO | Osh Airport | |
| Palu | Central Sulawesi | Indonesia | PLW | WAFF | Mutiara SIS Al-Jufrie Airport | |
| Paris | Île-de-France | France | CDG | LFPG | Charles de Gaulle Airport | |
| Penang | — | Malaysia | PEN | WMKP | Penang International Airport | |
| Perth | Western Australia | Australia | PER | YPPH | Perth Airport | |
| Phnom Penh | — | Cambodia | PNH | VDPP | Phnom Penh International Airport | |
| Phnom Penh | Kandal Province | Cambodia | KTI | VDTI | Techo International Airport | |
| Phu Quoc | — | Vietnam | PQC | VVPQ | Phu Quoc International Airport | |
| Phuket | Phuket Province | Thailand | HKT | VTSP | Phuket International Airport | |
| Port Louis | — | Mauritius | MRU | FIMP | Sir Seewoosagur Ramgoolam International Airport | |
| Pyongyang | — | North Korea | FNJ | ZKPY | Pyongyang Sunan International Airport | |
| Riyadh | — | Saudi Arabia | RUH | OERK | King Khalid International Airport | |
| Saint Petersburg | Northwestern Federal District | Russia | LED | ULLI | Pulkovo Airport | |
| Qianjiang | Chongqing | China | JIQ | ZUQJ | Qianjiang Wulingshan Airport | |
| Qiemo | Xinjiang | China | IQM | ZWCM | Qiemo Yudu Airport | |
| Qingdao | Shandong | China | TAO | ZSQD | Qingdao Jiaodong International Airport | |
| Qingdao | Shandong | China | ~~TAO~~ | ~~ZSQD~~ | Qingdao Liuting International Airport | |
| Qiqihar | Heilongjiang | China | NDG | ZYQQ | Qiqihar Sanjiazi Airport | |
| Rizhao | Shandong | China | RIZ | ZSRZ | Rizhao Shanzihe Airport | |
| Rome | Lazio | Italy | FCO | LIRF | Leonardo da Vinci–Fiumicino Airport | |
| Saipan | — | Northern Mariana Islands | SPN | PGSN | Saipan International Airport | |
| Samarqand | Samarqand viloyati | Uzbekistan | SKD | UTSS | Samarqand International Airport | |
| San Francisco | California | United States | SFO | KSFO | San Francisco International Airport | |
| Sanya | Hainan | China | SYX | ZJSY | Sanya Phoenix International Airport | |
| Sapporo | Hokkaido | Japan | CTS | RJCC | New Chitose Airport | |
| Sendai | Tohoku | Japan | SDJ | RJSS | Sendai Airport | |
| Seoul | Seoul Capital Area | South Korea | GMP | RKSS | Gimpo International Airport | |
| Seoul | Seoul Capital Area | South Korea | ICN | RKSI | Incheon International Airport | |
| Shanghai | — | China | SHA | ZSPD | Shanghai Hongqiao International Airport | |
| Shanghai | — | China | PVG | ZSSS | Shanghai Pudong International Airport | |
| Sharjah | Emirate of Sharjah | United Arab Emirates | SHJ | OMSJ | Sharjah International Airport | |
| Shantou | Guangdong | China | SWA | ZGOW | Jieyang Chaoshan International Airport | |
| Shenyang | Liaoning | China | SHE | ZYTX | Shenyang Taoxian International Airport | |
| Shenzhen | Guangdong | China | SZX | ZGSC | Shenzhen Bao'an International Airport | |
| Shihezi | Xinjiang | China | SHF | ZWHZ | Shihezi Huayuan Airport | |
| Shijiazhuang | Hebei | China | SJW | ZSHC | Shijiazhuang Zhengding International Airport | |
| Shiyan | Hubei | China | WDS | ZHSY | Shiyan Wudangshan Airport | |
| Shizuoka | Shizuoka Prefecture | Japan | FSZ | RJNS | Shizuoka Airport | |
| Siem Reap | — | Cambodia | SAI | VDSA | Siem Reap–Angkor International Airport | |
| Siem Reap | — | Cambodia | REP | VDSR | Siem Reap International Airport | |
| Singapore | — | Singapore | SIN | WSSS | Changi Airport | |
| Surabaya | East Java | Indonesia | SUB | WARR | Juanda International Airport | |
| Surat Thani | Surat Thani Province | Thailand | URT | VTSB | Surat Thani Airport | |
| Sydney | New South Wales | Australia | SYD | YSSY | Sydney Airport | |
| Tacheng | Xinjiang | China | TCG | ZWTC | Tacheng Qianquan Airport | |
| Taipei | Northern Taiwan | Taiwan | TPE | RCTP | Taoyuan International Airport | |
| Taiyuan | Shanxi | China | TYN | ZBYN | Taiyuan Wusu International Airport | |
| Tashkent | — | Uzbekistan | TAS | UTTT | Islam Karimov Tashkent International Airport | |
| Tashkurgan | Xinjiang | China | HQL | none | Tashkurgan Khunjerab Airport | |
| Tbilisi | — | Georgia | TBS | UGTB | Shota Rustaveli Tbilisi International Airport | |
| Tehran | Tehran province | Iran | IKA | OIIE | Tehran Imam Khomeini International Airport | |
| Tengchong | Yunnan | China | TCZ | ZUTC | Tengchong Tuofeng Airport | |
| Houston | Texas | United States | IAH | KIAH | George Bush Intercontinental Airport | |
| Tianjin | Tianjin | China | TSN | ZBTJ | Tianjin Binhai International Airport | |
| Tokyo | Ōta | Japan | HND | RJTT | Haneda Airport | |
| Tokyo | Chiba Prefecture | Japan | NRT | RJAA | Narita International Airport | |
| Tongliao | Inner Mongolia | China | TGO | ZBTL | Tongliao Airport | |
| Tongren | Guizhou | China | TEN | ZUTR | Tongren Fenghuang Airport | |
| Toronto | Ontario | Canada | YYZ | CYYZ | Toronto Pearson International Airport | |
| Toyama | Toyama Prefecture | Japan | TOY | RJNT | Toyama Airport | |
| Urumqi | Xinjiang | China | URC | ZWWW | Ürümqi Tianshan International Airport | |
| Vancouver | British Columbia | Canada | YVR | CYVR | Vancouver International Airport | |
| Vienna | — | Austria | VIE | LOWW | Vienna International Airport | |
| Vientiane | — | Laos | VTE | VLVT | Wattay International Airport | |
| Vladivostok | Primorsky Krai | Russia | VVO | UHWW | Vladivostok International Airport | |
| Weihai | Shandong | China | WEH | ZSWH | Weihai Dashuibo Airport | |
| Wenzhou | Zhejiang | China | WNZ | ZSWZ | Wenzhou Longwan International Airport | |
| Wuhan | Hubei | China | WUH | ZHHH | Wuhan Tianhe International Airport | |
| Wuxi | Jiangsu | China | WUX | ZSWX | Sunan Shuofang International Airport | |
| Xiamen | Fujian | China | XMN | ZSAM | Xiamen Gaoqi International Airport | |
| Xi'an | Shaanxi | China | XIY | ZLXY | Xi'an Xianyang International Airport | |
| Xiangyang | Hubei | China | XFN | ZHXF | Xiangyang Liuji Airport | |
| Xilinhot | Inner Mongolia | China | XIL | ZBXH | Xilinhot Airport | |
| Xingyi | Guizhou | China | ACX | ZUYI | Xingyi Wanfenglin Airport | |
| Xining | Qinghai | China | XNN | ZLXN | Xining Caojiabao International Airport | |
| Xinyuan | Xinjiang | China | NLT | ZWNL | Xinyuan Nalati Airport | |
| Xuzhou | Jiangsu | China | XUZ | ZSXZ | Xuzhou Guanyin International Airport | |
| Yancheng | Jiangsu | China | YNZ | ZSYN | Yancheng Nanyang International Airport | |
| Yangon | Yangon Region | Myanmar | RGN | VYYY | Yangon International Airport | |
| Yangzhou | Jiangsu | China | YTY | ZSYA | Yangzhou Taizhou International Airport | |
| Yanji | Jilin | China | YNJ | ZYYJ | Yanji Chaoyangchuan International Airport | |
| Yantai | Shandong | China | ~~YNT~~ | ~~ZSYT~~ | Yantai Laishan International Airport | |
| Yantai | Shandong | China | YNT | ZSYT | Yantai Penglai International Airport | |
| Yarkant | Xinjiang | China | QSZ | ZSWC | Shache Ye'erqiang Airport | |
| Yerevan | — | Armenia | EVN | UDYZ | Zvartnots International Airport | |
| Yichang | Hubei | China | YIH | ZHYC | Yichang Sanxia Airport | |
| Yichun | Heilongjiang | China | LDS | ZYLD | Yichun Lindu Airport | |
| Yinchuan | Ningxia | China | INC | ZLIC | Yinchuan Hedong International Airport | |
| Yining | Xinjiang | China | YIN | ZWYN | Yining Airport | |
| Yiwu | Zhejiang | China | YIW | ZSYW | Yiwu Airport | |
| Yongzhou | Hunan | China | LLF | ZGLG | Yongzhou Lingling Airport | |
| Yulin | Shaanxi | China | UYN | ZLYL | Yulin Yuyang Airport | |
| Yuncheng | Shanxi | China | YCU | ZBYC | Yuncheng Zhangxiao Airport | |
| Zhangjiajie | Hunan | China | DYG | ZGDY | Zhangjiajie Hehua International Airport | |
| Zhanjiang | Guangdong | China | ~~ZHA~~ | ~~ZGZJ~~ | Zhanjiang Airport | |
| Zhanjiang | Guangdong | China | ZHA | ZGZJ | Zhanjiang Wuchuan Airport | |
| Zhaosu | Xinjiang | China | ZFL | ZWZS | Zhaosu Tianma Airport | |
| Zhengzhou | Henan | China | CGO | ZHCC | Zhengzhou Xinzheng International Airport | |
| Zhongdian | Yunnan | China | DIG | ZPDQ | Diqing Shangri-La Airport | |
| Zhuhai | Guangdong | China | ZUH | ZGSD | Zhuhai Jinwan Airport | |
| Zhoushan | Zhejiang | China | HSN | ZSZS | Zhoushan Putuoshan Airport | |
| Zunyi | Guizhou | China | ZYI | ZUZY | Zunyi Xinzhou Airport | |
