= YTW =

YTW may refer to

- Yield to worst, a variant of yield to maturity
- Yutian Wanfang Airport, IATA code YTW
