= Yan'an Nanniwan Airport =

Airport in Yan'an, Shaanxi, China

Yan'an Nanniwan Airport 延安南泥湾机场
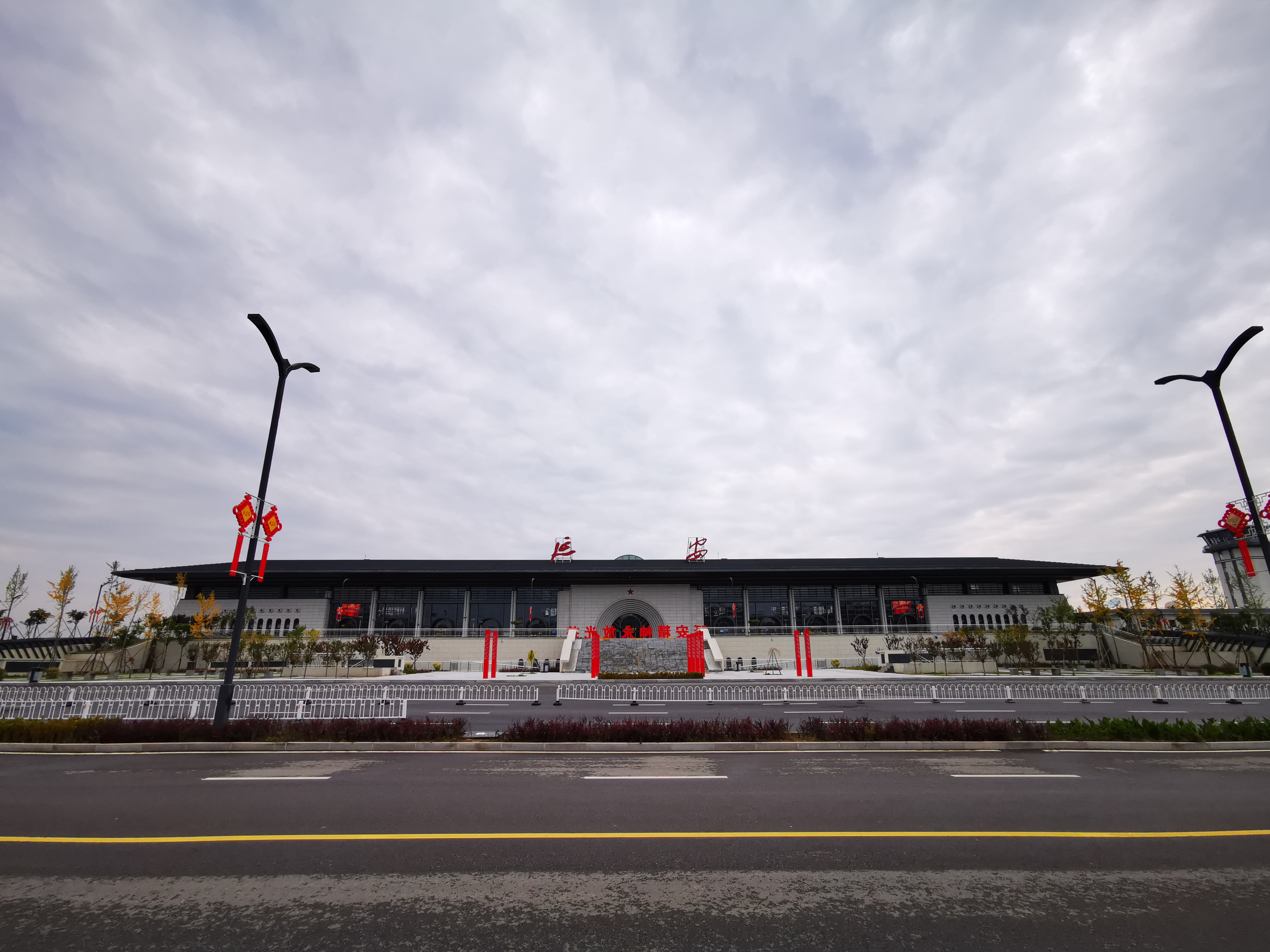
- IATA: ENY; ICAO: ZLYA

Summary
- Airport type: Public / military
- Serves: Yan'an
- Location: Liulin, Baota, Yan'an, Shaanxi, China
- Opened: 8 November 2018; 7 years ago
- Coordinates: 36°28′35″N 109°27′55″E
- Website: yanan.cwag.com

Map
- Location of airport in China

Runways
Direction	Length		Surface
Direction	m	ft	Surface
17/35	3,000	9,843

Statistics (2025)
- Passengers: 644,562
- Aircraft movements: 11,274
- Cargo (metric tons): 489.2

Yan'an Nanniwan Airport
- Simplified Chinese: 延安南泥湾机场
- Traditional Chinese: 延安南泥灣機場
Transcriptions
Standard Mandarin
- Hanyu Pinyin: Yán'ān Nánníwān Jīchǎng

Yan'an Nanniwan Airport (IATA: ENY, ICAO: ZLYA) is a dual-use military and public airport serving the city of Yan'an in northern Shaanxi Province. It is located in Liulin Town (柳林), Baota District, 13 kilometres (8.1 mi) southwest of the city center.

Yan'an was formerly served by Yan'an Ershilipu Airport. In 2002, the Yan'an city government proposed the construction of a new airport to replace Ershilipu and it was approved by the Chinese national government in 2009. Nanniwan Airport was opened on 8 November 2018 with an inaugural China Eastern Airlines flight from Hangzhou Xiaoshan International Airport, and all civil flights were transferred to Nanniwan from Ershilipu Airport.

== History ==
Yan'an Airport was initially built in January 1936 by the Kuomintang Northeast Army under Zhang Xueliang and the 17th Route Army under Yang Hucheng. After the Xi'an Incident, it was taken over by the CCP along with the city of Yan'an. The airport is the first airport that the CCP has renovated, used, and managed.

Yan'an Airport opened to civilian flights in 1958, becoming the second civilian airport in Shaanxi Province after Xi'an.

In 1980, Yan'an Airport was relocated to Dongershilipu Airport, located 7 kilometers from the city center. The airport had a 4C flight zone rating and a 2800-meter-long, 45-meter-wide runway with a 0.22-meter-thick concrete surface and a 0.10-meter-thick asphalt overlay, as well as a parallel taxiway, capable of accommodating aircraft up to the B737 and A320 series.

With the growth of Yan'an's urban population, the conflict between airport airspace protection and urban development has become increasingly prominent. In response, the Yan'an Municipal Party Committee and Government proposed relocating Yan'an Airport in 2002.

In June 2009, the State Council and the Central Military Commission approved the relocation. The new airport is located on the top of Shangjiagou Mountain, 20 li south of Liulin Town, Yan'an City, 13.5 kilometers from the city center. It was being built to military Class II and civil aviation Class 4C standards, and would be used for both military and civilian purposes, with civil aviation as a feeder airport. The total investment for the new airport project was approximately 3 billion yuan and construction began in July 2013. It would have a 3,000-meter-long and 45-meter-wide runway, an 18-meter-wide parallel taxiway, a 7-stand apron, a 13,000-square-meter civil aviation terminal building, 4 boarding bridges, and corresponding supporting office, production, and living facilities. It could accommodate B737 and A320 aircraft.

In October 2017, the Civil Aviation Administration of China named the new airport "Yan'an Nanniwan Airport". The airport officially started operation in 2018.

== Facilities ==
Nanniwan Airport has a runway that is 3,000 metres (9,800 ft) long and 60 metres (200 ft) wide (class 4C), a 13,000-square-metre (140,000 sq ft) terminal building, and seven aircraft parking aprons. It is projected to serve 1 million passengers and 800 tons of cargo annually by 2020.

== Airlines and destinations ==
Airlines	Destinations
Air China	Beijing–Capital
Air Travel	Xining
Beijing Capital Airlines	Nanjing, Yinchuan
China Eastern Airlines	Shanghai–Pudong
China Express Airlines	Chengdu–Tianfu, Chongqing, Guiyang, Hohhot, Kunming, Nanjing, Sanya, Shenyang, Tianjin, Xi'an, Zhengzhou
China Southern Airlines	Guangzhou, Shenzhen
Tianjin Airlines	Dalian, Lanzhou
XiamenAir	Changsha, Fuzhou

== See also ==
- List of airports in China
- List of the busiest airports in China
