= Barkol Dahe Airport =

Barkol Dahe Airport 巴里坤大河机场
- IATA: DHH; ICAO: ZWLK

Summary
- Airport type: Public
- Serves: Barkol, Xinjiang, China
- Coordinates: 43.7546°N 93.1311°E

Map
- Location of airport in Xinjiang

Runways
Direction	Length		Surface
Direction	m	ft	Surface
13/31	3,000	9,843

Barkol Dahe Airport
- Simplified Chinese: 巴里坤大河机场
- Traditional Chinese: 巴里坤大河機場
Transcriptions
Standard Mandarin
- Hanyu Pinyin: Bālǐkūn Dàhé Jīchǎng

Balikun (Barkol) Dahe Airport (Chinese: 巴里坤大河机场) is an airport located in Barkol county of Hami city in Xinjiang autonomous region of Northwestern China. Barkol Dahe Airport opened on July 15, 2025.

== Airlines and destinations ==
Airlines	Destinations
Chengdu Airlines	Changsha, Chengdu–Tianfu, Chongqing, Fuzhou, Kashgar, Lanzhou, Xi'an, Zhengzhou
China United Airlines	Beijing-Daxing

== See also ==
- List of airports in China
- List of the busiest airports in China
