= Tumxuk Tangwangcheng Airport =

Tumxuk Tangwangcheng Airport 图木舒克唐王城机场
- IATA: TWC; ICAO: ZWTS

Summary
- Airport type: Public
- Serves: Tumxuk, Xinjiang, China
- Opened: 26 December 2018
- Elevation AMSL: 1,090 m / 3,576 ft
- Coordinates: 39°53′17.30″N 79°13′54.88″E

Map
- Location of airport in Xinjiang

Runways
Direction	Length		Surface
Direction	m	ft	Surface
02/20	2,600	8,530	Concrete

Statistics (2025)
- Passengers: 451,920
- Aircraft movements: 7,044
- Cargo (metric tons): 402.5

Tumxuk Tangwangcheng Airport
- Simplified Chinese: 图木舒克唐王城机场
- Traditional Chinese: 圖木舒克唐王城機場
Transcriptions
Standard Mandarin
- Hanyu Pinyin: Túmùshūkè Tángwángchéng Jīchǎng

Tumushuke (Tumxuk) Tangwangcheng Airport (IATA: TWC, ICAO: ZWTS) is an airport serving the city of Tumxuk (Tumushuke) in Xinjiang Uyghur Autonomous Region of northwestern China. It is located 15 kilometres (9.3 mi) from the city center, and also serves the nearby counties of Maralbexi and Kalpin.

== History ==
The airport received approval from the State Council of China and the Central Military Commission in January 2014. Construction officially began on 12 March 2016, with a total investment of 631 million yuan, and the airport was opened on 26 December 2018 with an inaugural China Southern Airlines flight from Ürümqi. It is the second airport built and managed by the Xinjiang Production and Construction Corps, and the 21st civil airport in Xinjiang.

Since the airport runway was no longer long enough to meet the needs of long-haul routes, its 2,600-meter runway needed to be extended northward to 3,000 meters. On March 30, 2021, the feasibility study for the expansion and renovation project of Tumushuke Tangwangcheng Airport was approved.

During the runway extension project, part of the runway was closed, reducing the usable length from 2,600 meters to 2,300 meters. To ensure the safe operation of aircraft during the project, temporary flight procedures were developed, and a verification test flight was conducted in July using a Boeing B737-800 aircraft.

On September 7, 2021, the preliminary design and budget review of the expansion and renovation project of Tumxuk Tangwangcheng Airport were completed. On October 15, 2021, the preliminary design of the project was jointly approved by the Civil Aviation Administration of Xinjiang and the Development and Reform Commission of Xinjiang Production and Construction Corps. In December, 2021, the expansion and renovation project of the airport was officially started.

On May 26, 2023, the expansion and renovation project of the airport passed the final acceptance inspection. On August 2, 2023, a field test flight was conducted to verify the extended runway. This test flight was carried out by China Southern Airlines flight CZ5275. On September 1, 2023, the project passed industry acceptance test. On December 27, the expansion and renovation project of Tumushuke Tangwangcheng Airport was put into use, extending the runway to 3,000 meters and adding 3 Category C aircraft stands. In order to repaint new markings for the runway and apron, flights were suspended for a week before the extended runway was officially put into use.

== Facilities ==
The airport occupies an area of 141.93 hectares (350.7 acres). It has a runway that is 2,600 metres (8,500 ft) long and 45 metres (148 ft) wide, and a 5,880-square-metre (63,300 sq ft) terminal building with 2 aerobridges.

== Airlines and destinations ==
Airlines	Destinations
9 Air	Guangzhou, Xi'an
Air China	Aksu, Beijing–Capital
Chengdu Airlines	Chengdu–Tianfu, Fuzhou, Turpan, Zhengzhou
China Express Airlines	Aksu, Aral, Kashgar, Korla, Shache, Shihezi, Yining
China Southern Airlines	Ürümqi
Loong Air	Chengdu–Tianfu, Hangzhou
Tianjin Airlines	Ürümqi

== See also ==
- List of airports in China
- List of the busiest airports in China
