= Qitai Jiangbulake Airport =

Airport in Xinjiang, China

Qitai Jiangbulake Airport 奇台江布拉克机场
- IATA: JBK; ICAO: ZWQT

Summary
- Airport type: Public
- Serves: Changji, Xinjiang, China
- Coordinates: 44.1830°N 89.5945°E

Map
- Location of airport in Xinjiang

Runways
Direction	Length		Surface
Direction	m	ft	Surface
09/27	2,800	9,186

Qitai Jiangbulake Airport
- Simplified Chinese: 奇台江布拉克机场
- Traditional Chinese: 奇台江布拉克機場
Transcriptions
Standard Mandarin
- Hanyu Pinyin: Qítái Jiāngbùlākè Jīchǎng

Qitai Jiangbulake Airport (IATA: JBK, ICAO: ZWQT) is an airport in Qitai County, Changji Prefecture, Xinjiang, China. The airport opened on August 8, 2024.

== Airlines and destinations ==
Airlines	Destinations
Air Guilin	Jinan, Taiyuan
Beijing Capital Airlines	Beijing–Daxing, Yinchuan
Chengdu Airlines	Aksu, Changsha, Chengdu–Tianfu, Fuzhou, Kashgar, Lanzhou, Xi'an, Yining, Zhengzhou
China Express Airlines	Aksu, Hami
Fuzhou Airlines	Fuzhou

== See also ==
- List of airports in China
- List of the busiest airports in China
