= Aral Talim Airport =

Aral Talim Airport 阿拉尔塔里木机场
- IATA: ACF; ICAO: ZWAL

Summary
- Airport type: Public
- Serves: Aral, Xinjiang, China
- Opened: 2022
- Coordinates: 40.43°N 81.27°E

Map
- Location of airport in Xinjiang

Runways
Direction	Length		Surface
Direction	m	ft	Surface
01/19	2,800	9,186

Statistics (2025)
- Passengers: 511,162
- Aircraft movements: 8,205
- Cargo (metric tons): 545.6

Aral Talim Airport
- Simplified Chinese: 阿拉尔塔里木机场
- Traditional Chinese: 阿拉爾塔里木機場
Transcriptions
Standard Mandarin
- Hanyu Pinyin: Ālāěr Tǎlǐmù Jīchǎng

Alaer Talimu Airport (Aral Talim/Tarim Airport) (IATA: ACF, ICAO: ZWAL) is an airport in Aral, Xinjiang, China. It is located in Tanan, 12 km south from Aral. The airport opened on June 16, 2022.

== History ==
In 2017, Alar City began planning the construction of a civilian airport.

On January 19, 2018, the site selection for Alar Civil Airport was determined, with the site located in the 12th Regiment of the First Division of Alar City, in the southern part of Alar City, at the intersection of the Ahe Highway and the Asa Highway. The construction area is approximately 166.65 hectares, and the straight-line distance from the center of Alar City is 12 km.

On August 14, the evaluation meeting of the pre-feasibility study report of Alar Civil Branch Airport, organized by China International Engineering Consulting Corporation, was held in Beijing. On December 20, Alar Airport Construction Co., Ltd. was officially established.

On January 19, 2020, the State Council and the Central Military Commission approved the establishment of the Alar Civil Airport project. On January 27, the project received the pre-feasibility study approval from the National Development and Reform Commission. On March 18, Alar Airport Construction Co., Ltd. issued a public notice soliciting opinions on the environmental impact assessment of the new Xinjiang Alar Civil Airport project. From March 31 to April 1, the review meeting for the feasibility study report of Alar Civil Airport was held. On June 16, the feasibility study report of Alar Civil Airport project passed the review of the Civil Aviation Administration of China and was approved for construction. On September 27, the project received the feasibility study approval from the National Development and Reform Commission. On November 27, the overall planning review meeting for the Alar Civil Airport project was held in Alar City. On December 22, the project received the overall planning approval from the Civil Aviation Administration of Xinjiang.

On February 7, 2021, the project received approval for the preliminary design and budget from the Civil Aviation Administration of Xinjiang. On March 18, the Alar Civil Airport officially started construction with a total investment of RMB 886 million. On September 17, the airport construction works were completed. On October 21, the airport project passed the pre-completion acceptance. On October 28, the airport calibration flight officially started. On November 30, the calibration was completed, and the airport passed all tests and certified to meet the civil aviation operation standards.

On January 20, 2022, Tarim Airport passed the civil aviation professional engineering completion acceptance. On January 26, the Alar Tarim Airport successfully completed its test flight, operated by a Boeing 737-800 aircraft from China Southern Airlines. From February 28 to March 3, the airport project passed the industry acceptance organized by the Civil Aviation Administration of Xinjiang. On May 25, the Civil Aviation Administration of China officially issued license to the airport. On June 16, Alar Tarim Airport officially opened for operation. The maiden flight was operated by China Southern Airlines flight CZ5565, which used a Boeing 737-800 aircraft to depart from Urumqi Diwopu International Airport and arrive at Tarim Airport.

Since its opening in June 2022, Alar Tarim Airport has seen its passenger throughput increase year by year. Faced with the ever-growing volume of air traffic, the airport's expansion and renovation were imperative. This expansion and renovation project included extending the runway by 400 meters, bringing the total runway length to 3200 meters; renovation of the terminal building; and expansion of the apron, adding four new Category C aircraft stands. On August 20, 2024, a test flight verifying the possibility of expanding and renovating the airport without halting its operations. The expansion and renovation project was started after the verification flight was successfully completed. On January 22, 2026, all key indicators of the expansion and renovation project of Alar Tarim Airport passed industry acceptance and met the usage requirements, and it was officially put into use.

== Facilities ==
Aral Talim Airport is a category 4C airport. It has a runway 2,800 meters long and 45 meters wide, a 4,509-square-meter terminal building and 6 gates. It is capable of handling 300,000 passengers, 1,100 tons of cargo, and 3,200 flights a year.

== Airlines and destinations ==
Airlines	Destinations
Chengdu Airlines	Altay, Changsha, Chengdu–Tianfu, Fuzhou, Kashgar, Shihezi, Turpan, Yining
China Express Airlines	Aksu, Bole, Hotan, Kashgar, Korla, Shihezi, Tumxuk, Yining
Loong Air	Chengdu–Tianfu, Hangzhou, Zhengzhou
Tianjin Airlines	Lanzhou, Ürümqi

== See also ==
- List of airports in China
- List of the busiest airports in China
