= Fuzhou Changle International Airport =

Airport serving Fuzhou, Fujian, China

Fuzhou Changle International Airport 福州长乐国际机场
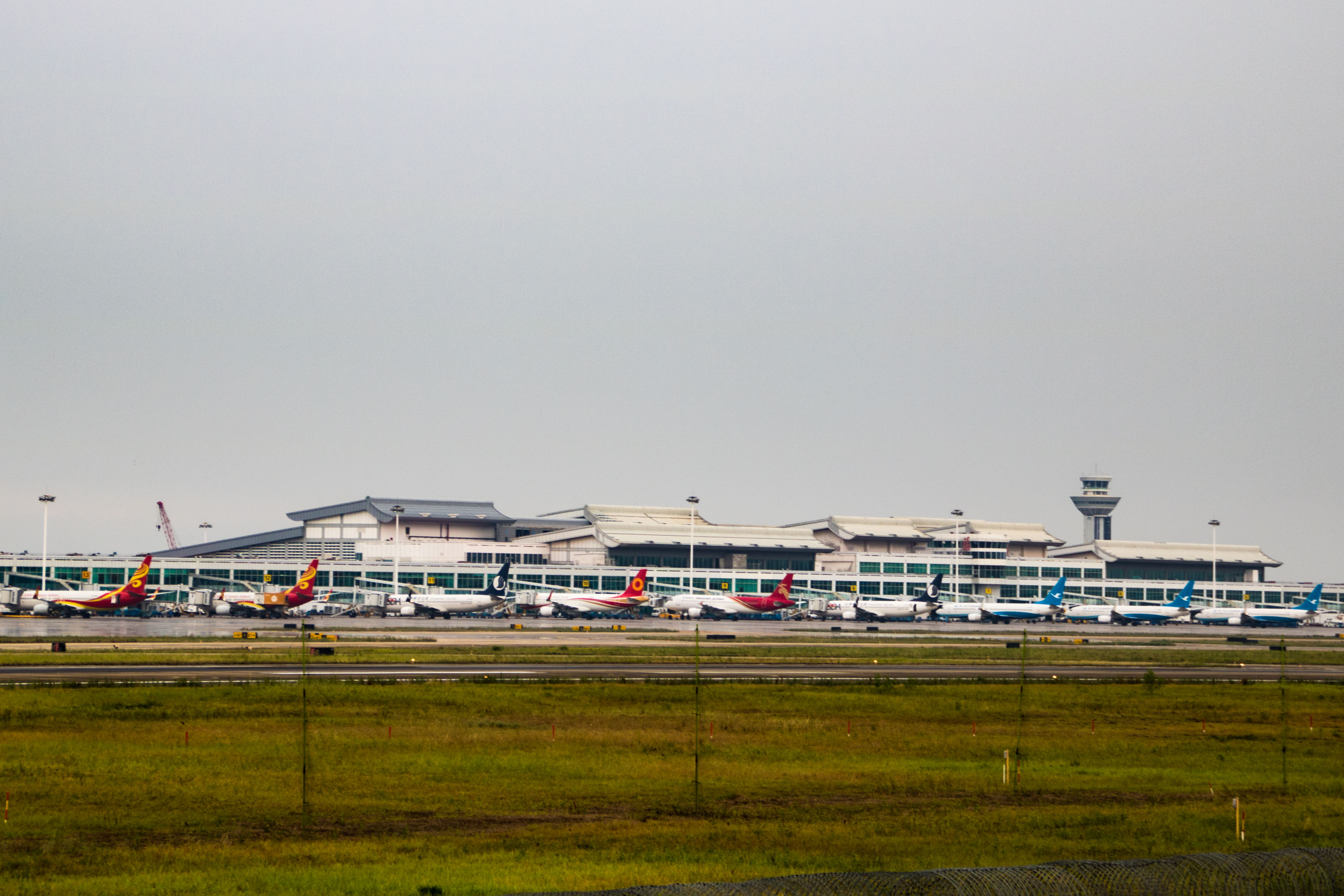
- Fuzhou airport terminal
- IATA: FOC; ICAO: ZSFZ

Summary
- Airport type: Public
- Operator: Yuanxiang (Fuzhou) International Airport Co., Ltd
- Serves: Fuzhou
- Location: Zhanggang, Changle, Fuzhou, Fujian, China
- Opened: 23 June 1997; 29 years ago
- Hub for: Fuzhou Airlines; XiamenAir
- Elevation AMSL: 14 m (46 ft)
- Coordinates: 25°56′06″N 119°39′48″E
- Website: www.fuzhouairport.com.cn

Maps
- CAAC airport chart
- Location in Fujian Location in China

Runways
Direction	Length		Surface
Direction	m	ft	Surface
03L/21R	3,609	11,841	Concrete
03R/21L	3,600	11,811	Concrete

Statistics (2025)
- Passengers: 16,117,180
- Aircraft movements: 112,326
- Cargo (tonnes): 122,474.8
- Source: China's busiest airports by passenger traffic

Fuzhou Changle International Airport
- Simplified Chinese: 福州长乐国际机场
- Traditional Chinese: 福州長樂國際機場
Transcriptions
Standard Mandarin
- Hanyu Pinyin: Fúzhōu Chánglè Guójì Jīchǎng
Eastern Min
- Fuzhou BUC: Hók-ciŭ Diòng-lŏ̤h Guók-gĭa Gi-chòng

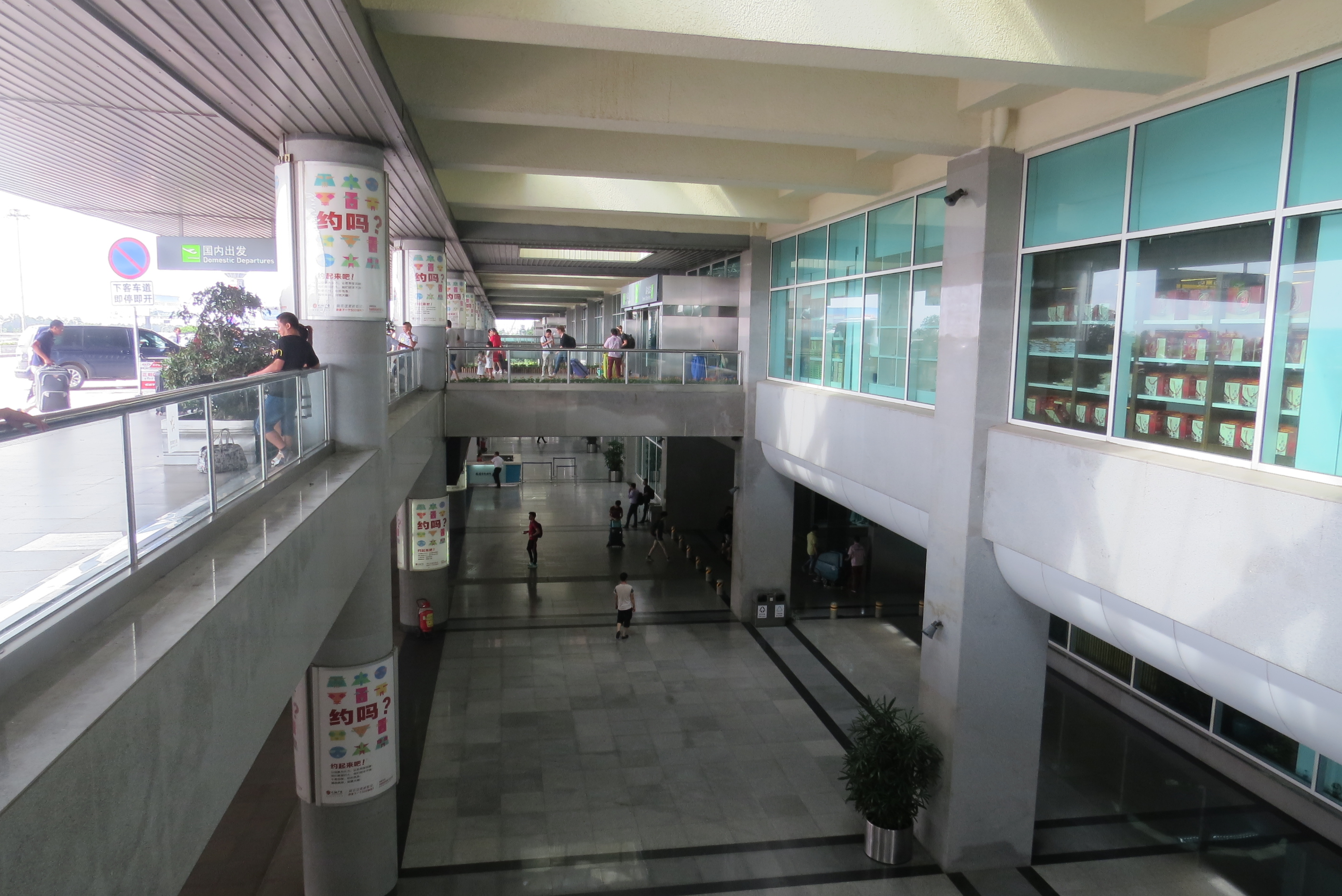
Upper level departures and lower level arrivals

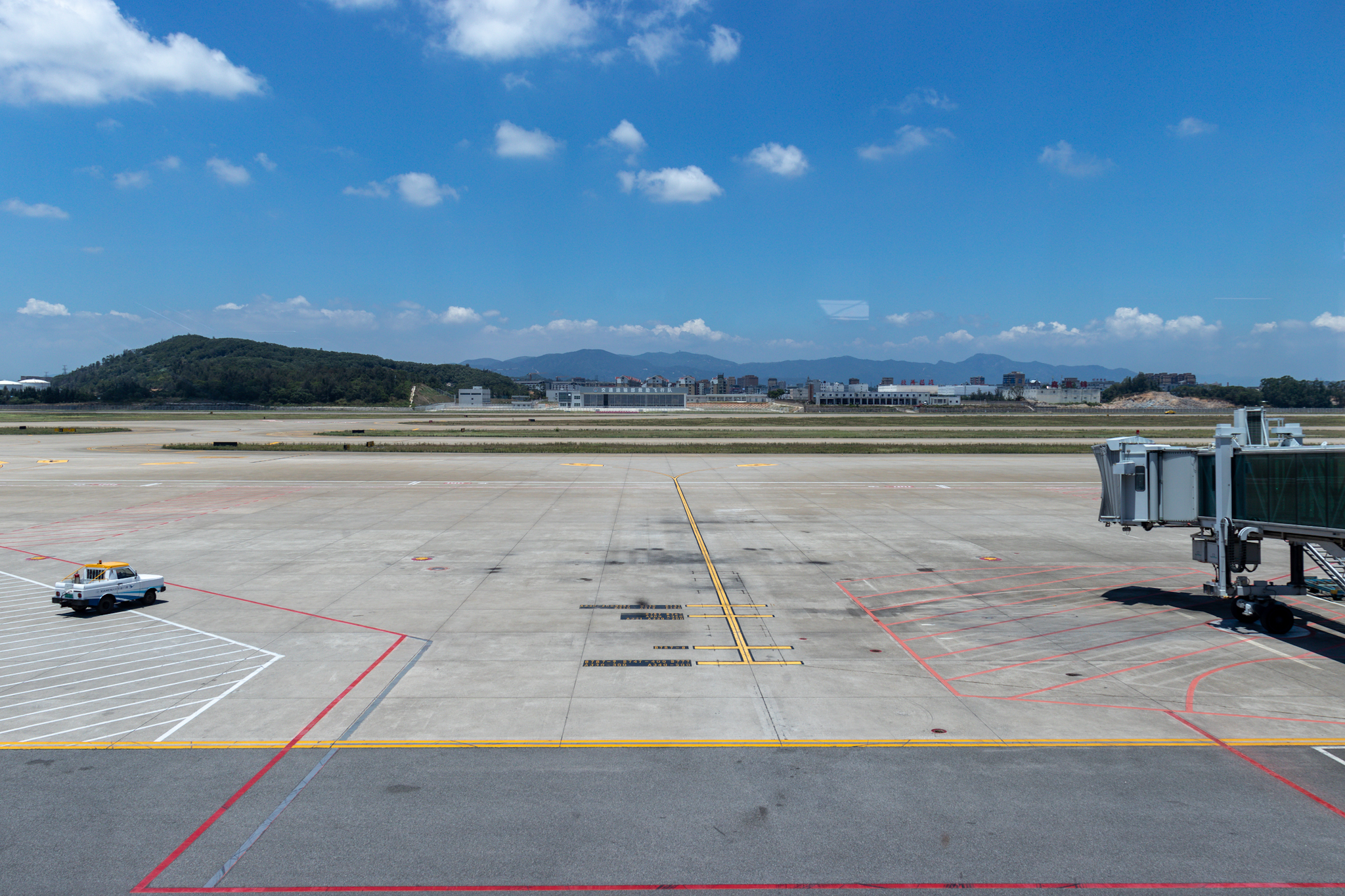
The apron view at Fuzhou Changle International Airport

Fuzhou Changle International Airport (IATA: FOC, ICAO: ZSFZ) is an international airport serving Fuzhou, the capital of East China's Fujian province. It was inaugurated on 23 June 1997 after being approved to start construction by the state council in 1992. The current handling capacity is approximately 6.5 million people annually.

The airport is located near the shore of the Taiwan Strait in Zhanggang Subdistrict, Changle, about 50 km (31 mi) east of central Fuzhou. The airport is also a major hub for the namesake Fuzhou Airlines and XiamenAir.

According to the Civil Aviation Administration of China, in 2025, Fuzhou Changle International Airport recorded 112,326 flight take offs and landings, and 16.117 million passenger movements, representing a year-on-year increases of 3.9% and 5.3% respectively.

== History ==
The earliest airport in Fuzhou was Yixu Airport, which at the time operated as a dual‑use military and civil airport. It opened to civil aviation on 1 December 1974. Four years after the start of civil operations, Yixu Airport served only three routes, with an annual passenger throughput of just 88,000. The airport was very small: its runway was only 2,200 meters long, and it had no taxiways or connecting taxi routes. Aircraft had to taxi directly on the runway to reach the apron after landing. Large aircraft such as the Boeing 767 could take off and land only with reduced payload. Because of the limited number of flights and low passenger capacity, tickets were difficult to obtain.

In 1996, with the construction and opening of Fuzhou Changle International Airport, Yixu Airport completed its historical mission and reverted to exclusive military use. The newly built Fuzhou Changle International Airport, located more than 40 kilometers from the city center, was the first large modern international airport in China to be fully financed by a local government. Although the new airport initially had only one runway—3,600 meters long and 45 meters wide—a 137,000‑square‑meter terminal building, and 24 aircraft stands, its passenger‑handling capacity was far greater than that of Yixu Airport, with a designed annual capacity of 6.5 million passengers.

The Fujian provincial government once hoped that the new airport would eventually reach the standard of Singapore Changi Airport. However, after Fuzhou Changle International Airport officially opened in 1997, it quickly became clear that this ambition was unrealistic. In its early years, the airport suffered from low passenger volumes, which resulted in substantial financial losses and placed considerable pressure on its operations.

During the period from 1997 to 2022, the airport's operational performance fell far short of the original expectations, its debt reached more than 3 billion yuan in the first 4 years, and the airport fell into the predicament of insolvency. Persistent losses caused by insufficient passenger traffic made it clear that a more professional and modernized management structure was needed to improve efficiency and expand the route network.

In 2003, Fuzhou Changle International Airport underwent a major restructuring. In line with national civil aviation reforms and Fujian Province's development strategy, the airport abandoned its previous model of being solely funded and managed by the Fuzhou municipal government and began transitioning toward a shareholding and group‑based operational system. In the years that followed, provincial‑level capital—such as the Fujian Investment & Development Group—was introduced, diversifying the airport's ownership structure and strengthening its positioning as a modern international gateway. In 2003, the airport's management was taken over by Xiamen International Airport Group. By November, Singapore and Osaka were the first international flights out of Changle Airport.

Three years later, beginning in 2005, Changle Airport achieved a remarkable turnaround from loss to profit. In the first year after restructuring, losses were reduced by 45 million yuan; in the second year, by another 30 million; and in the third year (2005), the airport recorded a profit of 5.95 million yuan. This restructuring laid a solid institutional foundation for the airport's subsequent development. It enabled Changle Airport to grow into Fujian's primary aviation hub, expand its route network, increase passenger throughput, and eventually launch its second‑phase expansion project—marking its transformation from a locally run airport into a regionally managed aviation hub.

By the end of 2005, the total debt borne by the Group on behalf of Changle Airport had fallen from 1.73 billion yuan to 940 million yuan. Passenger throughput reached 3.39 million, and cargo and mail volume reached 74,000 tons. In the future, Changle Airport and Xiamen Airport are expected to form two major aviation hubs in the north and south of Fujian Province.

The terminal was expanded and upgraded twice in 2011 and 2018. On 30 November 2015, the passenger throughput of Fuzhou Changle International Airport surpassed 10 million for the first time, marking its official entry into the ranks of China's large airports.

In February 2017, XiamenAir operated Changle's first direct route to North America, with a Boeing 787-9 service to New York–JFK. On 11 December 2018, a second intercontinental route to Paris–Charles de Gaulle was launched.

=== Ongoing expansion ===
In September 2019, the National Development and Reform Commission approved a second expansion project. The project includes the following construction works:

- Construction of a 3600m x 60m second runway and relevant taxiway
- Construction of a 255,000 m^{2} second terminal
- Construction of 60 new aircraft stands, eight cargo aircraft stands and relevant supporting facilities
- Construction of a second air traffic control tower and a new 9000m² air traffic management centre
- Reconstruction of the existing air traffic control tower and the air traffic management centre
- An 81,600 square meter comprehensive transportation center and various supporting facilities.

At the end May 2021, the second phase of airport expansion project was launched.

The airport targets 36 million passengers and 450,000 tonnes cargo per year by 2030 once the project has been completed.

On 11 June 2026, the new second runway (Runway 03R/21L) was officially put into operation. Changle Airport was upgraded to from a 4E to a 4F class airport, enabling the airport to accommodate the largest widebody aircraft such as the Airbus A380. This marks it as the first 4F class airport that is certified in Fujian province and also the 17th overall in China. XiamenAir's inaugural flight from Fuzhou to Amsterdam was the first flight to take off from the new runway.

On 16 September 2026 at 5:00am, Terminal 2 was officially put into operation.

In August 2027, it is planned for the new Fuzhou Changle Airport Integrated Transportation Center (GTC) to open, acting as a hub between Terminals 1 and 2, while also accommodating a range of upcoming subway and high speed rail lines, airport shuttles and private transport.

== Terminals ==
Fuzhou Changle International Airport has two passenger terminals in service.

View of Terminal 1

=== Terminal 1 ===
Terminal 1 opened back in 1997, and remained as the only terminal of Changle Airport, serving all domestic and international flights until 16 September 2026.

In 2010, Changle Airport launched its first expansion project. A new cargo area and the renovation and expansion of Terminal 1 opened on 29 December 2011. Additional waiting areas in both domestic and international departure halls were added, with new check-in counters, security checkpoints and baggage carousels also added. The expansion also expanded the apron to 300,000 square metres, by increasing aircraft parking stands from 24 to 36, and increasing the number of jetbridges from 9 to 16. Through this, maximum annual passenger capacity increased from 6.5 million to over 13 million passengers.

This was done to combat the lack of parking positions for aircraft, and to increase demand for flights to and from Taiwan.

In 2014, the airport launched its second expansion in order to accommodate the launch of Fuzhou Airlines, while the apron and taxiway area were set to be increased by 183,000 square metres, along with 17 extra aircraft stands through extending the north and south wings.

The second expansion opened in stages from April to 28 November 2018. A new air‑traffic‑control tower was completed. Diagonal concourses were added to both sides of the ends of the terminal, adding 26 new gates, where terminal space was added by 79,000 square metres. The southern diagonal concourse will primarily serve as the international departure area, while the northern diagonal concourse will serve domestic flights. The main terminal building was expanded by 96 metres eastwards, with the expanded check-in hall catering for XiamenAir domestic flights and all international flights. The existing building was upgraded to primarily changed serve as a general domestic check-in area. This made Changle Airport capable of handling over 25 million passengers annually.

Currently, Terminal 1 now only serves domestic flights by other Chinese airlines. The former international gates and facilities at Terminal 1 will be removed and converted to handle domestic flights.

=== Terminal 2 ===
Terminal 2 opened on 16 September 2026. The opening of this terminal means that Changle Airport is capable of handling 36 million passengers per year. It is now used by all Xiamen Airlines, Hebei Airlines and Jiangxi Air flights which had relocated all their flights here. In addition, all international, Hong Kong, Macau and Taiwan flights had relocated here. Spring Airlines' international flights to and from Bangkok–Suvarnabhumi were also moved to here on the same day.

The construction area for the expansion was approximately 480,000 square metres. The new terminal incorporates architectural designs across Fuzhou. Elements of Sanfang Qixiang have been implemented into its design, such as the saddle-shaped walls. Banyan trees and jasmine flowers are natural elements that have also been integrated. The roof represents ocean waves, while the atrium and skylights resemble water ripples, creating a 'treasure vase' motif. Terminal 2 will build on Fuzhou's role as a Maritime Silk Road hub.

== Location ==
Fuzhou Changle International Airport is located at 25°56´ north latitude and 119°39´ east longitude. It is surrounded by the East China Sea on three sides. The surrounding area of the airport is flat, but it extends southwest and northeast, surrounded by mountains.

== Ground transport ==
=== Bus ===
The airport passenger terminal has a number of fixed shuttle routes to Fuzhou city and surrounding areas. Opening hours are from 4:30 to 22:30.

=== Highway ===
Many expressways directly reach Changle International Airport, such as Shenhai Expressway, Fuyin Expressway, and Airport Expressway.

Airport Station on Fuzhou Metro's Binhai Express line

=== Subway ===
Fuzhou Metro's Binhai Express line provides a direct link from Wenling station to Fuzhou Railway Station in the city, via Changle Airport. It opened at 2:00 pm on 29 September 2025, with future plans for an interchange with Line 6 at Binhai CBD station near the airport.

== Climate ==
Fuzhou Changle International Airport has a subtropical maritime climate, with the northeast monsoon prevailing in the winter half year and the southwest monsoon in the summer half year. There will be continuous rainy weather in spring. Due to typhoon and subtropical high pressure, there are often strong winds and heavy rains in summer. There will be continuously sunny weather in winter.

In addition to the southerly winds in the south of July, Changle Airport is dominated by the northerly winds in the other 11 months, and there are mountain hills in the west of the Changle Plain.

Typical climate characteristics of Changle Airport are: (1), cloudy, low cloud base; (2) abundant rainfall, large number of rainy days; (3) fast wind speed, large number of windy days, and the annual average wind speed is 4.5 m/s (4) the airport has less thunderstorms, but the airport airspace has frequent thunderstorms (5) well marked sea-land breeze effect (6) humid air, the annual average relative humidity is 75%.

== Airlines and destinations ==
=== Passenger ===
Airlines	Destinations
9 Air	Guiyang
Aero Dili	Dili
Air Cambodia	Phnom Penh, Tokyo–Narita
Air China	Beijing–Capital, Chengdu–Shuangliu, Chengdu–Tianfu, Chongqing, Dalian
Air Macau	Macau
Beijing Capital Airlines	Dali, Sanya, Shenyang
Cathay Pacific	Hong Kong
Chengdu Airlines	Aral, Barkol, Chengdu–Shuangliu, Chongqing, Hotan, Jinan, Qitai, Shihezi, Tacheng, Tumxuk, Wuhan, Yining, Zhengzhou
China Eastern Airlines	Chengdu–Tianfu, Hefei, Kunming, Nanjing, Qingdao, Shanghai–Hongqiao, Shanghai–Pudong, Singapore, Taiyuan, Wuhan, Xi'an, Yichang
China Express Airlines	Jining, Linyi, Xuzhou
China Southern Airlines	Beijing–Daxing, Guangzhou, Ürümqi, Zhengzhou
China United Airlines	Beijing–Daxing, Foshan
Chongqing Airlines	Chongqing
Colorful Guizhou Airlines	Bijie, Xingyi, Yibin
Fuzhou Airlines	Aksu, Changchun, Changsha, Changzhi, Chengdu–Tianfu, Chongqing, Dalian, Dazhou, Guiyang, Haikou, Harbin, Huai'an, Kunming, Nanning, Qitai, Qingdao, Tianjin, Xi'an, Zhangjiajie, Zhengzhou, Zhoushan
Hainan Airlines	Beijing–Capital, Chongqing, Haikou, Shijiazhuang, Taiyuan, Ürümqi, Wuhan, Xi'an
Juneyao Airlines	Shanghai–Pudong
Korean Air	Seoul–Incheon
Lion Air	Charter: Manado
Loong Air	Changzhou, Dalian
Lucky Air	Kunming
Mandarin Airlines	Taipei–Songshan
Qingdao Airlines	Changchun, Harbin, Tianjin, Yantai
Ruili Airlines	Kunming, Liuzhou, Mangshi, Xishuangbanna, Zhanjiang
Scoot	Singapore
Shandong Airlines	Beijing–Capital, Jinan, Qingdao, Ürümqi, Zhuhai
Shanghai Airlines	Changchun, Kuala Lumpur - International, Shanghai–Hongqiao
Shenzhen Airlines	Nanning, Shenyang
Sichuan Airlines	Chengdu–Shuangliu, Chengdu–Tianfu, Tianjin, Chongqing
Spring Airlines	Dalian, Dongying, Lanzhou, Shenyang, Shijiazhuang, Yancheng, Yangzhou
Suparna Airlines	Guiyang, Nanning
Urumqi Air	Luoyang, Ordos, Ürümqi, Zhengzhou
West Air	Anqing, Chongqing, Zhengzhou
XiamenAir	Amsterdam, Beihai, Beijing–Daxing Changchun, Changsha, Changzhou, Chengdu–Tianfu, Chongqing, Dalian, Guangzhou, Guilin, Guiyang, Guyuan, Haikou, Hanoi, Harbin, Ho Chi Minh City, Hohhot, Hong Kong, Jakarta–Soekarno-Hatta, Jinan, Jingzhou, Jinzhou, Kaohsiung, Kota Kinabalu, Kuala Lumpur–International, Kunming, Lanzhou, Luzhou, Macau, Manila, Mianyang, Nanjing, Nanning, Nanchong, Nantong, New York–JFK, Phnom Penh, Qiqihar, Qingdao, Sanya, Seoul–Incheon, Shanghai–Hongqiao, Shenyang, Singapore, Surabaya, Taipei–Songshan, Taipei–Taoyuan, Taiyuan, Tianjin, Tokyo–Narita, Ürümqi, Vientiane, Wuhan, Wuxi, Xiamen, Xi'an, Xining, Xishuangbanna, Yan'an, Yanji, Yinchuan, Yuncheng, Zhengzhou, Zhuhai

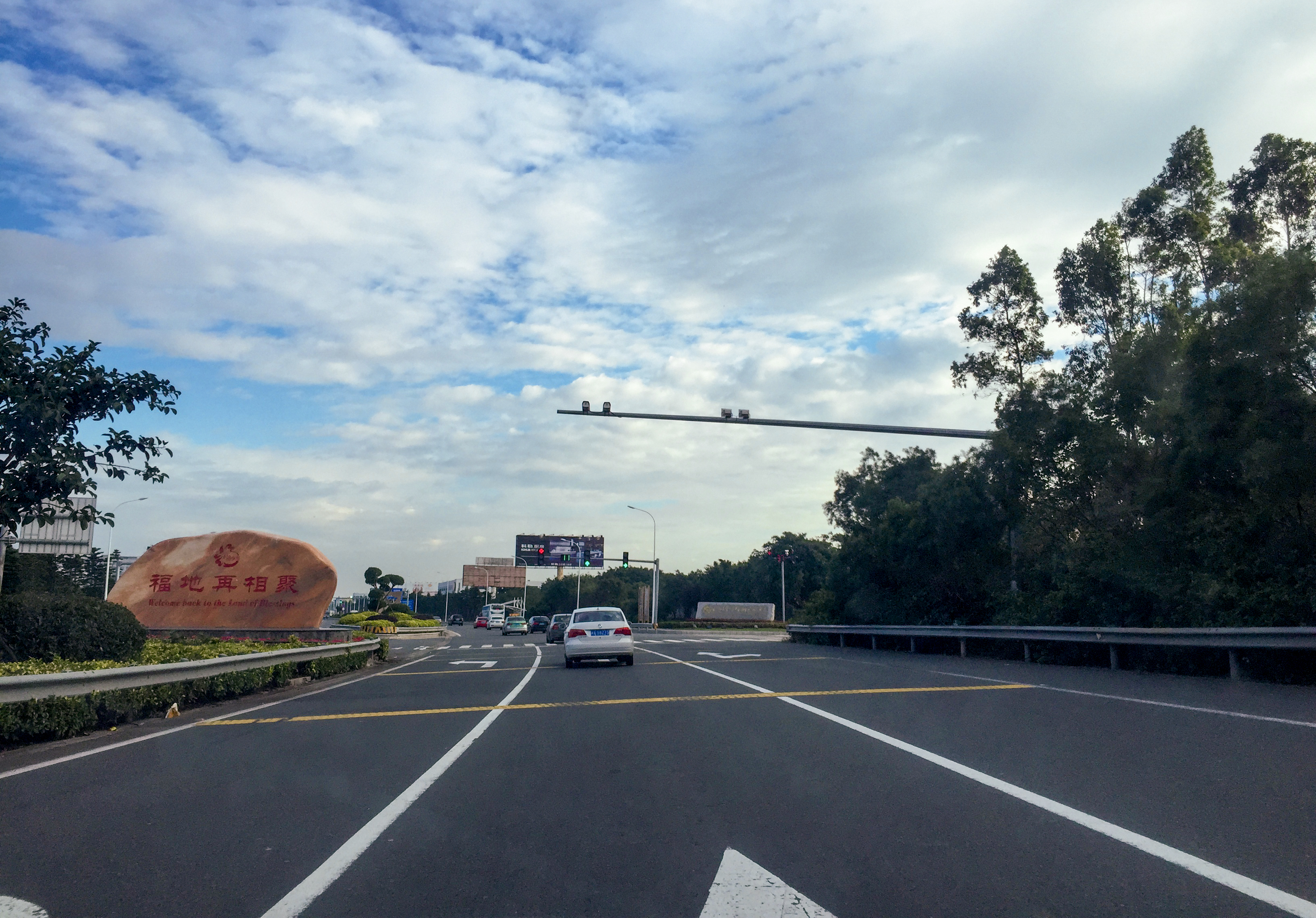
"Welcome back to the Land of Blessings" (福地再相聚), the sign reads, indicating the airport is right ahead.

=== Cargo ===
Airlines	Destinations
China Postal Airlines	Nanjing, Taipei–Taoyuan, Xiamen

== Delays ==
=== Statistics ===
In 2017, the total throughput of Changle Airport ranked 28 in China, carrying passengers up to 12,469,235 throughout the year.

In the latest airport punctuality rate ranking in October 2018, Changle Airport ranked 16, which is 83.19%, with an average delay of 23 minutes. Delays of more than 60 minutes are rare, only 2.54%.

=== Causes ===
==== Thunderstorm ====
Aviation and weather are closely connected. Thunderstorms are currently recognized as one of the most important weather phenomena that seriously affect the safety of airport and efficiency of flights. When flying in thunderstorms area, passengers and crew may encounter dangerous weather such as wind shear, bumps, hail, downburst, etc.

In recent years, Fuzhou Changle International Airport has experienced a rapid growth for flight delays and return flight due to thunderstorms. In 2016, the number of flights affected by thunderstorms at Changle Airport was 729, taking up 38.4% of the total number of flights affected by the weather. The annual average thunderstorm of Fuzhou Changle International Airport is 27.3d which is considerably frequent and has a greater impact on flight. Thunderstorms vary greatly from year to year, and thunderstorms may occur throughout the year. As the temperature rises, thunderstorms frequency begin to increase.

The main activity period of thunderstorms at Fuzhou Airport is from March to September. Thunderstorms appear most frequent in summer, with an average number of days of 13.5 days, accounting for 49.5 percent of the total number of thunderstorms in the year.

Compared to other months of the year, the thunderstorms in June showed the highest number, with an average of 5.1d. Most are dry thunderstorms and are not prone to rainfall.

Thunder mainly concentrated in the afternoon to the middle of the night, with the highest frequency occurring at 17:00.

Thunderstorms may occur in all directions of Fuzhou Airport, among them, west direction has highest frequency, followed by the northwest and southwest directions. This is because the eastern part of the airport is the ocean, the west is the mountainous area, and the convection over the mountains is stronger than the ocean.

==== Visibility ====
The average visibility in the first half of the year is less than 1000 meters. The number of days is significantly higher than that in the second half, accounting for 83% of the whole year. The visibility of the airport has obvious seasonal differences, showing the worst visibility in spring.

== See also ==
- List of airports in China
- List of the busiest airports in China
