= Meizhou Meixian Airport =

Meizhou Meixian Airport 梅州梅县机场
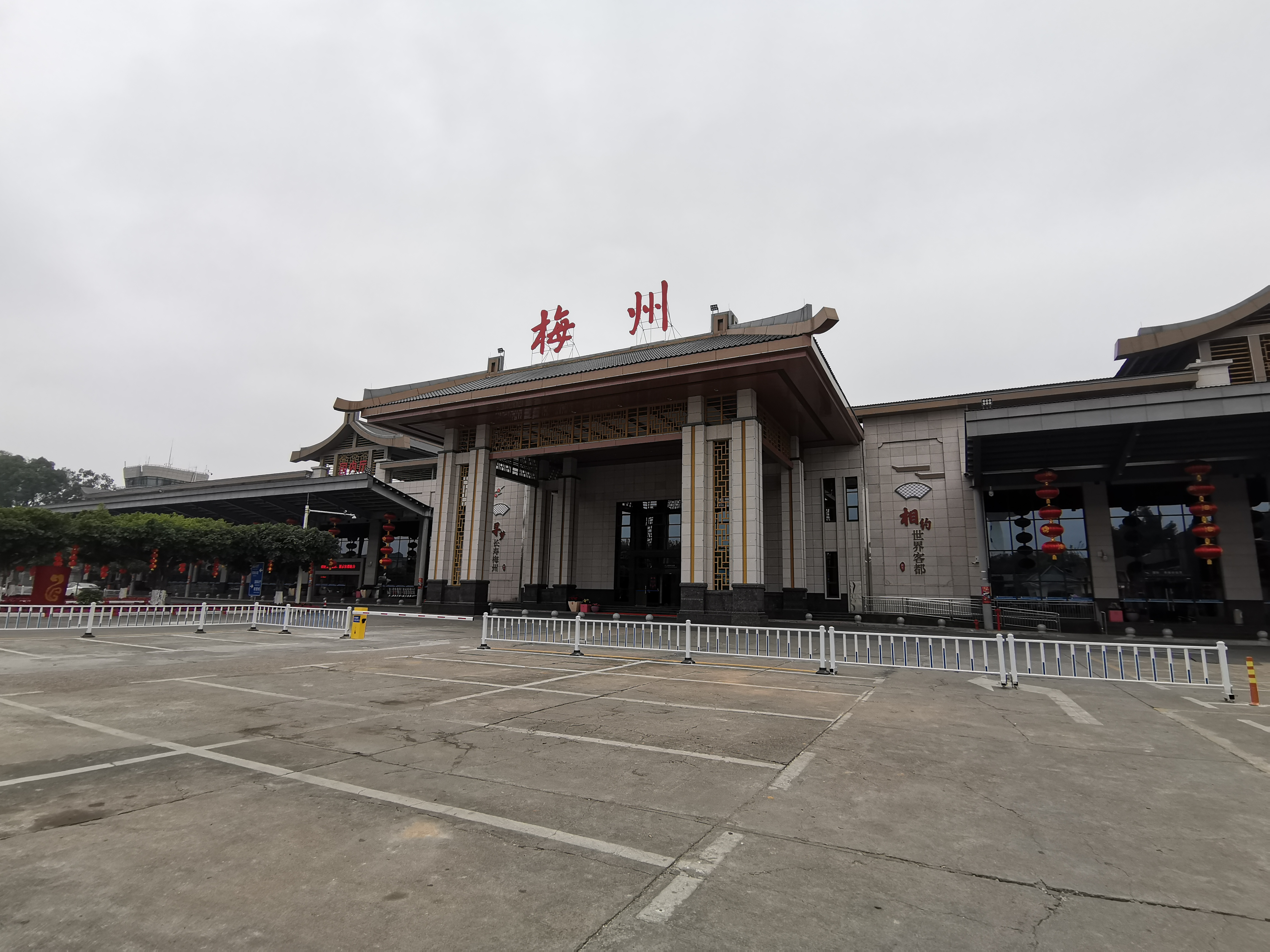
- IATA: MXZ; ICAO: ZGMX

Summary
- Serves: Meizhou, Guangdong, China
- Location: Meijiang District, Meizhou
- Elevation AMSL: 93 m (305 ft)
- Coordinates: 24°15′59″N 116°06′16″E

Map
- Location in Guangdong MXZ/ZGMX (China)

Runways
Direction	Length		Surface
Direction	m	ft	Surface
04/22	2,400	7,874	Asphalt

Statistics (2021)
- Passengers: 440,283
- Aircraft movements: 6,139
- Cargo (metric tons): 187.8

Meizhou Meixian Airport
- Simplified Chinese: 梅州梅县机场
- Traditional Chinese: 梅州梅縣機場
Transcriptions
Standard Mandarin
- Hanyu Pinyin: Méizhōu Méixiàn Jīchǎng

Meizhou Meixian Airport (IATA: MXZ, ICAO: ZGMX), also known as Meizhou Changgangji Airport, is an airport serving the city of Meizhou in Guangdong province, China. It was called Meixian Changgangji Airport until 26 April 2019. Meizhou Meixian Airport commenced operations on 1 September 1987.

== Airlines and destinations ==
Airlines	Destinations
China Eastern Airlines	Shanghai–Pudong
China Express Airlines	Baotou, Changsha
China Southern Airlines	Guangzhou
China United Airlines	Beijing–Daxing

== Ground transportation ==
Meixian Airport is served by the city bus network through routes 3 and 11 (both routes towards downtown Meizhou).

== See also ==
- List of airports in China
