= Yutian Wanfang Airport =

Yutian Wanfang Airport 于田万方机场
- IATA: YTW; ICAO: ZWYT

Summary
- Airport type: Public
- Serves: Yutian County, Xinjiang, China
- Opened: 26 December 2020 (5 years ago)
- Coordinates: 36°48′39″N 81°46′51″E

Map
- Location of airport in Xinjiang

Runways
Direction	Length		Surface
Direction	m	ft	Surface
08/26	3,200	10,499

Statistics (2024)
- Passengers: 243,069
- Aircraft movements: 3,402
- Cargo (metric tons): 135.7

Yutian Wanfang Airport
- Simplified Chinese: 于田万方机场
- Traditional Chinese: 於田萬方機場
Transcriptions
Standard Mandarin
- Hanyu Pinyin: Yútián Wànfāng Jīchǎng

Yutian Wanfang Airport (IATA: YTW, ICAO: ZWYT) is an airport serving the city in Yutian County, Hotan Prefecture, Xinjiang, China. The construction budget is CN¥710 million.

The airport will have a runway that is 3,200 metres (10,500 ft) long and 45 metres (148 ft) wide (class 4C), a 3,000-square-metre (32,000 sq ft) terminal building, and four aircraft parking aprons. It is designed to serve 180,000 passengers and 400 tons of cargo annually. The airport was opened on 26 December 2020, and became the 22nd airport in Xinjiang.

== Airlines and destinations ==
Airlines	Destinations
Chengdu Airlines	Kashgar, Yining
China Express Airlines	Kashgar, Korla
China Southern Airlines	Beijing–Daxing, Ürümqi
Urumqi Air	Guangzhou, Shanghai–Pudong, Ürümqi

== See also ==
- List of airports in China
- List of the busiest airports in China
