= Ili Yining International Airport =

Airport in Yining, Xinjiang, China

Ili Yining International Airport 伊犁伊宁国际机场
- IATA: YIN; ICAO: ZWYN

Summary
- Airport type: Public
- Serves: Yining, Xinjiang, China
- Elevation AMSL: 2,185 ft (666 m)
- Coordinates: 43°57′21″N 81°19′49″E

Map
- Location in Xinjiang YIN/ZWYN (China)

Runways
Direction	Length		Surface
Direction	m	ft	Surface
06/24	2,400	7,874	Asphalt

Statistics (2025)
- Passengers: 3,454,959
- Aircraft movements: 33,129
- Cargo (metric tons): 9,604.8
- Source: CAAC2025

Ili Yining International Airport
- Simplified Chinese: 伊犁伊宁国际机场
- Traditional Chinese: 伊犁伊寧國際機場
Transcriptions
Standard Mandarin
- Hanyu Pinyin: Yīlí Yīníng Guójì Jīchǎng

Ili Yining International Airport (IATA: YIN, ICAO: ZWYN) is an airport located in Yining (Ghulja) City, within the Ili Kazakh Autonomous Prefecture, Xinjiang of the Xinjiang Uygur Autonomous Region. It is operated by Xinjiang Airport Group Co., Ltd. Construction of the original Yining Airport began in 1936, and over the decades it has used several names, including Yili Air Station (伊犁航空站), Civil Aviation Yining Station (民用航空伊宁站), CAAC Ürümqi Administration Yining Airport (民航乌鲁木齐管理局伊宁机场), Xinjiang Airport Group Yining Airport (新疆机场集团有限责任公司伊宁机场) and Xinjiang Airport Group Yining (Nalati) Airport.

In 2009, Yining Airport (伊宁机场) and Nalati Airport (那拉提机场) were placed under unified or joint operation under the Xinjiang Airport Group. The airport is currently undergoing a key transition toward becoming a permanently normalized international aviation port. On June 6, 2024, the Civil Aviation Administration of China approved its renaming to Ili Yining International Airport (Kazakh: ىلە قۇلجا حالىقارالىق اۋەجايى / Іле Құлжа Халықаралық Әуежайы; Simplified Chinese: 伊犁伊宁国际机场).

== History ==
Ili Yining International Airport, originally known as the Yili Air Station, began construction on July 29, 1936. About three months later, on October 31, the airport was fully completed. The airfield measured 950 meters in length and 750 meters in width, and it could accommodate Junkers aircraft carrying three to five passengers. It was among the earliest airports built in Xinjiang. The first-generation terminal building entered service in 1939, and the second-generation terminal building, with a total area of 817 square meters, was put into use in 1958.

In 1984, the third-generation terminal building of Yining Airport was put into use, and the runway was extended to 1,800 meters.

The airport underwent two expansions and renovations in 2005 and 2010, increasing its total assets from 70 million yuan in 2004 to 391 million yuan today. The terminal building has a total construction area of 16,700 square meters, including the fourth-generation terminal that went into operation in July 2011, which has three boarding bridges and a parking lot of 18,000 square meters. It can meet the needs of 1.5 million passengers, 1,100 tons of cargo and mail, and 15,306 takeoffs and landings per year, with a peak hourly takeoff and landing capacity of 10 flights and a peak hourly passenger capacity of 962 passengers.

In August 2016, the State Council approved the opening of Yining Airport to the outside world. In the same year, Yining Airport's passenger throughput exceeded 1 million for the first time. In December 2023, the airport passed national inspection and was officially designated as an aviation port open to international traffic (对外开放的航空口岸).

== Facilities ==
The airport is at an elevation of 2,185 feet (666 m) above mean sea level. It has one runway designated 06/24 which measures 2,400 by 45 metres (7,874 ft × 148 ft).

== Airlines and destinations ==
=== Passenger ===
Airlines	Destinations
Air China	Beijing–Capital, Chengdu–Tianfu, Karamay
Beijing Capital Airlines	Xi'an
Chengdu Airlines	Aksu, Altay, Aral, Bole, Chengdu–Shuangliu, Fuyun, Fuzhou, Hotan, Jinan, Kashgar, Kuqa, Qitai, Shache, Shihezi, Tacheng, Turpan, Wuhan, Yutian
China Eastern Airlines	Chengdu–Tianfu, Nanjing, Ürümqi, Xi'an
China Express Airlines	Aksu, Altay, Aral, Hami, Hotan, Karamay, Kashgar, Korla, Kuqa, Shache, Shihezi, Tumxuk
China Southern Airlines	Beijing–Daxing, Chengdu–Tianfu, Nanjing, Ürümqi, Xi'an
Chongqing Airlines	Chongqing
FlyArystan	Astana; Seasonal: Almaty
Qingdao Airlines	Changsha, Ürümqi
Sichuan Airlines	Chengdu–Tianfu
Spring Airlines	Chengdu–Tianfu, Hefei, Jieyang, Lanzhou, Xi'an, Zhengzhou
Tianjin Airlines	Ürümqi
Urumqi Air	Zhengzhou

=== Cargo ===
Airlines	Destinations
YTO Cargo Airlines	Tashkent

== See also ==
- List of airports in China
