= Shihezi Huayuan Airport =

Shihezi Huayuan Airport 石河子花园机场
- IATA: SHF; ICAO: ZWHZ

Summary
- Airport type: Public
- Location: Shihezi, Xinjiang, China
- Opened: 26 December 2015; 10 years ago
- Coordinates: 44°14′30″N 85°53′28″E

Map
- Location of airport in Xinjiang

Runways
Direction	Length		Surface
Direction	m	ft	Surface
09/27	2,400	7,874	Concrete

Statistics (2025)
- Passengers: 627,933
- Aircraft movements: 27,308
- Cargo (metric tons): 970.6

Shihezi Huayuan Airport
- Simplified Chinese: 石河子花园机场
- Traditional Chinese: 石河子花園機場
Transcriptions
Standard Mandarin
- Hanyu Pinyin: Shíhézi Huãyuán Jīchǎng

Shihezi Huayuan Airport (IATA: SHF, ICAO: ZWHZ) is an airport serving the city of Shihezi in Xinjiang Uygur Autonomous Region, China. It was moved and rebuilt at a new location 15 kilometers southwest of the city center. Construction began on May 24, 2012, after the project received final approval in April 2012. The airport was budgeted to cost 515 million yuan to rebuild. It reopened on 26 December 2015.

== Overview ==
Shihezi Huayuan Airport is 15 kilometers from the center of Shihezi City and 14 kilometers from Shihezi Railway Station. It officially opened to traffic in December 2015. Shihezi Huayuan Airport has a 2,800-meter-long 4C-class civil runway, which can meet the take-off and landing needs of mainstream narrow-body passenger aircraft such as the Boeing 737 series, Airbus A320 series, and ERJ190.

== History ==
The relocation project of Shihezi Airport was officially approved by the State Council and the Central Military Commission in October 2010, and construction was approved by the National Development and Reform Commission in April 2012. The total investment of the project was 515 million yuan. Construction started at the end of May 2012 and the project was expected to complete in 2014. The project was actually completed a year later than originally planned. On December 26, 2015, the airport completed its maiden flight and officially began operations.

On February 22, 2016, the first scheduled civilian route at Shihezi Huayuan Airport officially commenced operation: the Kashgar-Shihezi-Zhengzhou route. The inaugural flight, operated by a Boeing 737-700 (registration number B5250), took off from Kashgar Airport, made a brief stop at Shihezi Huayuan Airport, and continued on to Zhengzhou.

The Shihezi Huayuan Airport expansion and renovation project was approved in 2019, aiming to extend the original runway length from 2,400 meters to the current 2,800 meters. The project was completed on October 19, 2020.

== Facilities ==
Shihezi Airport has a runway that is 2,400 meters long and 45 meters wide (class 4C), a 3,000-square-meter terminal building, three parking aprons for commercial aircraft, and 40 parking spaces for general aviation aircraft. It is designed to handle 180,000 passengers and 270 tons of cargo per year by 2020.

== Airlines and destinations ==
Airlines	Destinations
Chengdu Airlines	Aksu, Aral, Fuzhou, Hotan, Jinan, Yining
China Express Airlines	Aksu, Altay, Aral, Hami, Korla, Tumxuk, Yining
China Southern Airlines	Shenyang, Tacheng
Hainan Airlines	Dalian, Shijiazhuang
Spring Airlines	Lanzhou, Shanghai–Pudong

== See also ==
- List of airports in China
- List of the busiest airports in China
