= Changsha Huanghua International Airport =

International airport in Hunan, China

Changsha Huanghua International Airport 长沙黄花国际机场
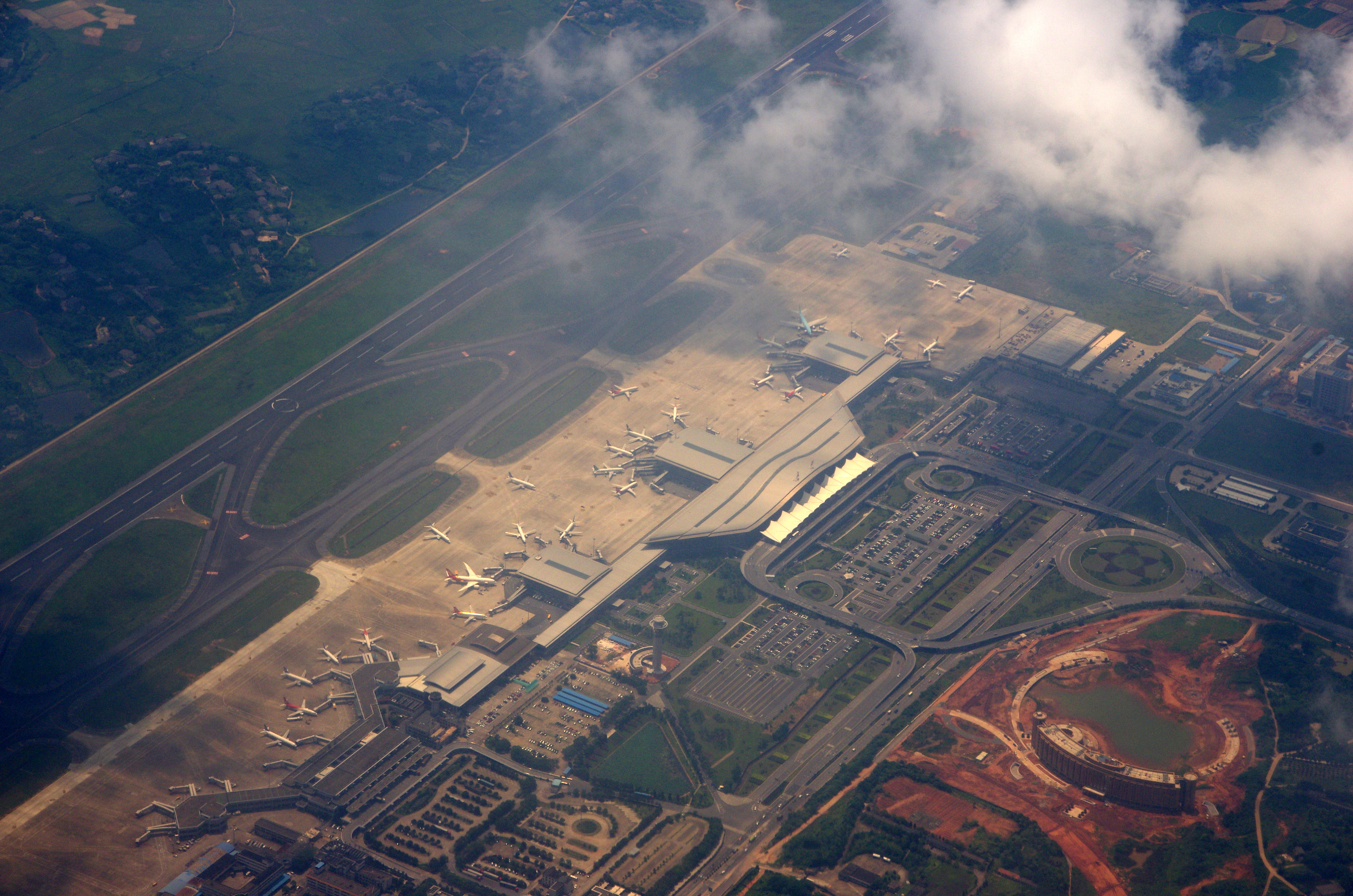
- IATA: CSX; ICAO: ZGHA

Summary
- Airport type: Public
- Owner/Operator: Hunan Airport Management Group Co., Ltd.
- Serves: Changsha; Zhuzhou; Xiangtan
- Location: Huanghua Town, Changsha County, Changsha, Hunan, China
- Opened: 29 August 1989; 37 years ago (official)
- Focus city for: China Southern Airlines; Hainan Airlines; XiamenAir
- Elevation AMSL: 66 m (217 ft)
- Coordinates: 28°11′48″N 113°13′15″E
- Website: csa.hnjcjt.com

Maps
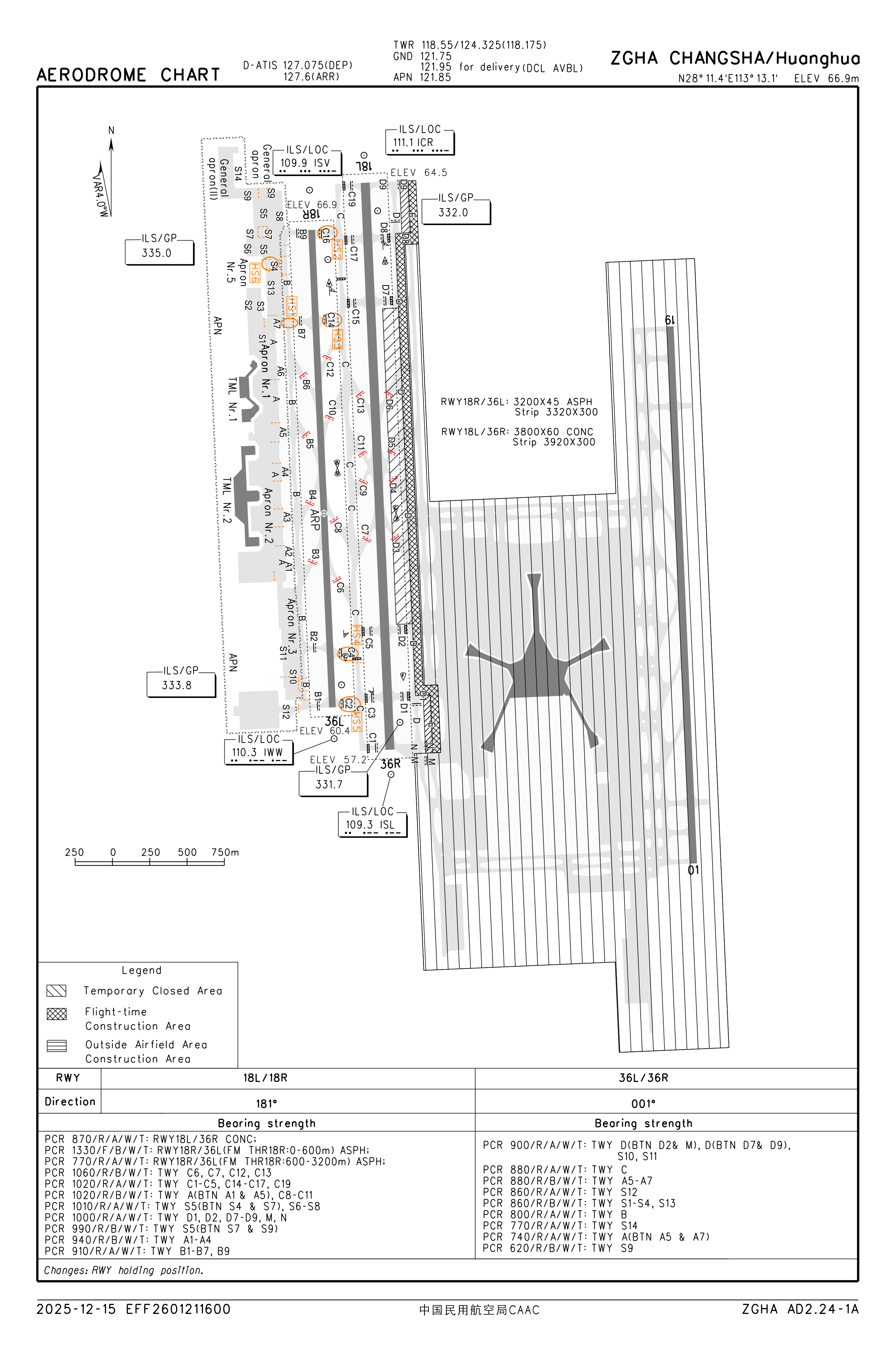
- CAAC airport chart

- Location in Hunan Location in China

Runways
Direction	Length		Surface
Direction	m	ft	Surface
01/19	3,200	10,499	Asphalt
18R/36L	3,800	12,467	Concrete
18L/36R	3,600 (Under construction)	11,811	Concrete

Statistics (2025)
- Passengers: 30,253,675 ▼3.1%
- Aircraft movements: 205,723 ▲5.4%
- Cargo: 166,808.6 ▼16.5%
- Source: CAAC Central and Southern Regional Administration, List of the busiest airports in the People's Republic of China

Changsha Huanghua International Airport
- Simplified Chinese: 长沙黄花国际机场
- Traditional Chinese: 長沙黃花國際機場
Transcriptions
Standard Mandarin
- Hanyu Pinyin: Chángshā Huánghuā Guójì Jīchǎng

Changsha Huanghua International Airport (IATA: CSX, ICAO: ZGHA) is an international airport serving Changsha, the capital of South Central China's Hunan province, and the Greater Changsha Metropolitan Region comprising the nearby cities of Zhuzhou and Xiangtan.

In 2022, the airport ranked as the 12th busiest civil airport in China, the second busiest in South Central China after Guangzhou Baiyun International Airport and the busiest in Central China. By 2025, however, Changsha Huanghua International Airport had been overtaken by Shenzhen Bao'an International Airport, and no longer held the position of South Central China's second busiest airport.

Located about 25 kilometres (16 mi) from downtown Changsha in the town of Huanghua in Changsha County, the airport has two terminal buildings. The airport is managed by the Hunan Airport Authority, a publicly owned corporation managing all five airports in Hunan Province. Huanghua airport was opened in August 1989, replacing Changsha Datuopu Airport, which is now a military air base.

== History ==
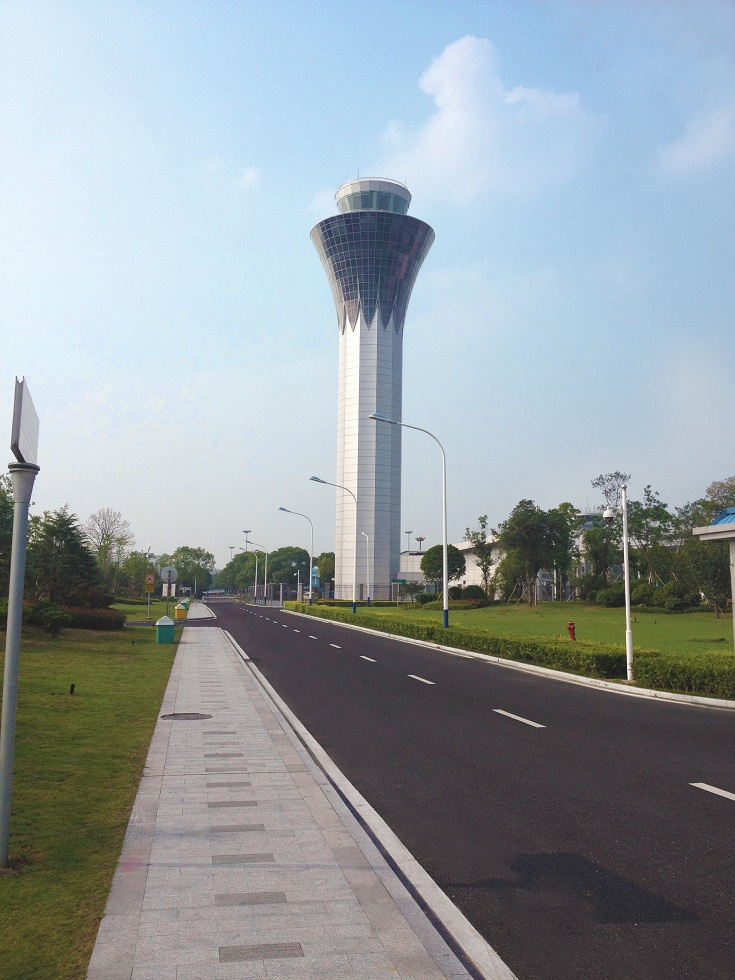
Changsha Airport control tower

From 1957 to 1989, Datuopu Airport served as a dual-use military and civil airport for Changsha. It was only capable of handling small aircraft and a few flights per day. The Hunan Provincial Government proposed the construction of a new airport in October 1984, which was approved by the State Council of China. Construction for Huanghua Airport began in June 1986, and it was opened on 29 August 1989, when all civil flights were transferred to the new airport, and Datuopu reverted to sole military use.

The airport then went through a major expansion in 2008–2011, with lengthening of runway 18/36 from 2,600 metres (8,500 ft) to 3,200 metres (10,500 ft) and the addition of Terminal 2 which went into operation in 2011. The airport welcomed its first intercontinental destination when China Southern Airlines began service to Frankfurt, Germany on 23 June 2014.

== Terminals ==
=== Terminal 1 ===
Terminal 1, with 32,000 square metres (340,000 sq ft) of space, has three concourses (T1-A, T1-B and T1-c). It opened in 2000, with a proposed annual capacity of 4.6 million passengers. Terminal 1 was closed for renovation from July 2011 to 17 May 2018 after Terminal 2 became fully operational.

Terminal 1 reopened on 18 May 2018. After renovation, Terminal 1 has 39,000 square metres (420,000 sq ft) of space, 38 check-in counters, 10 security lanes and 10 aerobridges. It has the capacity of six million passengers annually. Terminal 1 serves Air China, Chengdu Airlines, Joy Air, Okay Airways, Tibet Airlines, Shandong Airlines, Shenzhen Airlines and Kunming Airlines.

Terminal 1 gallery
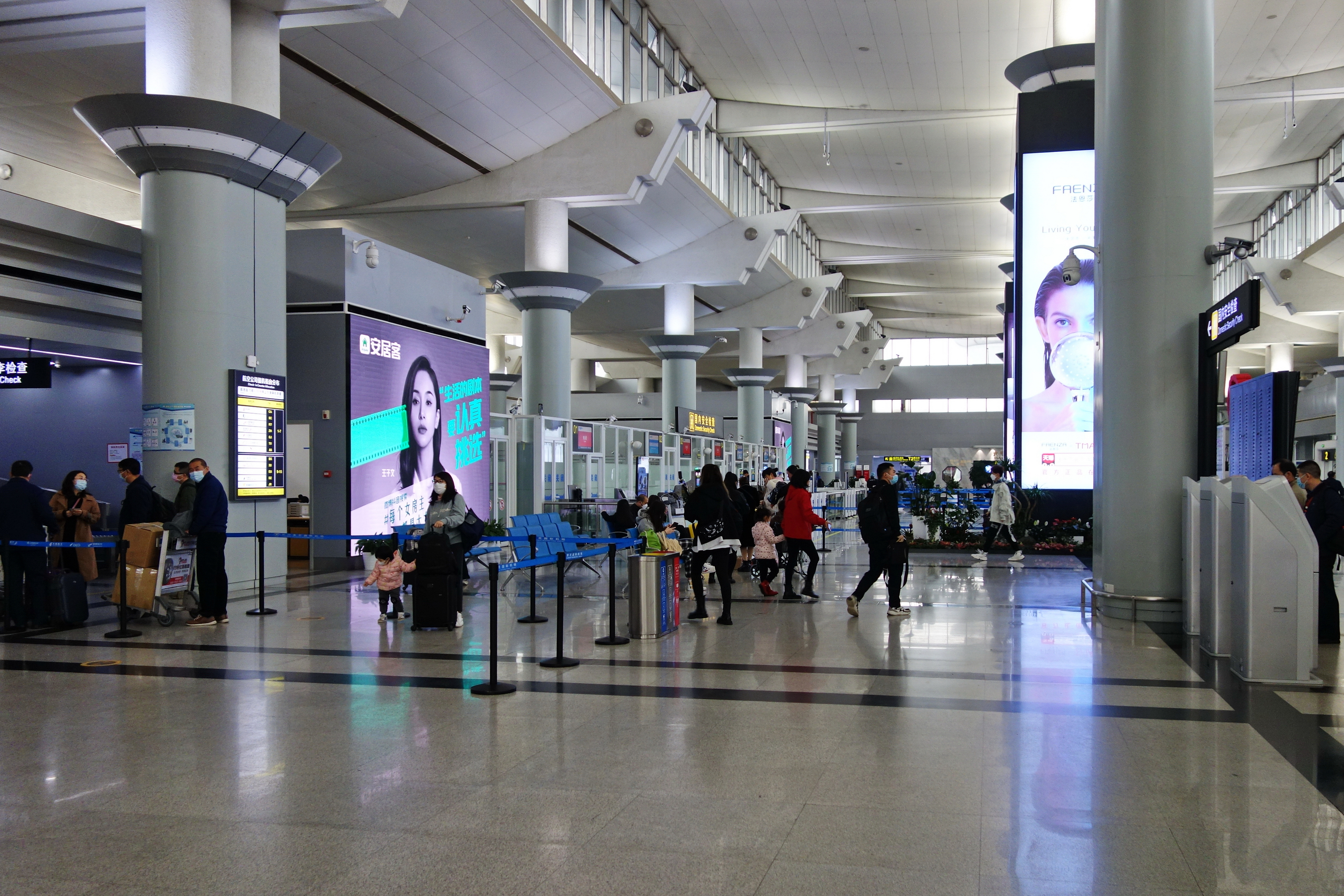
Terminal 1 departure hall

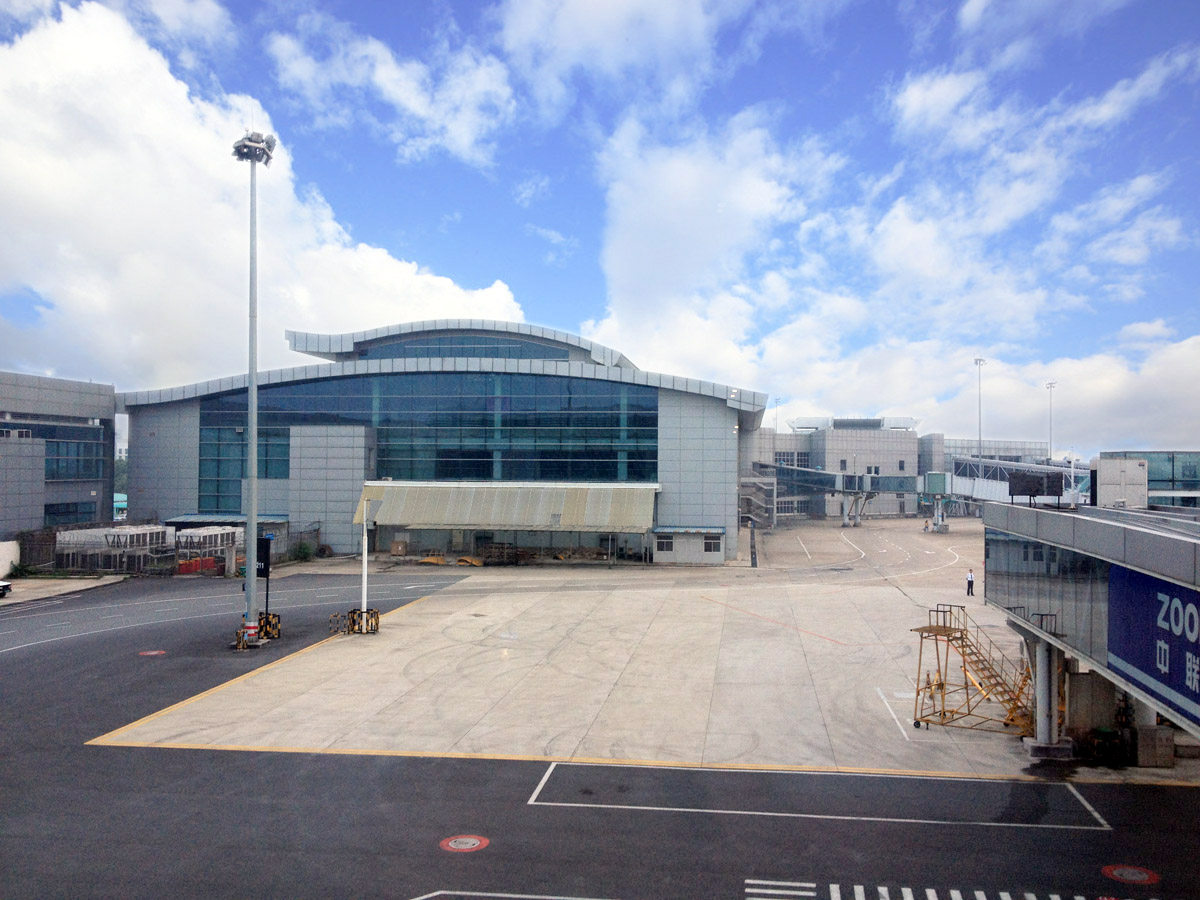
Terminal 1 and concourses

=== Terminal 2 ===
The inauguration of Terminal 2 was on 19 July 2011. With 212,000 m^{2} (2,280,000 sq ft) of space, the new terminal is the fifth largest airport terminal in mainland China (after Beijing–Capital, Shanghai–Pudong, Guangzhou, and Shenzhen). The 39.9-metre (131 ft) tall main building of Terminal 2, being 672 metres (2,205 ft) in length and 168 metres (551 ft) in depth, is the largest single steel-truss structure in Hunan. The new terminal has 22 bridge gates, to which the longest passenger walking distance is within 300 metres (980 ft). With this new facility, the airport can handle 151,000 aircraft movements and another 15.6 million passengers every year. The peak hour volume of passengers is 3,940.

The terminal has 80 check-in counters and 24 self-checkin kiosks, 24 security checkpoints and more than 6,390 seats. The arrival hall is equipped with eight baggage carousels (six at domestic area and two at international area). The indoor parking garage P4, which has 693 parking spaces, is on floor B2. There are also three outdoor parking areas, P1, 2 and 3, which provide over 1000 parking spaces.

Terminal 2 gallery
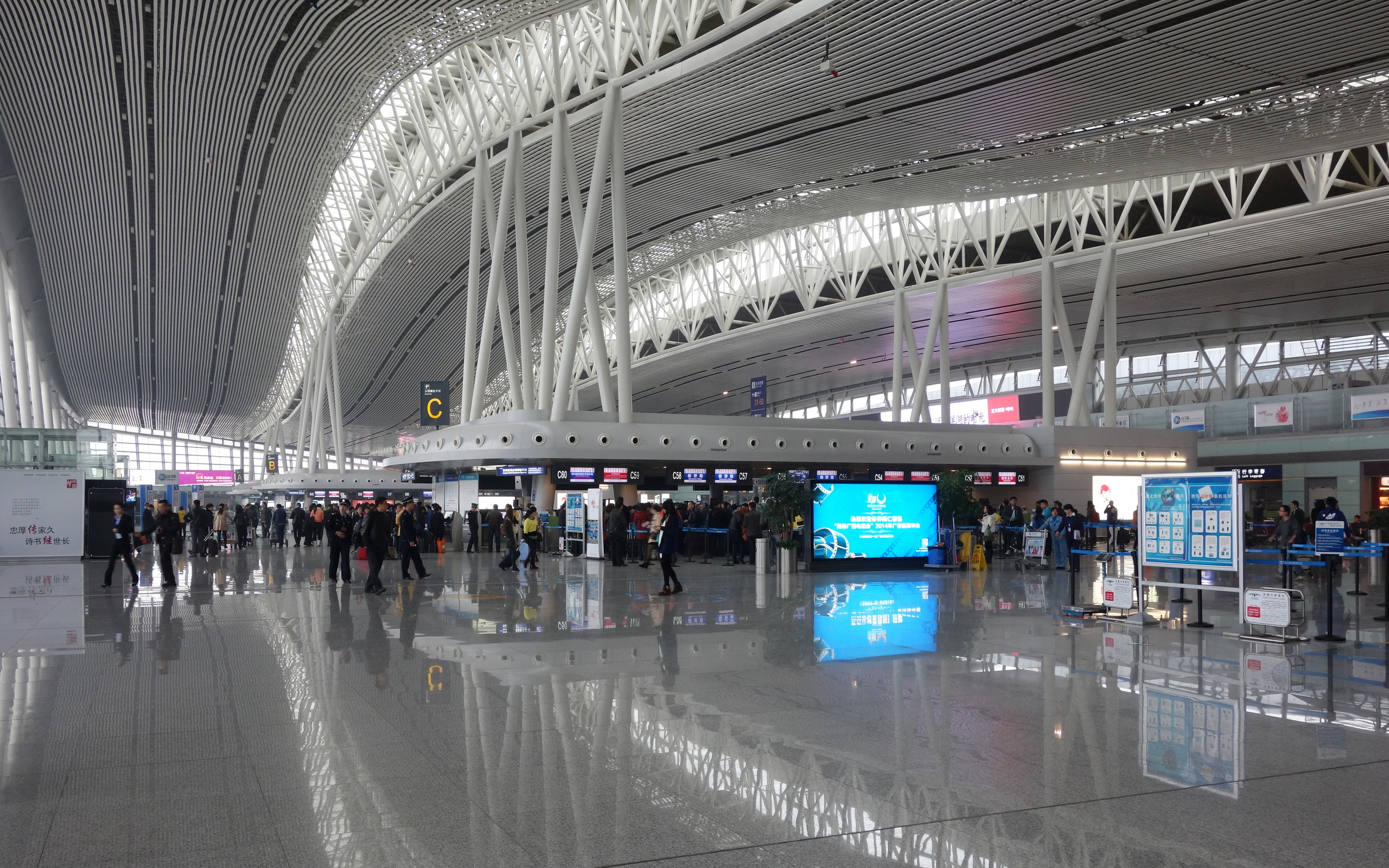
Terminal 2 departure hall

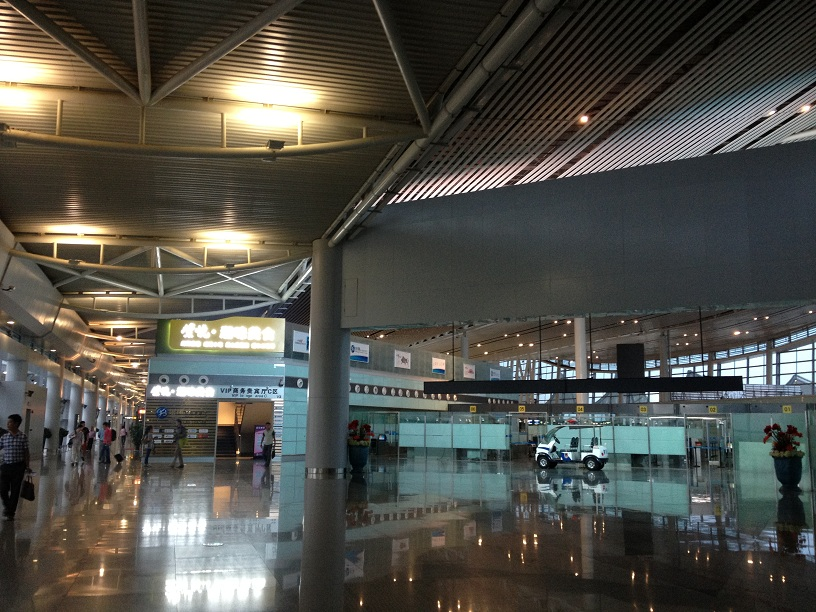
Terminal 2

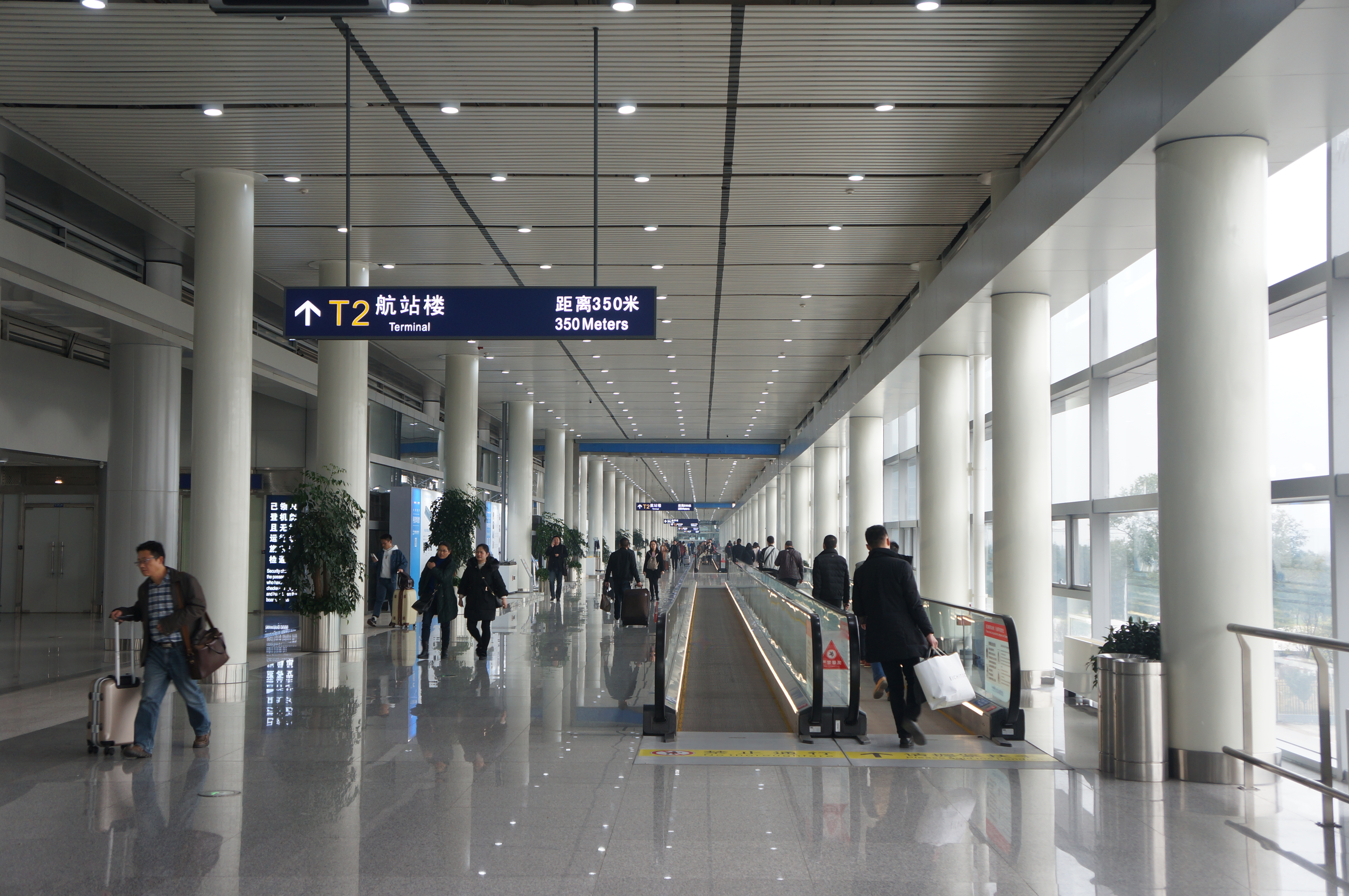
Maglev-Terminal corridor

== Long-term expansion ==
Terminal 4 is to be constructed on the north side of the East terminal area. The east terminal area, in which both Terminals 3 and 4 lie, is located between the second and third runways. At the final stage, the fourth parallel runway (3,600 metres [11,800 ft]) of 4E will be constructed 1,035 metres (3,396 ft) east of the third runway. Two tunnels connecting the west area (Terminal 1&2) and the east terminals (Terminal 3&4) are considered.

Changsha Huanghua International Airport will become a major hub in China, which hosts several airlines. The airport's ultimate capacity will be 90 million passengers annually.

== Airlines and destinations ==
=== Passenger ===
Airlines	Destinations
9 Air	Jiayuguan
AirAsia X	Kuala Lumpur–International
Air China	Dalian, Jinan
Air Guilin	Wuhu
Air Travel	Baoshan, Beihai, Bangkok-Suvarnabhumi, Beijing–Daxing, Harbin, Kunming, Lijiang, Lishui, Mangshi, Nanchang, Ningbo, Quanzhou, Shenyang, Turpan, Wuxi, Xining, Yibin, Zhoushan
Asiana Airlines	Seoul–Incheon
Batik Air Malaysia	Kuala Lumpur–International
Beijing Capital Airlines	Bangkok–Suvarnabhumi, Beijing–Daxing, Harbin, Lijiang, Qingdao, Shenyang
Cambodia Airways	Phnom Penh
Cathay Pacific	Hong Kong
Chengdu Airlines	Aksu, Aral, Barkol, Changchun, Hami, Lijiang, Qitai, Xishuangbanna
China Eastern Airlines	Beijing–Daxing, Changzhou, Chengdu–Tianfu, Dalian, Jieyang, Lanzhou, Ningbo, Taiyuan, Yantai
China Express Airlines	Baotou, Meizhou, Shuozhou, Tianjin, Zhoushan
China Southern Airlines	Addis Ababa, Baise, Beijing–Daxing, Chengdu–Tianfu, Chongqing, Dali, Dalian, Daqing, Guangzhou, Heze, Hohhot, Hong Kong, Jiaxing, Jieyang, Kashgar, Macau, Nagoya–Centrair, Nairobi–Jomo Kenyatta, Nanning, Ningbo, Nyingchi, Shenzhen, Singapore, Taiyuan, Xining, Yiwu
China United Airlines	Wenzhou
Chongqing Airlines	Taizhou, Xiamen
Donghai Airlines	Sanya
Fuzhou Airlines	Fuzhou, Harbin, Lanzhou, Ürümqi, Xiamen
GX Airlines	Nanning, Wanzhou, Xuzhou, Yulin (Shaanxi), Zhoushan
Hainan Airlines	Lanzhou, London–Heathrow, Qingdao, Taiyuan, Tangshan
Hebei Airlines	Beijing–Daxing
Himalaya Airlines	Kathmandu (suspended)
Juneyao Air	Chengdu–Tianfu, Chifeng, Qingdao
Korean Air	Seoul–Incheon
Kunming Airlines	Lijiang, Linyi, Shenyang, Tengchong, Yangzhou, Yuncheng
Lao Airlines	Vientiane
LJ Air	Dalian, Harbin, Linfen, Ningbo, Taiyuan, Xishuangbanna
Loong Air	Changchun, Xining, Yinchuan
Malaysia Airlines	Kuala Lumpur–International
Myanmar Airways International	Yangon
Okay Airways	Chongqing, Jieyang, Jinan, Yantai, Yinchuan
Pacific Airlines	Charter: Nha Trang
Qingdao Airlines	Hailar, Hohhot, Hotan, Lanzhou, Lijiang, Qingdao, Ürümqi, Xishuangbanna, Yining
Ruili Airlines	Mangshi, Wuxi, Yantai
Scoot	Singapore
Shandong Airlines	Yantai
Shanghai Airlines	Changchun, Ordos, Wenzhou
Shenzhen Airlines	Harbin
Sichuan Airlines	Chengdu–Tianfu, Harbin, Nantong, Xichang, Yancheng, Yibin
Spring Airlines	Jieyang, Lanzhou
Thai AirAsia	Bangkok–Don Mueang
Thai Airways International	Bangkok–Suvarnabhumi
Thai Lion Air	Bangkok–Don Mueang
Tianjin Airlines	Ankang, Chongqing, Huizhou, Xi'an, Yancheng, Yulin (Shaanxi)
Urumqi Air	Zhanjiang
West Air	Jinan, Manila, Vientiane
XiamenAir	Bangkok–Suvarnabhumi, Chengdu–Tianfu, Fuzhou, Haikou, Hohhot, Jiayuguan, Luzhou, Mianyang, Nantong, Qingdao, Quanzhou, Sanya, Shanghai–Hongqiao, Taiyuan, Xiamen, Xining, Yan'an, Yuncheng
Xizang Airlines	Guangyuan, Pu'er

=== Cargo ===
Airlines	Destinations
Jisheng Airlines	Belgrade
SF Airlines	Osaka–Kansai

== Statistics ==
As for 2025, Changsha Huanghua International Airport was the 15th busiest airport in the People's Republic of China with 30,253,675 passengers.

Year	Passengers	% change	Cargo (tons)	Aircraft movements
2017	23,764,820	▲11.6	138,737.6	179,575
2016	21,296,675	▲13.8	130,276.1	167,910
2015	18,715,278	▲3.9	122,022.1	153,367
2014	18,020,501	▲12.6	125,037.8	152,359
2013	16,007,212	▲8.5	117,588.7	137,843
2012	14,749,701	▲7.8	110,608.0	127,041
2011	13,684,731	▲8.4	114,831.1	116,727
2010	12,621,333	▲8.4	108,635.2	115,635
2009	11,284,282	▲33.5	86,995.0	110,023
2008	8,454,808	▲4.8	71,151.9	85,339
2007	8,069,989	▲14.9	68,629.7	82,041
2006	6,592,602	▲22.4	62,571.3	71,139
2005	5,301,396	▲24.4	52,360.3	59,534
2004	3,802,550	▲27.1	43,133.2	55,054
2003	2,992,543	▲15.2	34,987.5	46,993
2002	2,598,508	▲17.2	25,437.9	42,920
2001	2,217,088	▲9.0	20,375.2	39,194
2000	2,034,526	-	18,552.0	37,722

Changsha Airport passenger totals 2000–2016 (millions)

== Ground transportation ==
=== Maglev ===
- The regular-speed Changsha Maglev Express connects Changsha Huanghua International Airport and Changsha South railway station, it started operation on 6 May 2016.
  - The Maglev line is 18.5 km (11.5 mi) long and trains and runs at a speed of 120 km/h (75 mph) to finish the journey in just over 10 minutes.
  - The ticket price is ¥20 between the Airport and South Railway Station. Metro-card holders can receive a 10% discount.

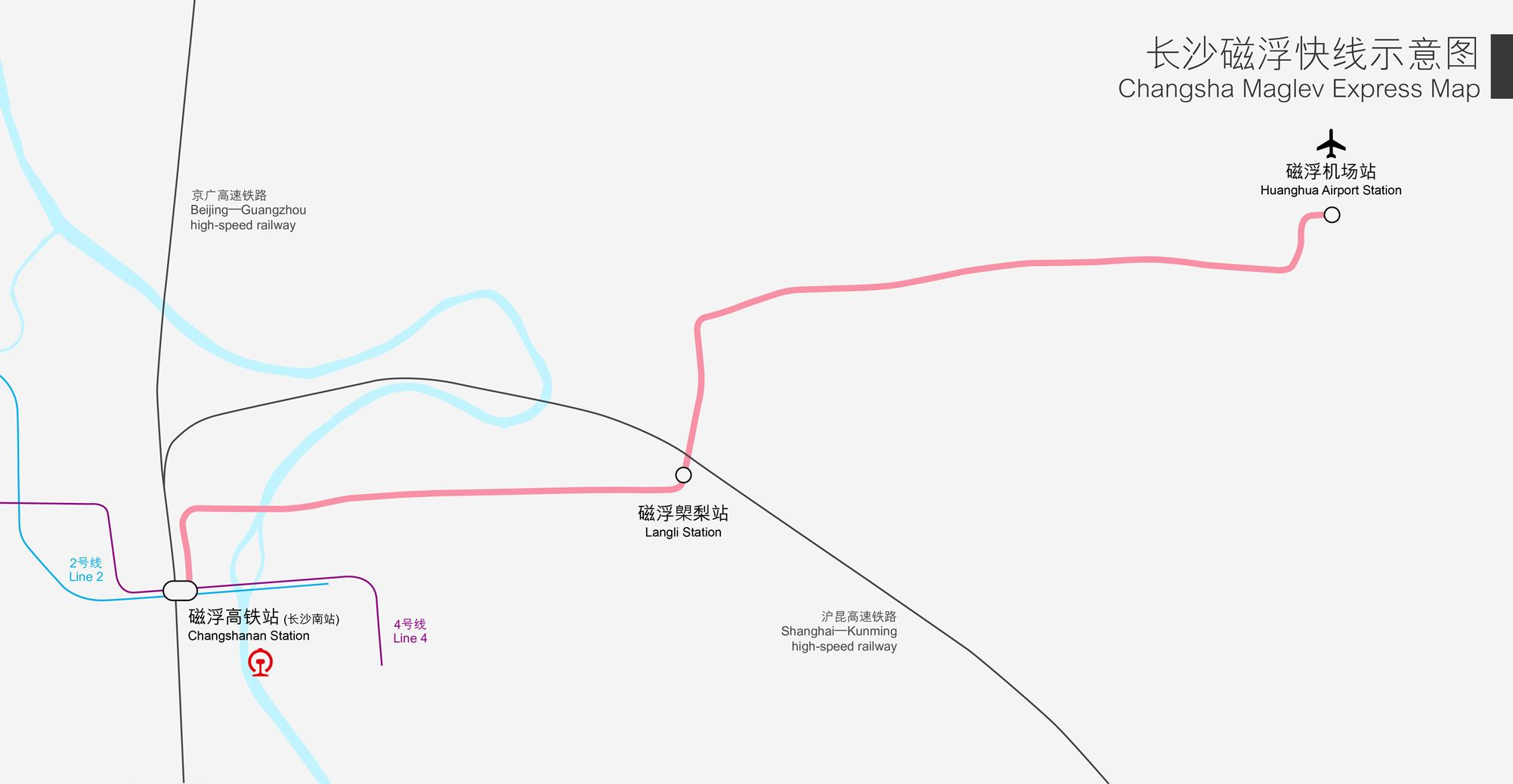
Map of Changsha Maglev Express

Station name English	Station name Chinese	Transfer	Location
Changshanan	磁浮高铁站	2 4 CWQ	Yuhua
Langli	磁浮㮾梨		Changsha County
Huanghua Airport	磁浮机场	CSX; 6	Changsha County

=== Metro ===
- Line 6 of Changsha Metro also reaches the airport via Huanghua Airport T1 & T2 station.

=== Rail ===
- The planned Changsha–Ganzhou high-speed railway will have an airport railway station.

=== Bus ===
- There are direct shuttle buses connecting the airport with Hunan Civil Aviation Hotel (with one stop at Gao Qiao on the way), Changsha South Railway Station, and South Bus Station

== See also ==
- List of airports in China
- List of the busiest airports in China
