= Kashgar Laining International Airport =

Airport serving Kashgar, Xinjiang, China

Kashgar Laining International Airport 喀什徕宁国际机场 قەشقەر خەلقئارا ئايرودرومى
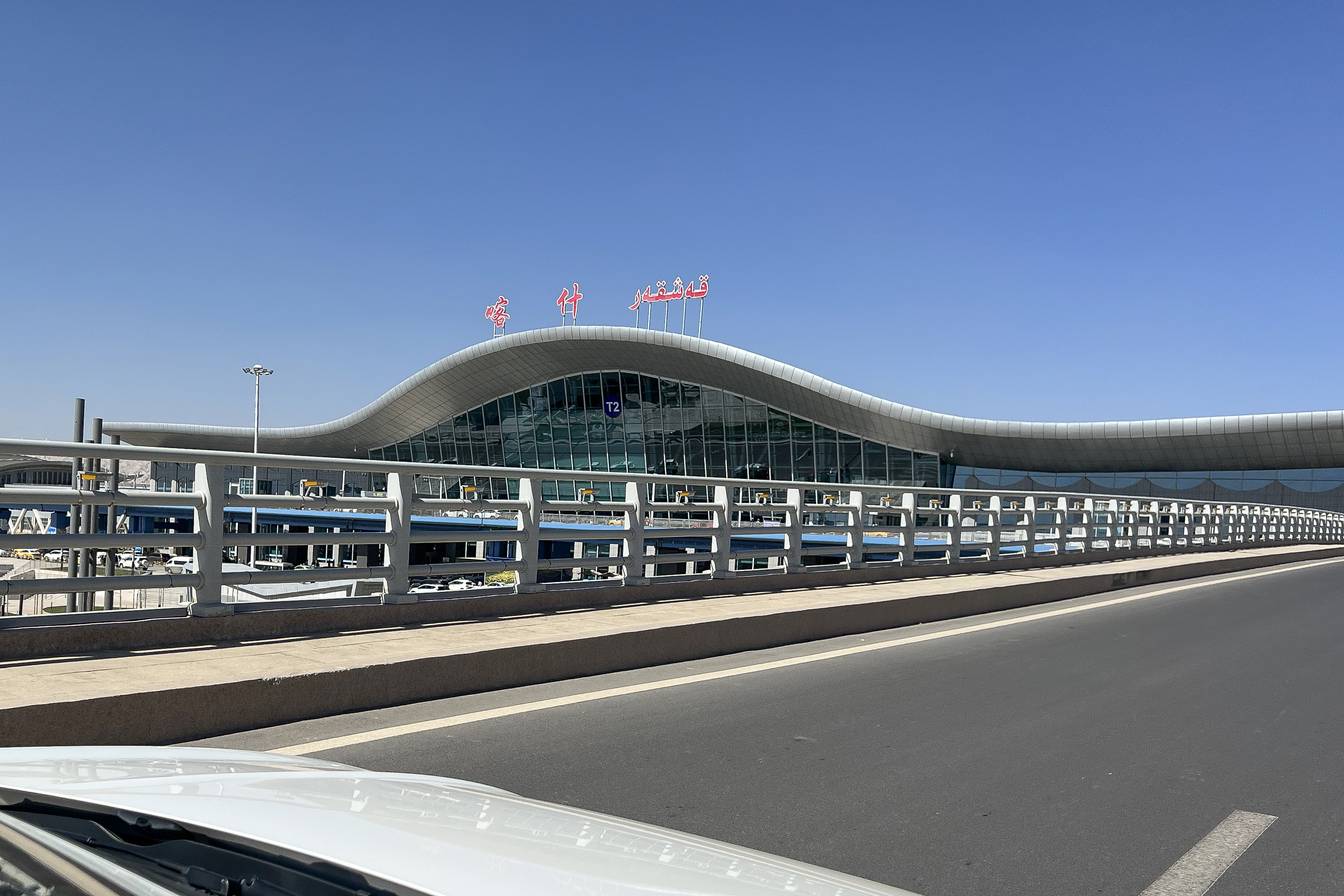
- IATA: KHG; ICAO: ZWSH

Summary
- Airport type: Public/Military
- Operator: Government
- Serves: Kashgar
- Opened: 10 March 1954; 72 years ago
- Elevation AMSL: 4,529 ft (1,380 m)
- Coordinates: 39°32′35″N 076°01′12″E

Maps
- CAAC airport chart
- Location in Xinjiang KHG/ZWSH (China)

Runways
Direction	Length		Surface
Direction	m	ft	Surface
08/26	3,200	10,499	Concrete

Statistics (2025)
- Passengers: 5,233,499
- Aircraft movements: 41,956
- Cargo (metric tons): 25,121.6
- Source: DAFIF; CAAC

Kashgar Laining International Airport
- Simplified Chinese: 喀什徕宁国际机场
- Traditional Chinese: 喀什徠寧國際機場
Transcriptions
Standard Mandarin
- Hanyu Pinyin: Kāshí Láiníng Guójì Jīchǎng

Kashi Laining International Airport (IATA: KHG, ICAO: ZWSH), formerly Kashgar Airport (Note: simplified Chinese: 喀什机场; traditional Chinese: 喀什機場; pinyin: Kāshí Jīchǎng) until August 2023, is a dual-use military-civilian airport serving Kashgar (Kashi), a city in Uyghur autonomous region of Xinjiang in the People's Republic of China.

According to the Civil Aviation Administration of China, in 2025, Kashgar Laining International Airport recorded 41,956 flight takeoffs and landings, and 5.23 million passenger movements, representing a year-on-year increases of 16.4% and 13.9% respectively.

== History ==
Kashi Laining International Airport opened in October 1953. In 2006 the first international flights started.

== Facilities ==
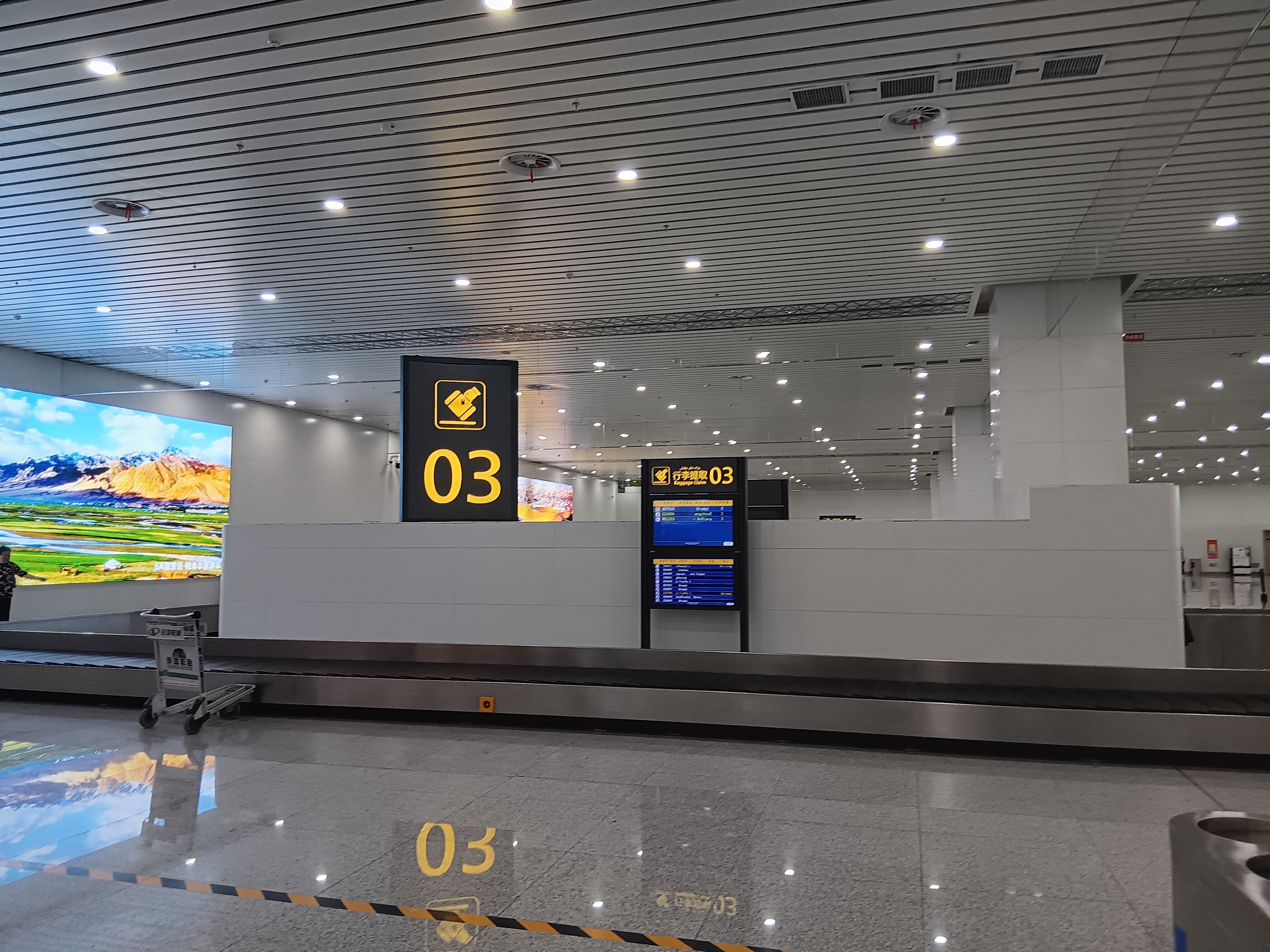
Baggage claim area

The airport resides at an elevation of 4,529 feet (1,380 m) above mean sea level. It has one runway designated 08/26 with a concrete surface measuring 3,200 by 41 metres (10,499 ft × 135 ft), suitable for serving aircraft such as the Boeing 747-400.

The terminal has an area of 23,800 m^{2} (256,000 ft^{2}) and has 8 gates.

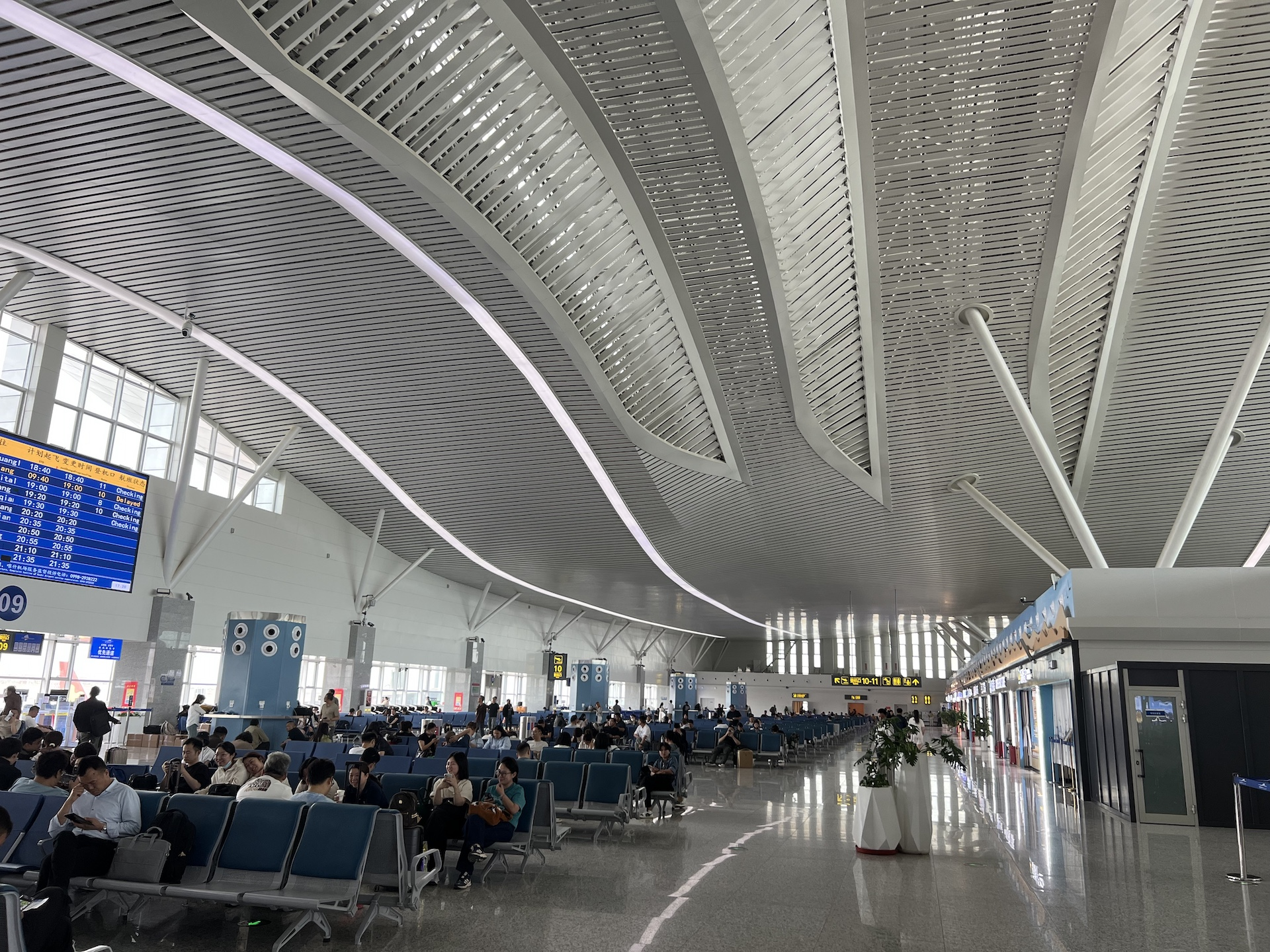
Terminal 2

== Airlines and destinations ==
A Loong Airlines plane from Zhengzhou lands at Kashi Airport

Airlines	Destinations
Air China	Beijing–Capital, Chengdu–Tianfu, Ürümqi
Chengdu Airlines	Aksu, Altay, Aral, Barkol, Bole, Hami, Hotan, Karamay, Khujand, Kuqa, Lanzhou, Osh, Qitai, Tacheng, Turpan, Yining, Yutian
China Eastern Airlines	Hangzhou, Ngari–Gunsa, Shanghai–Hongqiao, Shanghai–Pudong, Ürümqi, Xi'an
China Express Airlines	Aksu, Altay, Aral, Bole, Hami, Hotan, Karamay, Korla, Kuqa, Shache, Tumxuk, Yining, Yutian
China Southern Airlines	Beijing–Daxing, Changsha, Chengdu–Tianfu, Guangzhou, Hotan, Islamabad, Jinan, Korla, Shanghai–Hongqiao, Shanghai–Pudong, Shenzhen, Tashkurgan, Ürümqi, Zhengzhou
Chongqing Airlines	Chongqing
Fuzhou Airlines	Lanzhou,
Hainan Airlines	Beijing–Capital, Shenzhen, Ürümqi, Zhengzhou
Loong Air	Guangzhou, Hangzhou, Ningbo, Xi'an, Yinchuan, Zhengzhou
Lucky Air	Ngari–Gunsa, Ürümqi
Shandong Airlines	Jinan, Ürümqi
Sichuan Airlines	Beijing–Capital, Chengdu–Shuangliu, Ürümqi
Spring Airlines	Lanzhou
Tianjin Airlines	Ürümqi
Tibet Airlines	Ngari–Gunsa, Xining
Urumqi Air	Chengdu–Tianfu, Ürümqi, Zhanjiang, Zhengzhou
West Air	Xining, Zhengzhou, Zhongwei

=== Cargo ===
Airlines	Destinations
YTO Cargo Airlines	Karachi

== See also ==
- List of airports in the People's Republic of China
- Varanasi International Airport
