= Zhongwei Shapotou Airport =

Zhongwei Shapotou Airport 中卫沙坡头机场
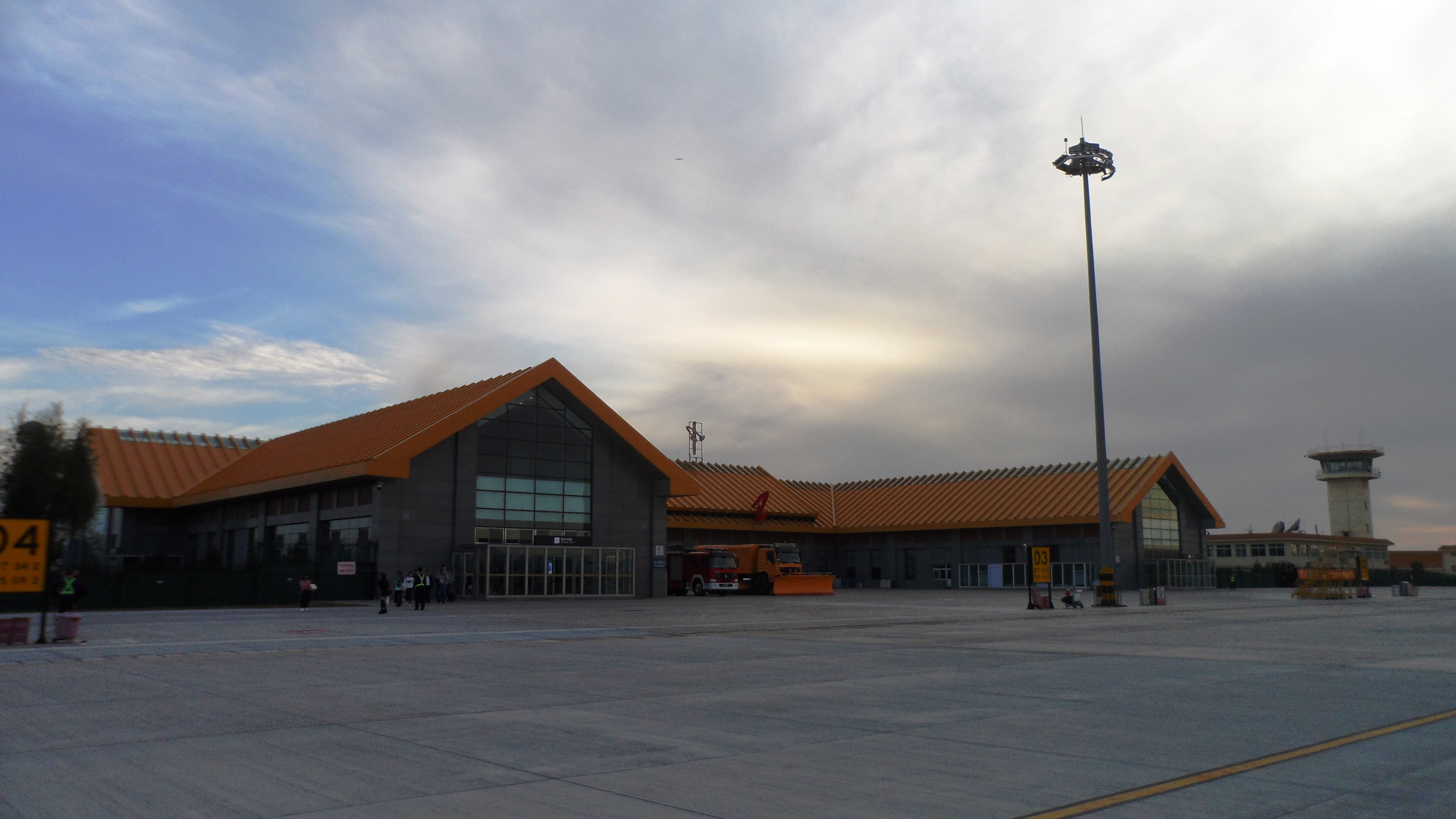
- IATA: ZHY; ICAO: ZLZW

Summary
- Airport type: Public
- Operator: China West Airport Group
- Location: Zhongwei, Ningxia, China
- Elevation AMSL: 1,240 m / 4,068 ft
- Coordinates: 37°34′22″N 105°09′16″E
- Website: zhongwei.cwag.com westaport.com (archived)

Map
- Location of airport in Ningxia

Runways
Direction	Length		Surface
Direction	m	ft	Surface
09/27	2,800	9,186	Concrete

Statistics (2025)
- Passengers: 329,627
- Aircraft movements: 13,952
- Cargo (metric tons): 1,591.4

Zhongwei Shapotou Airport
- Simplified Chinese: 中卫沙坡头机场
- Traditional Chinese: 中衛沙坡頭機場
Transcriptions
Standard Mandarin
- Hanyu Pinyin: Zhōngwèi Shāpōtóu Jīchǎng

Zhongwei Shapotou Airport (IATA: ZHY, ICAO: ZLZW) is an airport serving the city of Zhongwei in Ningxia Hui Autonomous Region, China. It is located 9 kilometers (5.6 mi) northwest of the city. The airport cost 370 million yuan to build and started operation on 26 December 2008. It was originally called Zhongwei Xiangshan Airport (中卫香山机场), but adopted the current name in August 2012 to promote the local tourist attraction Shapotou.

== History ==
The predecessor of Zhongwei Shapotou Airport was Zhongwei Xiangshan Airport. On September 22, 2006, the construction of Zhongwei Xiangshan Airport was formally proposed. On November 8, 2006, the Civil Aviation Administration of China (CAAC) preliminarily determined the airport site. Construction began on March 16, 2008, and the main project was completed on August 31 of the same year. The airport underwent calibration flights in November 2008, test flights on December 10th, and officially opened to traffic on December 26th, with its first route being the Xi'an route operated by China Eastern Airlines using an Airbus A320.

On July 16, 2012, Zhongwei Xiangshan Airport was officially renamed Zhongwei Shapotou Airport.

In 2014, the preliminary design plan for the apron expansion project was approved by the Northwest Regional Administration of the Civil Aviation Administration of China, and construction began. On January 29, 2015, the airport apron expansion project passed industry acceptance inspection.

In 2019, the second phase expansion project of Zhongwei Shapotou Airport completed the overall planning and review by the Northwest Regional Administration of Civil Aviation. The project included the construction of a new 10,000-square-meter terminal building, five Class C parking stands, three jet bridges, and one connecting taxiway, aiming to increase the airport's capacity. On September 19, 2025, the expansion of Zhongwei Shapotou Airport was included in the 14th Five-Year Plan and the 2035 Vision Outline.

== Airlines and destinations ==
Airlines	Destinations
Beijing Capital Airlines	Hangzhou, Xining
Chengdu Airlines	Chengdu–Tianfu, Turpan
Donghai Airlines	Shenzhen, Zhengzhou
Juneyao Air	Shanghai–Pudong, Xi'an
Sichuan Airlines	Beijing–Capital, Kunming
West Air	Chongqing, Kashgar, Zhengzhou

== See also ==
- List of airports in China
- List of the busiest airports in China
