= Zhengzhou Airport riot =

2014 civil unrest in China

- Part of protest and dissent in China
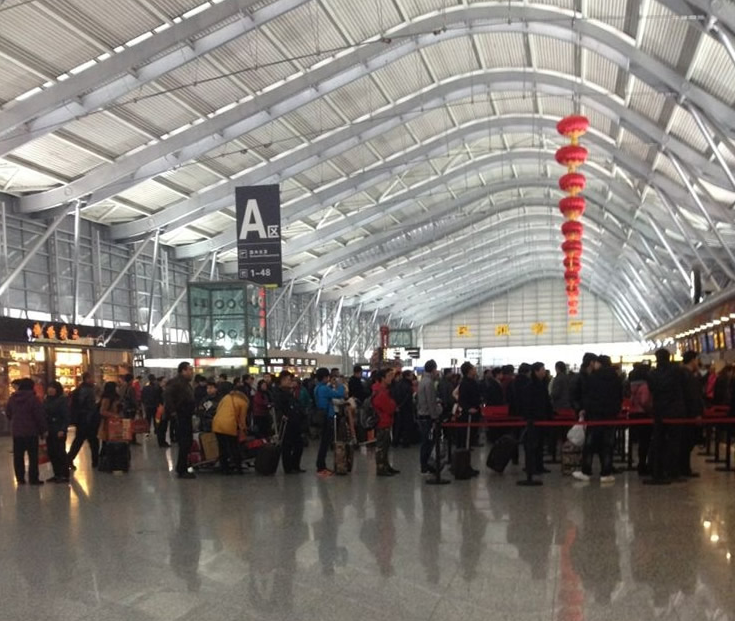
- Interior of airport's terminal in July 2014, after riots
- Date: 5–6 February 2014
- Location: Zhengzhou Xinzheng International Airport, China; 34.52625°N 113.84161°E
- Caused by: Lack of information about status of delayed or canceled flights during weather-related airport closure
- Goals: Get information, vent frustrations
- Methods: Vandalism, assault
- Result: Order restored by police

Parties
Stranded travellers	Chinese Police

Number
2,000	160

Casualties
- Death: None reported
- Arrested: None reported

The Zhengzhou Airport riot occurred on 5–6 February 2014. Passengers at the airport in Zhengzhou, capital of the Chinese province of Henan, angry over lengthy delays due to snowy weather, smashed computers at airline check-in counters and destroyed information kiosks. It has been estimated that as many as 2,000 people took part over two days before police were able to restore order.

Some of the angry passengers had been waiting for as long as five days to catch flights back to their jobs in other cities after their annual trips to see family during the Chinese New Year holiday period. They were further frustrated by the lack of information from airline and airport staff while they waited. The mass incident highlighted the difficulties faced by China's commercial airline industry as more and more passengers choose to fly to their destinations; the airlines blamed the disorder on passengers' limited understanding of the nature of commercial aviation.

After the riot, police did not report making any arrests, which outraged some commentators on Chinese social media. However, most of the public sympathized with their underlying complaints. In the years since, Chinese authorities have moved to open up more of the country's airspace, largely under military control, to commercial flights.

== Background ==
With the industrialization and urbanization of China following its late 20th-century reform and opening up, many younger workers left their homes in rural areas to work in growing cities. They are able to return usually only once a year, during the New Year in February. The 3.6 billion individual trips this involves over a 40-day period has been described as the world's largest annual migration.

In the 1990s, when this demographic shift began, most of those workers traveled by train, putting great strain on the country's rail network. Overcrowding and long travel times led some travellers to take to the air as an alternative, especially as the country's three major state-owned airlines continued to grow, despite the military limiting civil aviation to less than 30% of the country's airspace. This problem has been compounded on occasion when the People's Liberation Army Air Force has ordered traffic reductions at major airports to free up airspace for training missions. Smog around airports also causes delays.

By 2013 FlightStats ranked several Chinese airports among its 20 worst in terms of on-time flight departures. Combined with unrealistic expectations by many newer Chinese flyers from the days when air travel was seen as luxury available only to a few, air rage incidents began occurring in the 2010s.

Most of the reported air rage incidents involved a single passenger, or small groups, such as the case of Yan Linkun, a Communist Party official in Yunnan stripped of his position and sent to prison after a widely publicized incident, caught on video, where he smashed a gate agent's laptop in 2013. However some turned into mass incidents involving larger groups of what began being called the "air rage tribe". (Note: Chinese: 空怒族; pinyin: kōng nú zù) In summer 2013, 30 Nanchang Changbei International Airport passengers angry about a seven-hour weather delay pushed past security and occupied the runway. Airports began avoiding announcing flight delays except when there was a "major event" affecting multiple flights.

== Riot ==
Heavy snowfall in central eastern China during the first week of February 2014 caused severe disruptions to intercity transportation during the busiest week of that year's New Year. Airports all over the country were plagued by delays, and even rail was affected, with trains limited to slower speeds due to the weather. By Wednesday, 5 February, Zhengzhou Xinzheng International Airport in Zhengzhou, the capital of Henan province, where many of those who worked elsewhere in the country had returned to visit their families for the holiday, was experiencing intermittent delays.

In the late afternoon, the continuing snow eventually turned those intermittent delays into a complete closing of the airport. Passengers continued to arrive, however. With the available seats in departure lounges long since filled, many sat and slept on their luggage, eating instant noodles they had prepared themselves as meals. Eventually it was believed that as many as 2,000 passengers were in the terminal building.

One passenger reportedly destroyed a China Southern Airlines information office. Another entered the airport's control room and struck Hu Xiaoyu, a staffer, then poured her drink over Hu. (Note: 7日，《河南商报》报导，郑州机场在5日并非完全封闭，而是间断性关闭了3次。报导称，正月初六21时许，一名乘客就砸了新郑机场南航问询处。一名女乘客冲进新郑机场调度室，打了调度人员，还把饮料泼在调度人员的头上) The woman threatened to post photos of the aftermath online, Hu said.

That break in decorum and order kicked off further violence the next day. There were reports that passengers had attacked check-in areas, assaulted staff before they could get away, smashed computers and generally otherwise vandalized the airline areas. Sina Weibo and other Chinese microblogging sites posted pictures of the damage to the terminal.

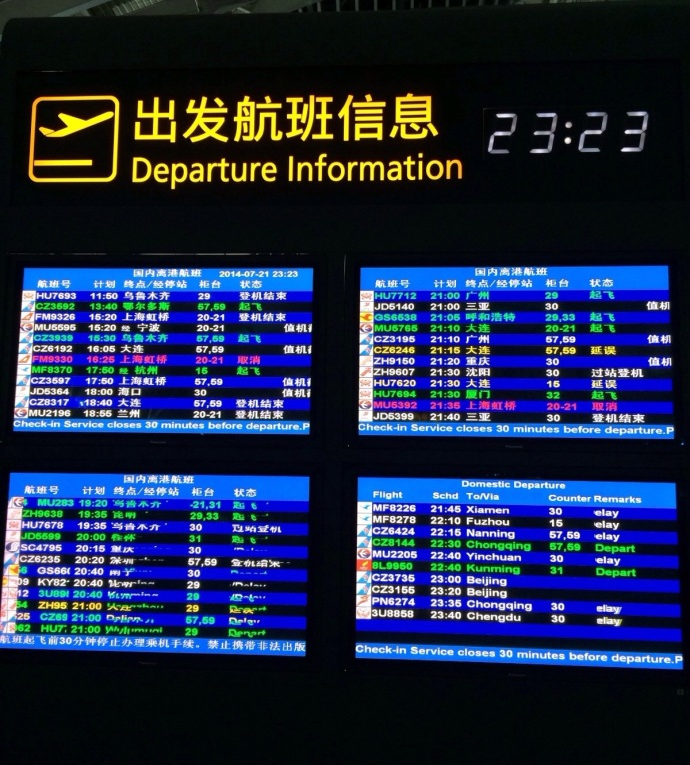
Angry passengers destroyed flight information displays at the airport, similar to this one.

Other stranded passengers recalled seeing water bottles thrown at flight information display boards. One said a thrower said "Down with China Eastern!" as he did. According to People's Daily, the captain of the local police station warned the airlines that if they continued to provide no information to travellers via the display boards, there would be violence.

Passengers who did not damage property nevertheless occupied gate areas and demanded their money back. (Note: 旅客1：打砸南航的那个我没看，东航的那个我没敢凑近看，我就听到有一人不停的喊，"打倒"东航。然后昨天里面每一个登机口就在喊，什么航什么航退钱退钱，就这个样子，特别乱。") Staff, many of whom had been working for over 24 hours with almost no breaks, barricaded themselves in offices for their own safety. "I've been wronged as well" Xiaoyu, the assault victim, told a local newspaper, explaining that delays meant she had to stay at work. "We can do nothing about the weather."

While the stranded passengers understood that the weather was beyond anyone's control, they nevertheless blamed the airport and airlines for failing to keep them informed of any changes. Communications technology, which might have helped fill the information vacuum, instead contributed to the confusion. The airport's wireless network was overwhelmed by passengers trying to access the Internet through their phones; likewise calls to the airport's hotline met with only a busy signal (Note: 打不通的96666热线，似乎也可以看出，当时的信息公布并不像机场承诺的那样及时： 旅客：现在我问机场，机场也不知道，我直接问着祥鹏航空公司他们总公司三个电话，两个打不通，一个打通了骂人在里面。你走不了你给我们安排住下，你直接给我个时间就行了是不是，等到现在都问不着，也没人过来问也没人过来管。) and the airport website crashed. Travellers also complained that whatever airport staff they could find not only knew nothing but responded to queries with indifference or even hostility.

Some staff complained that the passengers' behavior was preventing them from doing what they could to alleviate the situation. A China Southern employee said that passengers whom she had gotten on later flights after the ones they had originally booked were cancelled failed to show up when boarding was called for their new flights. Due to the snow and the violence, the airport closed again on the afternoon of 6 February.

Later that evening, 160 armed police officers arrived and restored order, per the emergency plan staff were finally able to implement. (Note: 按照机场方面的说法，5号飞机延误时，已经有大量旅客滞留并发生冲突，6号，机场启动应急预案，160名公安武警进驻机场维持秩序) The next morning the weather broke and the airport was able to reopen. Extra staff arrived to work the check-in counters; still, the airport was twice as busy as normal for that period, with 647 flights carrying the stranded passengers back to the cities where they worked. (Note: 7号早晨，郑州天气转晴，航班起降逐渐回复正常。郑州机场70多个开放的值机柜台排着长长的队伍，这一天郑州机场预计647架次起降，是平时的两倍。武警安保人员、地勤人员很多红着眼眶，连续工作24小时以上)

== Aftermath ==
Police did not report any arrests or criminal charges resulting from the riots, leaving some Chinese microbloggers in disbelief despite general public sympathy for the stranded flyers. "Are you allowed to vandalize an airport just because your plane is delayed?" one asked. "Why didn't the police take action?" Another said that passengers who had assaulted staff needed to be "locked away ... Where were the police?"

People's Daily, the newspaper of the Communist Party, similarly criticized the airlines for not keeping up with the country's air transport infrastructure. "Timely flight departures, user-friendly customer service ... in fact, the requirements of air travelers are not high" it observed. " But why can airlines and airports not meet these basic requirements?" (Note: 因天气原因造成旅客滞留，进而引发冲突，在各地的机场都不是头一回。及时的航班动态、人性化的补偿服务，其实，旅客的要求并不高。但为何航空公司和机场却无法满足这些基本要求呢？)

Over a year after the riot, Jamie Kenny, foreign correspondent for Abu Dhabi's The National, wrote that it followed the patterns of many other such "mass incidents", as Chinese authorities refer to occasions when citizens, angry about violations of their rights or official inattention to their concerns, gather together in large groups to protest, often destructive. "In China, people who go through the established means of grievance resolution may find themselves beaten up by hired thugs, kidnapped by 'interceptors' sent by local authorities on their way to petition in Beijing or incarcerated in illicit 'black jails'" he wrote. "On the other hand, if you gather thousands of people, assemble outside the local government and start burning police cars—then you get a respectful hearing."

In a 2016 story that described the quality of Chinese domestic air travel as still low, with many of the country's major airports still reporting minimal improvements, if any, in on-time departure rates, the BBC's Capital noted that the airline industry was beginning to make some progress in working with the military to open up more airspace to commercial flights. In 2015 the joint commission of China's Central Military Commission and the State Council had agreed to increase the amount of airspace open to civil aviation to 33%, with varying conditions, below 1,000 metres (3,300 ft) in altitude. While this move will not affect intercity air travel, instead opening up space for helicopter tours and emergency services, the long-term plan is to extend this opening to airspace below 3,000 metres (9,800 ft), roughly similar to the U.S.

== See also ==
- 2014 in aviation
- 2014 in China
- List of air rage incidents
- List of riots
