= Zhengzhou Xinzheng International Airport =

Airport serving Zhengzhou, Henan, China

Zhengzhou Xinzheng International Airport 郑州新郑国际机场

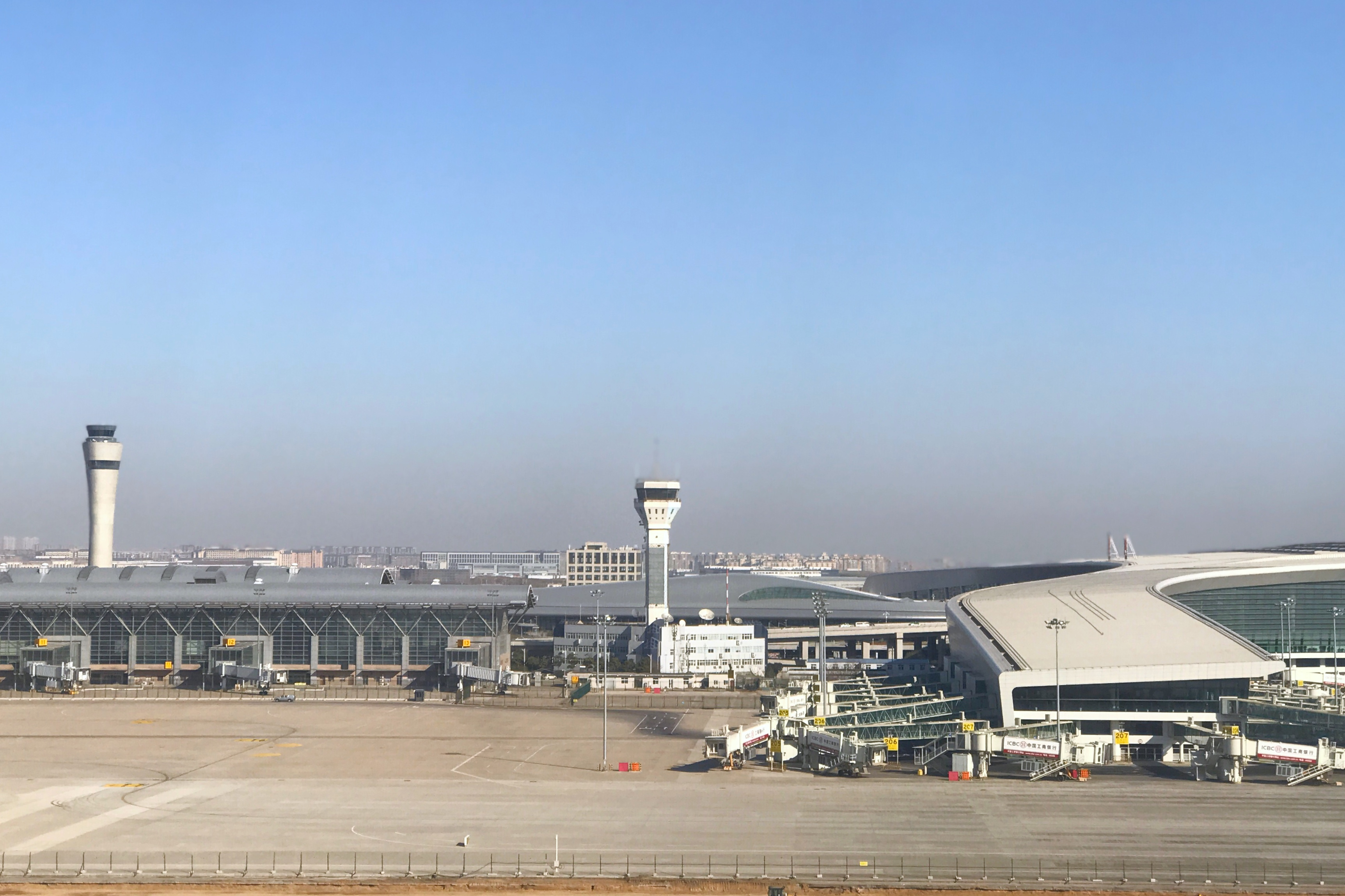
- IATA: CGO; ICAO: ZHCC

Summary
- Airport type: Public
- Operator: Henan Airport Group
- Serves: Zhengzhou
- Location: Xuedian and Mengzhuang, Xinzheng, Henan, China
- Opened: 28 August 1997; 29 years ago
- Hub for: Cargolux; China Southern Airlines
- Focus city for: Shenzhen Airlines
- Operating base for: Lucky Air
- Elevation AMSL: 151 m (495 ft)
- Coordinates: 34°31′11″N 113°50′27″E
- Website: www.zzairport.com

Maps
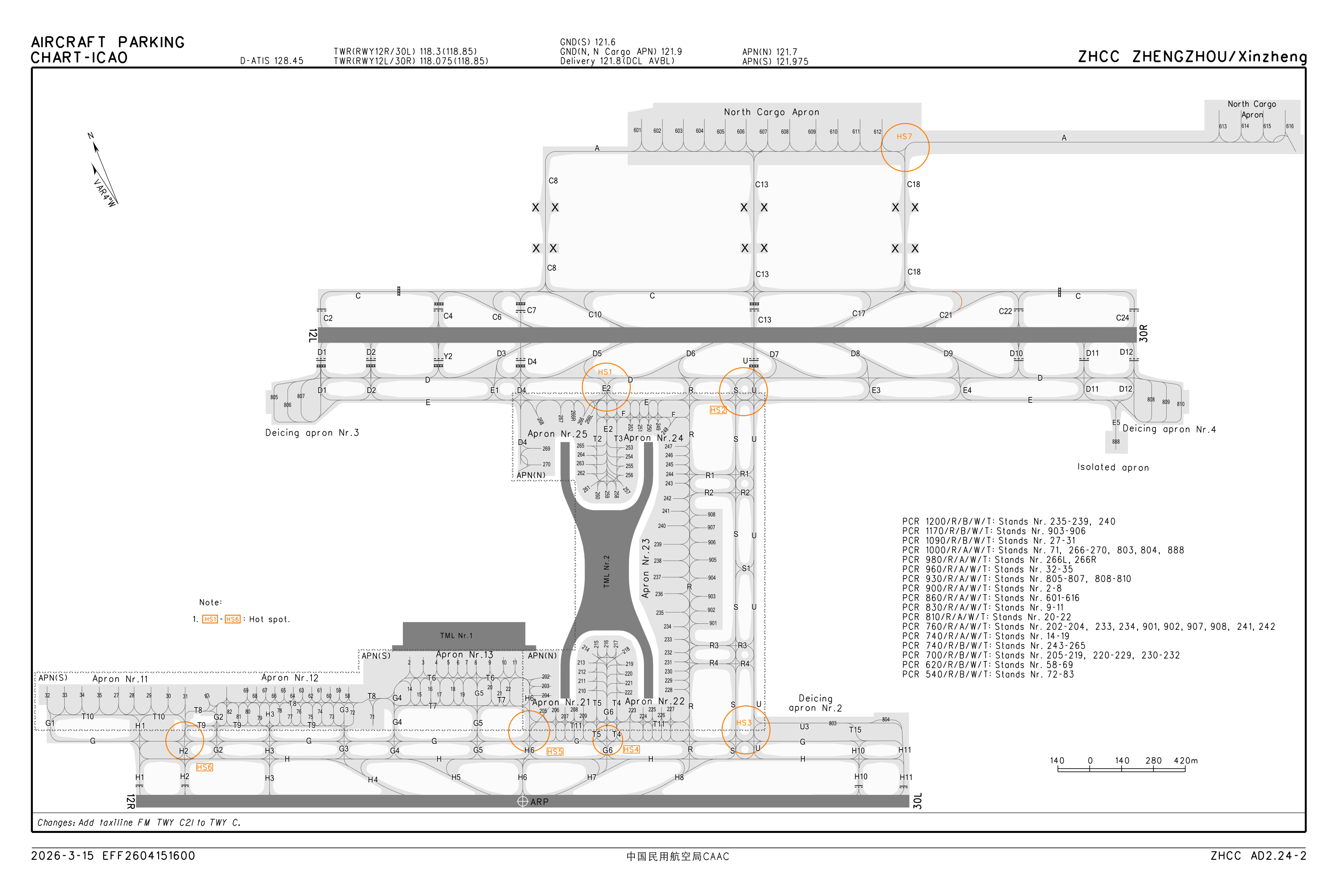
- CAAC airport chart

- Location in Henan Location in China

Runways
Direction	Length		Surface
Direction	m	ft	Surface
12R/30L	3,400	11,155	Asphalt
12L/30R	3,600	11,811	Concrete

Statistics (2025)
- Passengers: 29,191,990 ▲2.4%
- Cargo (metric tonnes): 1,033,397.3 ▲25.2%
- Aircraft movements: 222,362 ▲1.9%

Zhengzhou Xinzheng International Airport
- Simplified Chinese: 郑州新郑国际机场
- Traditional Chinese: 鄭州新鄭國際機場
Transcriptions
Standard Mandarin
- Hanyu Pinyin: Zhèngzhōu Xīnzhèng Guójì Jīchǎng

Zhengzhou Xinzheng International Airport (IATA: CGO, ICAO: ZHCC) is an international airport owned and operated by Henan Airport Group serving Zhengzhou, the capital of South Central China's Henan province.

The airport is located in Xinzheng, 37 kilometres (23 mi) southeast of downtown Zhengzhou. It was opened on 28 August 1997, replacing its predecessor, the now-demolished Dongjiao Airport. The airport is the largest international airport in Henan and serves as a main gateway for the province and the central plain area.

The airport is operated by Henan Airport Group and is a hub for Cargolux, as well as a focus city for China Southern Airlines, Shenzhen Airlines, West Air, Lucky Air, and Donghai Airlines. In 2025, it is the 17th-busiest airport by passenger traffic in mainland China with 29,191,990 passengers, and the sixth busiest airport in terms of cargo traffic nationwide. As of 2018, the airport is the busiest airport in central China in both passenger and cargo traffic.

Its IATA code "CGO" is derived from Zhengzhou's former romanization Chengchow.

== History ==
=== Early development ===
The former international airport of Zhengzhou, known as Zhengzhou Dongjiao Airport, was built in 1956. However, the airport, which had a 2,400 meter long and 45 meter wide runway, capable of handling airliners as large as a Boeing 767, was too close to the city center, worsening the air and noise pollution, especially from jet-powered planes like the Trident and Boeing 737. Development of many buildings in the area worsened the dire situation, thus risking aircraft-related accidents. Hence, to meet the demand of city development, a plan to build a new airport in Xuedian Township, Xinzheng to replace the old Dongjiao Airport was approved in 1992. The new airport was originally named Zhengzhou Xuedian Airport (Chinese: 郑州薛店机场) after the township of its location and was later changed to the current name. Construction began in 1993 and the new airport was opened on 28 August 1997 with a terminal of 45,900 square meters and a runway (Runway 12R/30L) of 3,400 m. The designed capacity of the terminal was 3.8 million passengers a year. All the flights of Dongjiao Airport were transferred to the new airport. Dongjiao Airport was later demolished to build the Zhengdong New Area CBD on its site.

In 2000, the airport was approved by the state council to become the 21st international airport in China.

From 2005 to 2007, the original terminal underwent a major expansion and renovation. The new terminal (current Terminal 1) has an area of 128,000 square meters and was opened on 29 December 2007.

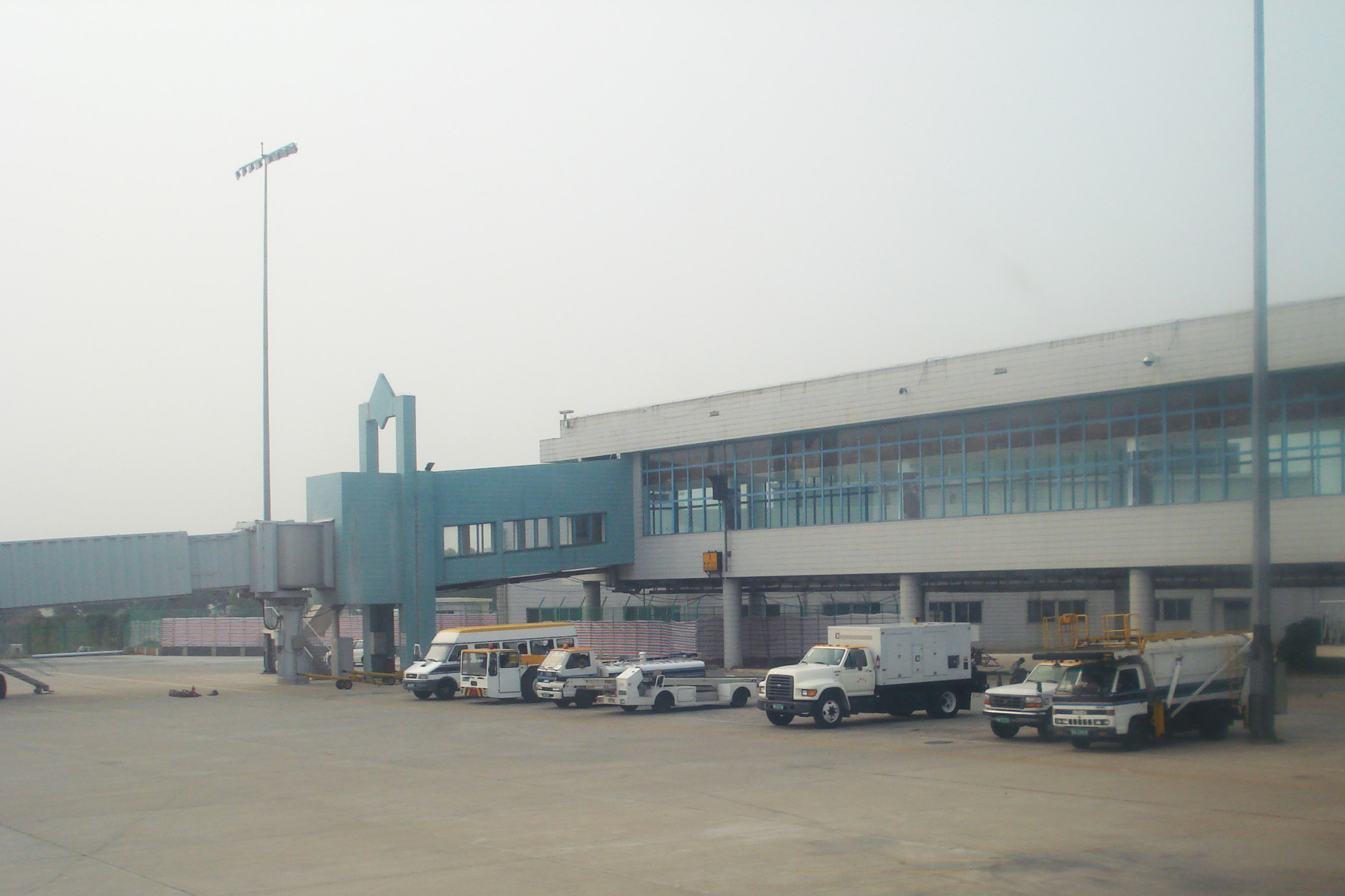
The original terminal in 2006 (now renovated into Terminal 1)

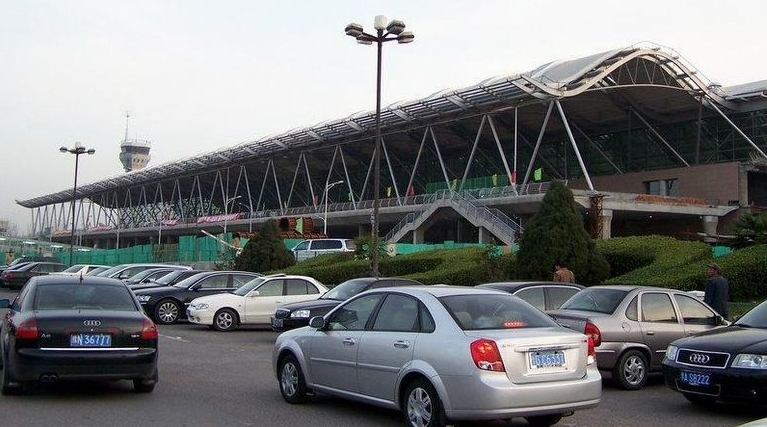
Terminal 1 under renovation in 2007

=== Phase II expansion ===
In 2013, the state council approved the expansion project of the airport, including a new terminal (Terminal 2), the second runway (Runway 12L/30R) and a ground traffic center (GTC), in alignment with its first airport-based economy zone (Zhengzhou Airport Economy Zone). The construction started in 2012, and was finished in 2015. Terminal 2 was opened on 19 December 2015 together with the GTC, and the second runway was opened on 7 January 2016, making the airport the first with two terminals and two runways in central China.

=== Recent development ===
After Foxconn Zhengzhou (the main production base for iPhone, located just to the north of the airport) was put into operation in 2010, the cargo transport of the airport has been booming. Between 2010 and 2017, the cargo volume handled by the airport increased from 85,798.1 to 502,714.8 metric tonnes, growing by 34 percent yearly on average, making it the seventh busiest airport in China by cargo traffic.

Long-haul and intercontinental passenger services from the airport also began to emerge in recent years. In late 2015 Emirates announced it would begin service from Dubai to Zhengzhou via Yinchuan from May 2016, as part of the airline's expansion plans in China. This is Zhengzhou's first connection to the Middle East. The service started from 3 May 2016 and stopped from November 2018. On 11 November 2016, Sichuan Airlines launched non-stop flights to Vancouver. It is the first regular non-stop intercontinental passenger service for the airport. Non-stop flight service to Melbourne were initiated by Jetstar on 6 December 2017. This was the first air route to Australia from the airport.

The airport rail link services between Zhengzhou city center and the airport became available after the completion of the ground traffic center in 2015, including the Zhengzhou–Xinzheng Airport intercity railway, which started operations from 31 December 2015 and served as an express link, and Zhengzhou Metro Chengjiao line, which started operations from 12 January 2017.

In 2017, the airport surpassed Wuhan Tianhe International Airport and Changsha Huanghua International Airport in terms of passenger traffic, making it the busiest airport in central China in both passenger and cargo traffic.

== Infrastructure ==
=== Terminal 1 (closed) ===
The current Terminal 1 was opened on 29 December 2007, after the expansion and renovation of the former terminal, which was opened in 1998. It covers an area of 128,000 square metres (1,380,000 sq ft) and has 14 gates with jet bridges. The roof of Terminal 1 is shaped like waves.

After the opening of Terminal 2, it was closed as a future reserve and temporarily transformed into an exhibition hall.

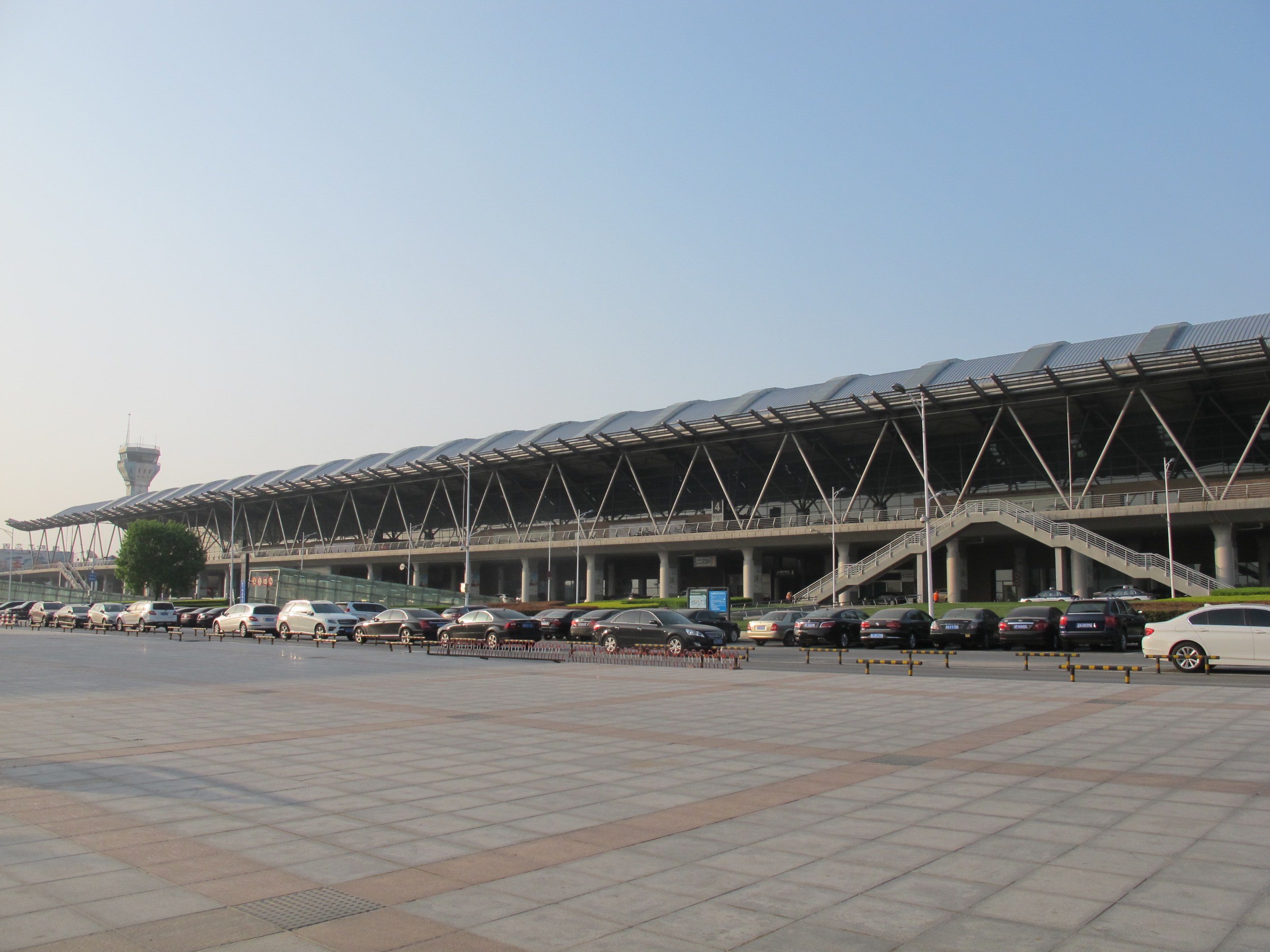
Terminal 1 in 2013

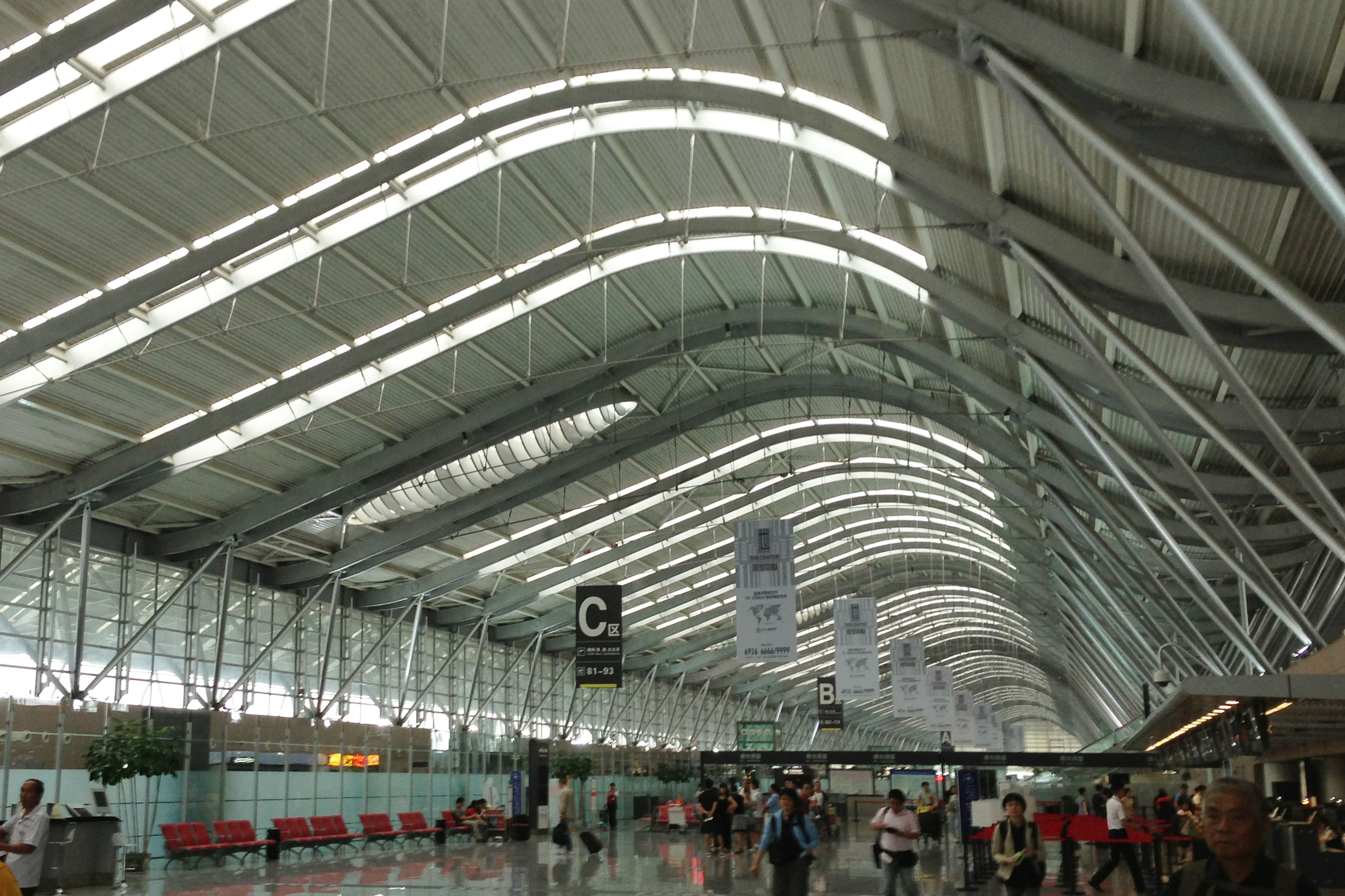
Departure hall of Terminal 1 in 2013

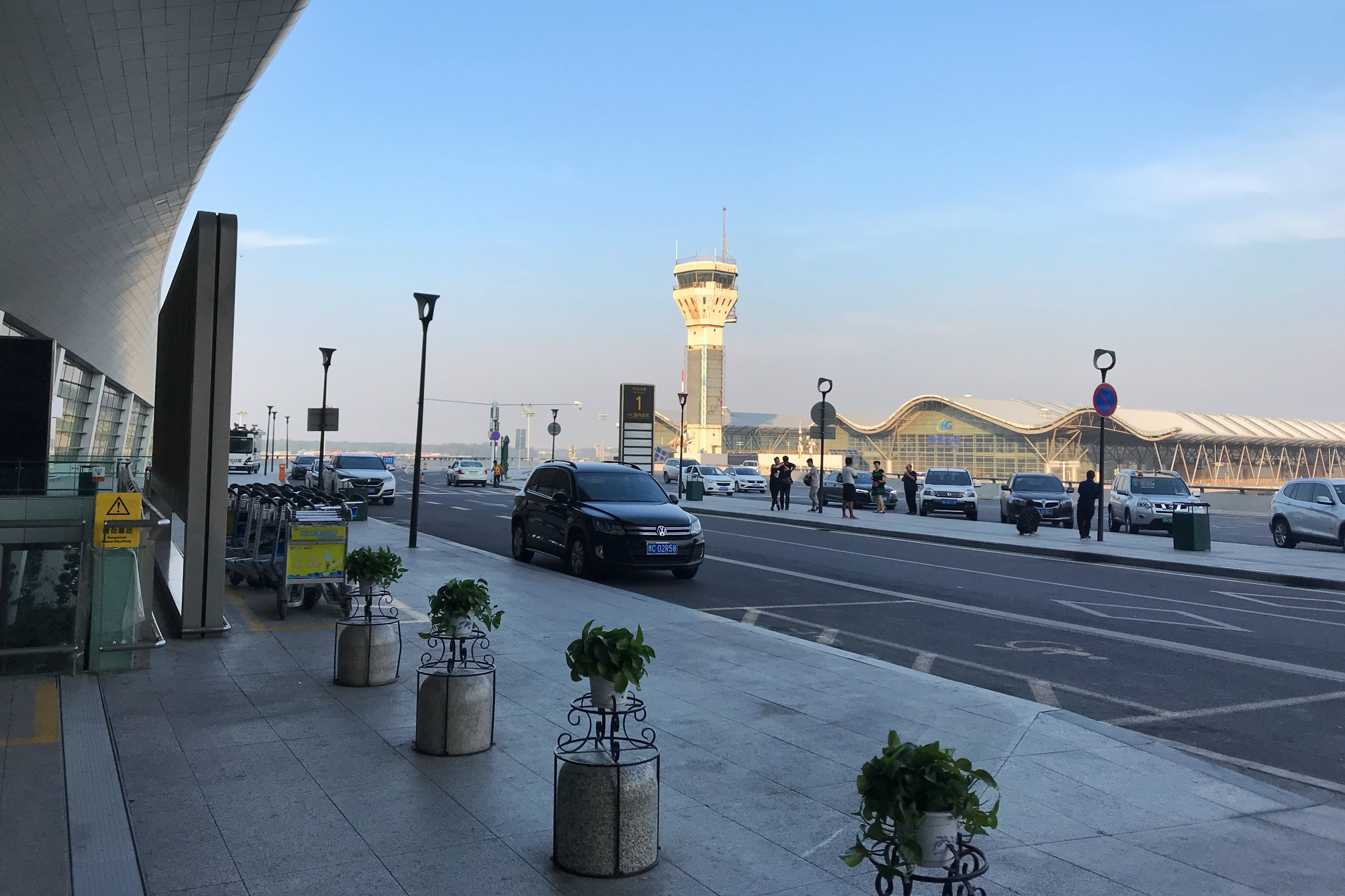
The closed Terminal 1 and the old air traffic control tower seen from Terminal 2

=== Terminal 2 ===
Terminal 2, the only terminal building in operation at present, is located to the northeast of Terminal 1. It was opened on 19 December 2015 with an area of 485,000 square metres (5,220,000 sq ft). Terminal 2 has an X-shaped layout with four piers seeing from above, which resembles and implies "opened arms to embrace the world". The northwest pier is for international flights and others are for domestic use.

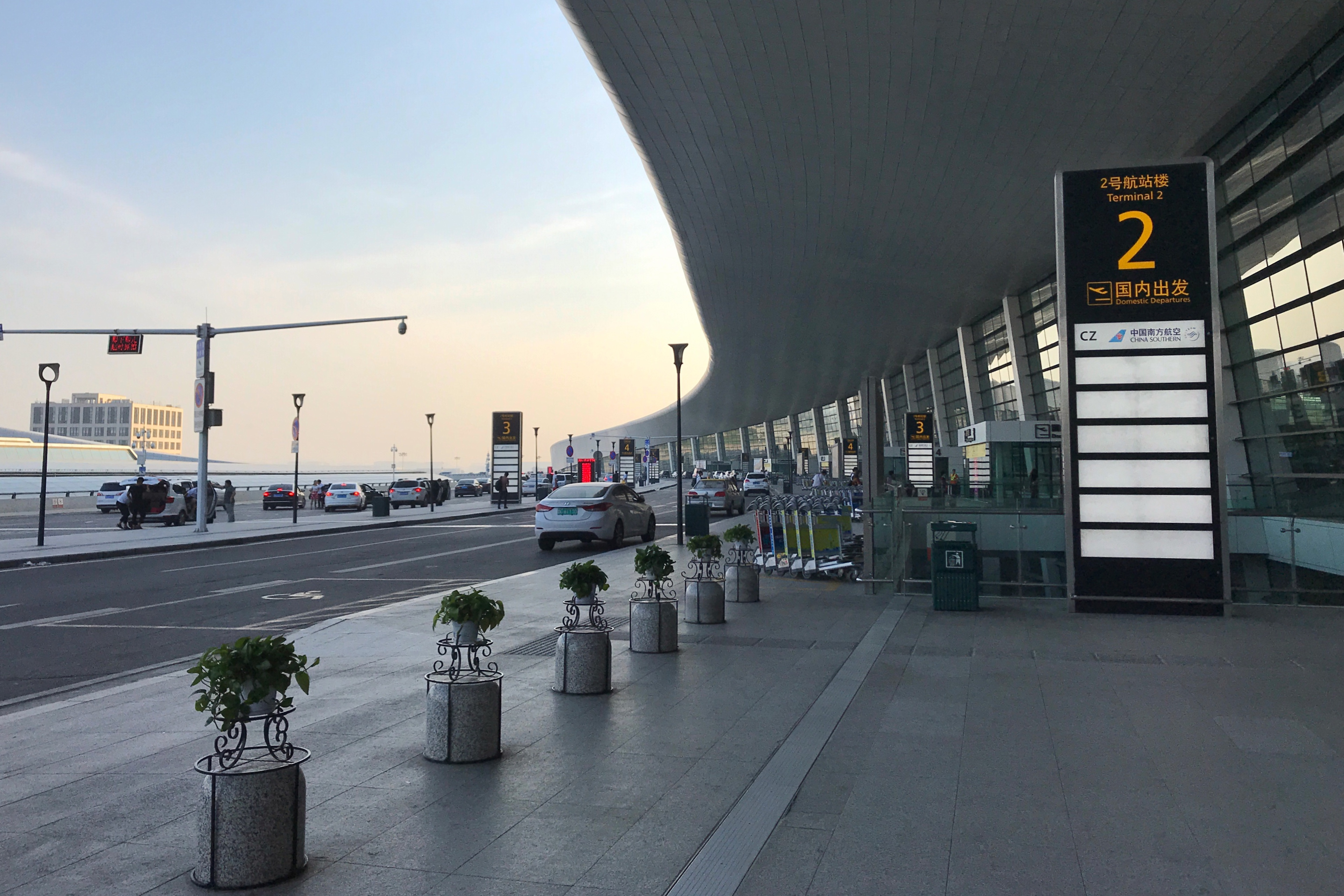
Entrance of Terminal 2

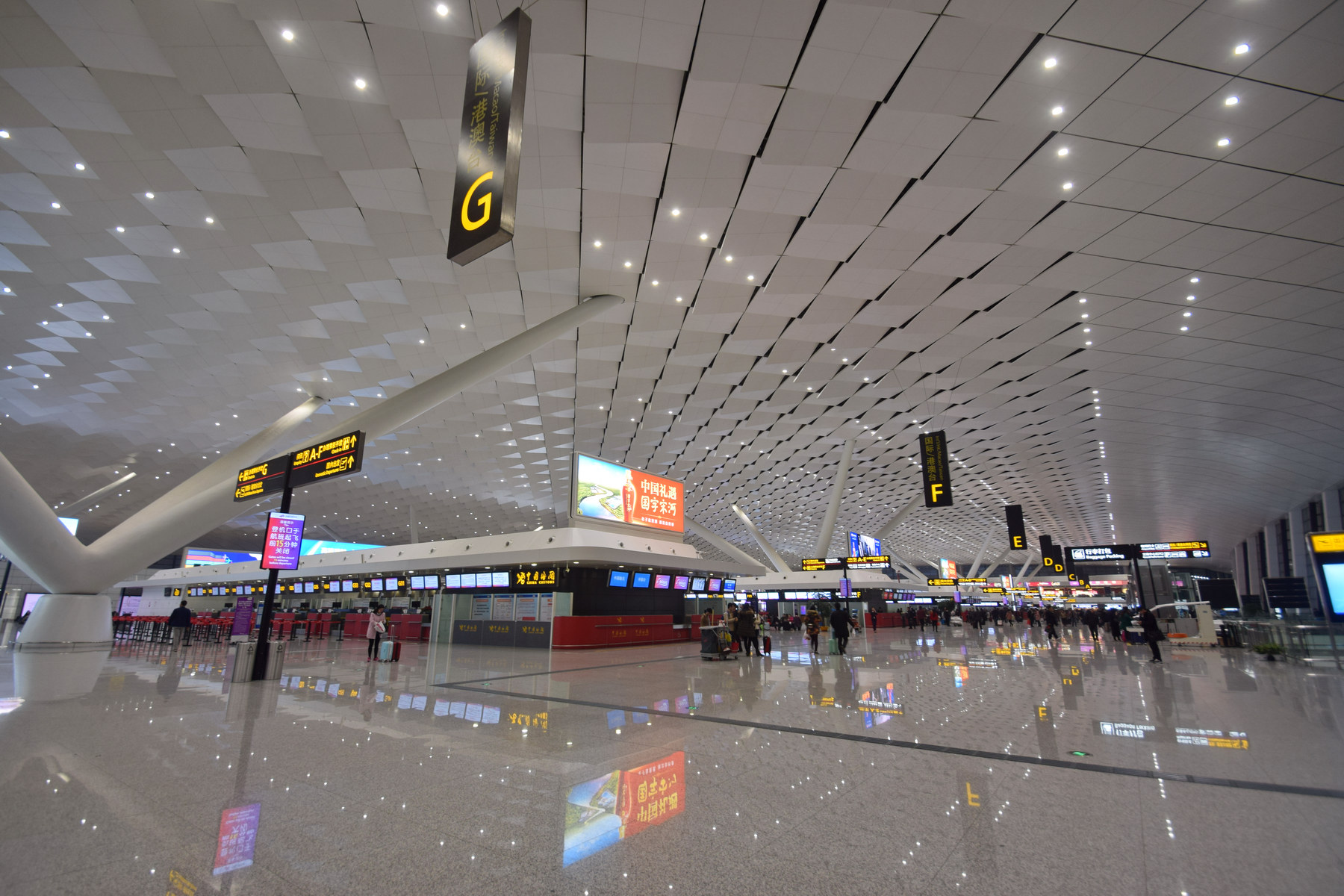
Departure hall of Terminal 2

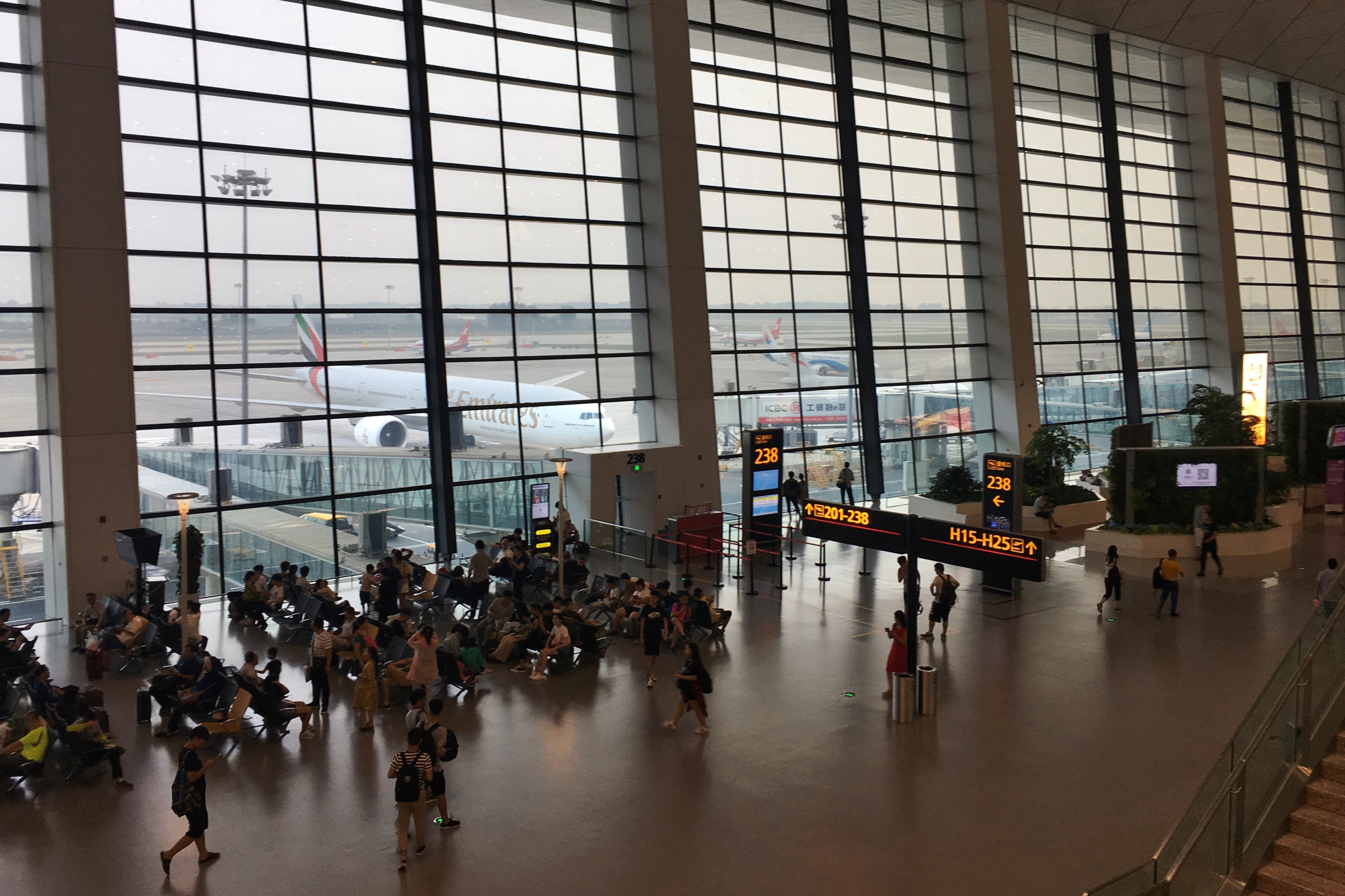
Waiting and boarding area of Terminal 2
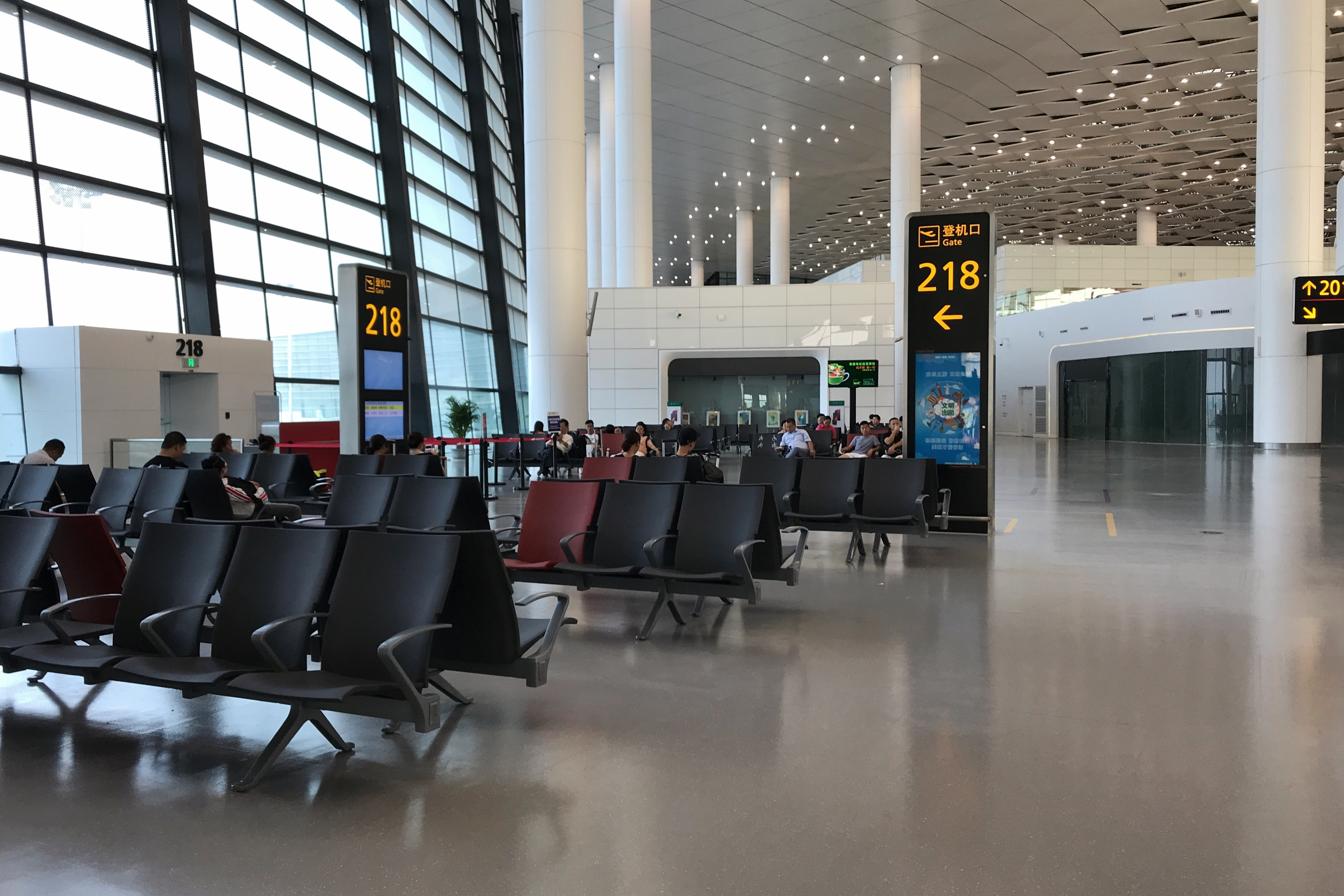
A boarding gate at Terminal 2

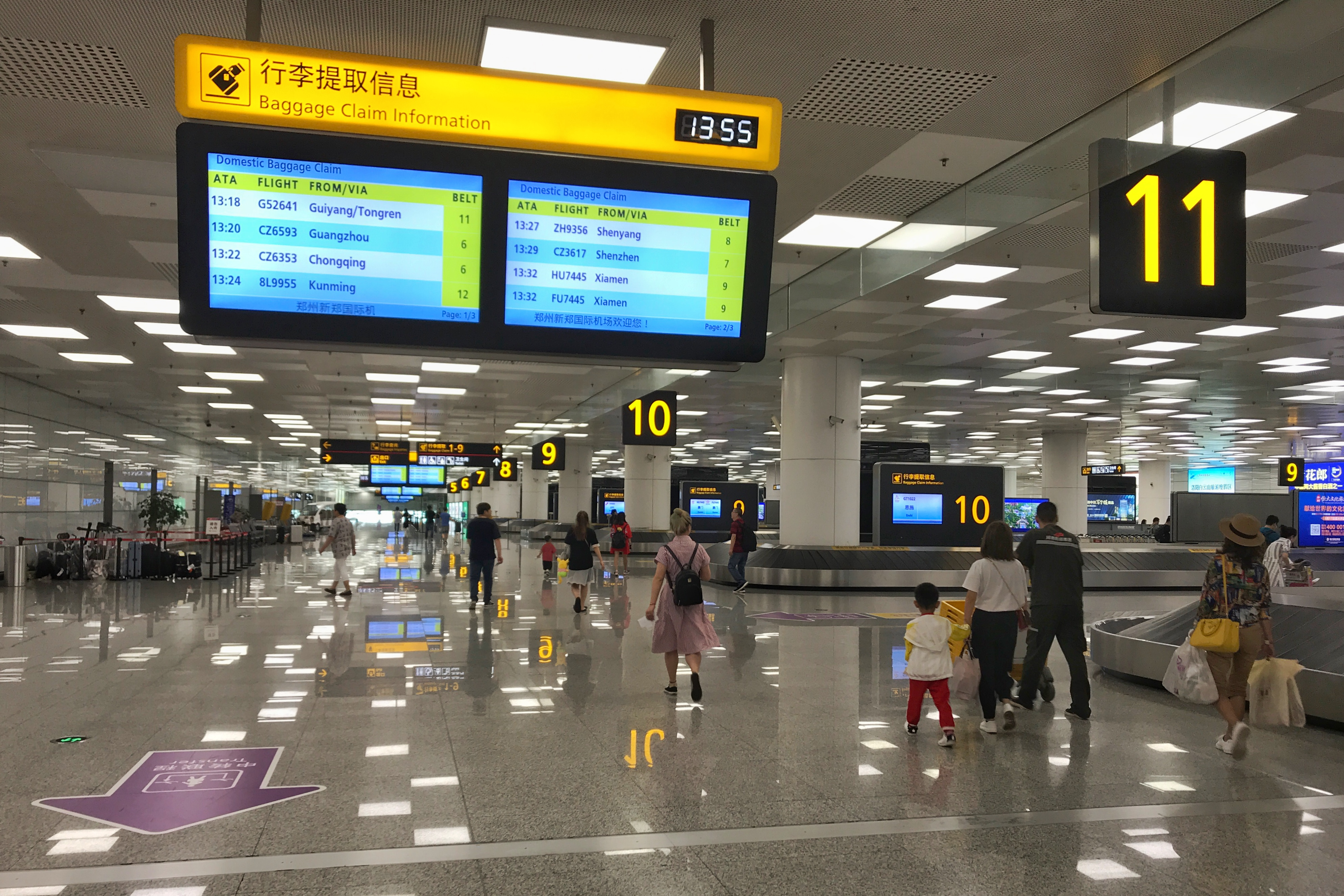
Baggage claim area of Terminal 2

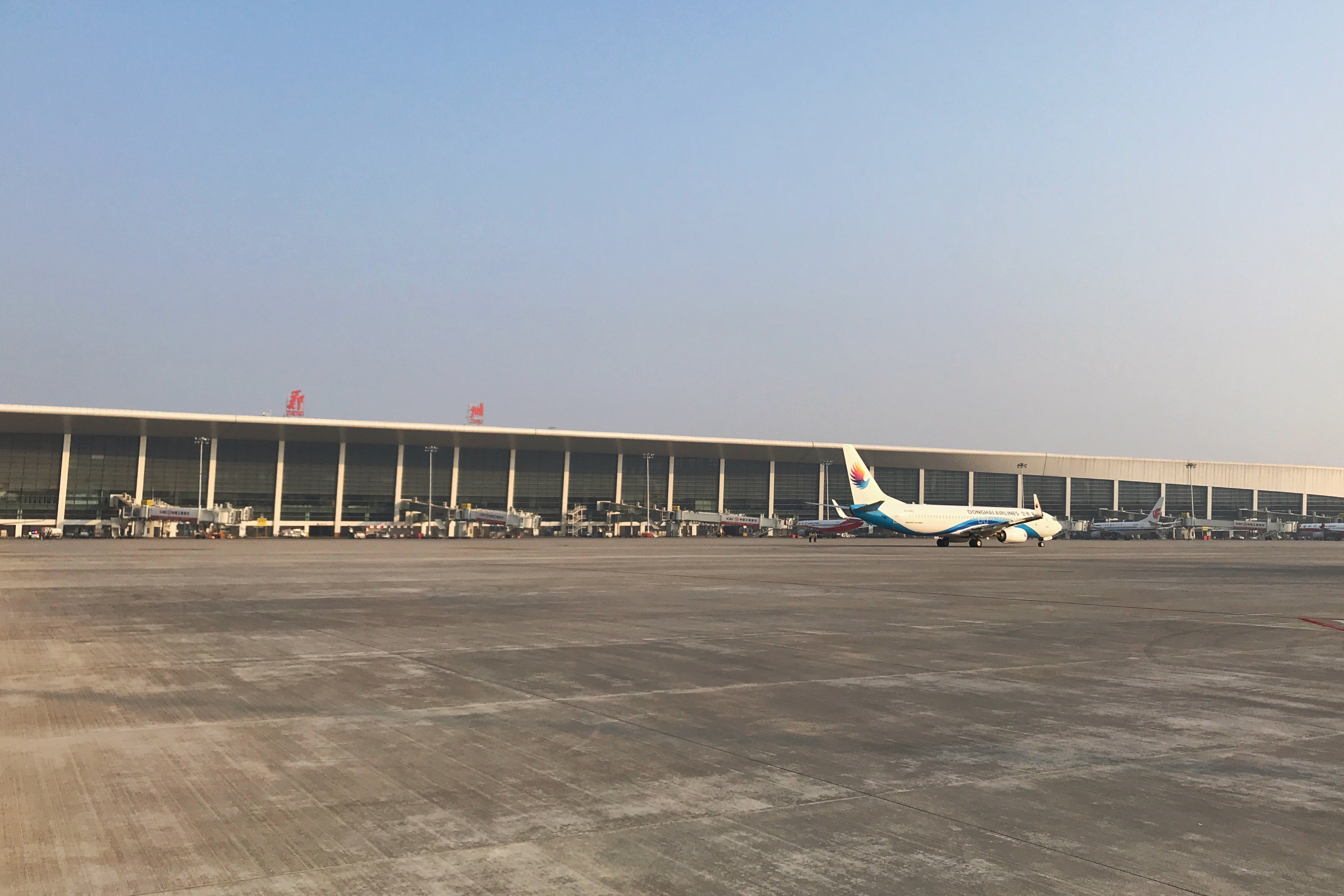
Terminal 2 seen from the apron

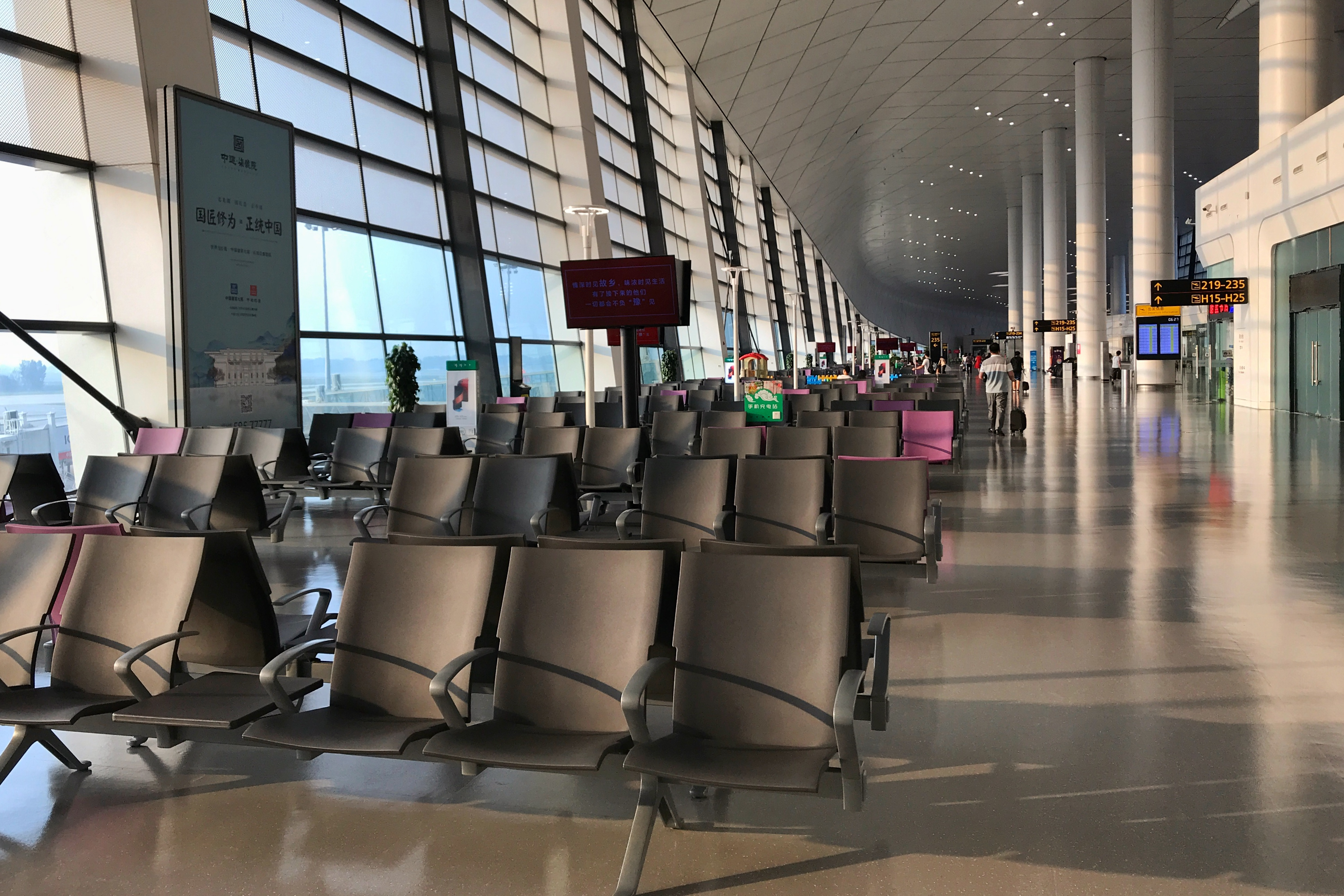
Waiting area of Xinzheng Airport

=== Ground traffic center ===
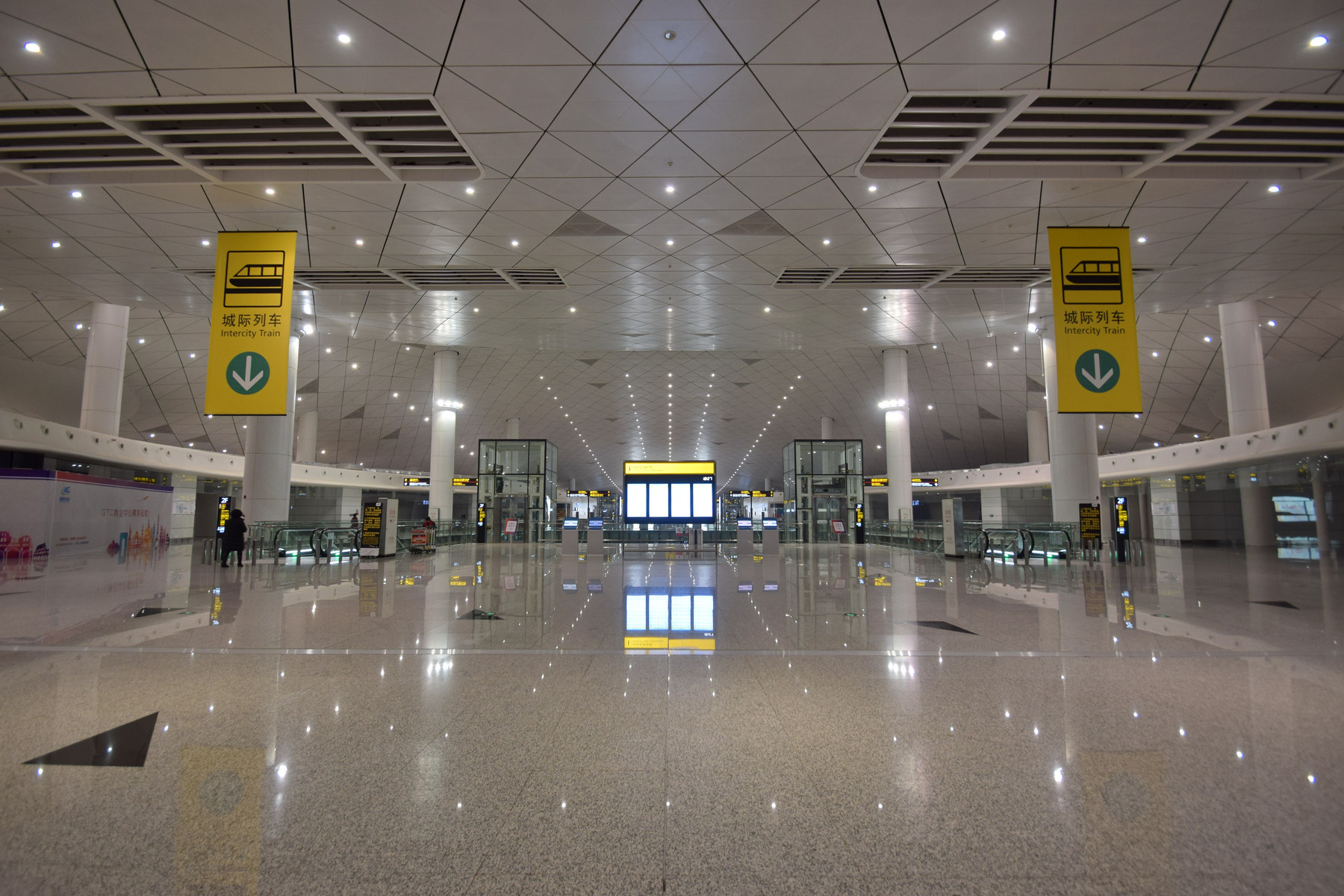
The concourse of the ground traffic center

The ground traffic center (GTC) was opened together with Terminal 2. It is to the west of Terminal 2 and is connected to the arrival hall of Terminal 2 by three corridors. The GTC has been designed to become a transportation hub for traffic between the airport and cities in central plains region, with an intercity train station and a metro station on the underground floors. Passengers can take taxis, intercity coaches, intercity trains and Zhengzhou Metro trains here.

=== Air-traffic control tower ===
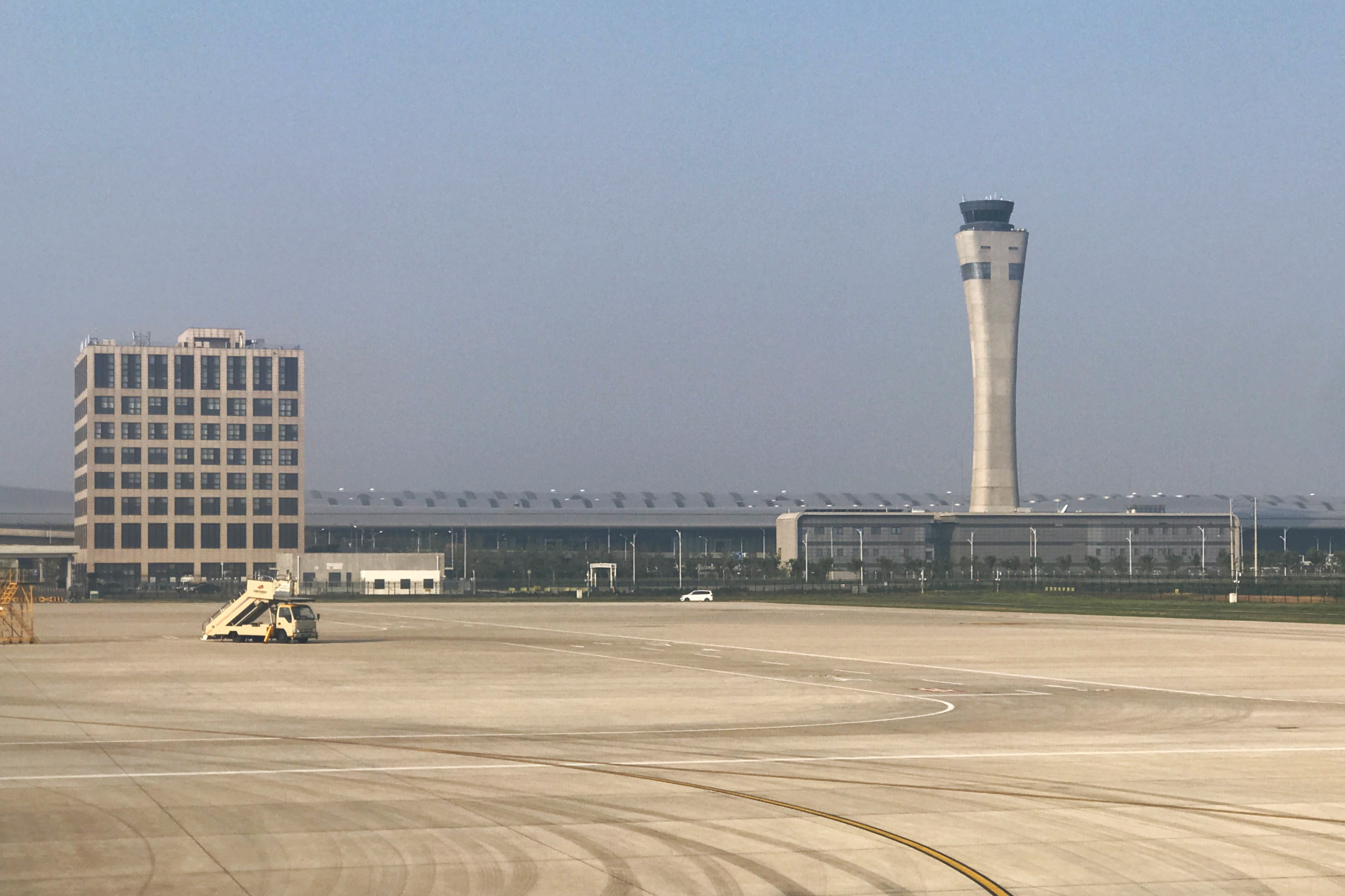
The air-traffic control tower

The new air-traffic control tower was put into use on 7 January 2016, together with the second runway. The control tower is 93.5 m (307 ft) in height and its shape resembles the Jiahu Gudi (bone flute) discovered in Henan.

=== Runways ===
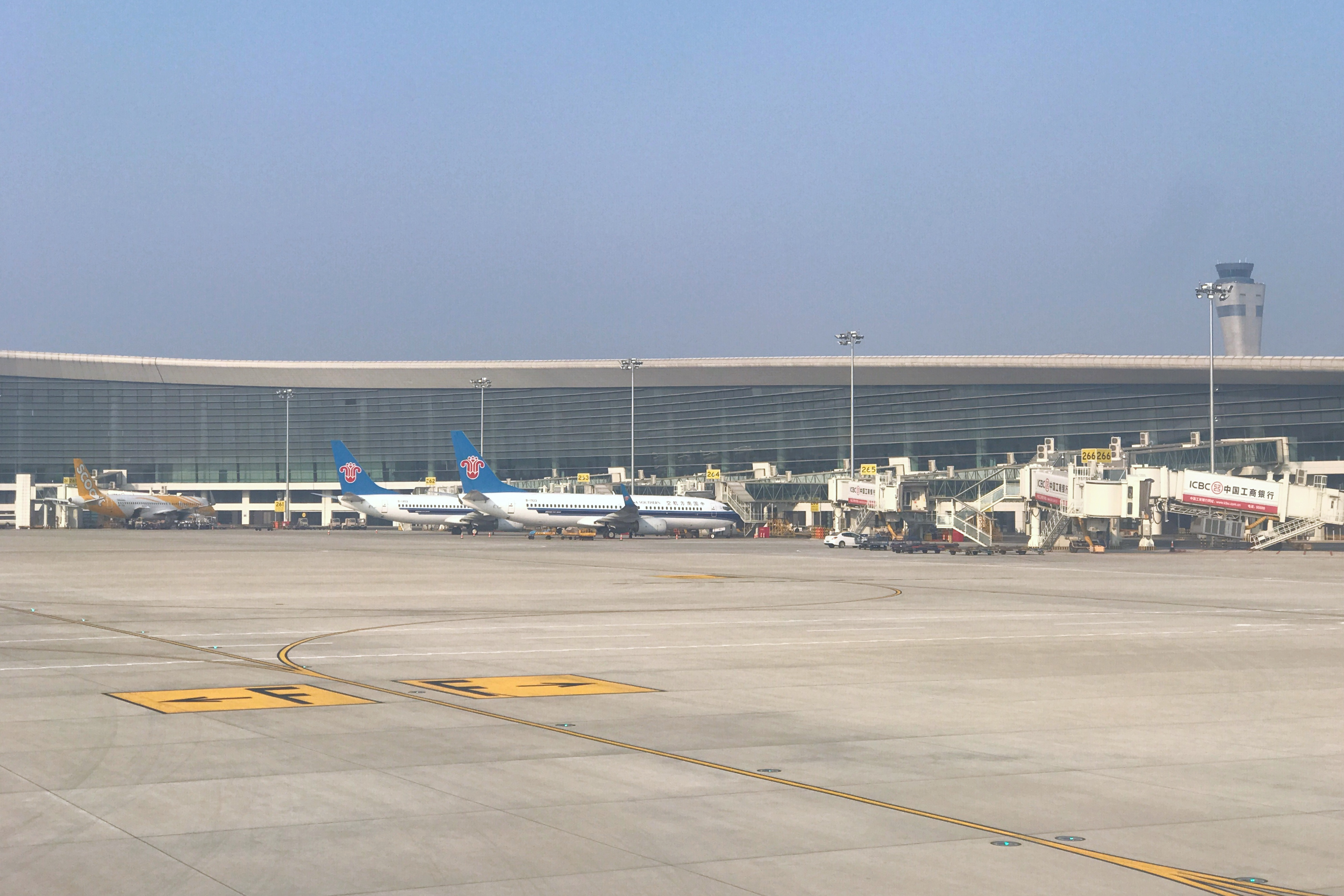
Aircraft parking at Terminal 2 international concourse

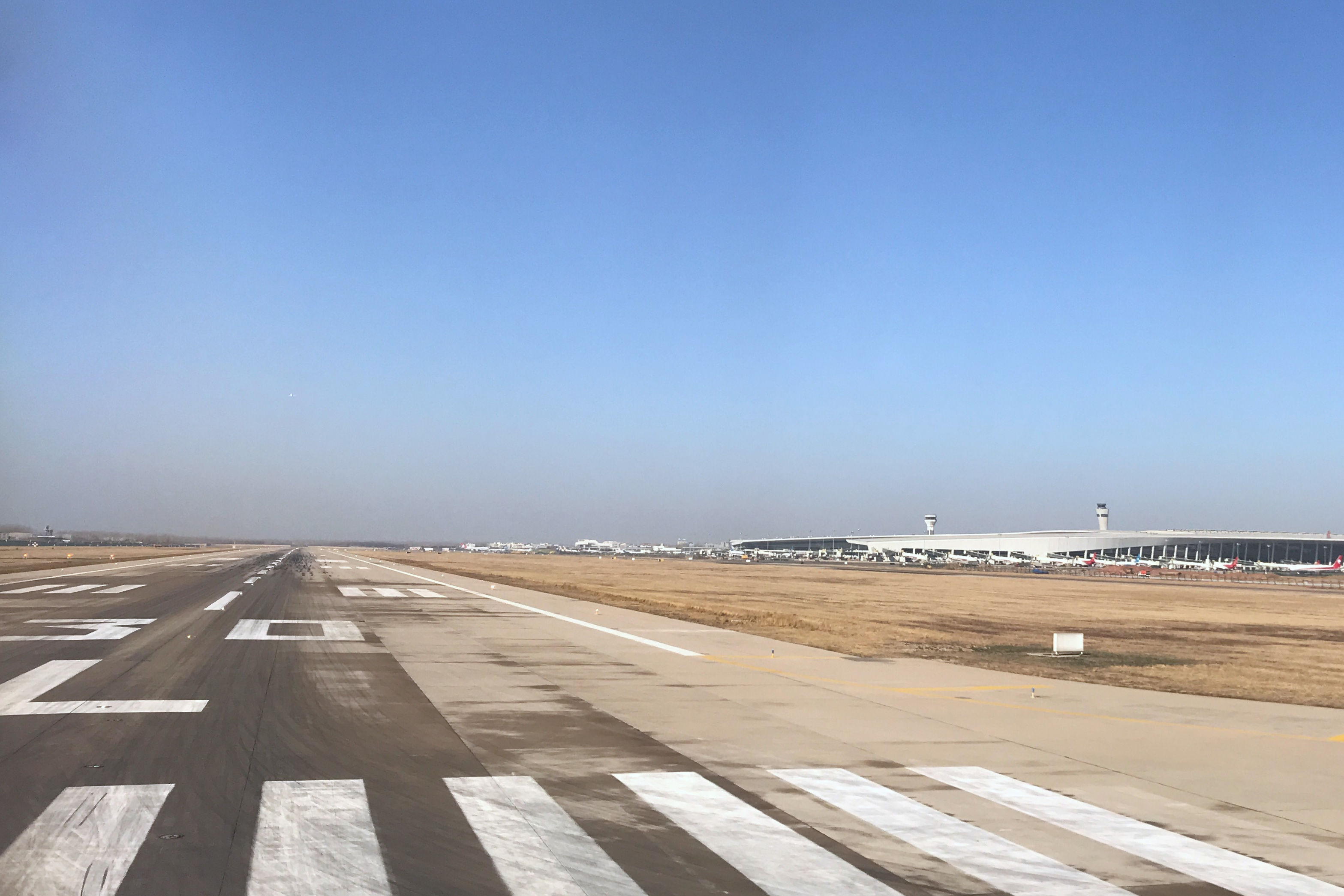
Runway 30L

The airport has two parallel runways:

- The south runway (3,400 m (11,200 ft) long and 45 m (148 ft) wide, opened in 1997)
- The north runway (3,600 m (11,800 ft) long and 60 m (200 ft) wide, opened in 2016)

The north runway has a Category II Precision Approach. Normally, the north runway (12L/30R) is used for landing while the south runway (12R/30L) is used for taking-off.

== Airlines and destinations ==
=== Passenger ===
In 2025, the airport's annual passenger throughput surpassed 20 million for the first time, ranking 17th nationwide. At present, 40 passenger airlines operate at the airport, serving 162 passenger routes (including 25 international and regional routes) and connecting to 86 cities. This network has effectively formed a hub system covering major cities across China as well as key destinations in East and Southeast Asia.

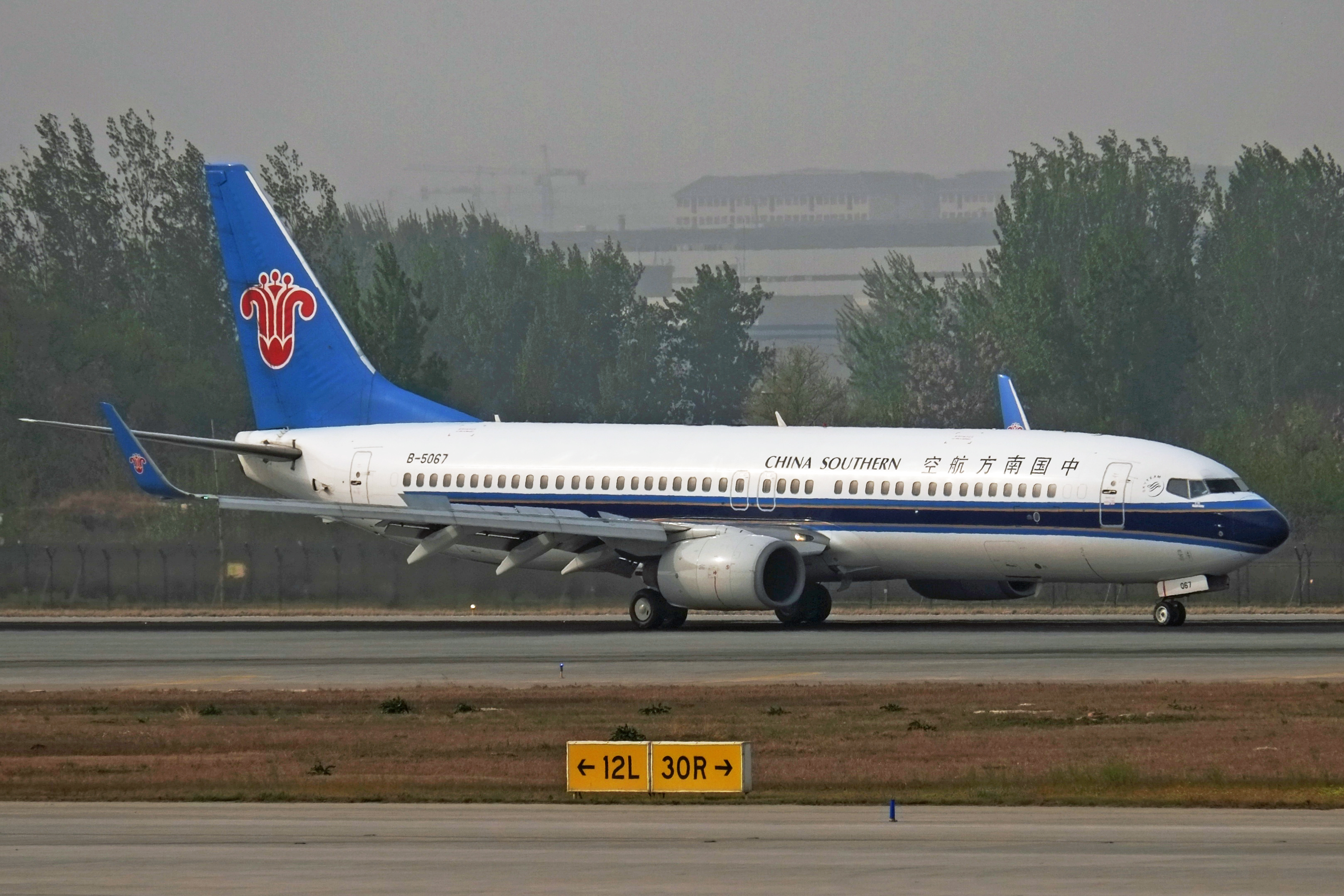
A China Southern Airlines Boeing 737-800 on runway 12L

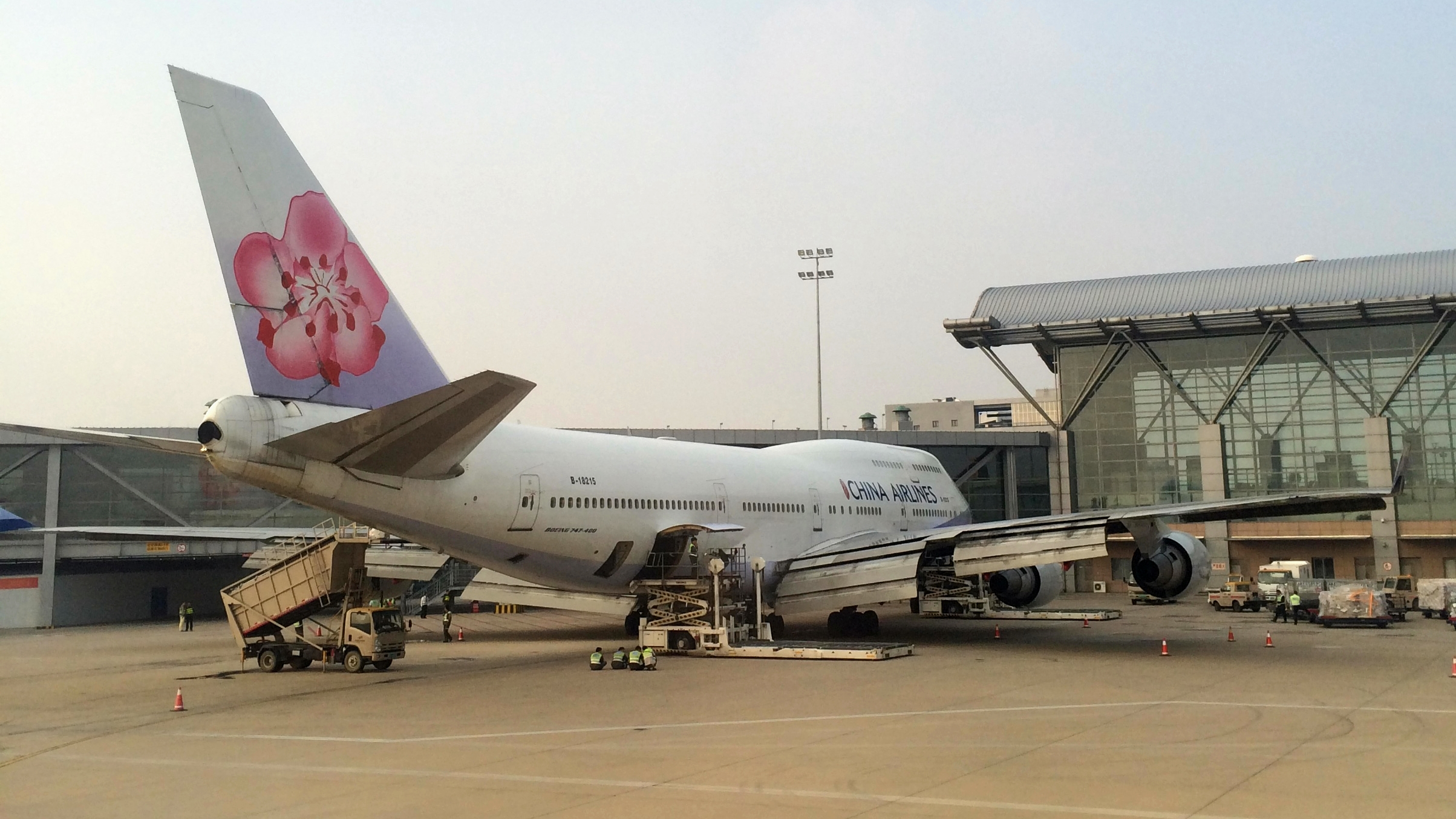
A China Airlines Boeing 747-400 parked at Terminal 1 in 2015

Airlines	Destinations
9 Air	Chengdu–Tianfu, Guangzhou, Guiyang, Haikou, Hohhot
Air Cambodia	Phnom Penh
Air China	Beijing–Capital, Chengdu–Shuangliu, Chengdu–Tianfu, Chongqing, Hangzhou, Shaoyang, Xiamen
Air Guilin	Enshi, Haikou, Tongren
Air Macau	Macau
Air Travel	Kunming
Batik Air Malaysia	Kuala Lumpur–International
Beijing Capital Airlines	Haikou, Hangzhou, Hohhot, Korla, Lijiang, Qingdao, Sanya, Ürümqi, Xiamen
Cathay Pacific	Hong Kong
Chengdu Airlines	Barkol, Chengdu–Tianfu, Fuzhou, Hohhot, Lhasa, Qitai, Tacheng, Tumxuk
China Eastern Airlines	Kunming, Lanzhou, Nanjing, Ningbo, Qingdao, Shanghai–Hongqiao, Shanghai–Pudong, Xiamen, Yantai
China Express Airlines	Anqing Tianzhushan Airport, Baotou, Chifeng, Chongqing, Dazhou, Dongying, Guangyuan, Guiyang, Quzhou, Yan'an, Zhoushan
China Southern Airlines	Bangkok–Suvarnabhumi, Baotou, Bayannur, Changchun, Chengdu–Tianfu, Chongqing, Fuzhou, Guangzhou, Guilin, Guiyang, Haikou, Hami, Hangzhou, Harbin, Hohhot, Hotan, Huangshan, Jieyang, Kashgar, Kuala Lumpur–International, Kunming, London–Gatwick, Luxembourg, Nanning, Ordos, Qingdao, Qinhuangdao, Sanya, Seoul–Incheon, Shanghai–Hongqiao, Shanghai–Pudong, Shenyang, Shenzhen, Taipei–Taoyuan, Tokyo–Narita, Ulanqab, Ürümqi, Wenzhou, Xiamen, Xining, Xinzhou, Yiwu, Yulin (Shaanxi), Zhangjiajie, Zhanjiang, Zhuhai, Hanoi
Chongqing Airlines	Chongqing, Harbin
Colorful Guizhou Airlines	Guiyang, Xichang, Yibin
Donghai Airlines	Datong, Hohhot, Nantong, Shangrao, Shenzhen, Zhongwei, Zhuhai
Eastar Jet	Seoul–Incheon
Fuzhou Airlines	Aksu, Fuzhou, Hami, Harbin, Hohhot, Xiamen
Hainan Airlines	Dalian, Guangzhou, Haikou, Hangzhou, Hohhot, Kashgar, Ningbo, Sanya, Shenzhen, Ürümqi, Wenzhou, Xiamen, Zhuhai
Jiangxi Air	Chengdu–Tianfu, Hangzhou, Harbin, Jiayuguan, Korla, Liuzhou, Shenzhen, Xiamen
Jin Air	Cheongju
Juneyao Air	Bayannur, Hangzhou, Milan–Malpensa, Shanghai–Pudong, Wuhai
Korean Air	Seoul–Incheon
Kunming Airlines	Kunming
Loong Air	Aksu, Aral, Guangzhou, Hangzhou, Karamay, Kashgar, Korla, Xining
Lucky Air	Chengdu–Tianfu, Dali, Dalian, Guiyang, Korla, Kunming, Lhasa, Lijiang, Luzhou, Ürümqi, Xining, Xishuangbanna
Nok Air	Bangkok–Don Mueang
Qingdao Airlines	Changchun, Chengdu–Tianfu, Dalian, Kuqa, Qingdao, Xishuangbanna
Scoot	Singapore
Shandong Airlines	Guilin, Guiyang, Haikou, Korla, Lanzhou, Ningbo, Qingdao, Ruoqiang, Sanya, Shenyang, Ürümqi, Xiamen, Yinchuan, Zhuhai
Shanghai Airlines	Changchun, Guiyang, Hangzhou, Jieyang, Kunming, Shanghai–Hongqiao, Shanghai–Pudong, Ürümqi, Wenzhou, Yinchuan, Zhoushan
Shenzhen Airlines	Dalian, Haikou, Harbin, Huizhou, Kunming, Lanzhou, Nanning, Quanzhou, Shenyang, Shenzhen, Wenzhou, Yinchuan, Zhoushan
Sichuan Airlines	Changchun, Chengdu–Shuangliu, Chengdu–Tianfu, Chongqing, Harbin, Kunming, Ürümqi, Xichang, Xishuangbanna
Spring Airlines	Changchun, Dalian, Shanghai–Pudong, Yining
Suparna Airlines	Haikou, Nanning, Shanghai–Pudong, Shenzhen, Yulin (Guangxi)
Thai Lion Air	Phuket
Thai VietJet Air	Bangkok–Suvarnabhumi
Tianjin Airlines	Guiyang, Haikou, Hailar, Hohhot, Huizhou, Sydney, Tianjin, Ürümqi, Yulin (Shaanxi), Zunyi–Xinzhou
Urumqi Air	Aksu, Bole, Fuzhou, Hotan, Kashgar, Lanzhou, Ningbo, Quanzhou, Ürümqi, Yining, Zhanjiang
West Air	Aksu, Bangkok–Suvarnabhumi, Beihai, Chongqing, Dalian, Fuzhou, Ganzhou, Golmud, Guangzhou, Guiyang, Haikou, Harbin, Hohhot, Huizhou, Jeju, Jieyang, Kashgar, Korla, Kunming, Lhasa, Lijiang, Nanning, Sanya, Shenzhen, Ürümqi, Wenzhou, Xiamen, Xiangxi, Xining, Zhongwei, Zhuhai, Zunyi–Maotai
XiamenAir	Dalian, Fuzhou, Hangzhou, Harbin, Hohhot, Lanzhou, Quanzhou, Ürümqi, Xiamen, Xining, Yinchuan
Xizang Airlines	Lhasa, Xining

=== Cargo ===
Currently, the airport has opened 70 all-cargo routes, connecting 32 countries and 73 cities worldwide, and its annual cargo and mail throughput ranks among the top in the country.

Airlines	Destinations
Aerotranscargo	Dubai–Al Maktoum
Air China Cargo	Amsterdam
Air Incheon	Seoul–Incheon
Awesome Cargo	Anchorage, Mexico City-AIFA, Seoul–Incheon
Cargolux	Anchorage, Atlanta, Chicago–O'Hare, Edmonton, Komatsu, London–Stansted, Luxembourg, Novosibirsk, Zaragoza
Cargolux Italia	Milan-Malpensa
Cathay Cargo	Hong Kong, Shanghai–Pudong
China Airlines Cargo	Nanjing, Taipei–Taoyuan
China Cargo Airlines	Shanghai–Pudong
China Postal Airlines	Nanjing, Seoul–Incheon, Shanghai–Pudong, Shijiazhuang
China Southern Cargo	Anchorage, Guangzhou
Compass Cargo Airlines	Liège, Sofia
Geosky	Türkmenabat
Hong Kong Air Cargo	Hong Kong, Tianjin
Korean Air Cargo	Seoul–Incheon, Xi'an
Longhao Airlines	Hanoi, Manila
Maersk Air Cargo	Chicago/Rockford
Mas Air	Mexico City-AIFA
My Freighter Airlines	Liège
Qatar Cargo	Doha
SF Airlines	Hangzhou, Seoul-Incheon, Shenzhen, Wuhan, Wuxi
Silk Way Airlines	Amsterdam, Baku, Maastricht
Sky Lease Cargo	Anchorage
Suparna Airlines Cargo	Amsterdam, Anchorage, Chicago–O'Hare, Frankfurt–Hahn, Hangzhou
Tianjin Air Cargo	Bangkok–Suvarnabhumi
UPS Airlines	Seoul–Incheon
YTO Cargo Airlines	Tokyo–Narita

== Ground transportation ==
=== Highway ===
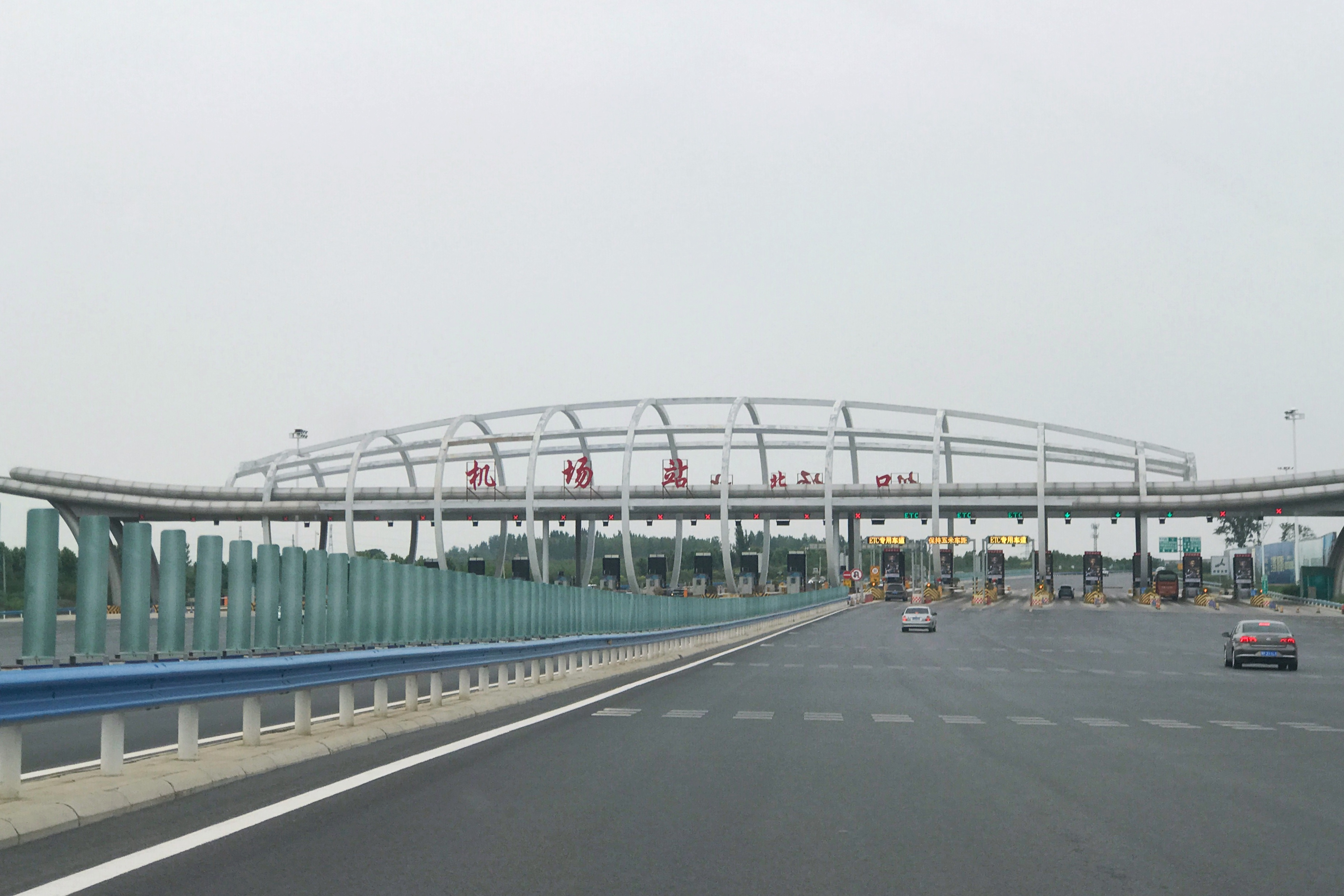
Airport toll station

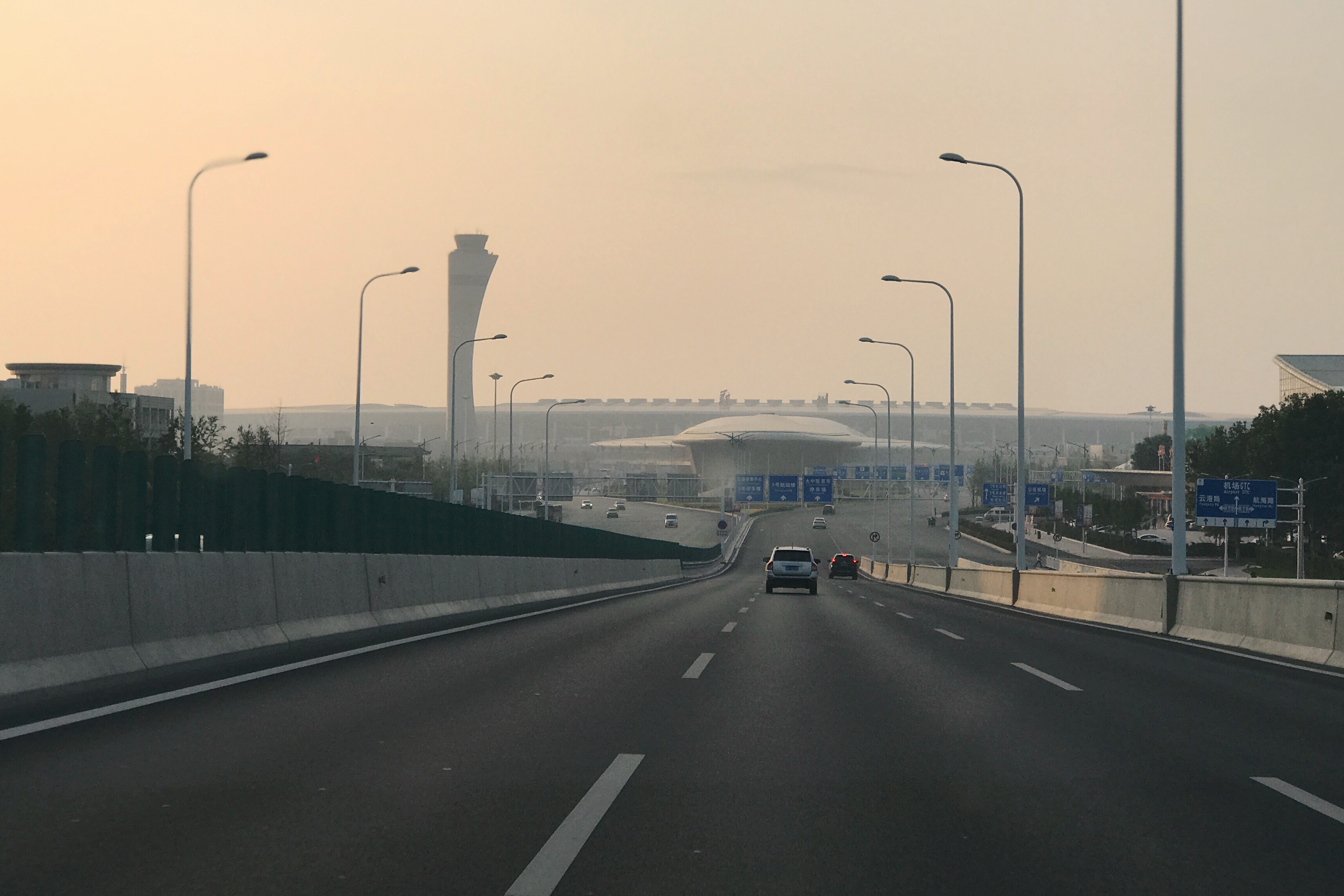
The 1.48 kilometres (0.92 mi) long Yingbin Elevated Road connects the airport with S1 and G4 expressways.

- S1 Zhengzhou Airport Expressway
- G4 Beijing–Hong Kong and Macau Expressway

Both expressways are connected to the airport via Yingbin Elevated Road.

=== Rail ===
Airport rail link is served by Zhengzhou–Xinzheng Airport intercity railway and Zhengzhou Metro Chengjiao line.

==== Intercity railway ====
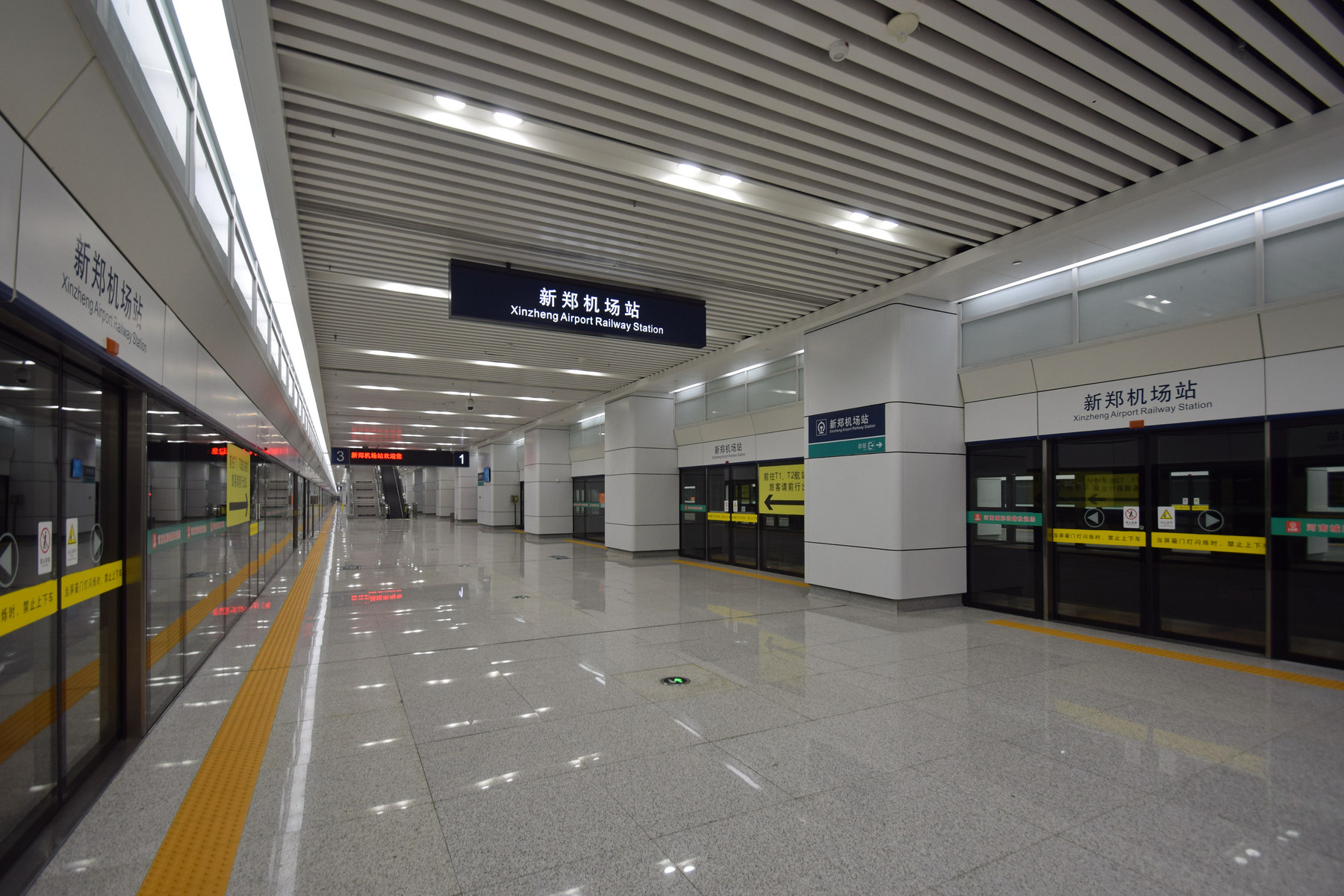
Platform of the Xinzheng Airport railway station

The Xinzheng Airport railway station is located in the GTC. The waiting hall and ticket offices are on the B2 floor and platforms are on the B3 floor. Intercity trains to Zhengzhou, Zhengzhou East, Jiaozuo and Songchenglu (Kaifeng) are in operation.

==== Metro ====
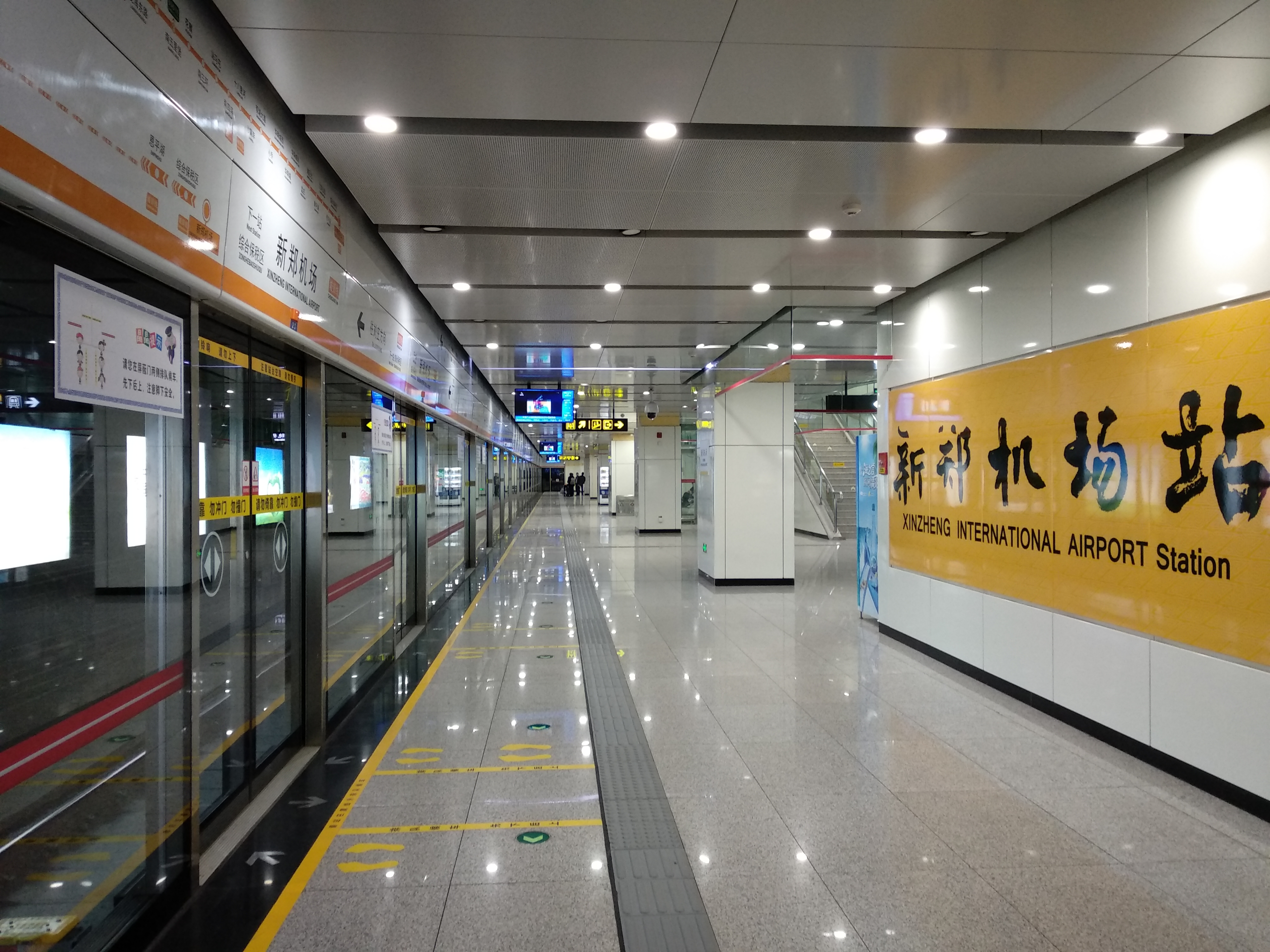
Platform of Xinzheng International Airport station (Zhengzhou Metro)

Trains of the Chengjiao Line of the Zhengzhou Metro connects the airport to downtown Zhengzhou using through services via Line 2.

=== Bus ===
==== Shuttle bus ====
There are several airport shuttle bus routes to various destinations in Zhengzhou. The bus station is on the first floor of Terminal 2.

Destination	Ticket price
Zhengzhou Central Coach Station	¥20
Civil Aviation Hotel	¥20
Longyuan Hotel	¥20
Zhengzhou East Railway Station	¥20
Zhengzhou Railway Station west plaza	¥20

==== Inter-city coach ====
The airport also offers inter-city coach services to and from other cities in the central plain region, including Luoyang, Kaifeng, Xuchang, Xinxiang, Nanyang, Anyang, Jiaozuo, Pingdingshan, Shangqiu, Zhoukou, Zhumadian, Heze, Changzhi, and Jincheng. Unlike the Zhengzhou routes, inter-city coaches depart from the GTC.

==== City bus ====
There are several bus routes, operated by Zhengzhou Bus Communication Corporation, serving the airport and neighbouring areas in the Zhengzhou Airport Economy Zone.

- 611: towards Shizu Road bus terminal
- 612: towards Yongzhou Road and Yuanling Road
- 613: towards Hang'an 2 Street and Jichang 6 Road
- 638: towards South gate of Zhengzhou Garden-Expo Park
- Y636: night service, towards Lingkong Street and Taihu Road

== Accidents and incidents ==
- On 4 February 2014, Joy Air Flight 1533, a Xian MA60 carrying 7 crew members and 37 passengers from Taiyuan Wusu International Airport to Zhengzhou Xinzheng International Airport had a mechanical failure on the landing gear while landing at Zhengzhou. The nose gear collapsed and the aircraft's nose cone hit the runway. No passengers or crew suffered any injuries.
- On 5 February 2014, heavy snowfall forced the airport to close for several hours in the afternoon and evening, leaving roughly 2,000 passengers stranded in the airport on one of the busiest travel days of the annual New Year. Many grew frustrated by the lack of information provided by airport or airline staff, and began damaging check-in desks and flight information displays, with some assaulting staff as well. The riot and further snow forced the airport to close again on the next day. Police eventually came to the scene and restored order (See Zhengzhou Airport riot).
- On 15 April 2018, Air China Flight 1350, an Airbus A321 from Changsha Huanghua International Airport to Beijing Capital International Airport was diverted to make an emergency landing at Zhengzhou Xinzheng International Airport. It was reported that a flight attendant was held hostage by a male passenger with a pen. No one suffered any injuries in this incident.

== See also ==
- List of airports in China
- List of the busiest airports in China
