= Xichang Qingshan Airport =

Xichang Qingshan Airport 西昌青山机场
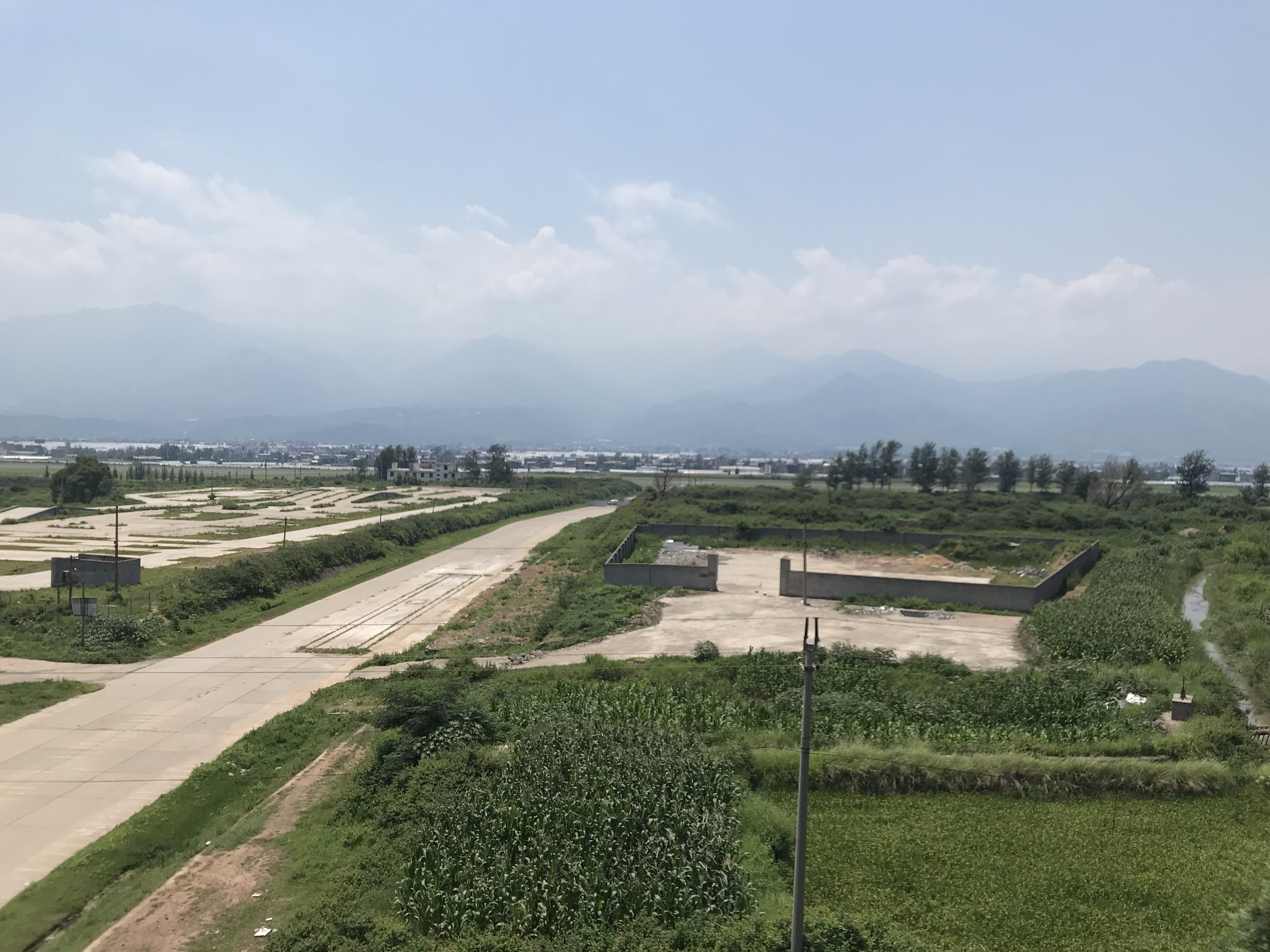
- IATA: XIC; ICAO: ZUXC

Summary
- Airport type: Military/Public
- Serves: Xichang, Sichuan
- Elevation AMSL: 1,562 m (5,125 ft)
- Coordinates: 27°59′21″N 102°11′04″E

Map
- Location of airport in Sichuan

Runways
Direction	Length		Surface
Direction	m	ft	Surface
18/36	3,600	11,811	Concrete

Statistics (2025)
- Passengers: 955,046
- Cargo (metric tons): 1,022.1
- Aircraft movements: 8,747

Xichang Qingshan Airport
- Simplified Chinese: 西昌青山机场
- Traditional Chinese: 西昌青山機場
Transcriptions
Standard Mandarin
- Hanyu Pinyin: Xīchāng Qīngshān Jīchǎng

Xichang Qingshan Airport (IATA: XIC, ICAO: ZUXC) is an airport serving Xichang, the seat of Liangshan Yi Autonomous Prefecture in Sichuan Province, China. The airport started an expansion project in February 2010.

== History ==
The history of Xichang Qingshan Airport can be traced back to Xichang Xiaomiao Airport and its predecessor, Xiaomiao Airport. Xiaomiao Airport was located on the Anning River Valley plain, north of Xiaomiao Township (now part of Chang'an Community, Xichang City), at the foot of Tianwang Mountain, 7 kilometers northwest of Xichang County. In 1932, to gain an advantage in the Sichuan warlord wars, a large amount of money was invested in the construction of Xiaomiao Airport. At that time, Xiaomiao Airport was just a muddy dam about the size of a football field, without any safety facilities.

Xiaomiao Airport was expanded in 1935, and upon completion, it was H-shaped, with two 50-meter-long and 19-meter-wide vertical runways and one 750-meter-long and 10-meter-wide horizontal runway. However, since its completion and expansion, the airport had never been put into use. In 1936, Chiang Kai-shek planned to have Yang Sen lead the 20th Army to garrison Xichang. In March of the same year, Yang Sen, commander of the 20th Army, arrived in Xichang, marking the first use of Xiaomiao Airport.

In 1937, with the outbreak of the Second Sino-Japanese War, the Nationalist government planned to expand Xiaomiao Airport. The following year, the airport was expanded to a 750x50 square meter dirt-brick road. After completion, a Ministry of Communications postal plane successfully completed its trial flight from Chongqing to Xichang, thus opening the Xichang-Chongqing air route. This marked the beginning of Xiaomiao Airport's important role in transmitting postal information.

In 1939, Xikang Province was established, and Xichang was under its jurisdiction. Due to the escalating War of Resistance against Japan, Chiang Kai-shek established his headquarters in Xichang and undertook a large-scale expansion of Xiaomiao Airport, reinforcing the runway to 1500 x 50 meters, constructing evacuation routes, and building dozens of aircraft shelters. These shelters were difficult to spot from the air or from a distance, so much so that even when Japanese aircraft bombed Xiaomiao Airport, they failed to detect the two fighter planes inside the shelters.

In August 1940, the U.S. military sent a ground crew squadron of over 300 men to the airport. From then on, U.S. military transport aircraft took off and landed at Xiaomiao Airport daily. In 1942, for strategic reasons, the U.S. government incorporated the Flying Tigers into the 10th Air Force of the U.S. Army Air Forces, making them the backbone of the U.S. Air Force Task Force in China. In March 1943, the Flying Tigers were reorganized into the 14th Air Force and ordered to be stationed at Xiaomiao Airport in Xichang, bringing with them a batch of bombers, transport planes, and ground crew. From then on, with the help and protection of the U.S. Allied forces, military transport routes were opened between Xichang and India, Xichang and Chongqing, and Xichang and Kunming. This made Xiaomiao Airport another important gateway for China's international connections, and due to its unique geographical location, it was highly concealed and difficult for the Japanese Air Force to detect.

After several expansions and repairs, Xiaomiao Airport had taken initial shape by 1944, with a 1,560-meter-long and 400-500-meter-wide gravel runway. It had as many as five or six hundred aircrew and ground crew members, and various types of military aircraft took off and landed frequently, mainly various types of piston-engine aircraft.

In 1946, China National Aviation Corporation began civil aviation operations in Xichang, opening the Xichang-Chongqing route. The airport was converted into a joint military-civilian airport, and later routes such as Xichang-Kunming, Xichang-Haikou, and Taiwan were opened.

In October 1950, the civil aviation portion of Xiaomiao Airport was named Xichang Xiaomiao Airport, and the Chengdu-Chongqing route was opened to handle passenger and cargo transportation services. Operations ceased at the end of the same year, and the Xichang Civil Aviation Station was abolished. In March 1958, the Chengdu Administration of Civil Aviation opened the Chengdu-Xichang route at the Xichang Civil Aviation Station, and the station was reinstated.

In February 1967, the State Planning Commission approved the Civil Aviation Administration of China's plan to construct Xichang Qingshan Airport (then named Guogailiang Airport) at Guogailiang (now Anning Town) in Xichang. Construction commenced in April of the same year. By the end of December 1974, the airport construction and communication equipment installation, which had lasted eight years, were essentially completed. The runway was 3,600 meters long and 50 meters wide, running due north-south. A parallel taxiway was 3,600 meters long and 18 meters wide. Six connecting taxiways connected to the runway, along with four aprons and one passenger apron.

On May 1, 1975, Xichang Xiaomiao Airport was closed and the airport was moved to the newly built Xichang Guogailiang Airport. In 1988, the Xichang Guogailiang Airport expansion and renovation project commenced and was completed in December 1989. On May 12, 1997, Xichang Guogailiang Airport was renamed Xichang Qingshan Airport.

After renovation and expansion in 2010, the airport is able to handle 1.1 million passengers and 4,950 tons of cargo annually. The runway is 3,600 meters long and 50 meters wide, with one parallel taxiway. The flight area is classified as 4D. There is a 10,000 square meter terminal building with 3 boarding bridges and 7 Category C aircraft stands. The old 2,000 square meter terminal building has been converted into a cargo terminal.

In 2019, Xichang Airport launched a renovation and expansion project costing 200 million yuan. The project included upgrading the airport taxiways, VIP lounges and navigation lighting facilities, as well as building six new Category C aircraft parking stands.

== Airlines and destinations ==
Airlines	Destinations
Air China	Beijing–Capital, Chengdu–Tianfu
China Eastern Airlines	Shanghai–Pudong
China Express Airlines	Chongqing, Mianyang, Yibin
Colorful Guizhou Airlines	Guiyang, Hefei, Ningbo, Zhengzhou
Qingdao Airlines	Beijing–Daxing, Xishuangbanna
Sichuan Airlines	Beijing–Capital, Changsha, Chengdu–Shuangliu, Guangzhou, Haikou, Luzhou, Nanjing, Ningbo, Shenzhen, Xi'an, Zhengzhou
Xizang Airlines	Chengdu-Shuangliu

== See also ==
- List of airports in the People's Republic of China
