= Air Central (China) =

Chinese cargo airline

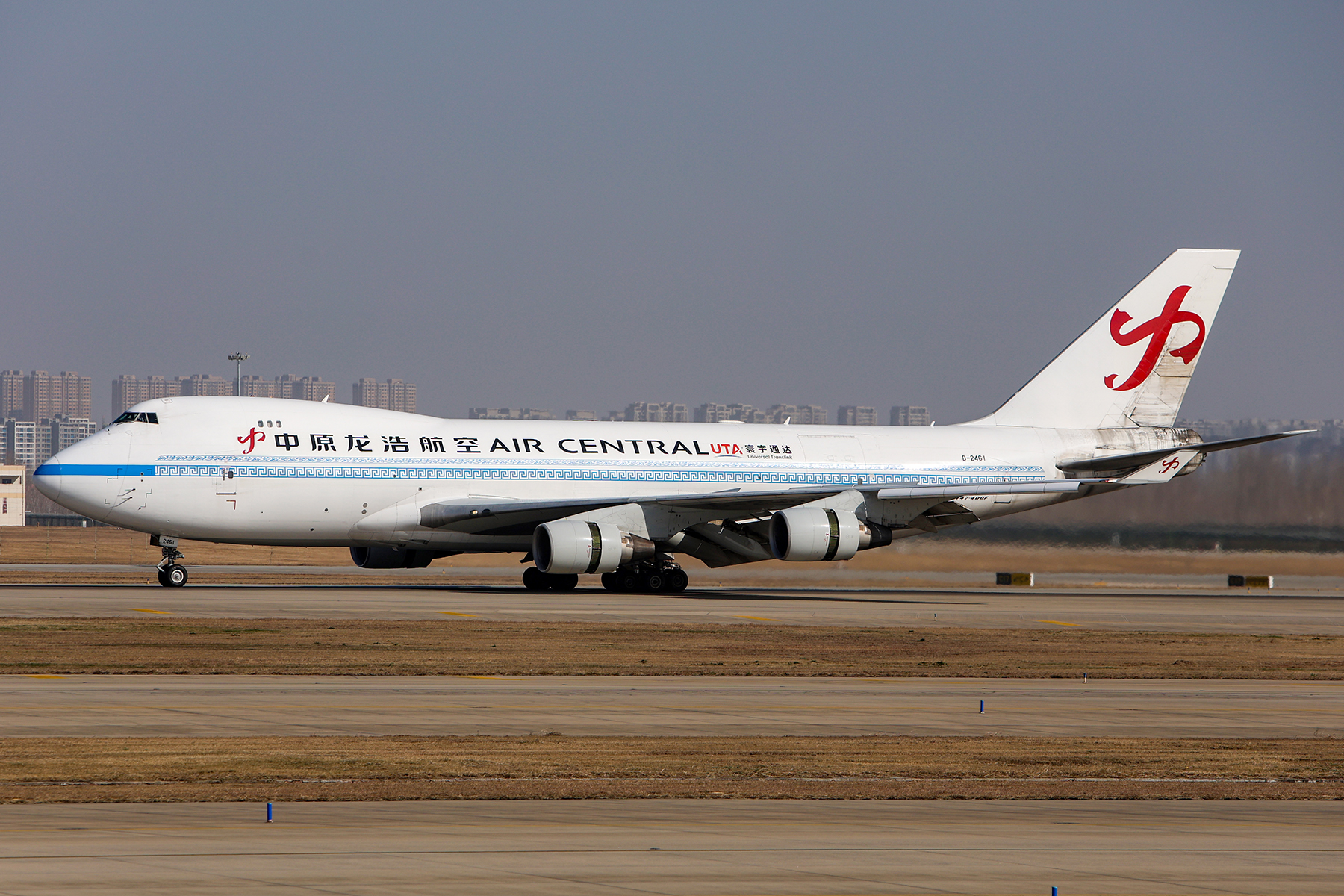
- Air Central Boeing 747-400F
IATA	ICAO	Call sign
GI	LHA	AIR CANTON
- Founded: August 2015; 11 years ago
- Hubs: Guangzhou; Zhengzhou
- Fleet size: 9
- Destinations: 10
- Parent company: Henan Civil Aviation Development & Investment Group
- Key people: Jiguang Zhao
- Website: www.airlonghao.com

Air Central (Chinese: 中原龙浩航空) — originally Guangdong Longhao Airlines (Chinese: 广东龙浩航空) and later China Central Longhao Airlines (Chinese: 中原龙浩航空) — is a cargo airline. It was founded in August 2015 with registered capital of 400 million yuan. It was acquired by Henan Civil Aviation Development & Investment Group in June 2019.

== History ==
In August 2015, Guangdong Longhao Aviation Co., Ltd., a wholly owned subsidiary, was registered with a registered capital of RMB400 million. Company to Guangzhou Baiyun International Airport as the main hub.

On June 8, 2016, CAAC formally approved the preparation for the establishment of Guangdong Longhao Aviation Co., Ltd.

In November 2016, the company obtained a business license.

In December 2016, the company's first Boeing 737-300F aircraft completed modification and successful flight test.

In February 2017, the company successfully passed the certification demonstration of on-site certification.

In March 2017, CCAR121 was awarded the Ministry of operation certificate.

On March 29, 2017, Longhao Airlines successfully achieved the maiden voyage between Guangzhou Baiyun International Airport and Nantong Xing Dong International Airport.

As of October 2017, 9 freight routes have been opened.

In June 2019, Henan Civil Aviation Development & Investment Group acquired Guangdong Longhao Airlines and changed its name to China Central Longhao Airlines.

The company was later renamed Air Central.

== Destinations ==
Hub
Future destination
Terminated destination
Charter

Destination	Country	Airport
Guangzhou	China	Guangzhou Baiyun International Airport
Hangzhou	China	Hangzhou Xiaoshan International Airport
Linyi	China	Linyi Airport
Nanjing	China	Nanjing Lukou International Airport
Nantong	China	Nantong Xingdong Airport
Quanzhou	China	Quanzhou Jinjiang Airport
Shenzhen	China	Shenzhen Bao'an International Airport
Suzhou/Wuxi	China	Sunan Shuofang International Airport
Xi'an	China	Xi'an Xianyang International Airport
Zhengzhou	China	Zhengzhou Xinzheng International Airport

== Fleet ==
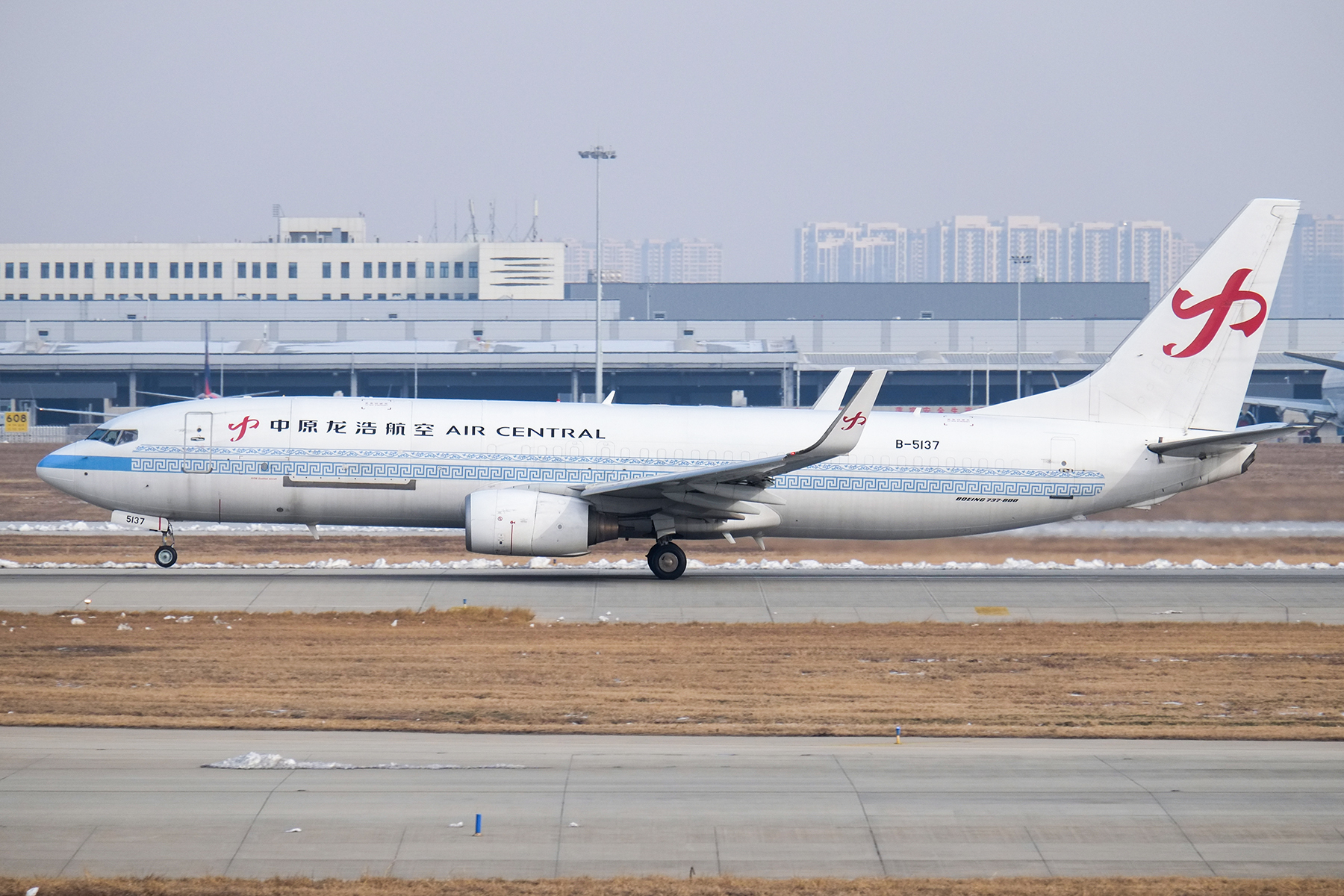
Air Central Boeing 737-800BCF

As of August 2025, Air Central operates the following aircraft:

Aircraft	In service	Orders	Notes
Boeing 737-800BCF	6	—	
Boeing 747-400F	2	—	
Comac C909CCF	1	49	
Total	9	49	

== Main business and future planning ==
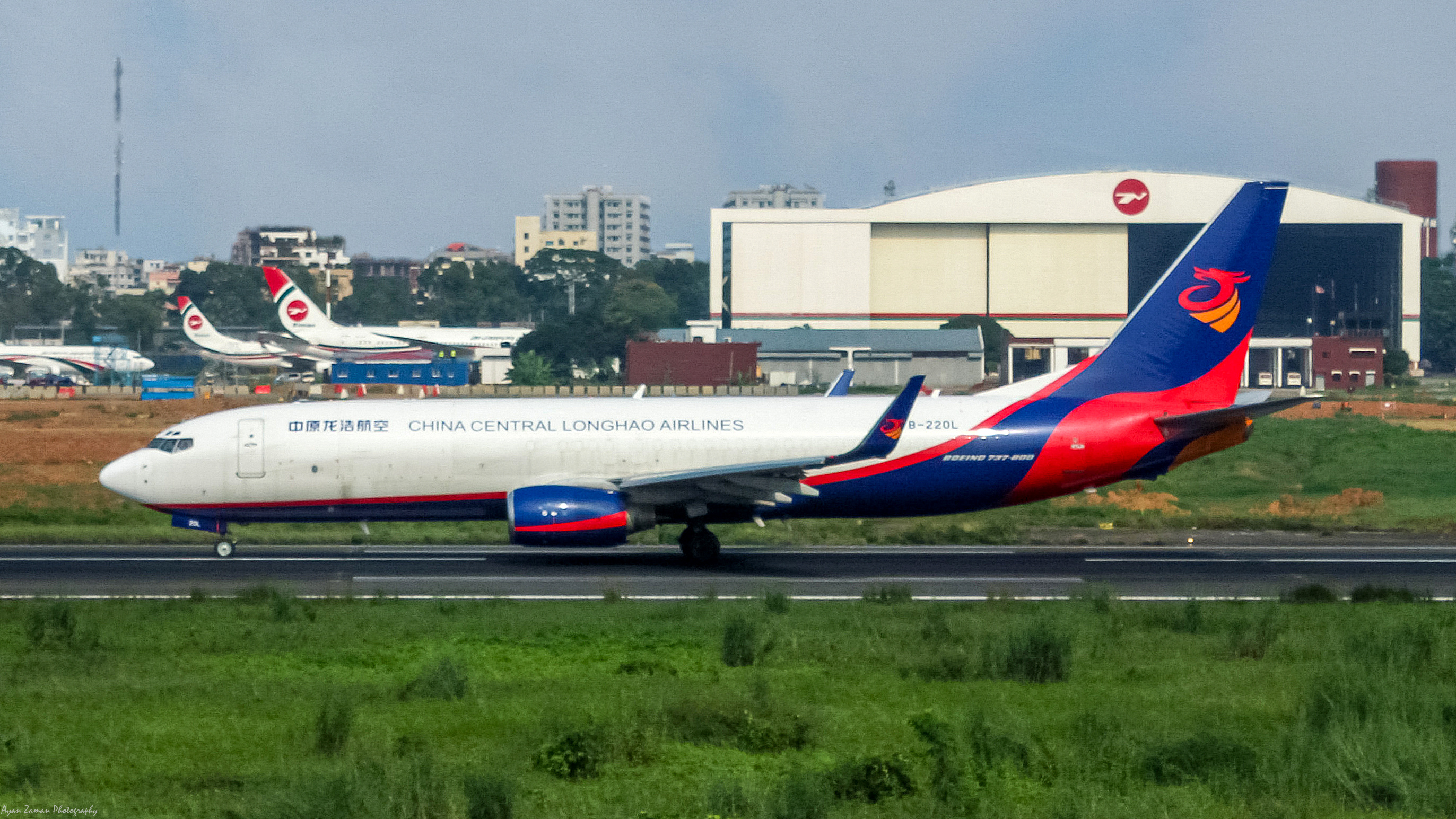
Boeing 737-800BCF in the former China Central Longhao Airlines livery

The company initially set up Boeing 737 series models of air passenger and cargo fleet, operating domestic and international air passenger and cargo operations, including international and domestic (including Hong Kong, Macao and Taiwan) air cargo shipping business, aircraft maintenance, aircraft supply, the airport waiting and management services, air transport goods packaging services, handling handling, road transport of goods agents, international freight forwarders and cargo inspection agency services.

Currently, Longhao Airways has purchased three Boeing 737-300F aircraft. In the future, the company will make full use of the advantageous resources of the Guangzhou International Hub Airport and gradually expand the fleet size. It was estimated that the number of aircraft fleet will increase by 5 each year and reach about 50 by 2020, and an air transport network system based in Guangzhou will be built and take 777 and A350 series aircraft as its carrying capacity increases to radiate Southeast Asia and even the world.
