= China Southern Airlines =

Chinese airline

China Southern Airlines 中国南方航空

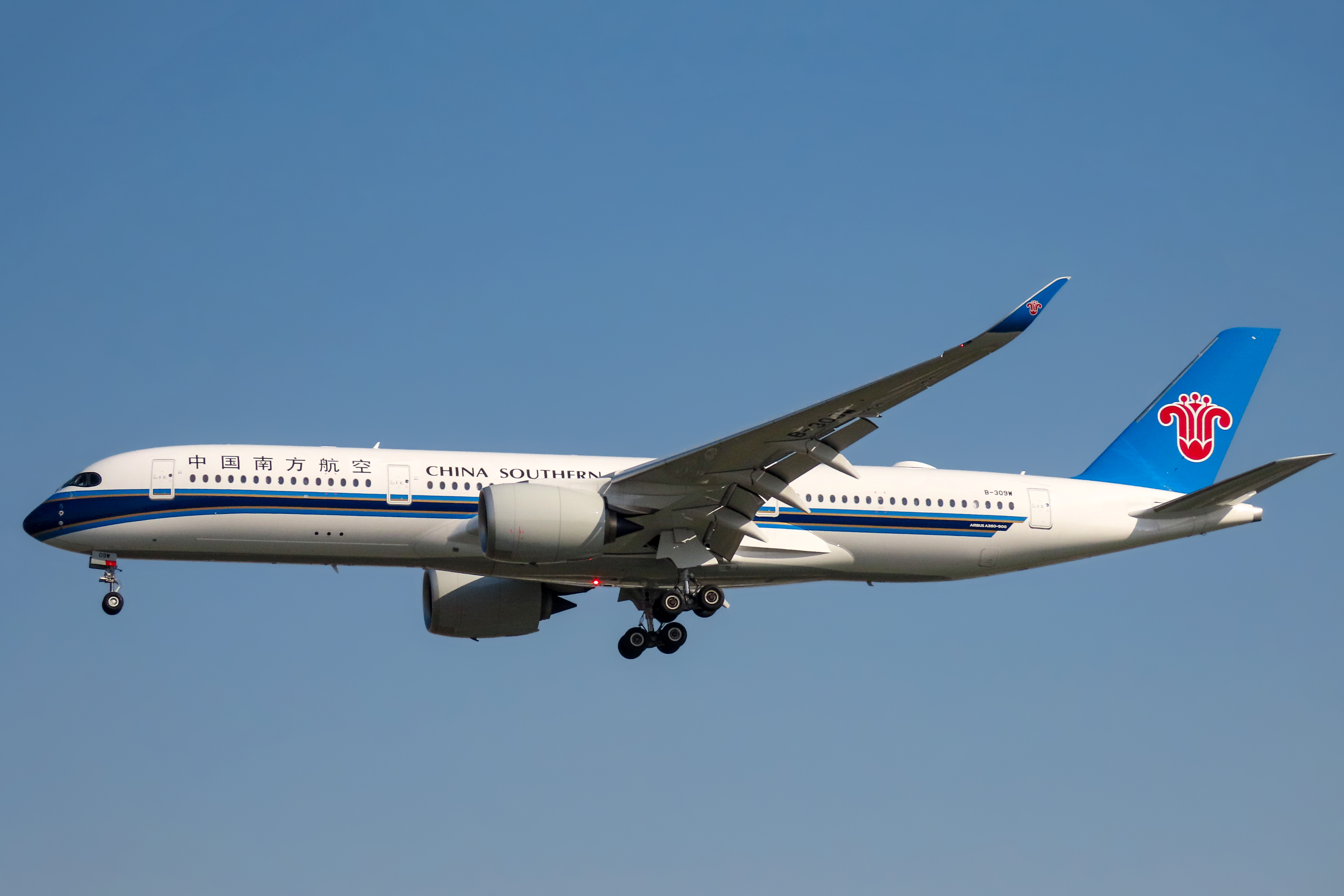
- China Southern Airlines Airbus A350-900
IATA	ICAO	Call sign
CZ	CSN; CSG (Note: Only for cargo flights.)	CHINA SOUTHERN (Note: Chinese airlines use Mandarin Chinese callsigns when in Chinese airspace. China Southern's Mandarin callsign is 南方; pinyin: nánfāng, lit. "southern".); SOUTHERN CARGO
- Founded: 1 July 1988; 38 years ago
- Commenced operations: 1 February 1991; 35 years ago (as China Southern Airlines)
- Hubs: Beijing–Daxing; Guangzhou; Shenzhen
- Secondary hubs: Chongqing; Shanghai–Pudong; Ürümqi; Wuhan; Zhengzhou
- Focus cities: Bangkok–Suvarnabhumi; Changchun; Changsha; Chengdu–Tianfu; Dalian; Guiyang; Haikou; Hangzhou; Harbin; Jieyang; Kunming; Nanning; Sanya; Seoul–Incheon; Shenyang; Xi'an; Zhuhai
- Frequent-flyer program: Sky Pearl Club
- Subsidiaries: Chongqing Airlines (60%); GAMECO; Sichuan Airlines (39%); XiamenAir (55%); Xiongan Airlines
- Fleet size: 708 (Note: 977 (group fleet as of August 2026))
- Destinations: 233
- Parent company: China Southern Air Holding
- Traded as: SSE: 600029 (A share); SEHK: 1055 (H share)
- Headquarters: Baiyun District, Guangzhou, Guangdong
- Key people: Han Wensheng (president); Ma Xulun (chairman)
- Revenue: ▲CN¥174.224 billion (2024)
- Operating income: ▲CN¥8.327 billion (2024)
- Net income: ▲CN¥0.025 billion (2024)
- Total assets: ▲CN¥191.577 billion (2024)
- Total equity: ▲CN¥52.836 billion (2024)
- Employees: 102,597 (2024)
- Website: csair.com/en (in English); csair.com (in Chinese)

China Southern Airlines
- Simplified Chinese: 中国南方航空
- Traditional Chinese: 中國南方航空
Transcriptions
Standard Mandarin
- Hanyu Pinyin: Zhōngguó Nánfāng Hángkōng
Yue: Cantonese
- Jyutping: zung^{1}gwok^{3} naam^{4}fong^{1} hong^{4}hung^{1}

China Southern Airlines Company Limited
- Simplified Chinese: 中国南方航空股份公司
- Traditional Chinese: 中國南方航空股份公司
- Literal meaning: China Southern Airlines, Company Limited by Shares
Transcriptions
Standard Mandarin
- Hanyu Pinyin: Zhōngguó Nánfāng Hángkōng Gǔfèn gōngsī
Yue: Cantonese
- Jyutping: zung^{1}gwok^{3} naam^{4}fong^{1} hong^{4}hung^{1} gu^{2}fan^{6*2} jau^{5}haan^{6} gung^{1}si^{1}

Second alternative Chinese name
- Chinese: 南方航空
- Literal meaning: Southern Airlines
Transcriptions
Standard Mandarin
- Hanyu Pinyin: Nánfāng Hángkōng
Yue: Cantonese
- Jyutping: naam^{4}fong^{1} hong^{4}hung^{1}

Third alternative Chinese name
- Chinese: 南航
Transcriptions
Standard Mandarin
- Hanyu Pinyin: Nánháng
Yue: Cantonese
- Jyutping: naam^{4} hong^{4}

China Southern Airlines (branded as China Southern) is a major airline in China, headquartered in Guangzhou, Guangdong. It is one of the three major airlines in the country, along with Air China and China Eastern Airlines.

Established on 1 July 1988 following the restructuring of CAAC that acquired and merged several domestic airlines. Since then, the airline became the world's sixth-largest airline measured by passengers carried and Asia's largest airline in fleet size, revenue, and passengers carried. In 2024, it ranked as the world's ninth-largest airline by brand market value.

With its main hubs at Guangzhou Baiyun International Airport, Shenzhen Bao'an International Airport and Beijing Daxing International Airport, the airline operates more than 2,000 flights to more than 200 destinations daily and was a member of SkyTeam until 1 January 2019. The airline started a frequent flyer program partnership with American Airlines in March 2019. The logo of the airline consists of a kapok flower (which is also the city flower of Guangzhou) on a blue tail fin. The company slogan is Fly towards your dreams. The airline also operates cargo flights branded under the name China Southern Cargo.

The parent company of China Southern Airlines Company Limited is China Southern Air Holding Company, a state-owned enterprise that is supervised by the State-owned Assets Supervision and Administration Commission of the State Council.

== History and development ==
=== Founding ===
China Southern Airlines was established on 1 July 1988, as part of the Chinese government's initiative to decentralize the Civil Aviation Administration of China (CAAC), and liberalize the Chinese aviation market. This restructuring aimed to transform CAAC's regional divisions into independent commercial entities. China Southern emerged from the former Guangzhou Regional Administration of CAAC, marking its inception as a separate airline. However, the airline's first commercial operations under its own name and livery didn't launch until February 1991.

The airline completed its decentralization from CAAC when it gained independence on 10 October 1993. During the airline's early years, the carrier was the dominant domestic carrier. Together with the two major airlines of China – Air China and China Eastern – the airline handled half of the passenger traffic carried by all Chinese carriers. Owing to Air China's status as the country's flag carrier, the airline is entitled to extensive international service rights, with China Eastern and China Southern's international networks confined to mainly East Asia and within Asia, respectively. Like other Chinese carriers, China Southern was subjected to CAAC's exclusive right to grant route-specific operating licenses and domestic prices.

=== Expansion ===
To raise its operating standards and distance itself from mostly unprofitable second and third-tier domestic airlines, the carrier signed agreements with several foreign carriers regarding staff training and aircraft maintenance, with the ultimate aim of being listed on the New York Stock Exchange, possibly as soon as early 1995.

Starting in the mid-1990s, China Southern sought to expand its international reach beyond Asia. In December 1995, the Chinese and United States governments signed an aviation agreement that would allow the commencement of non-stop air services between the two countries. After having been granted the right to establish services to Amsterdam in early 1996, the airline started Guangzhou–Beijing–Amsterdam, its first long-haul route, in November 1996. The following year, the carrier commenced non-stop trans-Pacific services to Los Angeles, as well as services to Brisbane.

The start of European and American services coincided with the arrival of the long-range Boeing 777s, the first of which was delivered in late December 1995, as well as a general expansion and upgrade of the carrier's fleet and the associated facilities. Due to engine certification and labor relations issues, the delivery of the first Boeing 777 was more than a month behind schedule. As a result, the carrier considered, but ultimately decided against, leasing the Boeing 747-400, which would have been used to cover anticipated delays as well as to launch trans-Pacific services to the United States. Nevertheless, the airline planned to double its fleet of 67 aircraft. In April 1996, the Chinese government placed an order, on China Southern's behalf, for 10 Airbus A320s; the delivery of the first aircraft, and China Southern's first Airbus, was made the following year. Guangzhou Aircraft Maintenance Engineering Company, which was jointly established with Lockheed Aircraft Services International and Hutchinson Whampoa, was carrying out expansion of its aircraft maintenance facilities in anticipation of the increase.

In July 1997, China Southern Airlines went public, listing on both the Hong Kong and New York Stock Exchanges. The airline raised $600–$700 million, which was mainly used to expand its fleet, pay off debt, and invest in other key areas. In 2003, China Southern Airlines listed domestically on the Shanghai Stock Exchange. By 1997, the airline, along with its joint-venture airlines Xiamen Airlines, Shantou Airlines and Guangxi Airlines, was carrying some 15 million passengers per year using about 90 aircraft, operating about 270 routes among 68 destinations and almost 2,450 flights per week. The airline group's revenue totaled some US$1.4 billion with a net income of $90 million.

=== Mergers and acquisitions ===
The end of the 1990s was a period of consolidation for the Chinese airline industry. Initially, China Southern looked to acquire several smaller non-profitable domestic carriers as it sought to highlight its expansion plans intoaise funds; among the deals was the purchase of 60% shares of Guizhou Airlines. Due to the weakening economy amidst the 1997 Asian financial crisis and intense competition among the some 30 Chinese carriers, in 1998, CAAC considered a comprehensive restructuring of the industry that would see the consolidation of the airlines into three or five carrier groups. At one stage, it was reported that CAAC was contemplating a forced merger of Air China and China Southern. Given the latter's dual listing in Hong Kong and New York, it was thought that such a merger would have eased Air China's path towardits own share offering. China Southern confirmed that such talks between them were occurring, although they ultimately proved fruitless. Had the merger proceeded, their combined fleets would have numbered some 250 aircraft, which would have made the resultant airline the largest in Asia.

Although there was considerable resistance to CAAC's call to rationalise the industry, in July 2000, the administrative body announced that the 10 airlines under its direct management will be merged into three airline groups, revolving around Air China, China Eastern Airlines, and China Southern itself. Within a month, China Southern had started absorbing Zhengzhou-based Zhongyuan Airlines, which at the time operated five Boeing 737s and two Xian Y-7 turboprops. The carrier would later merge with Shenyang-based China Northern Airlines and Urumqi-based Xinjiang Airlines to form China Southern Air Holding Co., a process that took more than two years and would culminate in China Southern's acquisition of their US$2 billion's worth of assets (as well as $1.8 billion of debt) in November 2004. Consequently, China Southern's fleet expanded from some 140 aircraft to over 210. The takeovers meant that the carrier became the main airline in Shenyang and Ürümqi, with passenger numbersjumping from 28.2 million in 2004 to 44.1 million in 2005. As a result, China Southern Airlines became one of the "Big Three" carriers in the country. Since then, it has successively taken over shareholding stocks and joined the equity in numerous Chinese carriers. The airline is the major shareholder of Xiamen Airlines (55%) and Chongqing Airlines (60%); it also invests in Sichuan Airlines (39%).

Amidst the major consolidation of the airline industry, China Southern in April 2000 started dedicated cargo services from Shenzhen using a Boeing 747-200F (which was quickly upgraded to the Boeing 747-400F) wet-leased from Atlas Air. To capitalize on the economic growth of the Pearl River Delta region (which includes Hong Kong), the carrier constructed a dedicated cargo center in Shenzhen. Successful operations prompted an order for two Boeing 747-400Fs the following year. The airline by now had commenced operations to Sydney and Melbourne.

In September 2003, China Southern signed a purchase agreement for four Airbus A330-200s to be delivered in 2005. This was part of the order placed in April by the China Aviation Supplies Imp. & Exp. Group covering 30 aircraft. China Southern became the first mainland Chinese A330 operator with the delivery of the first example in February 2005. China Southern followed up in September 2005 with a further order for eight A330-300s and two A330-200s.

The month of January 2005 proved to be significant for civil aviation in China in general and China Southern in particular. In preparation for the 2008 Summer Olympics in Beijing, China Southern, and the Chinese government placed several landmark widebody-aircraft orders from Airbus and Boeing. More specifically, on 28 January 2005, the carrier became the first (and so far the only) Chinese carrier to commit to the Airbus A380 double-deck aircraft, when it signed a general-terms agreement for five examples worth US$1.4 billion at catalog prices. On the same day, China Southern, along with five other domestic carriers, placed a bulk order for 60 Boeing 7E7s (later renamed the Boeing 787 Dreamliner). The aircraft was worth $7.2 billion at list prices, and the first example was expected to be delivered in time for the Olympics; however, the first aircraft did not arrive until June 2013.

Earlier during the month, the CAAC had approved the temporary operations of charter flights between mainland China and Taiwan. On the same day as the widebody orders, a China Southern Airlines Boeing 777–200 took off from Guangzhou and landed in Taipei the following day, becoming the first mainland Chinese aircraft to land in the Republic of China since 1949, when the Kuomintang were involved in Chinese Civil War with the Chinese Communist Party. The flight carried 242 passengers home after the Chinese New Year. Previously, passengers traveling between the mainland and Taiwan had to transit through a third port such as Hong Kong or Macau. Within three years, in July 2008, a China Southern Airlines Airbus A330 carrying 230 tourists again landed in Taipei. The governments of China and Taiwan had both agreed to allow direct flights across the Taiwan Strait in June, ending six decades of limited air travel between the two sides. Following the flight, China Southern Airlines Chairman and pilot of the flight, Liu Shaoyong, said, "From today onward, regular commercial flights will replace the rumbling warplanes over the skies of the Taiwan Strait, and relations between the two sides will become better and better."

Following two years of negotiations which had started in August 2004, in late June 2006, China Southern signed an agreement with SkyTeam, one of the three global airline alliances, formally pledging itself to the improvement of standards with the aim of its eventual joining. According to the agreement, the airline committed to the upgrade of handling services, facilities, and training of at least 75% of its staff to SkyTeam's standards. On 15 November 2007, China Southern officially joined SkyTeam, becoming the eleventh carrier to join the grouping and the first mainland Chinese carrier to join an airline alliance. The welcoming ceremony was attended by high-ranking Chinese government and SkyTeam corporate officials and was held at the Great Hall of the People. The carrier's integration with the alliance continued with its entry into SkyTeam Cargo in November 2010, and its joint-venture carrier Xiamen Airlines' formal joining in November 2012. With China Eastern's ascension in June 2011, SkyTeam furthered its leading presence on the mainland Chinese market; the remaining Big Three carrier, Air China, is a member of Star Alliance.

It followed up with another Airbus order on 7 July 2006, when it confirmed a deal covering the purchase of 50 more A320 narrow bodies for delivery in 2009. The order included 13 A319-100s, 20 A320-200s and 17 A321-200s, reportedly worth $3.3 billion at list prices. In December 2005, China Southern Airlines along with CASGC, announced an order with Boeing for 9 Boeing 737-700s and 11 Boeing 737-800s.

In June 2006, China Southern Airlines confirmed another order of three Boeing 737-700s and seven Boeing 737-800s. The deliveries would continue through 2010. On 18 October 2006, China Southern Airlines placed an order for six Boeing 777 freighters, striding forward a brand new step in its cargo development. The aircraft would be delivered from November 2008 to July 2010.

On 20 August 2007, China Southern Airlines announced its intention for an order of 25 Boeing 737-700s and 30 Boeing 737-800s, which will be delivered from May 2011 to October 2013. It was a mere two months before, on 23 October 2007, China Southern Airlines announced that it had placed an order for 10 additional Airbus A330-200s. The order has a listed price of US$1.677 billion and the aircraft will be delivered from March 2010 to August 2012.

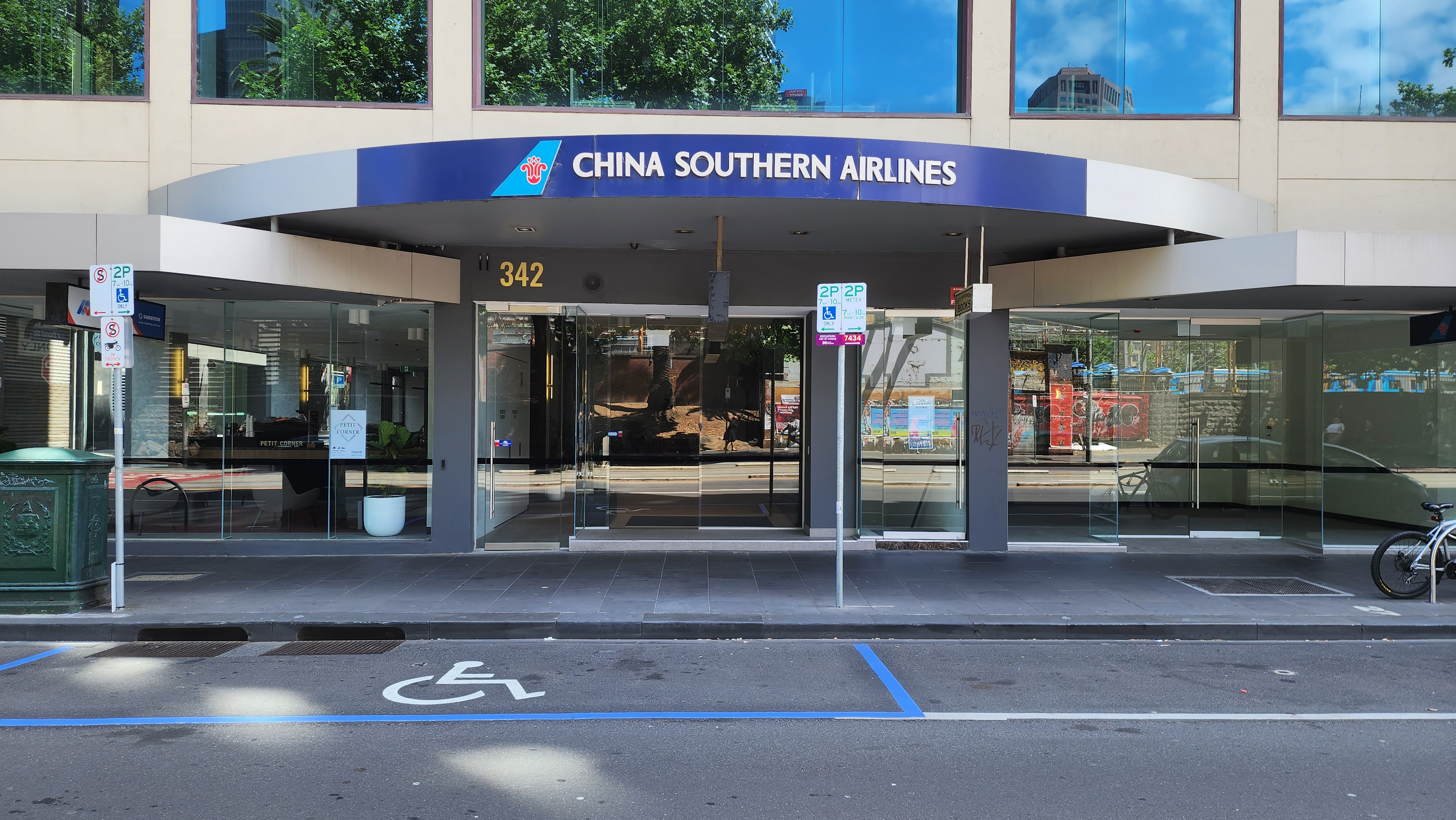
China Southern Airlines office in Melbourne

=== Recent developments ===
During 2009, China Southern Airlines remodeled its strategy from a point-to-point hub to a full hub and spoke carrier, which has been proven successful. Along with that, the airline has rapidly expanded its international market share, particularly in Australia, where passenger numbers in 2011 have been 97% greater than in 2010.

On 21 January 2010, China Southern Airlines announced an order for an additional 20 A320-200s, scheduled for delivery in 2011, due to the falling fuel costs and surging passenger demand. In March 2010, the Chinese carrier issued new shares in Hong Kong and Shanghai 2010 to raise 10.75 billion yuan ($1.57 billion) in a bid to pay off outstanding loans. In December, CNY810 million ($121.5 million) was injected by China Southern Airlines into its subsidiary Xiamen Airlines to fund its fleet expansion. In November 2010, China Southern Airlines signed an agreement with Airbus for the purchase of 6 A330s and 30 A320–200s.

On 11 January 2011, China Southern Airlines announced a lease for 10 Embraer E190 aircraft, set to be delivered from the second half of 2011. On 27 January 2011, China Southern Airlines was awarded a four-star ranking by Skytrax. It is the largest airline to hold this title. On 17 October 2011, China Southern Airlines made its first flight with the Airbus A380. Initially, the airline deployed the A380s on domestic routes, flying between Guangzhou, Beijing, Shanghai, and Hong Kong. At the same time, the carrier conducted negotiations to commence A380 international services. Due to the government-imposed limitation that confined an international route to a single airline, China Southern in August 2012 announced its intention to initiate Beijing-Paris services in cooperation with Air China, pending government approval. Two months later, the A380 was deployed on Guangzhou-Los Angeles services. Early A380 operations were unprofitable and the aircraft, underutilised; services to Sydney were thus launched in October 2013. By May 2013, talks with Air China on Beijing-Paris services had ceased.

While China Southern, like the other two of the big three Chinese carriers, Air China and China Eastern Airlines, had been expanding rapidly since 2000, much of their activities had been focused on the domestic market. With the increase in outflow of Chinese tourists, who in 2012, for example, spent $102 billion internationally, as well as the rapid construction and introduction of high-speed rail in China, the carrier shifted its outlook overseas to sustain growth. Owing to the location of its hub at Guangzhou, which hinders the airline from effectively serving the North American market, the airline concentrated its international expansion on Australasia. In June 2012, with the inauguration of services from Guangzhou to London-Heathrow, the airline started marketing its services connecting Europe and Australia as the "Canton Route", an alternative to the Kangaroo Route flown by carriers such as Qantas. It hoped to attract the predominantly business traffic that travel between Europe and Australia, and channel such sixth-freedom traffic as well as traffic from mainland China through its Guangzhou hub (thereby transforming the carrier's network from one that emphasises point-to-point to a hub-and-spoke system). The carrier by now had added cities such as Auckland, Istanbul, Perth, and Vancouver to its route map.

During May–June 2012, China Southern Airlines has recruited Dutch flight attendants to serve the First and Business class sections for flights from Guangzhou to Amsterdam.

On 7 June 2013, China Southern operated its first Boeing 787 on a route from Guangzhou to Beijing Capital, the first Chinese airline to introduce the 787-8. The 787s were going to be part of China Southern's fleet for only a dozen years: in November 2024, the airline announced its intention to sell all 10 aircraft of the type by 2026 due to challenges in recovering long-haul services following the COVID-19 pandemic.

In early 2015, it was announced that the airline would lease 24 Airbus A320neo aircraft from AerCap for delivery between 2016 and 2019.

On 15 November 2018, the airline announced that it would leave SkyTeam by 1 January 2019 and will strengthen its partnership with American Airlines and others. The announcement lead to speculation that it will join Oneworld alongside Hong Kong carrier Cathay Pacific. Various media outlets reported that while analysts predict that its Oneworld move could threaten Cathay Pacific's position in the alliance, other analysts state that China Southern joining Oneworld would benefit Cathay more due to different target markets.

In March 2019, the airline announced a frequent flyer partnership with American Airlines. Currently, the airline plans for more flexible tie-ups with other carriers, mostly with Oneworld members such as Qatar Airways while not joining the alliance 'for a few years' in order to fulfill its dream as 'world's largest airline'. On 26 September 2019, China Southern operates at Beijing Daxing International Airport alongside its former and current partners, and all of its flights to and from Beijing are transferred to Daxing on 25 October 2020.

China Southern operated its last commercial Airbus A380 flight on 5 November 2022, remaining the only Chinese airline ever to operate the A380. The aircraft were retired due to market challenges following the COVID-19 pandemic, the last two being flown to storage at Mojave Air and Space Port in December 2022. One former China Southern A380 was acquired by Global Airlines in 2024 with plans to launch flights between the United Kingdom and the United States using this aircraft in 2025.

In early January 2025, China Southern Airlines suspend its daily service between Beijing Daxing and Moscow Sheremetyevo from 20 January to 30 March 2025. No reason was given by the airline. However, experts commented it may be due to the on-going conflict between Russia and Ukraine.

== Corporate affairs ==
=== Business trends ===
The key trends for the China Southern Airlines Group are (as of the financial year ending 31 December):

	Revenue (RMB b)	Net profit (RMB b)	Number of employees	Number of passengers (m)	Passenger load factor (%)	Fleet size	References
2012	99.5	3.7	73,668	86.4	79.9	491	
2013	98.5	2.7	80,175	91.7	79.4	561	
2014	108	2.3	82,132	100	79.4	612	
2015	111	4.8	82,132	109	80.5	667	
2016	114	5.8	93,132	114	80.5	702	
2017	127	6.8	100,831	126	82.2	754	
2018	143	3.3	100,831	139	82.4	840	
2019	154	3.0	103,876	151	82.8	862	
2020	92.5	−11.8	100,431	96.8	71.4	867	
2021	101	−11.0	98,098	98.5	71.2	878	
2022	87	−33.7	97,899	62.6	66.3	894	
2023	160	−2.9	99,468	142	78.9	908	
2024	174	0.025	102,597	165	84.4	917	

=== Ownership structure ===
	Owner	Number of shares held	Percentage of shares held
1	China Southern Airlines Group Co., Ltd.	9404468936	51.9
2	Nanlong Holdings Limited	2612124036	14.41
3	Hong Kong Securities Clearing Company Limited (Agent)	1750815837	9.66
4	Hong Kong Securities Clearing Company Limited	654597606	3.61
5	China Securities Finance Corporation Limited	320484148	1.77
6	American Airlines	270606272	1.49
7	China Aviation Oil Holding Company Limited	261685354	1.44
8	Spring Airlines Co., Ltd.	140043961	0.77
9	China State-Owned Enterprise Structural Adjustment Fund Co., Ltd.	72077475	0.4
10	GF Ruiyi Leading Mixed Securities Investment Fund	70644579	0.39

=== Cooperation with American Airlines ===
American Airlines invested $200 million in China Southern Airlines in March 2017, laying a strong foundation for a long-term relationship between two of the world's largest airlines. After the investment, American Airlines holds a 2.7% equity stake in China Southern Airlines. American Airlines and China Southern are two of the world's largest airlines with complementary networks, offering customers unparalleled destinations in both the business and leisure traveler markets. The two airlines have signed codeshare and interline agreements to provide travelers with flights to more destinations in China, North and South America. The codeshare route partnership includes the ability to earn and redeem AAdvantage miles, check baggage through, and book tickets.

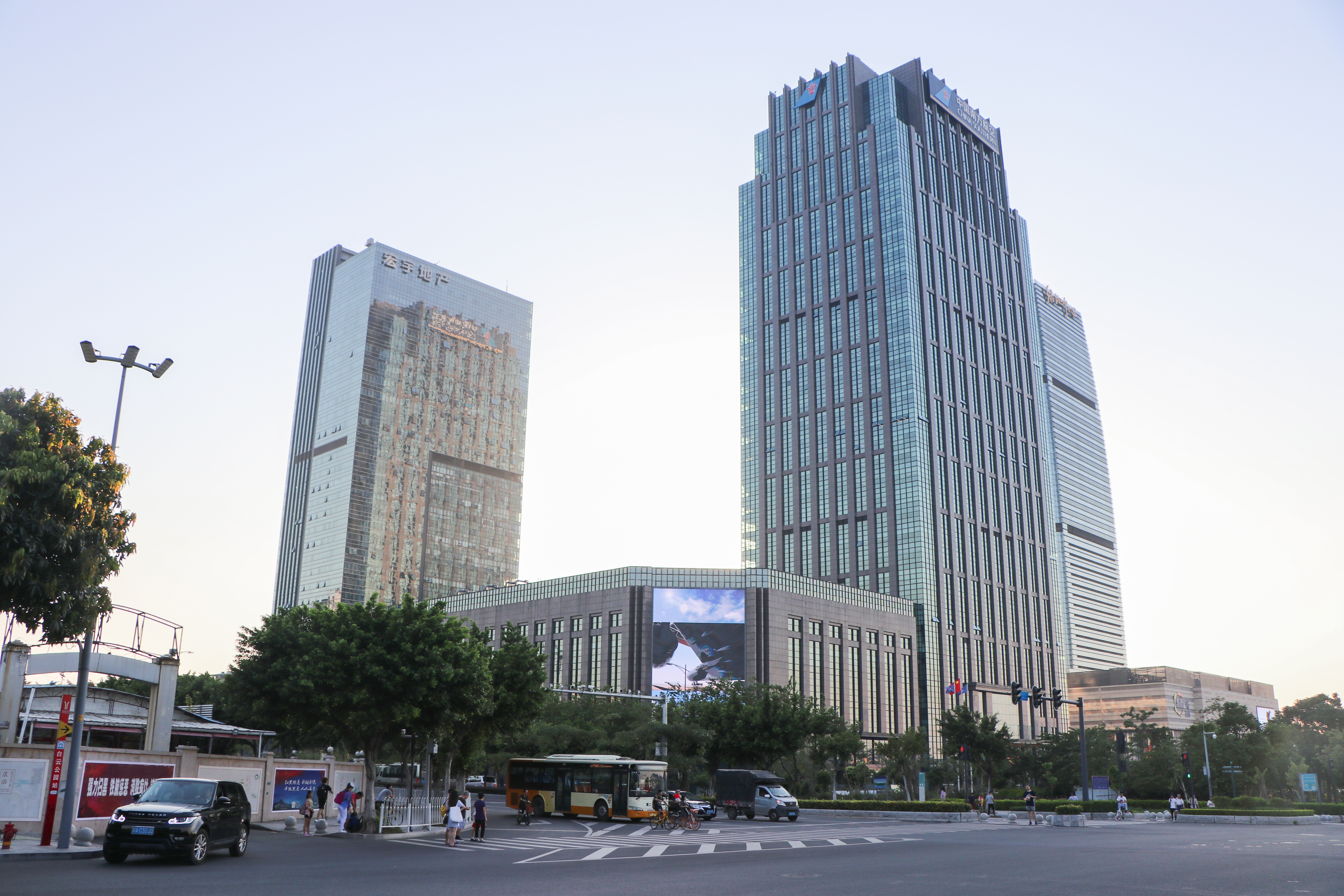
The China Southern Air Building, the company headquarters located in Guangzhou

=== Head office ===
China Southern is headquartered in the China Southern Air Building at 68 Qixin Road (齐心路) in Baiyun District, Guangzhou, Guangdong Province.

It was previously at 278 Jichang (Airport) Road (机场路) in Baiyun District.

China Southern had plans to open a new headquarters facility on a 988-acre (400 ha) site on the outskirts of Guangzhou, about 4 miles (6.4 km) from Guangzhou Baiyun International Airport. Woods Bagot won a competition for the architect firm which would design the facility. The proposed site consists of two parcels of land on opposite sides of a highway leading to Baiyun Airport; both sites are shaped like wings. The site will have a bridge and light rail system that operates above the highway to connect the two parcels, which will each have distinct functions. For instance, the east parcel will house internal functions such as the data center facilities, staff dormitories, and the training center. The airline wants it to be aesthetically pleasing from the air since it sits below a runway approach. The site will have a lot of outdoor space, which Woods Bagot designed along with Hargreaves Associates and Sherwood Design Engineers. Jean Weng, a Woods Bagot Beijing-based principal, said "Most Chinese cities are very dense and very urban, but China Southern wants to create a human-scale campus, that's close to nature." The new headquarters was opened in August 2016.

== Divisions ==
=== Cargo ===
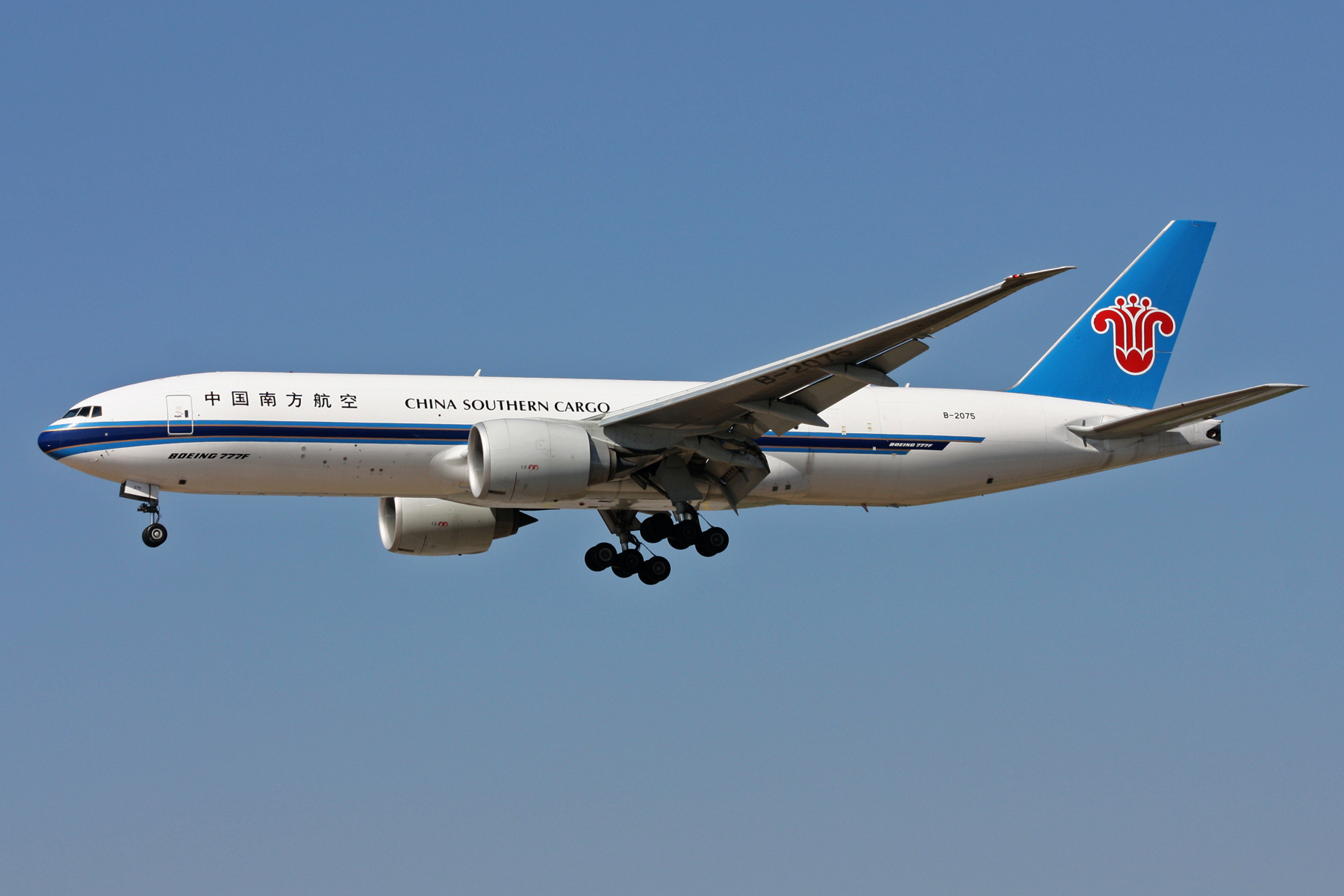
China Southern Cargo Boeing 777F, 2011

China Southern Cargo is the cargo subsidiary of China Southern Airlines. The cargo airline has hubs are in Shanghai and Guangzhou, and international destinations include: Amsterdam, the Netherlands; London Stansted Airport, the UK; Frankfurt, Germany; Los Angeles, Chicago, the U.S.; and Ho Chi Minh City and Hanoi, Vietnam.

The cargo subsidiary joined the SkyTeam Cargo alliance in November 2010 and withdrew on 1 January 2019 following the airline's withdrawal from SkyTeam.

=== General Aviation ===
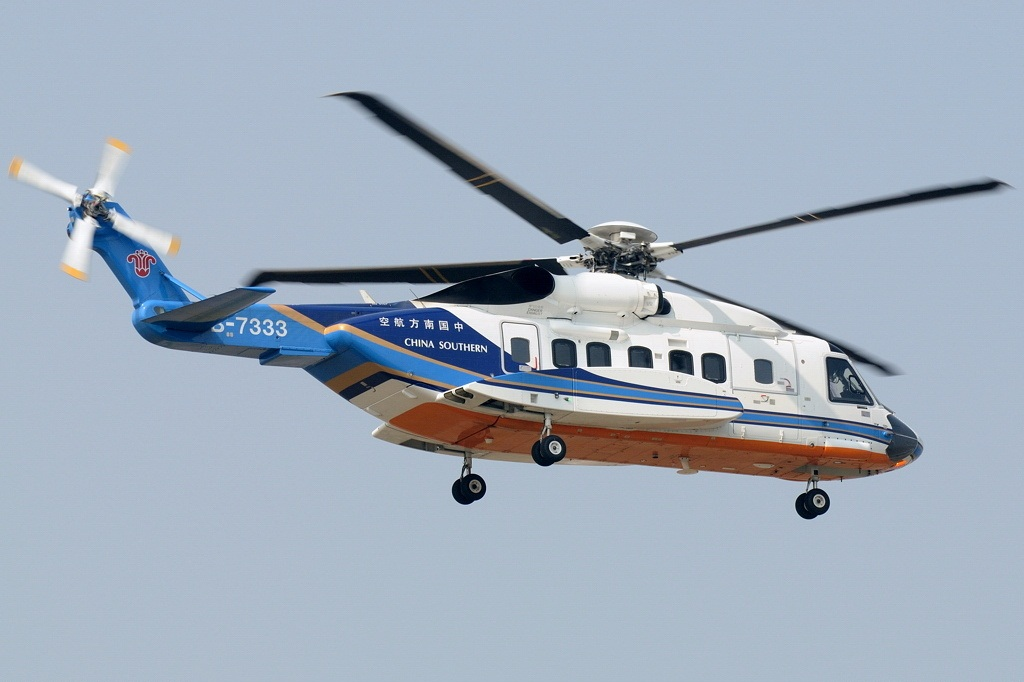
CSAGA Sikorsky S-92A in 2010

China Southern Airlines General Aviation (CSAGA) is the helicopter division of China Southern Airlines. Established in 1980 as Zhuhai Helicopter Company, the division was rebranded to China Southern Airlines General Aviation in 2003. The company currently operates out of 13 bases. Currently, it operates passenger, charter, rescue, aerial photography and other inspection flights.

== Destinations ==
=== Overview ===
China Southern Airlines line-up at its Guangzhou hub in 2013

China Southern Airlines serves 193 destinations in 35 countries worldwide. It maintains a strong presence in the domestic market with its main hubs at Beijing Daxing International Airport and Guangzhou Baiyun International Airport with secondary hubs at Shanghai Pudong International Airport, Chongqing Jiangbei International Airport, Ürümqi Diwopu International Airport, and Wuhan Tianhe International Airport, along with other focus cities in Changchun, Changsha, Dalian, Shenyang, Shenzhen, and Zhengzhou. The airline plans to continue to develop Chongqing and Ürümqi as hubs as well as to exploit the domestic market potential.

China Southern offers 485 flights a day from its Guangzhou hub and 221 from its Beijing hub. The airline provides services to 65 international destinations. Most of the international flights link Guangzhou with world cities. There are also plenty of international flights operated through Beijing, Shanghai, Ürümqi (notably to Central Asia and Middle-East) and Dalian (to Japan, South Korea, and Russia). China Southern Airlines has developed an extensive network in Southeast Asia and also has become the Chinese airline with the largest presence in Australia. China Southern is also considering expanding into the South American markets, as well as further expansion into the African market.

On 12 December 2024, it was reported that China Southern has resumed the direct routes between Guangzhou and Adelaide, South Australia. The route was initially launched in 2016, but ceased in 2020 due to the COVID-19 pandemic.

=== Alliance ===
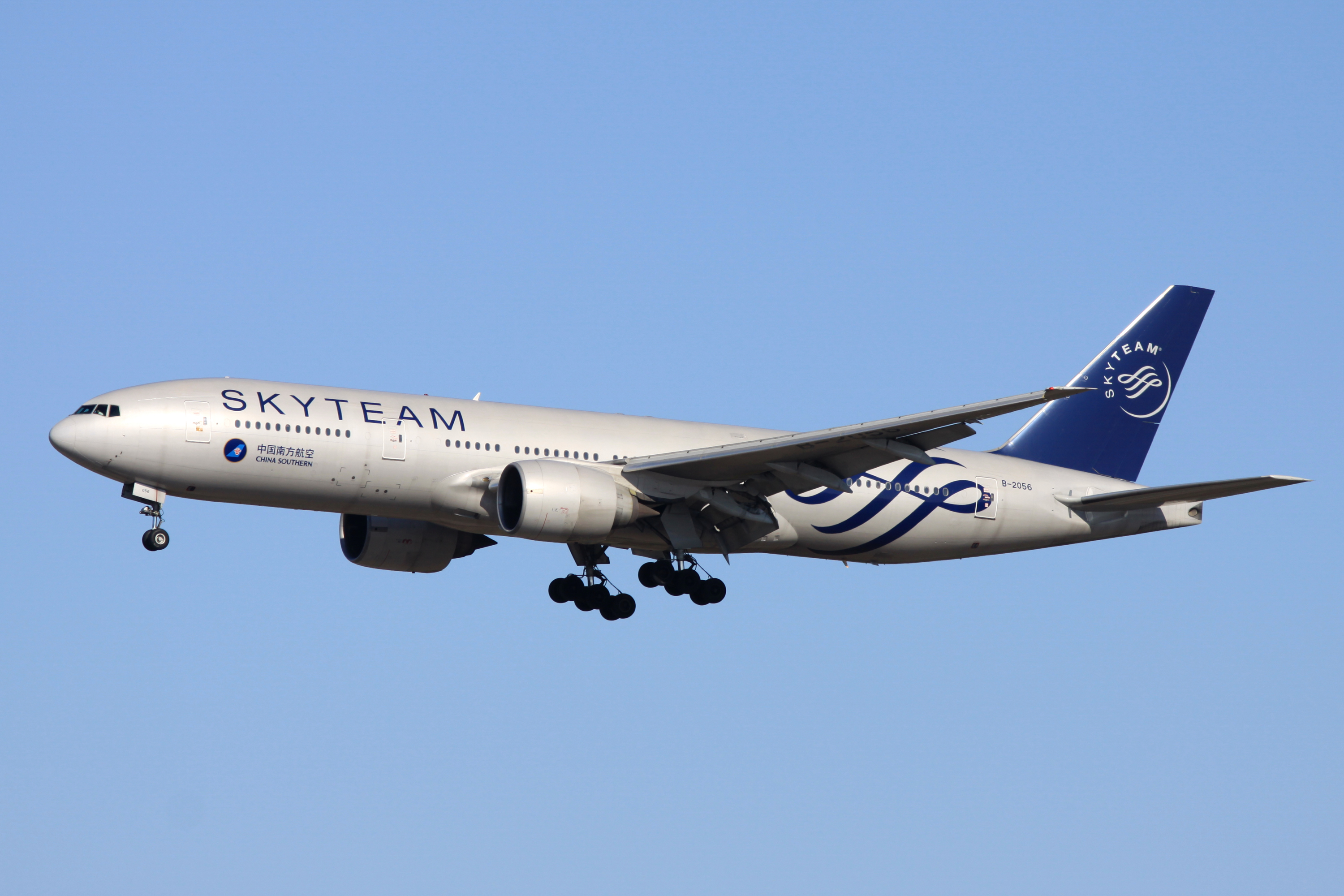
A China Southern Airlines Boeing 777-200ER wearing the SkyTeam livery in 2010

On 28 August 2004, China Southern Airlines signed a Memorandum of Understanding with the airline alliance SkyTeam. On 15 November 2007, the airline was officially welcomed as the 11th member of SkyTeam, becoming the first mainland Chinese airline to join any global airline alliance, expanding the alliance's presence on mainland China.

On 24 December 2018, China Southern Airlines released an official statement saying that it would discontinue its SkyTeam membership on 1 January 2019 and will also terminate its partnership with China Eastern Airlines and Delta Air Lines.

=== Codeshare agreements ===
China Southern Airlines codeshares with the following airlines:

- Aeroflot
- Aerolíneas Argentinas
- Air France (joint venture partner)
- Air Serbia
- American Airlines
- British Airways
- Chengdu Airlines
- China Airlines
- China Express Airlines
- Donghai Airlines
- Emirates
- Ethiopian Airlines
- Etihad Airways
- Finnair
- Garuda Indonesia
- Hebei Airlines
- Iberia
- Japan Airlines
- Kenya Airways
- KLM (joint venture partner)
- Korean Air
- LATAM Airlines
- Loong Air
- Malaysia Airlines
- Mandarin Airlines
- Pakistan International Airlines
- Qantas
- Qatar Airways
- Qingdao Airlines
- Saudia
- Sichuan Airlines
- Uzbekistan Airways
- Vietnam Airlines (joint venture partner)
- Virgin Australia
- WestJet
- XiamenAir (subsidiary)

=== Interline Agreements ===
- My Freighter Airlines

== Fleet ==
=== Current fleet ===
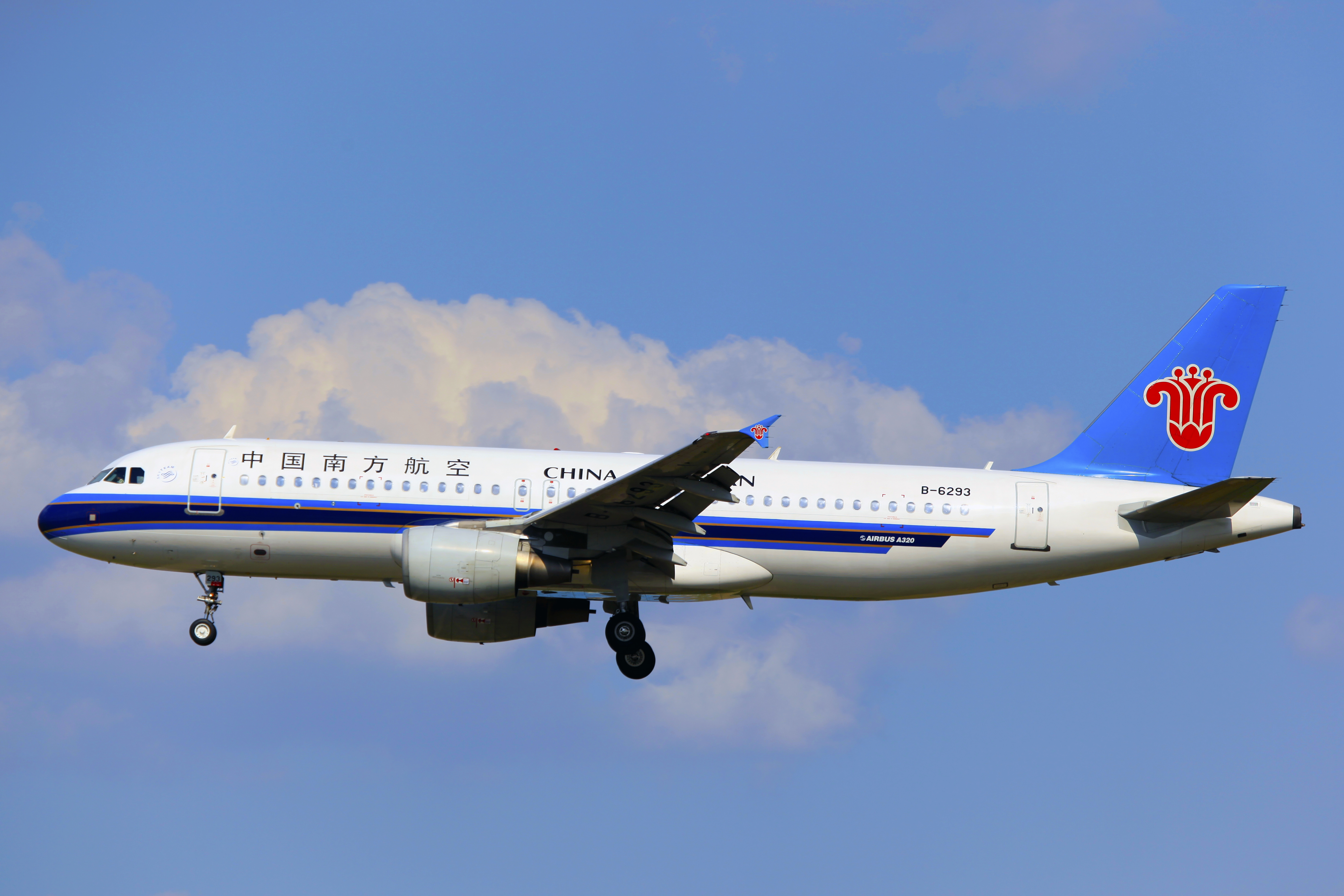
Airbus A320-200 in 2013

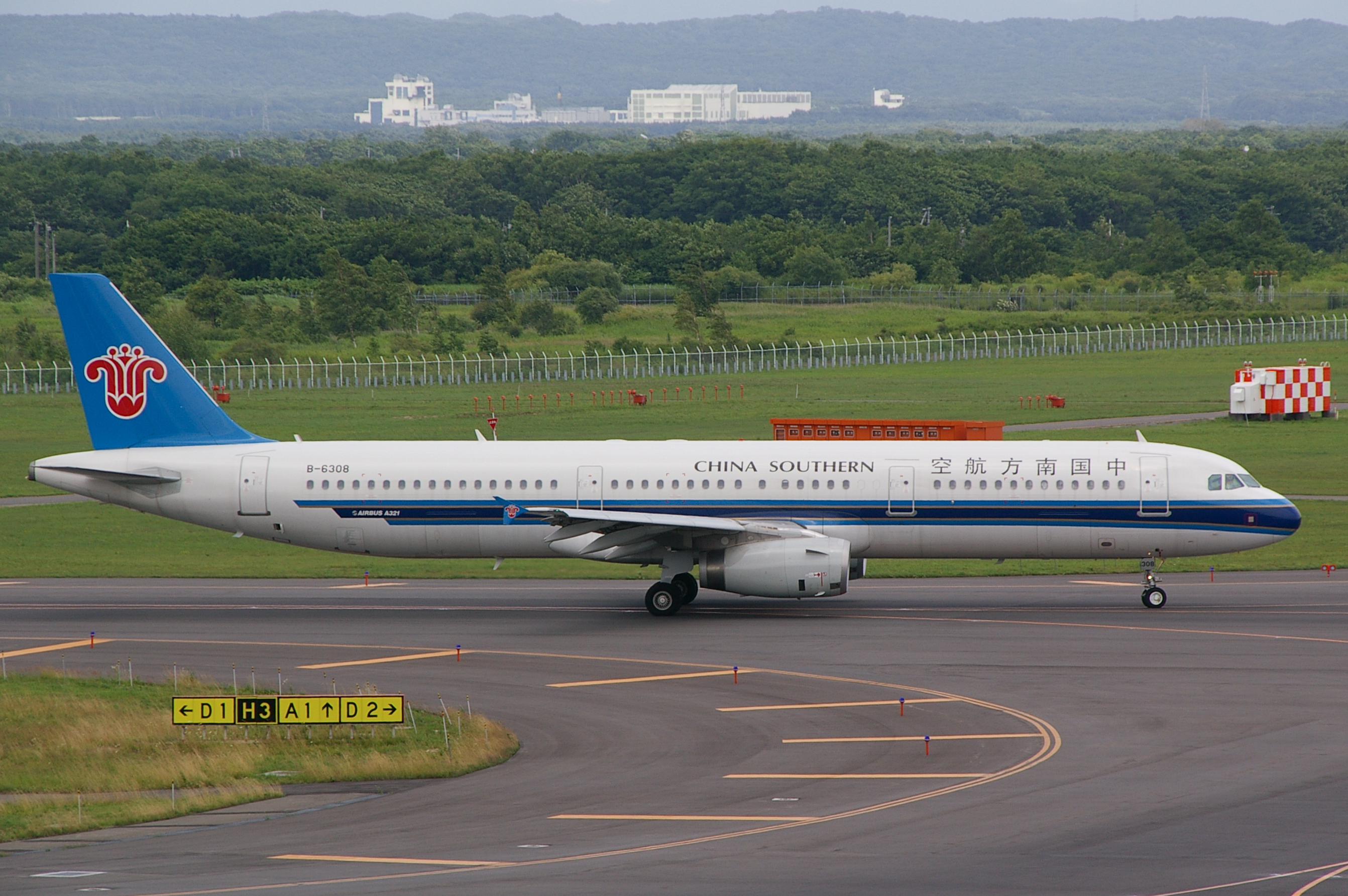
Airbus A321-200 in 2007

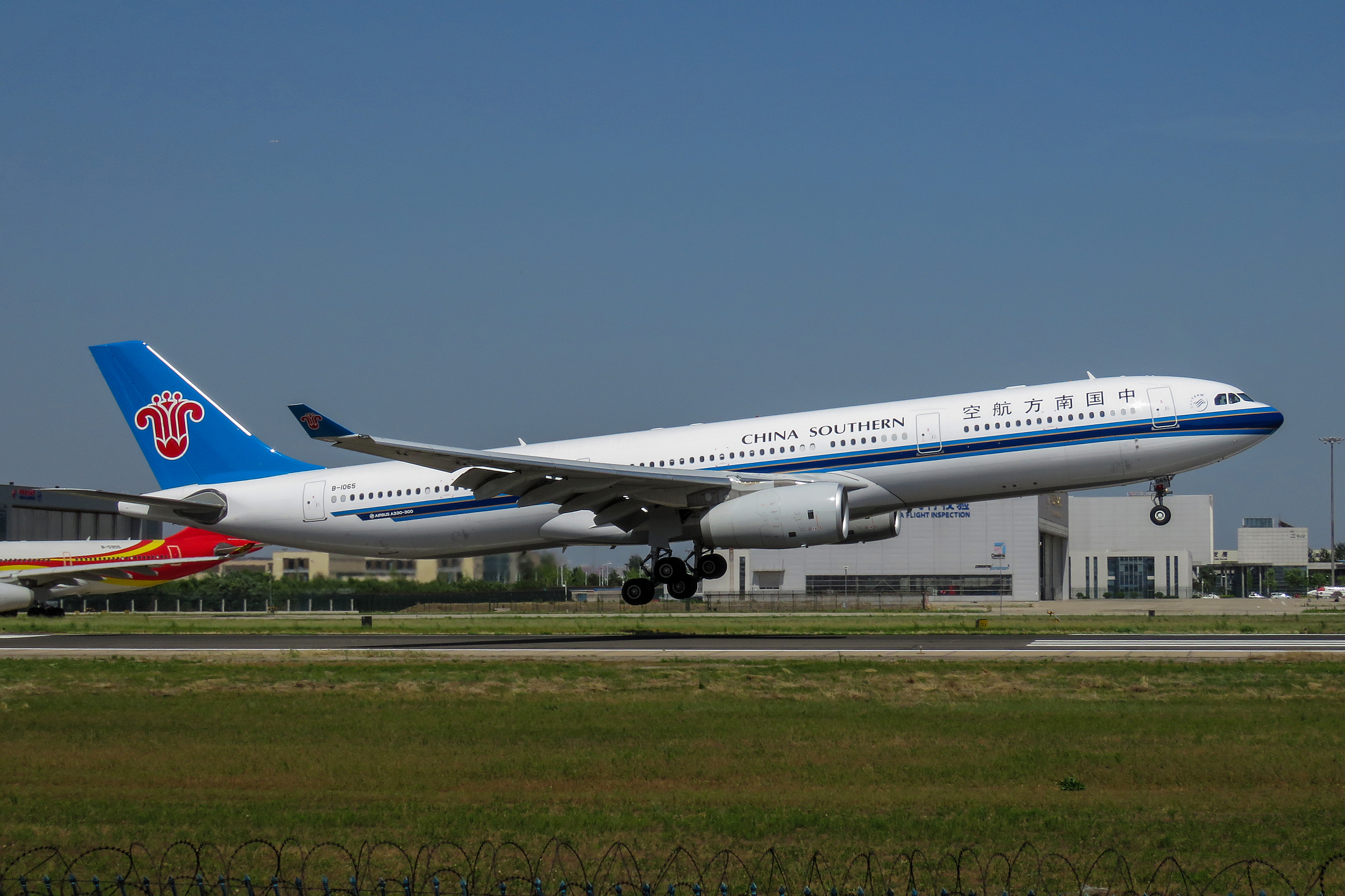
Airbus A330-300 in 2018

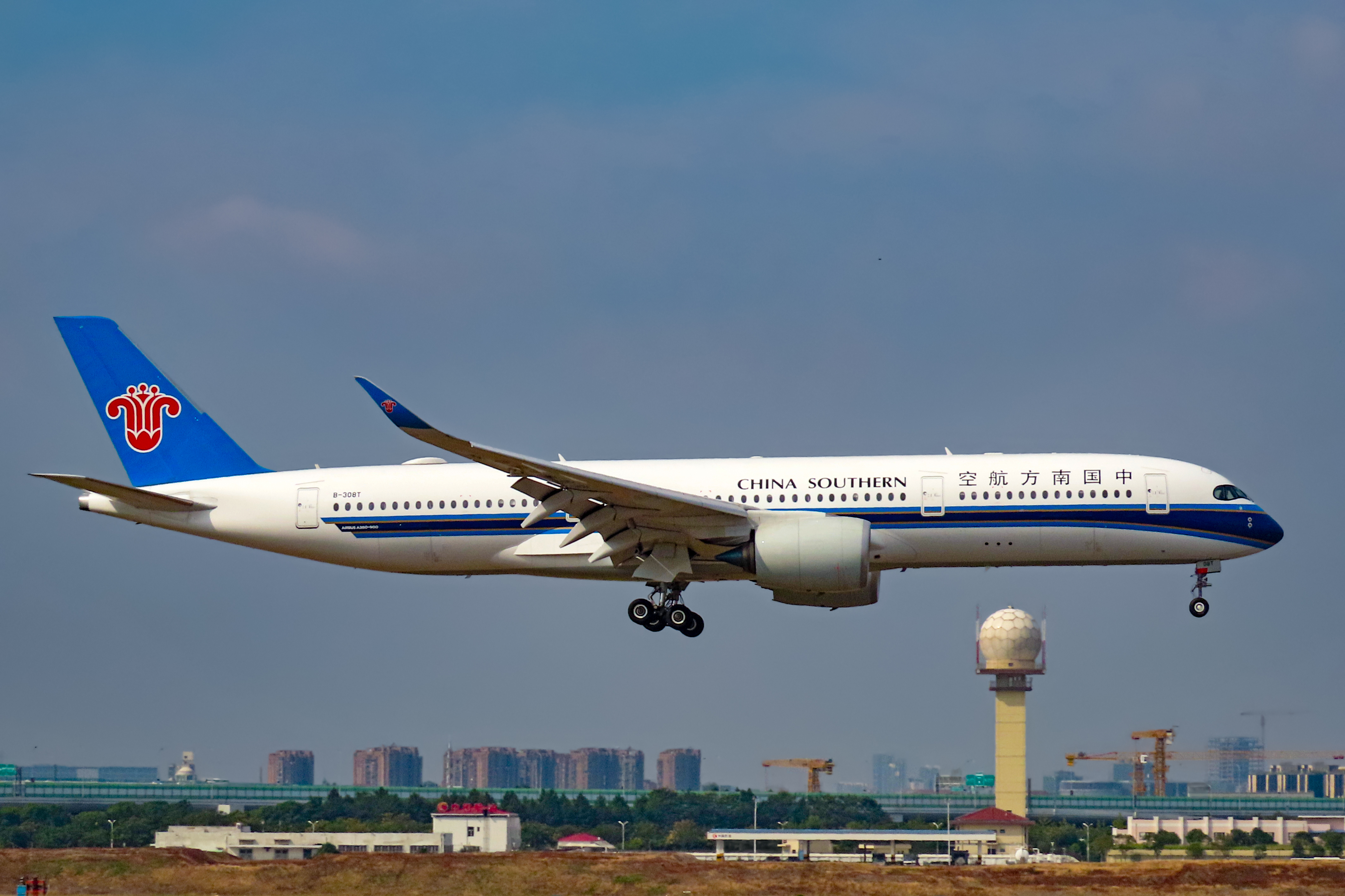
Airbus A350-900 in 2019

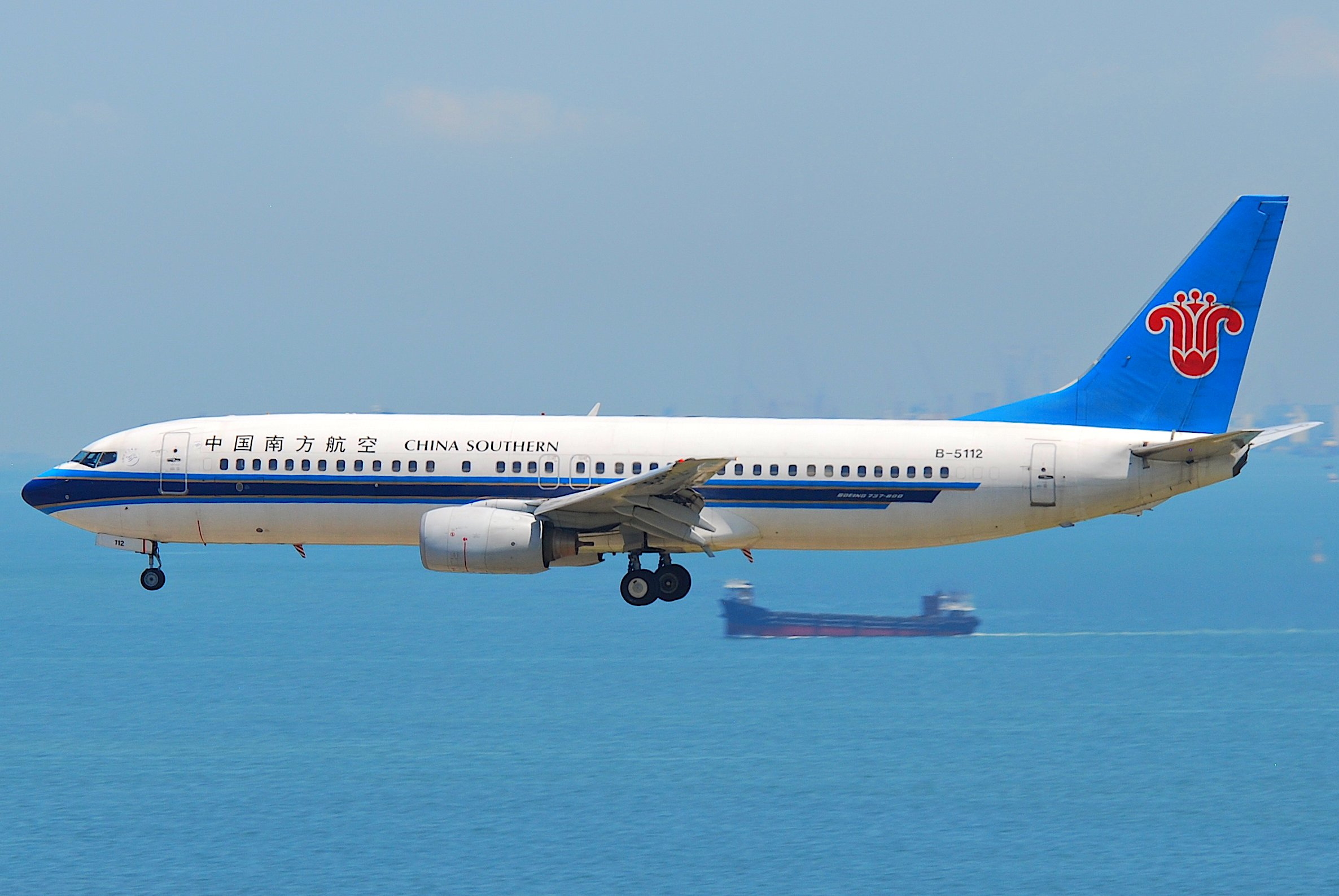
Boeing 737-800 in 2011

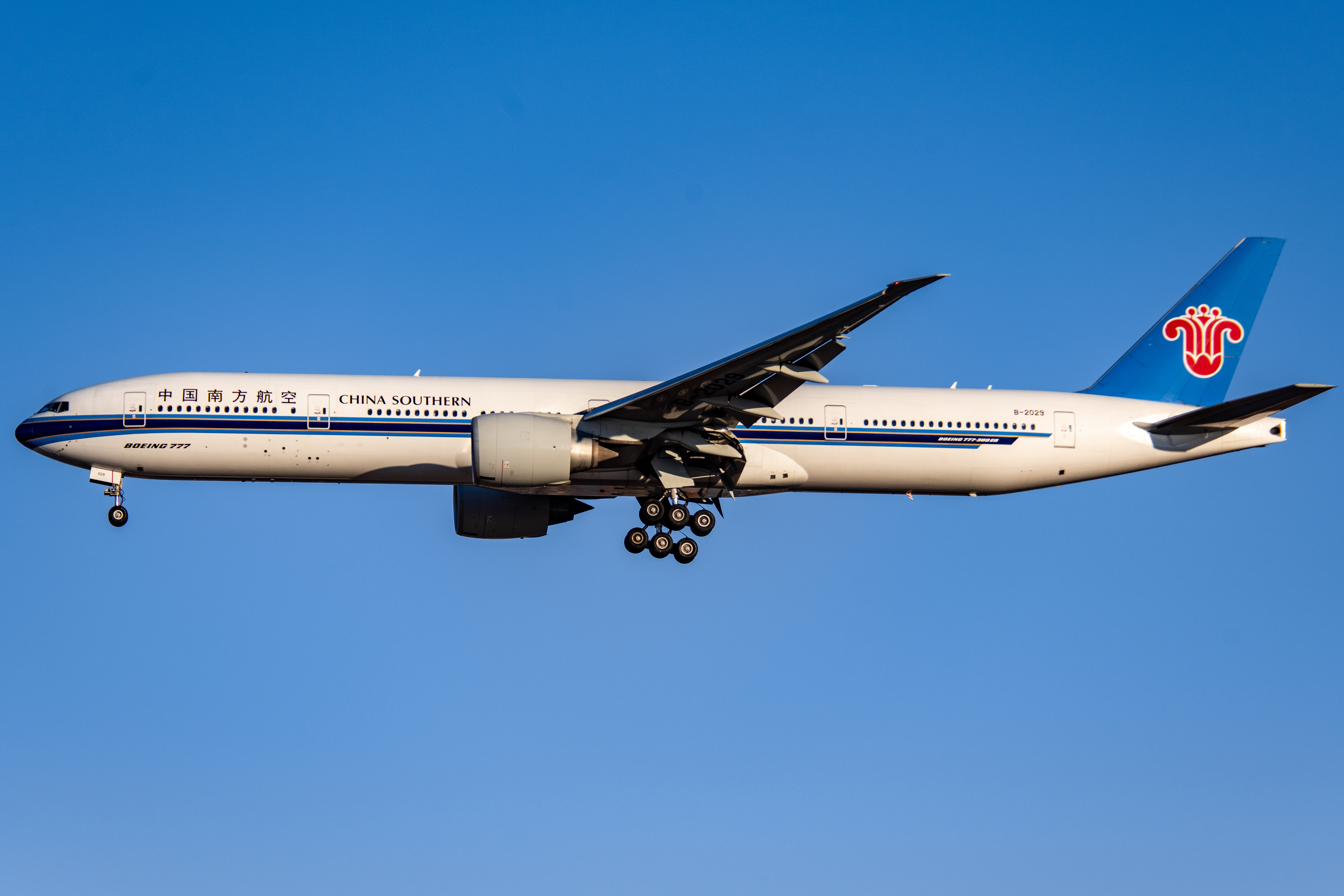
Boeing 777-300ER in 2019

Boeing 787-9 in 2019

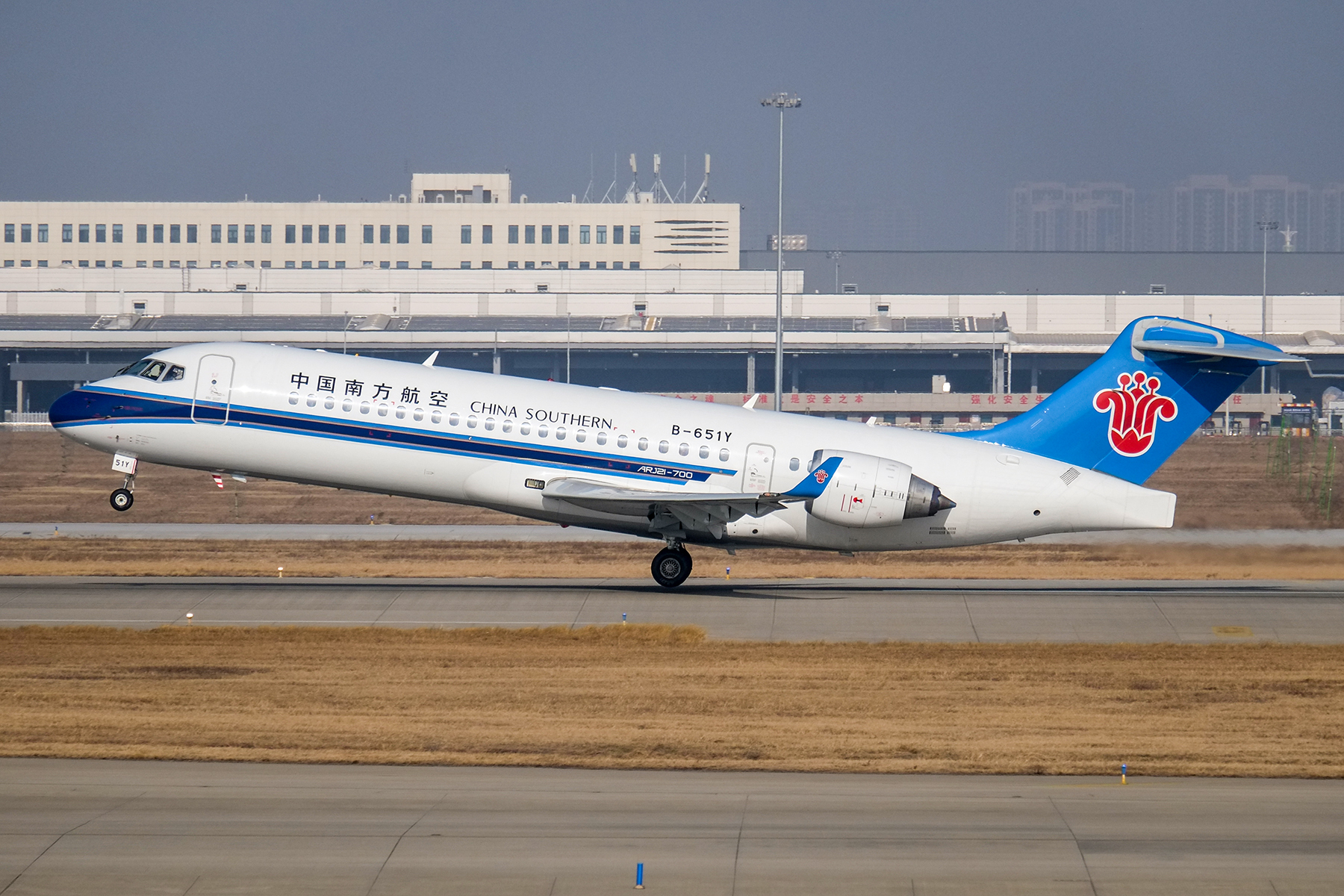
Comac C909 in 2023

As of July 2026, China Southern Airlines operates the following aircraft:

China Southern Airlines fleet
Aircraft	In service	Orders	Passengers				Notes
Aircraft	In service	Orders	J	W	Y	Total	Notes
Airbus A319neo	9	—	4	24	116	144	Launch customer.
Airbus A320-200	93	—	8	24	120	152	
Airbus A320-200	93	—	4	18	138	160	
Airbus A320-200	93	—	4	24	138	166	
Airbus A320neo	74	27	4	24	138	166	
Airbus A321-200	81	—	12	24	143	179	
Airbus A321-200	81	—	4	18	167	189	
Airbus A321-200	81	—	4	24	167	195	
Airbus A321neo	94	119	4	24	167	195	
Airbus A321neo	94	119	12	24	164	200	
Airbus A330-300	25	—	30	—	253	283	
Airbus A330-300	25	—	28	—	258	286	
Airbus A350-900	20	—	28	24	262	314	
Airbus A350-900	20	—	28	—	307	335	
Boeing 737-800	153	—	8	24	132	164	
Boeing 737-800	153	—	4	24	150	178	
Boeing 737-800	153	—	4	18	147	169	
Boeing 737-800	153	—	4	18	150	172	
Boeing 737 MAX 8	48	26	4	24	150	178	The airline with the largest Boeing 737 MAX 8 fleet currently operating in China.
Boeing 777-300ER	15	—	28	28	305	361	
Boeing 787-9	21	—	28	28	220	276	3 orders were transferred to XiamenAir.
Boeing 787-9	21	—	28	—	269	297	3 orders were transferred to XiamenAir.
Comac C909	35	—	—	—	90	90	
Comac C919-100STD	8	92	8	—	156	164	First aircraft delivered in August 2024.
China Southern Cargo fleet
Boeing 777F	19	2	Cargo				
Boeing 777-8F	—	5	Cargo				Order with 3 options.
Total	705	271					

=== Former fleet ===
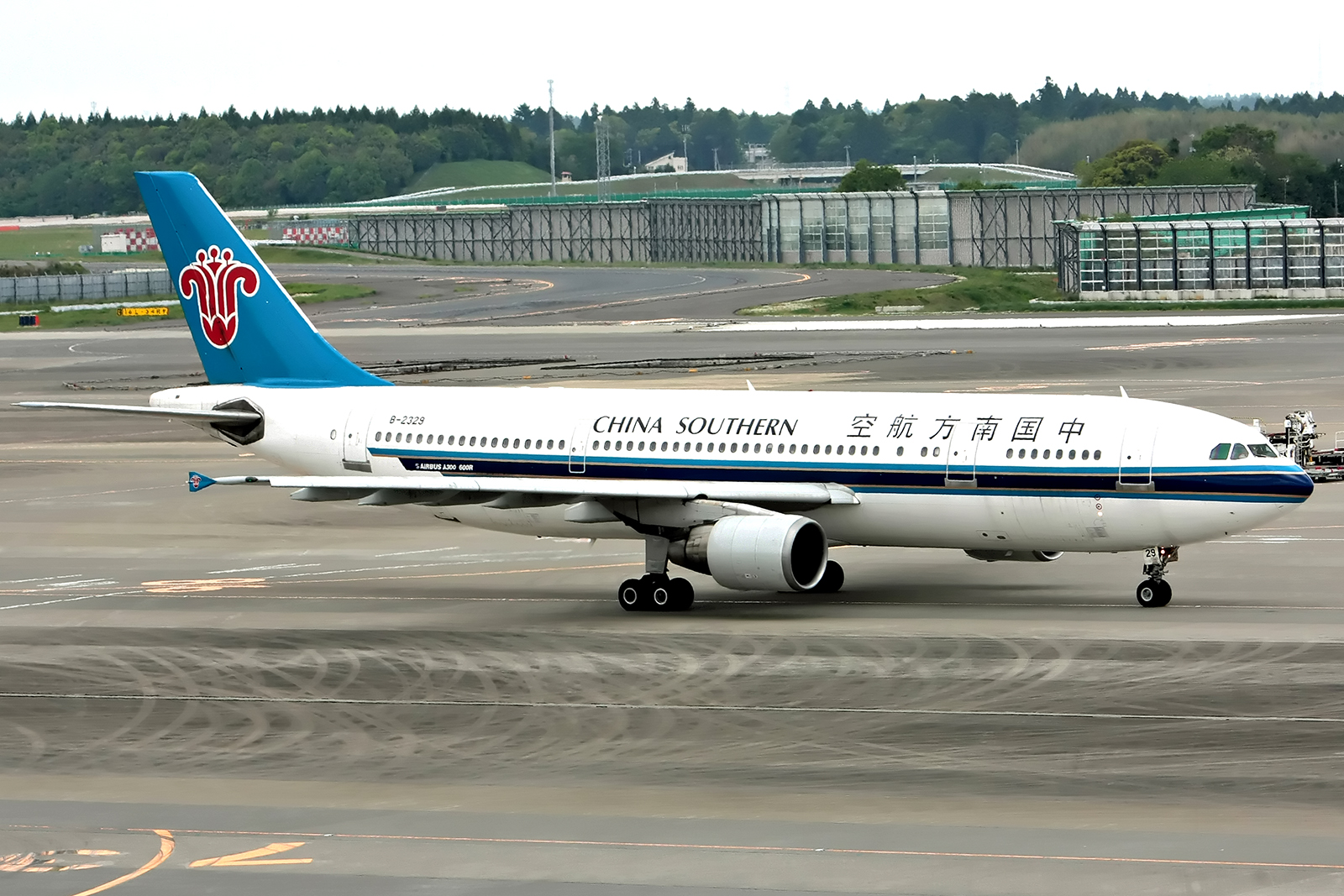
Airbus A300-600R in 2009

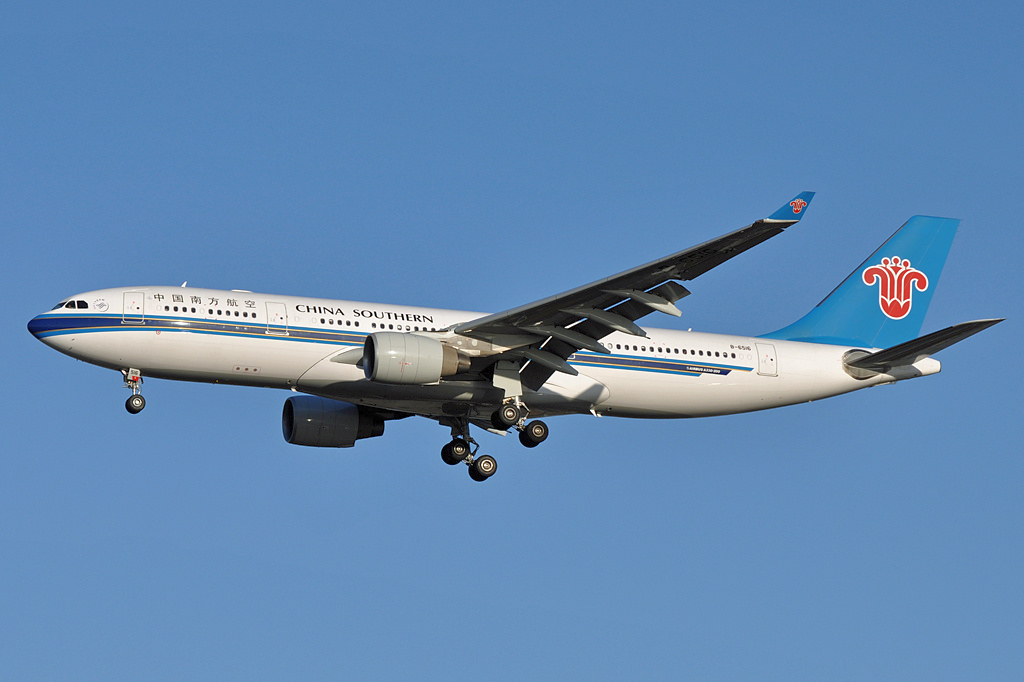
Airbus A330-200 in 2011

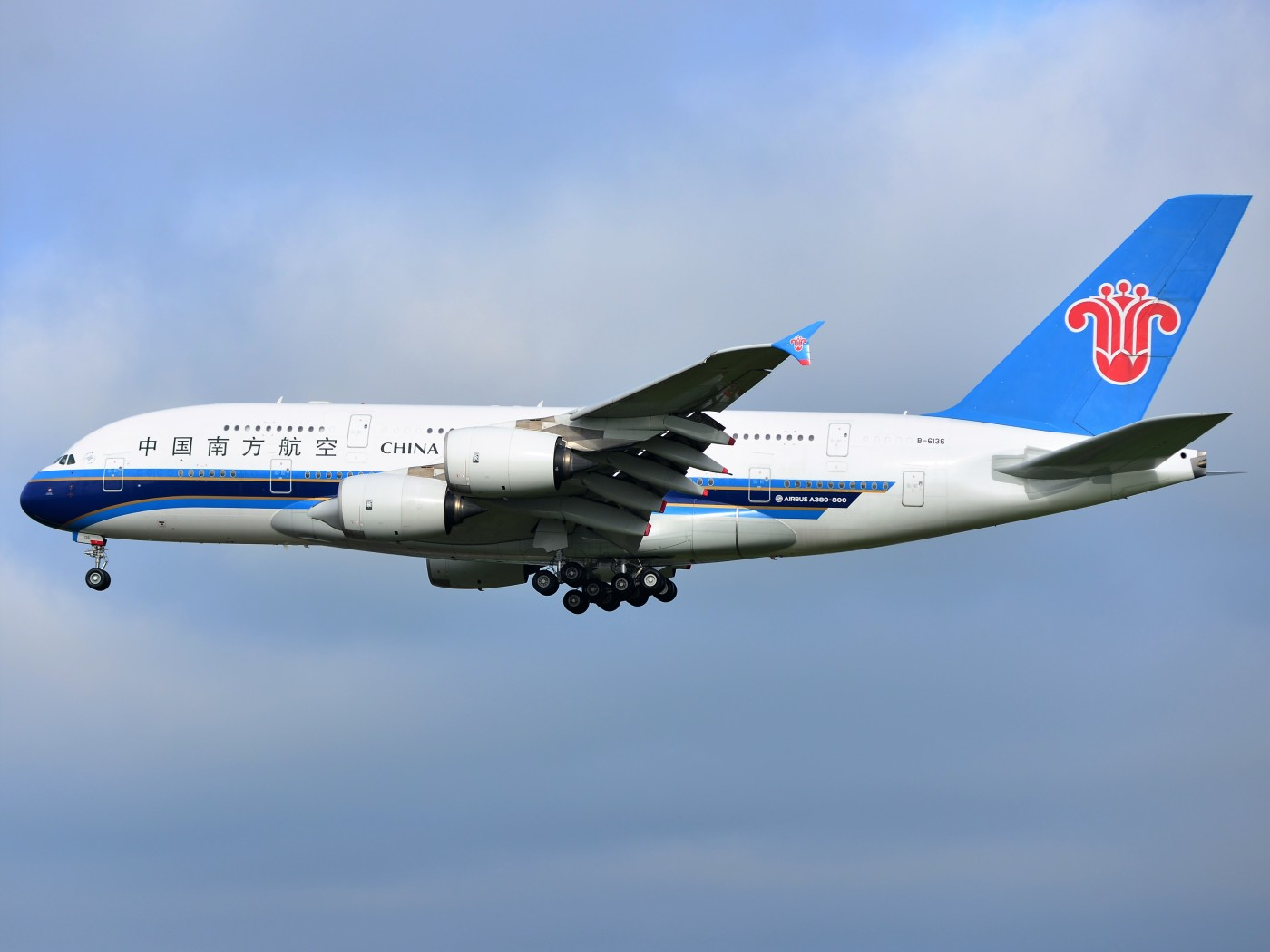
Airbus A380-800 in 2022

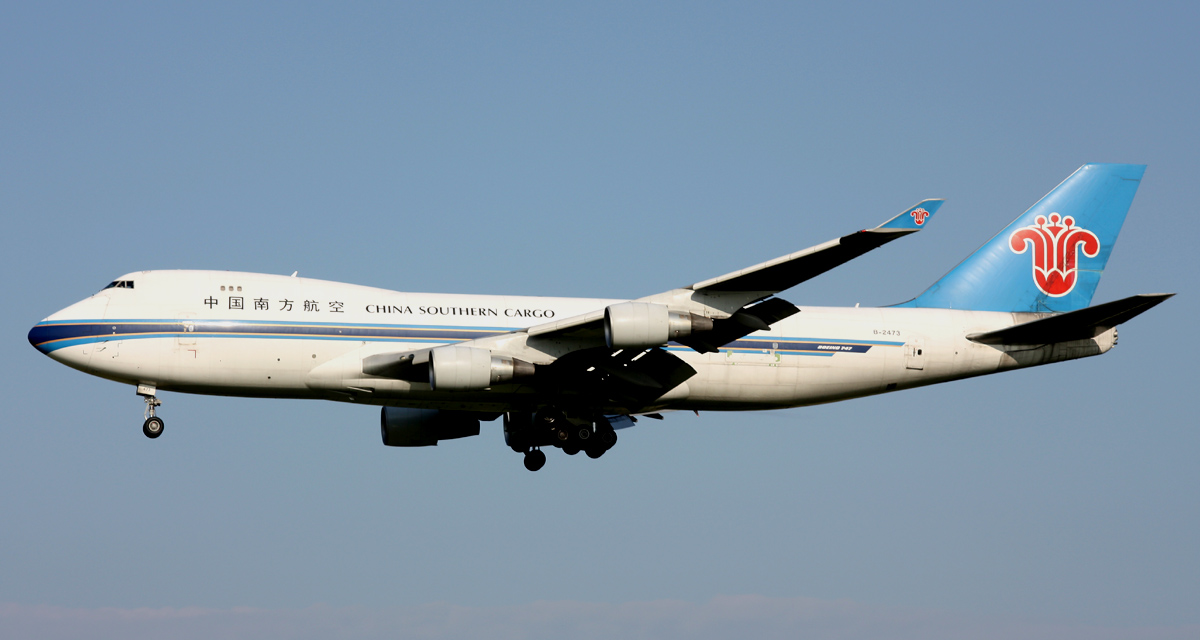
Boeing 747-400F in 2009

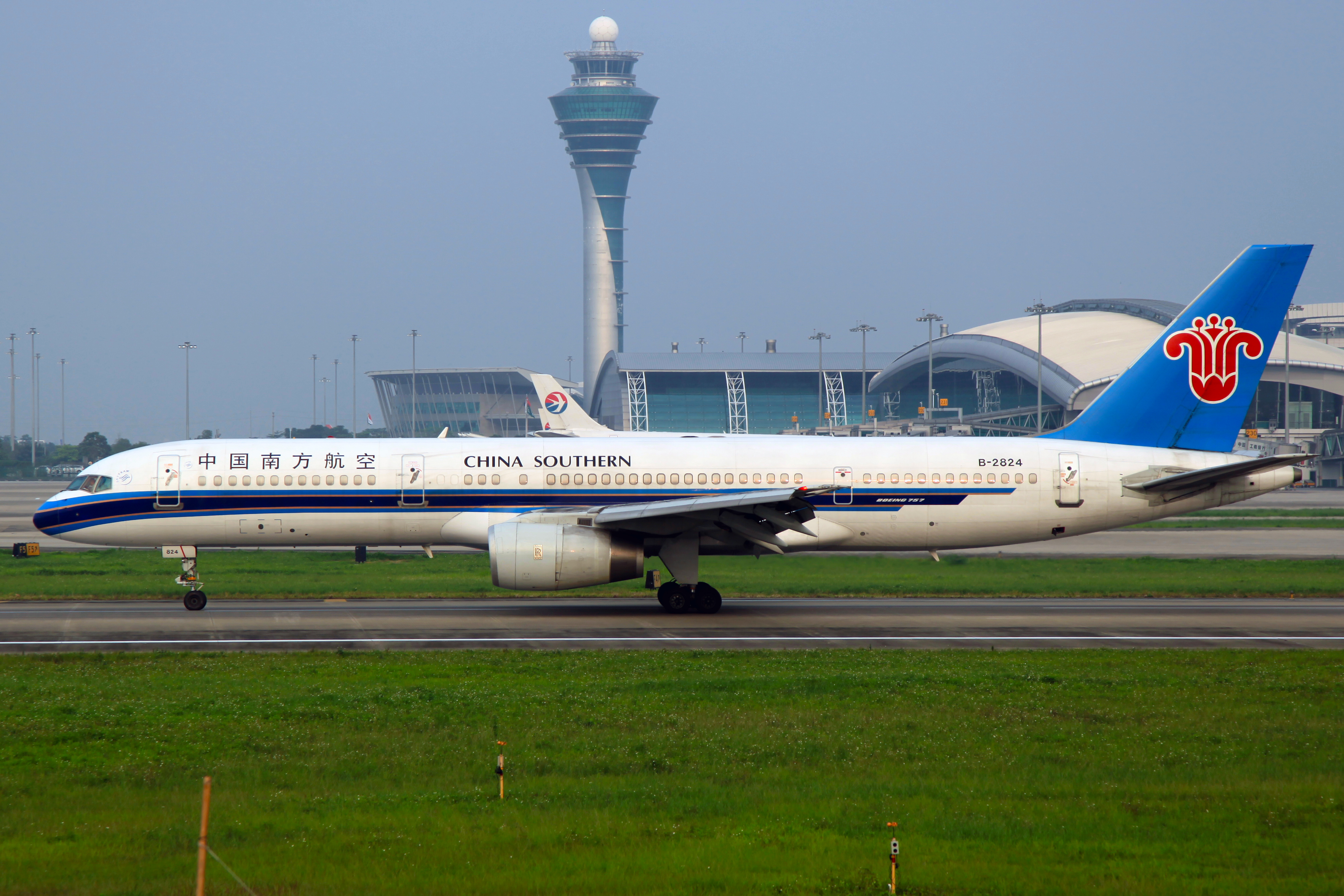
Boeing 757-200 in 2013

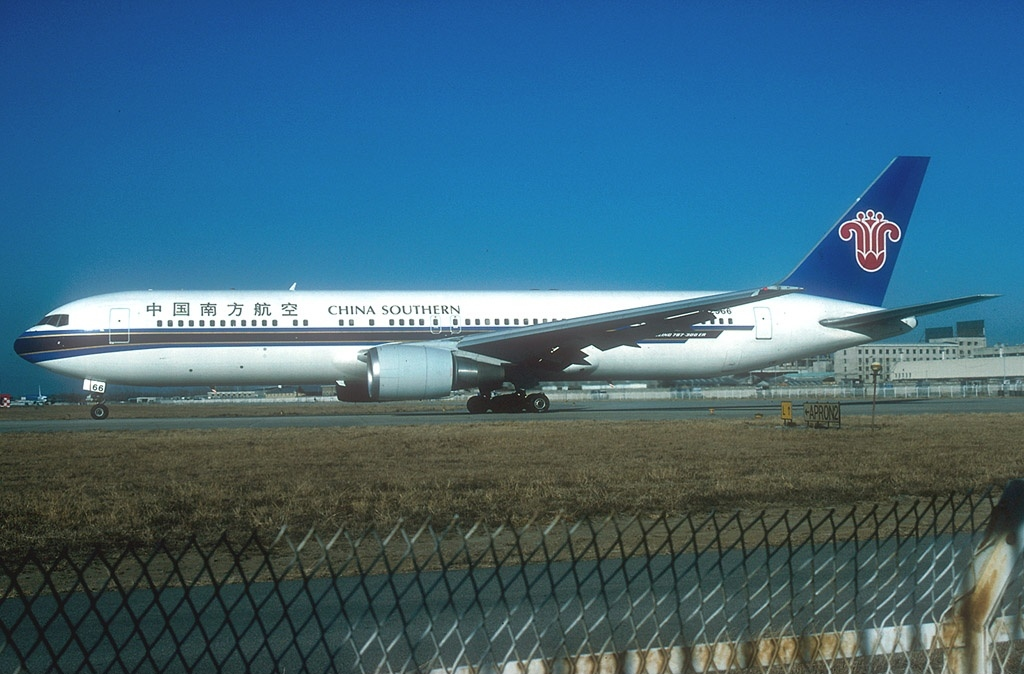
Boeing 767-300ER in 1997

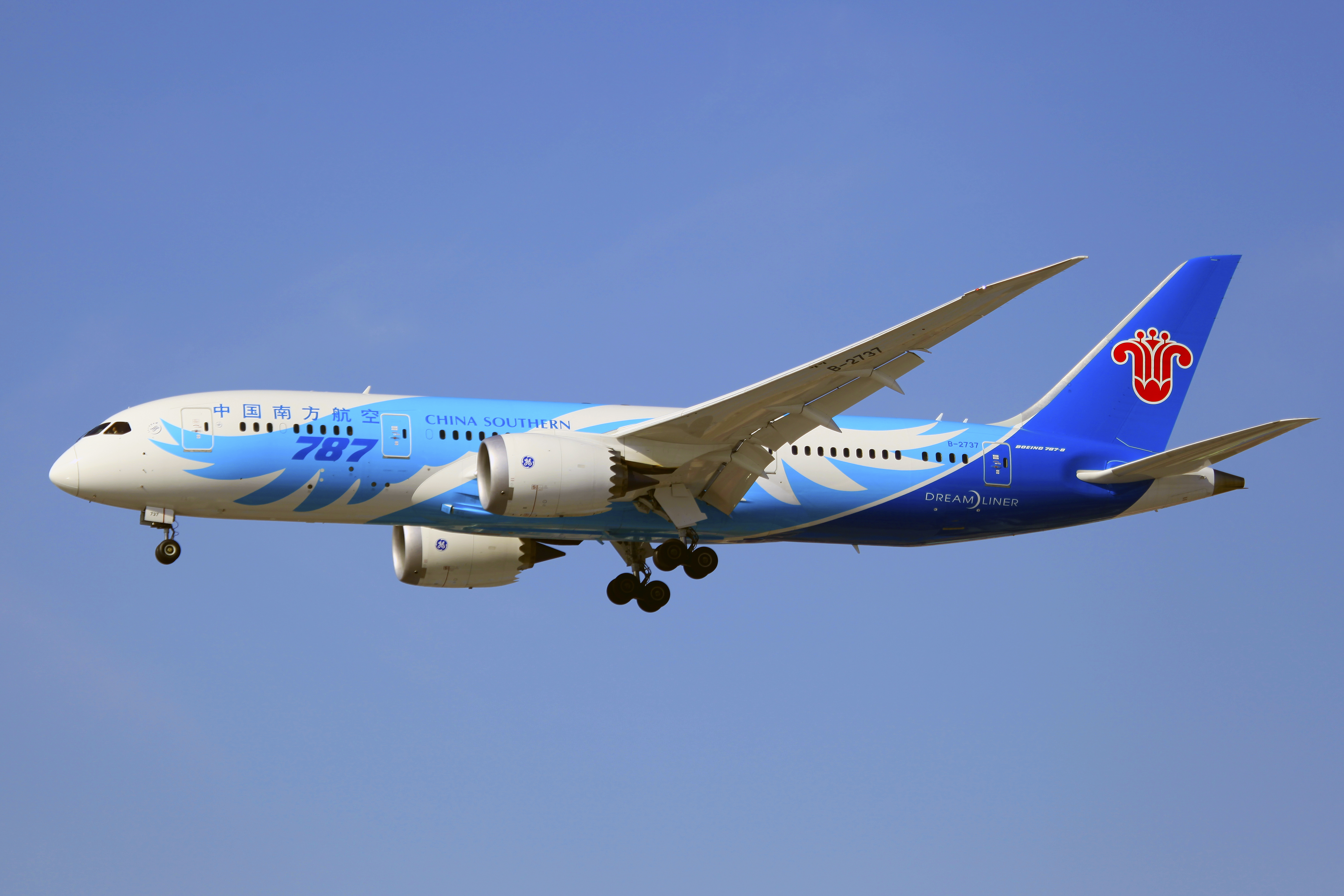
Boeing 787-8 in 2014

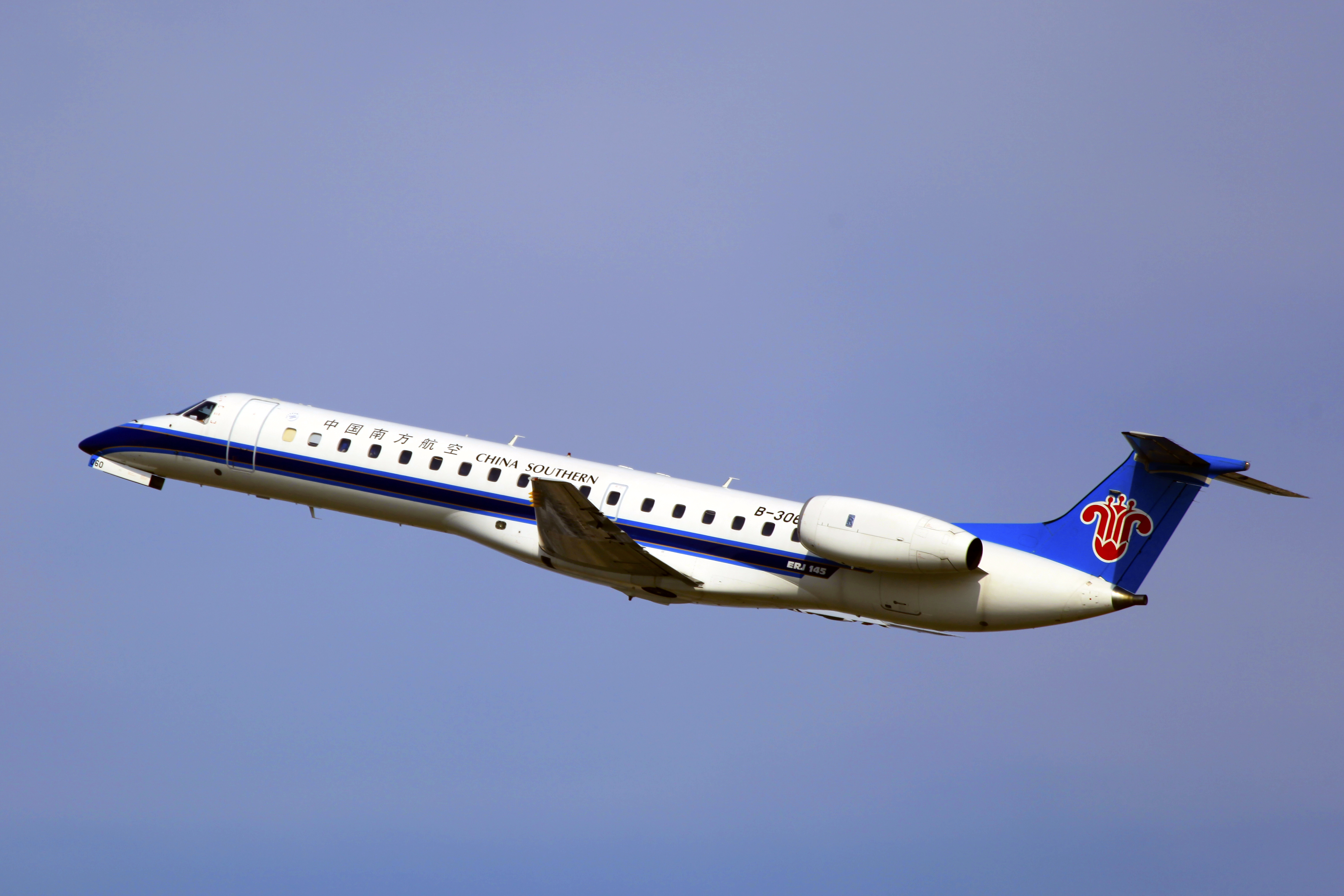
Embraer ERJ-145 in 2013

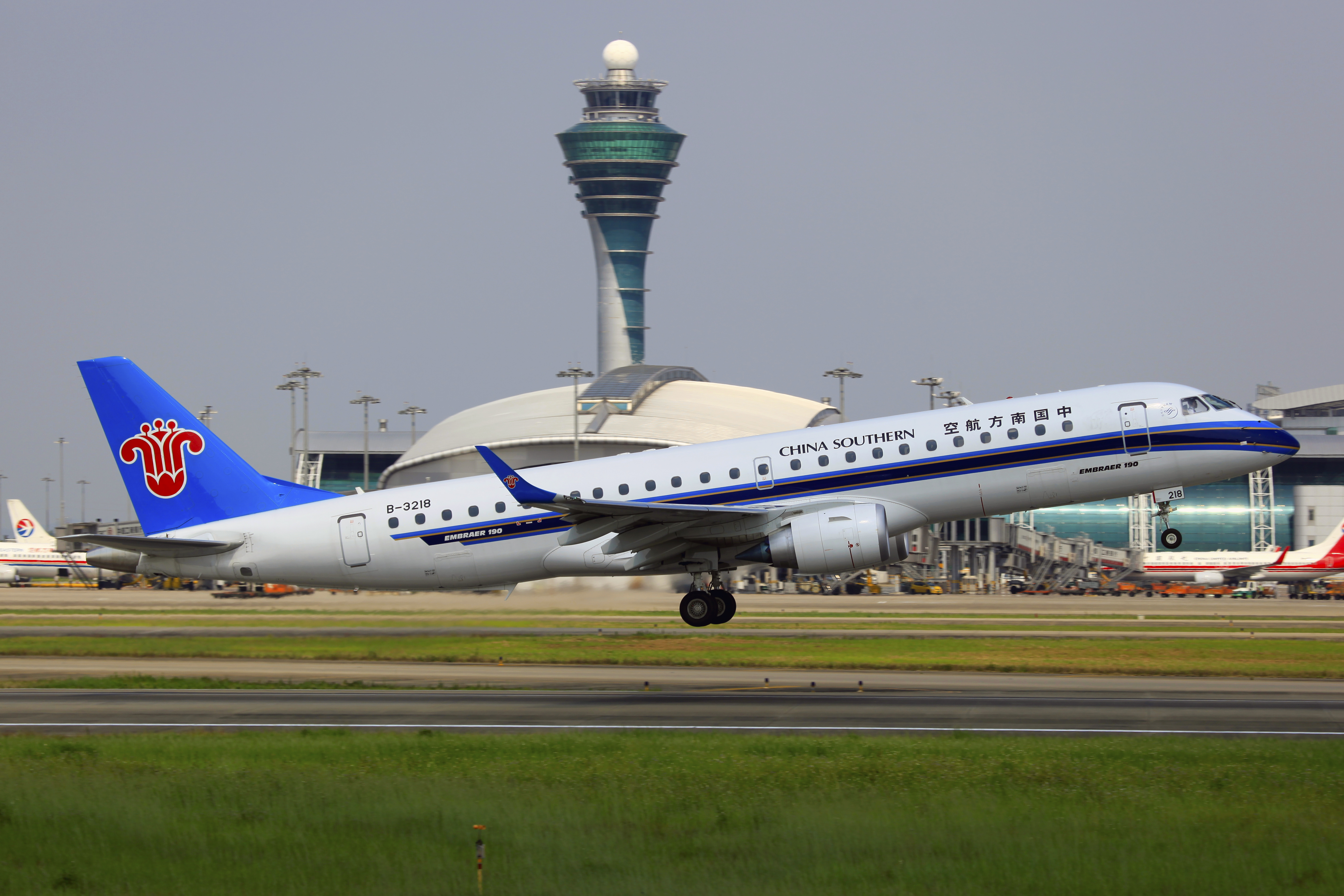
Embraer E190 in 2013

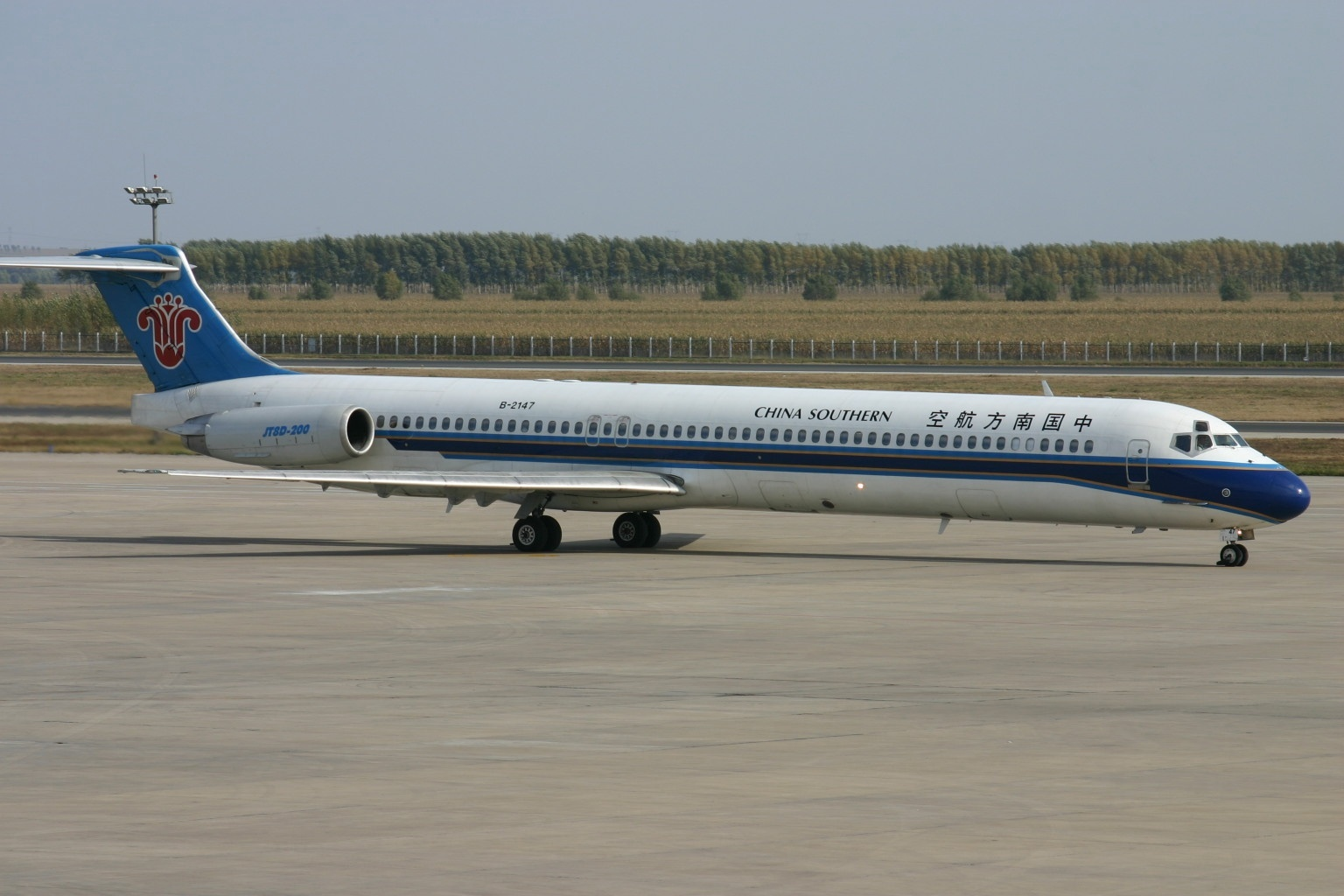
McDonnell Douglas MD-82 in 2012

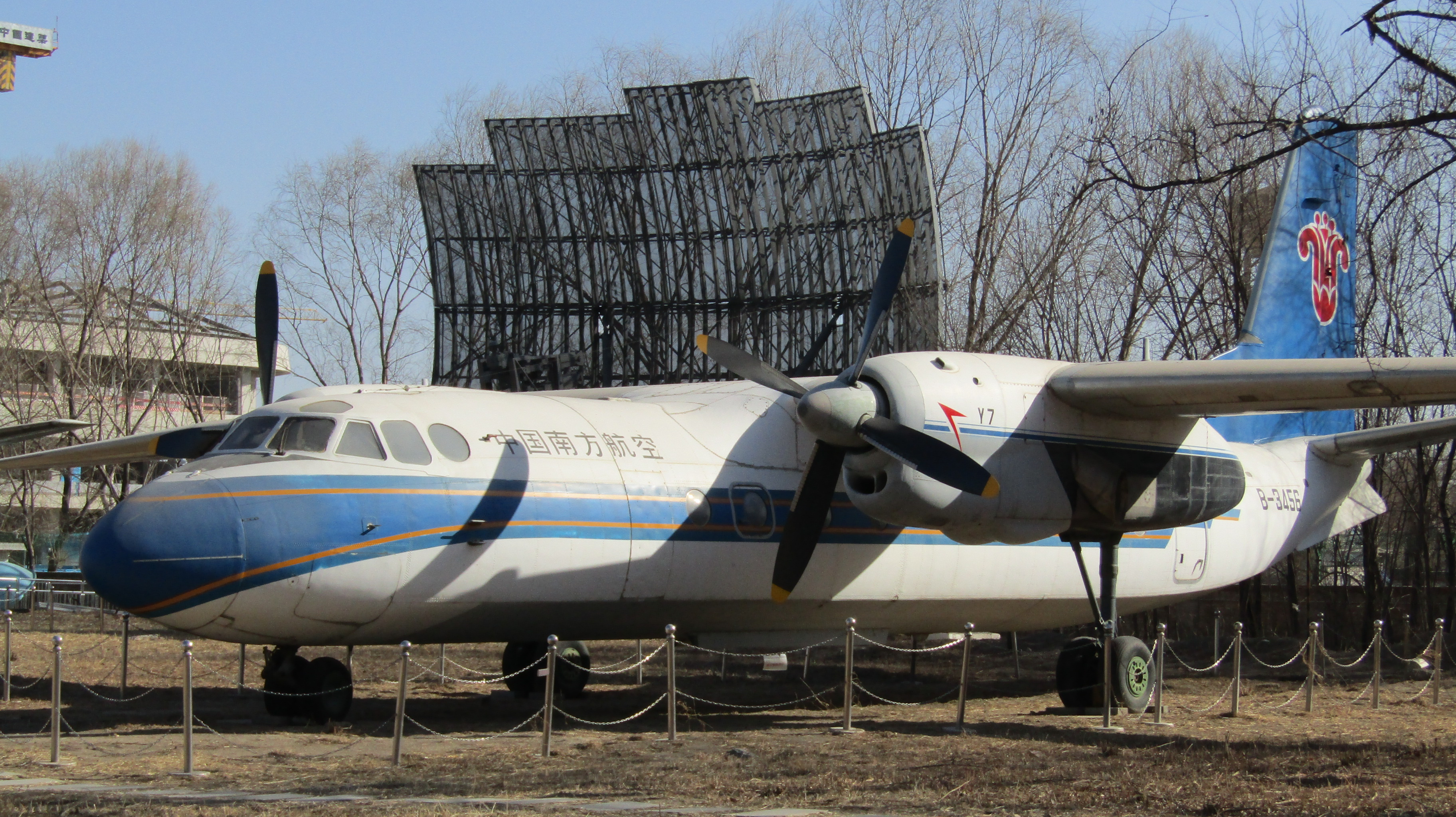
A former Xian Y-7 at Beijing Civil Aviation Museum

China Southern Airlines previously operated the following aircraft:

China Southern Airlines retired fleet
Aircraft	Number	Introduced	Retired	Notes	Refs
ATR 72-500	5	2004	2011		
Airbus A300-600	6	2004	2011		
Airbus A319-100	9	2003	2024		
Airbus A330-200	16	2005	2025		
Airbus A380-800	5	2011	2022		
Boeing 737-200	10	1991	1995		
Boeing 737-300	36	1991	2015	After retirement, most aircraft were converted into freighters.	
Boeing 737-500	12	1991	2009		
Boeing 737-700	37	2003	2026		
Boeing 747-400F	2	2002	2022	Disposed to SF Airlines.	
Boeing 757-200	32	1991	2018	After retirement, most aircraft were converted into freighters.	
Boeing 767-300	6	1992	1998		
Boeing 777-200	10	1997	2018		
Boeing 777-200ER	6	1997	2014		
Boeing 787-8	10	2013	2025	Sold to Avalon Leasing. All are transferred to Thai Airways International.	
Embraer E145	6	2004	2015		
Embraer E190	20	2011	2021		
McDonnell Douglas MD-82	23	2003	2008	The last one left in 2010.	
McDonnell Douglas MD-90	13	2004	2011	Disposed to Delta Air Lines.	
Saab 340	4	1992	1997	Disposed to Shandong Airlines.	
Short 360	3	1991	1994	One aircraft scrapped in 2002. Remainder disposed to Servicios Aéreos Profesionales.	
Xian Y-7	Unknown	1991	Unknown		

==== Airbus A380 ====
China Southern was the only mainland Chinese airline to operate the Airbus A380. The airline initially operated these aircraft on Beijing–Hong Kong and Beijing–Guangzhou routes. However, these services struggled to be profitable. Due to the demand limitation of the airline's home base at Guangzhou Baiyun International Airport, few routes from Guangzhou have the demand to support an A380. In efforts to make its A380s viable, China Southern started operating A380 on its Guangzhou–Los Angeles route and on the Guangzhou–Sydney route. Additionally, China Southern flew A380s to Sydney and Melbourne every summer during its peak travel period. As of 20 June 2015, China Southern began operating the Airbus A380 from Beijing to Amsterdam. The A380 also operated four domestic flights each day between Beijing and Guangzhou. The airline's A380s were retired by November 2022.

=== Special liveries gallery ===
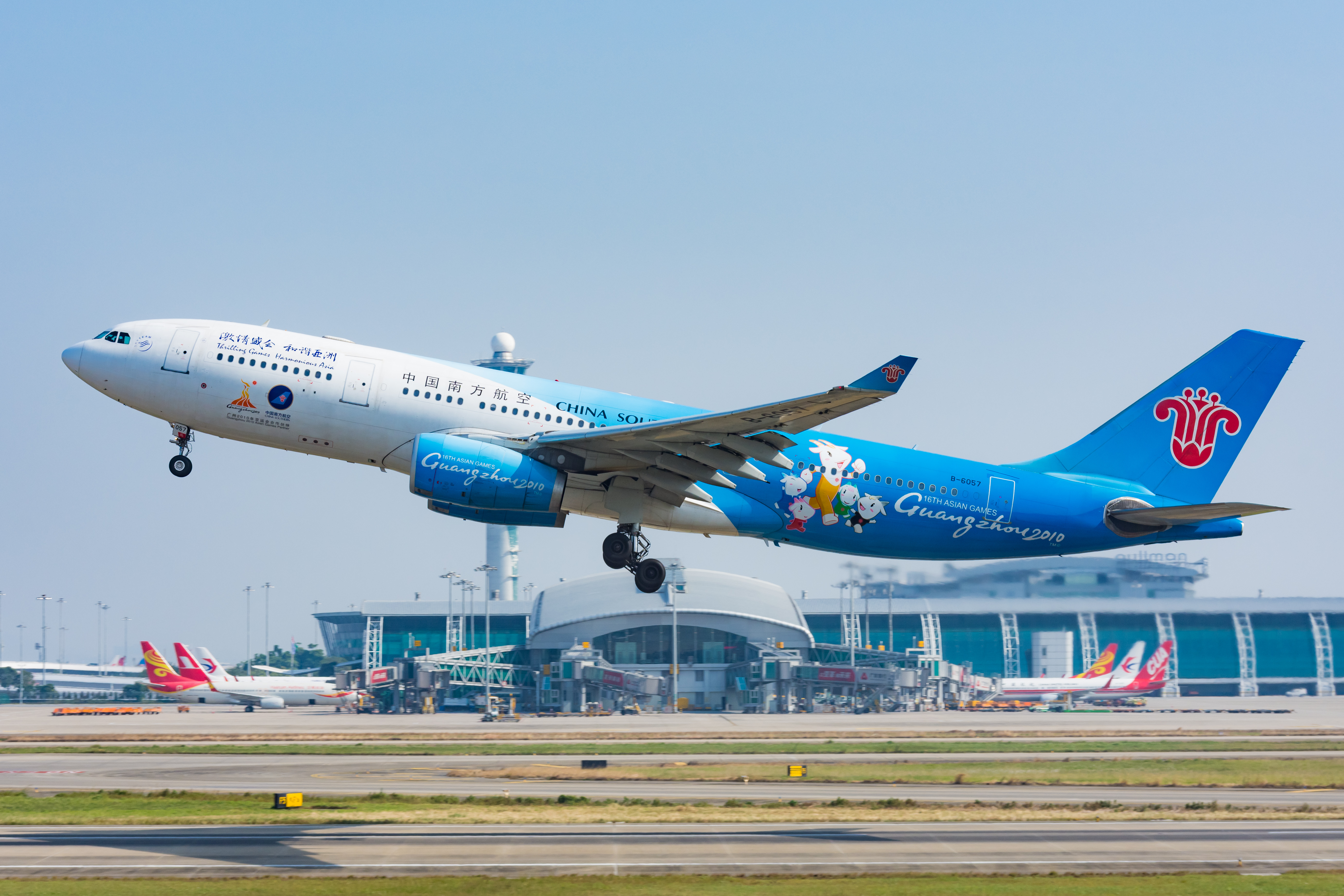
Airbus A330-243 (B-6057) in 2010 Asian Games livery

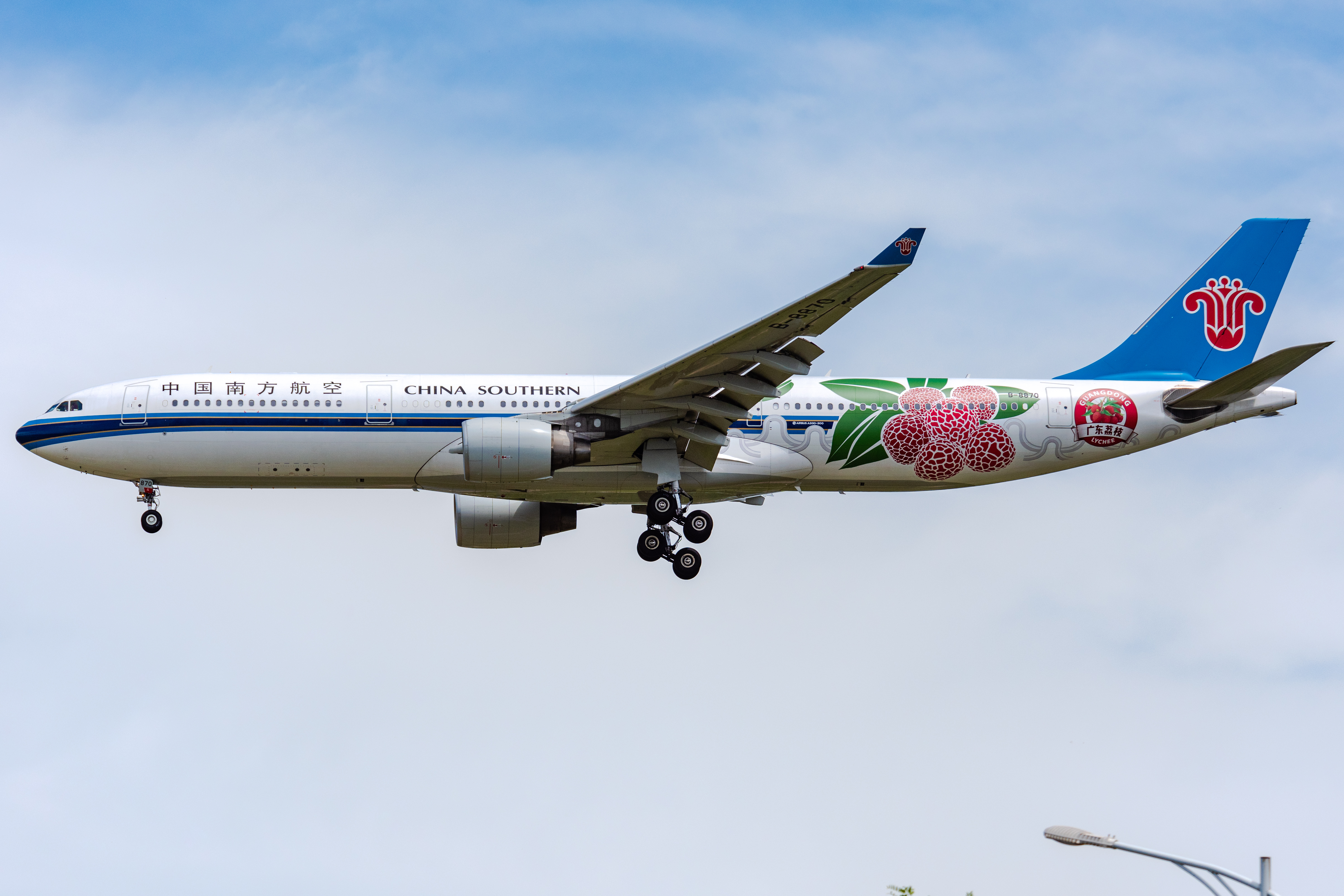
Airbus A330-323 (B-8870) in Canton Lychee livery

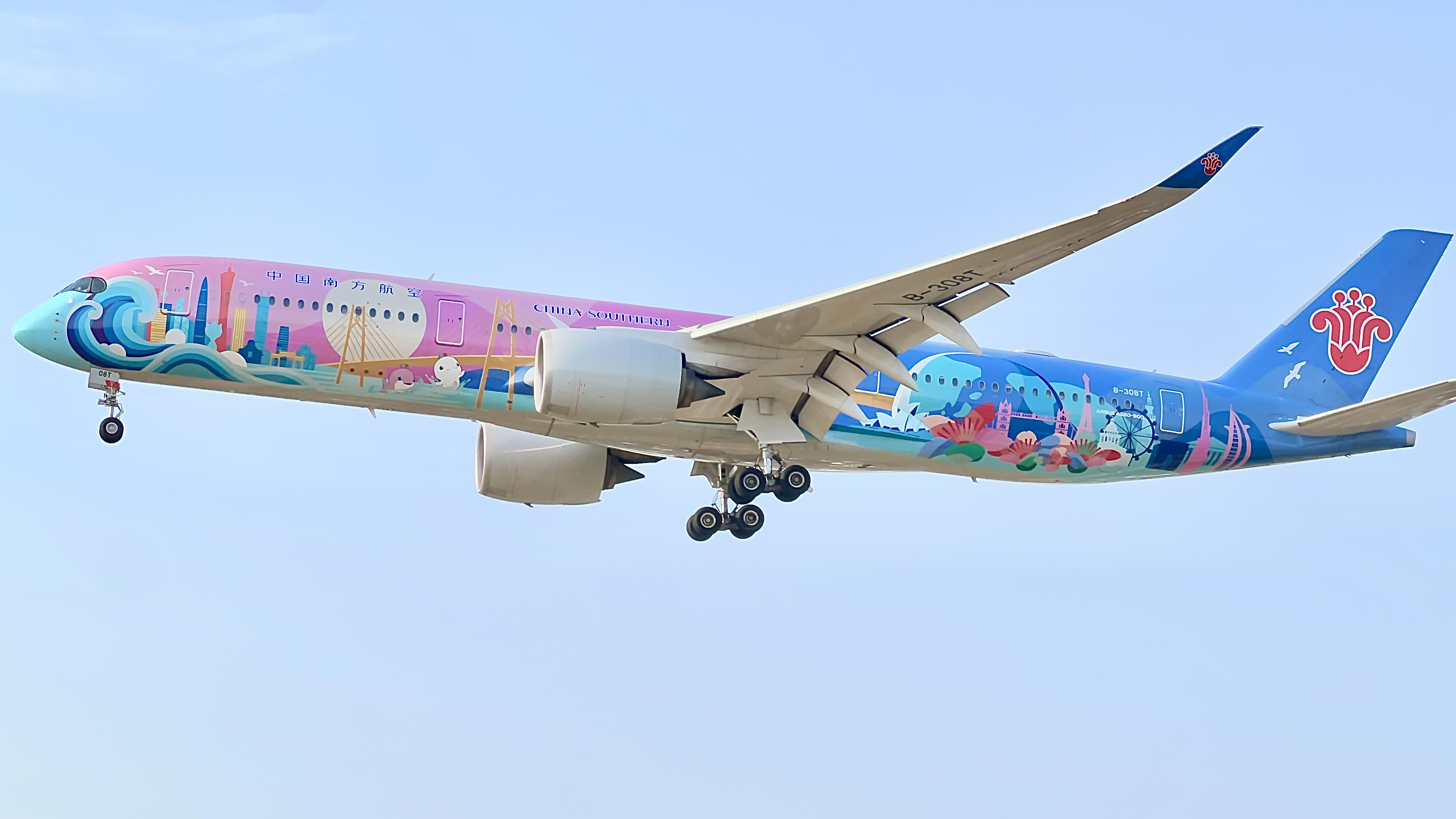
Airbus A350-941 (B-308T) in 15th National Games livery

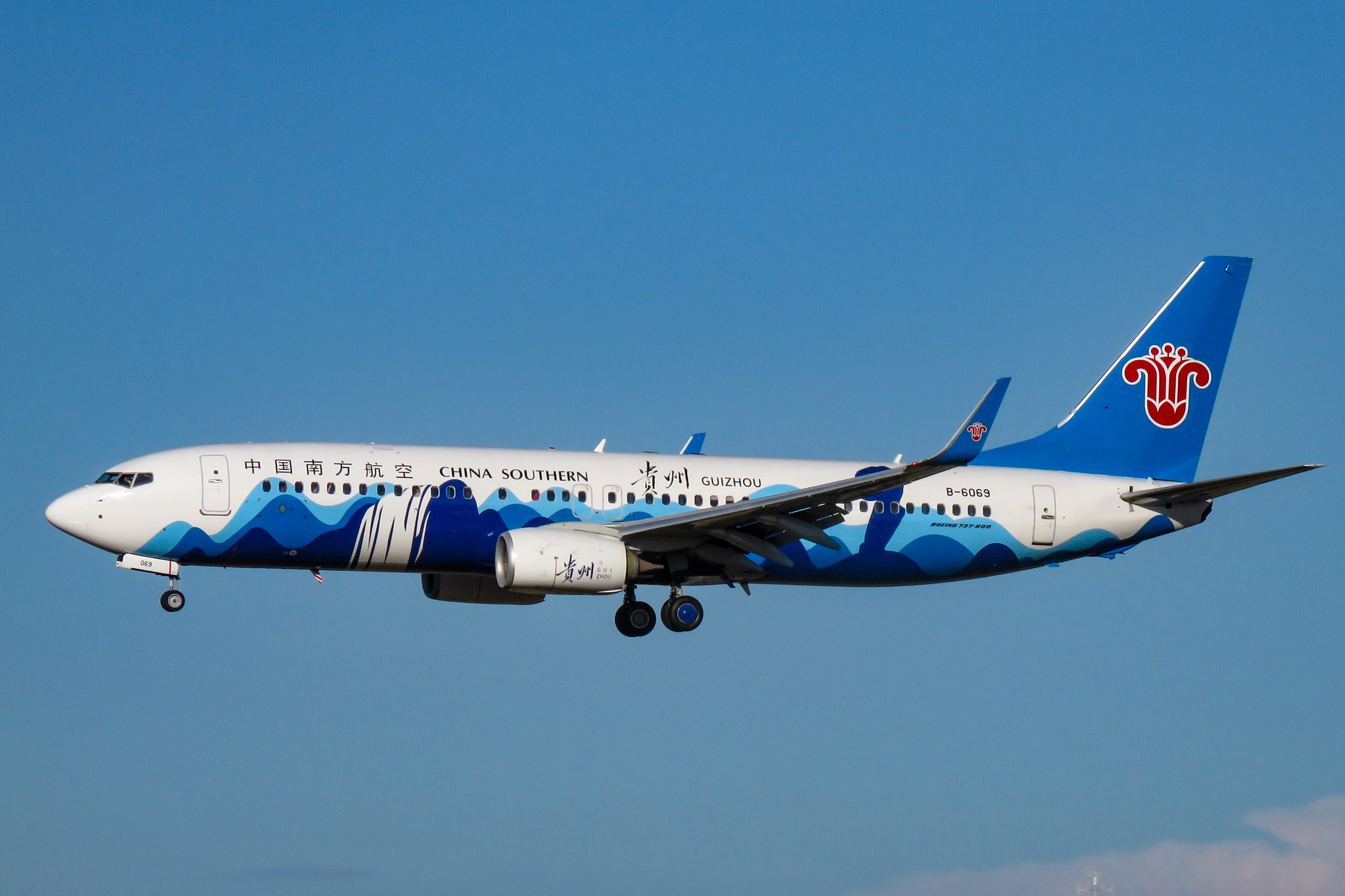
Boeing 737-800 (B-6069) in Guizhou livery

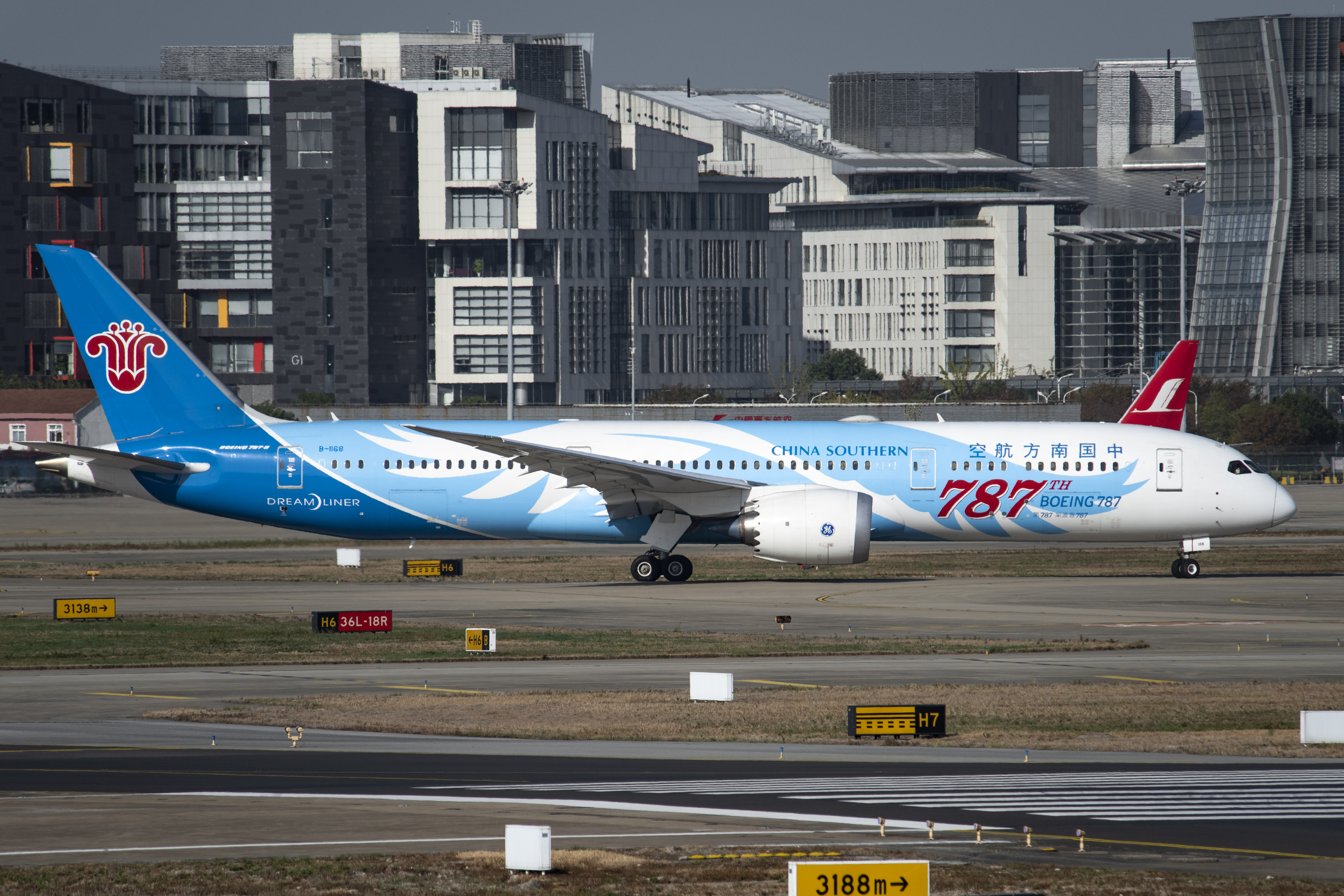
Boeing 787-9 Dreamliner (B-1168) with "787th Boeing 787" logo

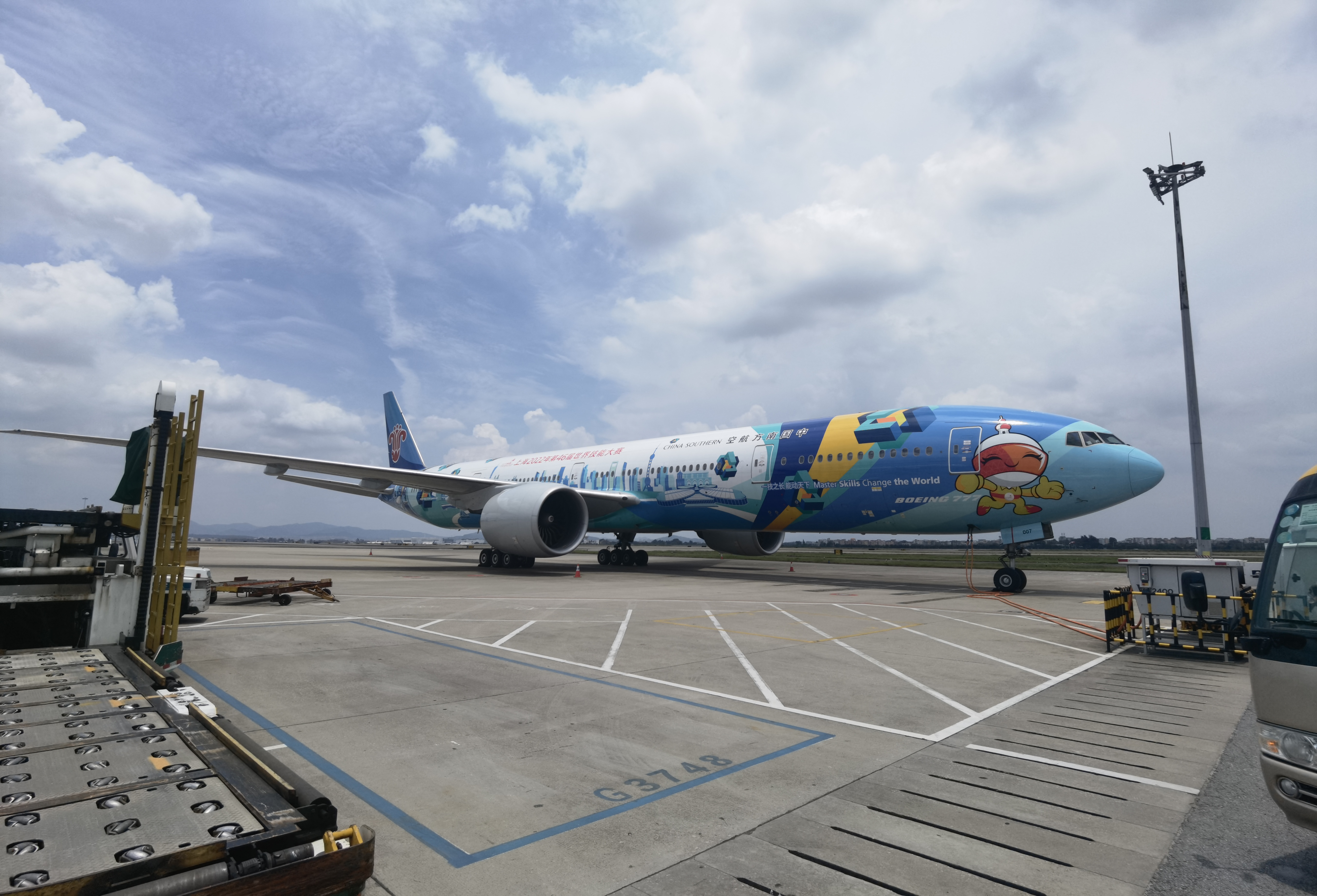
Boeing 777-300ER (B-2007) in WorldSkills livery

== Services ==
China Southern Airlines offers First Class (formerly), Business Class, Premium Economy and Economy Class.

First Class

China Southern Airlines offered an "Experience Luxurious Skybed" on Boeing 787s. It was equipped with personal privacy, in-built massage, a 17-inch personal TV and fully reclining seat. It also had First Class on Airbus A330s and Boeing 777-300ERs, which featured a seat pitch of 84 inches (210 cm) and converted into a fully flat bed with a personal TV.

China Southern Airlines offered Premium First Class on select flights, such as on the Beijing-Guangzhou route. This cabin offered more amenities and was more spacious than Regular First Class, such as a variety of lighting options and a private storage cabinet with a password lock.

Business Class

Business class also offers a fully flat bed, and an adjustable privacy divider. It includes a USB port and a reading light. It also has a 15-inch TV.

Economy Class

Economy class features a seat and a 9-inch personal TV. It also has a multi-adjustable headrest.

Premium Economy Class

China Southern also offers Premium Economy class, which is more spacious than economy class. In most aircraft, the seats are 35–37 inches (89–94 cm), compared to 31 inches (79 cm) in Economy. The Boeing 777-300ERs, however, are equipped with fixed-shell premium economy seats similar to those seen on Air France's Boeing 777s.

== Sky Pearl Club ==
China Southern Airlines's frequent-flyer program is called Sky Pearl Club (simplified Chinese: 明珠俱乐部; traditional Chinese: 明珠俱樂部; pinyin: Míngzhū Jùlèbù; Jyutping: ming4 zyu1 keoi1 lok6 bou6). The Sky Pearl Club allows its members to earn FFP mileage not only by flying China Southern domestic segments, but also by flying routes of other codeshare member airlines. Additionally, Sky Pearl Club members can earn and use mileage on partnered Sichuan Airlines, China Eastern Airlines, and China Airlines flights. Membership of Sky Pearl Club is divided into four tiers: Sky Pearl Gold Card, Sky Pearl Silver Card, Sky Pearl Member Card and Little Pearl On The Palm Card, the first three tier are available for all adult members, but Little Pearl On The Palm Card is only available for members aged 2–11.

== Incidents and accidents ==
- On 24 November 1992, China Southern Airlines Flight 3943, a Boeing 737-300, crashed into a hill near Guilin, Guangxi, due to an engine thrust malfunction. All 141 people on board were killed.
- On 8 May 1997, China Southern Flight 3456, a Boeing 737-300, crashed on approach to Shenzhen Bao'an International Airport killing 35 people and injuring 9.

== Controversies ==
=== Shipping of primates to laboratories ===
The USDA ordered China Southern Airlines to pay $11,600 in fines for violations of the Animal Welfare Act (AWA) during the airline's transport of animals without proper licences to the United States. Although the USDA cited Air Transport International for failure to provide food and water to the imported animals, China Southern Airlines was previously also ordered to pay $14,438 for AWA violations during one transport that left more than a dozen monkeys dead after they went without food and water for an extended period of time. Following these most recent violations, where the delivered animals were left neglected after arrival in the US, China Southern announced that it would no longer transport laboratory animals to the US. PETA had protested against the airline for these shipments.

=== 10-yuan ticketing glitch ===
In November 2023, the airline inadvertently priced its tickets as low as 10 yuan (around $1.37) on its mobile app and travel websites like Trip.com, due to a technical glitch. The airline later confirmed on Weibo that the tickets sold during the two-hour window would be honored.

== See also ==
- Civil aviation in China
- List of airlines of China
- Transport in China
