= GAMECO =

Chinese aircraft maintenance company

Guangzhou Aircraft Maintenance Engineering Company Limited 广州飞机维修工程有限公司
- Type: Private
- Industry: Aerospace
- Founded: October 28, 1989; 36 years ago
- Headquarters: Guangzhou, China
- Services: aircraft maintenance, component repair and painting facilities
- Owner: China Southern Airlines (50%); CK Hutchison (50%)
- Number of employees: over 4,500
- Website: www.gameco.com.cn

Guangzhou Aircraft Maintenance Engineering Company Limited (Chinese: 广州飞机维修工程有限公司), better known as GAMECO, is an aircraft maintenance company in Guangzhou, China. Located at Guangzhou Baiyun International Airport, GAMECO provides maintenance, repair and overhaul (MRO) services. It is co-owned by China Southern Airlines and Hutchison China, a subsidiary of Hong Kong conglomerate CK Hutchison.

== History ==
=== Founding ===
GAMECO is founded as a joint venture of China Southern Airlines, Hutchison A/C Maintenance Investment and South China Int'l A/C Engineering in October 1989. China Southern Airlines is also the biggest customer of GAMECO. The swift progress made by CSN promotes GAMECO's development.

=== Awards ===
GAMECO ranks No.6 of Top 10 Airframe MRO 2014 by Aviation Week in May, 2015.

== Facility ==
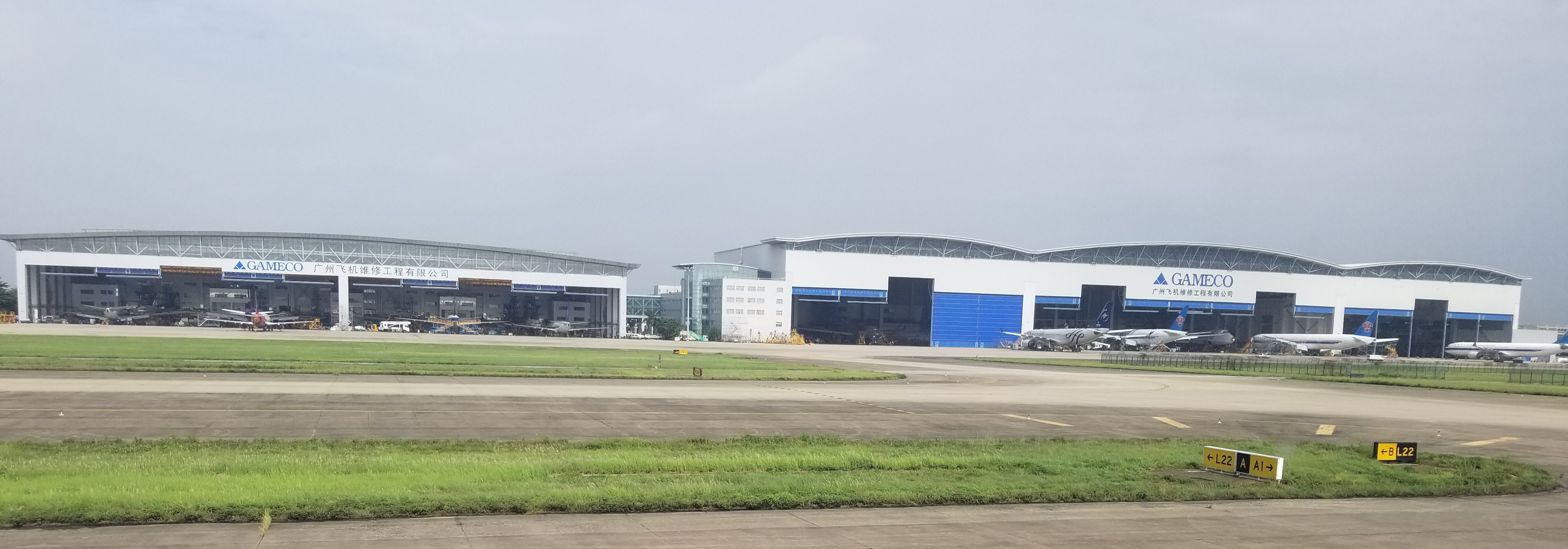
GAMECO hangars at Guangzhou Baiyun International Airport

=== Hangars ===
Phase I hangar is located at Guangzhou Baiyun International Airport. As the largest truss structure hangar in China, the main hall can accommodate 4 wide-body aircraft, or 12 narrow-body aircraft for all level maintenance. The dedicated paint hangar is equipped with advanced control system of ventilation, temperature and humidity for one A380 or B747 aircraft painting.

The Phase II Hangar is located to the south of the Maintenance Base and started service in 2013, offering eight maintenance bays. The sophisticated docking systems are installed in four bays for heavy maintenance of narrow-body aircraft. The rest bays can support short time or line maintenance services for any type of aircraft except A380.

GAMECO plans to build a Phase III wide-body aircraft hangar on the northern end of the Maintenance Base. The third hangar will be able to concurrently hold four widebodies and eight narrowbodies. It will receive 72% of GAMECO's business from maintaining the fleet of China Southern Airlines, to allow bringing in more third party work.

== See also ==
- China Southern Airlines - shareholders and main customer
