= Cathay Dragon =

Regional airline of Hong Kong, 1985–2020

Cathay Dragon 國泰港龍

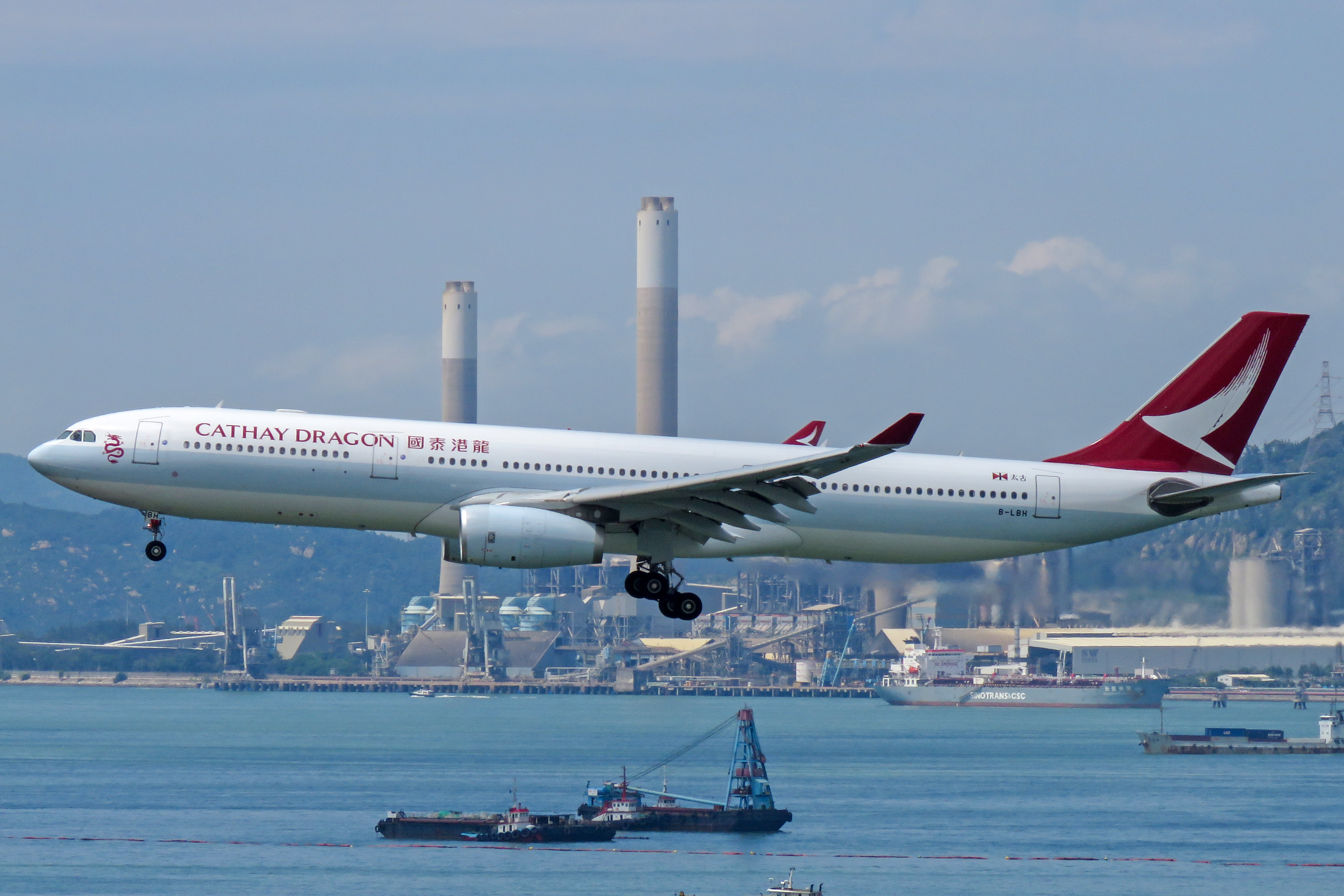
- Cathay Dragon Airbus A330-300 in 2018
| IATA | ICAO | Call sign |
|---|---|---|
| KA | HDA | DRAGON |
- Founded: 24 May 1985 (as Dragonair)
- Commenced operations: July 1985 (as Dragonair); 21 November 2016 (as Cathay Dragon)
- Ceased operations: 21 October 2020 (merged into Cathay Pacific)
- Hubs: Hong Kong–Kai Tak (1985–1998); Hong Kong–Chek Lap Kok (1998–2020)
- Frequent-flyer program: Asia Miles; Marco Polo Club
- Alliance: Oneworld (affiliate; 2007–2020)
- Parent company: Cathay Pacific
- Headquarters: Cathay Dragon House, Hong Kong International Airport, Chek Lap Kok, Hong Kong
- Key people: Chao Kuang Piu (Honorary chairman); Augustus Tang (Chairman); Algernon Yau (CEO)

Cathay Dragon
- Traditional Chinese: 國泰港龍航空
- Simplified Chinese: 国泰港龙航空
- Cantonese Yale: Gwoktaai Gónglùng Hònghūng
Transcriptions
Standard Mandarin
- Hanyu Pinyin: Guótài Gǎnglóng Hángkōng
- Wade–Giles: Kuo^{2}-tʻai^{4} Kang^{3}-lung^{2} Hang^{2}-kʻung^{1}
Yue: Cantonese
- Yale Romanization: Gwoktaai Gónglùng Hònghūng
- Jyutping: Gwok3taai3 Gong2lung4 Hong4hung1

Hong Kong Dragon Airlines Limited (Chinese: 港龍航空公司), originally known as Dragonair until 2016 and finally Cathay Dragon (國泰港龍航空) until 2020, was a Hong Kong-based international regional airline, with its corporate headquarters and main hub at Hong Kong International Airport. In the final year before it ceased flying, the airline operated a scheduled passenger network to around 50 destinations in 14 countries and territories across Asia. Additionally, the airline had three codeshares on routes served by partner airlines. It had an all-Airbus fleet of 35 aircraft, consisting of A320s, A321s and A330s.

Cathay Dragon was a wholly owned subsidiary of Cathay Pacific, and was an affiliate member of the Oneworld airline alliance. The airline was founded on 24 May 1985, by Chao Kuang Piu, who was most recently the airline's honorary chairman. Its maiden flight departed Hong Kong for Kota Kinabalu, Sabah, Malaysia, after being granted an air operator's certificate (AOC) by the Hong Kong Government in July 1985. In 2010, Dragonair, together with its parent, Cathay Pacific, operated over 138,000 flights, carried nearly 27 million passengers and over 1.80 billion kg (4.0 billion pounds) of cargo and mail.

== History ==
Dragonair's logo from 1985 to 2016.

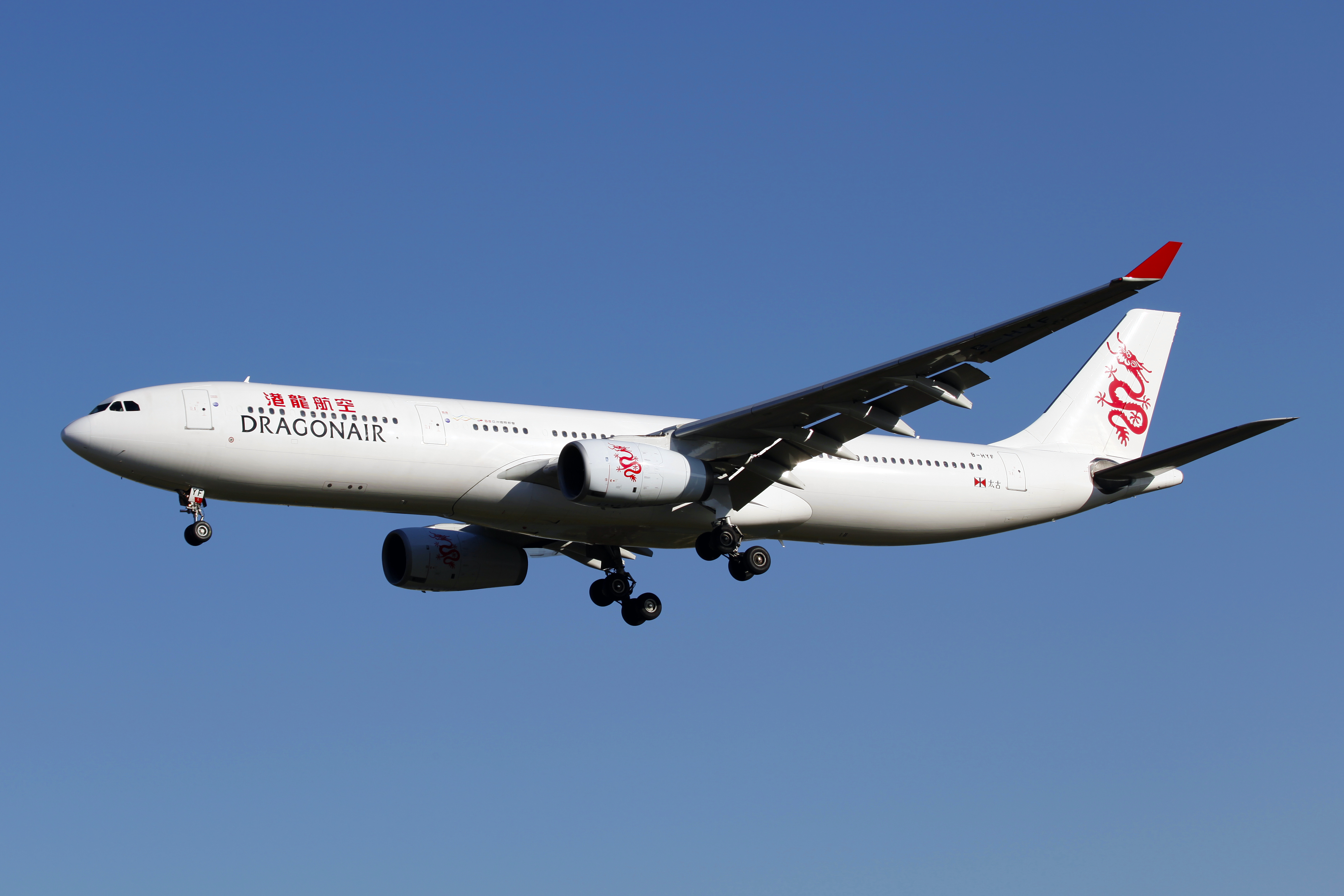
A Dragonair Airbus A330-300 in the 1992–2016 livery

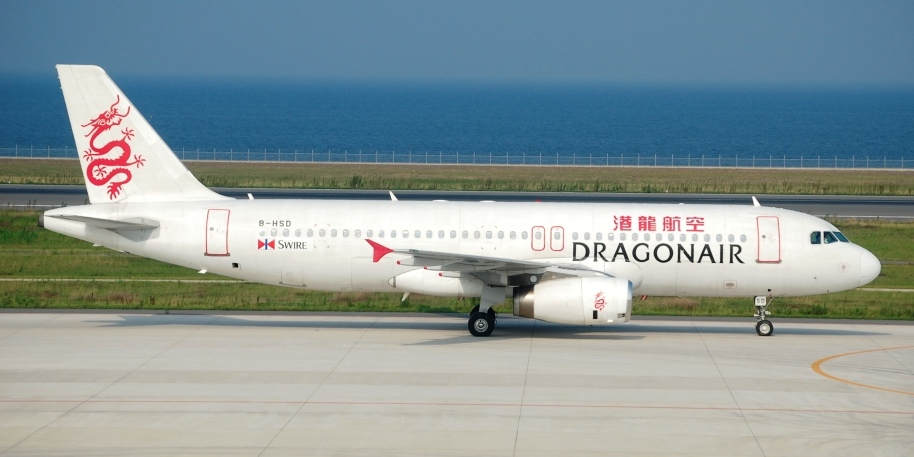
Airbus A320-200

=== Early beginnings ===
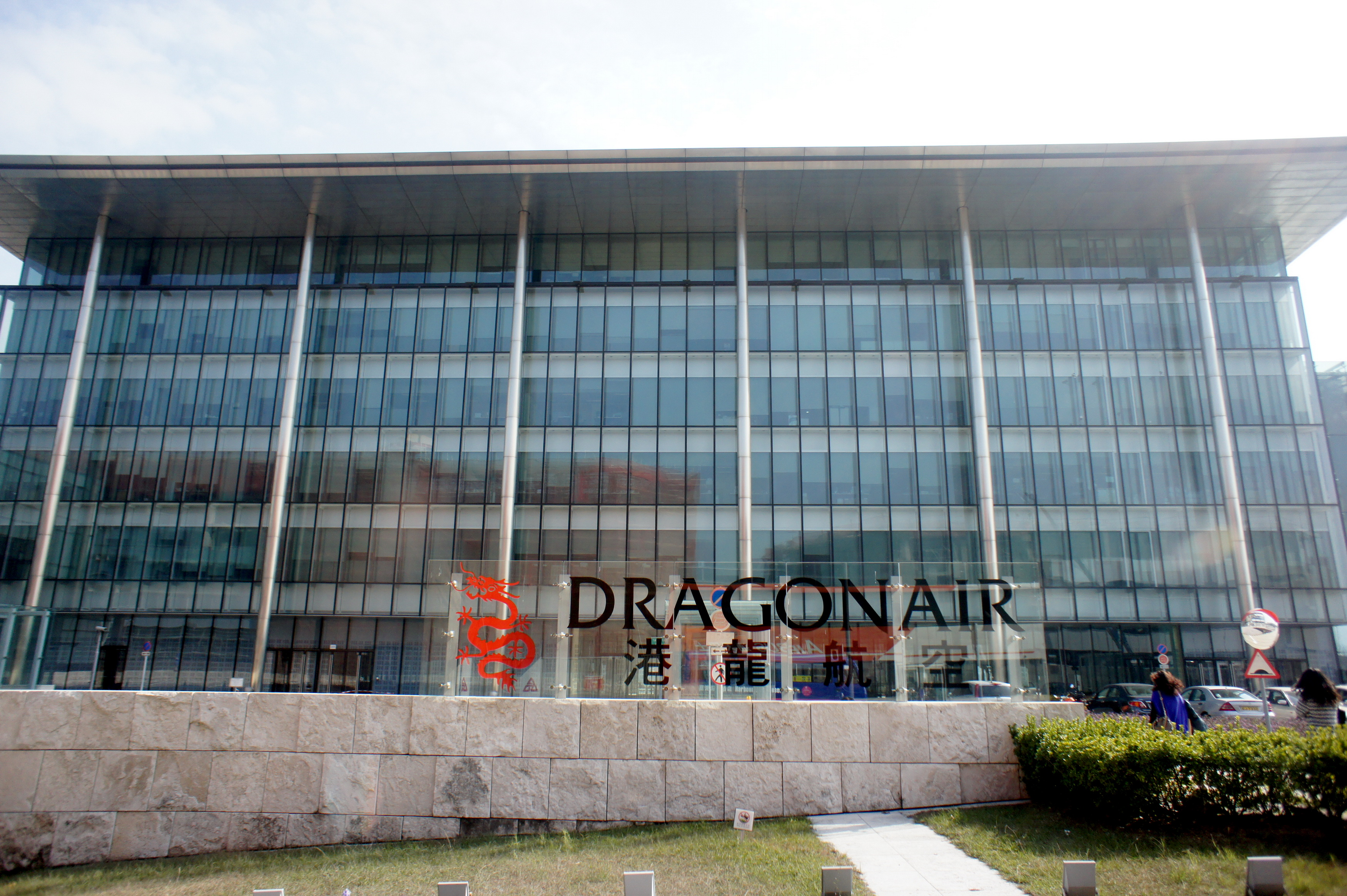
Cathay Dragon House, the head office at Hong Kong International Airport

The airline was established in Hong Kong on 24 May 1985, on the initiative of Chao Kuang Piu as a subsidiary of Hong Kong Macau International Investment Co. It started operations in July 1985 with a Boeing 737-200 service from Kai Tak Airport to Kota Kinabalu International Airport in Malaysia, after receiving an Air Operator's Certificate (AOC) from the Hong Kong Government. The airline began services to Phuket International Airport in Thailand, as well as six secondary cities in mainland China on a regular charter basis in 1986. In 1987, the airline became the first Hong Kong-based airline to join as an active member of the International Air Transport Association (IATA).

Dragonair was the first local competitor for Hong Kong's largest airline, Cathay Pacific, in forty years; and since the airline's inception, Cathay Pacific had fought vigorously to block the airline's flight-slot applications. In January 1987, the airline announced its expansion with the order of two long-range McDonnell Douglas MD-11 aircraft. However, after a heated hearing before Hong Kong's Air Transport Licensing Authority, the Hong Kong government adopted a one-route-one-airline policy, which lasted until 2001. The airline was not able to gain the scheduled routes it needed to compete effectively. The airline was disadvantaged in that Hong Kong's financial secretary back then, Sir John Bremridge, was a former Cathay Pacific chairman.

Stephen Miller, Dragonair's first CEO, said:

Our arrival on the scene was not hailed very enthusiastically by the then Hong Kong Government...we got a lot of opposition from Cathay (Pacific).

It was later discovered that Cathay Pacific was concentrating on a boom in travel elsewhere in the 1980s and had left the undeveloped mainland China market to Dragonair. Forced into accepting less-desirable routes, the young airline focused on the mainland.

=== 1990s ===
In January 1990, Cathay Pacific, Swire and CITIC Pacific acquired an 89 percent stake in the airline, with CITIC Pacific holding 38 percent; while the family of the airline's chairman, Kuang-Piu Chao, reduced their holding from 22 percent to 6 percent, with the remainder held by minor shareholders. The change of ownership saw Cathay Pacific transferring its Beijing and Shanghai routes to Dragonair, along with a Lockheed L-1011 TriStar on a lease basis. The first Airbus A320 joined the airline's fleet in March 1993 and by December, there was a total of six A320 aircraft. This was followed by the introduction of the Airbus A330 into the Dragonair's fleet in July 1995.

A further redistribution of shares took place in April 1996, when China National Aviation Corporation purchased 35.9 per cent of Dragonair and became the largest shareholder, with Cathay Pacific and Swire retaining 25.5 per cent, CITIC Pacific retaining 28.5 percent and the Chao family retaining 5.0 percent. China National Aviation Corporation's holding was further increased to 43 per cent when it was listed on the Hong Kong Stock Exchange on 17 December 1997. On 5 July 1998, Dragonair Flight 841 from Chongqing was the last scheduled arrival at Kai Tak Airport, landed runway 13 at 15:38 GMT (23:38 Hong Kong time).

=== Operational expansion ===
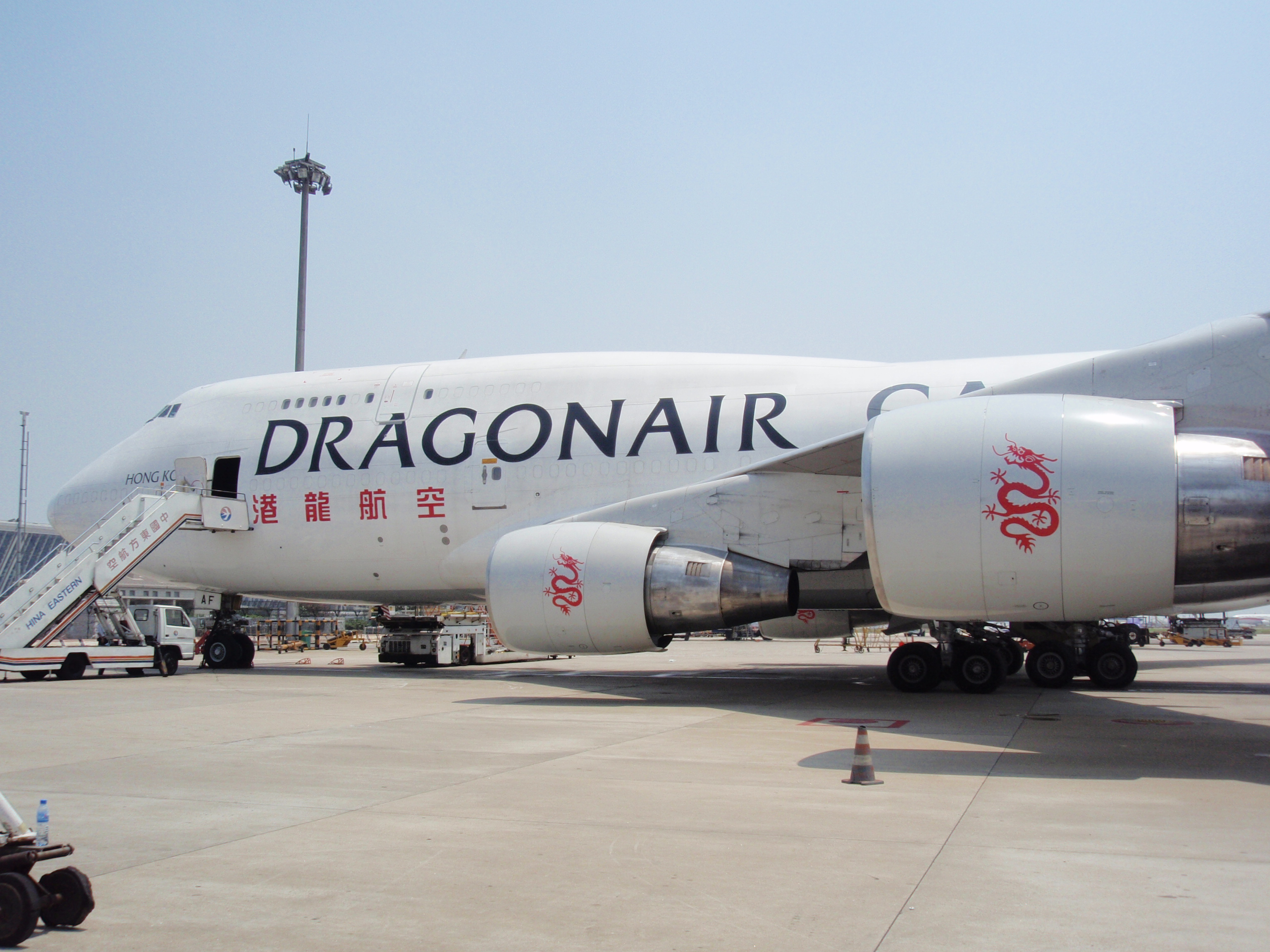
Dragonair Boeing 747-400BCF

In 2000, the airline commenced an all-cargo service to Shanghai, Europe and the Middle East using a leased Boeing 747-200 freighter and a service to Osaka was added in May 2001. The airline purchased two Boeing 747-300 freighters in 2001 and extended freight operations to Xiamen and Taipei in 2002. The airline's net profits rose 60 percent to HK$540 million in 2002, with cargo operations accounting for 30 percent of revenues; and freight volume increasing nearly 50 percent to 20,095 tonnes.

All regular flights were converted to scheduled services in March 2000, with passenger service to Taipei, Bangkok and Tokyo commenced in July 2002, November 2003 and April 2004, respectively. Dragonair Cargo continued to see steady growth and the airline began a Hong Kong–Shanghai freight route on behalf of DHL in June 2003 and leased an Airbus A300 freighter to start a cargo service to Nanjing in June 2004. A second daily European loop to Frankfurt and London, in addition to Manchester and Amsterdam, followed, and by mid 2004, the airline had five Boeing 747 freighters and 26 Airbus passenger aircraft. In a bitter Air Transport Licensing Authority (ATLA) hearings in 2004, Cathay Pacific applied to fly to three mainland cities to which Dragonair filed an objection, saying the move would have an effect on its very survival.

A new passenger service to Sydney was scheduled to open in the second half of 2005, along with Manila and Seoul as the other anticipated destinations. The airline also planned services to the United States in 2005, at first with cargo flights. It was the airline's intention to more than double its freighter fleet to nine Boeing 747s by 2008.

=== Cathay Pacific takeover ===
By 2005, Cathay Pacific owned 18 per cent with its parent, Swire owned 7.71 per cent; China National Aviation Holding owned 43 per cent and CITIC owned 28.5 per cent. The South China Morning Post reported in March 2005 that Swire Pacific was in advanced negotiations that would see Cathay Pacific taking over Dragonair. This was dismissed outright by Tony Tyler, then chief operating officer of Cathay Pacific who said "We have no plans to change that structure right now... we are happy with the structure of the shareholding in Dragonair at the moment." Peter Hilton, transport analyst at Credit Suisse First Boston, said Tyler's remarks were a "cut and dried" dismissal of the takeover talk.

On 28 September 2006, Dragonair became a wholly owned subsidiary of Cathay Pacific after completion of a major shareholding realignment involving Cathay Pacific, Air China, China National Aviation Corporation, CITIC Pacific and Swire Pacific. Cathay Pacific claimed that Dragonair would continue to operate as a separate airline within the Cathay Pacific group, maintaining its own Air Operator's Certificate and with the brand unchanged, with 2,976 employees worldwide. However, the airline would be downsized with five percent of the airline staff retrenched or transferred into Cathay Pacific. No Cathay Pacific staff were to be affected by this announcement.

By 2009, services to Bangkok and Tokyo, and the expansion plans to introduce services to Sydney, Seoul and the United States, had been cancelled and terminated while Cathay took over these routes with immediate effect. In addition, the planned nine-aircraft freight operation had also been eliminated, with three Boeing 747-400BCF freighters transferred to its parent fleet and the remaining two parked at Southern California Logistics Airport in Victorville, California.

On 7 June 2010, Dragonair received its first second-hand Airbus A330-300 from Cathay Pacific to replace their leased A330s.

=== Service integration with Cathay Pacific ===
Dragonair's own loyalty programme, The Elite, that was launched on 12 February 2001, was merged into Cathay Pacific's Marco Polo Club from 1 January 2007. Existing Elite members were offered similar membership by The Marco Polo Club. On 1 August 2007, the airline opened a joint regional office with Cathay Pacific in Beijing, that featured a dedicated area for the airline and its parent, and joined the Oneworld alliance as an affiliated member on 1 November, of which its parent is a founding member. In addition, they opened the first airline-branded arrival lounge, The Arrival, at Hong Kong International Airport on 1 October 2008. The airline's ground handling services subsidiary, Hong Kong International Airport Services Ltd (HIAS), was merged with Hong Kong Airport Services Ltd (HAS) on 1 November 2008 and became a wholly owned subsidiary of Cathay Pacific on 1 December 2008.

In January 2016, Cathay Pacific announced that it was renaming Dragonair to Cathay Dragon. The Cathay Dragon brand became active on 21 November 2016.

=== Demise ===
On 21 October 2020, it was announced by Cathay Pacific that as part of the restructuring due to the COVID-19 pandemic, Cathay Dragon would cease operations with immediate effect. Almost every cabin crew and pilots, along with the vast majority of the staff at the regional subsidiary, were laid off.

== Destinations ==
Before ceasing operations, the airline operated its own aircraft to 47 destinations including 22 destinations in mainland China from its home base Hong Kong.

The destination list shows airports that were served by Cathay Dragon as part of its regular charter and scheduled passenger services at the time of its cessation of operations in October 2020, as well as scheduled services of its former cargo division.

| Country/region | City | Airport | Notes | Refs |
|---|---|---|---|---|
| Bangladesh | Dhaka | Hazrat Shahjalal International Airport | | |
| Cambodia | Phnom Penh | Phnom Penh International Airport | | |
| Cambodia | Siem Reap | Siem Reap International Airport | | |
| China | Beijing | Beijing Capital International Airport | | |
| China | Changsha | Changsha Huanghua International Airport | | |
| China | Chengdu | Chengdu Shuangliu International Airport | | |
| China | Chongqing | Chongqing Jiangbei International Airport | | |
| China | Dalian | Dalian Zhoushuizi International Airport | Terminated | |
| China | Fuzhou | Fuzhou Changle International Airport | | |
| China | Guangzhou | Guangzhou Baiyun International Airport | | |
| China | Guilin | Guilin Liangjiang International Airport | | |
| China | Haikou | Haikou Meilan International Airport | | |
| China | Hangzhou | Hangzhou Xiaoshan International Airport | | |
| China | Jinan | Jinan Yaoqiang International Airport | | |
| China | Kunming | Kunming Changshui International Airport | | |
| China | Nanning | Nanning Wuxu International Airport | | |
| China | Nanjing | Nanjing Lukou International Airport | | |
| China | Ningbo | Ningbo Lishe International Airport | | |
| China | Qingdao | Qingdao Liuting International Airport | | |
| China | Sanya | Sanya Phoenix International Airport | | |
| China | Shanghai | Shanghai Hongqiao International Airport | | |
| China | Shanghai | Shanghai Pudong International Airport | | |
| China | Shenyang | Shenyang Taoxian International Airport | Terminated | |
| China | Tianjin | Tianjin Binhai International Airport | Terminated | |
| China | Wenzhou | Wenzhou Yongqiang International Airport | | |
| China | Wuhan | Wuhan Tianhe International Airport | | |
| China | Xiamen | Xiamen Gaoqi International Airport | | |
| China | Xi'an | Xi'an Xianyang International Airport | | |
| China | Zhengzhou | Zhengzhou Xinzheng International Airport | | |
| Germany | Frankfurt | Frankfurt Airport ^{Cargo} | Terminated | |
| Hong Kong | Hong Kong | Hong Kong International Airport | Hub | |
| India | Bengaluru | Kempegowda International Airport | | |
| India | Kolkata | Netaji Subhas Chandra Bose International Airport | | |
| Indonesia | Denpasar | Ngurah Rai International Airport | | |
| Indonesia | Medan | Kualanamu International Airport | | |
| Japan | Fukuoka | Fukuoka Airport | | |
| Japan | Hiroshima | Hiroshima Airport | Terminated | |
| Japan | Komatsu | Komatsu Airport | Charter | |
| Japan | Naha | Naha Airport | | |
| Japan | Niigata | Niigata Airport | Seasonal | |
| Japan | Osaka | Kansai International Airport ^{Cargo} | Terminated | |
| Japan | Sendai | Sendai Airport ^{Charter} | Terminated | |
| Japan | Tokushima | Tokushima Airport | Seasonal | |
| Japan | Tokyo | Haneda Airport | | |
| Japan | Tokyo | Narita International Airport | Terminated | |
| Malaysia | Kota Kinabalu | Kota Kinabalu International Airport | Terminated | |
| Malaysia | Kuala Lumpur | Kuala Lumpur International Airport | | |
| Malaysia | Kuching | Kuching International Airport | Terminated | |
| Malaysia | Penang | Penang International Airport | | |
| Myanmar | Yangon | Yangon International Airport | | |
| Nepal | Kathmandu | Tribhuvan International Airport | Terminated | |
| Netherlands | Amsterdam | Amsterdam Airport Schiphol ^{Cargo} | Terminated | |
| Philippines | Clark | Clark International Airport | | |
| Philippines | Davao | Francisco Bangoy International Airport | | |
| Philippines | Manila | Ninoy Aquino International Airport | Terminated | |
| South Korea | Busan | Gimhae International Airport | | |
| South Korea | Jeju | Jeju International Airport | | |
| Taiwan | Kaohsiung | Kaohsiung International Airport | | |
| Taiwan | Taichung | Taichung International Airport | | |
| Taiwan | Taipei | Taoyuan International Airport | | |
| Thailand | Bangkok | Don Mueang International Airport | Terminated | |
| Thailand | Chiang Mai | Chiang Mai International Airport | | |
| Thailand | Phuket | Phuket International Airport | | |
| United Arab Emirates | Dubai | Dubai International Airport ^{Cargo} | Terminated | |
| United Kingdom | London | London Stansted Airport ^{Cargo} | Terminated | |
| United Kingdom | Manchester | Manchester Airport ^{Cargo} | Terminated | |
| United States | New York City | John F. Kennedy International Airport ^{Cargo} | Terminated | |
| Vietnam | Da Nang | Da Nang International Airport | | |
| Vietnam | Hanoi | Noi Bai International Airport | | |

== Codeshare agreements ==
Cathay Dragon had codeshare agreements with the following partner airlines:

- Air Canada
- Air China
- American Airlines
- Bangkok Airways
- Cathay Pacific
- Finnair
- Malaysia Airlines
- Qantas
- S7 Airlines
- Shenzhen Airlines

== Final fleet ==
=== Pre-merger fleet ===
Cathay Dragon operated an all–Airbus fleet in a mix of single-aisle and twin-aisle aircraft. The fleet consisted of the following aircraft prior to folding into Cathay Pacific:

Cathay Dragon fleet
| Aircraft | In service | Orders | Passengers | | | | Notes |
| Aircraft | In service | Orders | F | J | Y | Total | Notes |
|---|---|---|---|---|---|---|---|
| Airbus A320-200 | 10 | — | — | 8 | 156 | 164 | All aircraft were retired after the cessation of operations. 3 aircraft were transferred to the parent airline and were later retransferred to HK Express. 8 aircraft were stored at Alice Springs amid the COVID-19 pandemic. Were meant to be replaced by Airbus A321neo. |
| Airbus A321-200 | 7 | — | — | 24 | 148 | 172 | 3 aircraft were retired after the cessation of operations. 5 aircraft were transferred to the parent airline, in which 2 were later retransferred to HK Express. 3 aircraft were stored at Alice Springs amid the COVID-19 pandemic. Were meant to be replaced by Airbus A321neo. |
| Airbus A321neo | — | 16 | — | 12 | 190 | 202 | Original order was for 32 aircraft in 2018, but was cut by half in 2019 following Cathay Pacific's acquisition of HK Express. Remaining orders transferred to the parent airline and deliveries began in November 2020. Were meant to replace Airbus A320-200 and Airbus A321-200. |
| Airbus A330-300 | 18 | 2 | 8 | 42 | 230 | 280 | All aircraft have been returned or transferred to the parent airline. |
| Airbus A330-300 | 18 | 2 | — | 42 | 265 | 307 | All aircraft have been returned or transferred to the parent airline. |
| Airbus A330-300 | 18 | 2 | — | 24 | 293 | 317 | All aircraft have been returned or transferred to the parent airline. |
| Total | 35 | 18 | | | | | |

=== Former fleet ===
Cathay Dragon retired fleet
| Aircraft | Total | Year introduced | Year Retired | Notes |
|---|---|---|---|---|
| Airbus A300B4-200F | Unknown | Unknown | Unknown | |
| Airbus A320-200 | 18 | 1993 | 2020 | Older batch of aircraft were retired before 2020. |
| Airbus A321-200 | 1 | 1999 | 2020 | |
| Airbus A330-300 | 21 | 1995 | 2020 | Older batch of aircraft were retired before 2020. Includes the world's first A330-300 (B-HLJ). 6 aircraft transferred from Cathay Pacific. |
| Boeing 737–200 | 6 | 1985 | 1993 | |
| Boeing 747-200F | 1 | 2001 | 2009 | |
| Boeing 747-300SF | 3 | 2001 | 2010 | |
| Boeing 747-400BCF | 4 | 2006 | 2010 | Freighters of Cathay Pacific. |
| Lockheed L-1011 TriStar | 1 | 1990 | 1995 | |
| Lockheed L-1011 TriStar | 2 | 1990 | 1995 | Leased from Cathay Pacific. |

== Livery ==
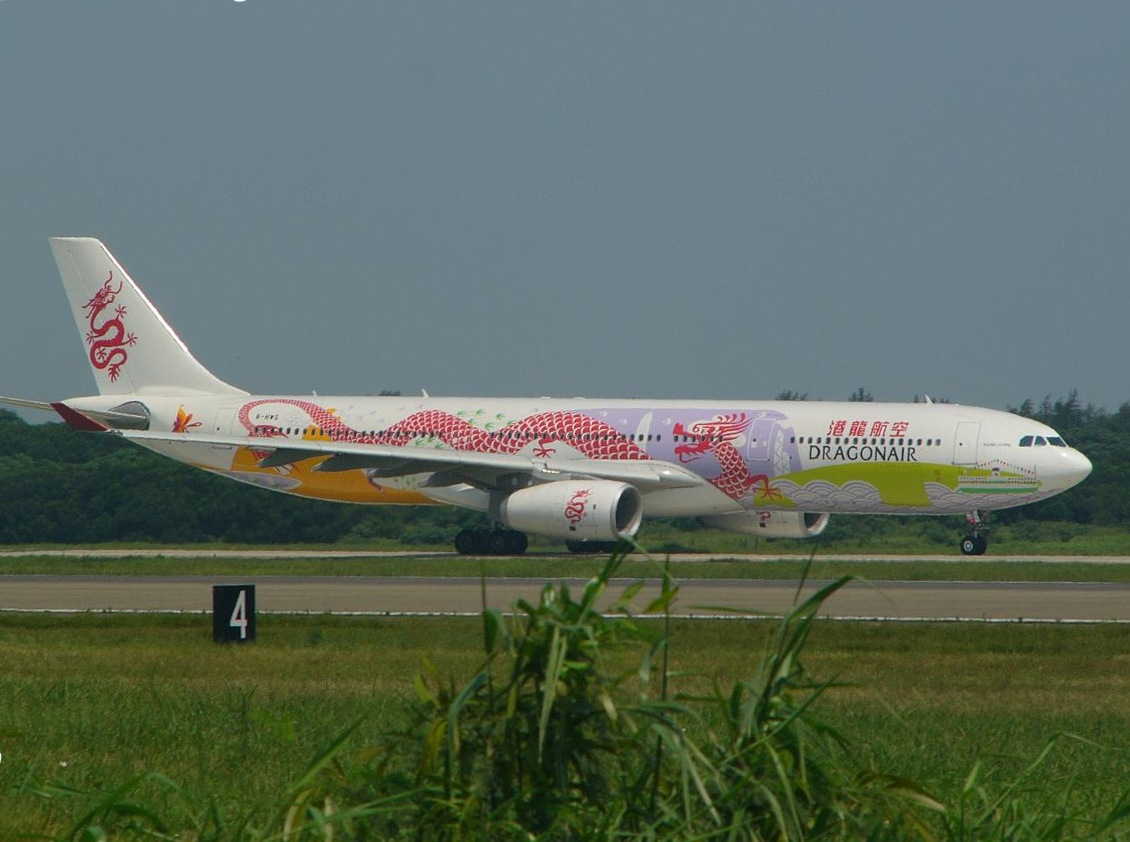
Airbus A330-300 in special 20th Anniversary livery at Taipei Taoyuan International Airport

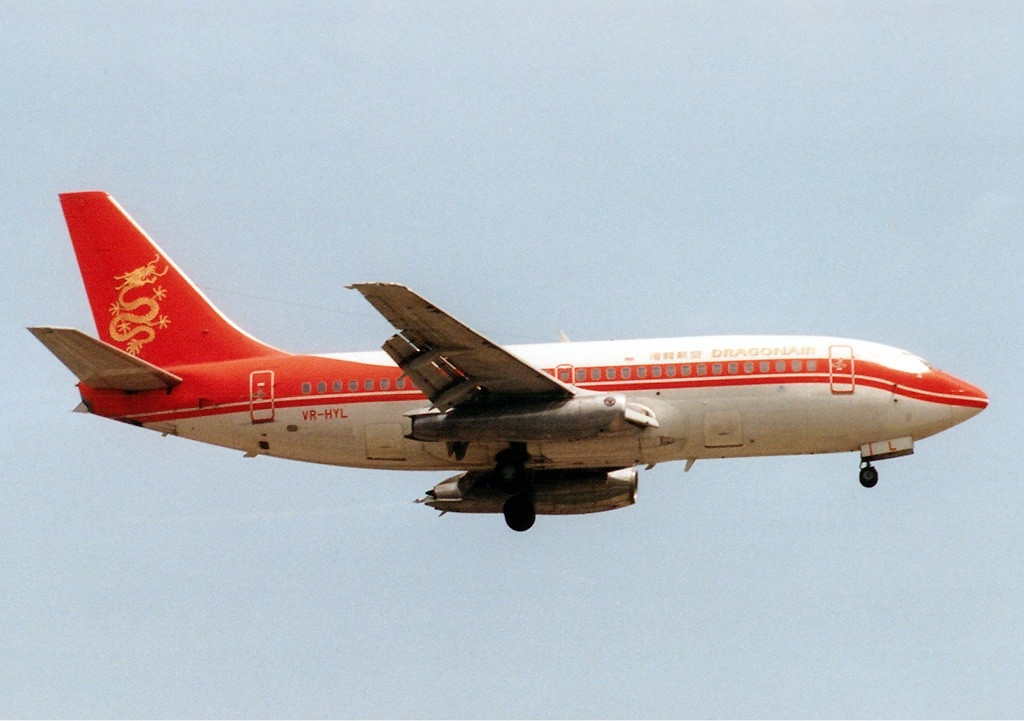
Boeing 737-200 on final approach at Kai Tak Airport in original livery

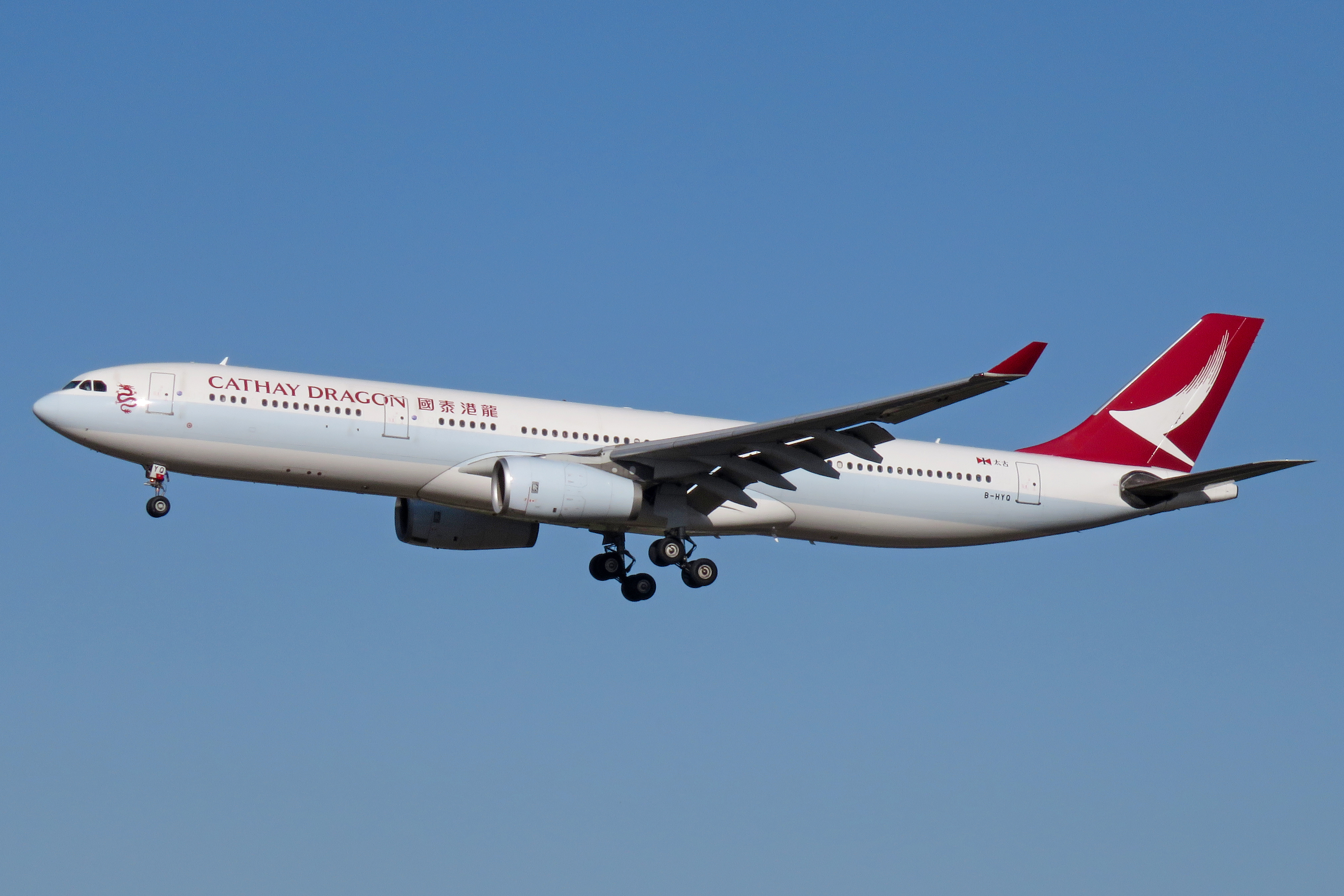
Airbus A330-300 wearing the new livery released in 2016

The airline's original livery consists of a thick red-coloured horizontal strip along a white-coloured fuselage with a red-coloured vertical stabiliser. The airline's traditional Chinese and English name and its logo are in gold colour and are painted on the forward fuselage above the red horizontal strip and on the vertical stabiliser, respectively.

The previous livery is in white colour with a red dragon on the cowling and on the vertical stabiliser; and the airline's name written in Chinese red lettering and in English black lettering above and below the front passenger windows, respectively. In addition, there is a 30 cm Oneworld logo next to the first left door and a Swire logo on the aft of the aircraft.

On 5 May 2005, Dragonair celebrated its 20th anniversary with a new Airbus A330-300 (B-HWG) painted in a special livery. The work of art took 14 months to create, from design tender to completed image. The special livery featured a waterside view with a junk and fishes leaping out of the water at the front of the aircraft; a red dragon spread across the fuselage in the daylight; and children playing with traditional Chinese lanterns by the waterside of an ancient village on the left side of the aircraft, representing the past. It also featured a waterside view with a Star Ferry at front of the aircraft; and a red dragon spread across the fuselage in the Hong Kong night sky, representing the present. Stanley Hui, Dragonair's CEO at the time, described the special livery "embodies the spirit of the Chinese dragons of old – a spirit that aspires to excellence". The aircraft was removed from service in February 2013, at the expiration of its lease.

On 1 June 2010, Dragonair celebrated its 25th anniversary, with a special livery painted on an Airbus A330-300 (B-HYF). The livery also bears the slogan, "Serving you for 25 years" on the right side on the aircraft, and its Chinese slogan is on the left side of the aircraft. It also has a golden dragon spreading across the fuselage along with several grey Chinese letters on it. It was repainted to the standard livery in March 2014.

In 2016, Cathay Pacific, Dragonair's parent company, announced that they would be re-branding Dragonair to Cathay Dragon. It now uses the logo of its parent company, using light maroon color. For this change, a new hybrid livery has been adopted. The new livery is similar to Cathay Pacific's new livery in the tail logo and font. The major difference is instead of the Cathay Pacific green theme, it has a light maroon theme. The titles reads "Cathay Dragon" along with Chinese lettering reading the name. The airline's previous logo has been retained and appears next to the cockpit windows. The new livery first appeared on an Airbus A330-300 (B-HYQ). An Airbus A330-300 (B-HLJ) was the last remaining aircraft that had the Dragonair livery until it was retired in July 2020.

On 1 June 2017, In the celebration of the 20th year of the establishment of the HKSAR government, Cathay Dragon received its special The Spirit of Hong Kong livery. It is painted on an Airbus A330-300 (B-HYB), and it is the sister aircraft to Cathay Pacific's Boeing 777-300 (B-HNK), and was retired on 24 September 2020, after its last flight from Shanghai to Hong Kong as KA877.

== Loyalty programmes ==
Cathay Dragon shared two loyalty programmes with its parent company, Cathay Pacific: The Marco Polo Club (The Club), a loyalty programme, and Asia Miles, a travel reward programme. Members of The Club are automatically enrolled as Asia Miles members.

== Services ==
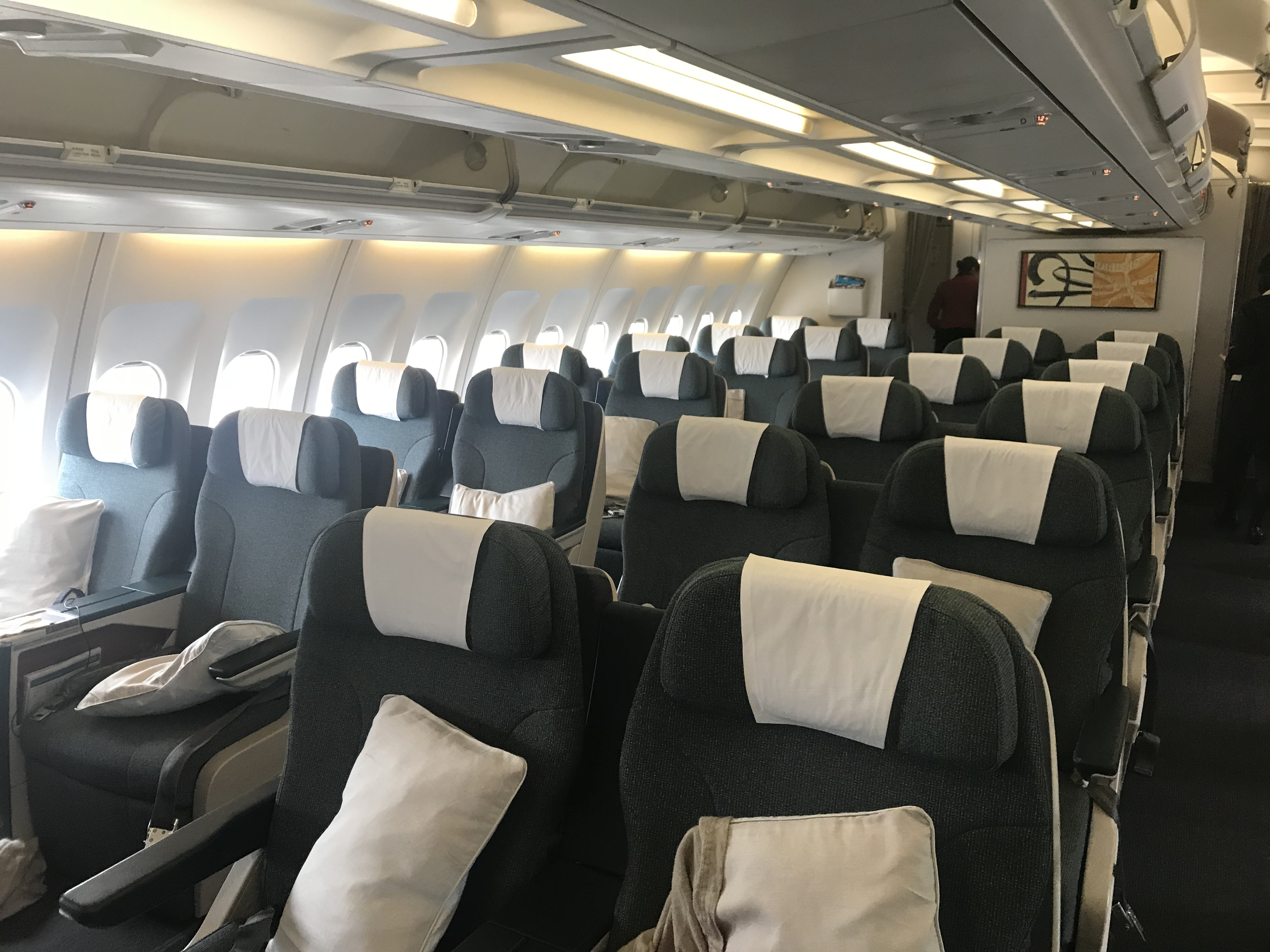
Cathay Dragon business class cabin

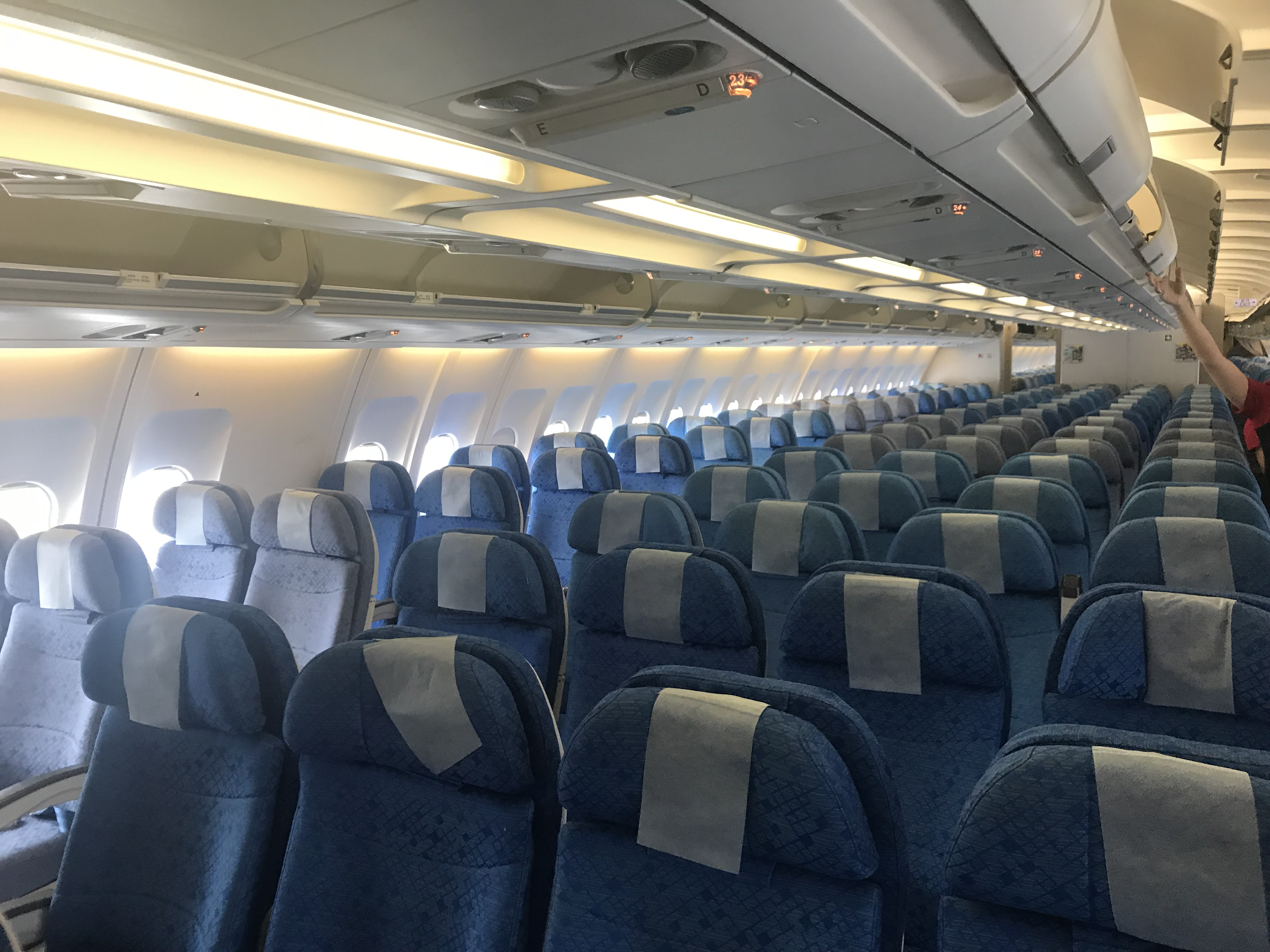
Cathay Dragon economy class cabin

Food and beverages served on flights from Hong Kong were provided by LSG Lufthansa Services Hong Kong Ltd, a Cathay Dragon associate. A variety of regional dishes, such as dim sum, Fokkien fried rice, barbecue pork with fried rice and chicken with Thai sweet chili, was served on flights into mainland China. However, only beverages and pastries were served in Economy Class for flights between Hong Kong and Changsha, Clark, Guangzhou, Haikou and Sanya.

In addition, the airline provided a range of different newspapers and magazines from around the world, including the airline's in-flight magazine Emporium. Beginning in March 2013, the majority of the airline's fleet was retrofitted with new Business and Economy Class seats. The seats are nearly identical to the new Regional Business Class and new Long-haul Economy Class products offered by parent company Cathay Pacific. The new design features a Cathay Pacific-like ambience infused with traditional Chinese art designs. Seats in both classes will be fitted with StudioKA (a rebranded version of the StudioCX inflight entertainment system on board Cathay Pacific aircraft), which features a 12.1-inch (Business Class) or 9-inch (Economy Class) touchscreen display, a multipurpose controller Audio/Video on Demand (AVOD), support for iOS devices, and a USB port for connectivity to other devices. Worldwide in-seat power outlets will be available to all passengers. The new Business Class features a 21-inch wide recliner seat with 45 inches (narrowbody aircraft) or 47 inches (widebody aircraft) of pitch, while the new Economy Class will be 18.1 inches wide with 30 inches (narrowbody aircraft) or 32 inches (widebody aircraft) of pitch. The retrofitting process is completed by the end of 2014.

=== Awards ===
Awards received by Cathay Dragon

| Year | Organisation | Award |
|---|---|---|
| 2002 | Skytrax World Airlines Awards | Best Airline China |
| 2003 | Skytrax World Airlines Awards | Best Airline China |
| 2004 | Skytrax World Airlines Awards | Best Airline China |
| 2005 | Business Traveller Asia-Pacific | Best China Airline |
| 2005 | Business Traveller China | Best Airline Economy Class |
| 2005 | Skytrax World Airlines Awards | Best Airline China |
| 2006 | Business Traveller Asia-Pacific | Best China Airline |
| 2006 | Business Traveller China | Best Airline Economy Class |
| 2007 | Skytrax World Airlines Awards | Best Airline China |
| 2007 | World Travel Awards | Top Airline for Potential Value |
| 2008 | Skytrax World Airlines Awards | Best Regional Airline – Southeast Asia |
| 2010 | Skytrax World Airlines Awards | Best Regional Airline |
| 2010 | TTG Travel | Best Regional Airline |
| 2010 | Yazhou Zhoukan | Asian Excellence Brand |
| 2011 | Skytrax World Airlines Awards | Best Regional Airline |
| 2011 | Skytrax World Airlines Awards | Best Regional Airline – Asia |
| 2012 | TTG Travel | Best Regional Airline |
| 2013 | Skytrax World Airlines Awards | Best Regional Airline |
| 2013 | Skytrax World Airlines Awards | Best Regional Airline – Asia |
| 2013 | TTG Travel | Best Regional Airline |
| 2013 | Business Traveller China | Best Airline Economy Class |
| 2014 | TTG Travel | Best Regional Airline |
| 2014 | Business Traveller China | Best Airline Economy Class |
| 2015 | Business Traveller China | Best Airline Economy Class |
| 2015 | TTG Travel | Best Regional Airline |
| 2015 | Skytrax World Airlines Awards | Best Regional Airline |
| 2015 | Skytrax World Airlines Awards | Best Regional Airline – Asia |
| 2016 | Business Traveller China | Best Airline Economy Class |

== Subsidiaries and associates ==
Since its founding in 1985, the airline has been investing into airline-related servicing companies, including inflight catering, ground handling and service equipment companies.

The following are Cathay Dragon's major subsidiaries and associates: (as of 23 December 2016)

- LSG Lufthansa Service Hong Kong Ltd – 31.94% owned
- Dah-Chong Hong-Dragonair Airport GSE Service Ltd (DAS) – 30%
- HAS GSE Solutions Ltd – 30%

=== Hong Kong Airport Services Ltd ===
Hong Kong Airport Services Ltd (HAS), a former wholly owned subsidiary, provides ground handling services to the airline at Hong Kong International Airport. Their services include airside/landside operations, airport lounge, baggage services, cargo services, ramp services, ticketing & Information, station control and flight operations. On 1 November 2008, HIAS was integrated into Hong Kong Airport Services Ltd (HAS), a joint venture between Dragonair and Cathay Pacific, to become one of the Asia's largest airport services providers. On 1 December 2008, HAS became a wholly owned subsidiary of Cathay Pacific.

== See also ==
- List of airlines of Hong Kong
- List of airports in Hong Kong
- List of companies of Hong Kong
- Transport in Hong Kong
