= Cathay Pacific fleet =

Aircraft operated by Cathay Pacific

Cathay Pacific is the flag carrier airline of Hong Kong. It operates a passenger fleet of 180 aircraft which is composed of narrow-body and wide-body aircraft, with passenger fleet numbers of 17 Airbus A321neo, 43 Airbus A330-300, 30 Airbus A350-900, 18 A350-1000, 17 Boeing 777-300 & 35 Boeing 777-300er, as well as a freighter fleet of 20 Boeing 747 freighters. The airline also has orders to add 16 Airbus A321neo, 41 Airbus A330-900, 8 Airbus A350F and 35 Boeing 777-9 aircraft to its fleet.

== Current fleet ==
As of December 2025, Cathay Pacific operates the following aircraft:

Cathay Pacific fleet
Aircraft	In service	Orders	Passengers					Notes
Aircraft	In service	Orders	F	J	W	Y	Total	Notes
Airbus A321neo	16	—	—	12	—	190	202	Originally ordered 16 for Cathay Dragon. To be reconfigured with fewer Economy seats and increased legroom. Deliveries until 2029.
Airbus A321neo	1	13	—	12	—	183	195	Equipped with new Economy seats and increased legroom.
Airbus A330-300	43	—	—	39	21	191	251	Largest operator. To be refurbished with new Aria Studio and Economy seats. Older aircraft to be retired and replaced by the A330-900s.
Airbus A330-300	43	—	—	39	—	223	262	Largest operator. To be refurbished with new Aria Studio and Economy seats. Older aircraft to be retired and replaced by the A330-900s.
Airbus A330-300	43	—	—	28	—	265	293	Largest operator. To be refurbished with new Aria Studio and Economy seats. Older aircraft to be retired and replaced by the A330-900s.
Airbus A330-300	43	—	—	42	—	265	307	Largest operator. To be refurbished with new Aria Studio and Economy seats. Older aircraft to be retired and replaced by the A330-900s.
Airbus A330-300	43	—	—	24	—	293	317	Largest operator. To be refurbished with new Aria Studio and Economy seats. Older aircraft to be retired and replaced by the A330-900s.
Airbus A330-300	43	—	—	50	—	230	280	Largest operator. To be refurbished with new Aria Studio and Economy seats. Older aircraft to be retired and replaced by the A330-900s.
Airbus A330-900	—	41	TBA					Order with 30 options. Deliveries from 2028. Replacing older A330-300s.
Airbus A350-900	30	—	—	38	28	214	280	
Airbus A350-1000	18	—	—	46	32	256	334	
Boeing 777-300	17	—	—	42	—	396	438	Launch customer and largest operator.
Boeing 777-300ER	7	—	6	53	34	201	294	To be refurbished with new Aria Suites and Premium Economy.
Boeing 777-300ER	9	—	—	40	32	296	368	To be refurbished with new Aria Suites and Premium Economy.
Boeing 777-300ER	19	—	—	45	48	268	361	Equipped with new Aria Suites and Premium Economy.
Boeing 777-9	—	35	TBA					Order with 7 options. Deliveries from 2027.
Cathay Cargo fleet
Airbus A350F	—	8	Cargo					Order with 20 options. Deliveries from 2027. Replacing Boeing 747-400ERF.
Boeing 747-400ERF	6	—	Cargo					To be retired and replaced by Airbus A350F.
Boeing 747-8F	14	—	Cargo					
Total	180	97						

Airbus A321neo

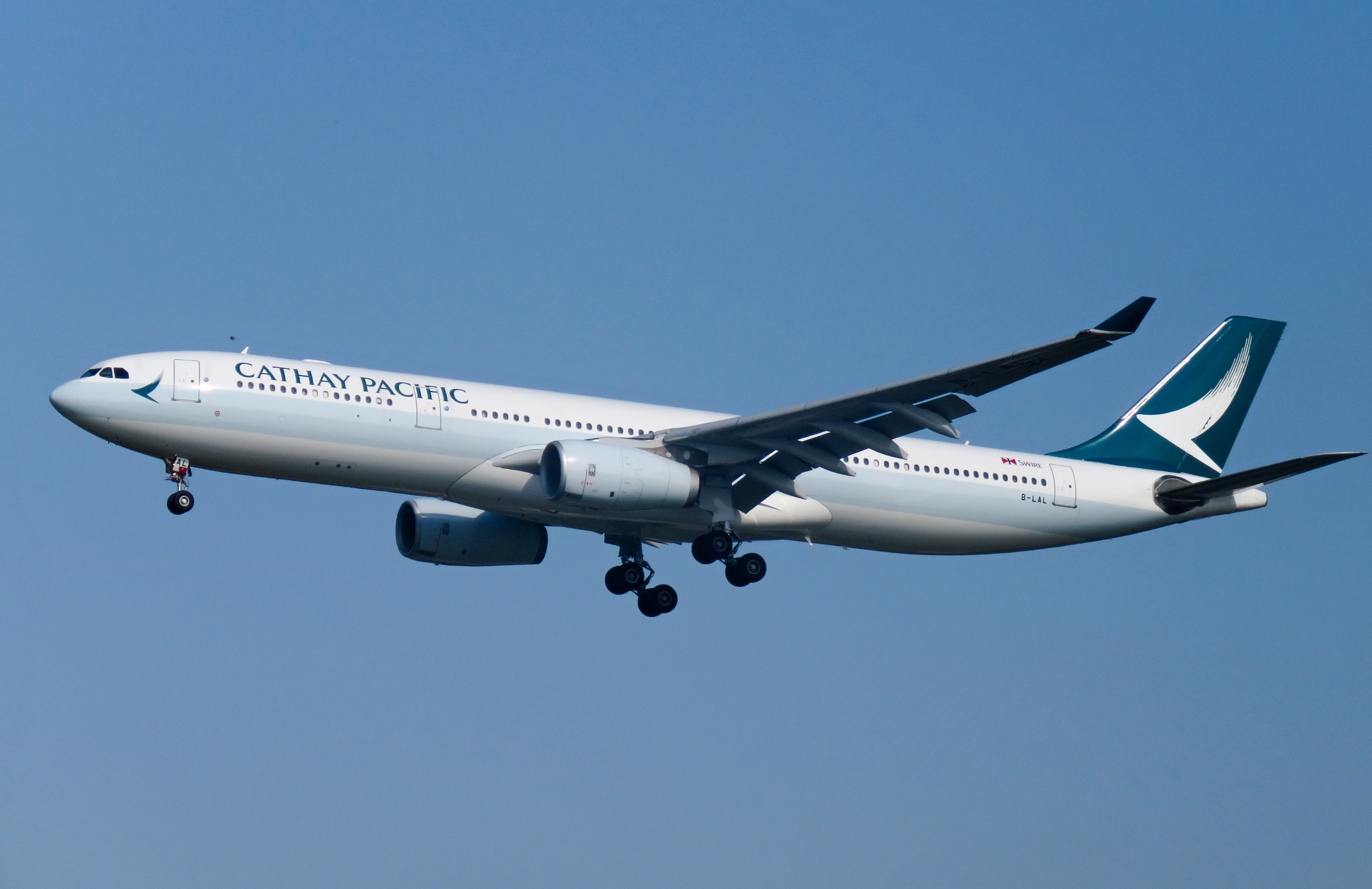
Airbus A330-300

Airbus A350-900

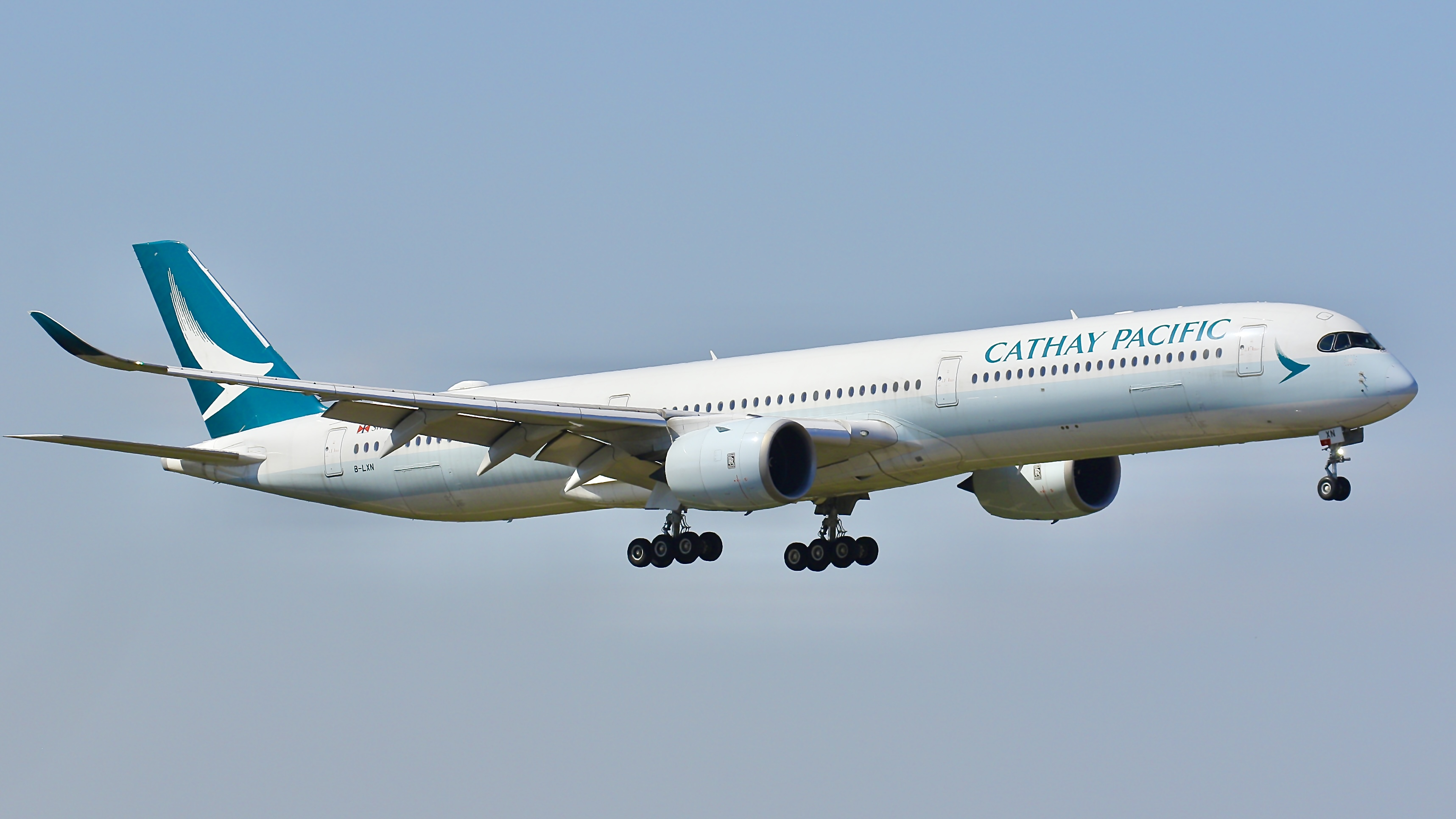
Airbus A350-1000

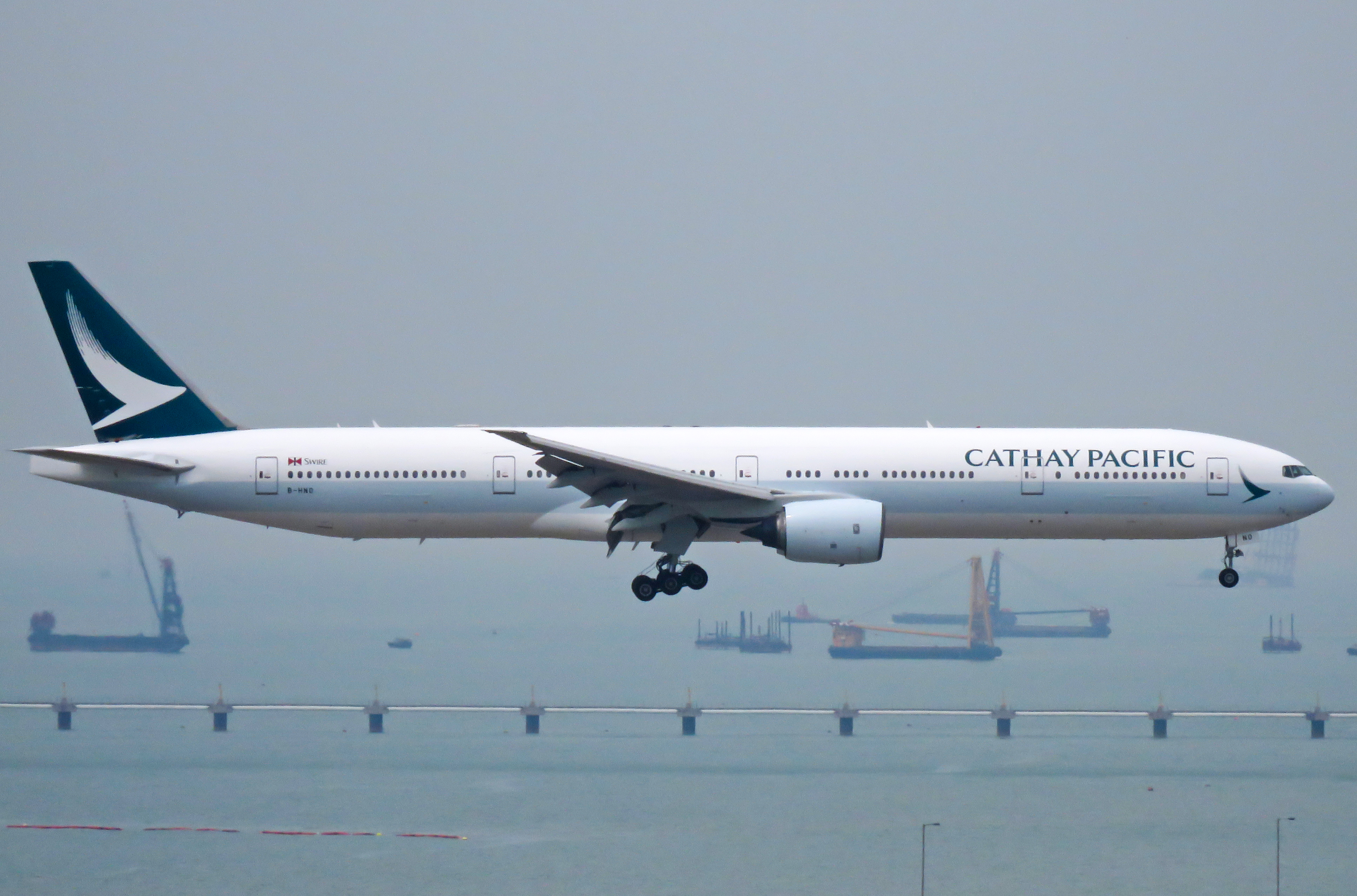
Boeing 777-300

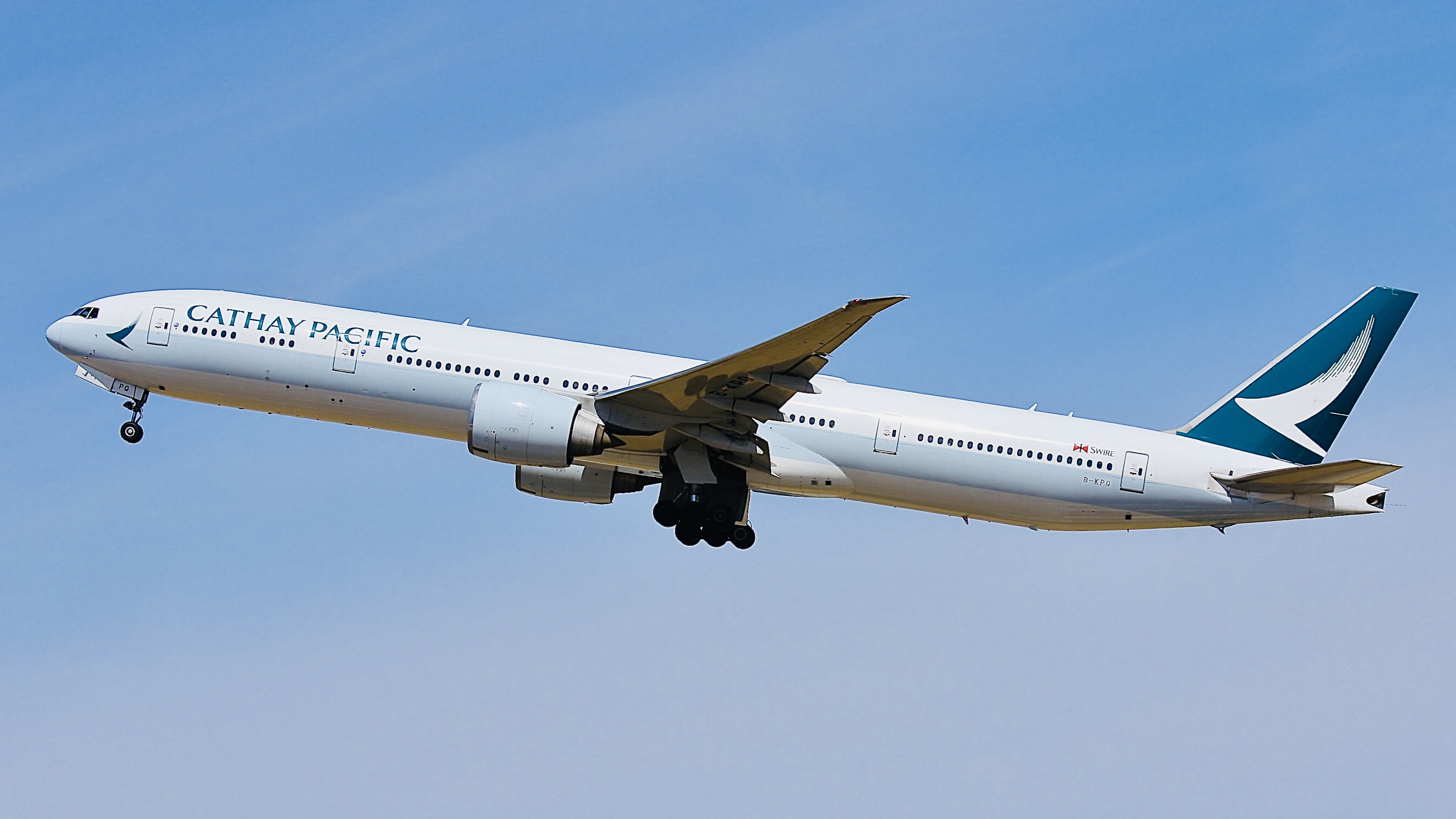
Boeing 777-300ER

Boeing 747-400ERF

Boeing 747-8F

== Special liveries ==
Former Cathay Pacific special liveries

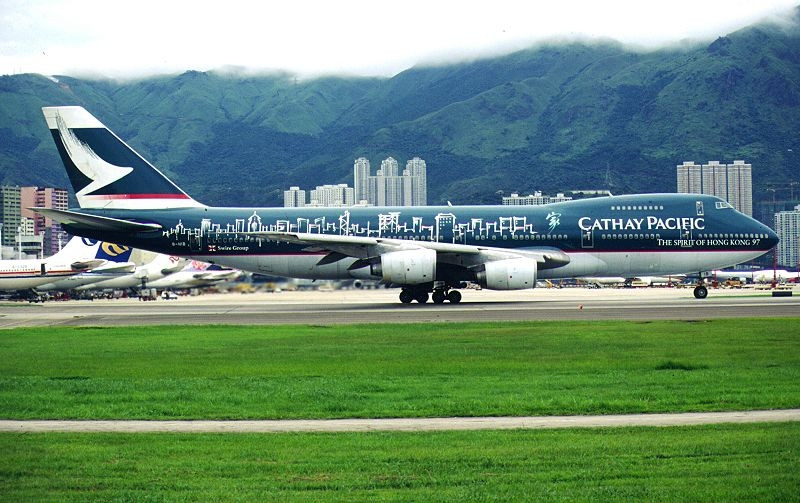
A Boeing 747-267B (B-HIB) in The Spirit of Hong Kong 97 special livery

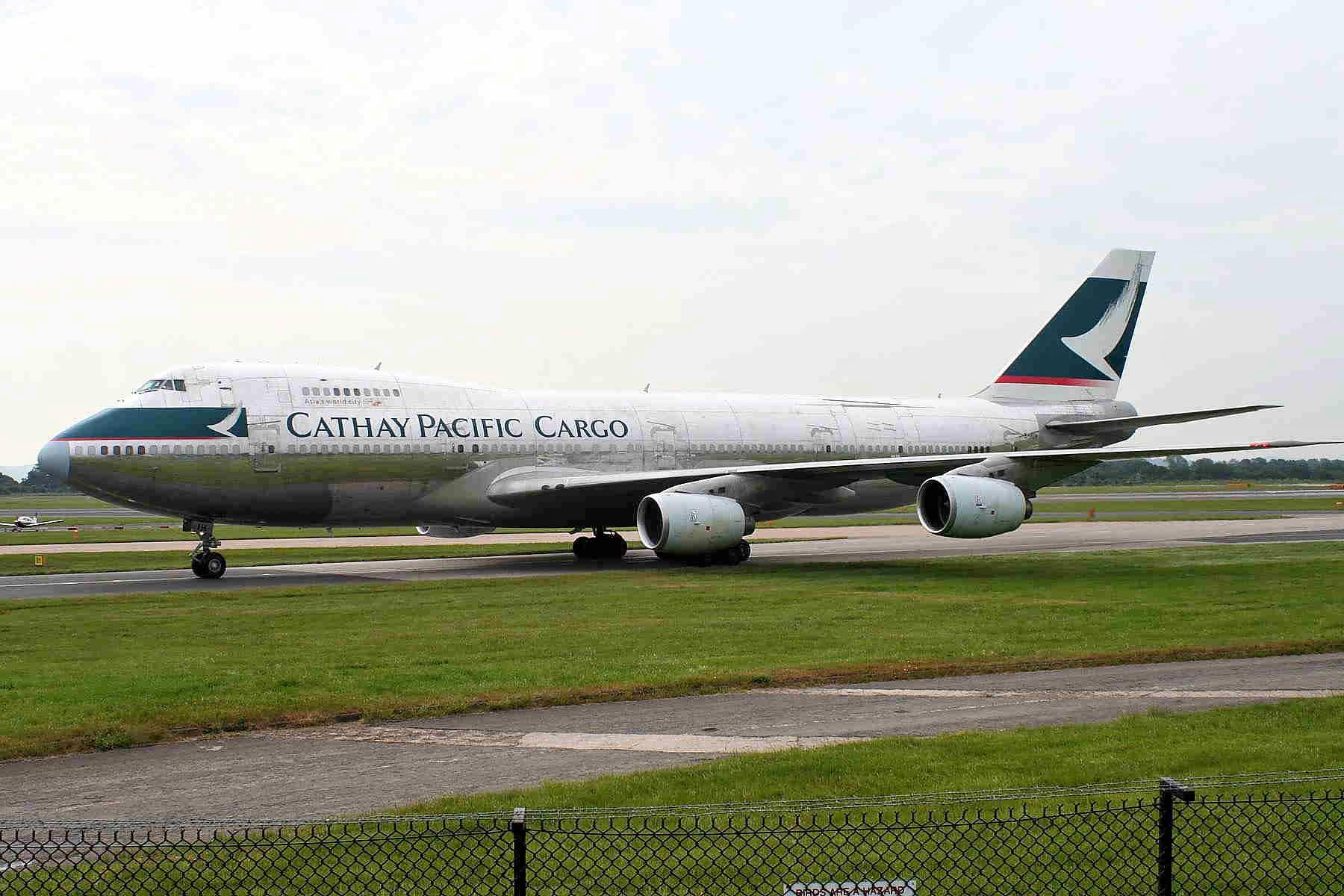
A Boeing 747-267B(F) (B-HIH) in Silver Bullet special livery

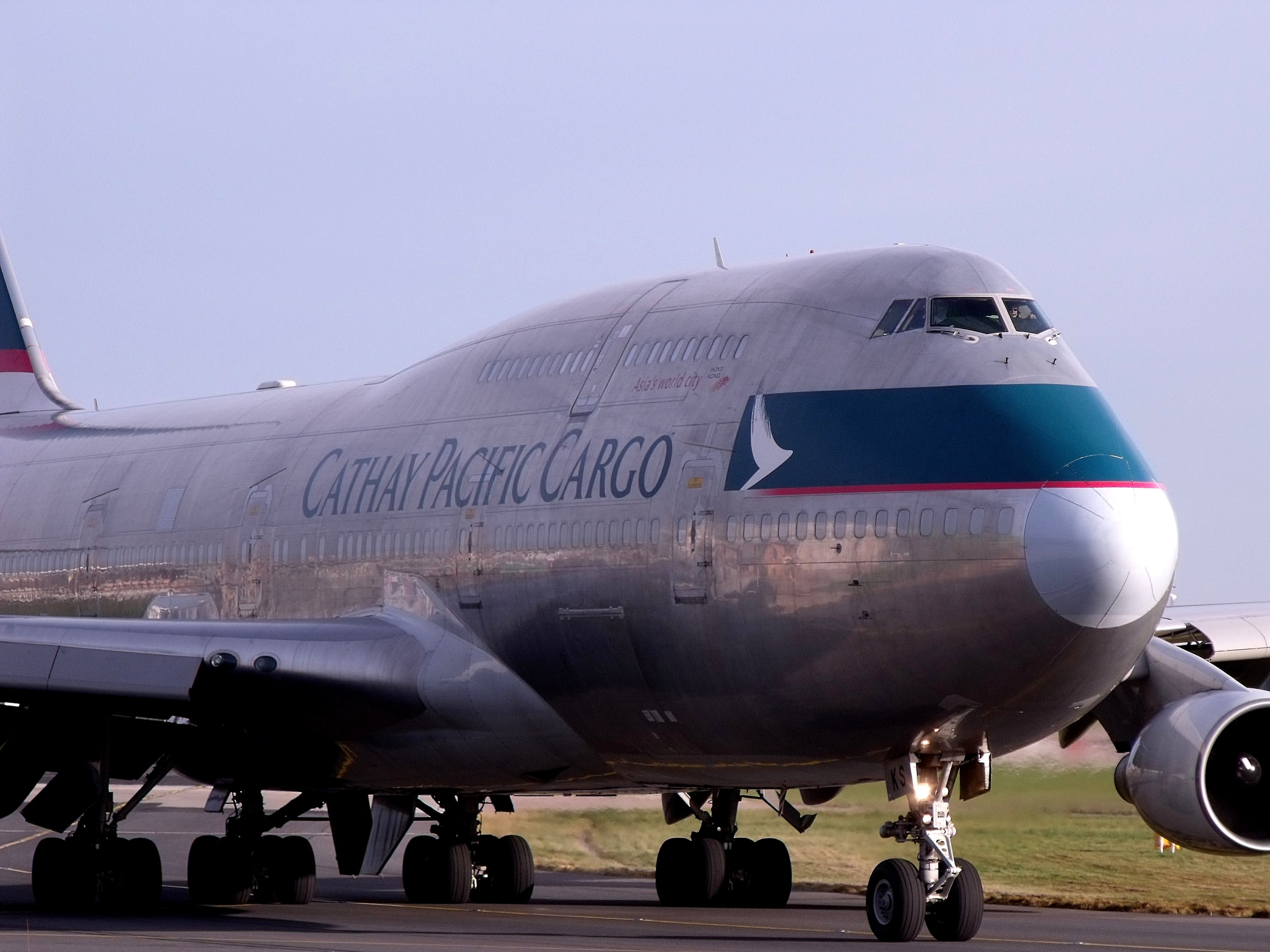
A Boeing 747-412(BCF) (B-HKS) in Silver Bullet special livery

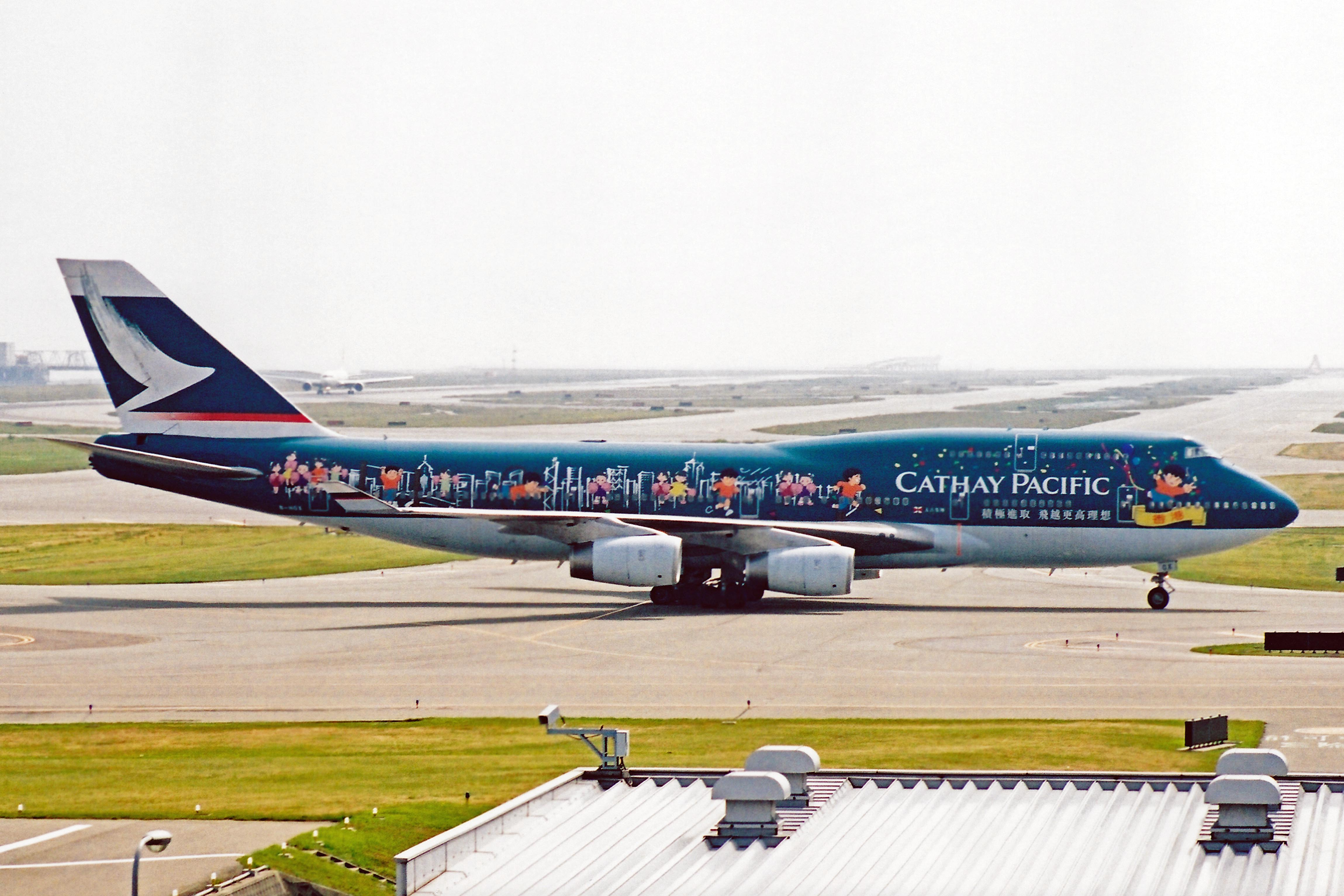
A Boeing 747-400 (B-HOX) in The Spirit of Hong Kong Millenium special livery

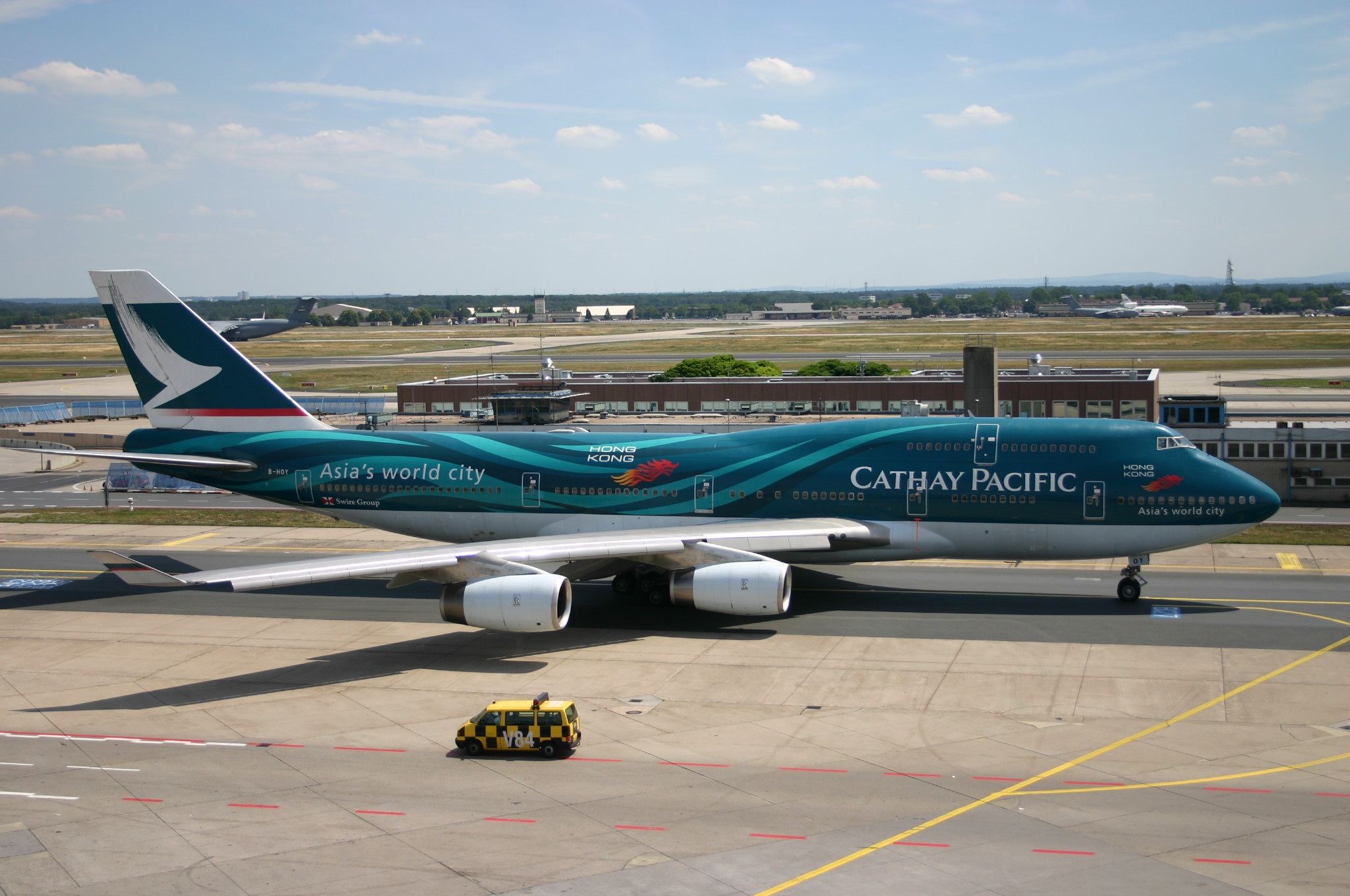
A Boeing 747-400 (B-HOY) in Asia's World City special livery

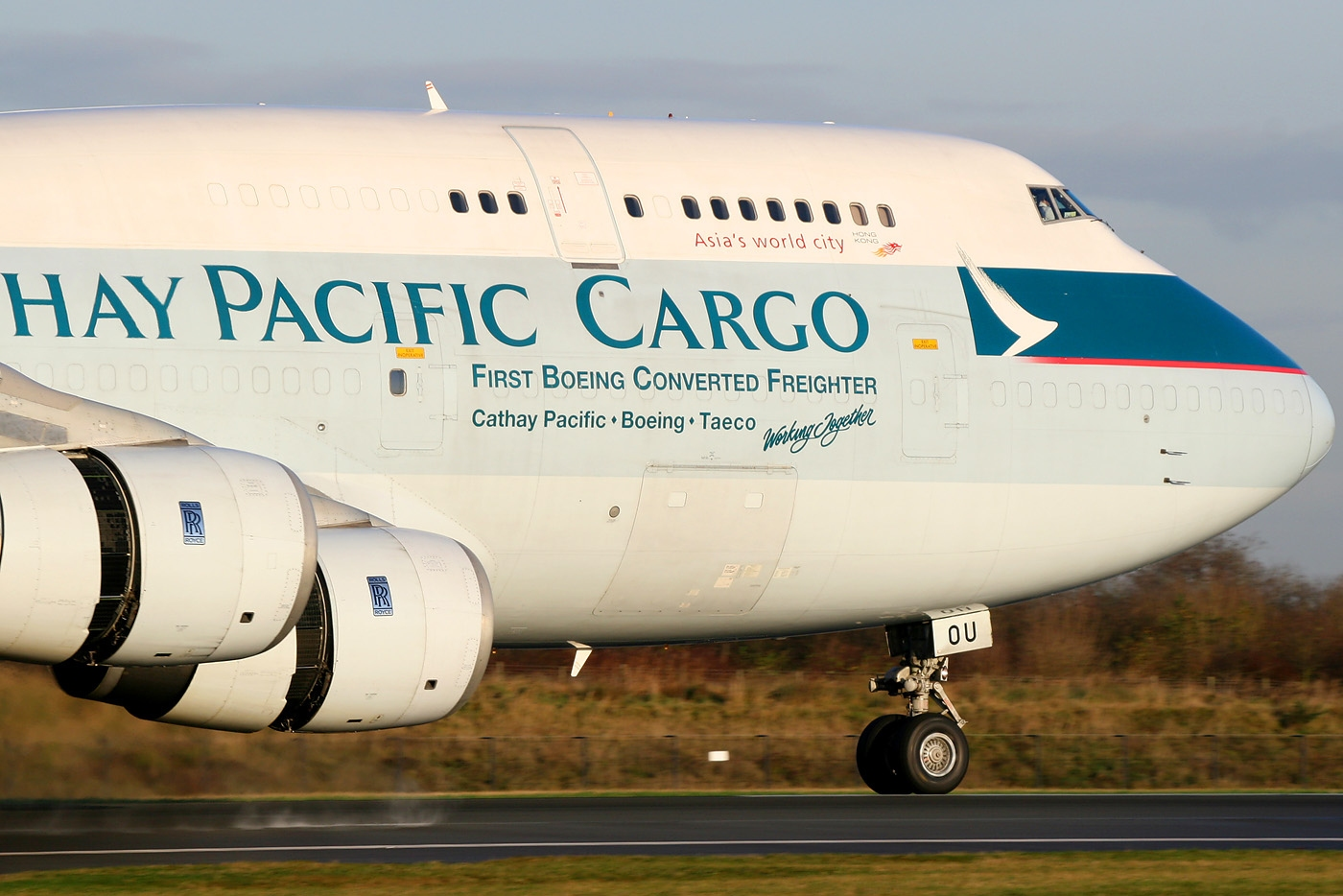
A Boeing 747-467(BCF) (B-HOU) in First Boeing Converted Freighter special livery

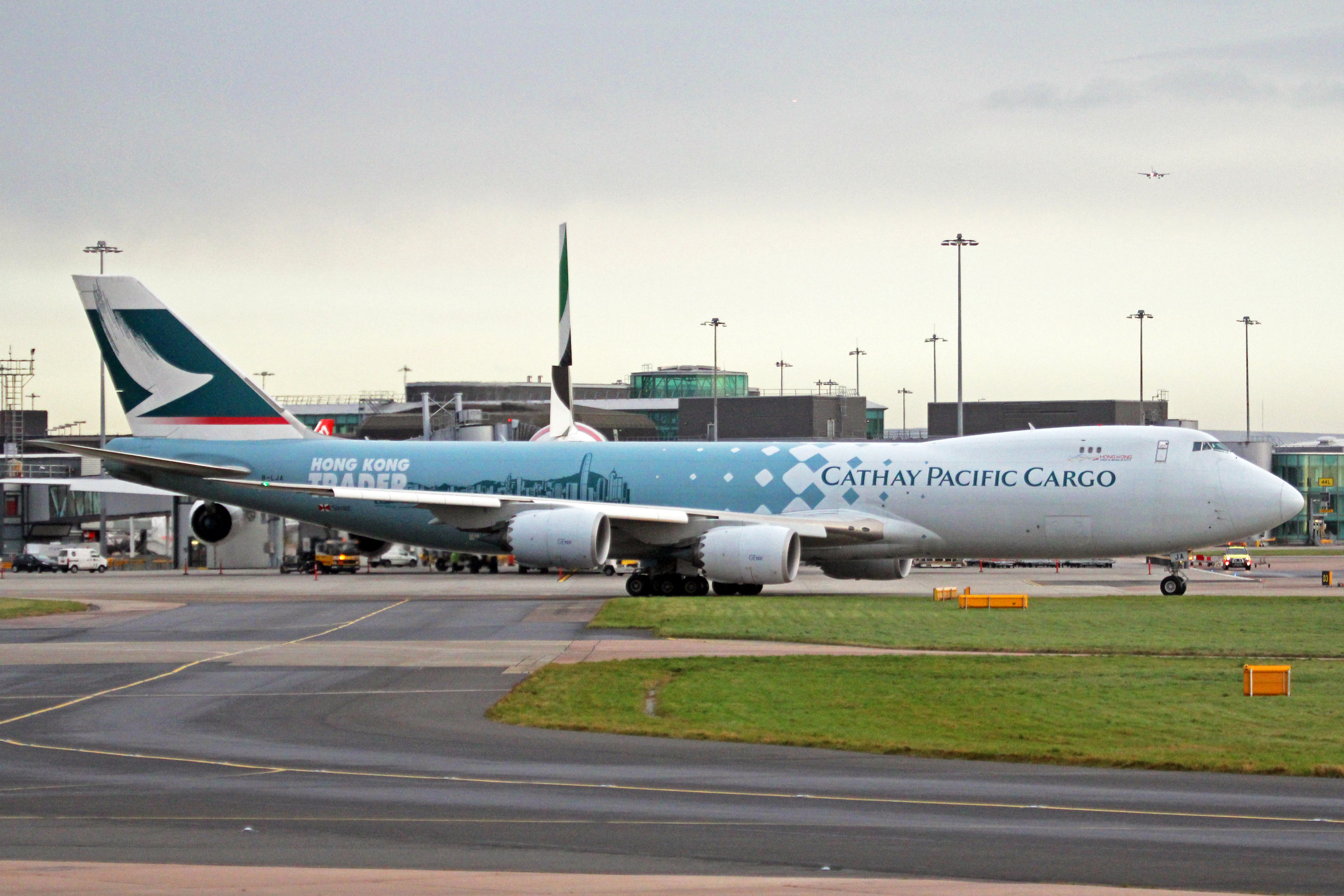
A Boeing 747-8F (B-LJA) in Hong Kong trader livery

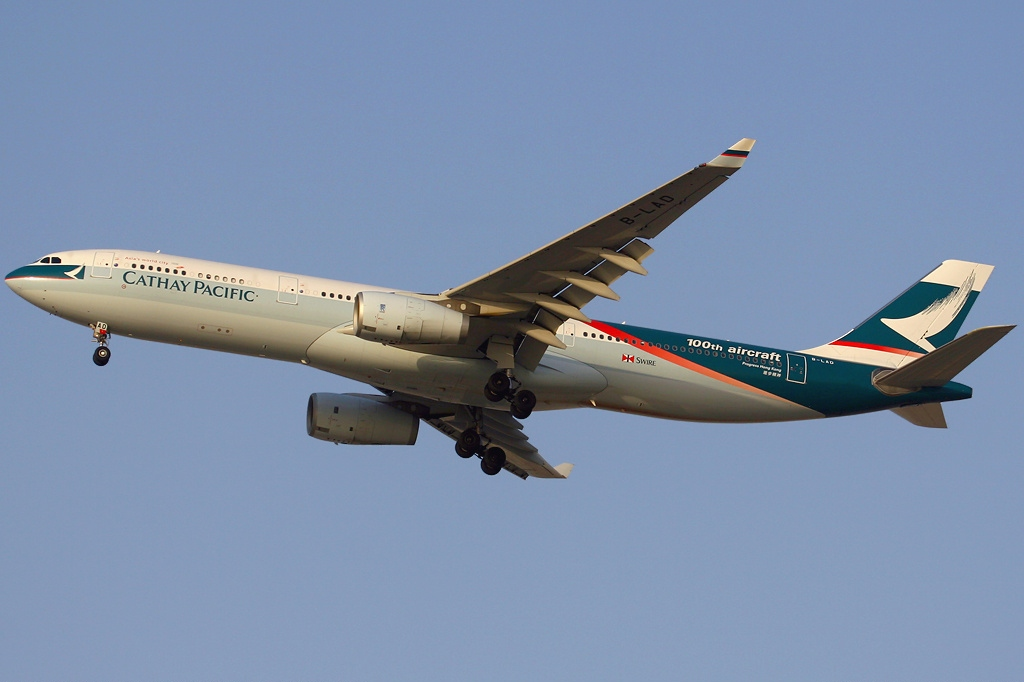
An Airbus A330-343 (B-LAD) in 100th aircraft livery

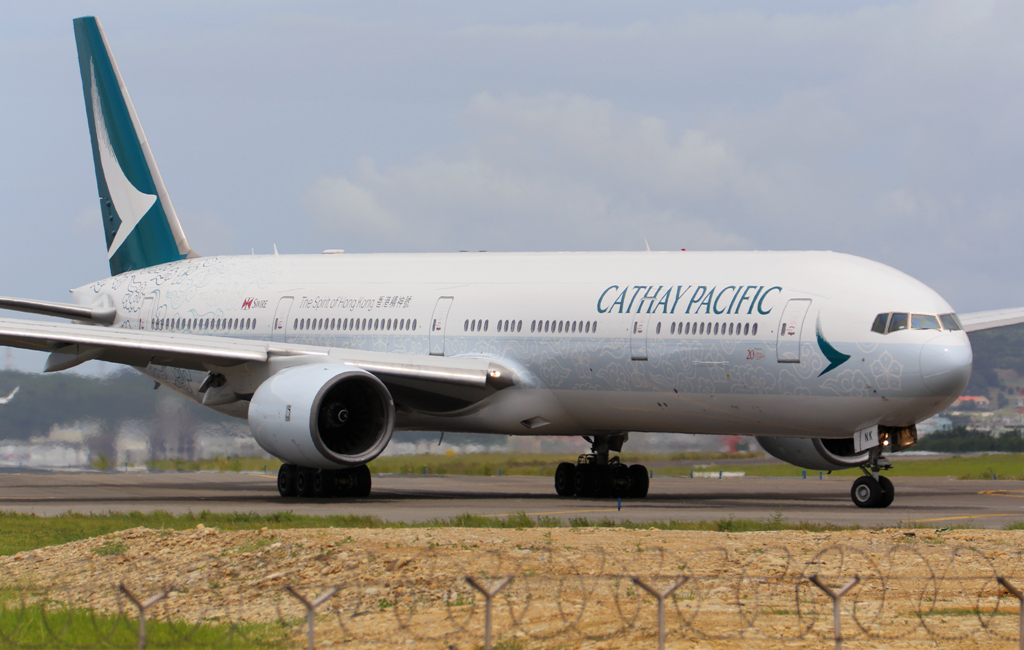
A Boeing 777-367 (B-HNK) in The Spirit of Hong Kong special livery

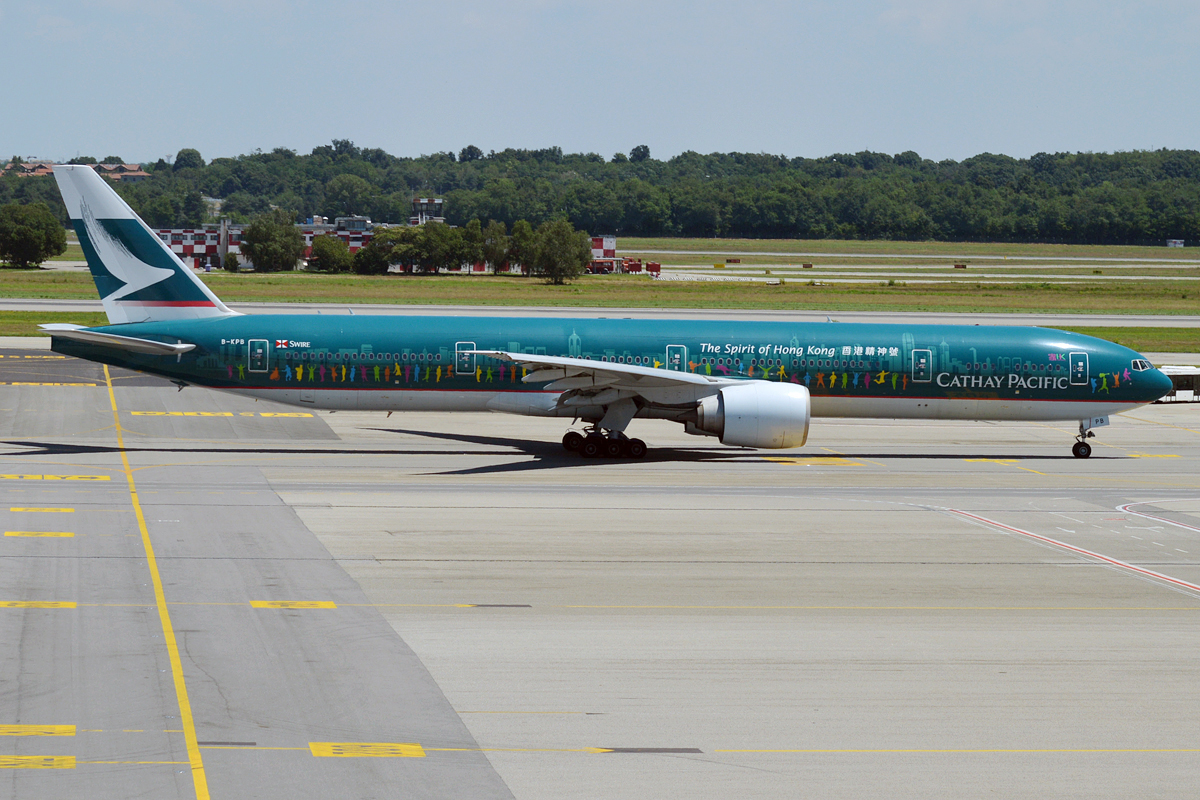
A Boeing 777-367ER (B-KPB) in The Spirit of Hong Kong special livery

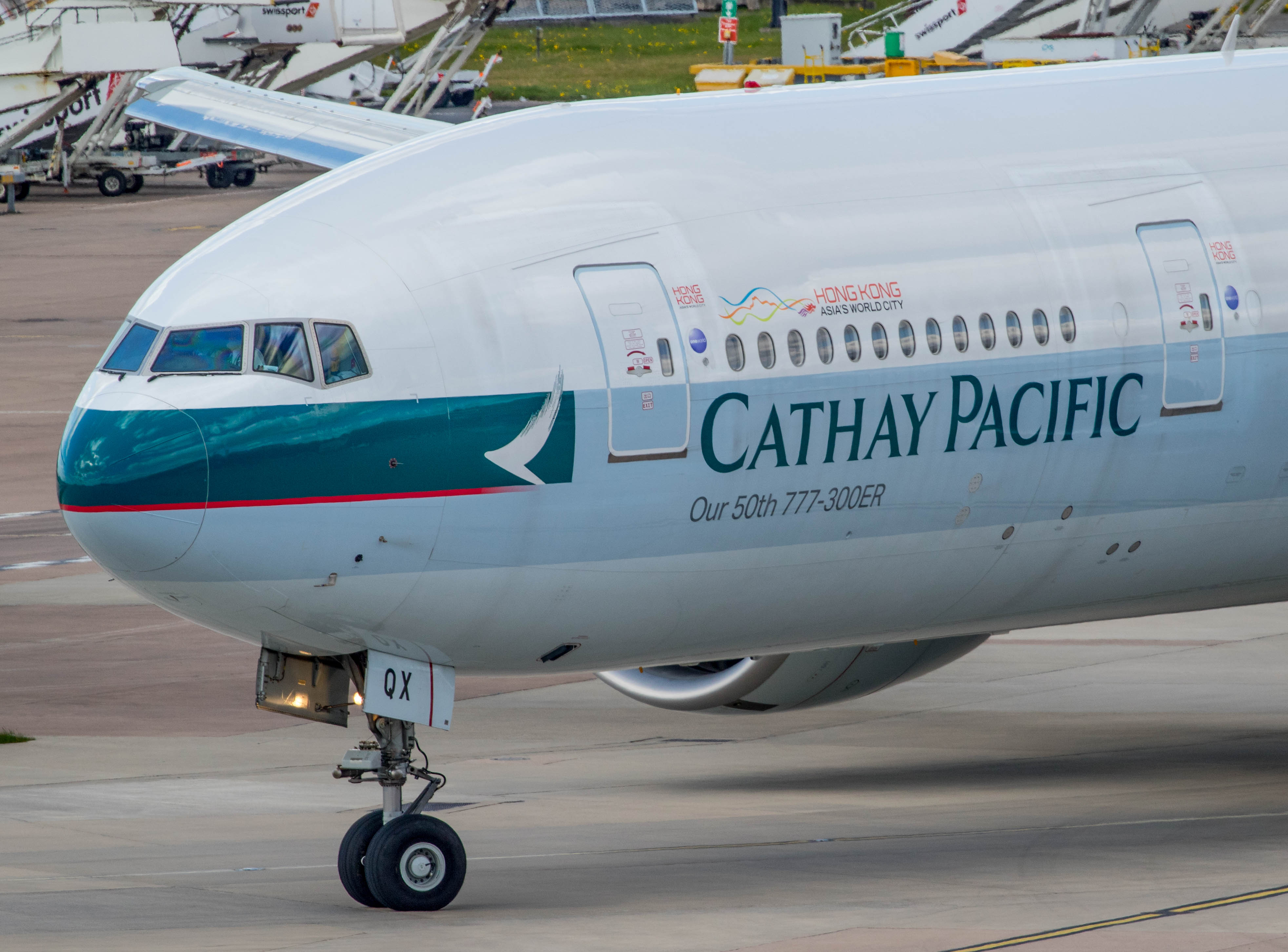
A Boeing 777-367ER (B-KQX) with the Our 50th 777-300ER special livery decal

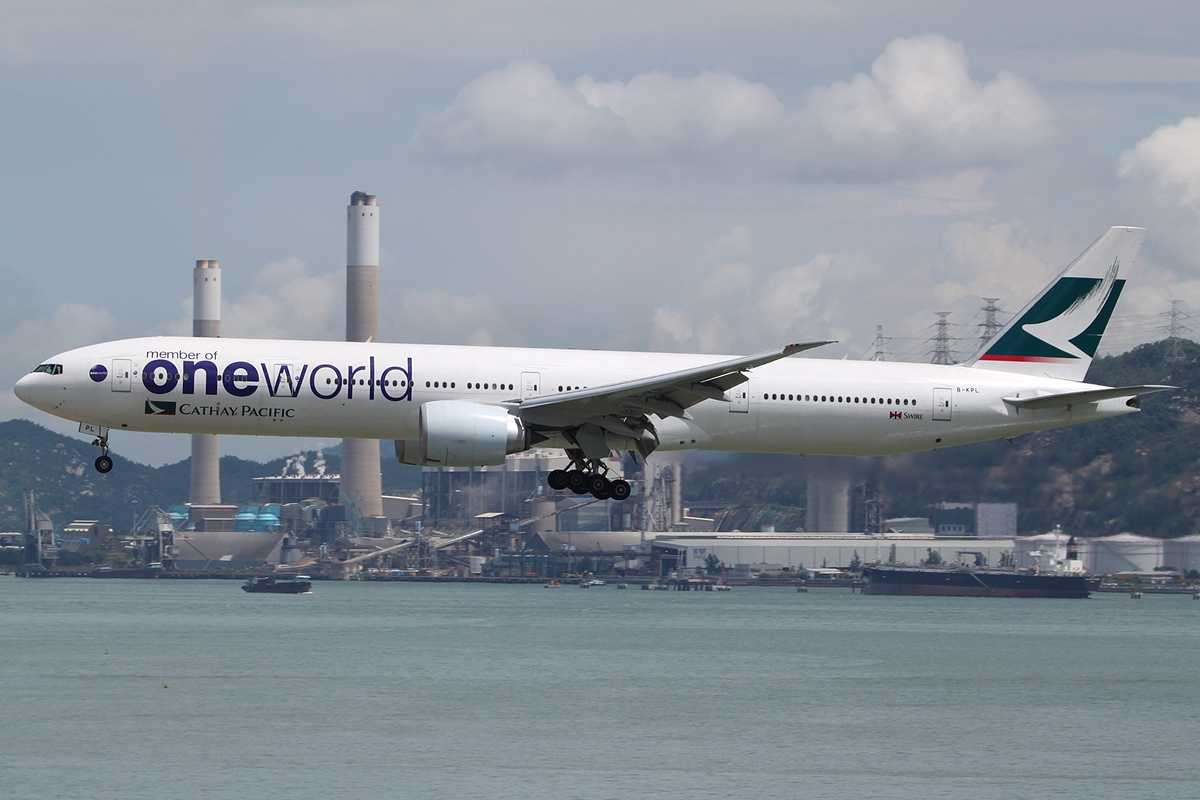
A Boeing 777-367ER (B-KPL) in Oneworld special livery

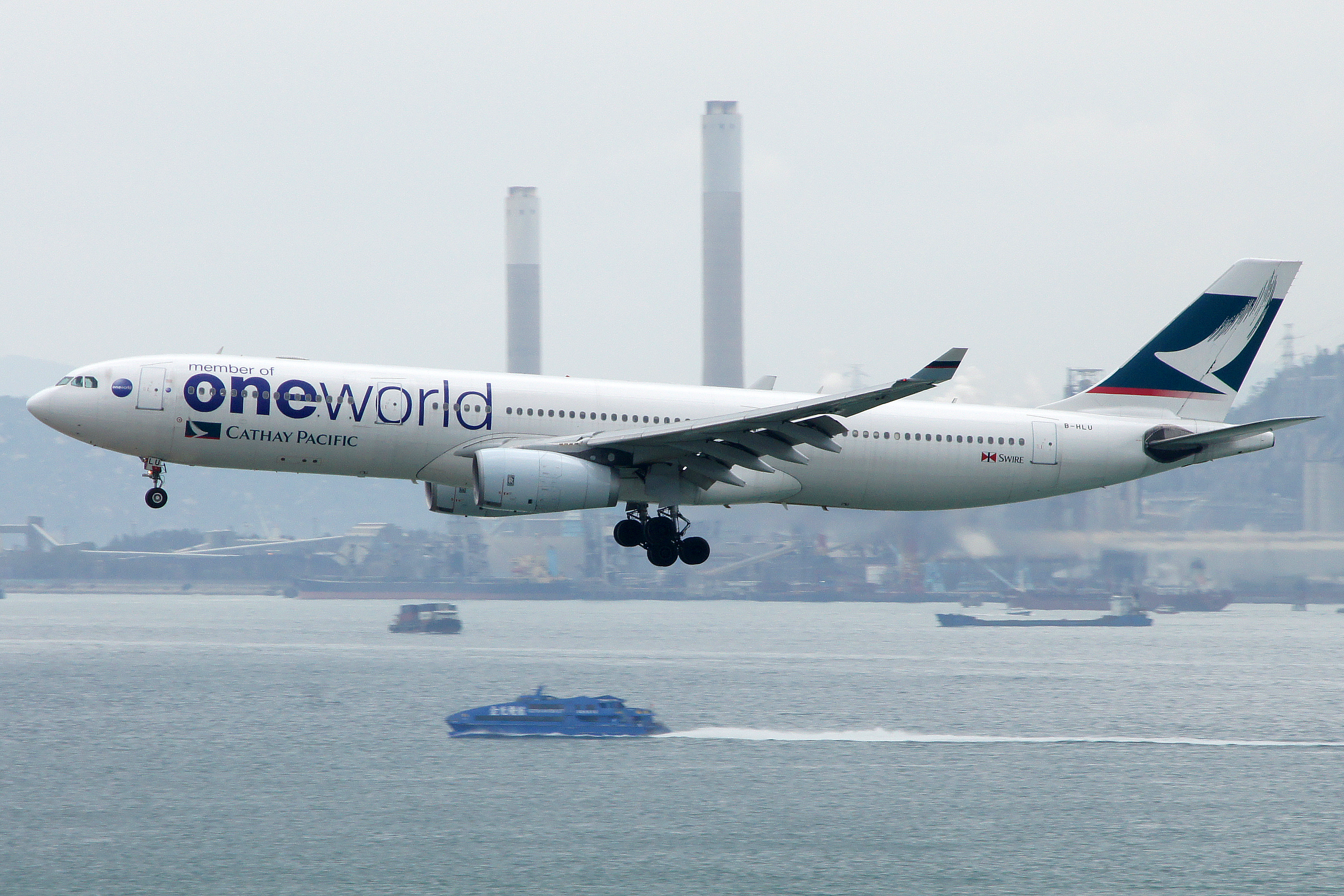
An Airbus A330-343 (B-HLU) in Oneworld special livery

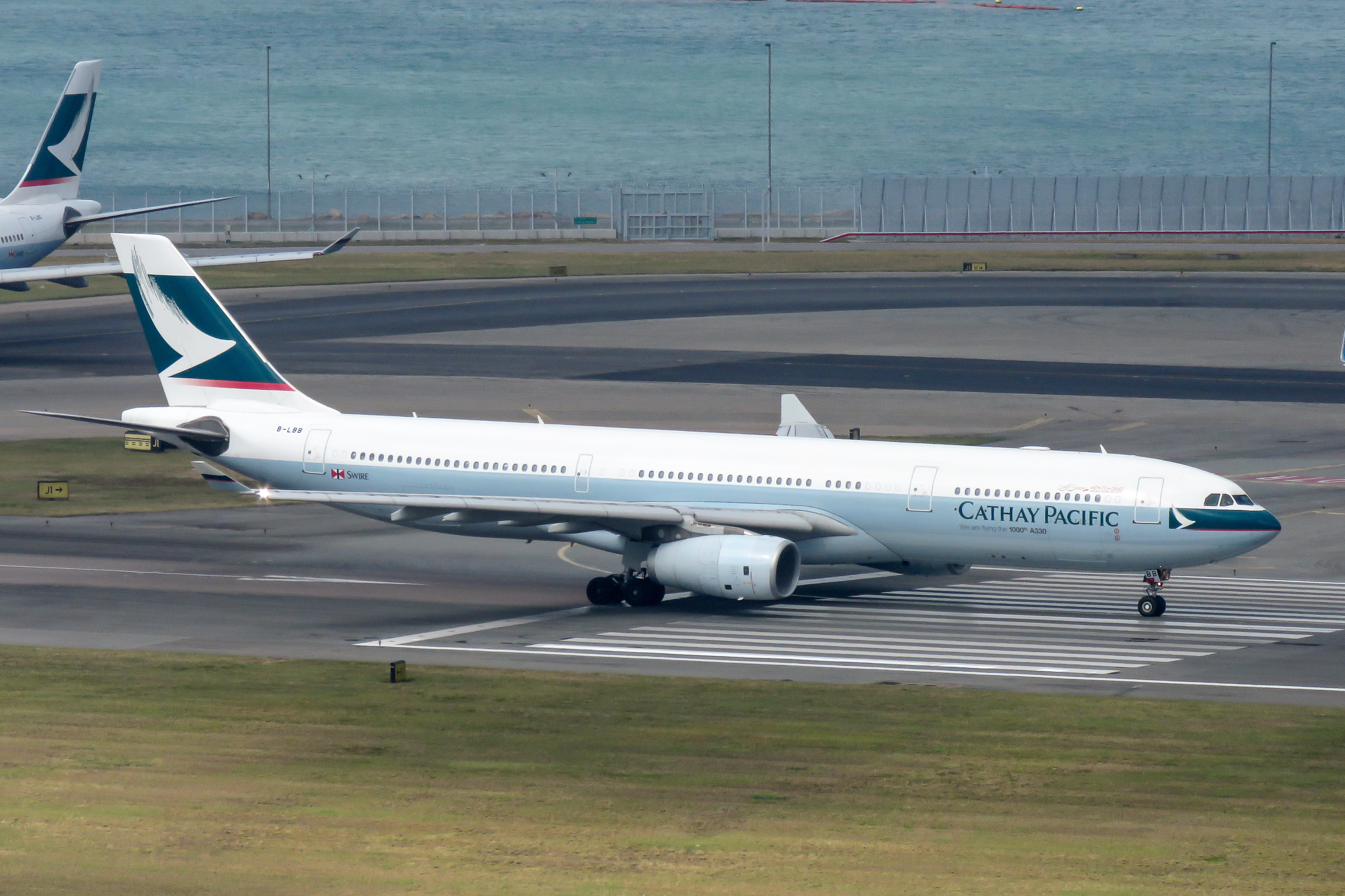
An Airbus A330-343 (B-LBB) with the We are flying the 1000th A330 special livery decal

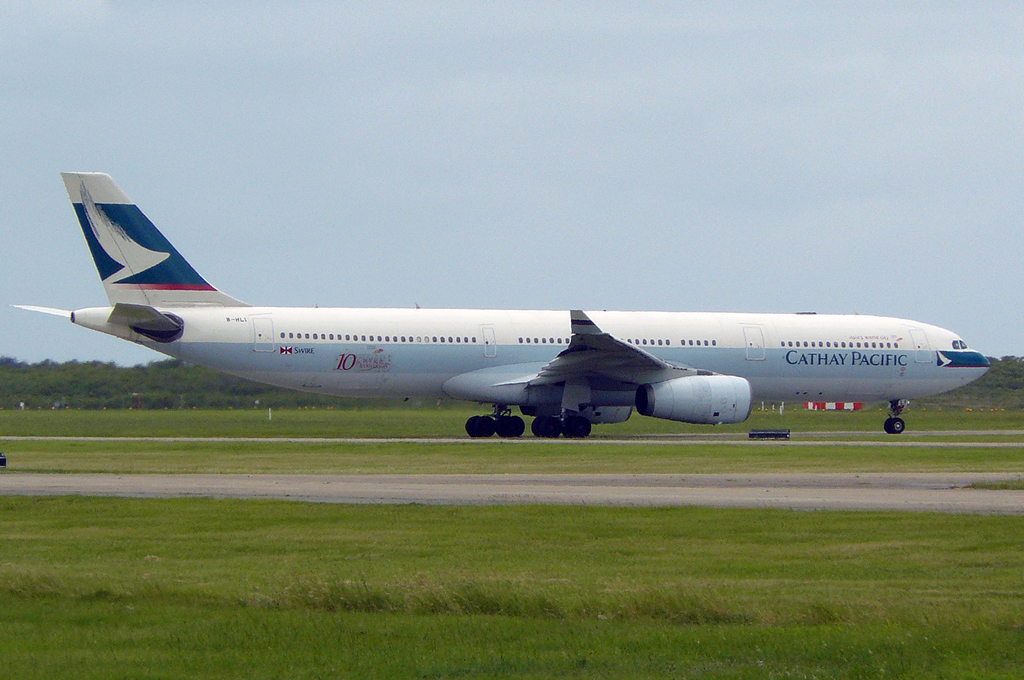
An Airbus A330-343 (B-HLI) with the HKSAR 10th Anniversary special livery decal

An Airbus A340-313 (B-HXG) in Oneworld special livery
Current Cathay Pacific special liveries

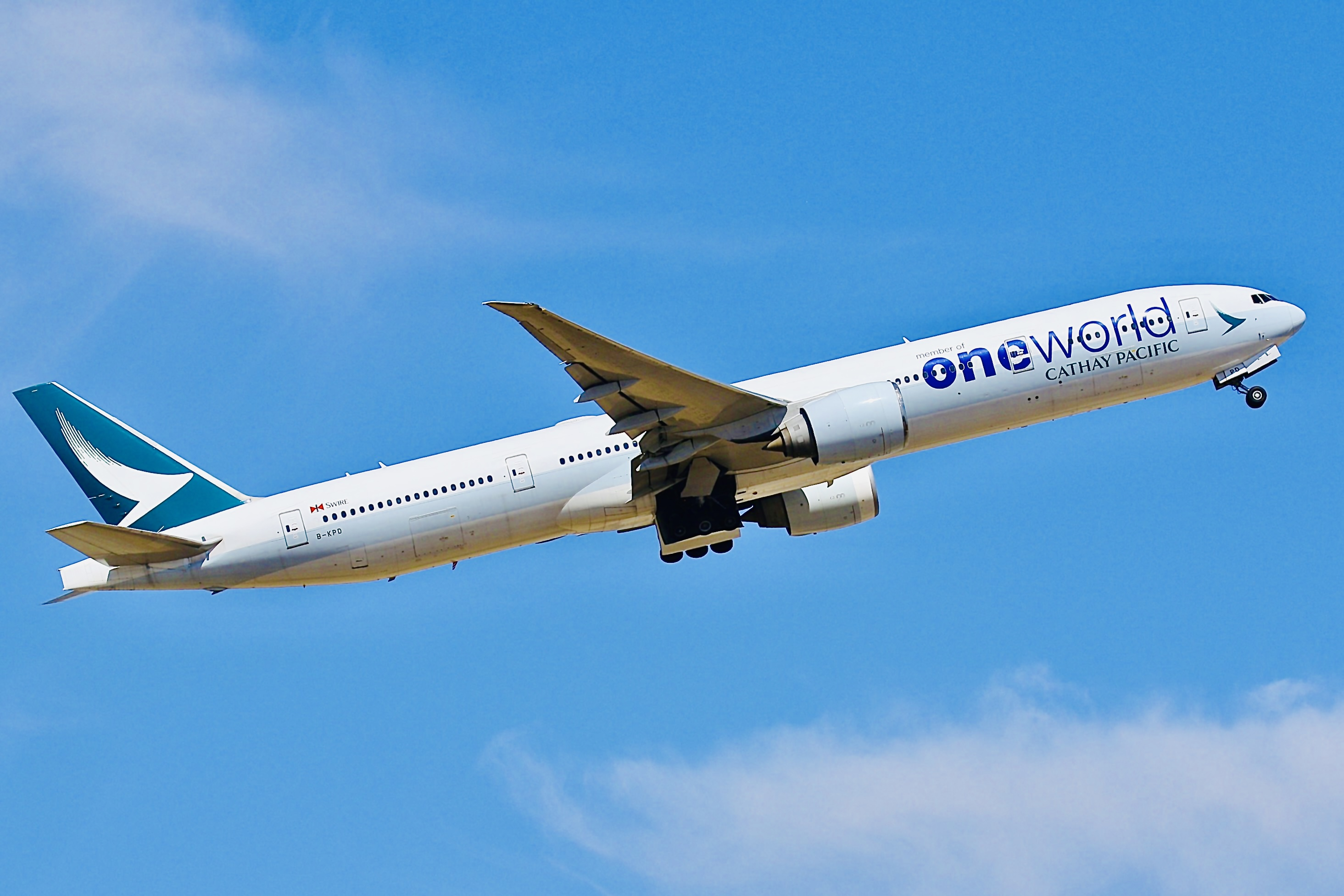
A Boeing 777-367ER (B-KPD) in Oneworld special livery

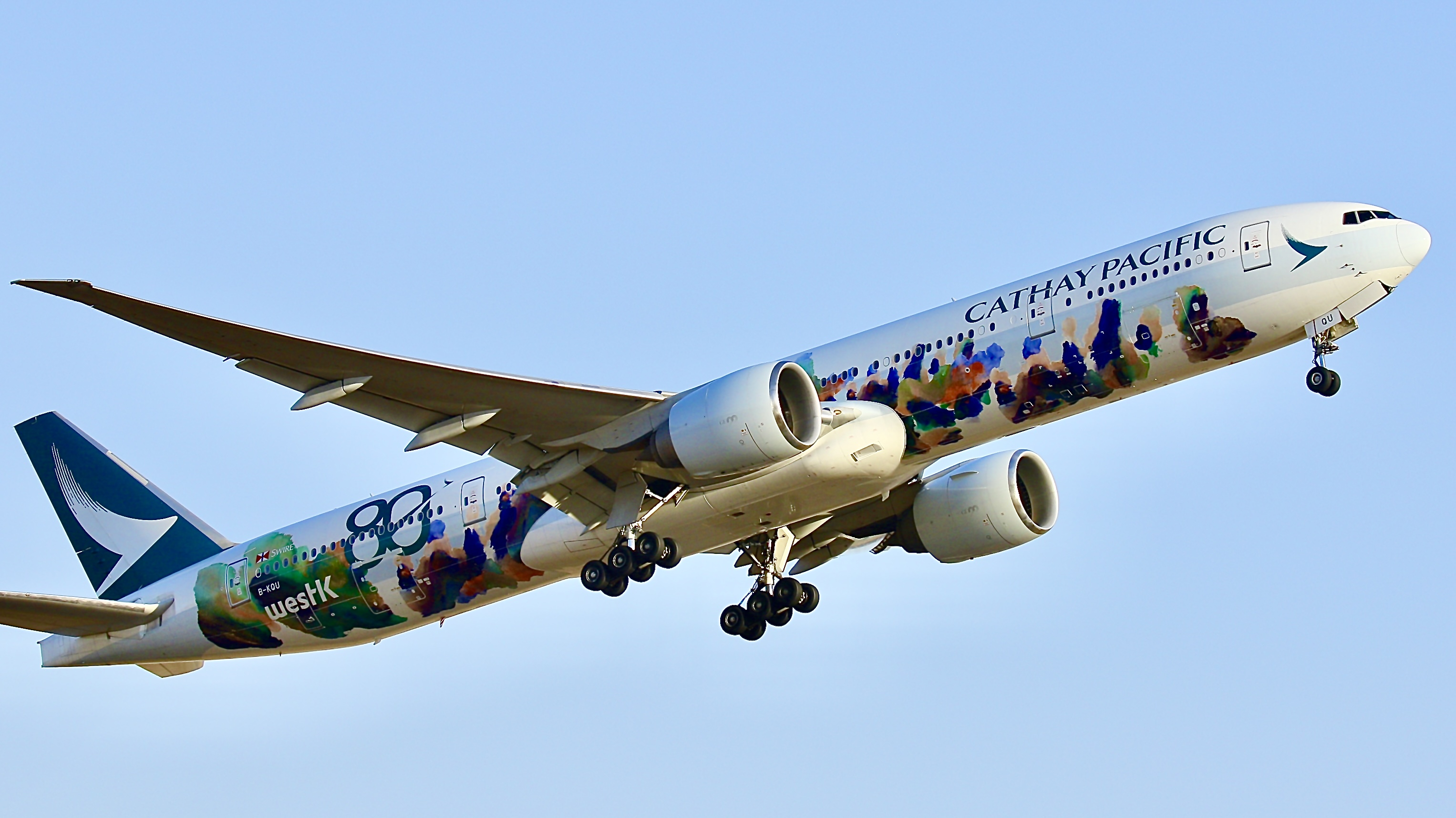
A Boeing 777-367ER (B-KQU) in The Spirit of Hong Kong special livery

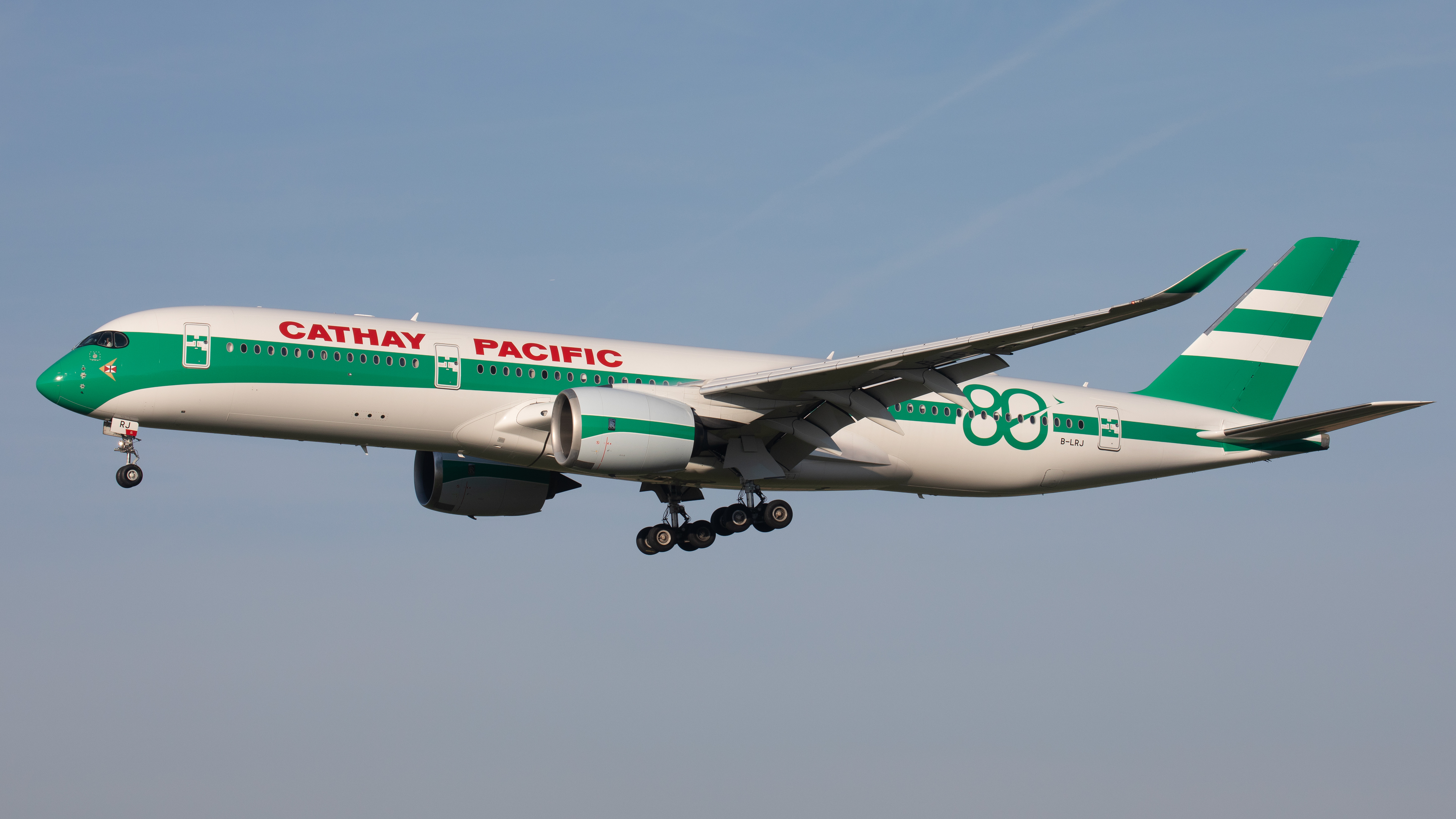
An Airbus A350-941 (B-LRJ) with the 80th anniversary retro livery

A Boeing 747-8F (B-LJE) with the 80th anniversary retro livery

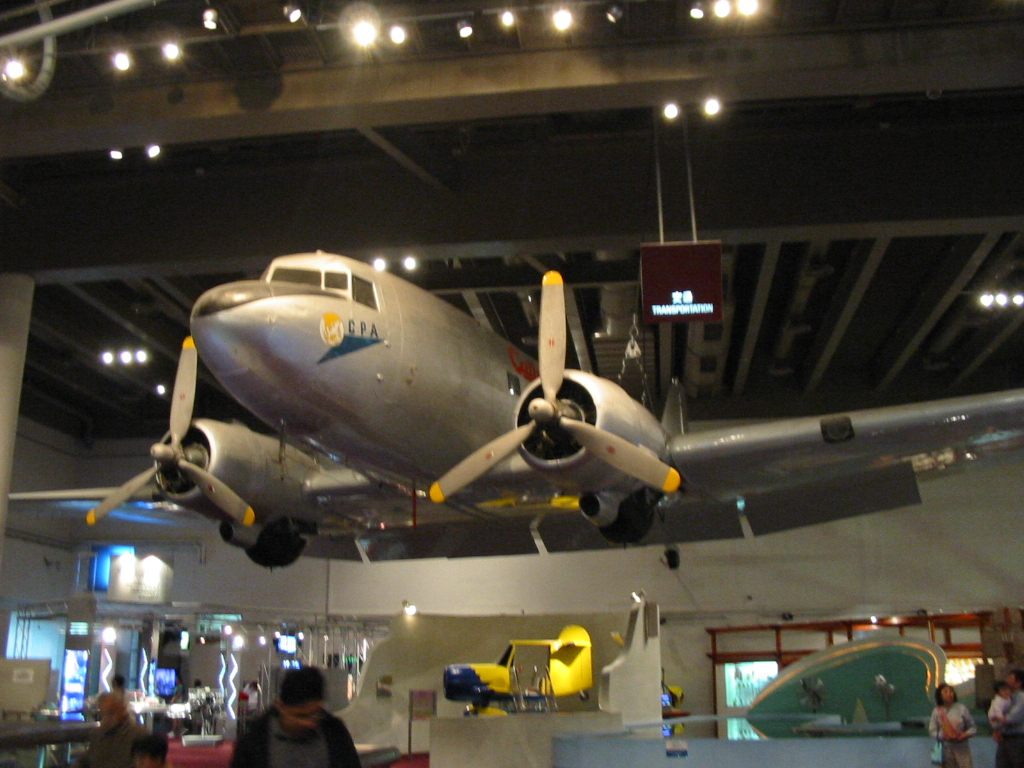
Betsy on display at the Hong Kong Science Museum

On 23 April 1996, an Airbus A330-300 (registered as VR-HYD) was painted and delivered in the special 50th Anniversary livery, in celebration of the airline's 50th Anniversary. The aircraft had a special decal placed at the vertical stabilizer. The sticker features a stylized "50". The green band around the nose is removed as well. However, the "Cathay Pacific" wordmark is retained. The aircraft was short-lived with Cathay Pacific, causing it to transfer to Dragonair in July 1996. This is possibly a concept of the new livery of Cathay Pacific, which was not yet released until November 2015.

In June 1997, a Boeing 747-200 (VR-HIB, later B-HIB) named Spirit of Hong Kong, was painted with a special livery, a big traditional Chinese brushstroke character "家" (means family/home), a slogan in traditional Chinese "繁榮進步 更創新高" painted on the left side of the aircraft and a slogan, "The Spirit of Hong Kong 97", painted on the right side of the aircraft, to commemorate the handover of Hong Kong from the United Kingdom to China. The aircraft was retired in December 1999. On 17 January 2000, Spirit of Hong Kong made a return on a Boeing 747-400 (B-HOX) to celebrate the legendary resilience of Hong Kong, with a new special livery depicting a young athlete overcoming a series of challenges to reach his goal. A special motto—'Same Team. Same Dream."—was painted on the left side of the aircraft, and a motto in traditional Chinese ("積極進取 飛越更高理想") was painted on the right side of the aircraft. The aircraft was repainted to the standard livery in December 2003. On 30 July 2013, Spirit of Hong Kong made another return, this time, on a Boeing 777-300ER (B-KPB). The livery features 110 people who represent the extraordinary spirit of Hong Kong people. The livery also bears the slogan "The Spirit of Hong Kong 香港精神號". The livery is the result of an online contest held by Cathay Pacific to call on Hong Kong people to submit creative entries that illustrate the true spirit of the city, along with a full-body photograph of themselves. The judging panel then chose 100 winners and 10 champions, and their silhouettes were painted on the aircraft. The aircraft was withdrawn from service in October 2018 at the expiration of its lease. On 27 June 2017, coinciding with the celebration of Hong Kong's 20th anniversary of its handover, Spirit of Hong Kong is also painted on a Boeing 777-300 (B-HNK), but instead of the original Spirit of Hong Kong livery, it is blended with clouds and flowers on the grey band on the fuselage and near the tail under the revised Cathay Pacific livery, until it was repainted into the standard livery in May 2024. It was also the sister aircraft to Cathay Dragon's Airbus A330-300 (B-HYB), which is also painted in a similar livery. In February 2026, Spirit of Hong Kong made another return on a Boeing 777-300ER (B-KQU) to commemorate the airline's 80th anniversary and the 30th anniversary of the handover the following year.

On 5 July 2002, a Boeing 747-400 (B-HOY)—named Asia's World City—carried a special livery, the "Asia's World City" branding, the Brand Hong Kong logotype and the dragon symbol, to promote Hong Kong around the world. The aircraft was repainted to the standard Cathay Pacific livery in March 2008. In January 2008, it was also painted and delivered on the same livery, this time on a Boeing 777-300ER (B-KPF), until it was repainted into the standard Cathay Pacific livery in March 2014.

On 29 August 2006, the airline took delivery of its 100th aircraft, an Airbus A330-300 (B-LAD). For the aircraft acceptance ceremony in Toulouse, the aircraft was painted in a 100th aircraft livery with the slogan "100th aircraft," and the slogan in traditional Chinese "進步精神" painted on the rear of the aircraft. The aircraft was repainted into the standard Cathay Pacific livery in September 2012. The aircraft was named Progress Hong Kong, a name that was chosen as the result of a competition among the staff.

In November 2011, Cathay Pacific received its second 747-8 freighter (B-LJA), which was painted in the Hong Kong Trader livery. The livery was designed to commemorate the topping out of the new Cathay Pacific Cargo Terminal. The name of the livery was taken from Cathay Pacific's very first 747 freighter, which entered the fleet in 1982. The aircraft was eventually repainted into the revised Cathay Pacific livery in August 2018.

Several Cathay Pacific aircraft have been painted in the Oneworld livery, the first to commemorate the alliance's 10th anniversary. On 12 March 2009, Cathay Pacific's first Oneworld aircraft, an Airbus A340-300 (B-HXG), was painted in the new, standard Oneworld livery, and was retired in March 2017. A second aircraft, an Airbus A330-300 (B-HLU), was painted in the Oneworld livery from September 2009, until it was repainted into the revised Cathay Pacific livery in June 2023, while a Boeing 777-300ER (B-KPL) was painted and delivered in the Oneworld livery on 17 October 2009, until it was repainted into the revised Cathay Pacific livery in November 2017. The latter aircraft was withdrawn from service in June 2020 amidst the COVID-19 pandemic and returned to its lessor in August 2021 at the expiration of its lease. Five Boeing 777-300ERs (B-KPD, B-KQI, B-KQL, B-KQM & B-KQN) then received the Oneworld livery under the revised Cathay Pacific livery in March, April, September, December 2019 and January 2020, respectively, in celebration of the alliance's 20th anniversary in March 2019. However, the Oneworld logo beside the cockpit windows was replaced by the Cathay Pacific logo, as well as the grey band retaining on the fuselage.

In December 2025, an Airbus A350-900 (B-LRJ) received its retro "Lettuce Sandwich" livery to coincide with the airline's 80th anniversary celebration, followed by a Boeing 747-8F (B-LJE), in January 2026.

== Former fleet ==
Since its inception in 1946, the Cathay Pacific fleet has operated many types of aircraft. The first two aircraft were two World War II surplus Douglas DC-3s, named Betsy and Niki. Betsy (registration VR-HDB), the first aircraft for Cathay Pacific, is now a permanent exhibit in the Hong Kong Science Museum. Niki was lost, but a similar DC-3 was purchased as a replacement. It was refurbished and repainted by the airline's engineering department and maintenance provider, Hong Kong Aircraft Engineering Company, and it now wears the second Cathay Pacific livery from the late 1940s. This aircraft is now on public view in the car park outside the Flight Training Center of Cathay City. Cathay Pacific was at one time the largest operator of the Lockheed L-1011 outside of the United States, with a fleet of 19 (Delta Air Lines in the U.S. was the largest, with 71), before being replaced by the Airbus A330-342s in 1996.

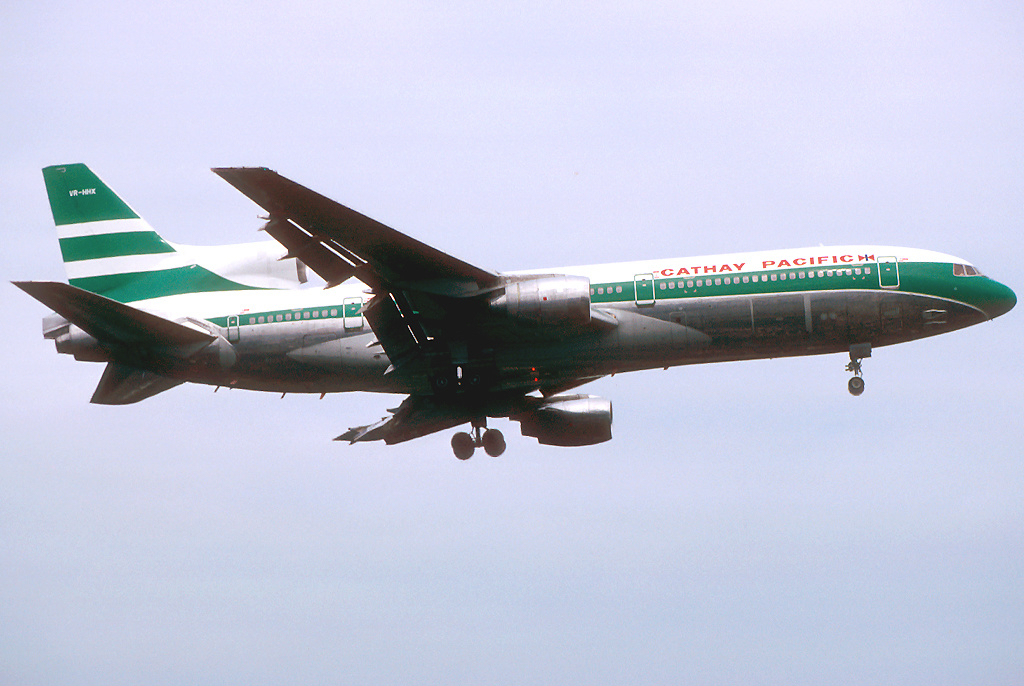
Lockheed L-1011-100 TriStar

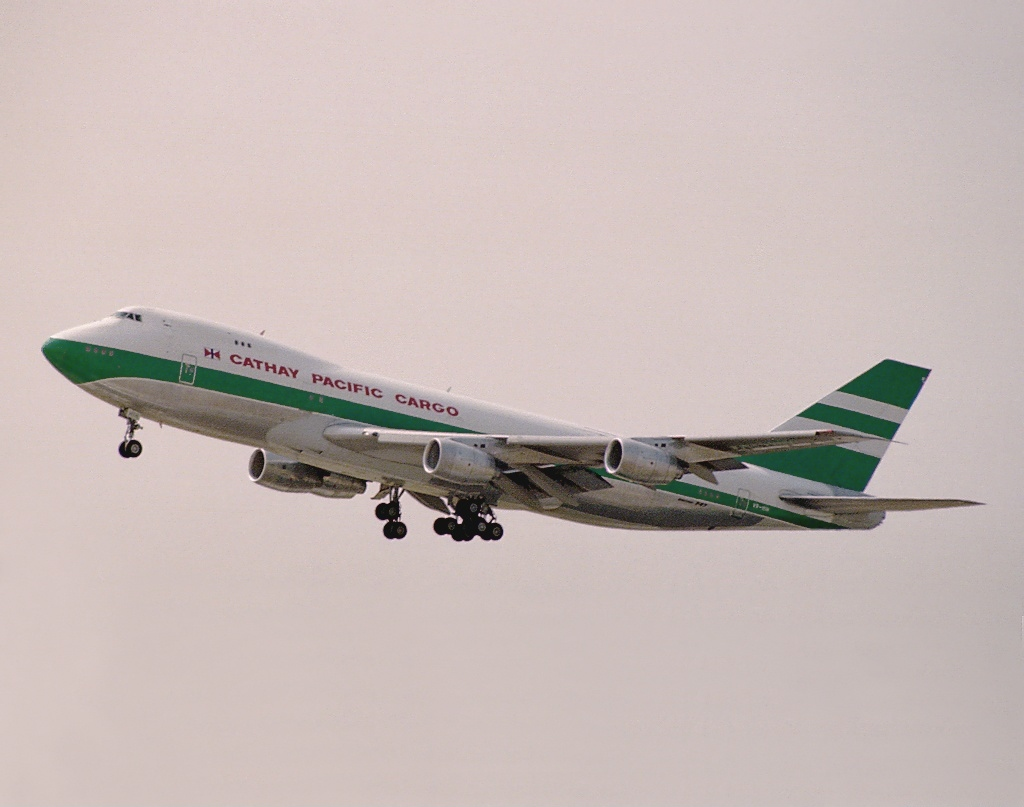
Boeing 747-200SF

Cathay Pacific retired fleet
Aircraft	Total	Introduced	Retired	Notes
Airbus A320-200	3	2021	2023	Former Cathay Dragon fleet. Never wore Cathay Pacific livery. Some aircraft transferred to HK Express. Airbus A321 aircraft that didn't go to HK Express were converted into freighters.
Airbus A321-200	5	2021	2023	Former Cathay Dragon fleet. Never wore Cathay Pacific livery. Some aircraft transferred to HK Express. Airbus A321 aircraft that didn't go to HK Express were converted into freighters.
Airbus A340-200	4	1994	1996	Leased from AFS before delivery of the A340-300.
Airbus A340-300	15	1996	2017	
Airbus A340-600	3	2002	2009	
Avro Anson	2	1948	1950	
Boeing 707-320C	12	1971	1983	
Boeing 747-200B	9	1979	1999	
Boeing 747-200F	3	1981	2008	
Boeing 747-200SF	4	1992	2009	
Boeing 747-300	6	1985	1999	Sold to Pakistan International Airlines.
Boeing 747-400	26	1989	2016	5 aircraft were powered by Pratt & Whitney PW4000 engines.
Boeing 747-400BCF	14	2005	2019	
Boeing 747-400F	6	1994	2016	
Boeing 777-200	4	1996	2019	
Boeing 777-200	1	1996	2018	The prototype, B-HNL, was donated to Pima Air & Space Museum.
Consolidated Catalina	3	1947	1948	
Convair 880	7	1962	1975	First jet aircraft type operated by the airline.
Convair 880	1	1962	1967	Crashed as flight CX033.
Convair 880	1	1962	1972	Crashed as flight CX700Z.
Douglas DC-3	7	1946	1961	First aircraft used by the airline. Aircraft that operated the airline's inaugural flight was donated to the Hong Kong Science Museum.
Douglas DC-4	2	1949	1963	
Douglas DC-6	2	1955	1962	
Lockheed L-188 Electra	2	1959	1967	
Lockheed L-1011 TriStar	19	1975	1996	
