= Jardine Aviation Services =

Jardine Airport Services Limited
- Trade name: Jardine Aviation Services
- Native name: 怡中航空服務有限公司
- Type: Subsidiary
- Industry: Ground handling
- Founded: 29 November 1988
- Headquarters: Hong Kong
- Area served: Hong Kong
- Parent: China National Aviation Holding (50%); Jardine Matheson (50%)
- Subsidiaries: Jardine Air Terminal Services
- Website: jasg.com

Jardine Airport Services Limited (JASL) trading as Jardine Aviation Services and JASG, formed in 1988 as a joint venture of Jardine Matheson (via Jardine Pacific) and Air China Group (via CNAC(G)). However, Jardines' involvement in Hong Kong aviation began as early as 1946 as Jardine Airways (later merged as Hong Kong Airways).

It offers a complete range of ground handling services at the Hong Kong International Airport.

As at 2002, it handles a quarter of aircraft movements, and over 17% of total passenger throughput, at the Hong Kong International Airport.

On January 25, 2024, Jardine Group transferred its equity to Menzies Aviation. After the transaction is completed, Menzies Aviation Service Group will be renamed "Menzies Aviation Services" and officially become a subsidiary of Menzies Aviation.

== Ground Handling Services ==
- Passenger Services
  - Check-in Services
  - Reception and Boarding Services
  - Baggage Lost and Found Services
  - Ticketing and Passenger Information Services
- Operations Control
  - Flight operations
  - Crew administration / centralized crew administration
  - Load control / centralized load control
  - Turnaround coordination
  - Manpower planning
- Cargo Services
- Ramp Services

== Customers Airlines ==
The company serves over 60 international passenger and cargo airlines:

- AeroLogic
- Air Canada
- Air China
- Air China Cargo
- Air France
- Air New Zealand
- Air Macau
- All Nippon Airways
- Atlas Air
- Bassaka Air
- British Airways
- Cebu Pacific
- China Cargo Airlines
- China Eastern Airlines
- China Southern Airlines
- Eastar Jet
- El Al
- EVA Air
- Emirates
- Finnair
- Garuda Indonesia
- Gulf Air
- Jeju Air
- Jetstar Japan
- Jin Air
- KLM
- Korean Air
- Lufthansa
- Lufthansa Cargo
- Mandarin Airlines
- MIAT Mongolian Airlines
- Myanmar National Airlines
- Nippon Cargo Airlines
- Pacific Airlines
- Peach Aviation
- Philippine Airlines
- Polar Air Cargo
- Shanghai Airlines
- Sichuan Airlines
- Singapore Airlines
- Southern Air
- SriLankan Airlines
- Swiss International Air Lines
- Virgin Atlantic
- Xiamen Airlines

== Jardine Aviation Academy ==
Jardine Aviation Academy (JAA), an IATA Regional Training Partner (RTP) that delivers IATA ground operation trainings.
