= China National Aviation Holding =

Chinese state-owned enterprise

China National Aviation Holding Corporation Limited

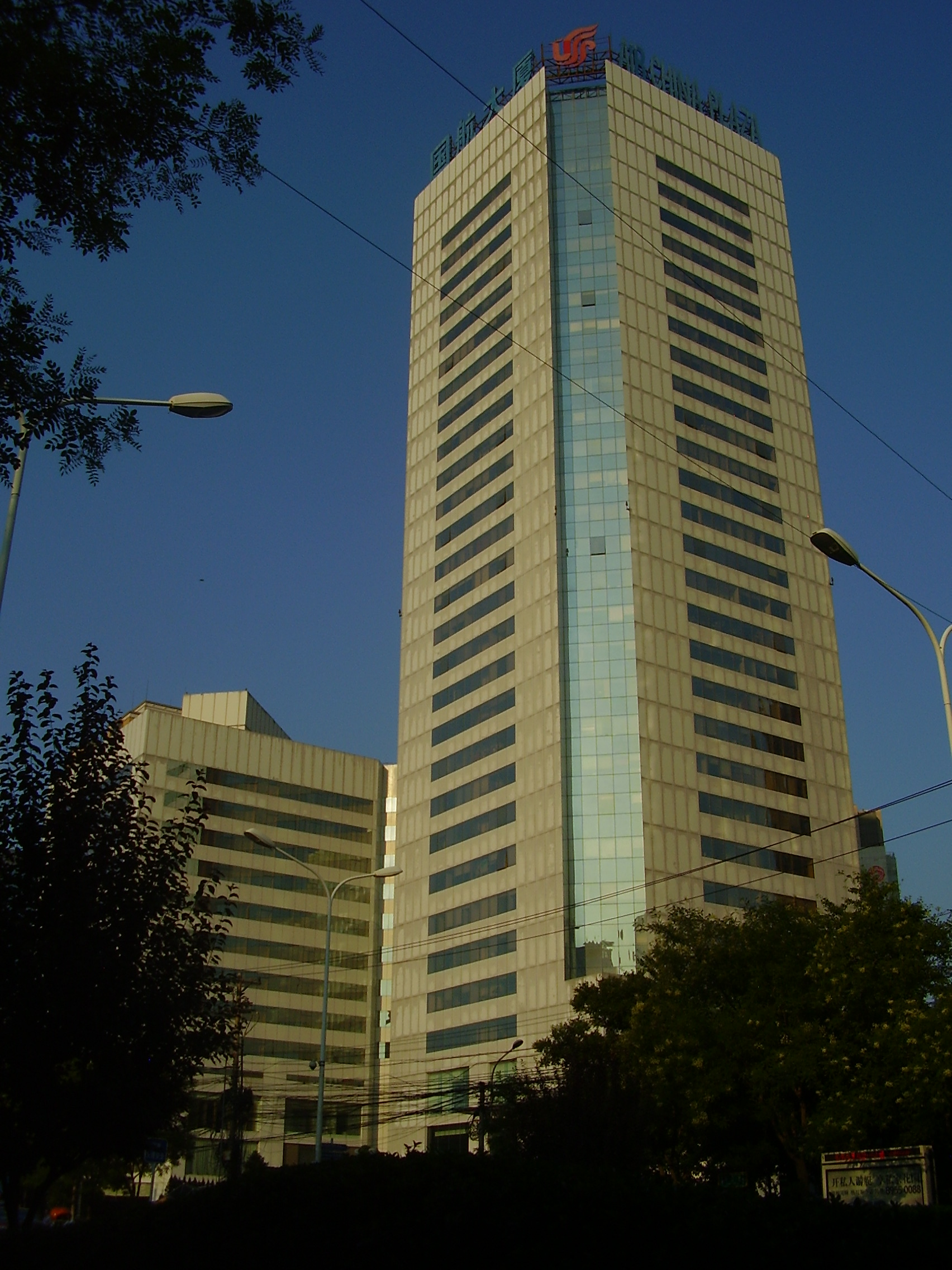
- Air China Plaza (Chinese: 国航大厦; pinyin: Guó Háng Dàshà), the headquarters of the group
- Native name: 中國航空集團有限公司
- Type: State-owned enterprise
- Founded: 11 October 2002; 24 years ago (re-incorporation)
- Headquarters: Air China Plaza, Beijing, China
- Subsidiaries: Air China (53.46%); Air Macau (72.25%); CNAC Group (100%)
- Website: www.airchinagroup.com
- Footnotes in a consolidated basis, excluding minority interests

China National Aviation Holding Corporation Limited
- Simplified Chinese: 中国航空集团有限公司
- Traditional Chinese: 中國航空集團有限公司
Transcriptions
Standard Mandarin
- Hanyu Pinyin: Zhōngguó Hángkōng Jítuán Yǒuxiàn Gōngsī

Air China Group
- Simplified Chinese: 中航集团
- Traditional Chinese: 中航集團
Transcriptions
Standard Mandarin
- Hanyu Pinyin: Zhōngháng Jítuán

Second alternative Chinese name
- Simplified Chinese: 国航集团
- Traditional Chinese: 國航集團
Transcriptions
Standard Mandarin
- Hanyu Pinyin: Guóháng Jítuán

China National Aviation Holding Corporation Limited is a Chinese state-owned enterprise which is the parent company of Air China and Air Macau. The company was formed on 11 October 2002 by the merger of Air China, China Southwest Airlines, and China National Aviation Corporation (Group) Limited.

== History ==
=== Origins of China National Aviation Holding ===
The major carrier of China could be traced back to China National Aviation Corporation which was nationalized in 1949. In 1988, Air China (Chinese: 中国国际航空公司; lit. 'China International Airline Company') and other airlines were formed by the separation of commercial activity and regulating body of the government.

The once defunct aforementioned legal person of the group China National Aviation Corporation (Chinese: 中國航空股份有限公司) was also re-registered in Hong Kong on 31 August 1984 as a foreign company. The company was re-registered in China in May 1991, which Civil Aviation Administration of China owned 79% stake, Air China, China Eastern Airlines and China Southern Airlines owned 7% each.

On 11 October 2002, the new China National Aviation Corporation merged with Air China and China Southwest Airlines, forming China National Aviation Holding Company (Chinese: 中国航空集团公司) under the Law on Industrial Enterprises Owned by the Whole People.

After the merger, China National Aviation Corporation's subsidiaries in Hong Kong still used the name "China National Aviation Corporation (Hong Kong)" and "China National Aviation Corporation (Group)."

=== China National Aviation Corporation ===
China National Aviation Corporation (Group) and China National Aviation Company Limited logo, similar to the defunct company

China National Aviation Corporation was acted as a "window company" in the British Colony since 1984, even after the handover of Hong Kong back to China, and ceased to do business in Hong Kong 10 years later (on 10 August 2007). Several subsidiaries were also incorporated in Hong Kong, such as China National Aviation Corporation (Hong Kong) Limited on 4 August 1992 and then China National Aviation Corporation (Group) Limited on 13 June 1995 (CNAC (HK) became its subsidiary) and the subsidiary even used a logo similar to China National Aviation Corporation.

CNAC once owned a significant stake in Dragonair and LSG Lufthansa Service Hong Kong. The stakes, along with 50% stake of Jardine Airport Services (JASL) was transferred to a listed subsidiary China National Aviation Company Limited (former ticker symbol SEHK:1110, incorporated on 3 February 1997). In turn, China National Aviation Company Limited was 69% owned by Air China Limited (acquired from CNAC(G)). The stake in Dragonair (43.29%) was acquired by Cathay Pacific in 2006, and China National Aviation Company Limited was also privatized in 2007 by Air China Limited. On 10 June 2008, the 50% stake in JASL was sold back from Air China to CNAC(G).

Dragonair, as of 2016, was a wholly owned subsidiary of Cathay Pacific, which Air China, now a subsidiary of China National Aviation Holding, had a cross ownership between the two listed companies.

CNAC also purchased a building on 10 Queen's Road Central, Central, Hong Kong Island in 1992, known as CNAC Group Building. It was once owned by the listed company China National Aviation Company Limited but sold back to CNAC(G) in 2002. It was sold in 2008 to Shanghai Commercial Bank for HK$1.388 billion. It was demolished to make way for the headquarters of Shanghai Commercial Bank.

==== U.S. sanctions ====
In January 2021, the United States government named China National Aviation Holding as a company "owned or controlled" by the People's Liberation Army and thereby prohibited any American company or individual from investing in it.

== Corporate affairs ==
=== Subsidiaries ===
China National Aviation Holding is the majority owner of several airlines and subsidiaries, including:
Airline share ownership and subsidiaries:

- Air Macau (72.25%)
- Air China (53.46%)
  - Dalian Airlines (80%)
  - Air China Cargo (51%)
  - Shenzhen Airlines (51%)
    - Kunming Airlines (80%)
    - Henan Airlines (51%)
  - Shandong Aviation Group (49.4%)
    - Shandong Airlines (22.8% direct, 42% via Shandong Aviation Group)
      - Sichuan Airlines (10%)
  - Cathay Pacific (~20% cross-ownership)
  - China National Aviation Company Limited (100%)
  - Aircraft Maintenance and Engineering Corporation (75%)

- China Eastern Airlines (11%)
  - Shanghai Airlines (100%)
    - China United Airlines (80%)
    - Sichuan Airlines (10%)
  - China Cargo Airlines (51%)

Other operations:

- China National Aviation Corporation (Group) (100%)
  - China Aircraft Services Limited (40% as the largest shareholder)
  - Jardine Aviation Services (50%)

=== Business trends ===
The key trends for the Air China Group are (as of the financial year ending 31 December):

	Total revenue (RMB b)	Net profit (Note: "Profit attributable to equity shareholders of the Company") (RMB b)	Number of passengers (m)	Passenger load factor (%)	Cargo and mail carried (000 tons)	Total aircraft	References
2010	80.4	11.9	60.0	80.0	1,347	393	
2011	95.9	7.5	69.6	81.4	1,426	432	
2012	99.6	4.8	72.4	80.4	1,460	461	
2013	98.2	3.2	80.8	77.6	1,456	497	
2014	105	3.8	83.0	79.8	1,552	540	
2015	110	7.0	89.8	79.9	1,664	590	
2016	115	6.8	96.6	80.6	1,769	623	
2017	121	7.2	101	81.1	1,841	655	
2018	136	7.3	109	80.6	1,460	684	
2019	136	6.4	115	81.0	1,434	699	
2020	69.5	−14.4	68.6	70.3	1,113	707	
2021	74.5	−16.6	69.0	68.6	1,186	746	
2022	52.8	−38.6	38.6	62.7	844	762	
2023	148	−1.0	130	73.2	1,070	905	

== Fleet ==
As of February 2025, the combined fleet of Air China and its subsidiaries consists of the following aircraft:

China National Aviation Holding fleet
Type	In service	Orders	Operators
Airbus A319-100	31	—	Air China, Shenzhen Airlines
Airbus A319neo	—	10	Air China
Airbus A320-200	120	—	Air China, Air Macau, Shenzhen Airlines
Airbus A320neo	84	18	Air China, Air Macau, Shenzhen Airlines
Airbus A321-200	69	—	Air China, Air Macau
Airbus A321neo	40	64	Air China, Air Macau, Shenzhen Airlines
Airbus A330-200	18	—	Air China
Airbus A330-200/P2F	4	4	Air China Cargo
Airbus A330-300	34	—	Air China, Shenzhen Airlines
Airbus A350-900	30	—	Air China
Boeing 737-700	31	—	Air China, Air China Inner Mongolia, Beijing Airlines, Kunming Airlines, Shandong Airlines
Boeing 737-800	326	—	Air China, Air China Inner Mongolia, Beijing Airlines, Dalian Airlines, Kunming Airlines, Shandong Airlines, Shenzhen Airlines
Boeing 737 MAX 8	53	47	Air China, Kunming Airlines, Shandong Airlines, Shenzhen Airlines
Boeing 747-400	2	—	Air China
Boeing 747-400F	3	—	Air China Cargo
Boeing 747-8I	7	—	Air China
Boeing 777-300ER	28	—	Air China
Boeing 777F	12	—	Air China Cargo
Boeing 787-9	14	—	Air China
COMAC ARJ21-700	33	12	Air China, Shandong Airlines
COMAC C919-100ER	3	102	Air China
Total	942	257	
