= Ameco =

Ameco may refer to:

- Ameco Beijing, the Aircraft Maintenance and Engineering Corporation, a Chinese company
- Amusement Equipment Company, operator of Welsh Mumbles Pier and a manufacturer of Paratrooper fairground rides
- Annual macroeconomic database of the EU commission
- Amhara Media Corporation, media organization based in Amhara Region, Ethiopia
