= China Aircraft Services Limited =

Provider of aircraft line and base maintenance

- Native name: 中國飛機服務有限公司
- Type: Joint venture
- Founded: 24 March 1994; 32 years ago (incorporation); 19 July 1994; 32 years ago (current name); 1995; 31 years ago (start business)
- Headquarters: 81 South Perimeter Road, HK Int'l Airport, Hong Kong
- Owner: China National Aviation Corporation (Group) Limited (40%); China Airlines (20%); United Airlines (20%); Gama Group (Asia) Limited (20%)

China Aircraft Services Limited (Chinese: 中國飛機服務有限公司), better known as CASL (Chinese: 中飛), is a major provider of aircraft line and base maintenance, ground support equipment services, and cabin cleaning services at Hong Kong International Airport.

== History ==
CASL was founded in 1995 as a joint venture among Air China Group (via CNAC(G)), British Airways, Hutchison Whampoa (China), and United Airlines. Since the 2005, it has been a joint venture among China National Aviation Corporation (Group) Limited (40%), Hutchison Whampoa China (20%), United Airlines (20%), and China Airlines (20%). China Airlines acquired 13.33% stake from CNAC(G) in 2005 (which was acquired from British Airways in 2003) and 6.67% from Hutchison Whampoa China. Since 2015, Hutchison Whampoa China became a wholly owned subsidiary of CK Hutchison Holdings. CASL is now a joint venture among China National Aviation Corporation (Group) Limited (40%), United Airlines, Inc. (20%), China Airlines Limited (20%) and Gama Group (Asia) Limited (20%).

In October 2014, CASL extended its line maintenance services to Dragonair. The company now has over 80 customer airlines, major ones include Cathay Dragon, Hong Kong Airlines, HK Express and Air Macau.

Apart from operating in Hong Kong, CASL and China Eastern Airlines established a joint venture company in a 40-60 ratio, Shanghai Eastern Aircraft Maintenance Limited (SEAM), providing aircraft line maintenance and ground support equipment services at Shanghai Pudong International Airport since 2002.

== Business overview ==
CASL employs more than 1,000 staff members. CASL offers a range of services listed below:

- Line maintenance, provides full line maintenance and outstation support services to an extensive range of aircraft types. Services include turnaround and overnight aircraft routine and non-routine maintenance services, including engine change, fuel tank leak repair, cabin and IFE system maintenance and A-checks.
- Base maintenance, hangar capable of housing a wide-body and a narrow-body aircraft simultaneously. Airframe maintenance capability includes Airbus A320 and Boeing 737NG C.
- Cabin services, capable of transit, turnaround & overnight flight cabin clean; cabin provisioning and inventory management; aircraft exterior wash and waxing services; cabin deep groom and deep clean; passenger left-behind item control and monitoring; aircraft detailing and metal brightening services.
- Ground support equipment services, include potable water trucks, lavatory servicing trucks, aircraft tow tractors, ground power units, air conditioning unit, air start units, and other maintenance equipment such as high-lift platforms and cherry pickers.
- Training services, include human factors training, aircraft type general familiarization, safety management system, B737-600/700/800/900 Mechanical (B1) and Avionics (B2), A320 series Mechanical (B1) and Avionics (B2), A330 Mechanical (B1) and Avionics (B2).
