= Hong Kong Airways =

Flag carrier of British Hong Kong

- Hong Kong Airways logo
- Commenced operations: 1947
- Ceased operations: 1959
- Operating bases: Kai Tak Airport
- Fleet size: 4
- Destinations: 8
- Parent company: British Overseas Airways Corporation (1947 – 30 November 1949); Jardine Matheson & Co. (1947–1959, sole ownership after 1949)
- Headquarters: British Hong Kong

Hong Kong Airways
- Traditional Chinese: 香港航空
- Simplified Chinese: 香港航空
- Jyutping: Hoeng1 gong2 hong4 hung1
Transcriptions
Standard Mandarin
- Hanyu Pinyin: Xiānggǎng Hángkōng
Yue: Cantonese
- Yale Romanization: Hēung góng hòhng hūng
- Jyutping: Hoeng1 gong2 hong4 hung1

Hong Kong Airways (HKA) was the flag carrier of British Hong Kong during the late 1940s and 1950s.

== Context of launch ==
In 1946, Jardine Air Maintenance Company (JAMCo) had been formed to serve the rapidly expanding portfolio of airlines serving Hong Kong, and Jardine Airways was formed as the general sales agent of BOAC and other carriers in Hong Kong and China. HKA was formed in 1947 by BOAC and Jardine Matheson & Co. (怡和). Jardines wanted to develop a Hong Kong carrier with the support of an enterprise backed by the British government. BOAC wanted to create a feeder carrier to transport passengers from their London to Hong Kong service to onward destinations in China and the Far East. Additionally, the British government wanted to develop a new market for British manufactured aircraft. Jardines was the general sales agent of HKA and became the owner before selling to government-backed partner BOAC.

== Fight for air transport services in Hong Kong ==
In May 1949, an agreement was signed by Cathay Pacific (Jock Swire) and BOAC (on behalf of Hong Kong Airways) along Governor Alexander Grantham's lines of route allocation to each party. Cathay secured the valuable routes of Bangkok, Singapore, Haiphong, Saigon, Sandakan, Jesselton, Labuan, and Rangoon (with an extension possible to Calcutta). This left HKA with Canton, Macao, Shanghai and Tientsin, not, after all, Japan.

On 1 December 1949, BOAC sold Hong Kong Airways back to Jardines, but it soon ran for cover to another 'big brother', in a charter association with the American company Northwest Airlines for its Taipei and Tokyo services.

In 1953, the British government attempted to form a single regional airline by bringing about a merger between BOAC, Cathay Pacific, and Hong Kong Airways. This eventually led to Cathay Pacific taking over Hong Kong Airways on 1 July 1959, with BOAC getting 15 per cent of Cathay Pacific's shares and a seat on the Board.

== Legacy ==
On 1 November 1950, JAMco merged with Swire/Cathay Pacific maintenance interests to form HAECO, with Jardines receiving a parcel of HAECO shares, though this gradually waned. HKA itself merged with Cathay Pacific on 1 July 1959. Jardine Airways remained the exclusive General Sales Agent in Hong Kong for British Airways until the year 2000.

Another Jardine affiliate, Eupo Air (歐亞) chartered seats for distribution primarily amongst the Chinese community on British Airways flights on the Hong Kong to London route from 1983 to 2002, a similar partnership to that of HKA and Northwest Airlines in the 1950s.

As of 2013, Jardines' largest aviation interest in Hong Kong is its ground handling business, Jardine Aviation Services. However, Eupo Air still partners with British Airways and Jardine Travel to provide retail agency service, and corporate travel & expense management.

As of 2013, the Swire Group is still the principal shareholder in Cathay Pacific. Dragonair, now owned by Cathay Pacific as Cathay Dragon, was flying some of the routes originally pioneered by HKA until it ceased operations after COVID-19 in 2020

== Fleet ==
Hong Kong Airways operated a fleet of aircraft including:

- 1 Douglas DC-3
- 1 Douglas DC-4
- 2 Vickers Viscount V760D
  - VR-HFI leased from BOAC Associated Companies – sold to Malayan Airways in 1959
  - VR-HFJ leased from BOAC Associated Companies – sold to Malayan Airways in 1959

== Destinations ==
- British Hong Kong
  - Hong Kong – Kai Tak Airport Main hub
- China
  - Guangzhou – Pai Yuen Airport
  - Shanghai – Shanghai Longhua Airport
  - Taipei
- Japan
  - Tokyo - Haneda Airport
- Ryukyu Islands
  - Okinawa - Naha Airport
- Philippines
  - Manila - Nichols Field
- South Korea
  - Seoul - Gimpo International Airport

== Incidents and accidents ==
- On 11 July 1949, a Hong Kong Airways Douglas DC-3 (VR-HDQ) from Hong Kong to Canton, overran the runway during takeoff at Kai Tak Airport and crashed into the water. The aircraft sank after rescue operations. There were 11 occupants on board the aircraft, including three crew and eight passengers, with no fatalities reported.
