= Uni-Top Airlines =

Chinese cargo airline

IATA	ICAO	Call sign
UW	UTP	UNITOP
- Founded: 2009
- Ceased operations: 20 November 2019
- Operating bases: Wuhan Tianhe International Airport
- Fleet size: 9
- Destinations: 9
- Parent company: Uni-Top Industry Co. Ltd.
- Headquarters: Wuhan, China
- Website: unitop-air.com

Uni-Top Airlines Co. Ltd. (Chinese: 友和道通航空) was a cargo airline, based in Wuhan, capital of Hubei province, China. It was a fully owned subsidiary of Uni-top Industrial Corporation from Shenzhen. The airline ceased operations on 20 November 2019 after suffering financial difficulties.

== History ==
The establishment was started with the approval of CAAC in 2007 and the maiden flight was launched successfully in 2011. Uni-Top were due to fly from May 2009 with services to Shenzhen, Dubai, Bishkek, Almaty and Chennai but was postponed, air freight operations finally began in April 2011.

In late 2013 it was announced that EADS EFW, based at Dresden Airport, Germany, will convert 4 plus 3 options ex China Eastern A300-600 beginning in September 2014. On 20 July 2015, the first A300-600 (MSN 763) made its maiden flight after conversion and was delivered on 27 July 2015.

== Destinations ==
The airline operated out of Kunming, Wuhan and Shenzhen to domestic points as well as countries in South Asia and in Europe.

- Bangladesh
  - Dhaka - Shahjalal International Airport
- Belgium
  - Liège - Liège Airport
- India
  - Bangalore - Kempegowda International Airport
  - Chennai - Chennai International Airport
  - Delhi - Indira Gandhi International Airport
  - Kolkata - Netaji Subhash Chandra Bose International Airport
  - Mumbai - Chhatrapati Shivaji Maharaj International Airport
- Luxembourg
  - Luxembourg - Luxembourg Airport
- Malaysia
  - Kuala Lumpur - Kuala Lumpur International Airport
- United Arab Emirates
  - Dubai - Al Maktoum International Airport

On 5 July 2015 a Uni Top 747-200F (B-2462) was commissioned by a private customer to fly 24 elephant calves, captured in the Hwange National Park, from Harare International Airport to Guangzhou Baiyun Airport where the elephants were then delivered to Chimelong Safari Park.

== Fleet ==
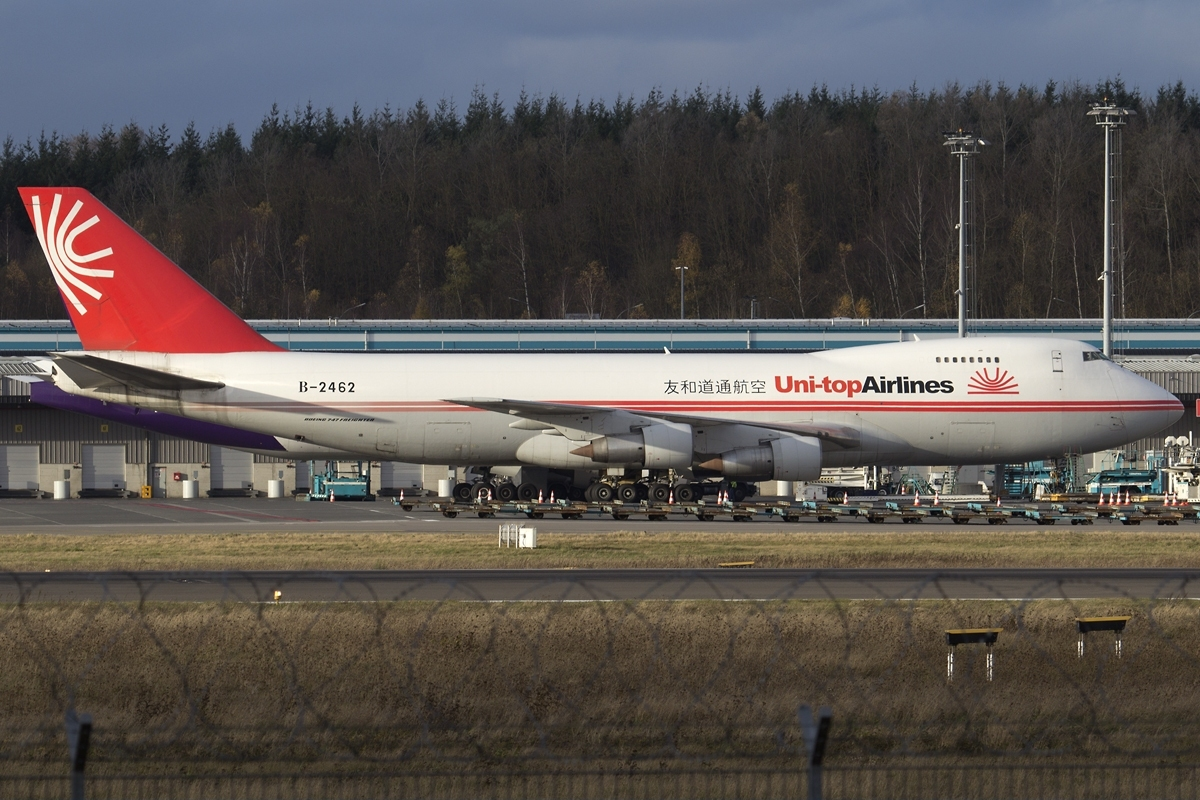
Uni-top Airlines Boeing 747-200F

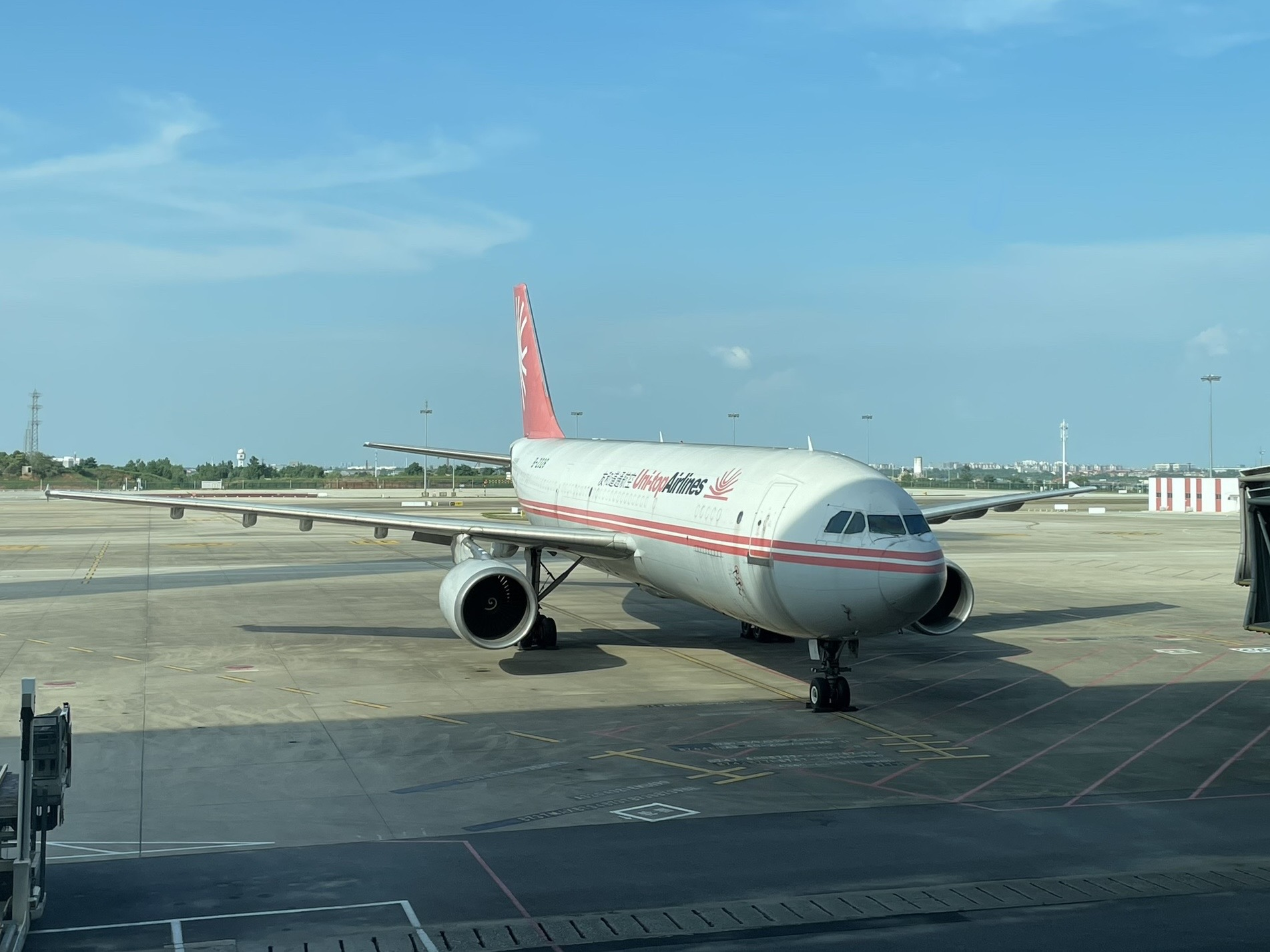
Uni-top Airlines Airbus A300-600RF

As of August 2019, the Uni-top Airlines fleet consisted of the following aircraft:

Uni-top Airlines Fleet
Aircraft	In service	Orders	Passengers	Notes
Airbus A300-600R	1	—		Currently stored and to be converted into freighter
Airbus A300-600RF	6	—	Cargo	
Boeing 747-200F	1	—	Cargo	Stored
Boeing 747-400BDSF	1	—	Cargo	
Total	9			
