= Air China Cargo =

Chinese cargo airline

Air China Cargo 中国国际货运航空公司

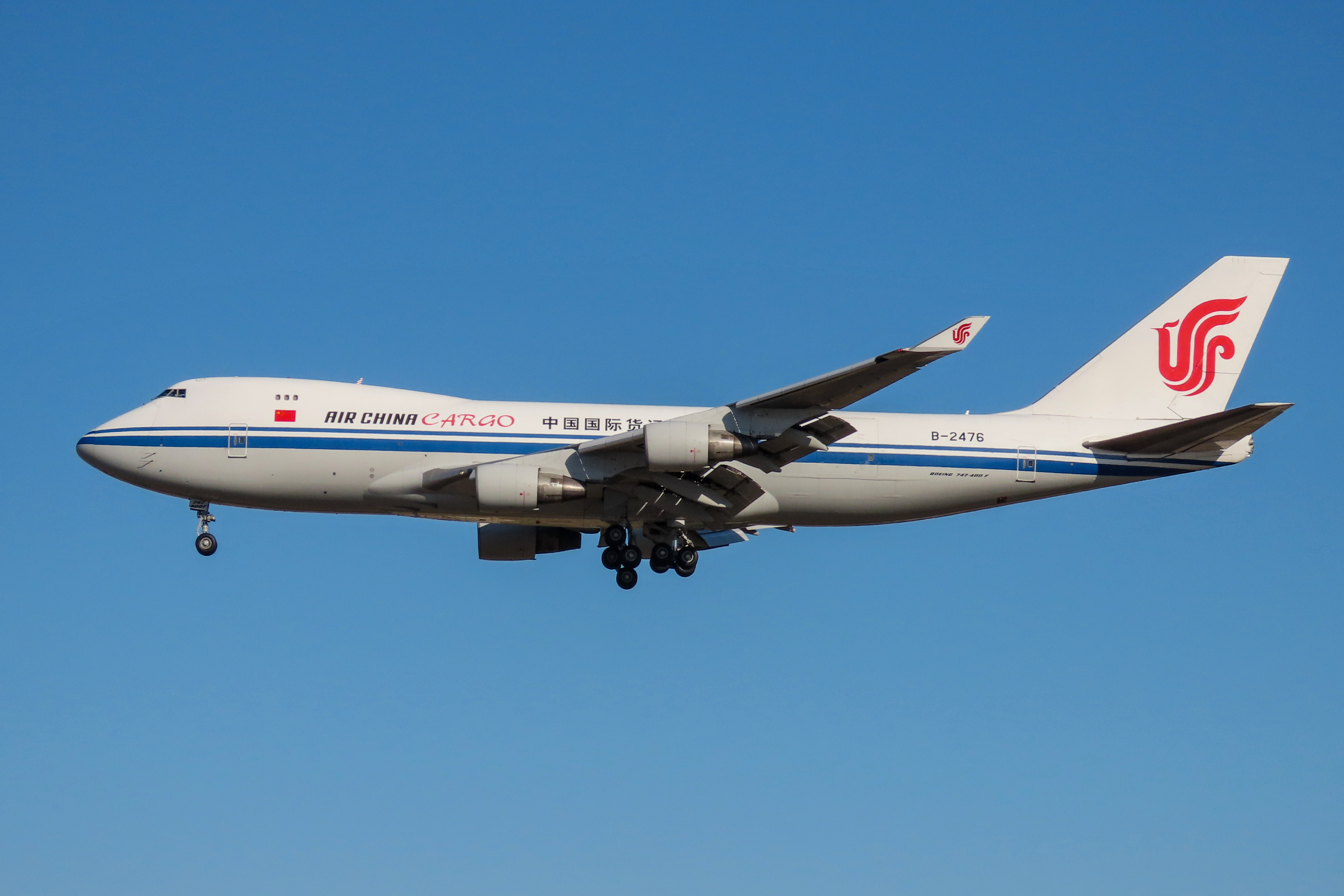
- Air China Cargo 747-4FTF in standard livery
IATA	ICAO	Call sign
CA	CAO	AIR CHINA FREIGHT
- Founded: 2003; 23 years ago
- Hubs: Beijing–Capital; Guangzhou; Shanghai–Pudong
- Fleet size: 20
- Destinations: 26
- Parent company: Air China (51%); Cathay Pacific (49%)
- Traded as: SZSE: 001391
- Headquarters: Beijing Tianzhu Airport Industrial Zone, Shunyi District, Beijing, China
- Website: www.airchinacargo.com/en

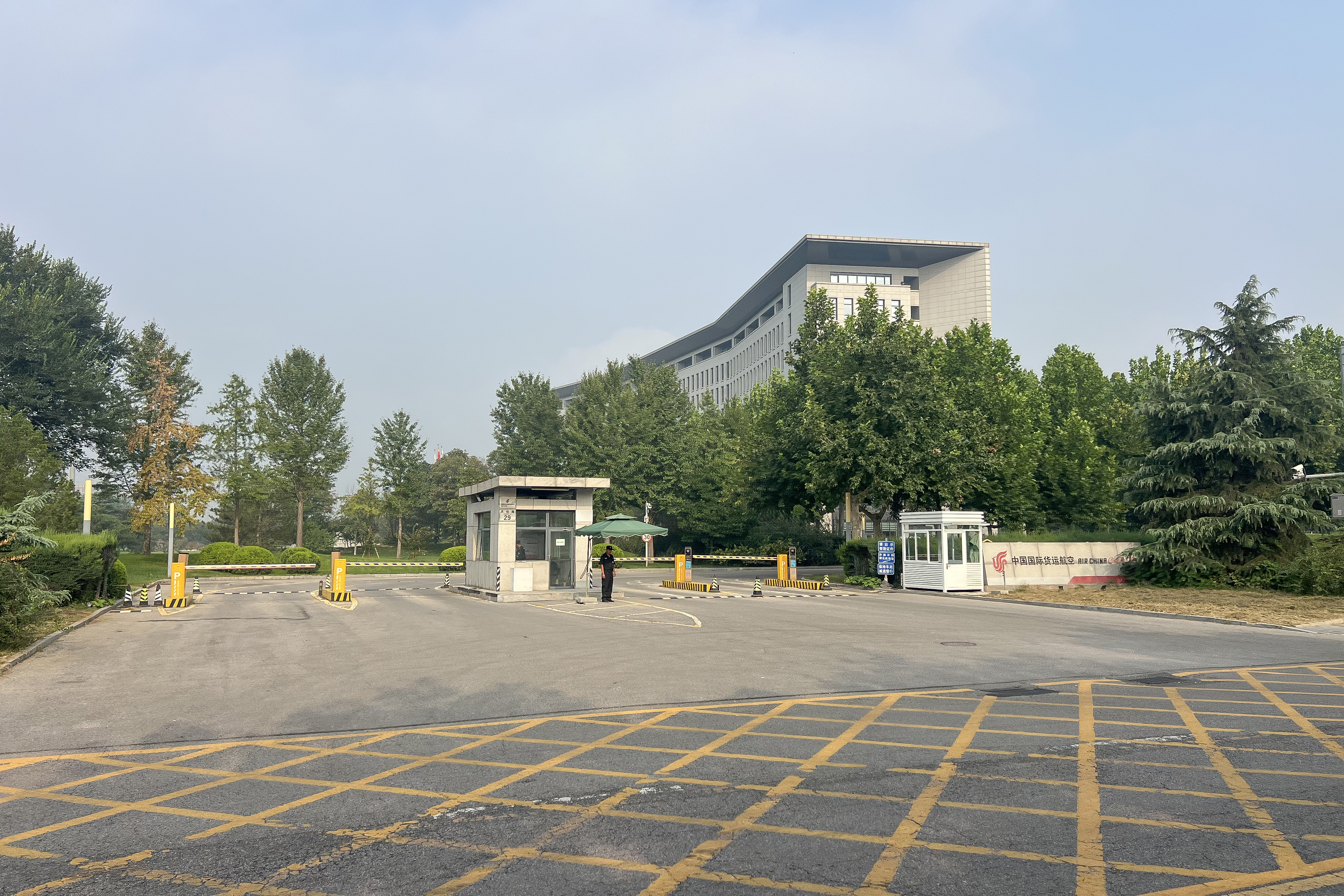
Air China Cargo headquarters

Air China Cargo Co., Ltd. (Chinese: 中国国际货运航空公司) is a cargo airline of the People's Republic of China with its headquarters in Shunyi District in Beijing. It is an all-cargo subsidiary of Air China and operates scheduled freighter services to over 20 cities in 12 countries around the world. Its main base is Beijing Capital International Airport.

== History ==
The airline was established in 2003 and started operations shortly thereafter. It is owned by Air China (51%), CITIC Pacific (25%) and Beijing Capital International (24%) and has around 4,000 employees (as of March 2013).

In May 2011, Air China and Cathay Pacific announced the consolidation of their cargo business to the new Air China Cargo.

On 30 December 2024, Air China Cargo went public through an initial public offering on the Shenzhen Stock Exchange, which became the biggest IPO of Chinese A-share market in 2024.

== Destinations ==
Air China Cargo serves the following airports as of June 2025:

Country	City	Airport	Notes	Ref(s)
Belgium	Liège	Liège Airport		
China	Beijing	Beijing Capital International Airport	Hub	
China	Chengdu	Chengdu Shuangliu International Airport		
China	Chongqing	Chongqing Jiangbei International Airport		
China	Shanghai	Shanghai Hongqiao International Airport		
China	Shanghai	Shanghai Pudong International Airport	Hub	
China	Tianjin	Tianjin Binhai International Airport		
China	Zhengzhou	Zhengzhou Xinzheng International Airport		
Hong Kong	Hong Kong	Hong Kong International Airport		
Japan	Osaka	Kansai International Airport		
Japan	Tokyo	Haneda Airport		
Japan	Tokyo	Narita International Airport	Hub	
Denmark	Copenhagen	Copenhagen Airport		
France	Paris	Charles de Gaulle Airport		
Germany	Frankfurt	Frankfurt Airport		
Germany	Munich	Munich Airport		
Hungary	Budapest	Budapest Ferenc Liszt International Airport		
Netherlands	Amsterdam	Amsterdam Airport Schiphol		
Russia	Novosibirsk	Tolmachevo Airport		
Spain	Zaragoza	Zaragoza Airport		
Sweden	Stockholm	Stockholm Arlanda Airport		
Taiwan	Taipei	Songshan Airport		
Taiwan	Taipei	Taoyuan International Airport		
United Kingdom	Prestwick	Glasgow Prestwick Airport		
United States	Anchorage	Ted Stevens Anchorage International Airport		
United States	Chicago	O'Hare International Airport		
United States	Dallas	Dallas Fort Worth International Airport		
United States	Los Angeles	Los Angeles International Airport		
United States	New York City	John F. Kennedy International Airport		

== Fleet ==
=== Current fleet ===
As of October 2025, Air China Cargo operates the following aircraft:

Air China Cargo fleet
Aircraft	In service	Orders	Notes
Airbus A330-200/P2F	8	—	Delivery completed in January 2026; Converted from Air China passenger aircraft.
Airbus A350F	—	10	Deliveries from 2029 until 2031. Order with 4 options were firmed May 2026.
Boeing 747-400F	3	—	
Boeing 777F	12	—	
Total	23	10	

It is reported Air China Cargo is selling its oldest 747-400 freighter.

=== Retired fleet ===
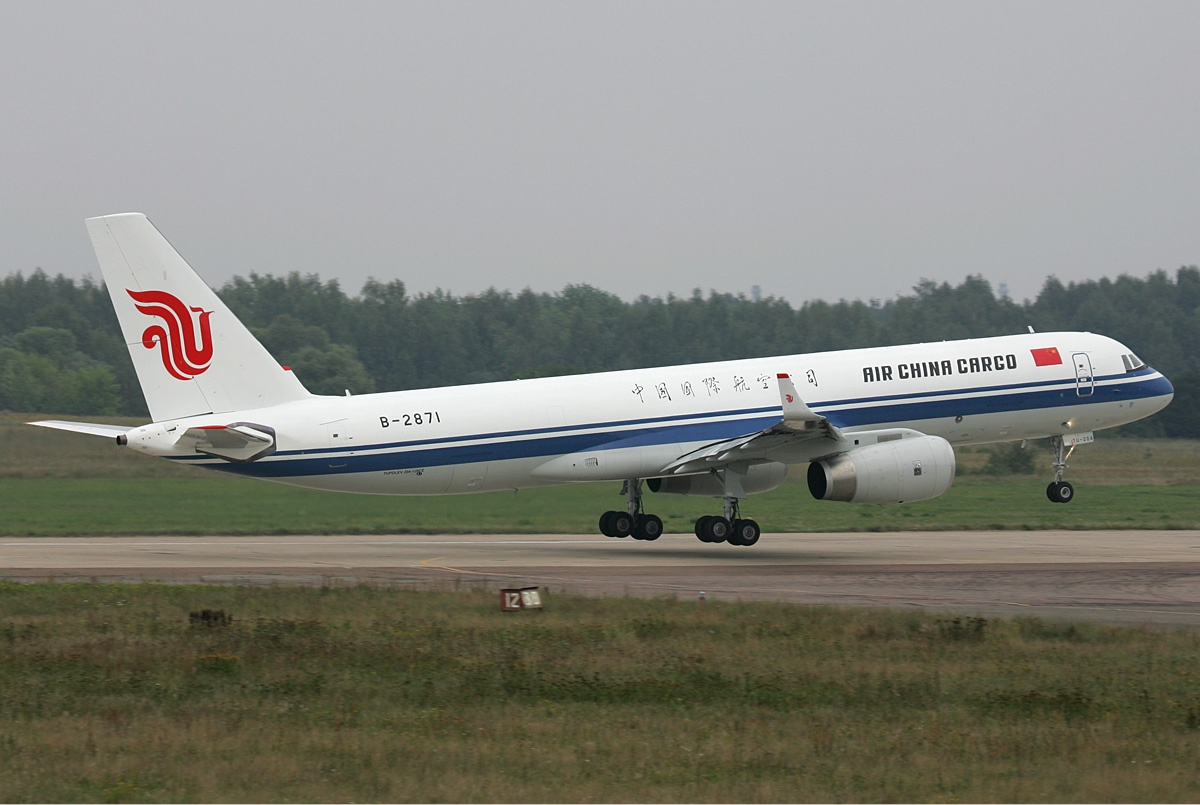
Air China Cargo Tu-204-120CE which was later converted to a tanker

The Air China Cargo retired fleet consists of the following freighter aircraft:

Air China Cargo retired fleet
Aircraft	Total	Introduced	Retired	Notes
Boeing 747-200F	1	1990	2011	Sold to Uni-Top Airlines.
Boeing 747-200SF	3	1997	2010	Sold to MK Airlines and Uni-Top Airlines.
Boeing 747-400BCF	6	2009	2014	
Boeing 747-400BDSF	2	2006	2014	Sold to ACT Airlines.
Boeing 757-200PCF	4	2013	2023	
Tupolev Tu-204-120CE	1	2008	2011	Converted to a tanker.

== See also ==
- Air China
- Cathay Pacific
- China Postal Airlines
