= Sichuan Airlines =

Chinese airline, headquartered in Chengdu, Sichuan

Sichuan Airlines 四川航空

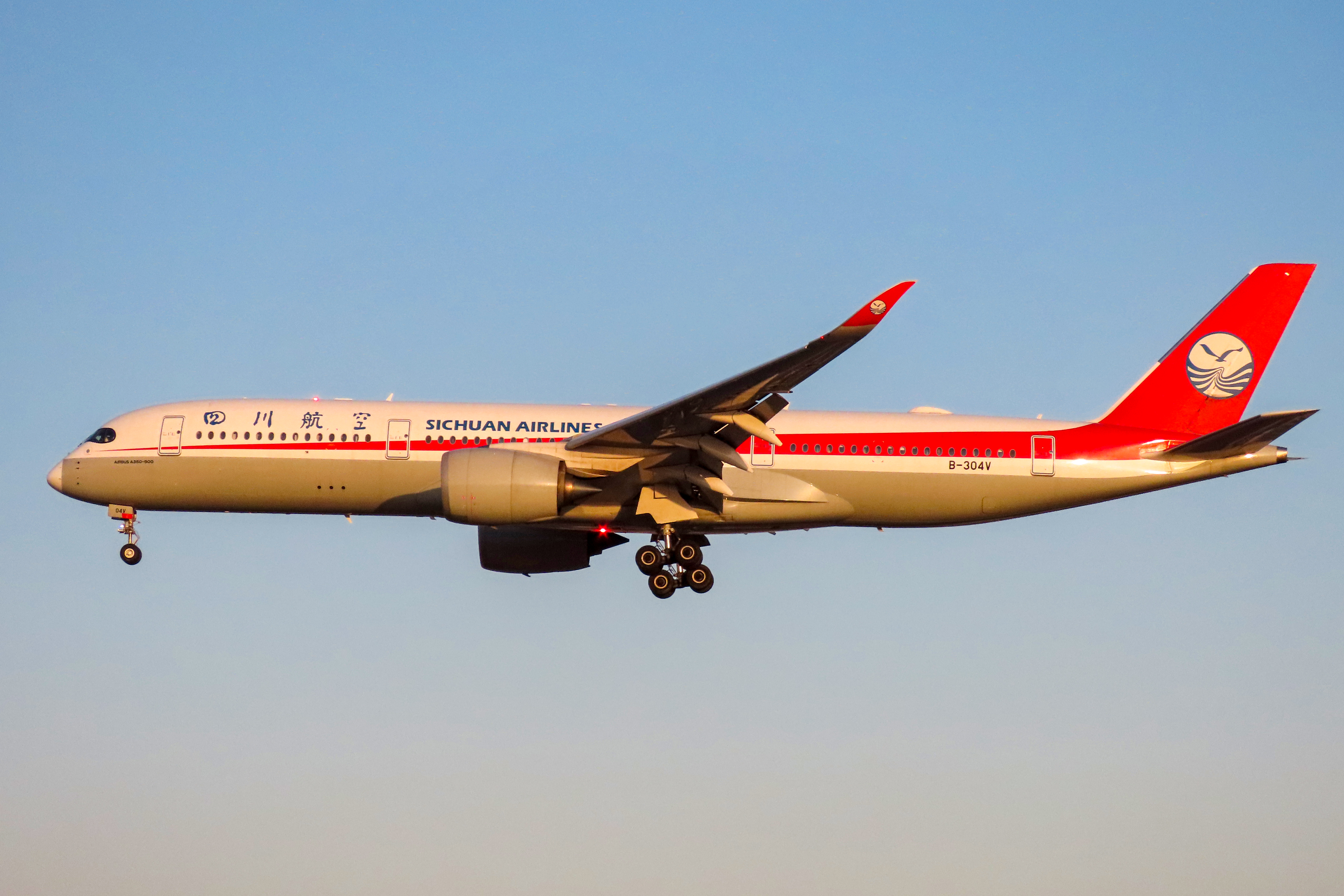
- Sichuan Airlines Airbus A350-900
IATA	ICAO	Call sign
3U	CSC	SICHUAN
- Founded: 19 September 1986; 40 years ago
- Commenced operations: 14 July 1988; 38 years ago
- Hubs: Chengdu–Shuangliu; Chengdu–Tianfu; Chongqing; Kunming
- Focus cities: Beijing–Capital; Harbin; Hangzhou; Lhasa; Nanning; Sanya; Xi'an
- Frequent-flyer program: Golden Panda
- Subsidiaries: Chengdu Airlines; Sichuan Airlines Logistics; Sichuan Aircraft Maintenance Engineering (73.04%)
- Fleet size: 213
- Destinations: 151
- Parent company: Sichuan Airlines Co., Ltd. Group (40%); China Southern Airlines (39%); China Eastern Airlines (10%); Air China (10%); Chengdu Gingko Restaurant Co. (1%)
- Headquarters: Chengdu Shuangliu International Airport, Chengdu, Sichuan
- Key people: Yue LI (CEO)
- Employees: more than 6,000
- Website: sichuanair.com global.sichuanair.com

Sichuan Airlines Co., Ltd.
- Chinese: 四川航空股份公司
Transcriptions
Standard Mandarin
- Hanyu Pinyin: Sìchuān hángkōng gǔfèn gōngsī
other Mandarin
- Sichuanese Pinyin: Sìcuān hángkōn gǔfèn gōnsī

Abbreviation
- Chinese: 川航
Transcriptions
Standard Mandarin
- Hanyu Pinyin: Chuān Háng
other Mandarin
- Sichuanese Pinyin: Cuān Háng

Sichuan Airlines is the largest airline in Western China, headquartered in Chengdu, Sichuan, China.

The airline is based in Chengdu, operating mainly scheduled domestic and international flights out of Chengdu Shuangliu Airport, Chengdu Tianfu International Airport, Chongqing Jiangbei International Airport and Kunming Changshui International Airport. Sichuan Airlines is also the first airline in mainland China to operate the Airbus A320 and among the first batch of airlines in mainland China to operate the Airbus A350.

== History ==
Sichuan Airlines was established on 19 September 1986 as Sichuan Airlines Company, operating its first flight on 14 July 1988 between Chengdu and Wanzhou.

The airline was later restructured as Sichuan Airlines Co., Ltd. on 29 August 2002, in which the Sichuan Airlines Co., Ltd. Group became the largest shareholder (40%). The other shareholders are China Southern Airlines (39%), China Eastern Airlines (10%), Air China Group (10%) and Chengdu Gingko Restaurant Co. (1%).

In 2018, the airline was the 42nd largest airline group in the world ranked by traffic.

== Corporate affairs ==
=== Operations ===
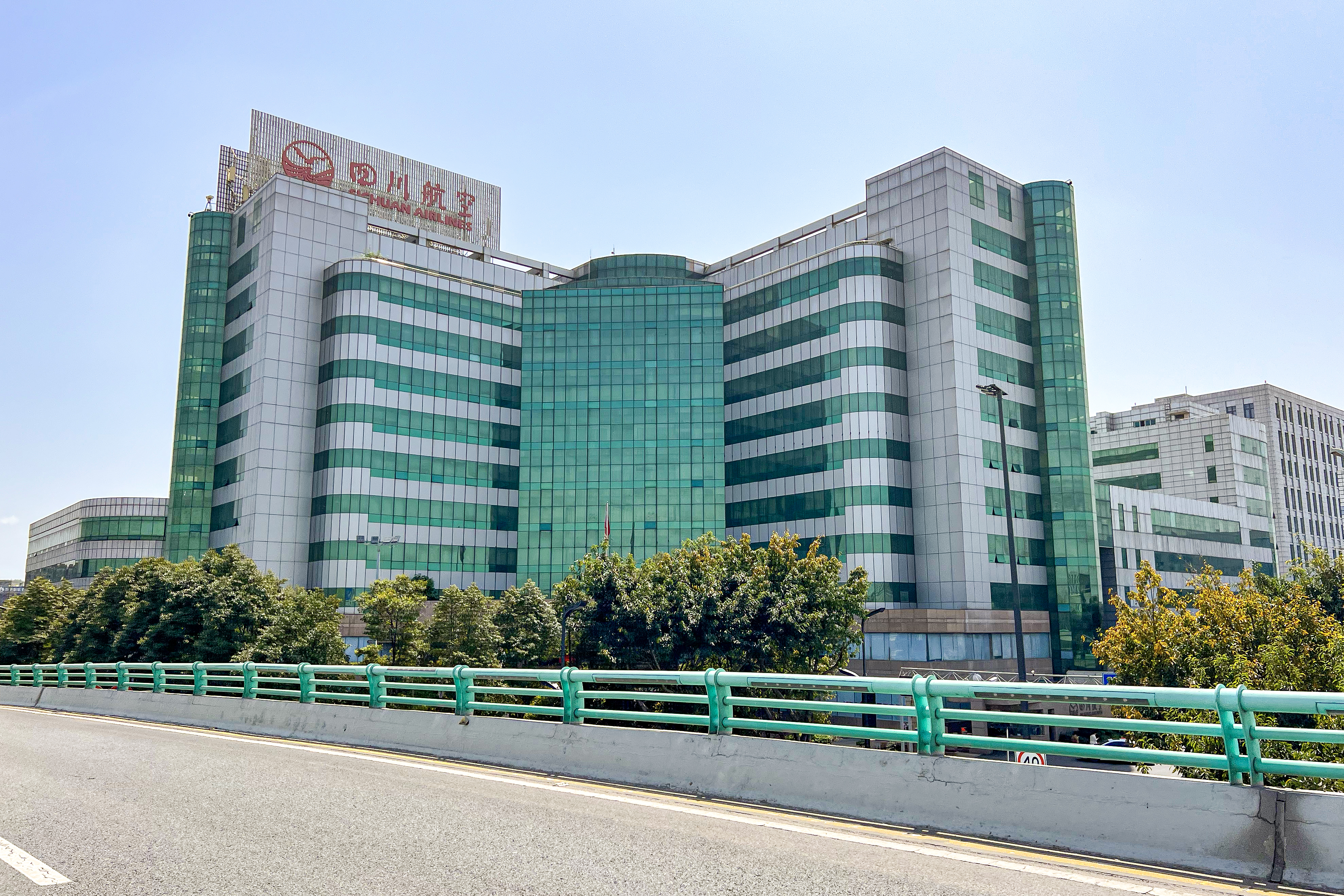
Headquarters

Sichuan Airlines' corporate headquarters are located in its hub at Chengdu Shuangliu International Airport in Shuangliu District, Chengdu, Sichuan.

=== Subsidiary ===
Sichuan Airlines owns Chengdu Airlines, which also has its hub at Chengdu Shuangliu International Airport. Previously known as United Eagle Airlines, the airline was renamed to Chengdu Airlines to help lift the image of Chengdu on behalf of the city's government, according to an anonymous official of Sichuan Airlines. In late 2009, Sichuan Airlines sold some of its share of Chengdu Airlines to aircraft manufacturer Comac and the Chengdu Communications Investment Group. Chengdu Airlines was the first operator of the Comac ARJ21.

=== Branding ===
Sichuan Airlines' logo is a haiyan (海燕) that is soaring with high temperament, symbolizing the company's entrepreneurial spirit. The circle represents the earth and the four wave patterns represents a hundred rivers going into the sea and carrying back virtues, corresponding to the core values of Sichuan Airlines' "truthfulness, goodness, beauty, love", symbolizing that Sichuan Airlines takes off from the inland and connects the stability of land civilization and the outward development of marine civilization.

In addition to the logo, Sichuan Airlines gives emphasis to the Chinese character "川" in which not only the character means river or a shortened name of Sichuan, but also that the character is defined as running through and gathering. It means that Sichuan Airlines is engaged in aviation flight and has built a world-class fleet that connects five continents, improving its network radiation capability and opening more international routes to build a bridge between Western China and the world and to integrate the world's corporate vision.

Sichuan Airlines Xian Y-7 in 1991, wearing the airline's original livery

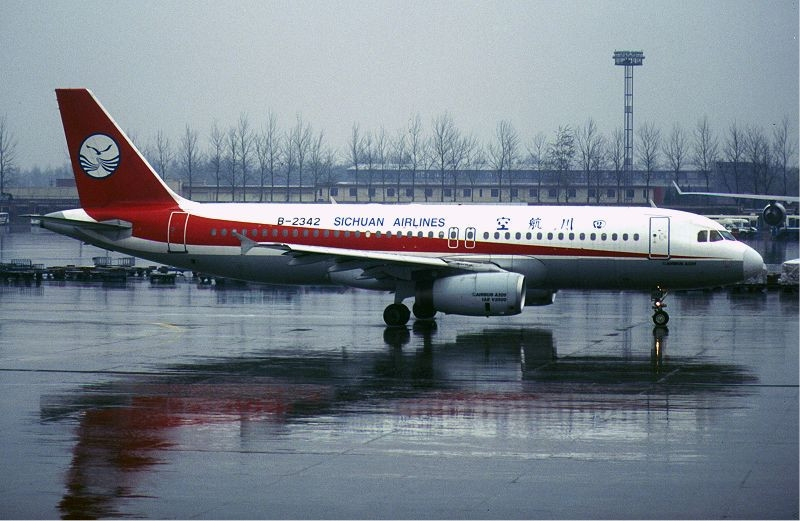
Sichuan Airlines Airbus A320-200 in 1997, wearing the airline's current livery

== Destinations ==
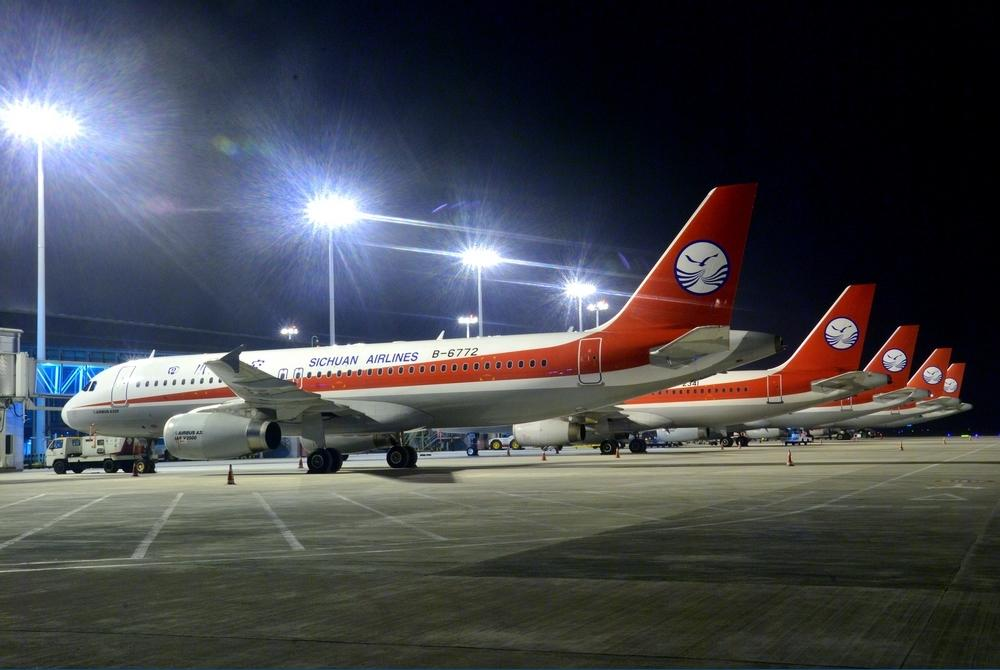
Sichuan Airlines line-up at their Chongqing hub in 2011

Sichuan Airlines mainly operates flights in East Asia, though other destinations include cities in Australia, New Zealand, Africa, Western Asia, Southeast Asia, Europe, and North America.

The airline launched its first long-haul overseas route in June 2012 with flights from its Chengdu hub to Vancouver, Canada. Its second long-haul flight, from Chengdu to Melbourne, Australia, was launched in February 2013 with three weekly services. On 17 October 2016 the airline launched twice-a-week service from Chengdu via Hangzhou to Los Angeles (LAX). In 2016, Sichuan Airlines started twice-a-week flights to its first European destination, Prague. On 23 June 2018, Sichuan Airlines launched service from Chengdu to Zurich via Prague. It was the first fifth freedom flight for the airline. It was also the only airline operating this route with Airbus A330 wide-body aircraft.

=== Codeshare agreements ===
Sichuan Airlines has codeshare agreements with the following airlines:

- Air China
- Chengdu Airlines (Subsidiary)
- China Eastern Airlines
- China Express Airlines
- China Southern Airlines
- Juneyao Air
- Kunming Airlines
- Shandong Airlines
- Shanghai Airlines
- Shenzhen Airlines
- Tibet Airlines
- Turkish Airlines
- XiamenAir

== Fleet ==
=== Current fleet ===
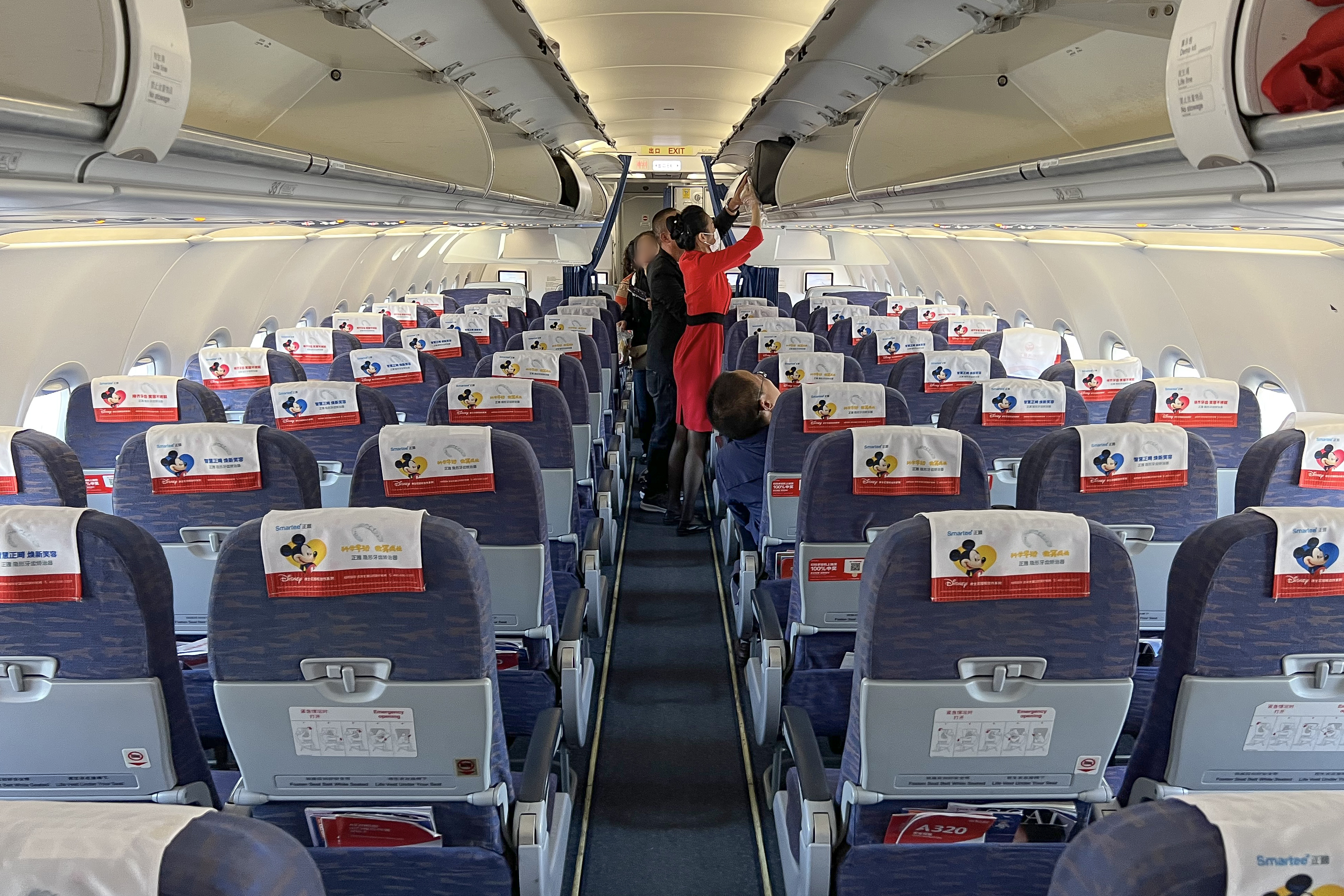
Airbus A320-200 economy class cabin

As of October 2025, Sichuan Airlines operates an all-Airbus fleet composed of the following aircraft:

Sichuan Airlines fleet
Aircraft	In service	Orders	Passengers			Notes
Aircraft	In service	Orders	J	Y	Total	Notes
Airbus A319-100	18	—	8	124	132	
Airbus A320-200	55	—	8	150	158	B-6388 in Chinese Dragon livery. B-6719 in Yunnan livery.
Airbus A320-200	55	—	8	156	164	B-6388 in Chinese Dragon livery. B-6719 in Yunnan livery.
Airbus A320neo	38	3	8	150	158	
Airbus A320neo	38	3	—	180	180	
Airbus A321-200	46	—	12	177	189	B-1663 in "100th Aircraft" livery.
Airbus A321-200	46	—	8	186	194	B-1663 in "100th Aircraft" livery.
Airbus A321neo	21	3	8	190	198	
Airbus A321neo	21	3	8	193	201	
Airbus A321LR	6	—	8	193	201	Operating direct flights to Male from Chengdu.
Airbus A330-200	4	—	24	250	274	One aircraft painted in Panda livery.
Airbus A330-300	7	—	36	265	301	B-5923 and B-5929 in "Wuliangye" livery. B-5945 in 2021 Summer Universiade livery.
Airbus A330-300	7	—	24	281	305	B-5923 and B-5929 in "Wuliangye" livery. B-5945 in 2021 Summer Universiade livery.
Airbus A350-900	9	3	28	303	331	B-325J and B-306N in Panda Route livery. B-304V and B-304U in Chengdu FISU World University Games livery. B-301D in Panda livery.
Comac C919	—	20	TBA			
Sichuan Airlines Cargo fleet
Airbus A321-200/P2F	4	—	Cargo			
Airbus A330-200F	3	—	Cargo			
Airbus A330-300/P2F	2	—	Cargo			Deliveries started in 2022.
Total	213	29				

Sichuan Airlines Airbus A319 in 2014

Sichuan Airlines Airbus A320-200 in 1999

Sichuan Airlines Airbus A320neo in 2019

Sichuan Airlines Airbus A321-200 in 2013

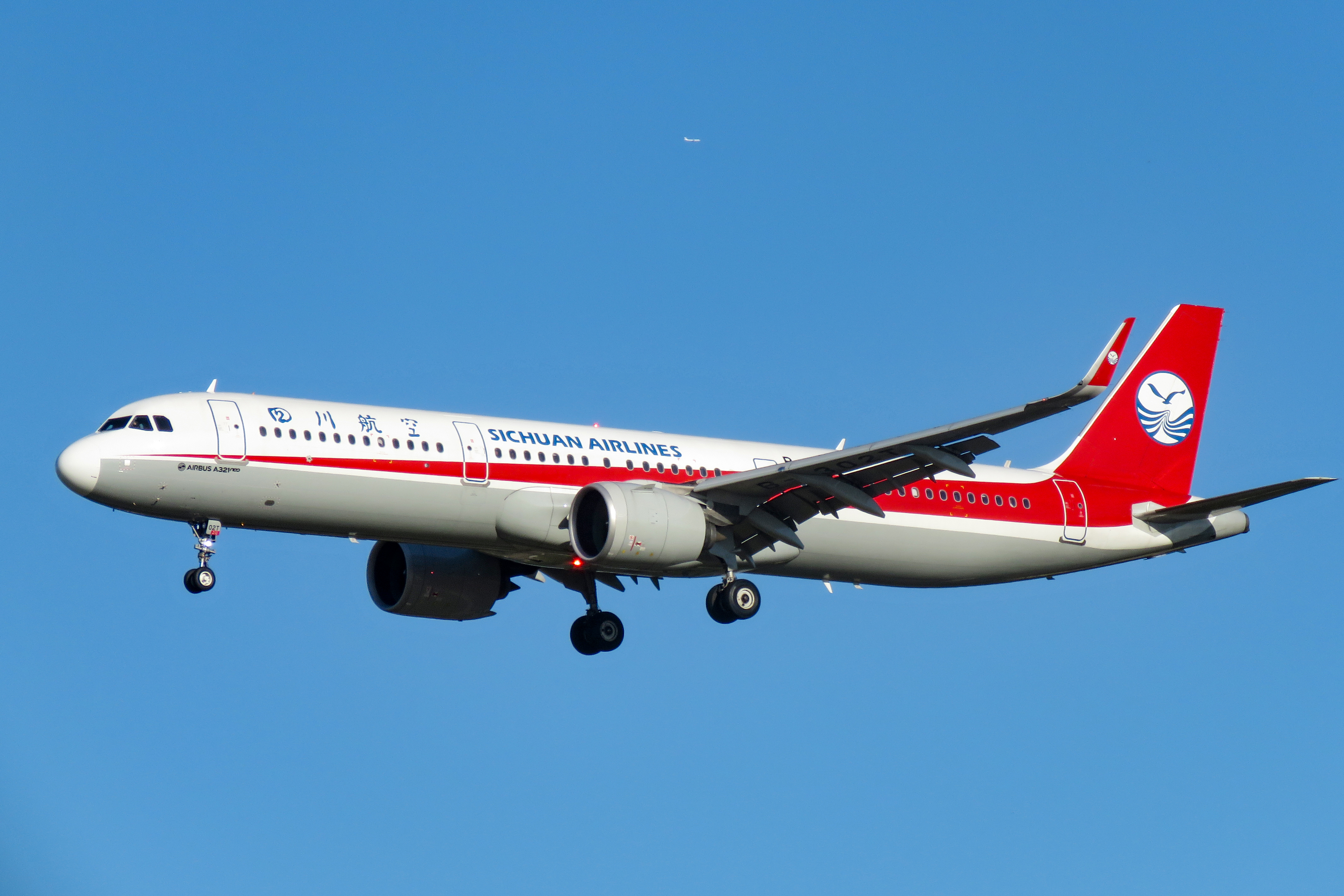
Sichuan Airlines Airbus A321neo in 2019

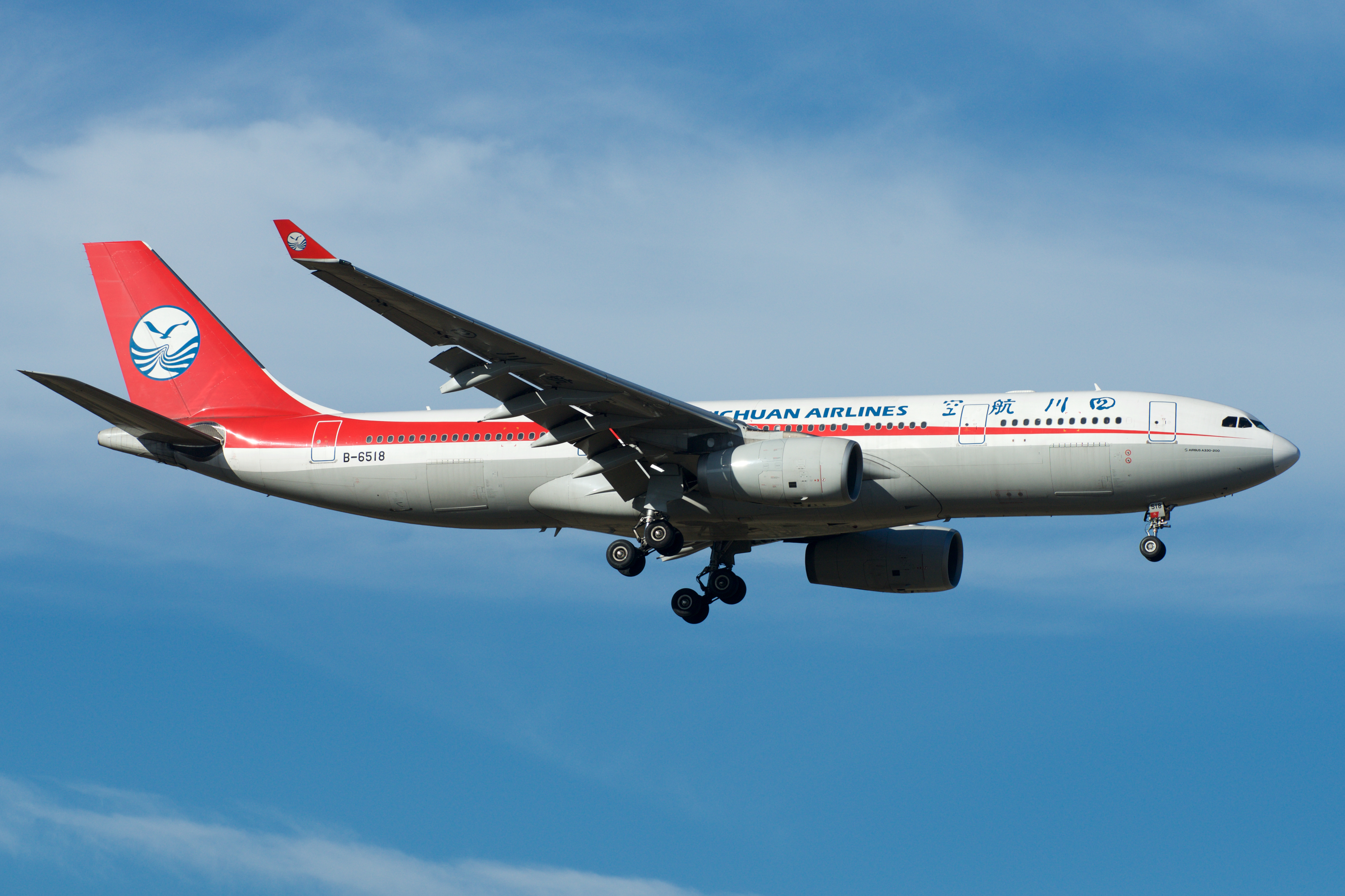
Sichuan Airlines Airbus A330-200 in 2018

Sichuan Airlines Airbus A330-300 in 2013

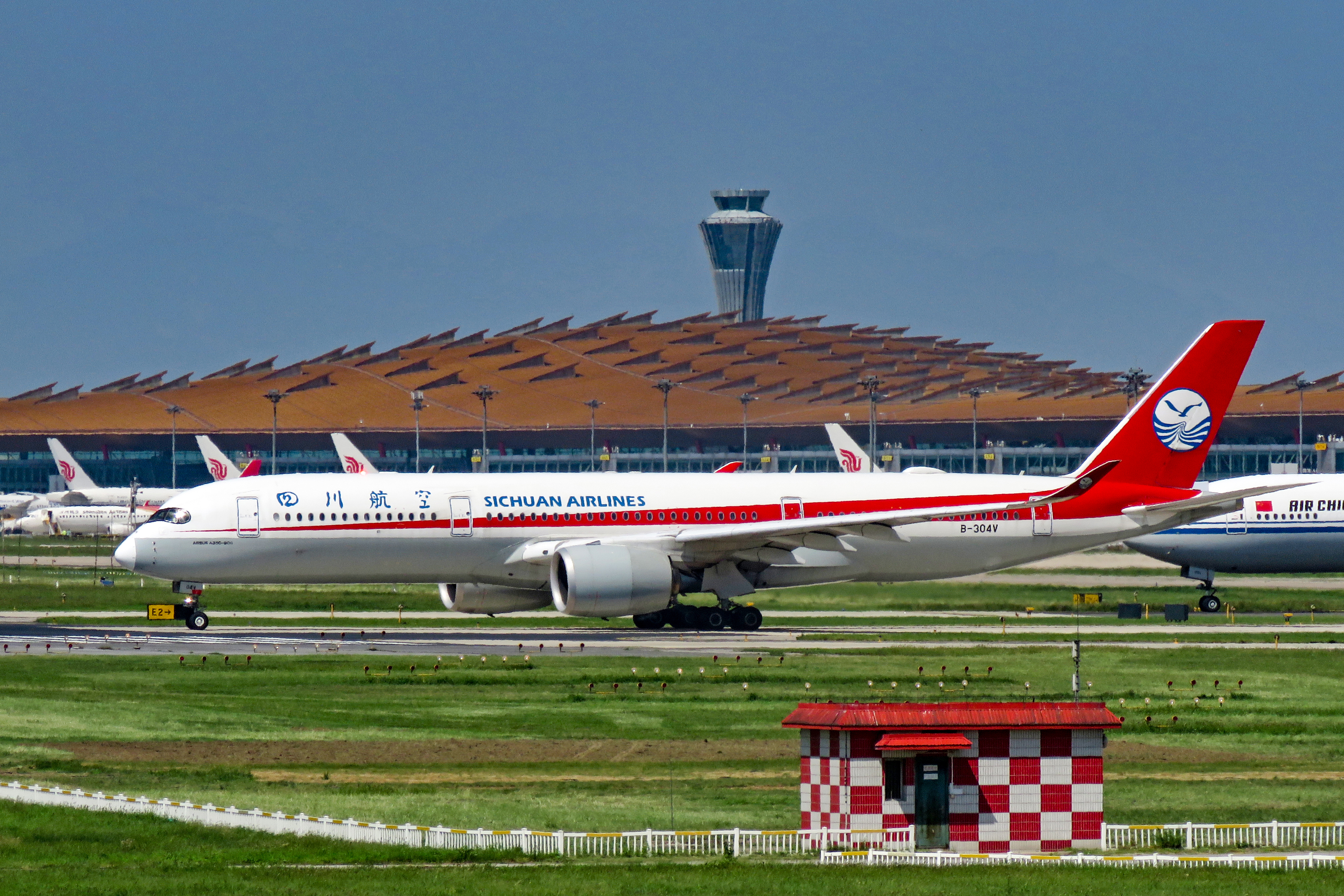
Sichuan Airlines Airbus A350-900 in 2019

=== Special liveries ===
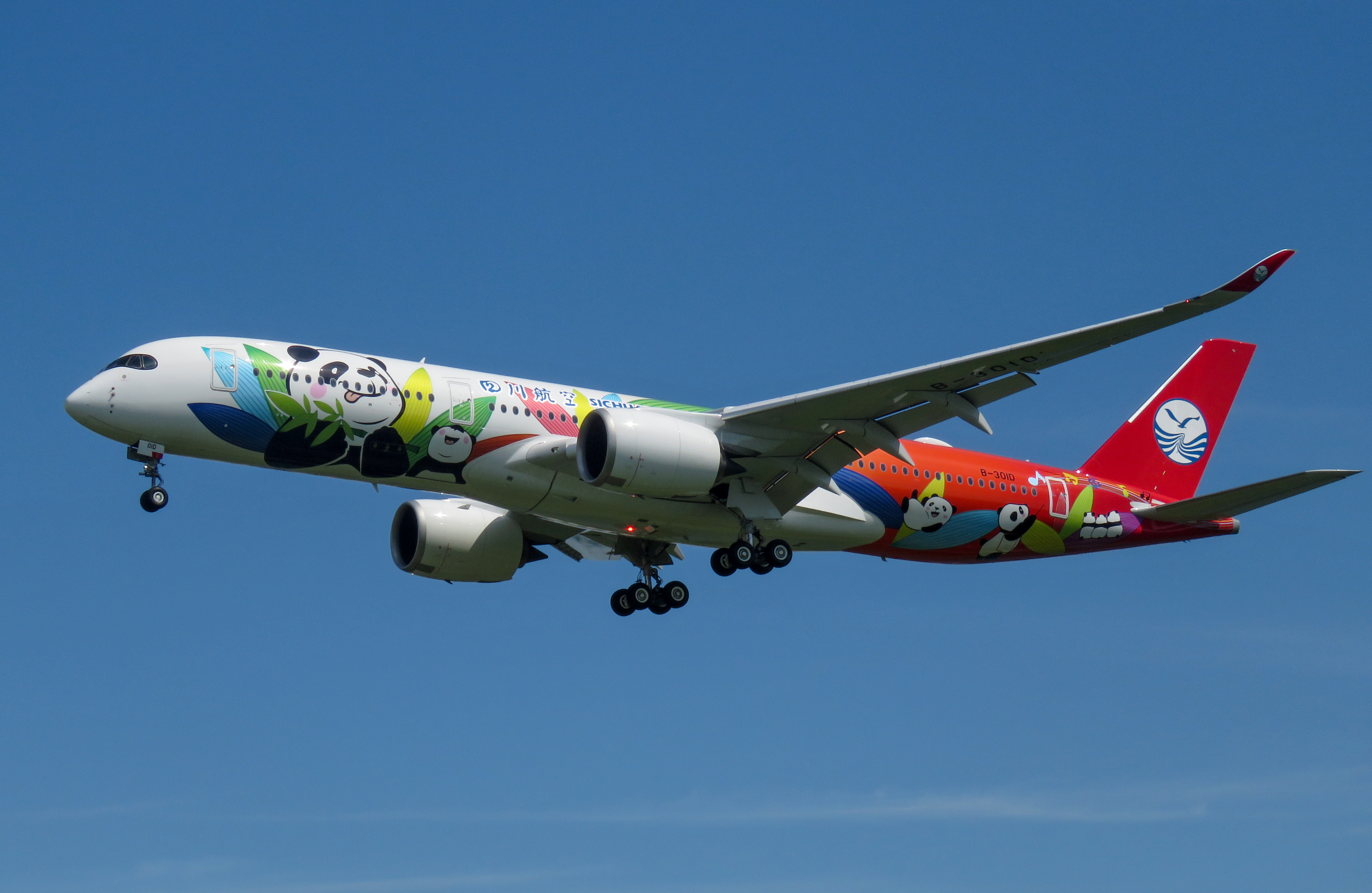
Sichuan Airlines took delivery of their first Airbus A350 XWB in August 2018

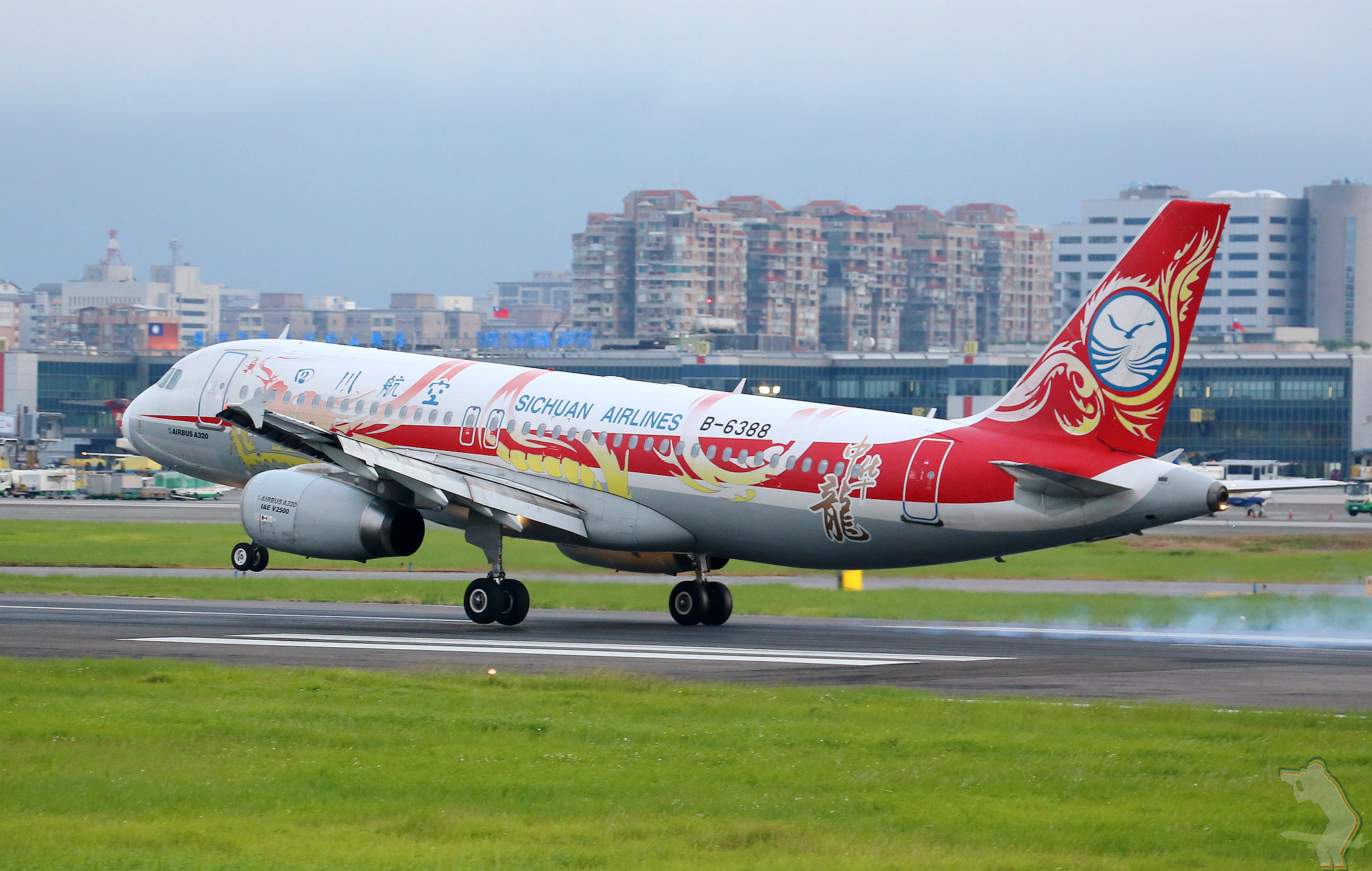
Sichuan Airlines Chinese Dragon Livery

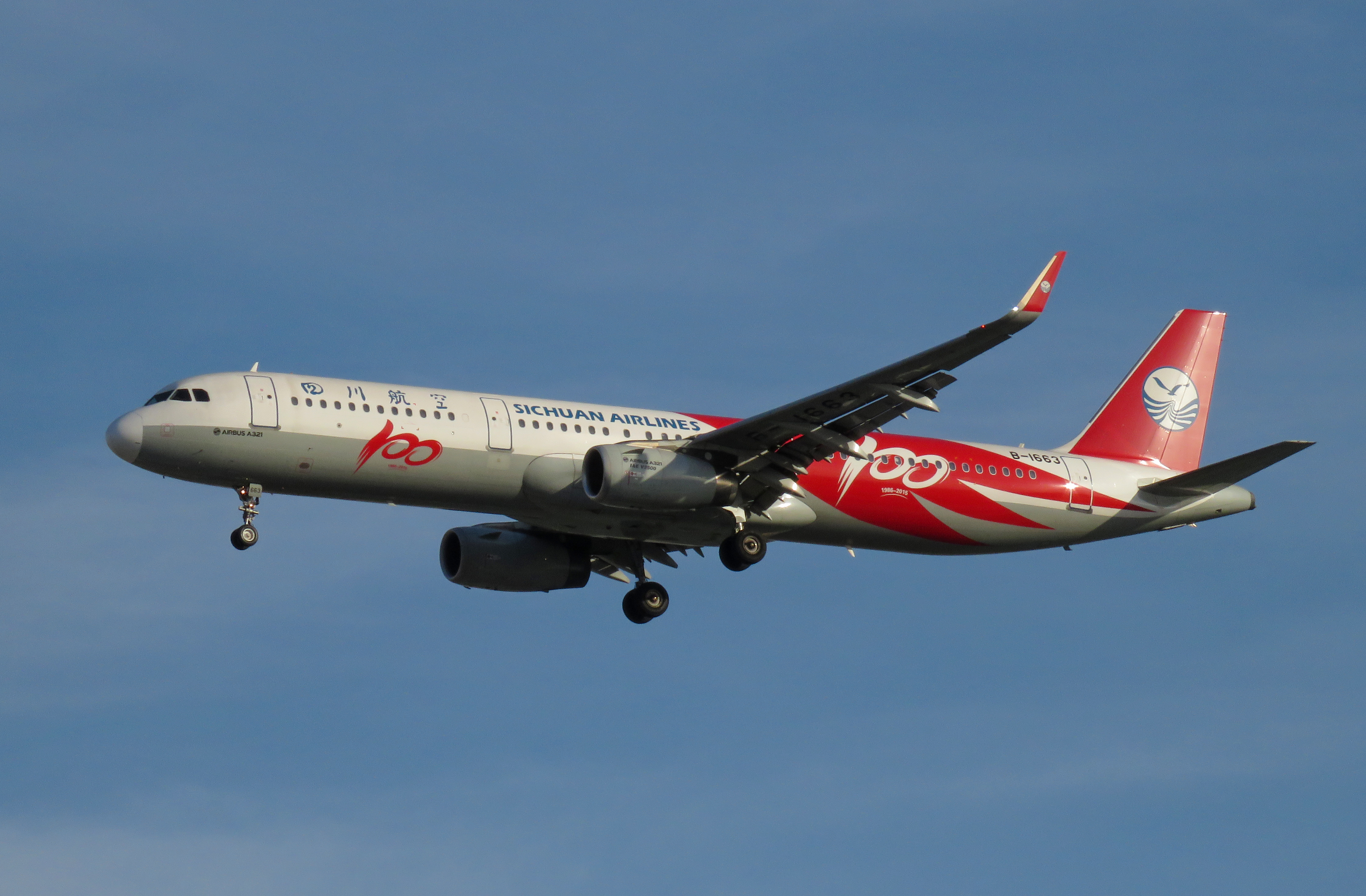
The 100th Sichuan Airlines A321

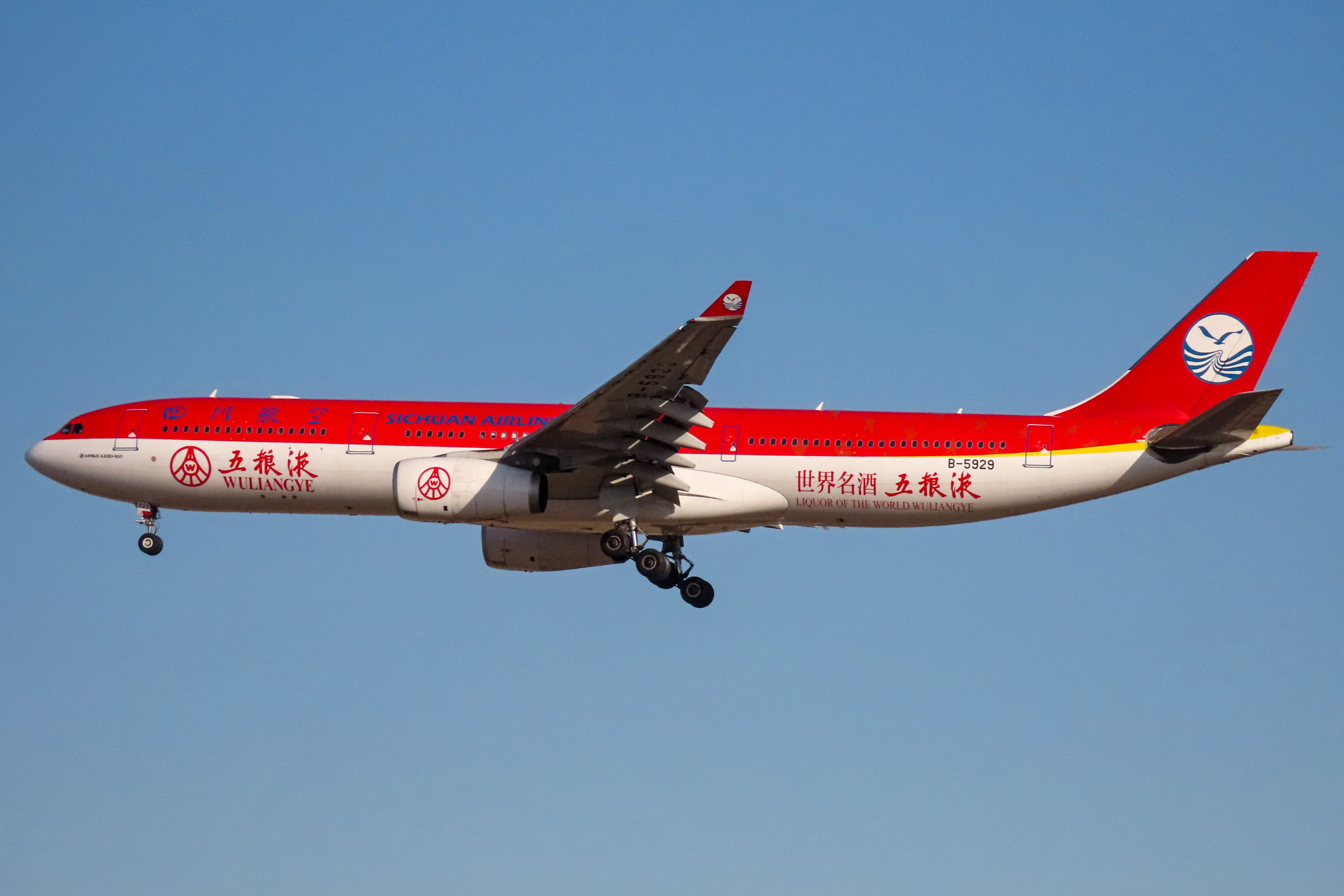
Sichuan Airlines Airbus A330 painted by "Wuliangye"

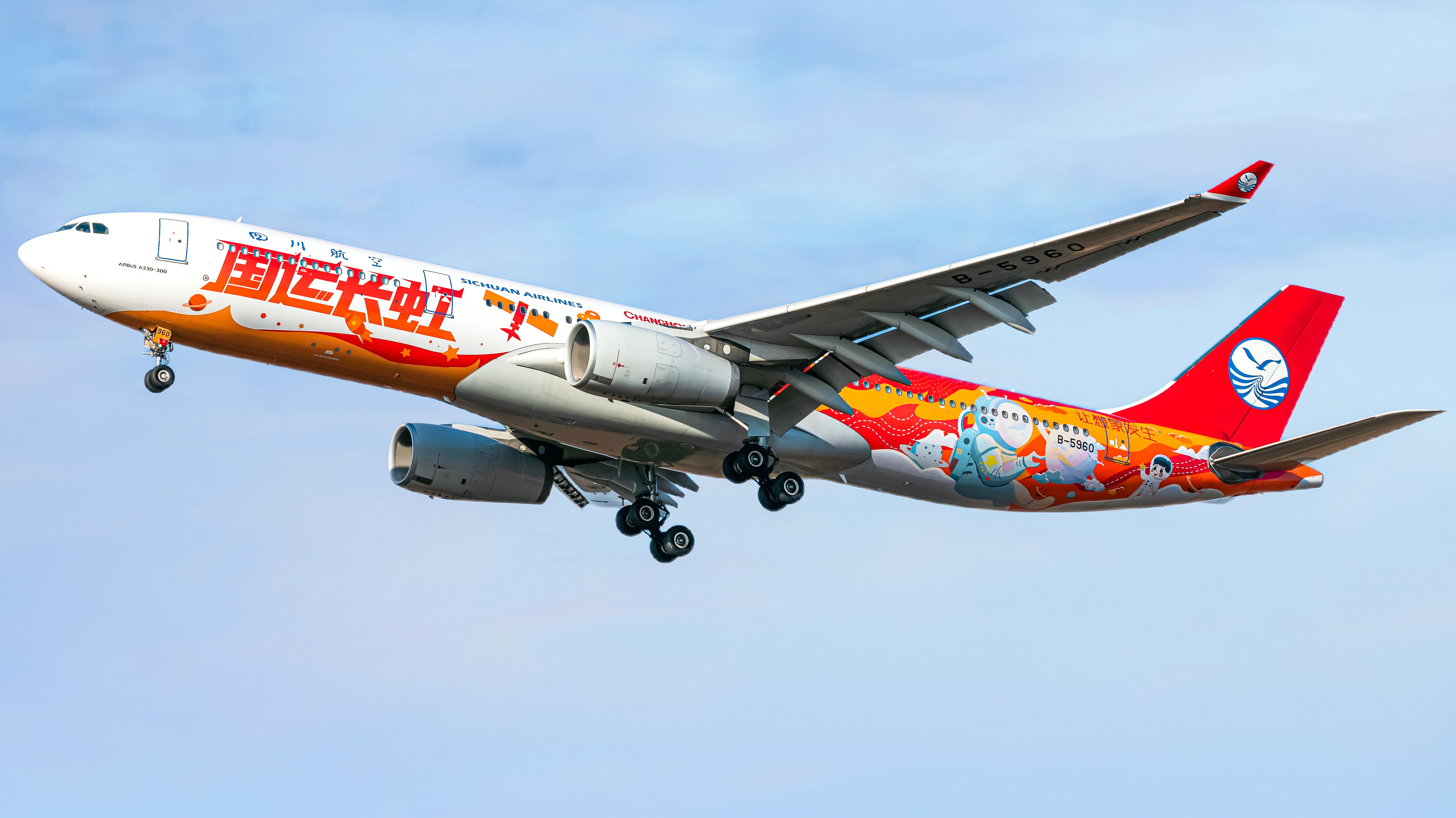
Sichuan Airlines Airbus A330 painted by "Changhong"

Sichuan Airlines Airbus A330 painted by "Sichuan Bank".

=== Former fleet ===
Sichuan Airlines retired fleet
Aircraft	Total	Introduced	Retired	Notes
Airbus A321-100	2	2003	2015	
Antonov An-24	Unknown	Unknown	Unknown	
Boeing 737-300	1	2000	2001	
Embraer ERJ 145	5	2000	2011	
Tupolev Tu-154	6	1992	2001	
Xian MA60	Unknown	Unknown	Unknown	
Xian Y-7	5	1987	2000	

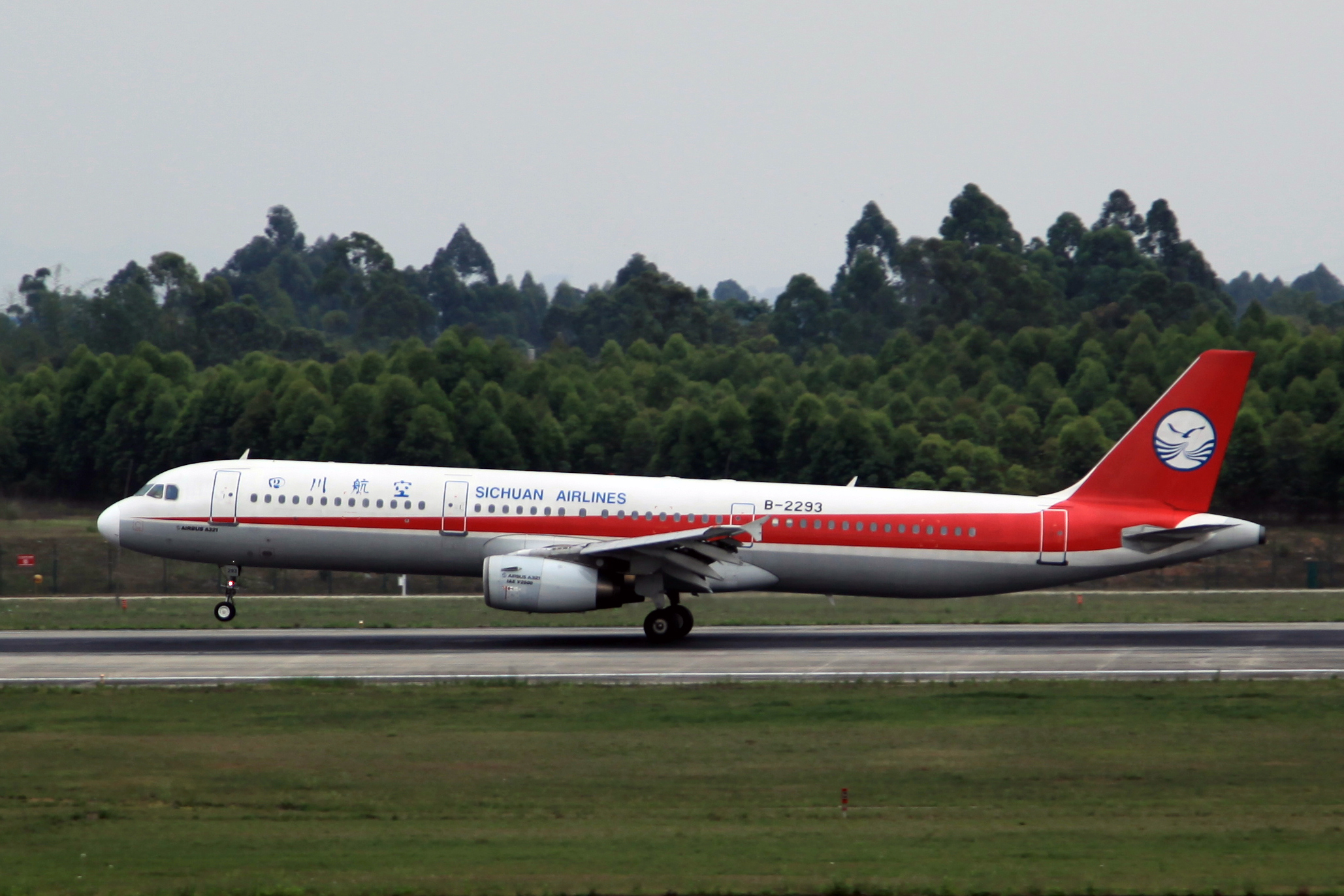
Sichuan Airlines Airbus A321-100 in 2013

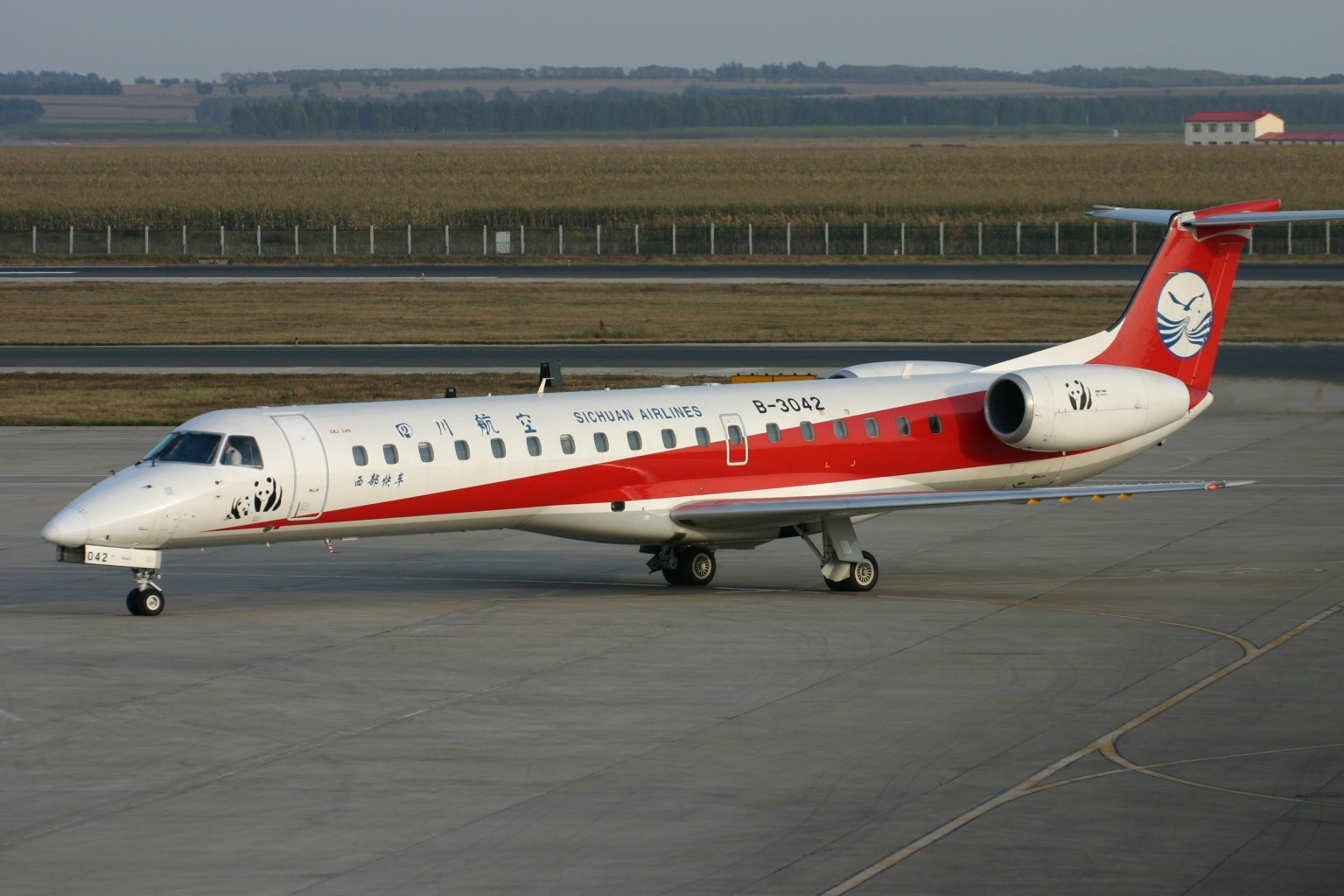
Sichuan Airlines Embraer ERJ 145 in 2012

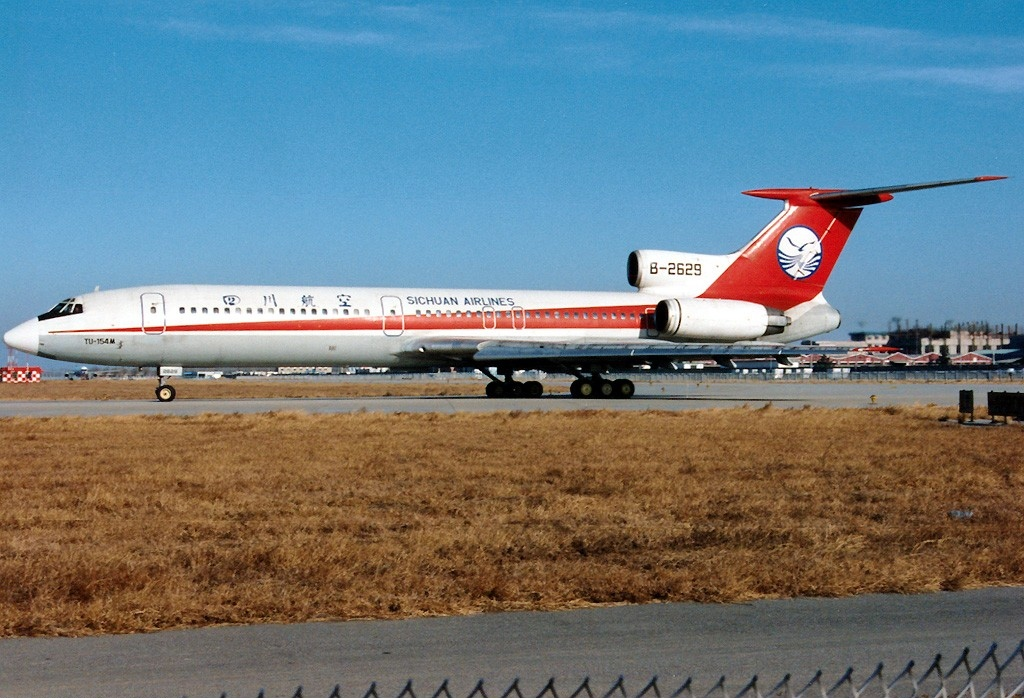
Sichuan Airlines Tupolev Tu-154 in 1995

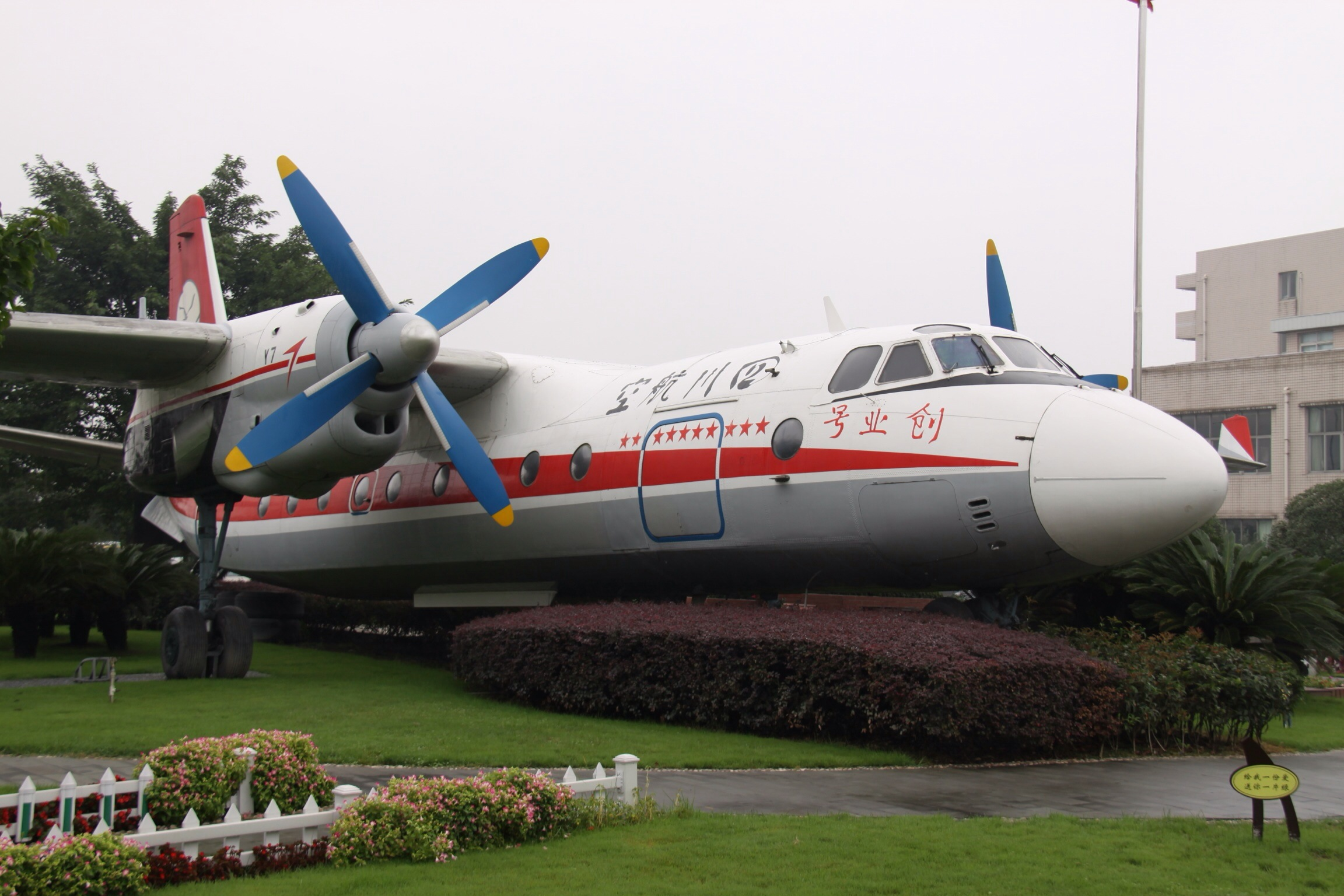
The Xi'an Y-7 is Sichuan Airlines' first self-owned aircraft which is still stored outside Sichuan Airlines' building

== Golden Panda ==
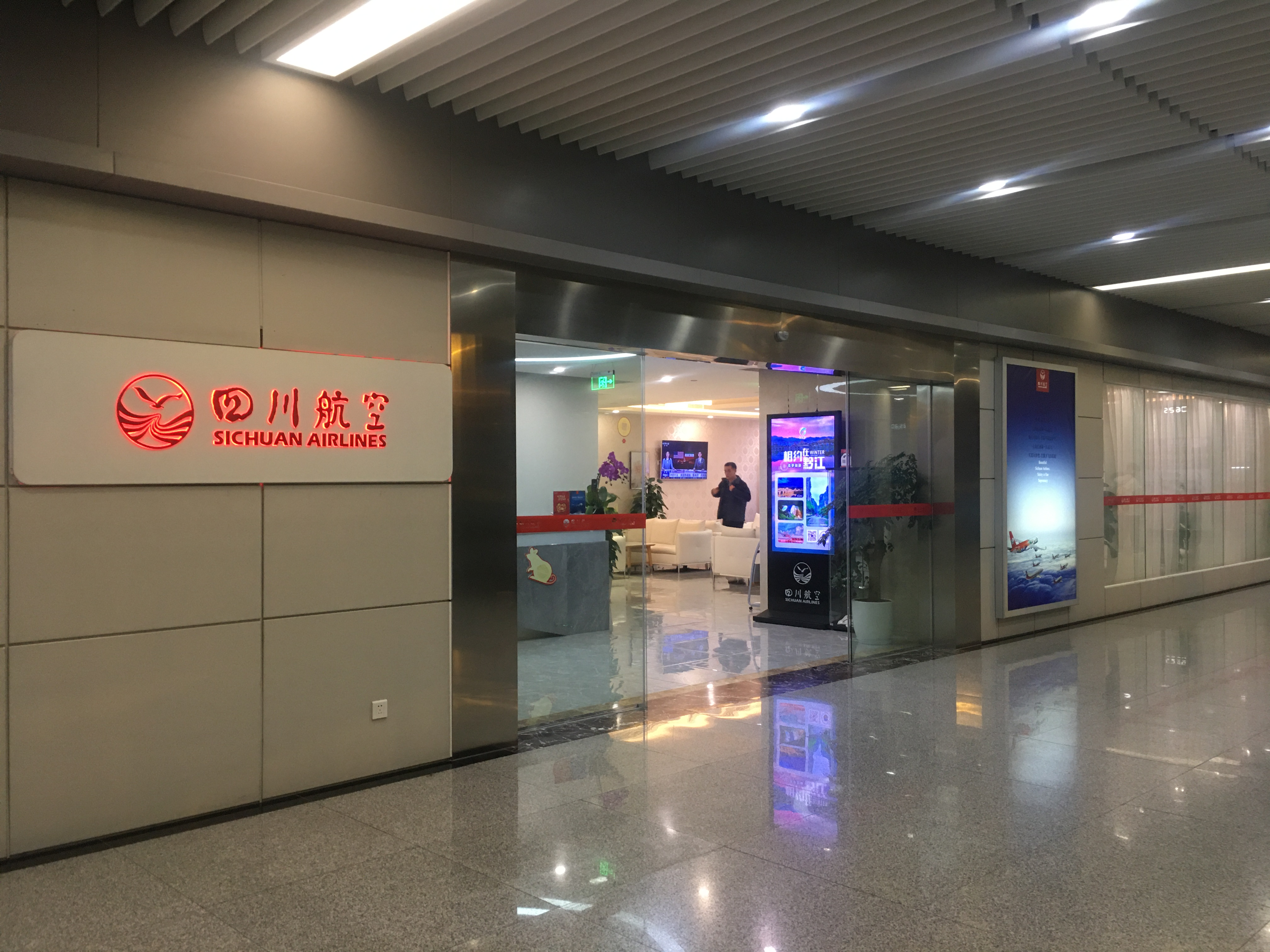
Sichuan Airlines lounge at Chongqing Jiangbei International Airport

The Golden Panda Club is a frequent-flyer program launched by Sichuan Airlines. Members can accumulate flight mileage and enjoy free tickets and other product rewards. After flying a certain number of miles, members can be upgraded to VIP members and enjoy free upgrades, free first-class lounge waiting, free baggage allowance, and other value-added services.

== Accidents and incidents ==
- On 14 May 2018, Sichuan Airlines Flight 8633, an Airbus A319 from Chongqing Jiangbei International Airport to Lhasa Gonggar Airport, diverted to Chengdu Shuangliu International Airport after a windshield on the copilot's side of the cockpit blew off, intrinsically similar to the 1990 British Airways Flight 5390 Incident, resulting in a loss of a part of the flight control panel. The flight crew made a difficult landing with decompression failure and extremely low temperature. The copilot and a flight attendant were reported injured. Later, the incident was adapted into the film "The Captain (2019 film)" and was also featured in the documentary series Mayday.

== See also ==
- Civil aviation in China
- List of airlines of China
- List of airports in China
- List of companies of China
- Transport in China
- The Captain (2019 film)
