= Air Macau =

National airline of Macau

Air Macau Company Limited 澳門航空股份公司 Companhia de Transportes Aéreos Air Macau, S.A.R.L.

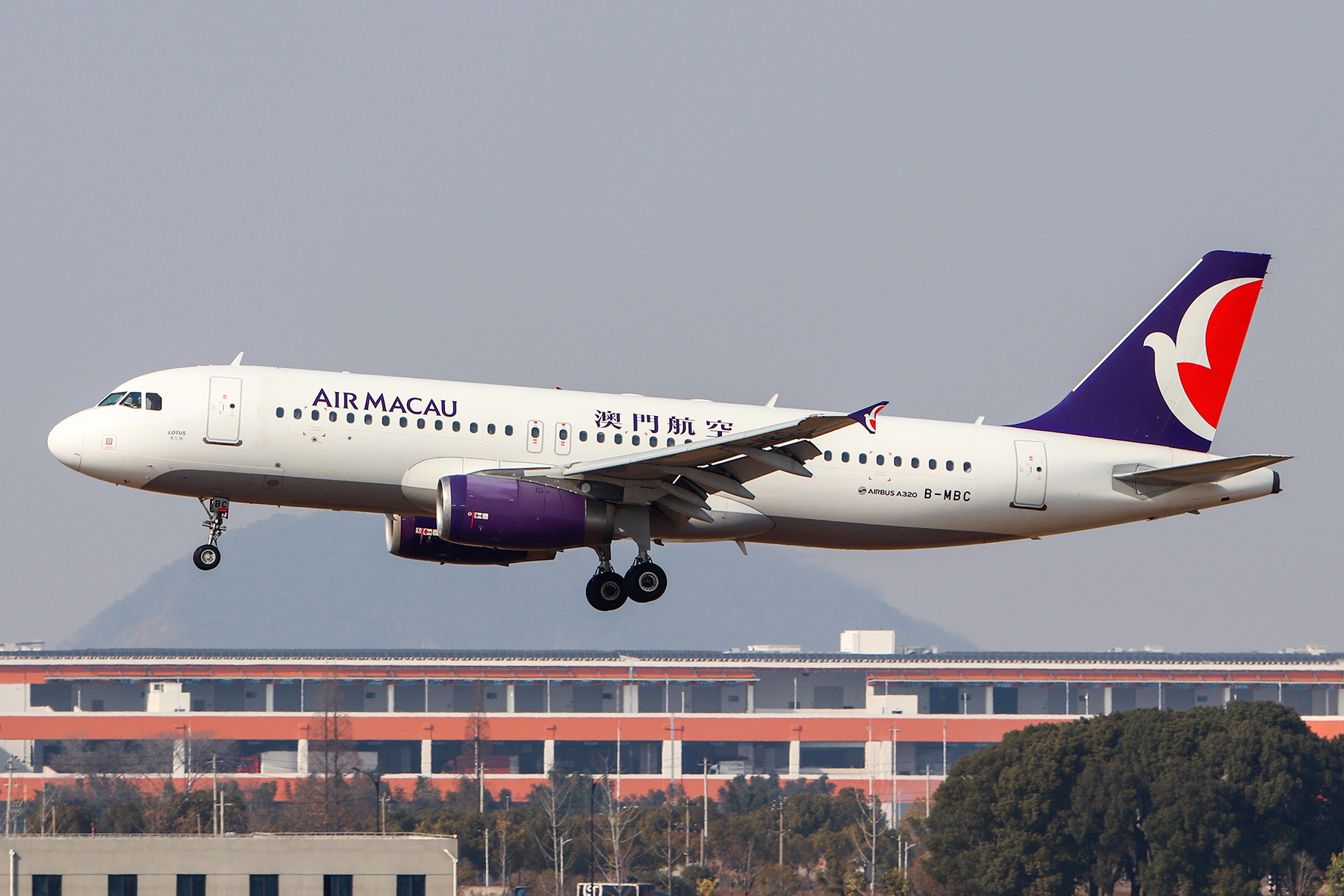
- Air Macau Airbus A320
IATA	ICAO	Call sign
NX	AMU	AIR MACAU
- Founded: 13 September 1994; 32 years ago
- Commenced operations: 9 November 1995; 31 years ago
- Hubs: Macau International Airport
- Frequent-flyer program: Lotus Miles
- Fleet size: 23
- Destinations: 29
- Parent company: Air China (66.9%)
- Headquarters: Macau
- Key people: Zhao Xiaohang (chairman); Chen Hong (CEO)
- Revenue: ▲MOP78.76 million (2017)
- Employees: 1,279 (31 March 2016)
- Website: www.airmacau.com.mo

Air Macau Company Limited
- Traditional Chinese: 澳門航空股份公司
- Simplified Chinese: 澳门航空股份公司
Transcriptions
Standard Mandarin
- Hanyu Pinyin: Àomén Hángkōng Gǔfèn gōngsī
Yue: Cantonese
- Jyutping: ou3 mun4*2 hong4 hung1 gu2 fan6*2 gung1 si1

Portuguese name
- Portuguese: Companhia de Transportes Aéreos Air Macau, S.A.R.L.

Air Macau is the flag carrier of Macau. It operates services to destinations in mainland China, Indonesia, Japan, Malaysia, the Philippines, Singapore, South Korea, Taiwan, Thailand, and Vietnam from the airline's home base at Macau International Airport. In 2014, Air Macau carried 2.12 million passengers with an average load factor of 68.20% and carried 15,900 tonnes of cargo and mail.

== History ==
The airline was established on 13 September 1994, and began commercial operations on 9 November 1995, with a flight from Macau to Beijing and Shanghai. Prior to 1995, there was no air service to Macau since 1962 other than the helicopter service. Seaplane service had been provided by Macau Air Transport Company from 1948 to 1961. One-aircraft service between Beijing, Shanghai and Taipei began on 8 December 1995. The first pure-freighter service was launched on 7 October 2002, between Taipei and Shenzhen via Macau.

In 1999, the airline had 1.1 million passengers each year, with 80% of them originating from two cities in Taiwan: Kaohsiung and Taipei.

In 2006, Air Macau was owned by China National Aviation Holding (51%), TAP Air Portugal (20%), STDM (14%), EVA Air (5%), the government of Macau (5%) and Macau investors (5%). It employs 1,245 staff (at March 2016). In 2009, two companies controlled by Edmund Ho, the Chief Executive of Macau sold a combined 1.25% stake to Air China for a sum undisclosed by the parties. In 2010, TAP sold its share to Air China.

== Corporate affairs ==
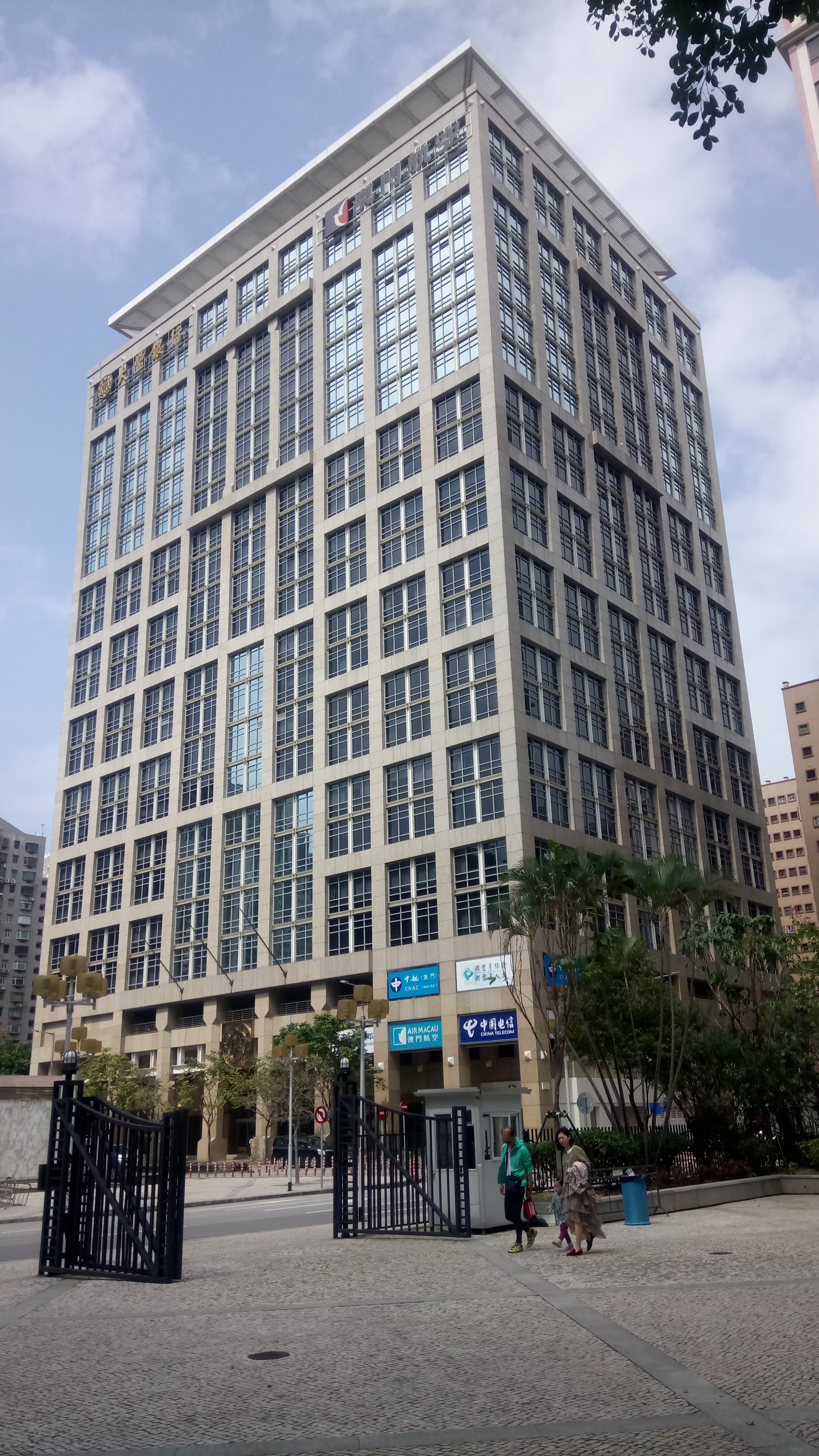
CNAC building

The head office is currently in the Edifício CNAC (中航大廈; 中航大厦; zung1 hong4 daai6 haa6; Zhòngháng Dàshà) in Sé (Cathedral Parish) on the Macau Peninsula. Previously it was in the Edifício Tai Wah (大華大廈; 大华大厦; daai6 waa4 daai6 haa6; Dàhuá Dàshà) in Sé.

== Destinations ==
The airline currently operates 24 destinations including 15 destinations in mainland China.

Country / Region	City	Airport	Notes	Refs
China	Beijing	Beijing Capital International Airport		
China	Beijing	Beijing Daxing International Airport		
China	Changzhou	Changzhou Benniu International Airport		
China	Chengdu	Chengdu Shuangliu International Airport		
China	Chengdu	Chengdu Tianfu International Airport	Terminated	
China	Chongqing	Chongqing Jiangbei International Airport		
China	Guiyang	Guiyang Longdongbao International Airport		
China	Hangzhou	Hangzhou Xiaoshan International Airport		
China	Nanjing	Nanjing Lukou International Airport		
China	Nanning	Nanning Wuxu International Airport		
China	Ningbo	Ningbo Lishe International Airport		
China	Qingdao	Qingdao Jiaodong International Airport		
China	Shanghai	Shanghai Hongqiao International Airport		
China	Shanghai	Shanghai Pudong International Airport		
China	Taiyuan	Taiyuan Wusu International Airport	Terminated	
China	Tianjin	Tianjin Binhai International Airport	Terminated	
China	Wenzhou	Wenzhou Longwan International Airport		
China	Xiamen	Xiamen Gaoqi International Airport		
China	Yiwu	Yiwu Airport	Terminated	
Indonesia	Jakarta	Soekarno–Hatta International Airport		
Japan	Osaka	Kansai International Airport		
Japan	Tokyo	Narita International Airport		
Macau, China	Macau	Macau International Airport	Hub	
Malaysia	Kuala Lumpur	Kuala Lumpur International Airport		
Philippines	Manila	Ninoy Aquino International Airport		
Singapore	Singapore	Changi Airport		
South Korea	Seoul	Incheon International Airport		
Taiwan	Kaohsiung	Kaohsiung International Airport		
Taiwan	Taichung	Taichung International Airport		
Taiwan	Taipei	Taoyuan International Airport		
Thailand	Bangkok	Don Mueang International Airport	Terminated	
Thailand	Bangkok	Suvarnabhumi Airport		
Vietnam	Da Nang	Da Nang International Airport		
Vietnam	Hanoi	Noi Bai International Airport		

=== Codeshare agreements ===
Air Macau codeshares with the following sister airlines:

- Air China
- All Nippon Airways
- Asiana Airlines
- EVA Air
- Philippine Airlines
- Shandong Airlines
- Shenzhen Airlines
- Thai Airways International

=== Interline agreements ===
- Lao Airlines

== Frequent flyer ==
Air Macau has its own frequent flyer program called Lotus Miles (formerly Privileges). On 1 January 2015, Privileges merged with Phoenix Miles, which is the frequent flyer program of Air China, hence the Lotus Miles is folded into Phoenix Miles.

== Fleet ==
Current fleet of Air Macau

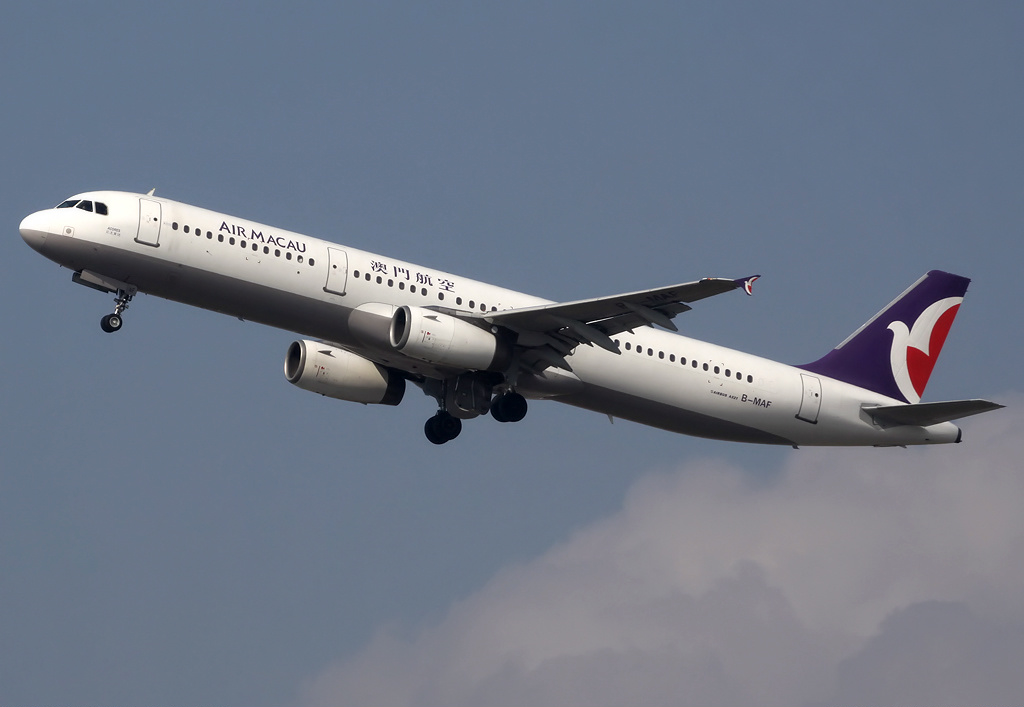
Airbus A321-100

=== Current fleet ===
As of July 2026, Air Macau operates the following aircraft:

Air Macau fleet
Aircraft	In service	Orders	Passengers			Notes
Aircraft	In service	Orders	J	Y	Total	Notes
Airbus A320-200	6	—	8	150	158	B-MCI in "Historic Centre of Macau" special livery.
Airbus A320neo	4	—	8	150	158	
Airbus A321-200	8	—	24	155	179	B-MBM in "Macau Welcomes You" special livery. B-MBB in "Macao - Creative City of Gastronomy" special livery.
Airbus A321-200	8	—	12	170	182	B-MBM in "Macau Welcomes You" special livery. B-MBB in "Macao - Creative City of Gastronomy" special livery.
Airbus A321neo	5	—	12	186	198	B-MBQ in "Macau Welcomes You" special livery.
Total	23	—				

=== Former fleet ===
As of August 2025, Air Macau operated 6 Airbus A320, 4 Airbus A320neo, 8 Airbus A321 and 5 Airbus A321neo.

Two Boeing 727-100Fs were rented to provide air cargo service to Shenzhen and Taiwan from 2002 to 2006; both have returned to revenue service Transmile Air Services (and repainted from Air Macau livery). Both aircraft were replaced with two A300-600RFs owned by Air Macau. These two Airbus A300 left the company in 2012. Two old A321-100 were replaced by two new A321-200 in 2013. In 2020 two Airbus A319-100 were retired.

=== Livery ===
Although Air Macau serves as Macau's flag carrier, the flag of the Special Administrative Region of Macau has never appeared on any of its aircraft, similar to Hong Kong's Cathay Pacific. However, unlike Cathay Pacific, which carried a Union Jack on its aircraft prior to the 1997 Handover of Hong Kong, the flag of Portugal never appeared on any Air Macau aircraft prior to the 1999 Handover of Macau.

=== Macau Asia Express ===
Macau Asia Express was a failed low-cost airline project, which was to be based in Macau and originally to be launched in 2007, offering scheduled flights mostly to mainland China. It was founded on 24 January 2006 with an initial funding of $30 million. It was owned by Air Macau (51%) and ST-CNAC (CNAC and Shun Tak Holdings) (49%). The aircraft fleet would have consisted of 6 Airbus A320 short-medium haul jet aircraft, which was planned to be expanded to 15–20 aircraft over the first years in operation.

In November 2007, the Macau Daily News reported that Macau Asia Express was suffering from funding problems, which led to a delay at the taking-over of ordered aircraft, and finally the revocation of its Air Operator's Certificate in 2008.

== See also ==
- Transport in Macau
