= Aircraft Maintenance and Engineering Corporation =

Chinese aircraft maintenance company

- Trade name: Ameco Beijing
- Company type: Joint venture
- Industry: Maintenance, Repair and Operations (MRO)
- Founded: August 1, 1989; 36 years ago
- Headquarters: Shunyi District, Beijing, China
- Owner: Air China (75%); Lufthansa (25%)
- Website: www.ameco.com.cn

Aircraft Maintenance and Engineering Corporation Limited
- Simplified Chinese: 北京飞机维修工程有限公司
- Traditional Chinese: 北京飛機維修工程有限公司
Transcriptions
Standard Mandarin
- Hanyu Pinyin: Běijīng Fēijī Wéixiū Gōngchéng Yǒuxiàngōngsī

Aircraft Maintenance and Engineering Corporation Limited known as Ameco Beijing is the largest aircraft maintenance supplier in China.

== History ==
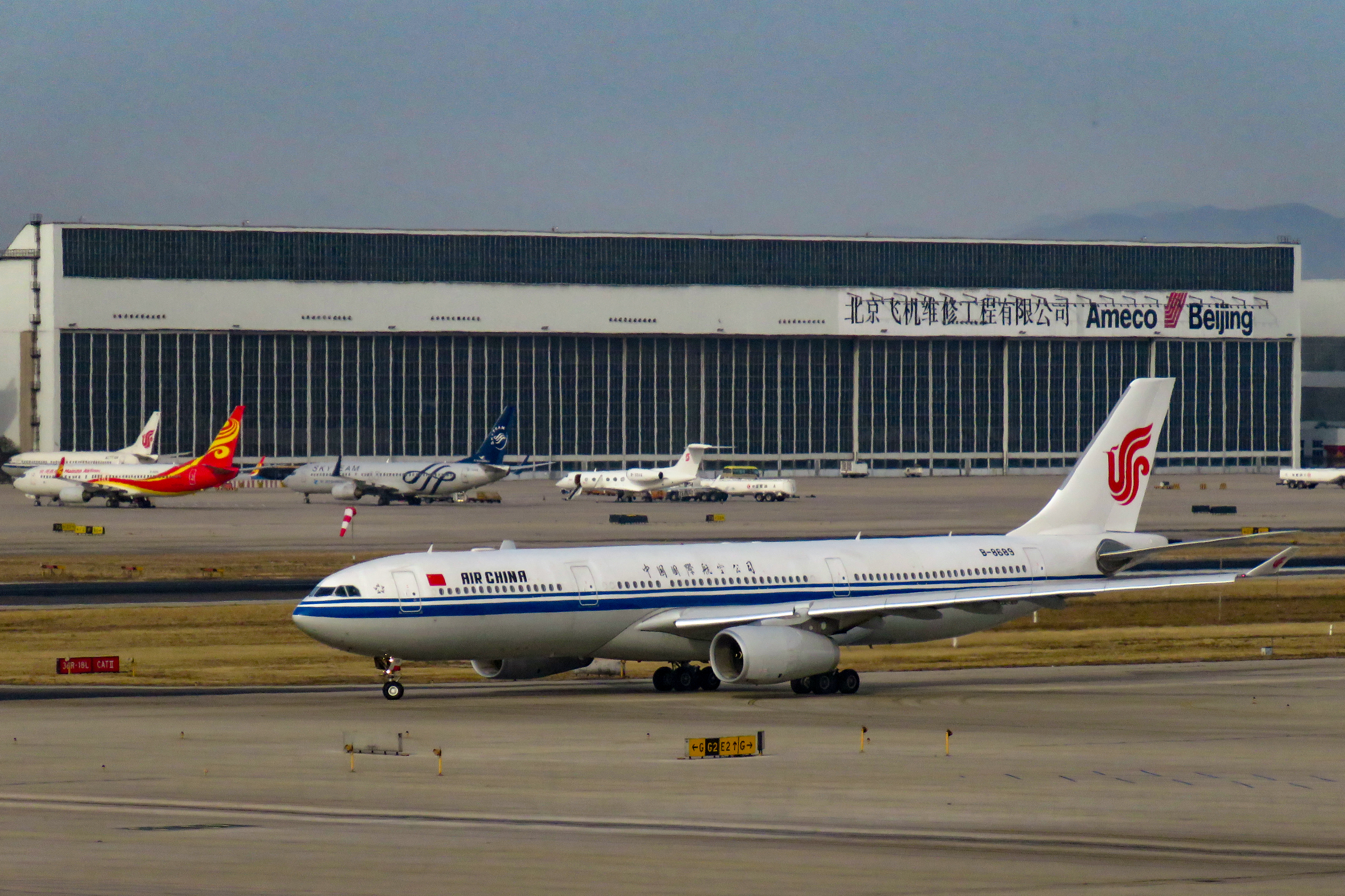
Ameco hangar, completed in 1996

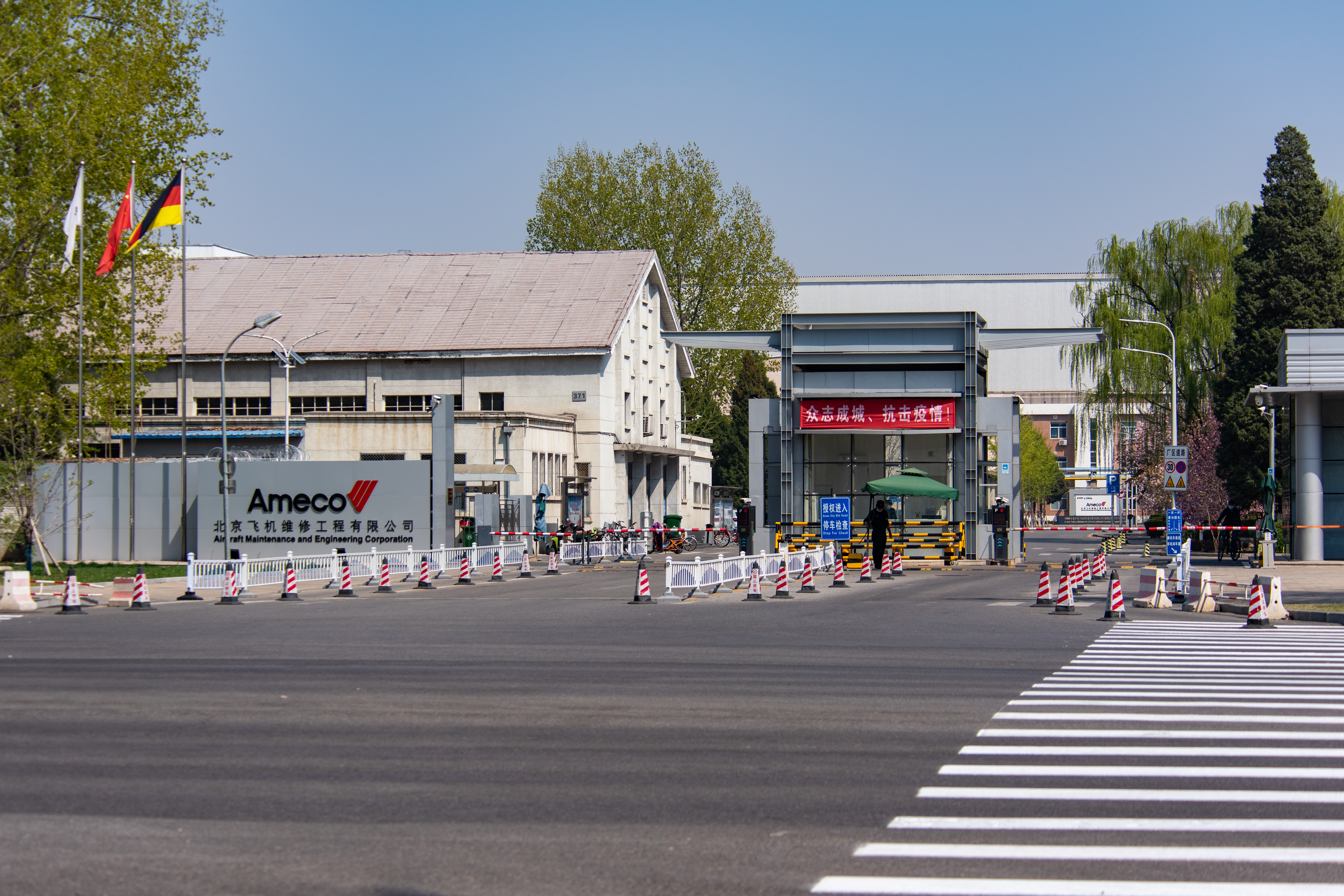
Entrance of Ameco, with its new logo visible

The company was founded in May 1989 by Air China as a 60/40 joint venture with minority partner Lufthansa under a joint venture agreement set to last for 15 years. Each side made contributions to the joint venture with Air China providing 3,750 employees, the workflow of Air China maintenance, spare stocks, and a sprawling maintenance complex at Beijing Capital International Airport while Lufthansa provided an initial capital infusion of $37.6 million and technical and management support. The company was officially registered on 1 August 1989.

In the first few years, the company made major upgrades in facilities and training. An apprentice training program was started in 1990 to train Chinese aircraft, engine, and avionics technicians. The first class of 48 students graduated in 1992. A new $65.6 million hangar was built in 1996 with enough space to fit four Boeing 747 wingtip to wingtip, allowing Ameco to perform heavy maintenance. In 2008, another new hangar was built to meet the maintenance demand of Airbus A380.

== Services ==
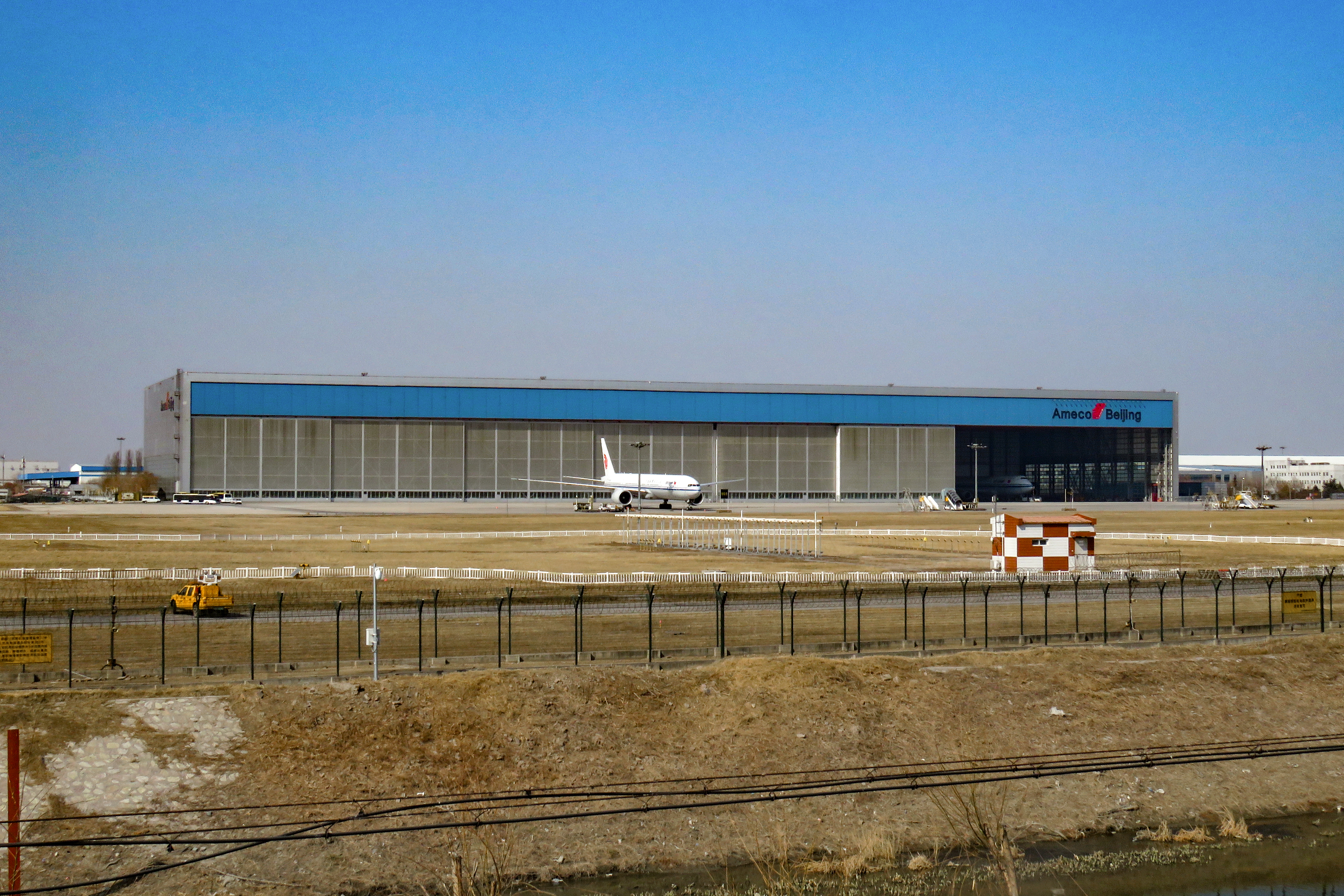
Ameco A380 hangar completed in 2008

In addition to the main facilities in Beijing, Ameco has 6 outstations in Shanghai, Guangzhou, Chongqing, Tianjin, Qingdao and Chengdu.

Early on the company gained foreign clients, painting aircraft for Northwest Airlines, Air New Zealand, and Korean Air. It received its first European heavy maintenance orders in 1997 when Lufthansa started to move overhaul work from Hamburg headquarters to Ameco.

In 2005, United Airlines and Ameco signed a 5-year deal for heavy maintenance work on the entire fleet of 55 Boeing 777s. The relationship expanded in 2010, when another 5-year contract was signed, including both the Boeing 747s and 777s fleets. In the same year, Aeroflot signed a deal to send line check work on 4 Boeing 767s to Ameco.

== See also ==
- HAECO: aircraft maintenance company headquartered in Hong Kong
- GAMECO
