= Air China =

Flag carrier airline of the People's Republic of China

Air China 中国国际航空公司

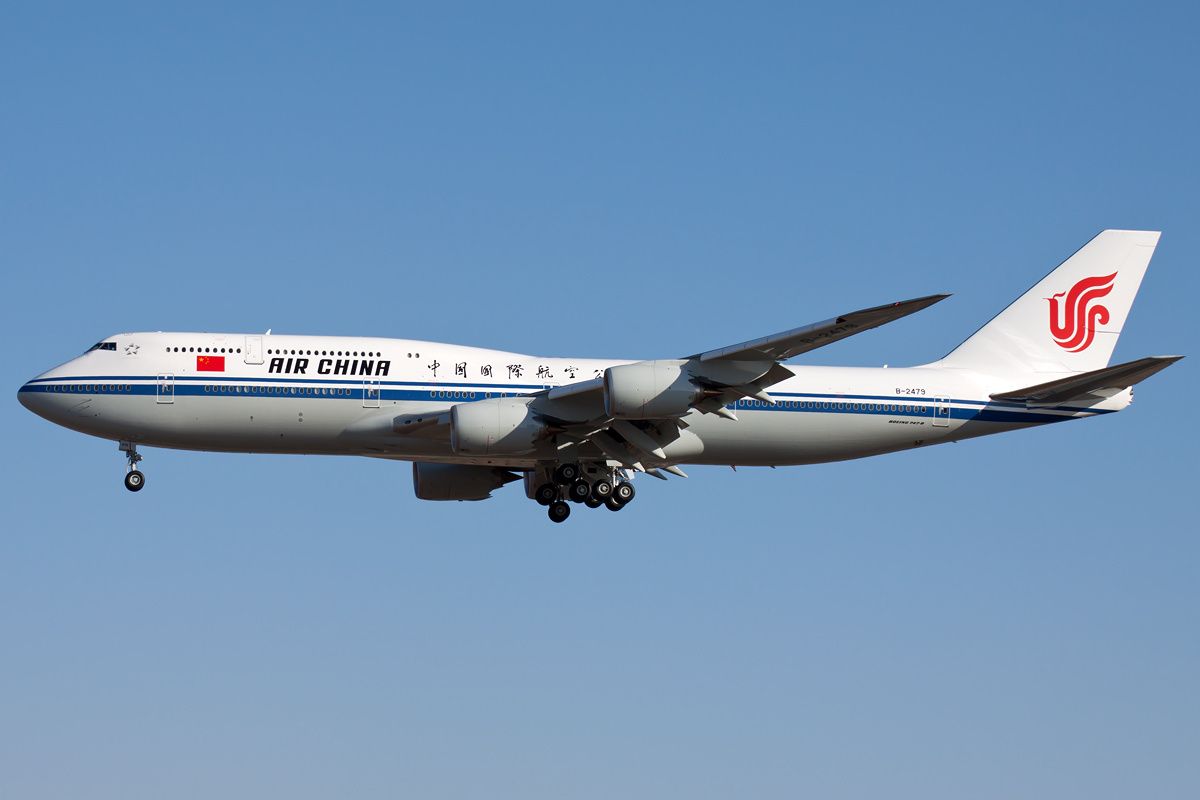
- Air China Boeing 747-8
| IATA | ICAO | Call sign |
|---|---|---|
| CA | CCA | AIR CHINA (Note: Chinese airlines use Mandarin Chinese callsigns when in Chinese airspace. Air China's Mandarin callsign is 国航; pinyin: guóháng, lit. "national airline".) |
- Founded: 1 July 1988; 38 years ago
- Hubs: Beijing–Capital; Beijing–Daxing; Chengdu–Shuangliu; Chengdu–Tianfu
- Secondary hubs: Shanghai–Pudong
- Focus cities: Chongqing; Dalian; Hangzhou; Hohhot; Hong Kong; Kunming; Shenzhen; Tianjin; Wuhan
- Frequent-flyer program: PhoenixMiles
- Alliance: Star Alliance
- Subsidiaries: Air China Cargo (51%); Air Macau (66.9%); AMECO (75%); Beijing Airlines (51%); Cathay Pacific (29.9%); Dalian Airlines (80%); Shandong Airlines (51%); Shenzhen Airlines (51%); Sichuan Airlines (10%); Tibet Airlines (31%)
- Fleet size: 537 (Note: 964 (group fleet as of 31 December 2025))
- Destinations: 218
- Parent company: Air China Group (53.46%); Cathay Pacific (18.13%)
- Traded as: SSE: 601111 (A share); SEHK: 753 (H share); LSE: AIRC
- Headquarters: Beijing Tianzhu Airport Industrial Zone, Shunyi District, Beijing, China
- Key people: Wa Mingyuan (president, vice chairman & director); Ma Chongxian (chairman)
- Revenue: ▲CN¥166.70 billion (2024)
- Operating income: ▲CN¥−1.60 billion (2024)
- Net income: ▲CN¥2.22 billion (2024)
- Total assets: ▲CN¥345.75 billion (2024)
- Total equity: ▲CN¥45.13 billion (2024)
- Employees: 65,000 (2023)
- Website: airchina.com

Air China Limited
- Simplified Chinese: 中国国际航空股份公司
- Traditional Chinese: 中國國際航空股份公司
- Literal meaning: China International Airlines, Company Limited by Shares
Transcriptions
Standard Mandarin
- Hanyu Pinyin: Zhōngguó guójì hángkōng gǔfèn gōngsī

Alternative Chinese name
- Simplified Chinese: 中国国际航空公司
- Traditional Chinese: 中國國際航空公司
- Literal meaning: China International Airlines Company
Transcriptions
Standard Mandarin
- Hanyu Pinyin: Zhōngguó guójì hángkōng gōngsī

Air China
- Simplified Chinese: 国航
- Traditional Chinese: 國航
- Literal meaning: National Airline
Transcriptions
Standard Mandarin
- Hanyu Pinyin: Guóháng

Air China, officially Air China Limited, (中国国际航空公司, Zhōngguó guójì hángkōng gōngsī) is the flag carrier airline of the People's Republic of China. It is headquartered in Shunyi, Beijing. The airline offers both domestic and international flights to different destinations around China and the world.

The airline was established in 1988 after the former Chinese flag carrier CAAC was split into six airlines, one of them being Air China; it later merged with several of the successor airlines. It is 53.46% owned by the state-owned China National Aviation Holding. Air China is one of the three major airlines in the country, along with China Southern Airlines and China Eastern Airlines.

Air China's hub airports are in Beijing and Chengdu. In 2017, the airline carried 102 million domestic and international passengers with an average load factor of 81%. The airline joined Star Alliance in 2007.

== History ==
=== Early years ===
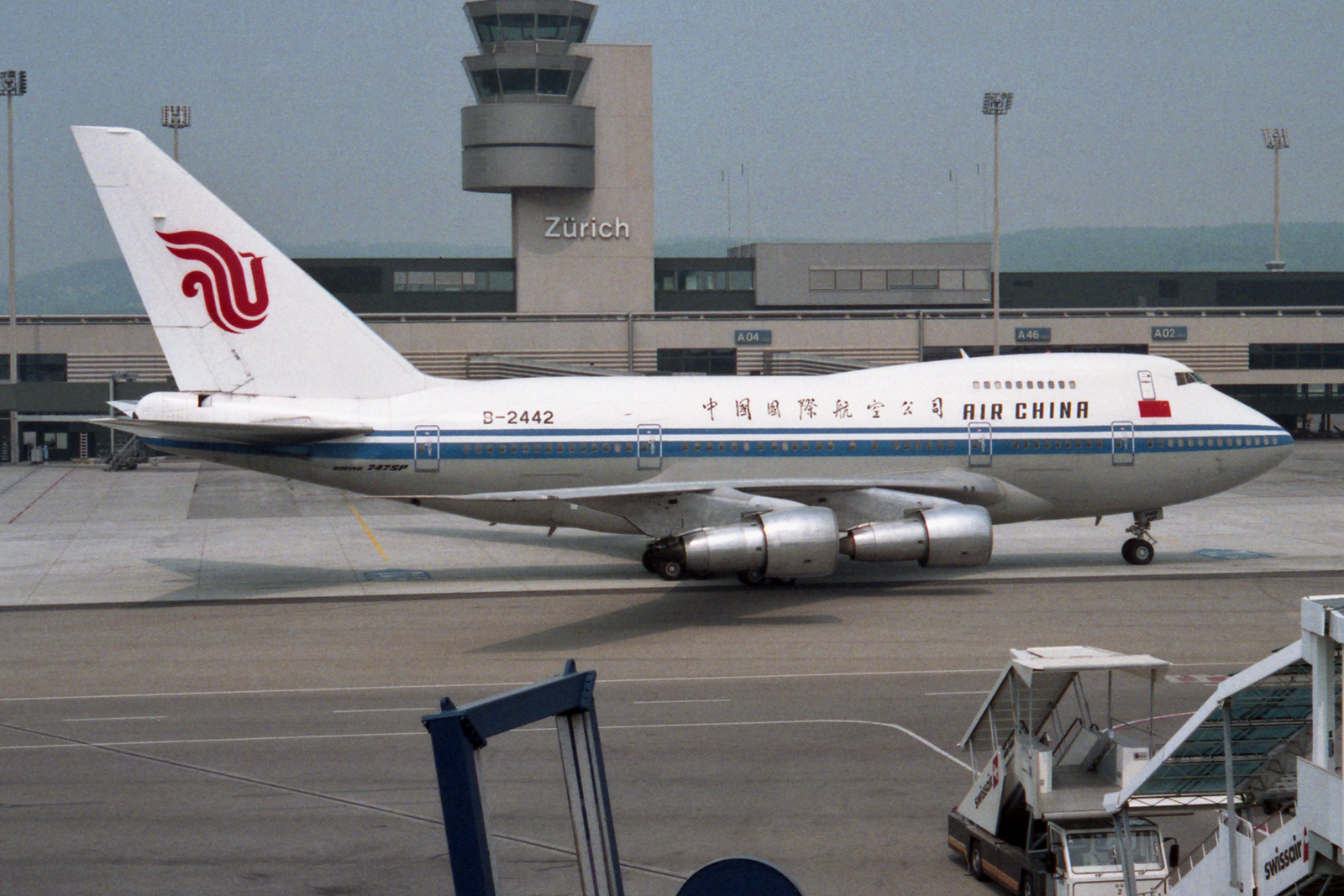
Air China Boeing 747SP at Zürich Airport in 1992

Air China was established and commenced operations on 1 July 1988 as a result of the Chinese government's decision in late 1987 to split the operating divisions of Civil Aviation Administration of China (CAAC) into six separate airlines: Air China, China Eastern, China Southern, China Northern, China Southwest, and China Northwest. Air China was assigned primary responsibility for intercontinental flights and took over CAAC's long-haul aircraft (Boeing 707s, 747s, and 767s) and routes.

In January 2001, the former CAAC's six airlines agreed on a merger plan, according to which Air China was to acquire China Southwest Airlines. Before this acquisition, Air China was the country's fourth largest domestic airline. The merger created a group with assets of 56 billion yuan (US$8.63 billion) and a fleet of 118 aircraft. In October 2002, Air China consolidated with the China National Aviation Holding and China Southwest Airlines.

On 15 December 2004, Air China was successfully listed on the Hong Kong and London Stock Exchanges. In 2006, Air China signed an agreement to join Star Alliance. It became a member of the alliance on 12 December 2007 alongside Shanghai Airlines.

In July 2009, Air China acquired $19.3 million of shares from its troubled subsidiary Air Macau, lifting its stake in the carrier from 51% to 81%. One month later, Air China spent HK$6.3 billion (US$813 million) to raise its stake in Cathay Pacific from 17.5% to 30%, expanding its presence in Hong Kong.

=== Development since 2010 ===
In April 2010, Air China completed the increase of shareholdings in Shenzhen Airlines and became the controlling shareholder of Shenzhen Airlines, allowing Air China to further enhance its position in Beijing, Chengdu, and Shanghai, as well as achieve a more balanced domestic network.

On 2 December 2010, Air China received Spain's highest tourism industry award, the "Plaque for Tourist Merit." Air China was the first foreign airline to receive the award, which is given to organisations and individuals contributing to the Spanish tourism industry.

On 23 December 2010, Air China became the first Chinese airline to offer combined tickets that include domestic flights and shuttle bus services to nearby cities. The first combined flight-shuttle bus ticket connected Tianjin via shuttle bus with domestic flights passing through Beijing.

Air China began offering free Wi-Fi internet service on board its aircraft on 15 November 2011, making it the first Chinese carrier to offer this service. However the service is not allowed on smartphones, but only on tablets and laptops.

In 2012, after pressure from PETA, Air China stated that it would no longer transport monkeys to laboratories. PETA welcomed the airline's announcement.

On 3 July 2013, in time for the company's 25th anniversary, Air China successfully tested Wireless LAN in flight. It was the first global satellite internet flight in Mainland China.

In early 2015, it was announced that the airline had selected the Boeing 737 Next Generation and 737 MAX for its fleet renewal programme of 60 aircraft. The deal, with a value of over $6 billion at current list prices, has yet to be finalised.

On 15 October 2025, Air China's regional subsidiary, Air China Inner Mongolia, was re-integrated, becoming a branch of the national carrier.

== Corporate affairs ==
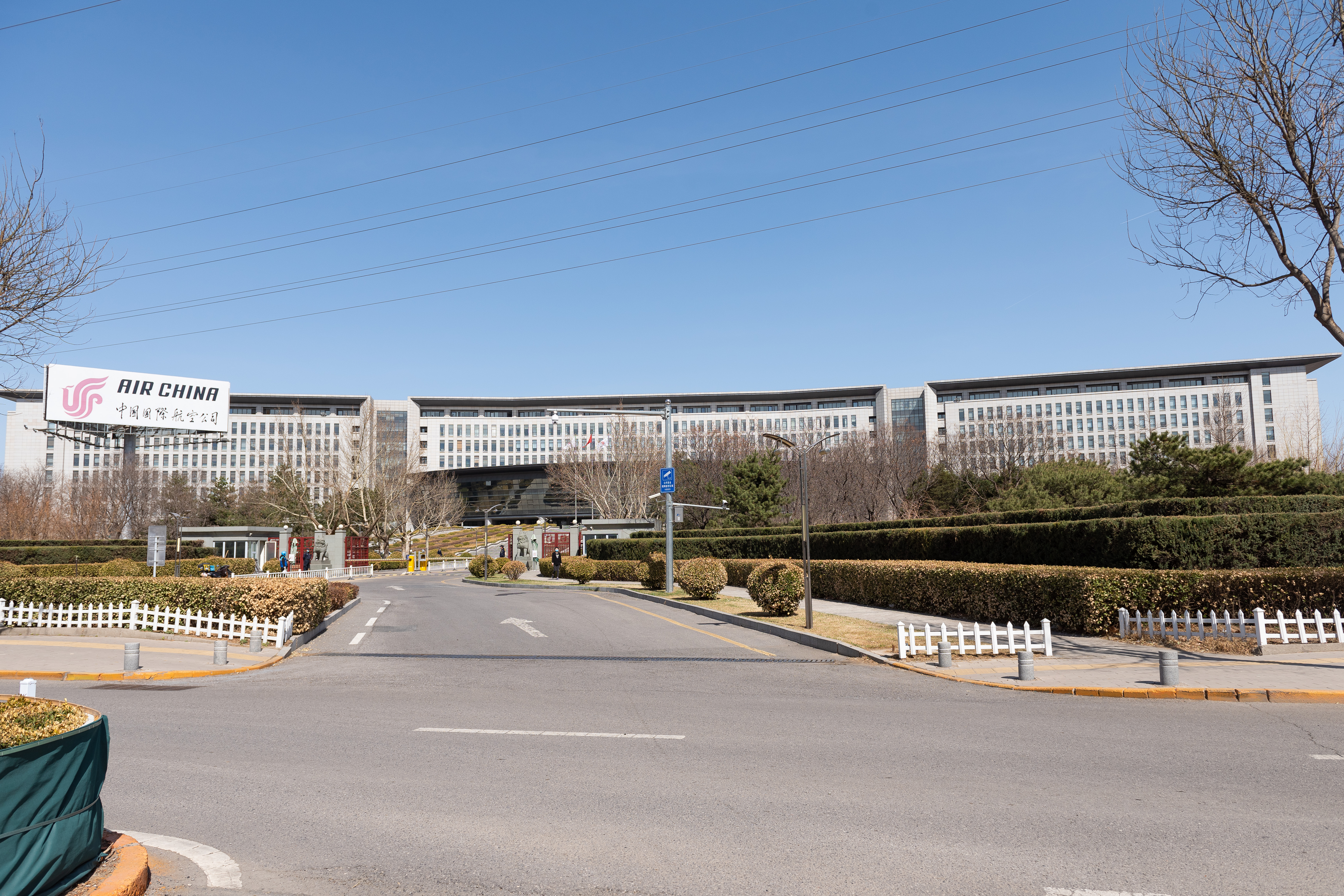
Air China HQ building

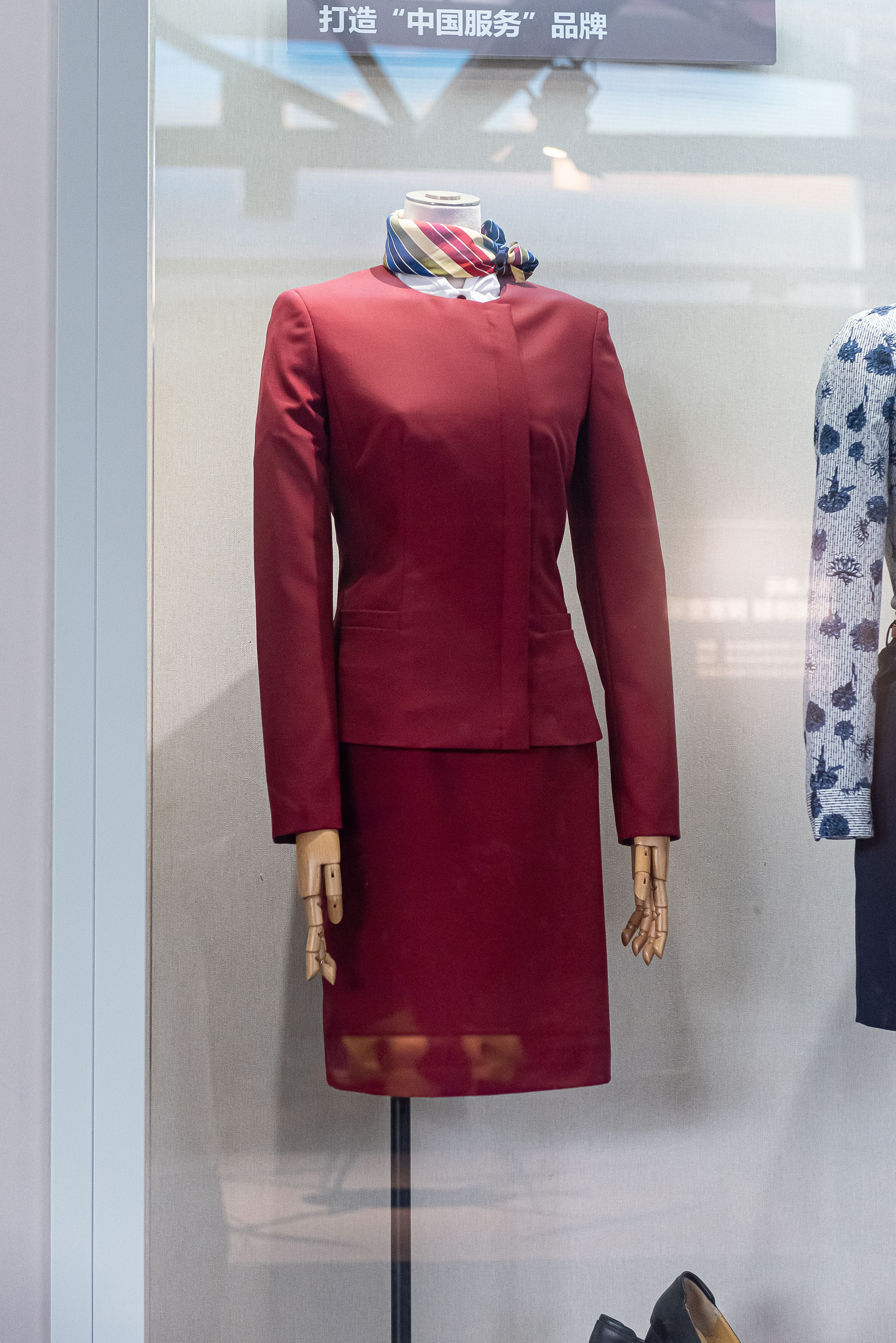
Current uniform of Air China (2003–present), designed by Olivier Lapidus, son of Ted Lapidus

The entity Air China Limited was registered in 2003, and its shares began trading in Hong Kong and London on 15 December 2004. Originally, the airline corporate entity was Air China International, which was founded in 2002. Air China International incorporated China Southwest Airlines and the air transportation services of the China National Aviation Corporation, becoming a new entity.

The Air China HQ Building (国航总部大楼; 國航總部大樓; Guó Háng Zǒngbù Dàlóu), the corporate headquarters, is located in Zone A of the Tianzhu Airport Industrial Zone (天竺空港工业区; 天竺空港工業區; Tiānzhú Kōng Gǎng Gōngyèqū) in Shunyi District, Beijing. The company registered office is on the ninth floor of the Blue Sky Mansion (蓝天大厦; 藍天大廈; Lántiān Dàshà), also in Zone A of the Tianzhu Airport Industrial Zone.

=== Ownership structure ===
| | Owner | Percentage of shares held |
|---|---|---|
| 1 | Aviation Corporation of China | 40.53 |
| 2 | Cathay Pacific | 16.26 |
| 3 | Hong Kong Securities Clearing Company | 10.43 |
| 4 | Aviation Corporation of China | 9.61 |
| 5 | China Securities Finance Corporation | 1.92 |
| 6 | Aviation Fuel Group of China | 1.47 |
| 7 | Hong Kong Securities Clearing Company | 0.97 |
| 8 | China State-owned Enterprises Structural Adjustment Fund | 0.41 |
| 9 | China Basic Pension Fund | 0.36 |
| 10 | China Merchants Anhua Bond Fund | 0.31 |

=== Branding and livery ===
The enterprise logo of Air China consists of an artistic Fenghuang pattern designed by artist Han Meilin. The phoenix logo is also the artistic transfiguration of the word "VIP". The Chinese text for the name of the airline is written in calligraphy by former national leader Deng Xiaoping. The English name "AIR CHINA" is also present. Air China is a member of Star Alliance.

History of Air China liveries
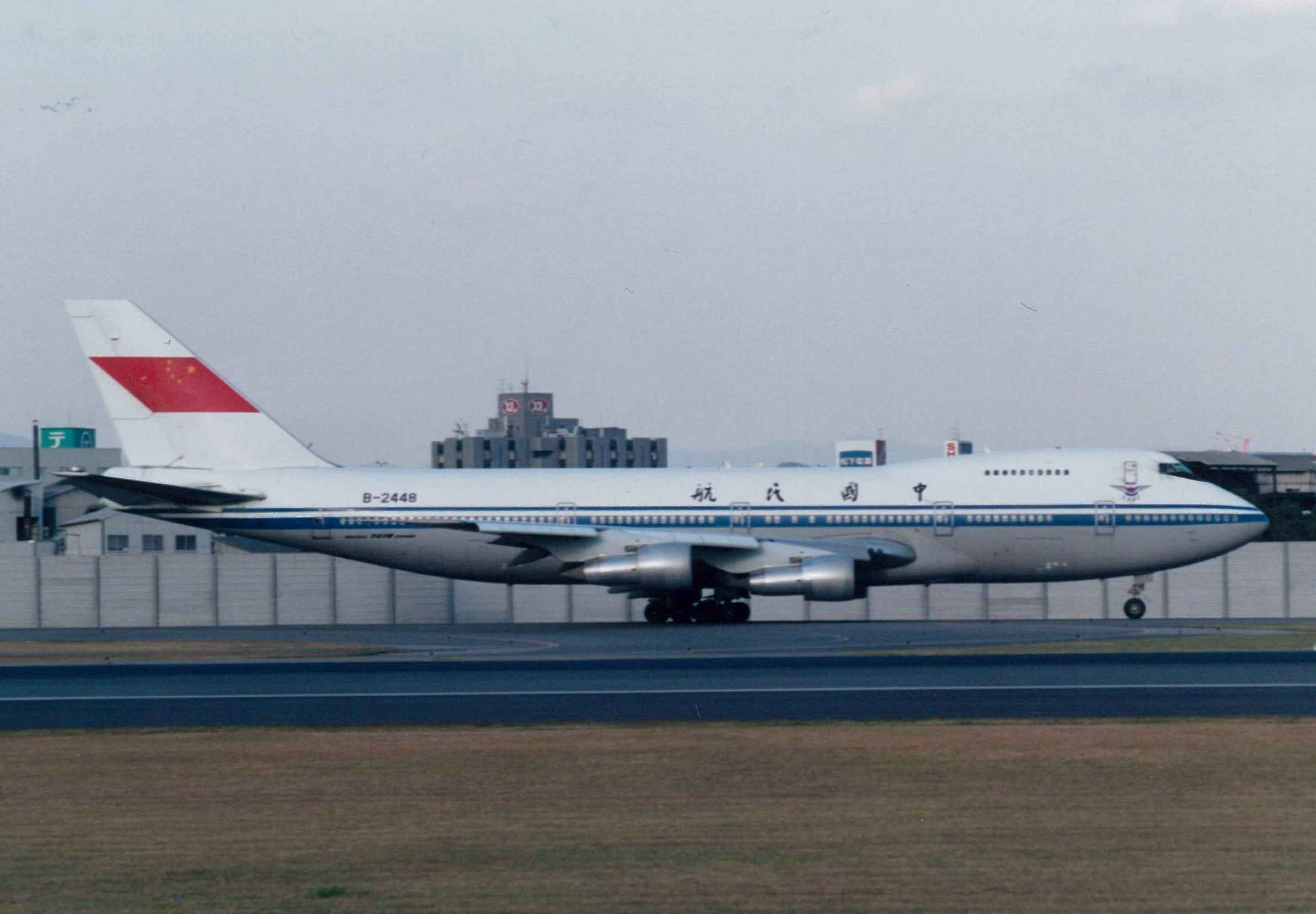
A Boeing 747-200 in the original CAAC livery after the split of CAAC Airlines.

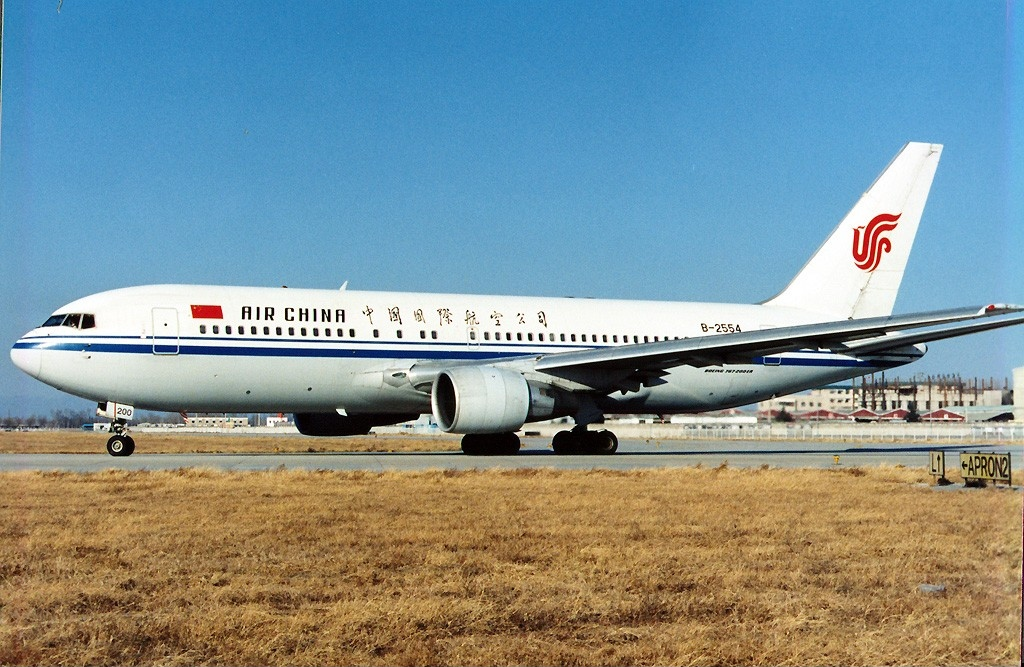
A Boeing 767-200ER in the second generation livery with the introduction of the phoenix-styled livery.

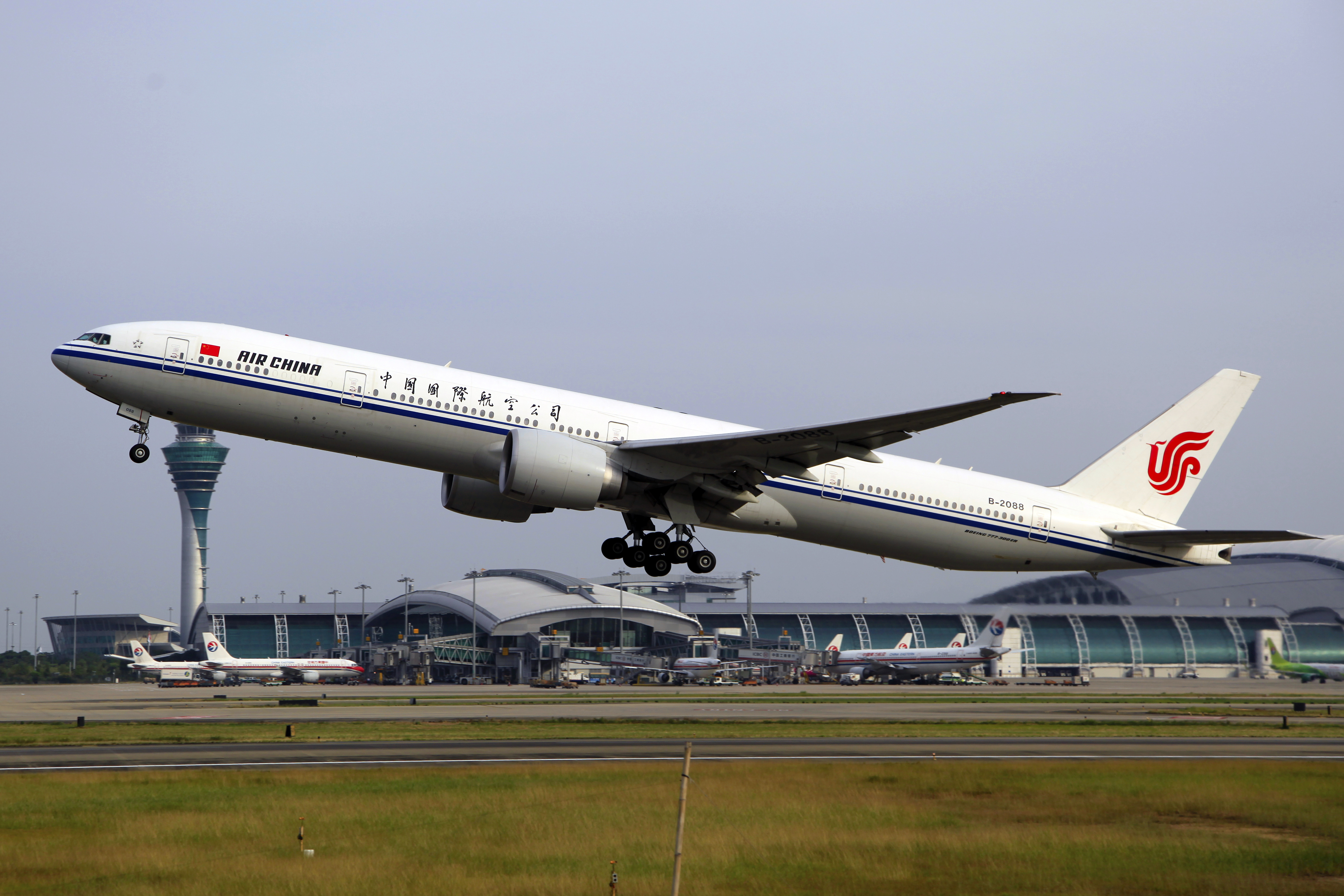
A Boeing 777-300ER in the current livery used on Boeing aircraft, in which the phoenix logo was enlarged and straightened.

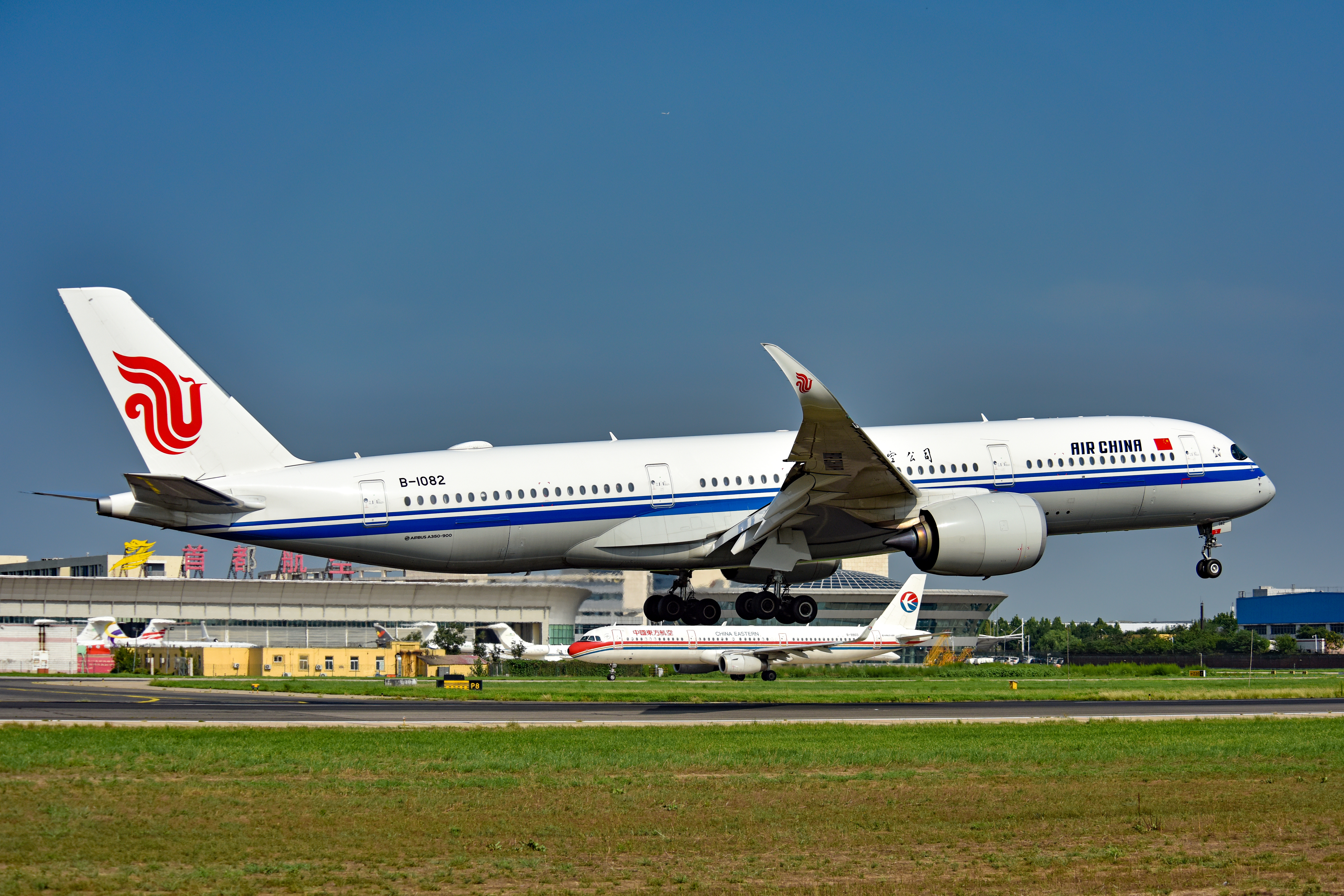
An Airbus A350-900 in the current livery used on Airbus aircraft. The Chinese name has a smaller size than in the livery used on Boeing aircraft.

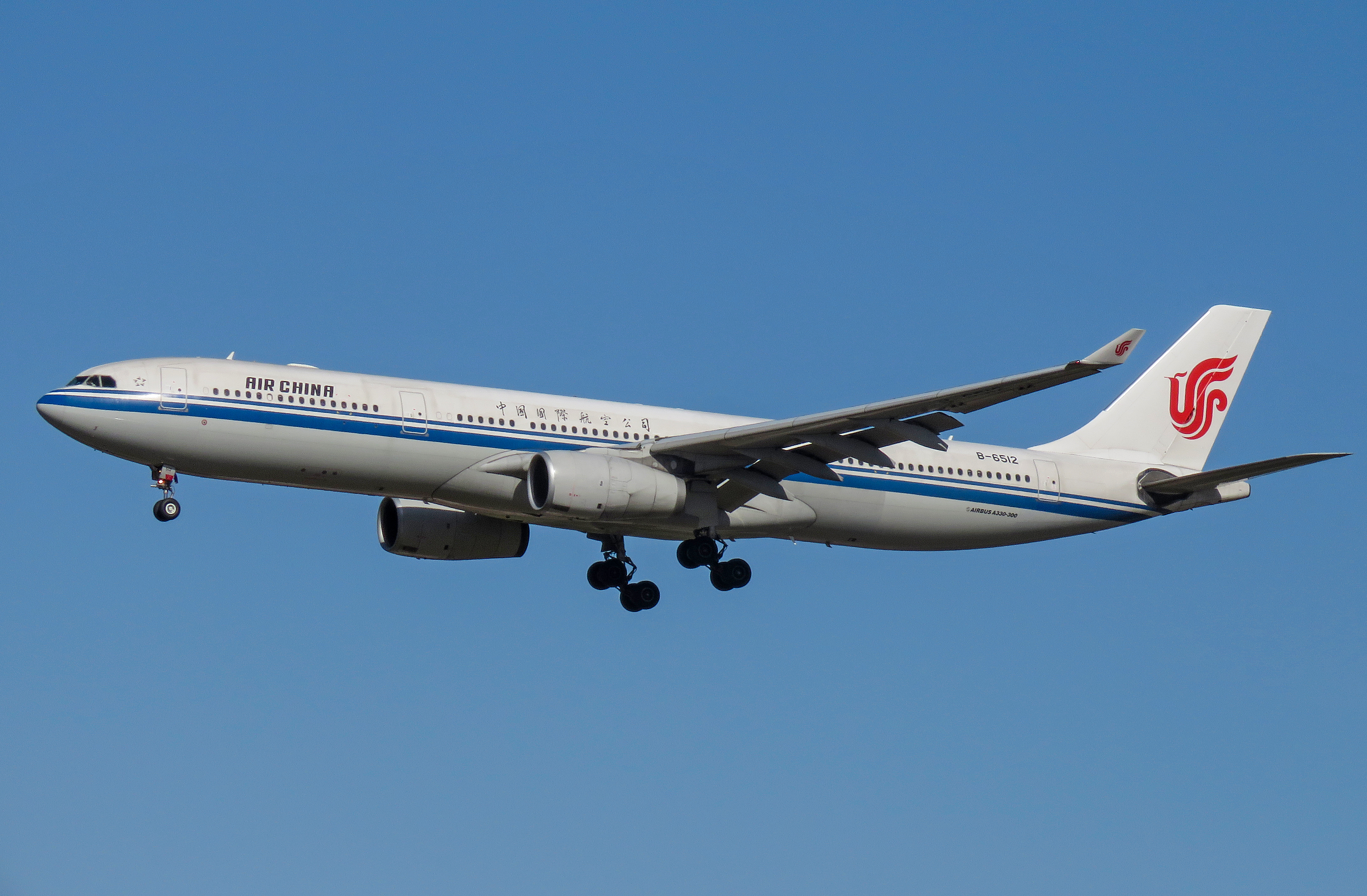
An Airbus A330-300 in the current livery used on Taiwan routes. The PRC flag is removed due to the Taiwan issue.

== Destinations ==
Countries served by Air China as of 2026. Mainland China Hong Kong Special Administrative Region and Macao Special Administrative Region Taiwan Other destinations

Air China's route network extends throughout Asia to the Middle East, Western Europe, and North America from its hubs at Beijing Capital International Airport and Chengdu Tianfu International Airport. It also currently reaches a significant number of Asian, Australian and European destinations from Shanghai. Some international routes operate from Chengdu, Chongqing, Dalian, Hangzhou, Kunming and Shenzhen. It is one of the few world airlines that fly to all six habitable continents.

On 10 December 2006, Air China began serving its first South American destination, São Paulo-Guarulhos (via Madrid-Barajas). This is the airline's longest direct flight. The service was initiated with a Boeing 767-300ER, but due to increased demand, the service's aircraft has been modernized to an Airbus A330-200, and later to a Boeing 787-9.

In summer 2011, Air China introduced the new Airbus A330-300 on long-haul services, starting with Düsseldorf, Germany. The aircraft featured the same two-class layout as the Airbus A330-200, but the economy cabin lacked seat-back entertainment, except in the first two rows, which also offered extra legroom. Düsseldorf became the third German destination in Air China's network. The airline launched a new Beijing-Milan-Malpensa service on 15 June 2011, complementing the airline's existing service to Milan from Shanghai.

Deliveries of the carrier's 19 new Boeing 777-300ERs commenced in mid 2011, with the aircraft forming the new "backbone of its future long-haul operations." The new Boeing 777-300ERs replaced the Boeing 747-400s on routes to U.S. destinations such as Los Angeles, New York, and San Francisco, but was expected to first enter service on flights to Paris from March 2012. The Boeing 777-300ER began to replace most 747 services once sufficient numbers entered the fleet. Air China expanded its operations in India with a Beijing-Mumbai route in September 2011, while the existing Delhi route was upgraded to the A330. The airline also launched service to Mumbai from Chengdu on 2 May 2012. The airline began using the Boeing 777-300ER on one of its two daily Beijing-Los Angeles flights on 1 June 2012. From late 2012 to early 2013, the airline replaced the Boeing 747-400s servicing the New York and San Francisco routes with the Boeing 777-300ER. With the addition of the Boeing 777-300ERs on the US routes, Air China increased frequency on the Beijing-New York route, changing the flights from 7 to 11 flights a week by adding two new flights to the route (CA989/990). On 21 January 2014, the airline launched its service to Hawaii with flights from Beijing to Honolulu, the first nonstop flights between the two cities. The airline also increased the frequency of service on the Beijing-Houston Intercontinental route from four times weekly to daily service from 30 March 2014. Beginning 10 June 2014, Air China introduced new nonstop service from Beijing to Washington-Dulles, operated by a Boeing 777-300ER. As of 29 September 2015, Air China also introduced a three times weekly flight to Montréal–Pierre Elliott Trudeau International Airport in a codeshare with Air Canada. The Montreal flight was extended to Havana from 27 December 2015.

Air China started its direct flights to Johannesburg, South Africa from 29 October 2015.

=== Joint Venture agreements ===
Air China has joint venture agreements with the following airlines:

- Austrian Airlines
- Cathay Pacific
- Lufthansa
- Shenzhen Airlines (subsidiary)
- Singapore Airlines
- Swiss International Air Lines

=== Codeshare agreements ===
Air China codeshares with the following airlines:

- Aegean Airlines
- Air Canada
- Air Dolomiti
- Air Macau
- Air New Zealand
- Air Serbia
- All Nippon Airways
- Asiana Airlines
- Avianca
- China Express Airlines
- Egyptair
- El Al
- Ethiopian Airlines
- EVA Air
- Juneyao Air
- Kunming Airlines
- LOT Polish Airlines
- Shandong Airlines
- South African Airways
- TAP Air Portugal
- Tibet Airlines (subsidiary)
- Turkish Airlines
- Uni Air
- United Airlines

=== Interline agreements ===
Air China has interline agreements with the following airlines:

- Air Astana
- Airlink
- Emirates
- flydubai
- Kuwait Airways
- Pakistan International Airlines
- Scoot

== Fleet ==
=== Current fleet ===
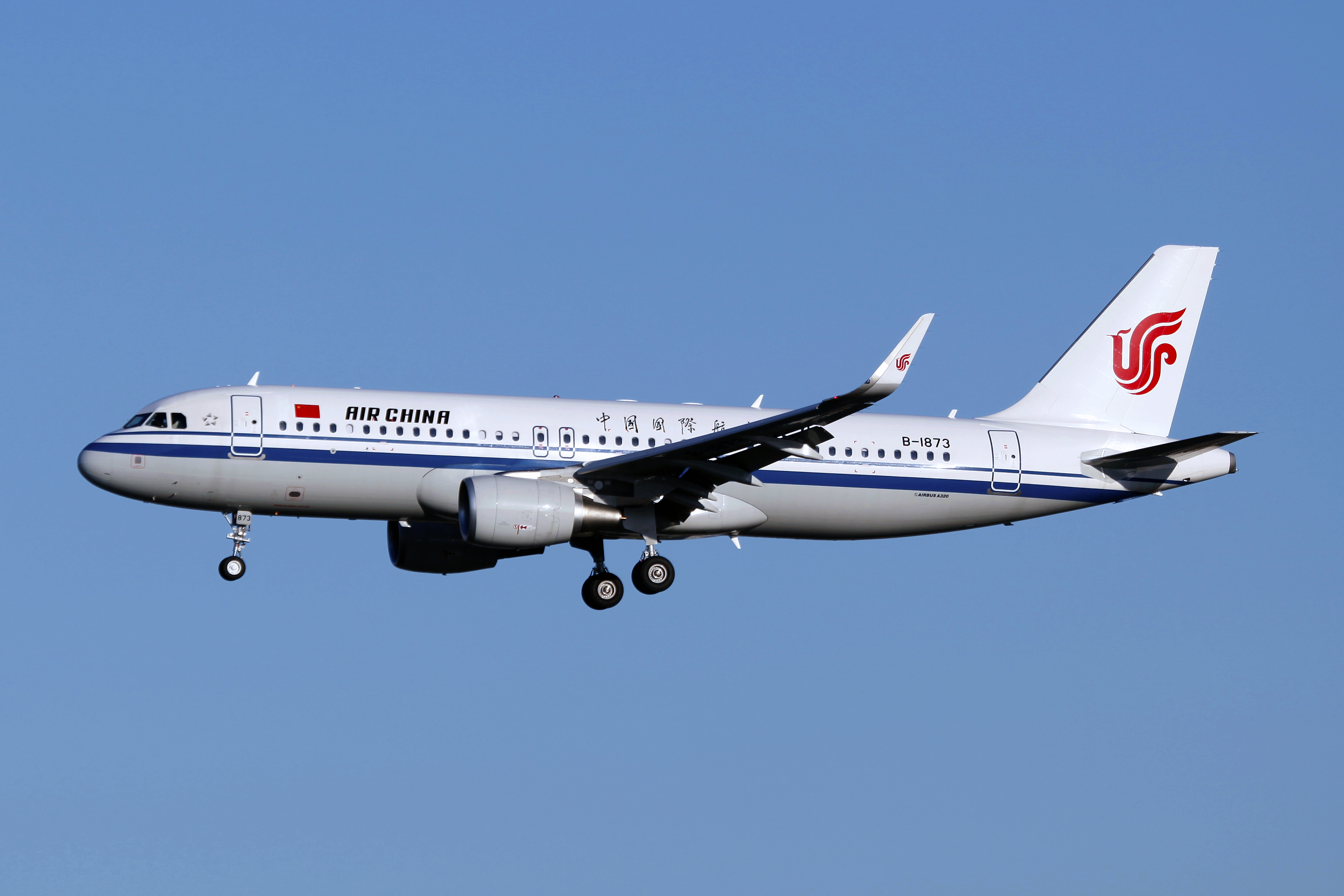
Airbus A320-200 in 2014

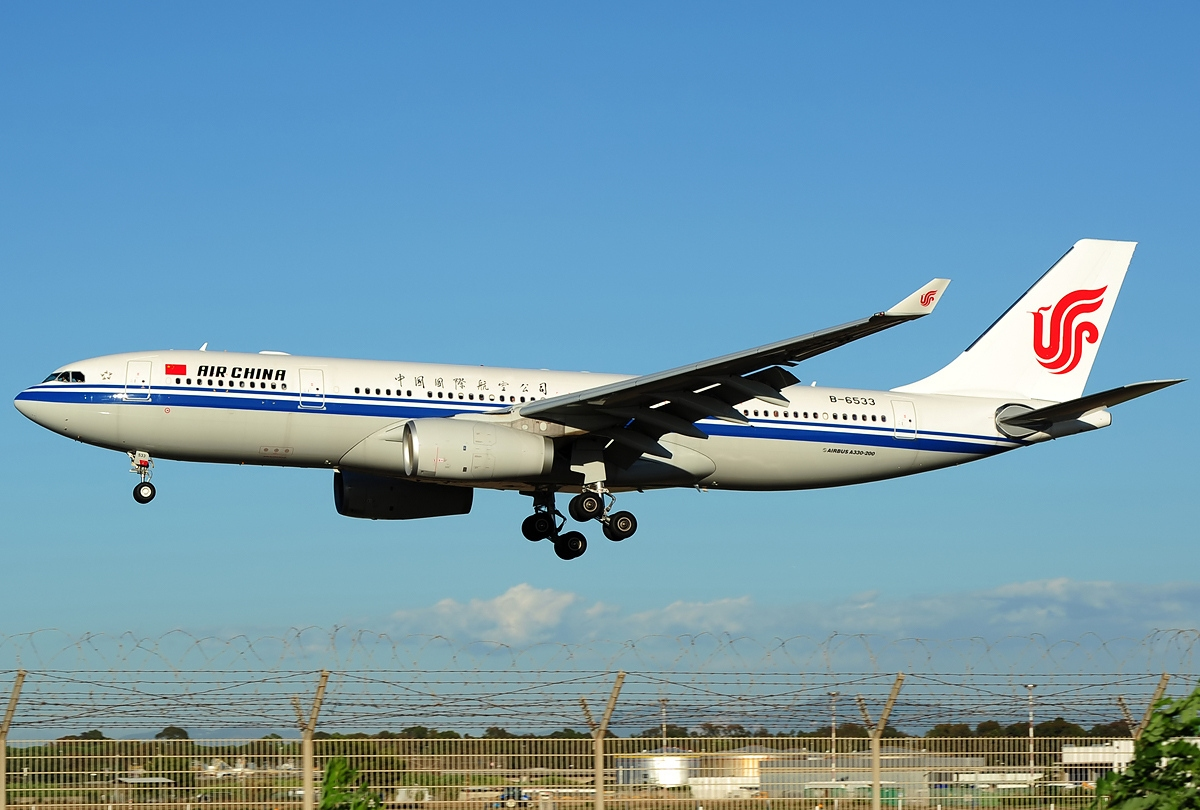
Airbus A330-200 in 2011

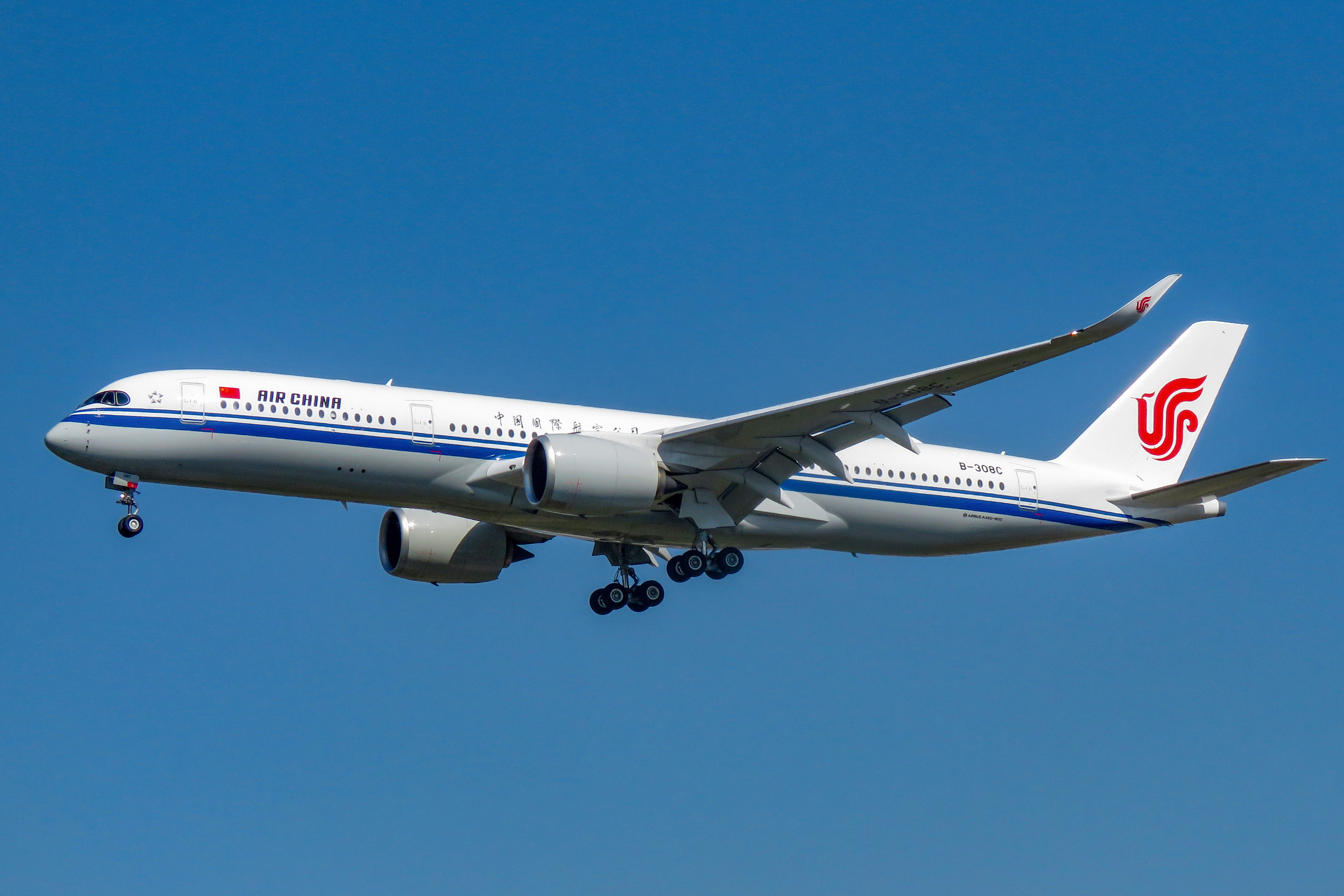
Airbus A350-900 in 2019

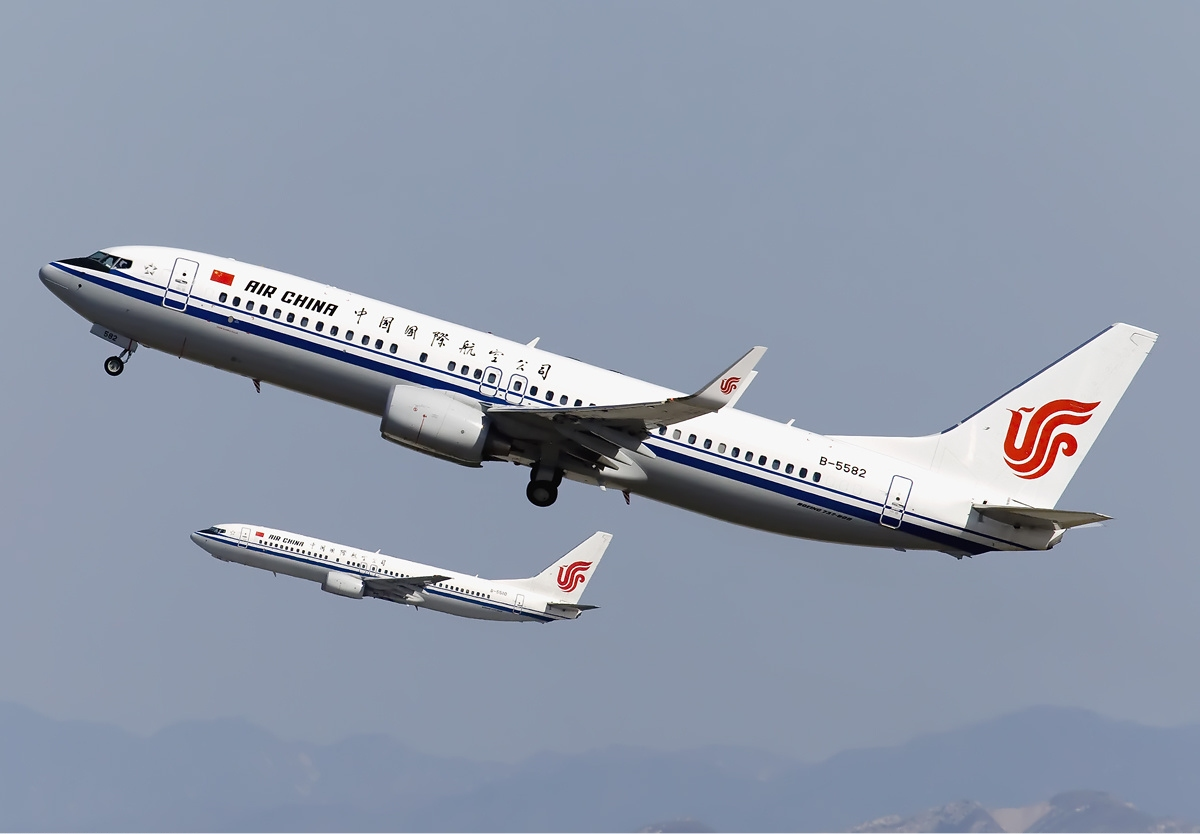
Boeing 737-800 in 2011

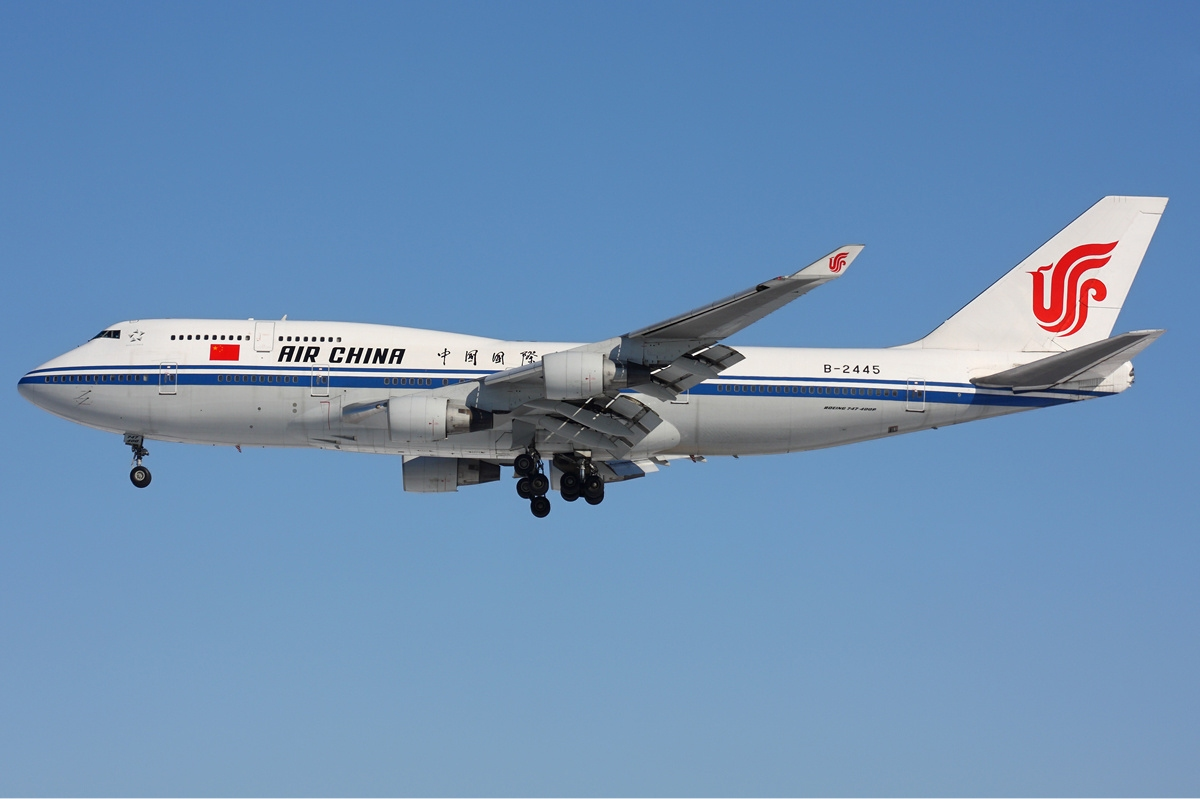
Boeing 747-400 in 2009

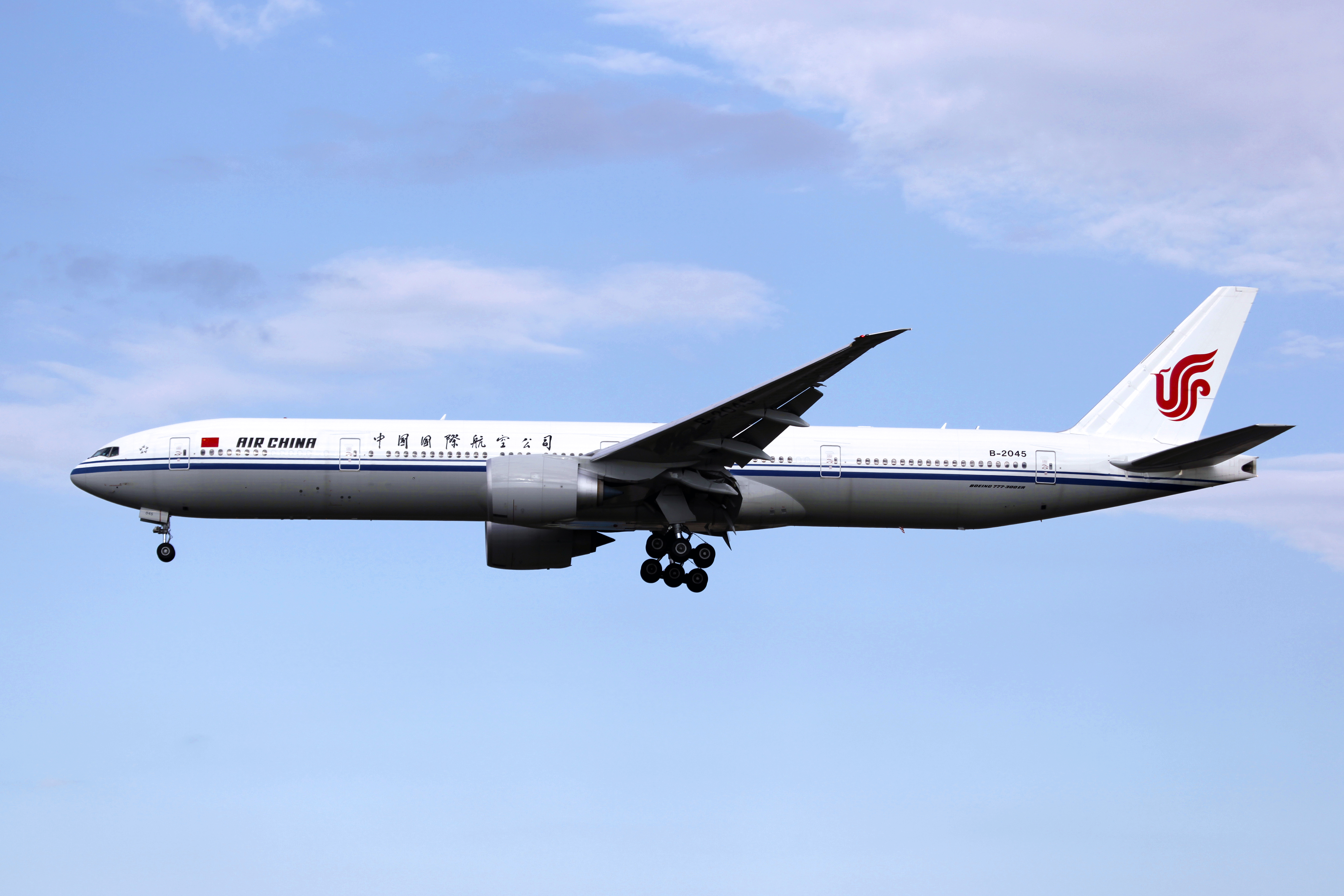
Boeing 777-300ER in 2014

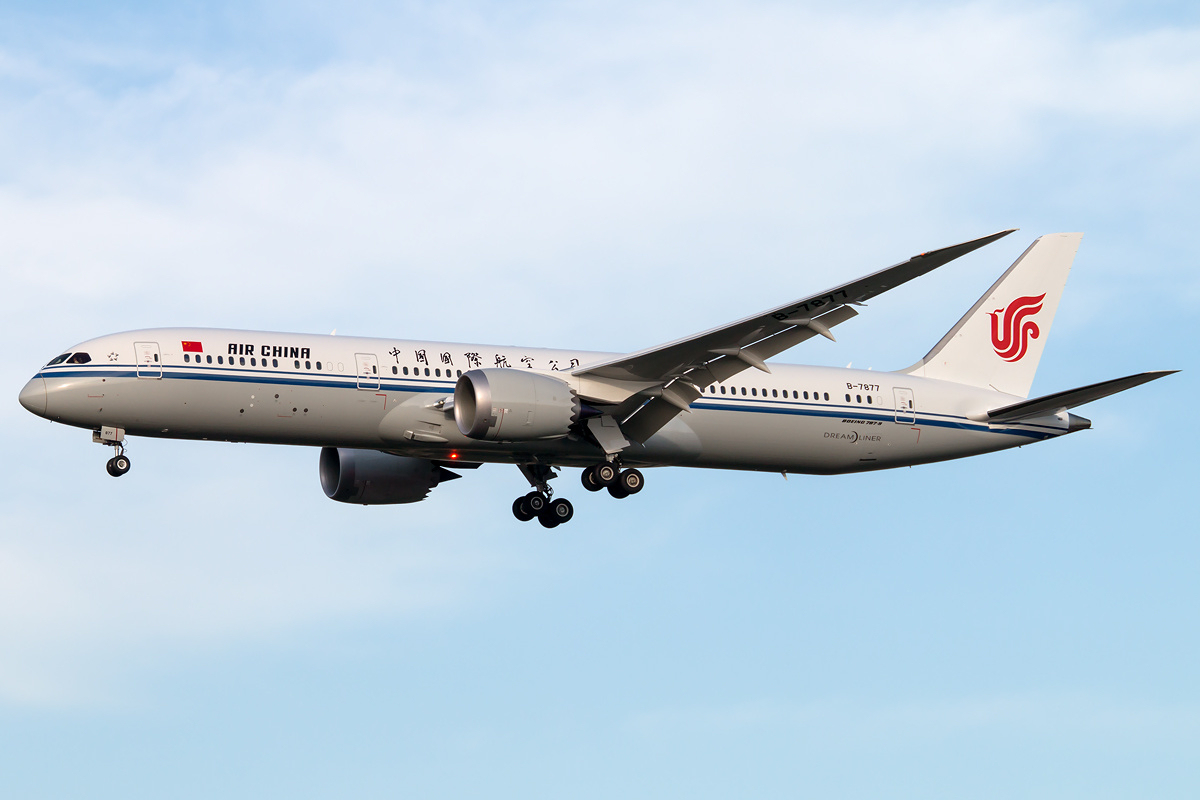
Boeing 787-9 in 2016

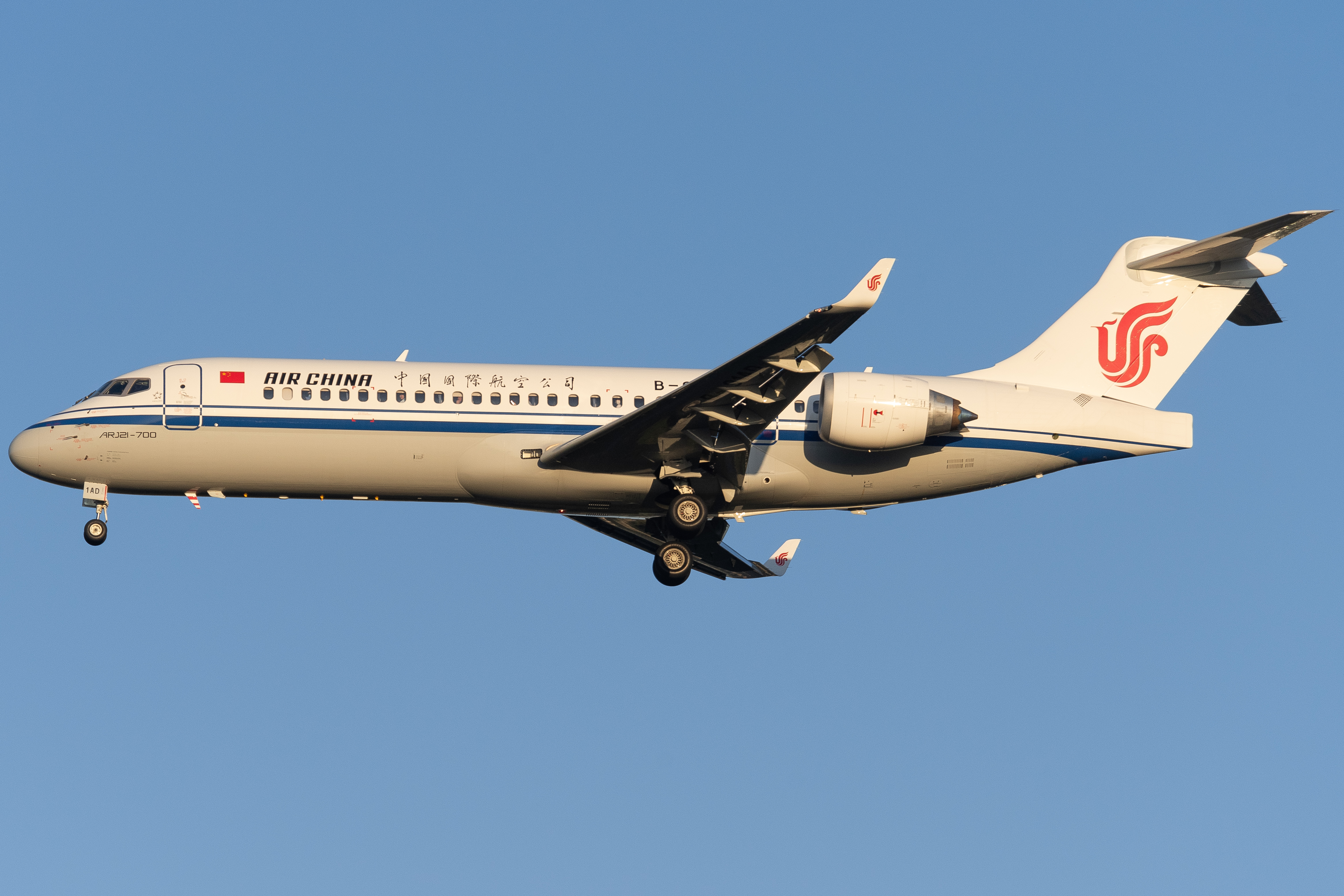
Comac C909 in 2023

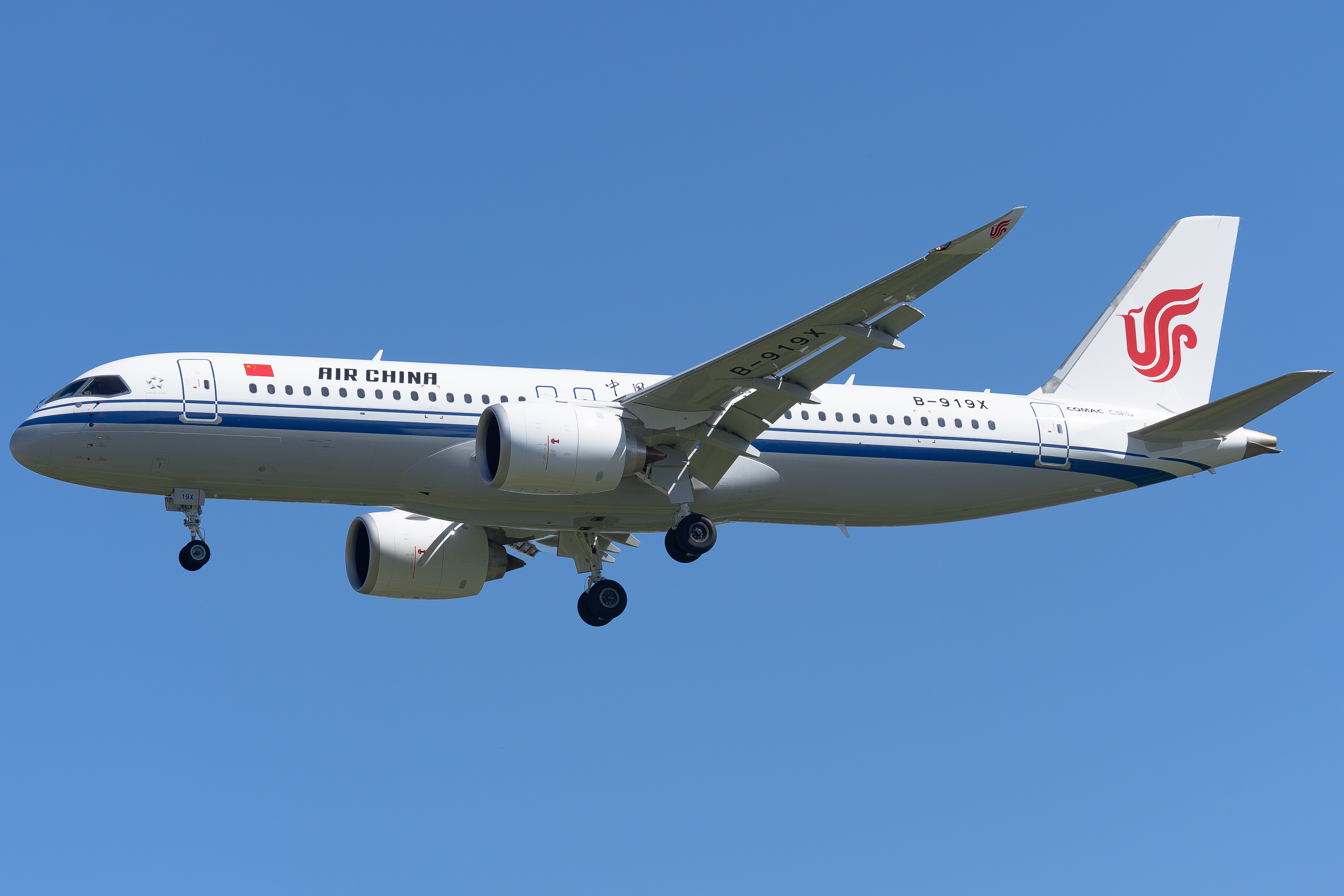
Comac C919-100ER in 2024

As of January 2026, Air China operates the following aircraft:

Air China fleet
| Aircraft | In service | Orders | Passengers | | | | | Notes |
| Aircraft | In service | Orders | F | J | Y+ | Y | Total | Notes |
|---|---|---|---|---|---|---|---|---|
| Airbus A319-100 | 19 | — | — | 8 | — | 120 | 128 | |
| Airbus A319neo | 8 | 2 | — | 8 | — | 120 | 128 | |
| Airbus A320-200 | 38 | — | — | 8 | — | 150 | 158 | |
| Airbus A320neo | 53 | 27 | — | 8 | — | 150 | 158 | |
| Airbus A321-200 | 61 | — | — | 16 | — | 161 | 177 | |
| Airbus A321-200 | 61 | — | — | 12 | — | 173 | 185 | |
| Airbus A321neo | 46 | 94 | — | 12 | — | 182 | 194 | |
| Airbus A321neo | 46 | 94 | — | 12 | — | 186 | 198 | |
| Airbus A330-200 | 15 | — | — | 30 | — | 207 | 237 | |
| Airbus A330-200 | 15 | — | — | 18 | — | 247 | 265 | |
| Airbus A330-200 | 15 | — | — | 12 | — | 271 | 283 | |
| Airbus A330-300 | 28 | — | — | 30 | 16 | 255 | 301 | |
| Airbus A330-300 | 28 | — | — | 36 | 20 | 255 | 311 | |
| Airbus A350-900 | 30 | 15 | — | 32 | 24 | 256 | 312 | Has two different Business Class seats. |
| Boeing 737-700 | 14 | — | — | 8 | — | 120 | 128 | |
| Boeing 737-800 | 98 | — | — | 12 | — | 147 | 159 | 3 aircraft operated by Beijing Airlines |
| Boeing 737-800 | 98 | — | — | 8 | — | 159 | 167 | 3 aircraft operated by Beijing Airlines |
| Boeing 737-800 | 98 | — | — | 8 | — | 168 | 176 | 3 aircraft operated by Beijing Airlines |
| Boeing 737 MAX 8 | 31 | — | — | 8 | — | 168 | 176 | |
| Boeing 747-400 | 2 | — | 10 | 42 | — | 292 | 344 | |
| Boeing 747-8I | 7 | — | 12 | 54 | 66 | 233 | 365 | B-2479 and B-2481 used for VIP transport. |
| Boeing 777-300ER | 28 | — | 8 | 42 | — | 261 | 311 | |
| Boeing 777-300ER | 28 | — | — | 36 | — | 356 | 392 | |
| Boeing 787-9 | 14 | — | — | 30 | 34 | 229 | 293 | |
| Comac C909 | 35 | — | — | — | — | 90 | 90 | |
| Comac C919-100ER | 9 | 99 | — | 8 | — | 150 | 158 | Deliveries from August 2024 until 2031. |
Air China Business Jets fleet
| Airbus ACJ319 | 1 | — | VIP | | | | | Operated by Beijing Airlines |
| Boeing BBJ1 | 1 | — | VIP | | | | | Operated by Beijing Airlines |
| Gulfstream G650ER | 1 | — | VIP | | | | | Operated by Beijing Airlines |
| Total | 539 | 222 | | | | | | |

In July 2026, Air China announced to order 15 Airbus A350-900 in a filing to the Shanghai stock exchange, the aircraft will be delivered between 2030 and 2032.

=== Former fleet ===
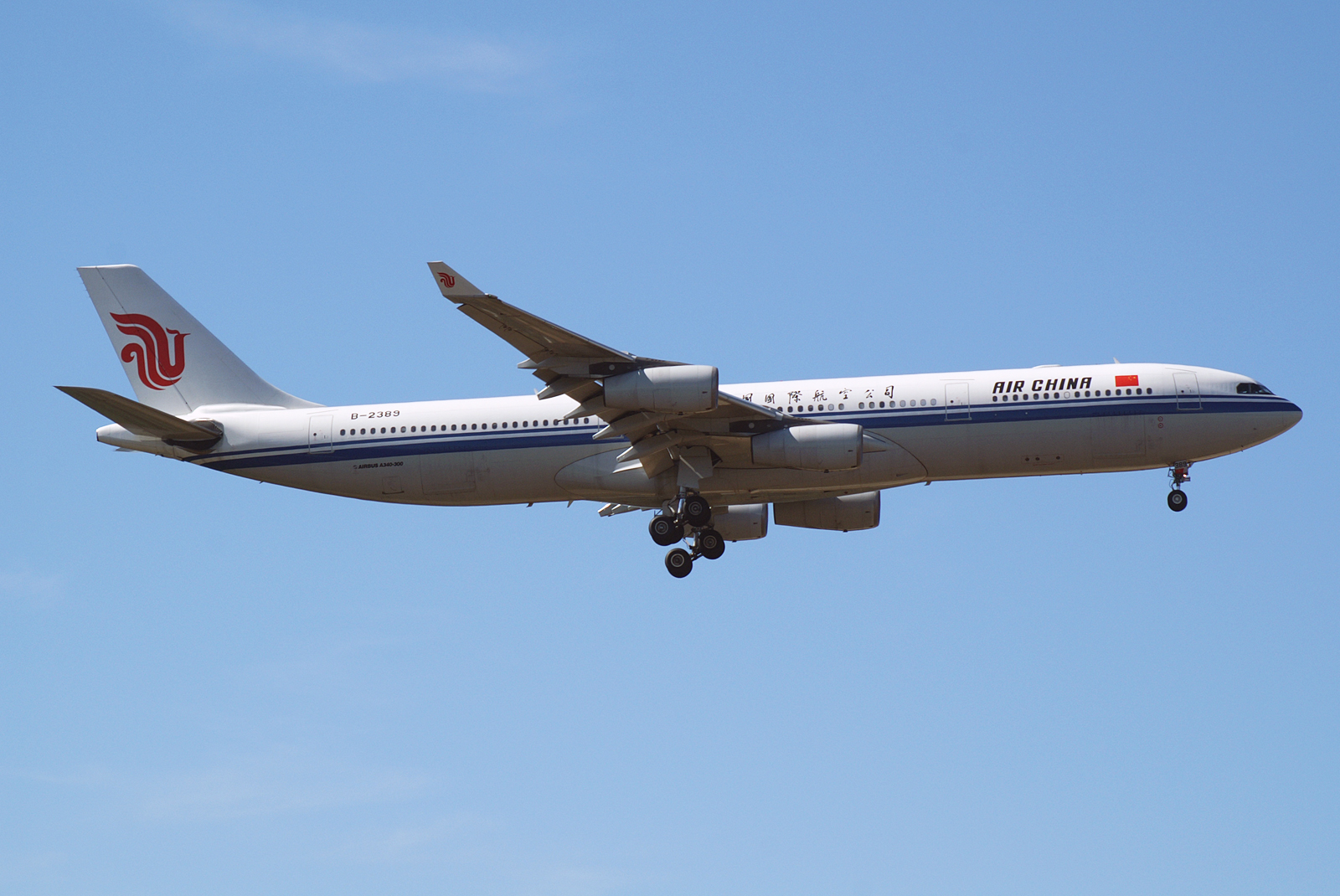
Airbus A340-300 in 2006

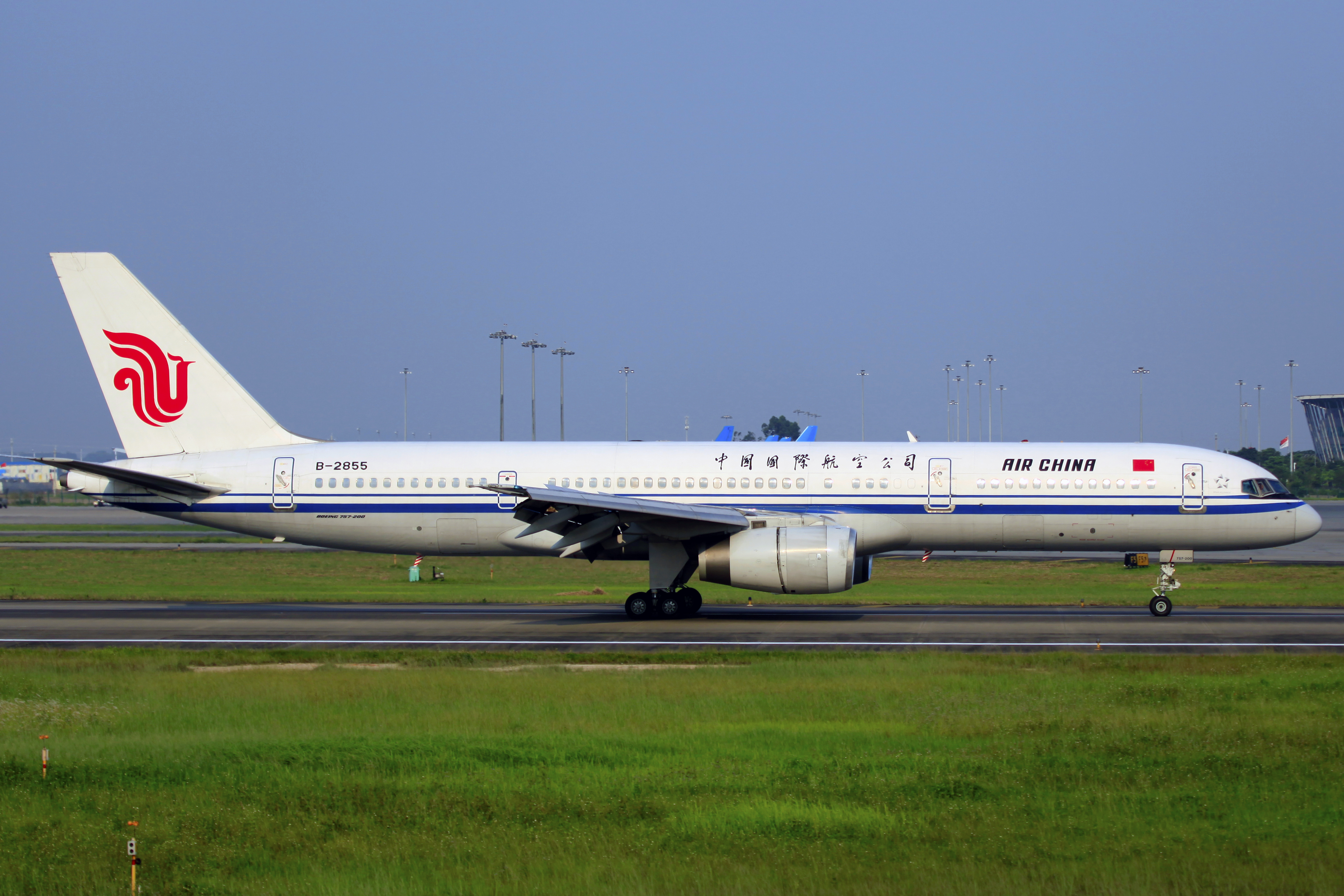
Boeing 757-200 in 2013

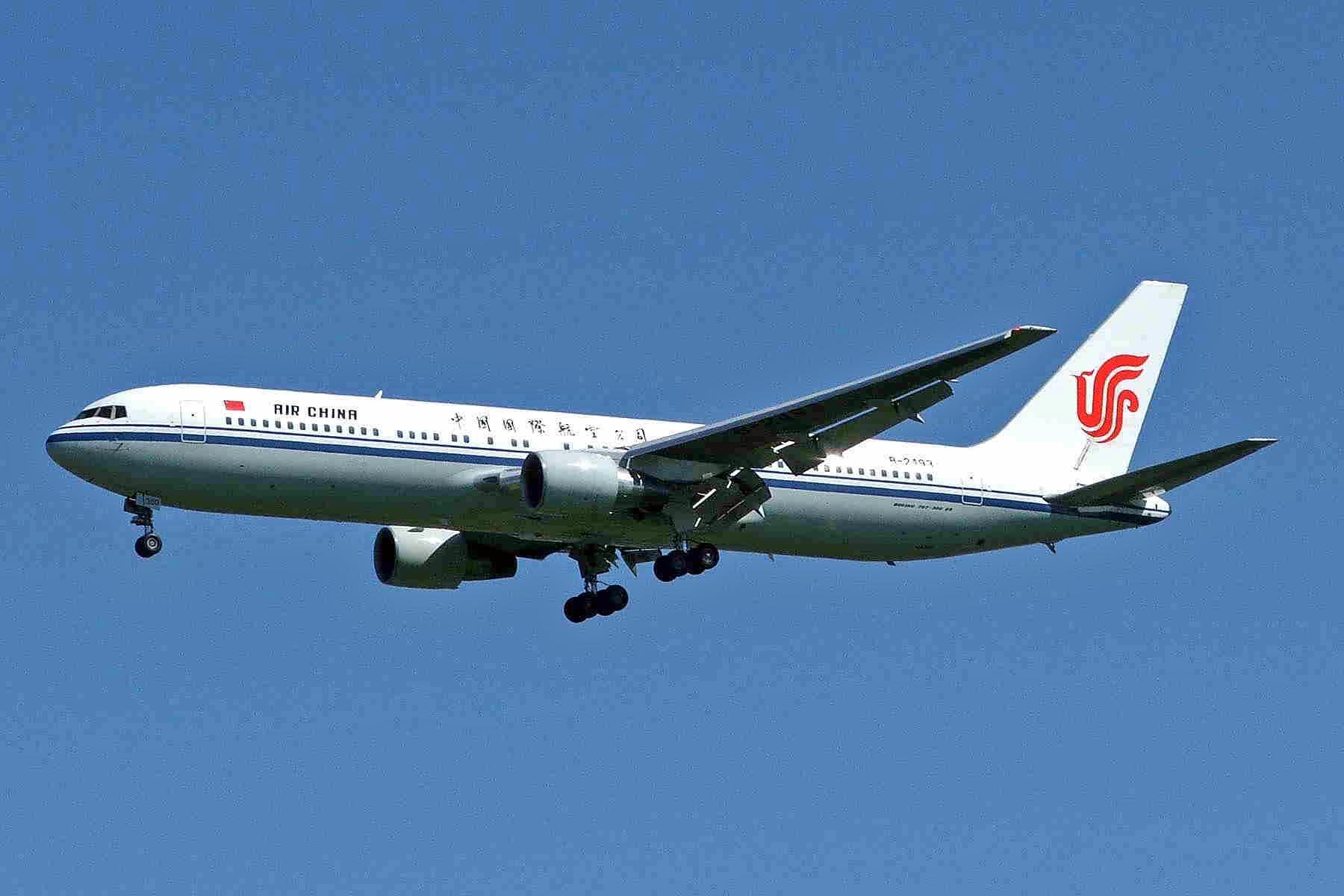
Boeing 767-300ER in 2012

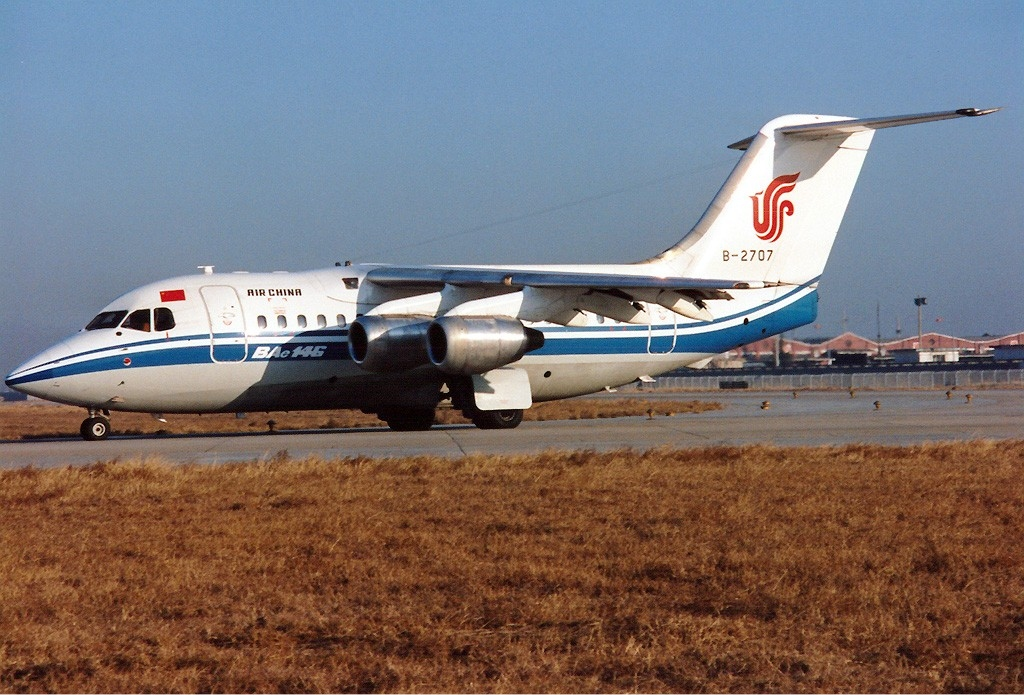
BAe 146-100 in 1995

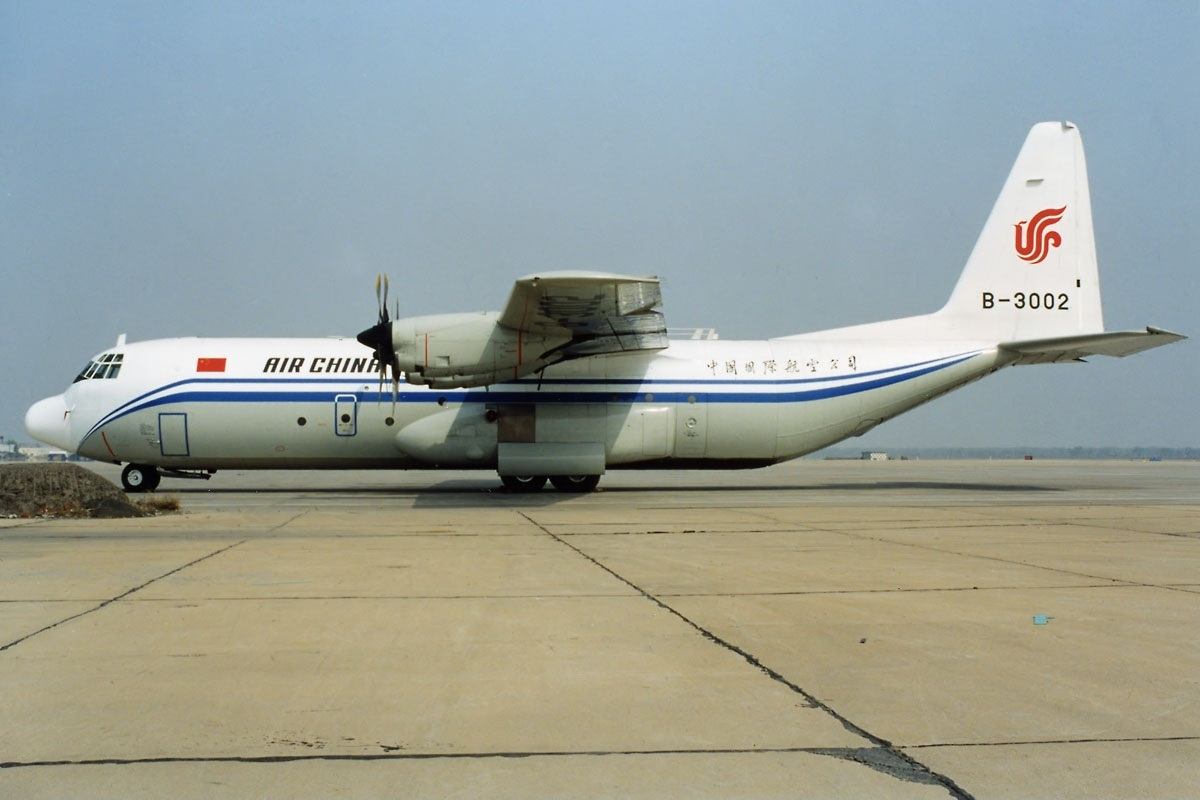
Lockheed L-100 Hercules in 1999

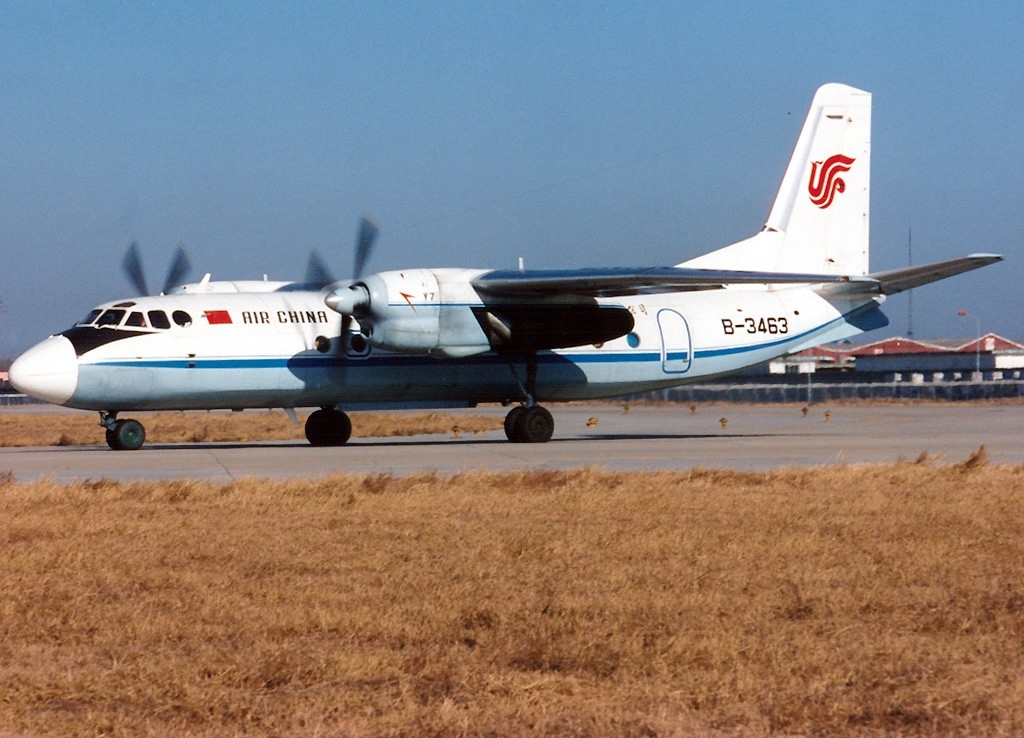
Xian Y-7 in 1995

Air China retired fleet
| Aircraft | Total | Introduced | Retired | Notes | Ref |
|---|---|---|---|---|---|
| Airbus A340-300 | 6 | 1997 | 2014 | | |
| Antonov An-12 | Unknown | Unknown | Unknown | | |
| BAe 146-100 | 4 | 1988 | 2008 | | |
| Boeing 707-320 | 6 | 1988 | 1993 | | |
| Boeing 737-200 | 4 | 1988 | 1995 | Disposed to Air Great Wall. | |
| Boeing 737-300 | 44 | 1988 | 2014 | | |
| Boeing 737-600 | 6 | 2003 | 2009 | | |
| Boeing 747-200M | 3 | 1988 | 2000 | Converted into freighters and transferred to Air China Cargo. | |
| Boeing 747-400M | 4 | 1989 | 2013 | | |
| Boeing 747-400M | 3 | 1989 | 2013 | Converted into freighters and transferred to Air China Cargo. | |
| Boeing 747SP | 4 | 1988 | 2000 | | |
| Boeing 757-200 | 9 | 2003 | 2013 | Converted into freighters and disposed to SF Airlines. | |
| Boeing 757-200 | 4 | 2003 | 2013 | Converted into freighters and transferred to Air China Cargo. | |
| Boeing 767-200ER | 5 | 1988 | 2009 | | |
| Boeing 767-300 | 4 | 1993 | 2012 | | |
| Boeing 767-300ER | 5 | 2003 | 2012 | | |
| Boeing 777-200 | 10 | 1998 | 2018 | | |
| Hawker Siddeley Trident | 5 | 1988 | 1991 | | |
| Lockheed L-100 Hercules | Unknown | Unknown | Unknown | | |
| Xian Y-7 | 3 | 1988 | 1996 | | |
Air China Business Jets retired fleet
| Bombardier Global Express XRS | 1 | Unknown | Unknown | Operated by Beijing Airlines | |
| Dassault Falcon 7X | Unknown | Unknown | 2023 | Operated by Beijing Airlines | |
| Gulfstream G550 | 1 | Unknown | 2024 | Operated by Beijing Airlines | |
| Gulfstream IV | Unknown | Unknown | Unknown | Operated by Beijing Airlines | |
| Learjet 45 | 1 | 2004 | 2007 | | |

== Services ==
=== Cabin ===
==== Forbidden Pavilion ====
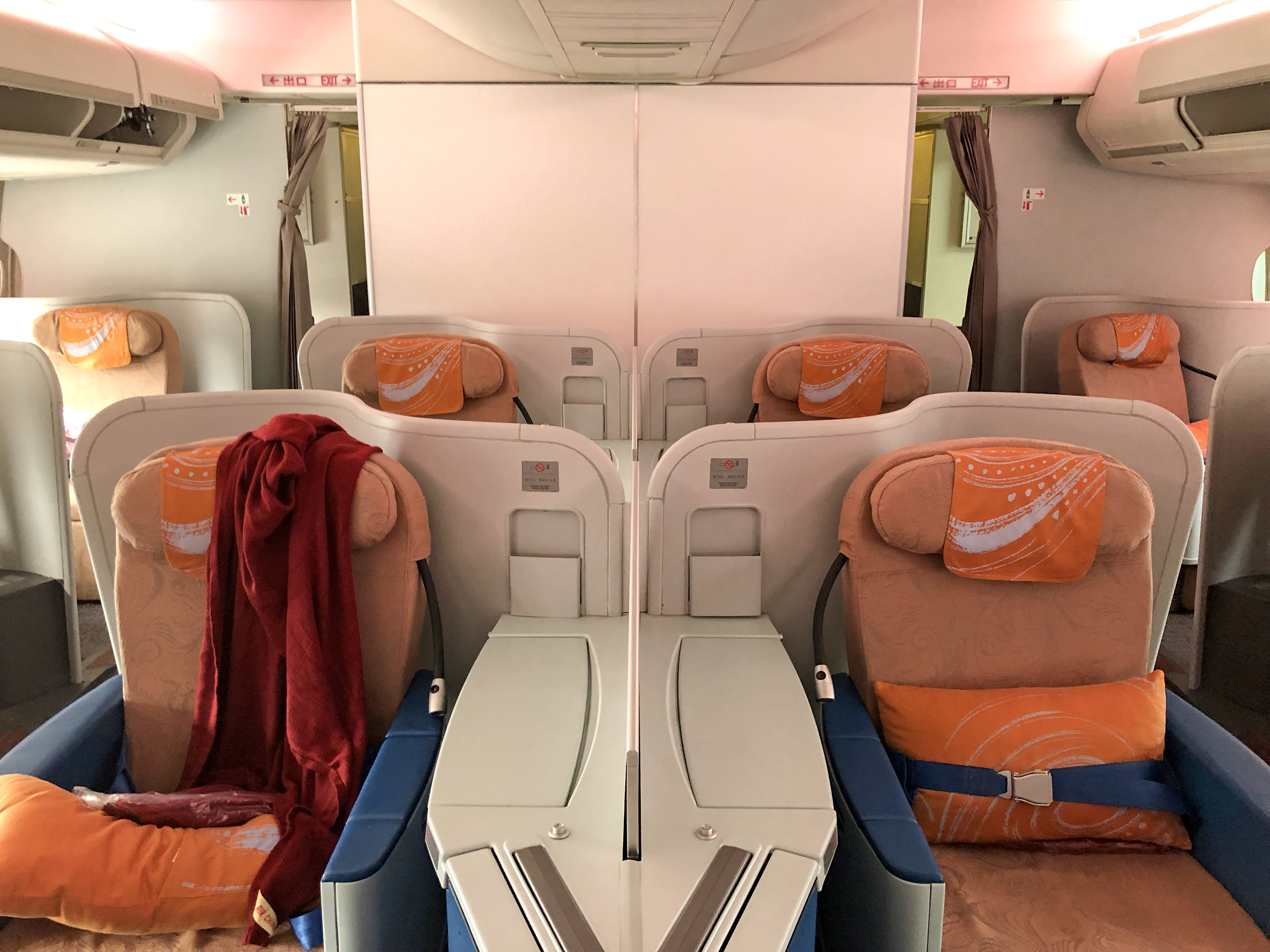
Forbidden Pavilion on a Boeing 747-400

Forbidden Pavilion is Air China's first class, and is offered on all Boeing 747-400, Boeing 747-8 and some Boeing 777-300ER.

The Forbidden Pavilion on the Boeing 777-300ER and 747-8 is Air China's latest flagship product, featuring Zodiac Aerospace Venus suites featuring a row pitch of 82-83 inches, and a seat width of 23 inches. The seat also features 23 inch AVODs and also has Universal AC and USB-A sockets available.

Forbidden Pavilion on the 747-400 has 80-inch (203 cm) seat pitch, swiveling seat power, and fully flat bed recline. First Class on the 747-400 is one of two classes that sports AVOD screens. It is named Forbidden Pavilion due to its place in the cabin.

==== Capital Pavilion ====
Capital Pavilion is Air China's business class, and is offered on all Air China aircraft, excluding the Comac C909-700.

On Air China's narrow-body fleet, business class seats are recliners arranged in a 2-2 configuration.

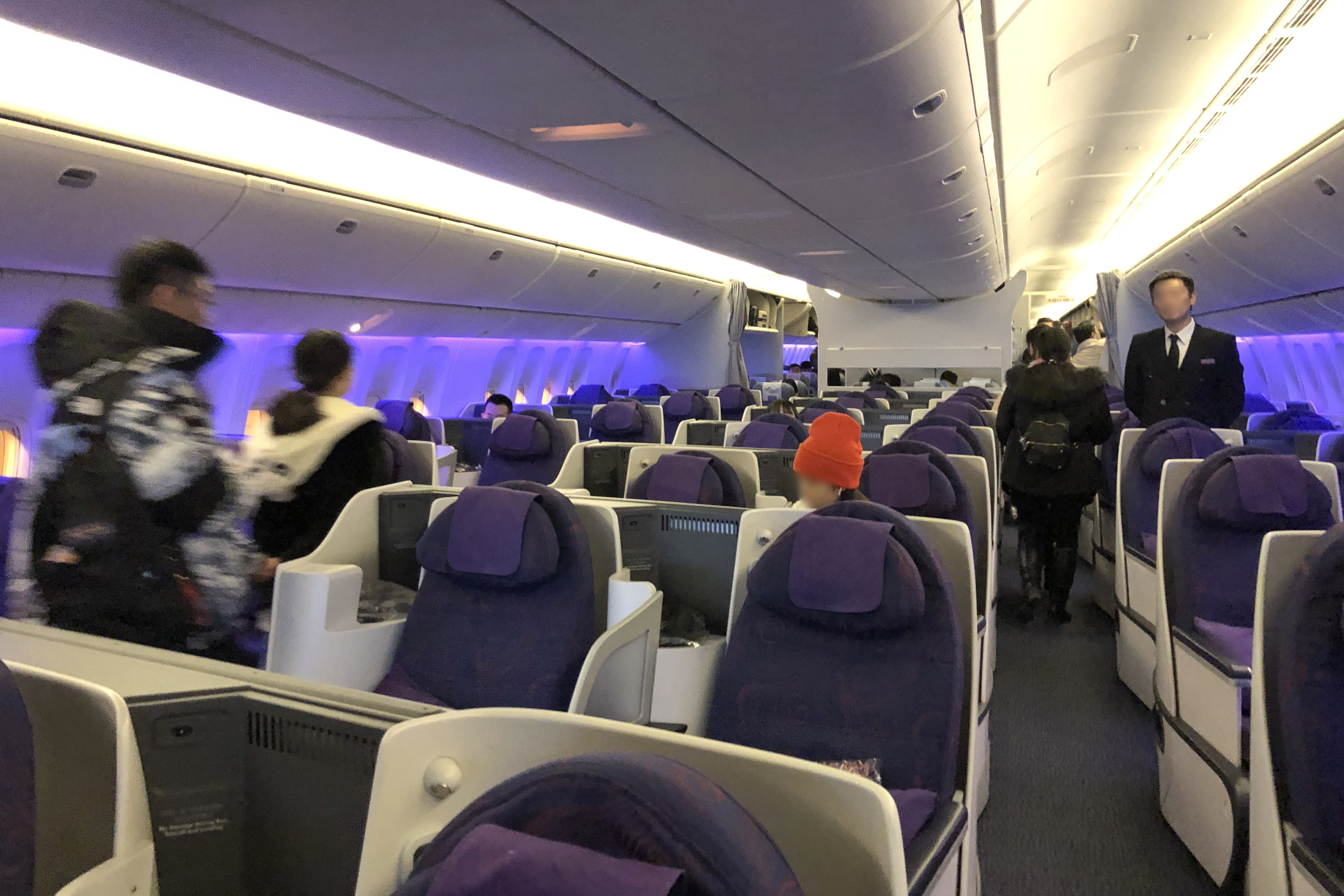

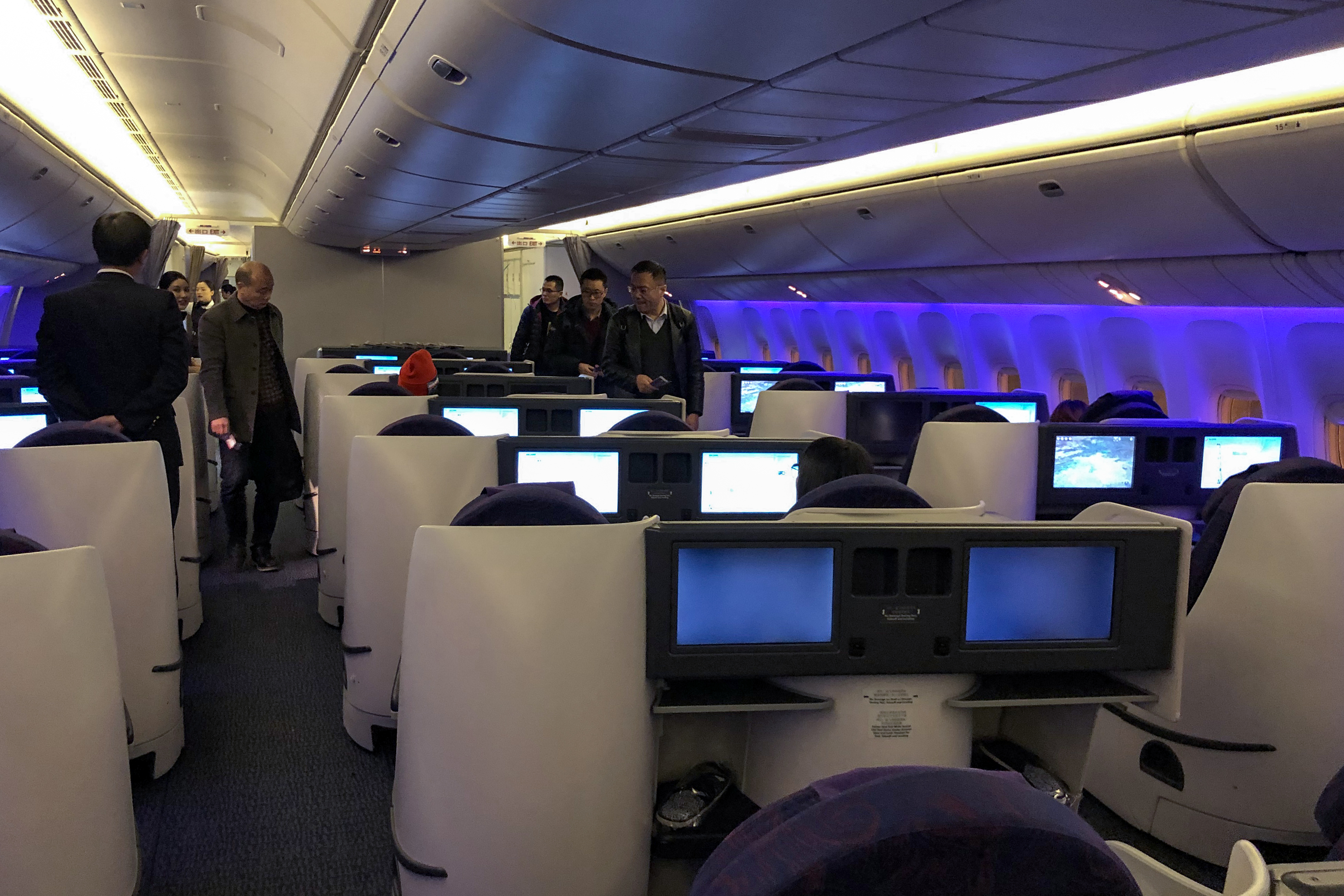
Capital Pavillion on an Air China Boeing 777-300ER. Similar seats are used on Air China's Boeing 747-8s and 787s.

On the Boeing 747-8, Boeing 777-300ER and Boeing 787, the Capital Pavilion would be located at the front of the cabin in a 2-2-2 configuration. They feature Collins Parallel Diamond seats, which can convert into a 6'-4" lie-flat bed. The seats have a width of 21 inches, and also feature a 15-16 inch touchscreen along with Universal AC and USB-A sockets. On the Boeing 747s, Capital Pavilion is located in the nose of the aircraft and the Upper Deck, with a painted collage of the Summer Palace, which symbolizes good luck in China. On the Boeing 747-400, the seats have partial recline, with a touch-screen function and remote function IFE screen on the back of seats and also located in the armrests. It was located in a 2-2-2 configuration at the back, with 2-2 rows continuing to the front and on the Upper Deck. These seats feature seat-back AVOD screens.

The Capital Pavilion on the Airbus A330 would be located in a small area at the front of the cabin. On newer A330s, they feature Zodiac Aura Lite, which consists of rectangle-like seats, with two reading lights located between seats in a 2-2-2 configuration and seat-back screens would be provided. These seats provide full recline and can convert into a 6'-4" lie-flat bed. The seats also have a row pitch of 79 inches, a seat width of 21 inches, and also features a 15-inch touch screen display, as well as Universal AC and USB-A sockets. On older A330s, the screens would be smaller and there would be no storage space between screens, and a recline of 165 degrees.

The Airbus A350 features Air China's latest product. On older A350s, the seats feature a reverse herringbone Collins Aerospace Super-Diamond seat arrangement at the front of the cabin in 8 1-2-1 configured rows. The seats would be full flat reclinable, along with a shoulder belt for safety. There are no mid-overhead bins, allowing the cabin to look and feel bigger. There would also be aisle access to all seats, and 18-inch HD IFE screens. On newer Airbus A350s, the cabin features Recaro CL6720 seats arranged in a 1-2-1 configuration. The seats can convert to a 6'-4" lie-flat bed, and have a seat width of 21 inches. Each seat features an 18-inch HD touch screen display and Universal AC and USB-A sockets.

==== Premium Economy Class ====
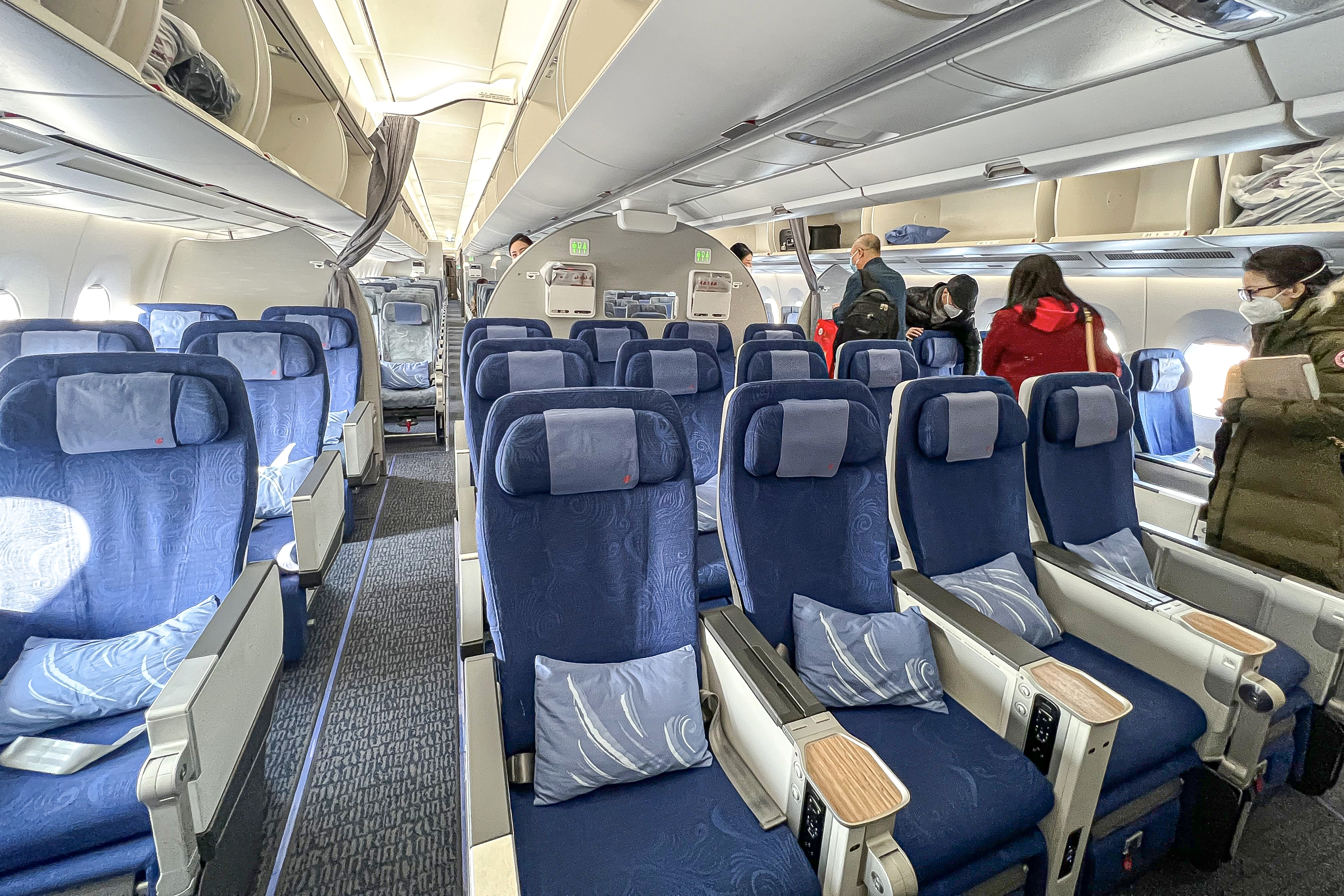
Air China Premium Economy on an Airbus A350-900

Premium economy is offered on all of Air China's Airbus A330-300, Airbus A350-900, Boeing 747-8 and Boeing 787-9 aircraft. The Premium Economy class on the A350-900 is the newest product, with extra recline, a seat pitch of 38.5-39 inches and a seat width of 18.5 inches, in a 2-4-2 configuration. Premium Economy on A330-300s, 747-8s and 787-9s have a seat pitch of 36-38 inches and a width of 17.1-18 inches. In older A330s, these seats also featured AVOD screens and headrests, which the Economy Class did not.

==== Economy Class ====
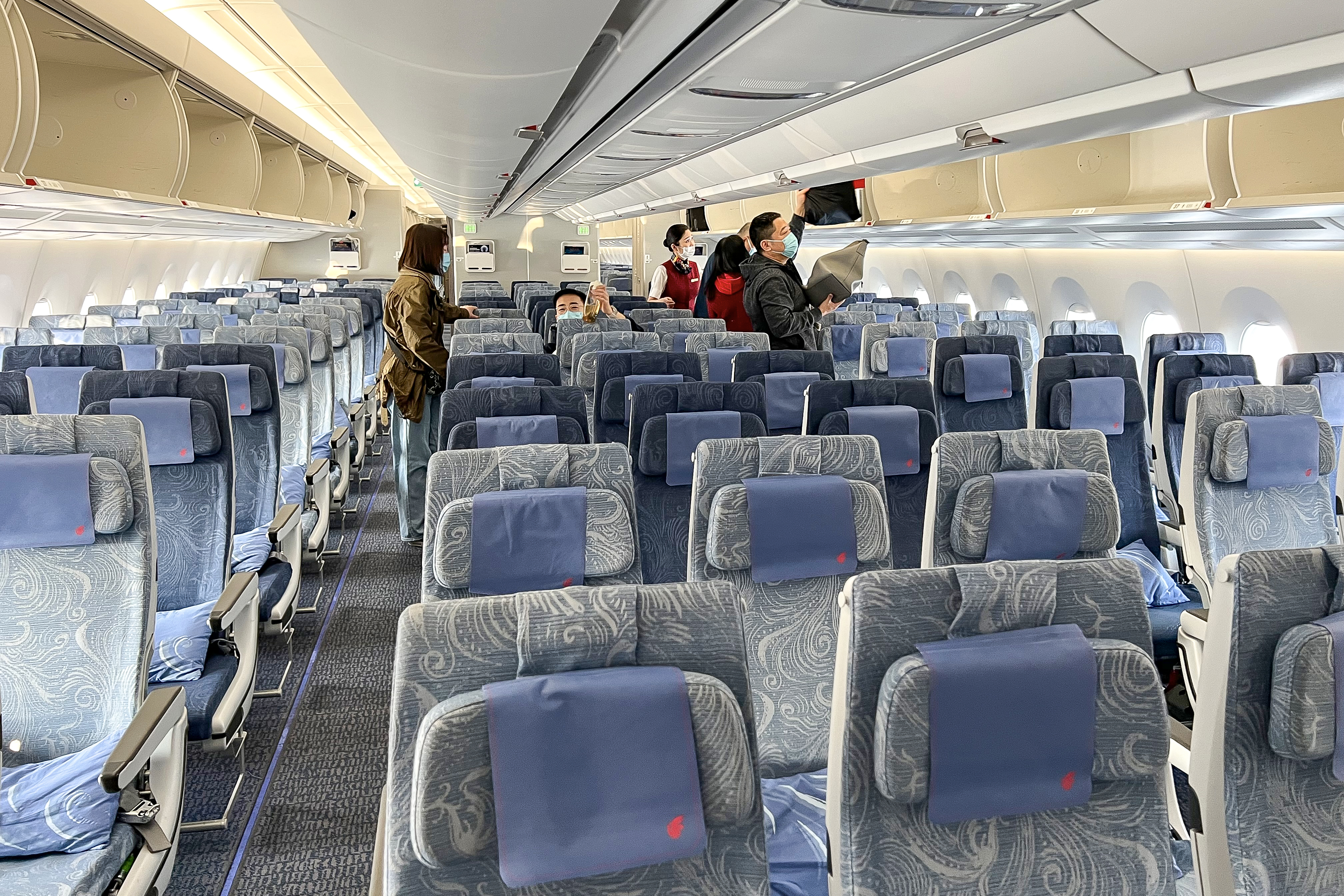

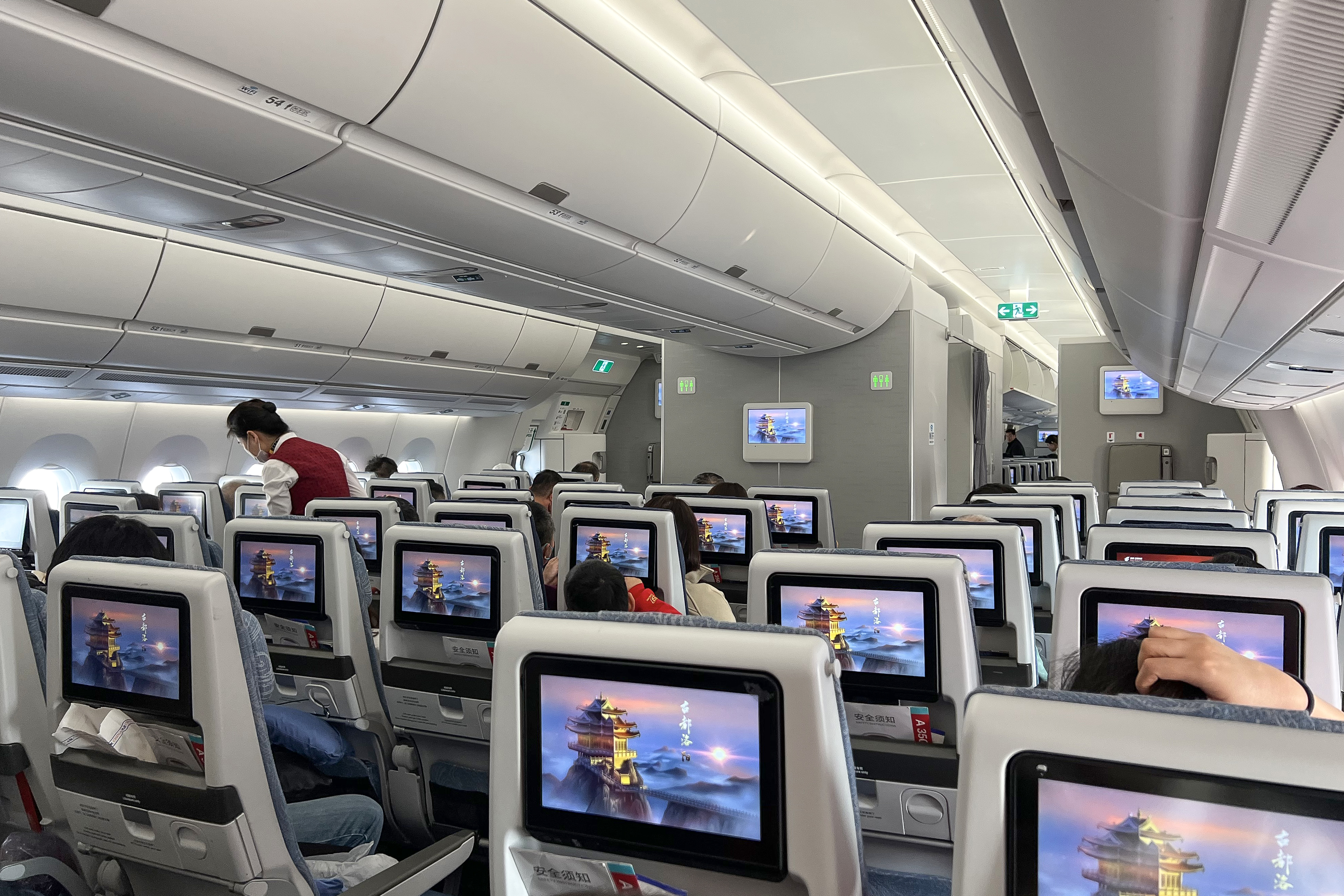
Economy class cabin on an Airbus A350-900.

Economy class is offered on all Air China aircraft. IFE with AVOD functionality is available on Boeing 777-300ER, Boeing 787-9, Airbus A350-900, Boeing 747 and newer Airbus A330 aircraft with different screen sizes and different systems from Panasonic and Thales. Universal power port and USB availability is different upon aircraft. Seats typically have a seat pitch of 31 inches, and a width of 17-18 inches, depending on aircraft. On Airbus A330s, economy class is in a 2-4-2 configuration, whilst on Airbus A350s and Boeing 787s, a 3-3-3 configuration is present. Boeing 747s and 777s have a 3-4-3 configuration. All narrowbody jets are configured in a 3-3 configuration except for the Comac ARJ21s, which have a 3-2 configuration.

=== PhoenixMiles ===
PhoenixMiles (Chinese: 凤凰知音; pinyin: feng huang zhī yīn, literally "Phoenix Spirit/Soulmate") is the frequent flyer program of Air China and its subsidiary Air China Inner Mongolia, Air Macau, Beijing Airlines, Dalian Airlines, Kunming Airlines, Shandong Airlines and Shenzhen Airlines. This is the first frequent flyer program launched in mainland China. It was designed to reward frequent flyers traveling internationally and domestically with Air China and its partner airlines.

== Cargo ==
Air China Cargo, is a subsidiary of Air China, that focuses on freight delivery and does not transport passengers. It operates routes across Asia, Europe and North America with its fleet of Airbus A330-200/P2F, Boeing 747-400F and Boeing 777F.

== Accidents and incidents ==
- On 15 April 2002, Air China Flight 129, a Boeing 767-200ER from Beijing to Busan, South Korea, crashed into a hill while trying to land at Gimhae International Airport during inclement weather, killing 129 of the 166 people on board.
- On 27 August 2019, Air China Flight 183, an Airbus A330-343X from Beijing to Tokyo, Japan, was damaged beyond repair due to a cargo fire while on the ground at Beijing just shortly before departure. No one was injured.

== Controversies and passenger incidents ==
=== Wings of China incident ===
Air China's inflight magazine Wings of China faced accusations of racism when they stated "London is generally a safe place to travel, however precautions are needed when entering areas mainly populated by Indians, Pakistanis, and black people." in their September 2016 issue. On 8 September 2016, Air China issued an apology. Air China Media, which publishes the Wings of China magazine, said it wished to apologise to "readers and passengers who are feeling uncomfortable". It added: "This invariably inappropriate description... was purely a work mistake by the editors and it's not the magazine's views... We will immediately recall this entire issue of magazines and draw lessons from this incident."

=== Use of Russian airspace ===
Due to the war in Ukraine and sanctions against Russia, European carriers have ceased to use Russian airspace, significantly increasing the length, and therefore cost, of their flights to and from China. Air China continues to operate flights to and from Russia and this strategy has bolstered its dominance in the China–Europe market, but brought accusations of unfair competition.

== See also ==
- Aviation industry in the People's Republic of China
- List of airlines of the People's Republic of China
- List of airports in the People's Republic of China
- List of companies of the People's Republic of China
- Transportation in the People's Republic of China
