= Air China Inner Mongolia =

Chinese regional airline

Air China Inner Mongolia Co., Ltd

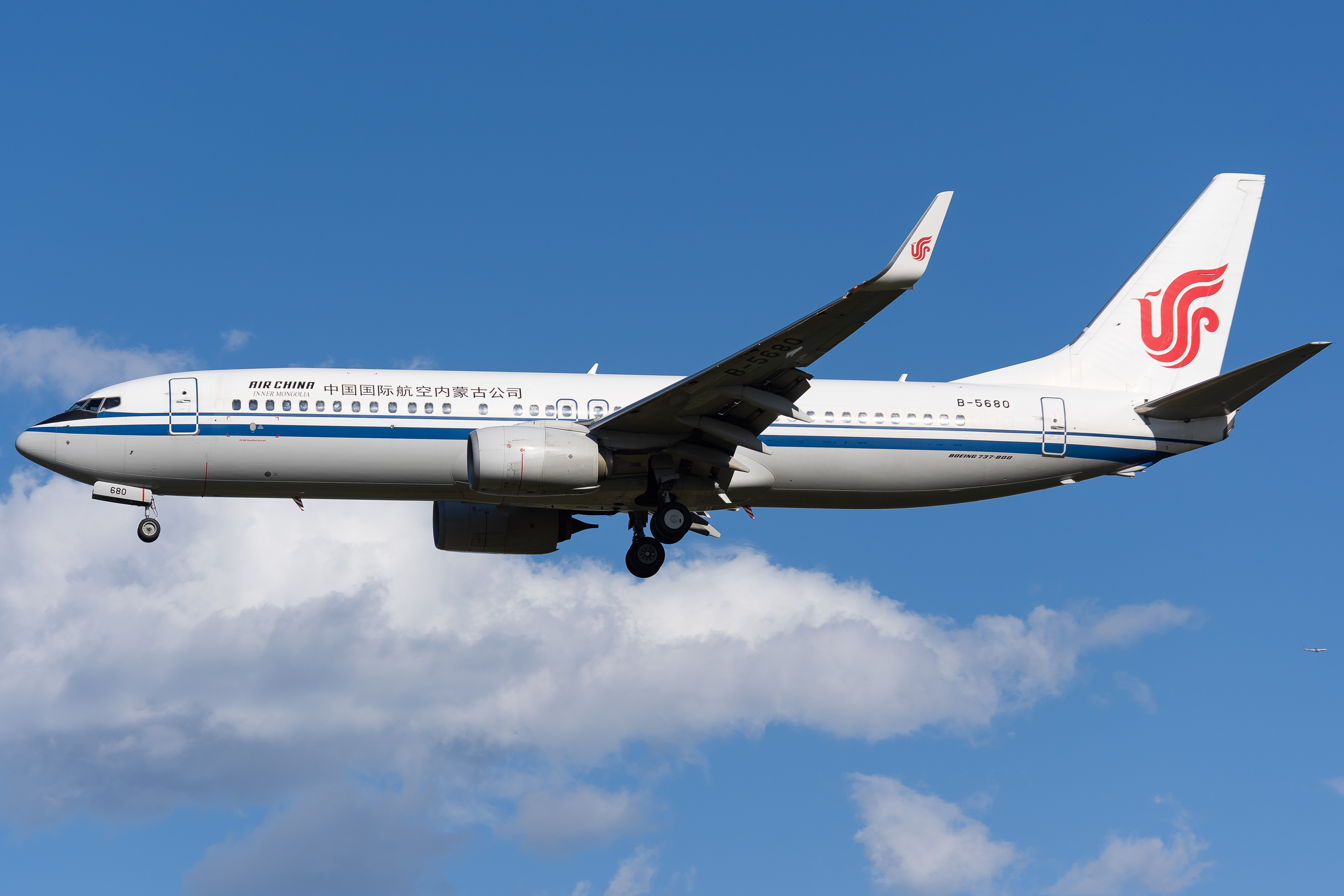
IATA	ICAO	Call sign
CA	CMN	MENGYUA
- Founded: 23 August 2013; 12 years ago
- Commenced operations: 8 January 2014; 12 years ago
- Ceased operations: 15 October 2025; 7 months ago (re-integrated into Air China)
- Hubs: Hohhot Baita International Airport
- Frequent-flyer program: PhoenixMiles
- Alliance: Star Alliance (affiliate)
- Fleet size: 8
- Destinations: 19
- Parent company: Air China (80%); Inner Mongolia State-owned Capital Management Co., Ltd (20%)
- Headquarters: Hohhot Baita International Airport
- Key people: Wang Yingnian (chairman)
- Website: www.airchinaim.com

Air China Inner Mongolia Co., Ltd, branded as Air China Inner Mongolia, was a regional airline in Inner Mongolia, China, with its corporate base in Hohhot Baita International Airport. It was a state-owned airline owned by Air China (80%) and Inner Mongolia State-owned Capital Management Co., Ltd (20%). In 2019, Air China Inner Mongolia had 19 destinations, mostly in China. It had an all-Boeing 737 fleet of 8 that consisted of Boeing 737-700 and 737-800 aircraft. The airline was founded in 2012 by Air China, serving as a regional branch that increased Air China's presence in Inner Mongolia. The airline's chairman was Wang Yingnian, serving as Chief Pilot of Air China since 2014.

== History ==
Air China Inner Mongolia was founded on 23 August 2013 as a 1 billion yuan joint venture between Air China (80%) and Inner Mongolia State-owned Capital Management. On 31 December 2013, Air China Inner Mongolia received its first aircraft, a Boeing 737-700. On 8 January 2014, the airline commenced operations with its first flight, CA 1102, from Hohhot Baita International Airport, its operation base and hub, to Beijing Capital International Airport. On 30 May 2014, the airline received its first Boeing 737-800 aircraft, for the purpose to expand on routes to Beijing Capital, Chifeng, Changsha Huanghua, Haikou, Wuhan, and Xiamen. On 15 October 2025, Air China Inner Mongolia was re-integrated into Air China, becoming a branch of the national carrier.

== Destinations ==
Air China Inner Mongolia had a total of 19 destinations.

=== Codeshare ===
Air China Inner Mongolia had codeshare agreements with Air China.

== Fleet ==
=== Current fleet ===
At the time of cessation, Air China Inner Mongolia operated the following aircraft:

Air China Inner Mongolia Fleet
Aircraft	In Fleet	Orders	Passengers			Notes
Aircraft	In Fleet	Orders	J	Y	Total	Notes
Boeing 737-700	1	—	8	120	128	
Boeing 737-800	7	—	8	159	167	
Boeing 737-800	7	—	8	168	176	
Total	8	—				

=== Livery ===
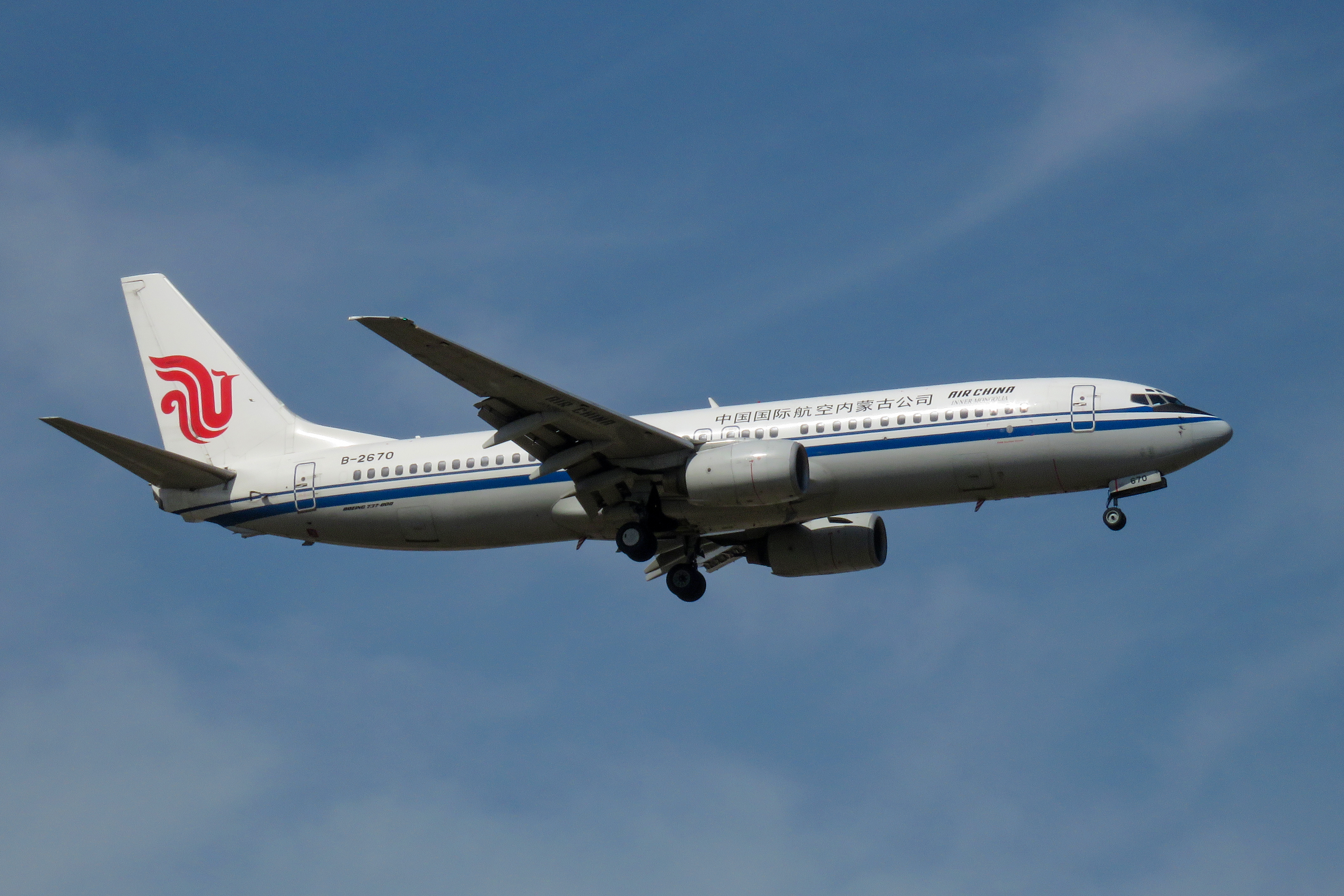
Air China Inner Mongolia Boeing 737-800 aircraft wearing its standard livery (B-2670)

The airline's livery was the standard Air China livery, except that the words "Air China Inner Mongolia" and "中國國際航空內蒙古有限公司" were painted above the windows.

==== Special Liveries ====
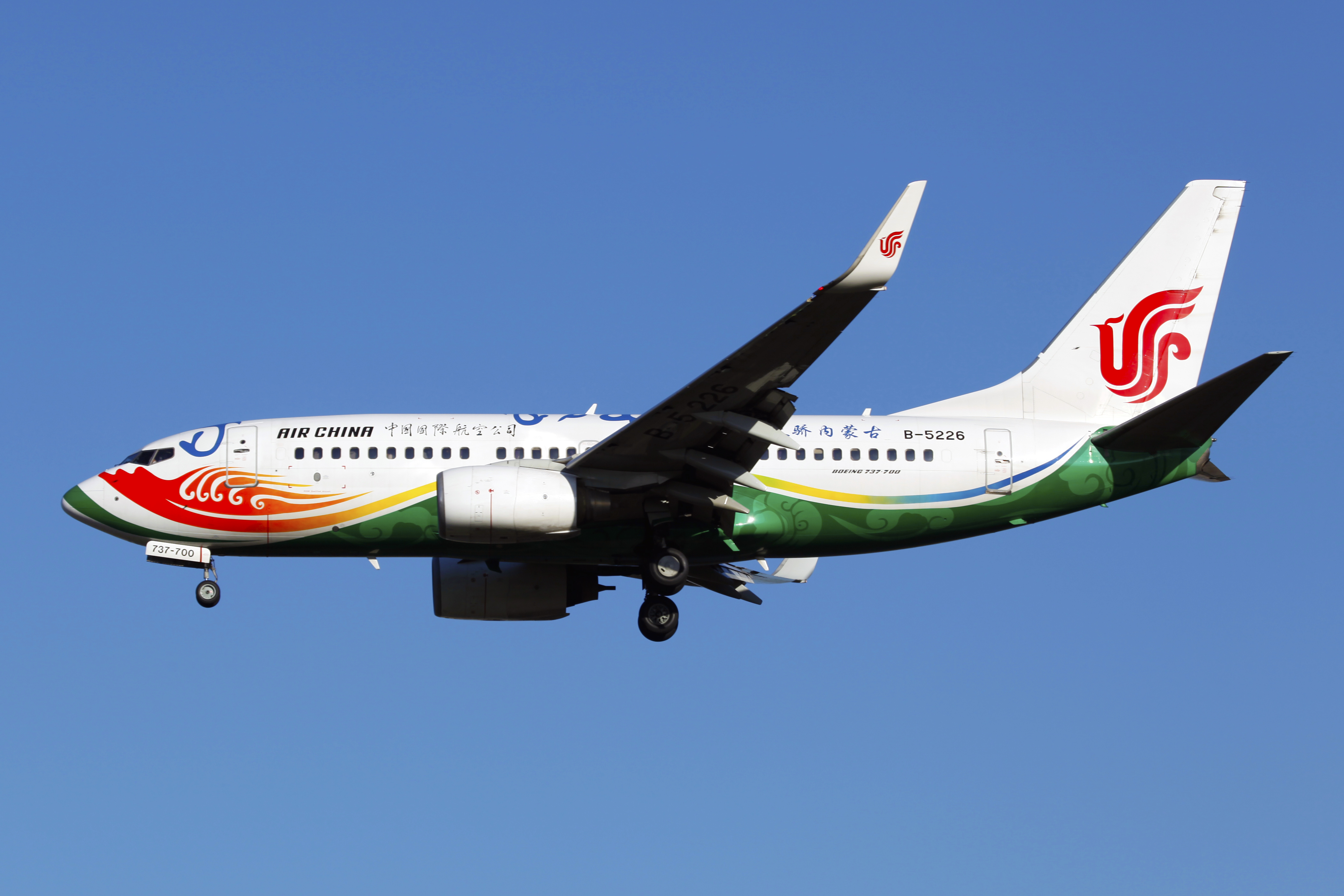
Air China Inner Mongolia Boeing 737-700 aircraft wearing Neimenggu Livery (B-5226)

Neimenggu Livery

The Neimenggu Livery was painted on the first aircraft received by the airline, B-5226, a Boeing 737-700. Its upper fuselage didn't have any difference with the standard livery, but the blue cheatline was replaced with colourful streamlines. The words "天傲內蒙古" (literal meaning: Pride of the sky of Inner Mongolia) were painted on the rear fuselage above the windows.

== Service ==
Air China Inner Mongolia offered two classes of service: First Class and Economy class on all Boeing 737-800 aircraft. There was a typical configuration of 8 First Class Recliner seats, with the remaining seats standard economy.

== Loyalty Programme ==
The airline shared the loyalty program with its parent company, Air China, PhoenixMiles. Passengers on Air China Inner Mongolia could accumulate miles.
