= Kunpeng =

Kunpeng may refer to:

- Kun and Peng, two forms of a creature from Chinese mythology
- Kunpeng Airlines, former name of Henan Airlines, charter airline based in northern China
- Kunpeng 920 (Huawei Kunpeng 920), ARM-based server CPU produced by HiSilicon (7nm process)
- Xi'an Y-20 Kunpeng, a Chinese military transport aircraft

== See also ==
- Kunpengopterus
