= Henan Airlines =

Regional airline based in northern China

Henan Airlines 河南航空
IATA	ICAO	Call sign
VD	KPA	KUN PENG
- Founded: 2006
- Commenced operations: October 2007
- Ceased operations: 27 August 2013
- Hubs: Zhengzhou Xinzheng International Airport
- Fleet size: 4
- Destinations: -
- Parent company: Shenzhen Airlines (51%)
- Headquarters: Zhengzhou
- Website: none

Henan Airlines (Chinese: 河南航空; pinyin: Hénán Hángkōng), formerly Kunpeng Airlines (Chinese: 鲲鹏航空公司; pinyin: Kūnpéng Hángkōng Gōngsī), was a charter airline based in northern China. The airline was founded as a joint venture between Shenzhen Airlines and Mesa Air Group and was also the largest sino-foreign regional airline in China. In 2009 Mesa Air Group and Shenzhen terminated their agreement and Shenzhen announced that the airline would be renamed Henan Airlines.

== History ==
The agreement to form Kunpeng Airlines was signed in December 2006, with service beginning in October 2007. Kunpeng operated passenger and cargo services, and charter flights. The airline began flying Bombardier CRJ200 aircraft leased from Mesa Air Group. The airline's livery was made up of red, white, and gold. The airline's name is derived from a mythical Chinese bird.

In August 2008, Kunpeng moved its headquarters and operating base to Zhengzhou. Kunpeng was operating at a financial loss, and it was hoped that the move would bring the airline into profitability. Kungpeng had planned on having 200 aircraft operating 900 daily flights by 2016.

In August 2008, Mesa Air Group stated that it intended to sell all of its shares in Kunpeng to its partner Shenzhen Airlines. In June 2009, Mesa Air Group sold its financial stake in Kunpeng Airlines and all its leased CRJ 200s were returned to the US.

In 2009, Shenzhen Airlines announced that Kunpeng Airlines would be renamed Henan Airlines, operating Embraer E-190 aircraft.

On August 27, 2010, Henan provincial authorities revoked the company name "Henan Airlines" that it had previously approved, citing the bad reputation the airline had brought to the province in the aftermath of Henan Airlines Flight 8387. Henan's provincial government had provided incentives for the airline to move its hub from Xi'an, Shaanxi to Zhengzhou, Henan's capital and largest city.

== Fleet ==
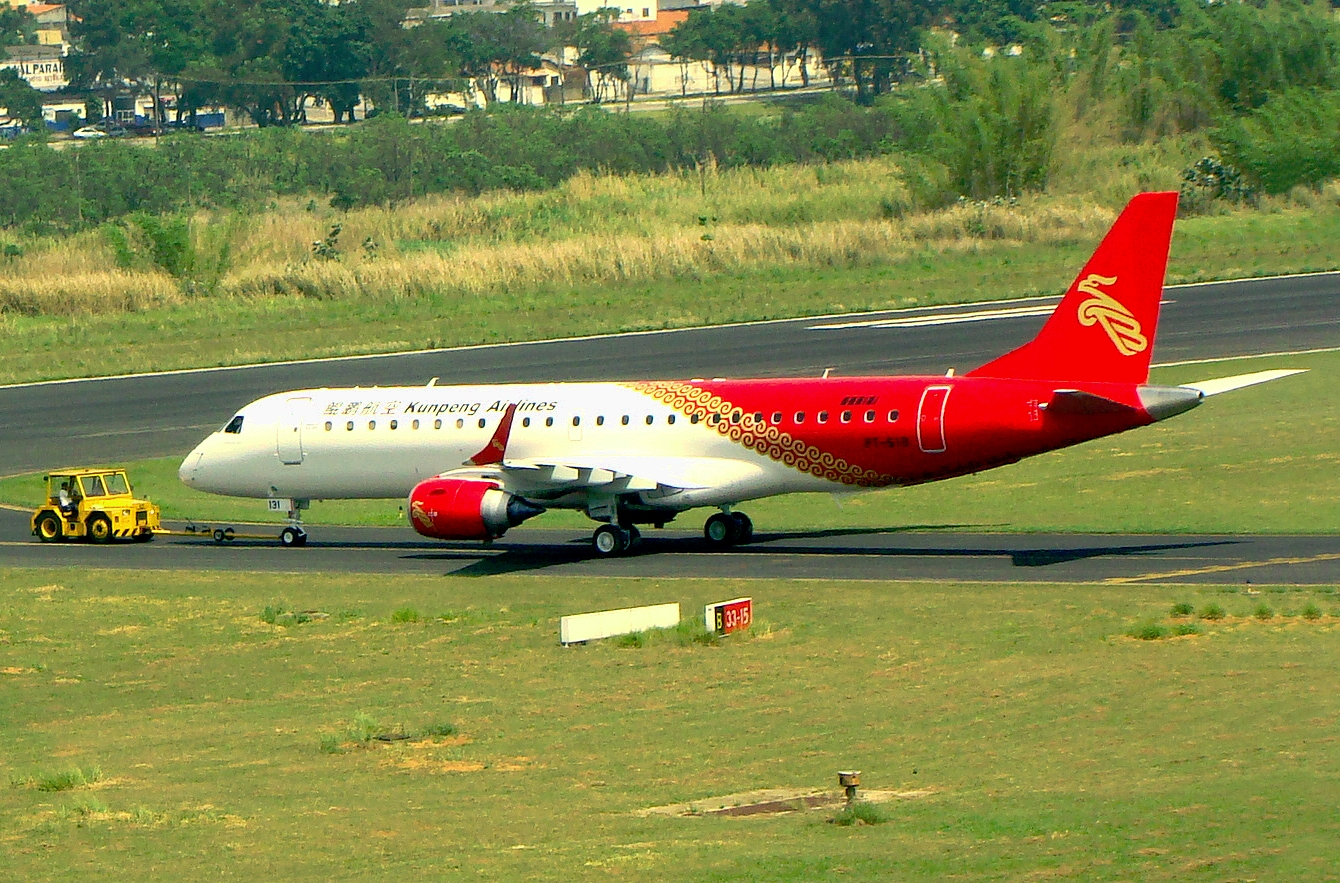
Henan Airlines

When the airline ceased the flight operations in August 2013, the Henan Airlines fleet consisted of the following aircraft:

Kunpeng Fleet
Aircraft	In Fleet	Orders	Passengers			Notes
Aircraft	In Fleet	Orders	J	Y	Total	Notes
Comac ARJ21-700	—	100	TBA			Largest order for the type, later cancelled
Embraer 190	4	—	6	92	98	
Total	4	100				

== Incidents and accidents ==
On August 24, 2010, Henan Airlines Flight 8387 crashed shortly before landing at Yichun Lindu Airport. There were 44 fatalities among the 96 passengers and crew on board.
