= Henan Airlines Flight 8387 =

2010 aviation accident in Yichun, China

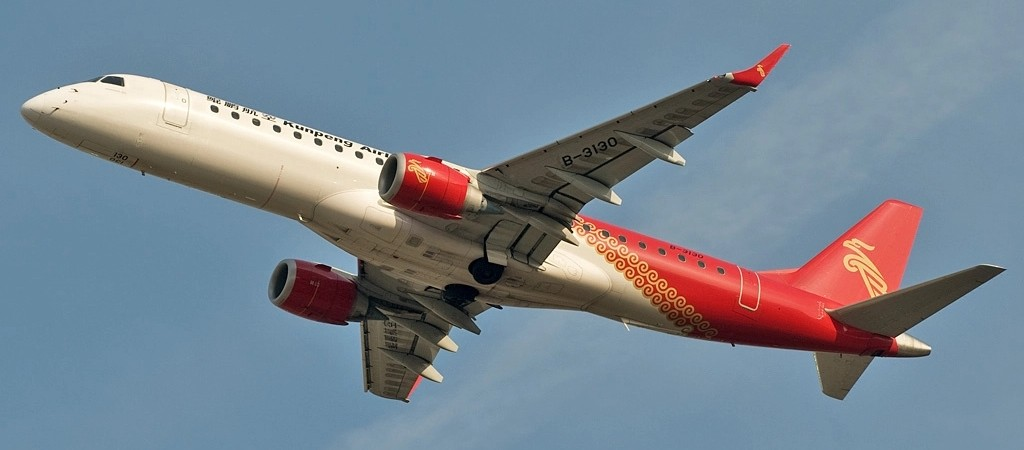
- B-3130, the aircraft involved in the accident, seen in 2009 with the previous brand name

Accident
- Date: 24 August 2010
- Summary: Controlled flight into terrain due to pilot error, poor weather
- Site: Near Lindu Airport, Yichun, Heilongjiang, China; 47°44′52″N 129°02′34″E

Aircraft
- Aircraft type: Embraer E190 LR
- Operator: Henan Airlines
- IATA flight No.: VD8387
- ICAO flight No.: KPA8387
- Call sign: Kun Peng 8387
- Registration: B-3130
- Flight origin: Harbin Taiping International Airport, Harbin, China
- Destination: Lindu Airport, Yichun, China
- Occupants: 96
- Passengers: 91
- Crew: 5
- Fatalities: 44
- Injuries: 52
- Survivors: 52

Henan Airlines Flight 8387 was a domestic flight operated by Henan Airlines from Harbin to Yichun, Heilongjiang. On the night of 24 August 2010, the Embraer E190 operating the route crashed on approach to Yichun Lindu Airport in fog. 44 of the 96 people on board were killed. This was the first hull loss and the first fatal accident involving the Embraer E190 and as of 2026, the deadliest.

The final investigation report, released in June 2012, concluded that the flight crew failed to observe safety procedures for operations in low visibility.

== Airport and weather ==
Yichun Lindu Airport, in the Heilongjiang Province, has a runway 2.3 km (1.4 mi) long, 45 m (148 ft) wide, qualified to operate with single-aisle airliners like Airbus A320 and Boeing 737. The airport started operations on 26 August 2009, one year before the accident. On the day of the accident the airport had two flight controllers, both in good health and qualified. The final report also confirmed that all safety procedures had been performed correctly, that the airfield navigation and communications equipment was working correctly and that the runway was serviceable.

The airport is located in a valley, with about 90% relative humidity, especially in the afternoon, from 17:00 until 21:00. The rapid temperature drop with little wind provide the conditions for a fog formation known as radiation fog, characterised by a thick and low fog that significantly impacts operations. In September 2009, one month after the start of operations at Yichun airport, China Southern Airlines decided not to operate at night at that airport due to concerns with the safety of operations.

On the night of the accident, the airport's meteorological observatory issued bulletins stating the visibility conditions. At 19:00, the visibility was 1.0 km (0.62 mi), by 21:00 it was 8.0 km (5.0 mi). At 21:08 the airport issued a special bulletin reporting that visibility was reduced to 2.8 km (1.7 mi) and decreasing rapidly.

== Accident ==
Flight 8387 departed Harbin Airport at 20:51; at 21:10 the aircraft obtained the weather report from Yichun Airport and they were told the visibility was 2,800 m (9,200 ft). At 21:16 the crew were alerted to dense fog at the airport and within the next ten minutes they confirmed a decision height of 440 m (1,440 ft) for a VOR/DME approach to Runway 30. At 21:28:19 the airport controller told the Flight 8387 that although the vertical visibility was okay, the horizontal visibility was low. At 21:28:38 the aircraft overflew the airport and was seen by the airport controller. At 21:33 they completed a procedural turn for the approach; at 21:36 the autopilot was disengaged. At 21:37 the aircraft had descended to the 440 m (1,440 ft) decision height but the pilot could not see the runway. At 21:38 the aural height warning started; although the crew could not see the runway and had passed the decision height they did not execute a missed approach, and the aircraft hit the ground.

According to Yichun officials' preliminary observations, the aircraft broke apart while it was in the process of landing at around 21:36 local time (13:36 UTC), while the airport was enclosed with fog. The aircraft touched down around 1.5 km (0.9 mi; 0.8 nmi) short of the runway, then caught fire. The wreckage of the fuselage came to a rest 700 m (2,300 ft) from the runway. Some passengers escaped through gaps in the fuselage.

Details surrounding the crash were unclear in the immediate aftermath; a local official reported that the aircraft broke in two as it was landing and that passengers were thrown from the aircraft, though some survivors said that it remained intact until it came to rest short of the runway.

Subsequent investigations concluded that the first impact was with trees, 1,100 m (3,600 ft) from the runway threshold, at 21:38:08. Thereafter, the aircraft hit the ground with its main landing gear, 1,080 m (3,540 ft) from the landing runway threshold, running on the ground a distance of 870 m (2,850 ft), until the engines hit the ground. This impact ruptured the wing fuel tanks, spilling fuel and causing the fire. The survivors left the aircraft by the door behind the cockpit and through openings in the fuselage. Emergency exits could not be opened, and a large amount of smoke accumulated in the cabin. The pilot, who survived the accident, could not organize nor conduct the passengers' evacuation.

== Aircraft and crew ==
The aircraft involved was an Embraer E190 LR, a twin-engined jet airliner registered in China as B-3130. It was built in Brazil in 2008, with the manufacturer's serial number 19000223, and delivered to the airline in December 2008. At the time of the accident, the aircraft had flown 5,109 hours and completed 4,712 flight cycles.

The captain was 40-year-old Qi Quanjun and the first officer was 27-year-old Zhu Jianzhou. The final report did not state the flight crew's experience.

== Casualties ==
The aircraft was in a two-class configuration with six business seats and 92 economy seats but at the time of accident had only 91 passengers. In addition to the passengers, the aircraft had a crew of five (two flight crew, a purser, flight attendant and security officer), for a total of 96 on board.

Initial reports suggested that 53 people survived the crash, while 43 were found dead at the scene; later reports corrected the death toll to 42 because the body of one victim was torn apart. Most of the dead were seated in the rear of the aircraft. Of the 54 survivors, 17 had only minor injuries but two were seriously burned and died in hospital.

Many passengers were participants of a national conference on human resources and employment, including vice minister Sun Baoshu and other officials of the Chinese Ministry of Human Resources and Social Security. Two participants from Chengdu were among the fatalities.

Captain Qi survived the accident, though he sustained heavy facial injuries.

=== Nationalities of fatalities and survivors ===
Nationality	Fatalities		Survivors		Total
Nationality	Passengers	Crew	Passengers	Crew	Total
China	39	4	51	1	95
Taiwan	1	0	0	0	1
Total	40	4	51	1	96

== Aftermath ==
Crews immediately began searching for survivors, although the efforts were hampered by the heavy fog. This phase of the rescue operation lasted for around eight hours before personnel at the scene began clearing the wreckage the morning after the accident.

Henan Airlines cancelled all flights in the days after the incident and fired the airline's general manager. Nationally, Chinese airlines performed increased safety checks in response to the crash.

The Administration for Industry and Commerce of Henan Province announced days after the incident that it had rescinded the enterprise name registration of Henan Airlines, and demanded that the airline operator restore its original name of Kunpeng Airlines. The administration cited as reasons for its decision that the name Henan Airlines had caused public misunderstanding and greatly damaged the image of the province, which holds no stake in the airline operator. This move was immediately met with media criticism, which questioned the validity of the administration's interference with Henan Airlines' rights to choice of name. It was also revealed that the province had offered favorable conditions to attract the airline operator to adopt its current name, and celebrated the renaming afterwards.

On August 31, Henan Airlines announced that it would pay 960,000 yuan (around $140,000 USD) to the relatives of each person killed in the crash. The payment was required under PRC civil aviation law.

Flight 8387 was the last fatal air accident in China until the crash of China Eastern Airlines Flight 5735 which crashed nearly 12 years later, killing all 132 passengers and crew.

== Investigation ==
Both the Civil Aviation Administration of China (CAAC) and the aircraft's manufacturer, Embraer, sent teams of investigators to the crash site. The U.S. National Transportation Safety Board appointed an accredited representative, as the aircraft's General Electric CF34 engines were made in the U.S. The flight recorders were recovered at the scene and sent to Beijing for analysis.

Early in the investigation, the focus of the investigation were the qualifications of the pilot, as it emerged that upwards of a hundred pilots flying for Shenzhen Airlines, Henan Airlines' parent company, had falsified their claims of flying experience.

Investigators from the State Administration of Work Safety concluded that the captain, on his first flight into Yichun, switched off the autopilot and approached the runway covered by radiation fog despite the fact that a visibility of 2,800 m (9,200 ft) was below the minimum of 3,600 m (11,800 ft). In addition, the crew descended below minimum descent altitude although visual contact with the runway had not been established.

The crew also failed to initiate a missed approach when the radio altimeter callouts indicated that the airplane was near the ground and the communication and cooperation within the crew was insufficient, despite the known safety risks at that airport.

On December 25, 2014, captain Qi was sentenced to three years in prison for his role in the accident. However Qi appealed the decision the next day; his lawyer stated that the sentence was "too harsh" and that Qi "was not the only person responsible for the crash."
