= Shenzhen Airlines =

Airline of China

Shenzhen Airlines 深圳航空

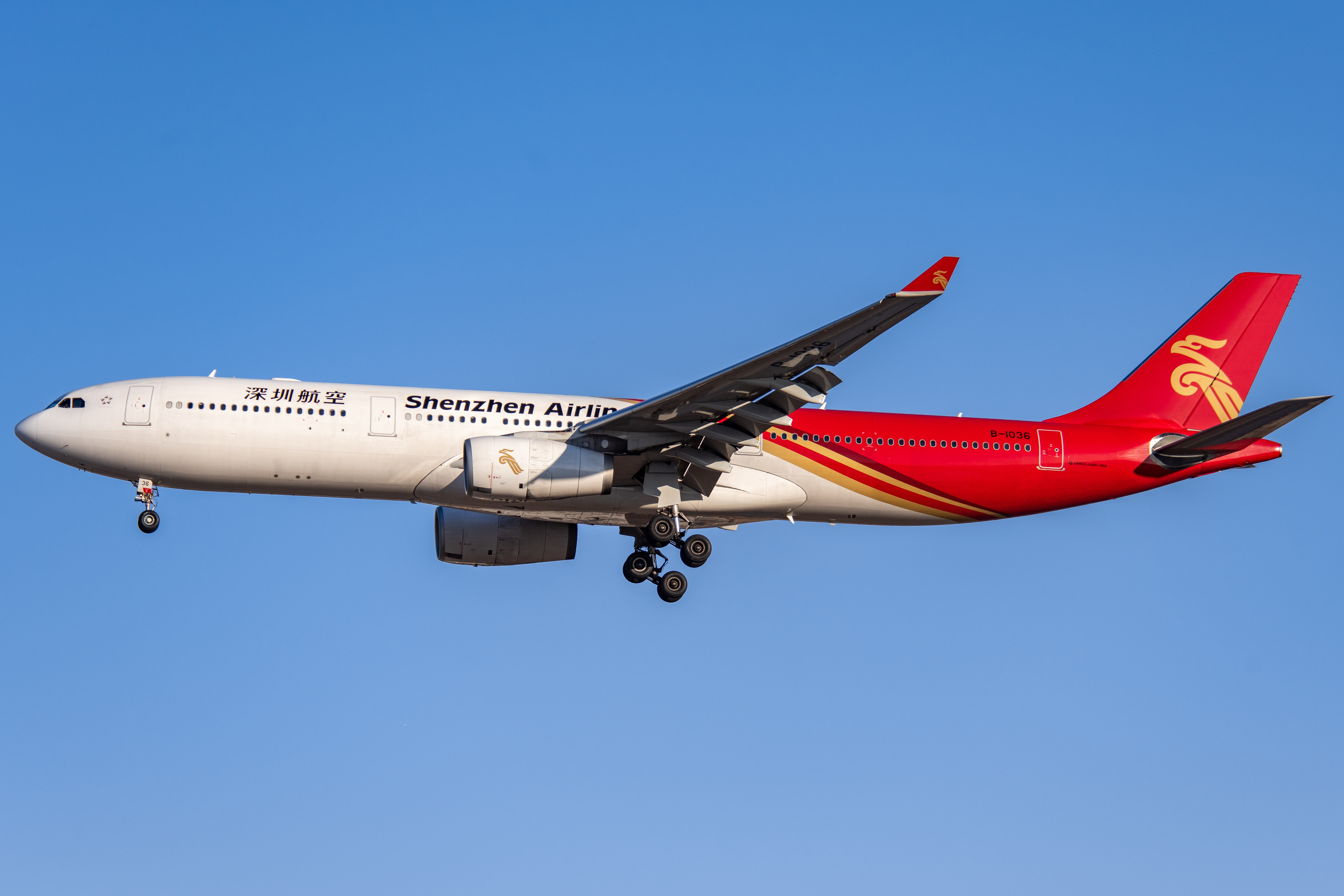
- Shenzhen Airlines Airbus A330-300
IATA	ICAO	Call sign
ZH	CSZ	SHENZHEN AIR
- Founded: November 1992; 33 years ago
- Commenced operations: 17 September 1993; 33 years ago
- Hubs: Shenzhen
- Focus cities: Beijing-Capital; Guangzhou; Nanning; Shenyang; Wuxi; Zhengzhou
- Frequent-flyer program: PhoenixMiles
- Alliance: Star Alliance
- Subsidiaries: Kunming Airlines (80%)
- Fleet size: 202
- Destinations: 92
- Parent company: Air China (51%); Shenzhen International Holdings (28.1%); Kunhang Investment (20.9%)
- Headquarters: Shenzhen Bao'an International Airport; Bao'an, Shenzhen, Guangdong
- Key people: Jie Wang (CEO)
- Website: global.shenzhenair.com

Shenzhen Airlines Co., Ltd
- Simplified Chinese: 深圳航空责任公司
- Traditional Chinese: 深圳航空責任公司
Transcriptions
Standard Mandarin
- Hanyu Pinyin: Shēnzhèn Hángkōng Zérèn Gōngsī
Yue: Cantonese
- Jyutping: sam^{1}zan^{3} hong^{4}hung^{1}zaak^{3}jam^{6} gung^{1}si^{1}

Abbreviation
- Chinese: 深航
Transcriptions
Standard Mandarin
- Hanyu Pinyin: Shēn Háng
Yue: Cantonese
- Jyutping: sam^{1} hong^{4}

Shenzhen Airlines is an airline headquartered in Bao'an, Shenzhen, Guangdong, China. It is based in Shenzhen Bao'an International Airport.

It has been a member of Star Alliance since 2012, and is currently one of two Chinese airlines that are members. In 2010, the airline carried 16.5 million passengers, up 9% from the previous year. The airline had its headquarters in the Lintian Building at Shenzhen Airport.

== Destinations ==
As of June 2026, Shenzhen Airlines flies (or has flown) to the following destinations:

Country (province)	City	Airport	Notes	Refs
Australia	Melbourne	Melbourne Airport		
Australia	Sydney	Sydney Airport	Begins 14 December, 2026	
Cambodia	Phnom Penh	Phnom Penh International Airport	Airport closed	
Cambodia	Phnom Penh	Techo International Airport		
China (Anhui)	Chizhou	Chizhou Jiuhuashan Airport		
China (Anhui)	Hefei	Hefei Xinqiao International Airport		
China (Beijing)	Beijing	Beijing Capital International Airport	Focus city	
China (Chongqing)	Chongqing	Chongqing Jiangbei International Airport		
China (Chongqing)	Wanzhou	Wanzhou Wuqiao Airport	Terminated	
China (Fujian)	Fuzhou	Fuzhou Changle International Airport		
China (Fujian)	Longyan	Liancheng Guanzhishan Airport	Terminated	
China (Fujian)	Quanzhou	Quanzhou Jinjiang International Airport		
China (Fujian)	Xiamen	Xiamen Gaoqi International Airport		
China (Gansu)	Lanzhou	Lanzhou Zhongchuan International Airport		
China (Guangdong)	Guangzhou	Guangzhou Baiyun International Airport	Focus city	
China (Guangdong)	Shantou	Jieyang Chaoshan International Airport	Terminated	
China (Guangdong)	Shenzhen	Shenzhen Bao'an International Airport	Hub	
China (Guangdong)	Zhanjiang	Zhanjiang Airport	Airport closed	
China (Guangdong)	Zhanjiang	Zhanjiang Wuchuan International Airport		
China (Guangdong)	Zhuhai	Zhuhai Jinwan Airport		
China (Guangxi)	Guilin	Guilin Liangjiang International Airport	Terminated	
China (Guangxi)	Nanning	Nanning Wuxu International Airport	Focus city	
China (Guizhou)	Guiyang	Guiyang Longdongbao International Airport		
China (Hainan)	Haikou	Haikou Meilan International Airport		
China (Hainan)	Sanya	Sanya Phoenix International Airport		
China (Hebei)	Shijiazhuang	Shijiazhuang Zhengding International Airport		
China (Heilongjiang)	Harbin	Harbin Taiping International Airport		
China (Heilongjiang)	Yichun	Yichun Lindu Airport	Terminated	
China (Henan)	Zhengzhou	Zhengzhou Xinzheng International Airport	Focus city	
China (Hubei)	Wuhan	Wuhan Tianhe International Airport		
China (Hubei)	Xiangyang	Xiangyang Liuji Airport		
China (Hubei)	Yichang	Yichang Sanxia International Airport		
China (Hunan)	Changsha	Changsha Huanghua International Airport		
China (Inner Mongolia)	Baotou	Baotou Donghe International Airport	Terminated	
China (Inner Mongolia)	Hohhot	Hohhot Baita International Airport		
China (Inner Mongolia)	Hulunbuir	Hulunbuir Hailar International Airport	Terminated	
China (Inner Mongolia)	Manzhouli	Manzhouli Xijiao International Airport	Terminated	
China (Jiangsu)	Changzhou	Changzhou Benniu International Airport		
China (Jiangsu)	Nanjing	Nanjing Lukou International Airport		
China (Jiangsu)	Nantong	Nantong Xingdong International Airport		
China (Jiangsu)	Wuxi	Wuxi Shuofang Airport	Focus city	
China (Jiangsu)	Yangzhou	Yangzhou Taizhou International Airport		
China (Jiangxi)	Jingdezhen	Jingdezhen Luojia Airport		
China (Jiangxi)	Nanchang	Nanchang Changbei International Airport		
China (Jilin)	Changchun	Changchun Longjia International Airport		
China (Liaoning)	Dalian	Dalian Zhoushuizi International Airport		
China (Liaoning)	Shenyang	Shenyang Taoxian International Airport	Focus city	
China (Ningxia)	Yinchuan	Yinchuan Hedong International Airport		
China (Qinghai)	Xining	Xining Caojiapu International Airport		
China (Shandong)	Jinan	Jinan Yaoqiang International Airport		
China (Shandong)	Linyi	Linyi Qiyang International Airport		
China (Shandong)	Qingdao	Qingdao Jiaodong International Airport		
China (Shandong)	Qingdao	Qingdao Liuting International Airport	Airport closed	
China (Shaanxi)	Xi'an	Xi'an Xianyang International Airport		
China (Shanghai)	Shanghai	Shanghai Hongqiao International Airport		
China (Shanghai)	Shanghai	Shanghai Pudong International Airport		
China (Shanxi)	Taiyuan	Taiyuan Wusu International Airport		
China (Shanxi)	Yuncheng	Yuncheng Yanhu International Airport		
China (Sichuan)	Chengdu	Chengdu Shuangliu International Airport		
China (Sichuan)	Chengdu	Chengdu Tianfu International Airport		
China (Sichuan)	Guangyuan	Guangyuan Panlong Airport	Terminated	
China (Sichuan)	Mianyang	Mianyang Nanjiao Airport		
China (Sichuan)	Yibin	Yibin Wuliangye Airport		
China (Tianjin)	Tianjin	Tianjin Binhai International Airport		
China (Xinjiang)	Karamay	Karamay Guhai Airport	Terminated	
China (Xinjiang)	Ürümqi	Ürümqi Tianshan International Airport		
China (Yunnan)	Kunming	Kunming Changshui International Airport		
China (Yunnan)	Kunming	Kunming Wujiaba International Airport	Airport closed	
China (Yunnan)	Lijiang	Lijiang Sanyi International Airport		
China (Yunnan)	Tengchong	Tengchong Tuofeng Airport	Terminated	
China (Zhejiang)	Hangzhou	Hangzhou Xiaoshan International Airport		
China (Zhejiang)	Quzhou	Quzhou Airport	Terminated	
China (Zhejiang)	Taizhou	Taizhou Luqiao Airport		
China (Zhejiang)	Wenzhou	Wenzhou Longwan International Airport		
China (Zhejiang)	Zhoushan	Zhoushan Putuoshan International Airport		
Hong Kong	Hong Kong	Hong Kong International Airport		
Indonesia	Jakarta	Soekarno–Hatta International Airport	Terminated	
Japan	Nagoya	Chubu Centrair International Airport	Terminated	
Japan	Osaka	Kansai International Airport		
Japan	Tokyo	Narita International Airport		
Malaysia	Kota Kinabalu	Kota Kinabalu International Airport	Terminated	
Malaysia	Kuala Lumpur	Kuala Lumpur International Airport		
Malaysia	Kuching	Kuching International Airport	Terminated	
Malaysia	Penang	Penang International Airport		
Philippines	Manila	Ninoy Aquino International Airport		
Qatar	Doha	Hamad International Airport		
Singapore	Singapore	Changi Airport		
South Korea	Jeju	Jeju International Airport		
South Korea	Seoul	Incheon International Airport		
Spain	Barcelona	Josep Tarradellas Barcelona–El Prat Airport		
Taiwan	Taipei	Taoyuan International Airport		
Thailand	Bangkok	Suvarnabhumi Airport		
Thailand	Phuket	Phuket International Airport		
United Kingdom	London	Heathrow Airport		
Vietnam	Hanoi	Noi Bai International Airport		
Vietnam	Ho Chi Minh City	Tan Son Nhat International Airport		

=== Joint Venture agreements ===
Shenzhen Airlines has joint venture agreements with the following airlines:

- Air China
- Austrian Airlines
- Lufthansa
- Swiss International Air Lines

=== Codeshare agreements ===
Shenzhen Airlines has codeshare agreements with the following airlines:

- Air Macau
- All Nippon Airways
- Asiana Airlines
- Cathay Pacific
- Ethiopian Airlines
- EVA Air
- Kunming Airlines (subsidiary)
- Shandong Airlines
- Sichuan Airlines
- Singapore Airlines
- Thai Airways International
- Uni Air
- Xizang Airlines

== Fleet ==
=== Current fleet ===
As of June 2026, Shenzhen Airlines operates the following aircraft:

Shenzhen Airlines fleet
Aircraft	In service	Orders	Passengers				Notes
Aircraft	In service	Orders	J	W	Y	Total	Notes
Airbus A320-200	76	—	8	—	144	152	Older aircraft are to be replaced by Airbus A320neo family aircraft.
Airbus A320neo	30	45	8	—	144	152	Replacing older Airbus A320ceo aircraft.
Airbus A321neo	6	24	12	18	154	184	Replacing older Airbus A320ceo aircraft.
Airbus A330-300	6	—	18	24	267	309	
Airbus A350-900	1	4	32	24	256	312	To be transferred from Air China. Has two different Business Class seats.
Boeing 737-800	71	—	8	—	154	162	Older aircraft to be replaced by Boeing 737 MAX aircraft.
Boeing 737 MAX 8	15	7	8	—	154	162	Replacing older Boeing 737NG aircraft.
Total	205	35					

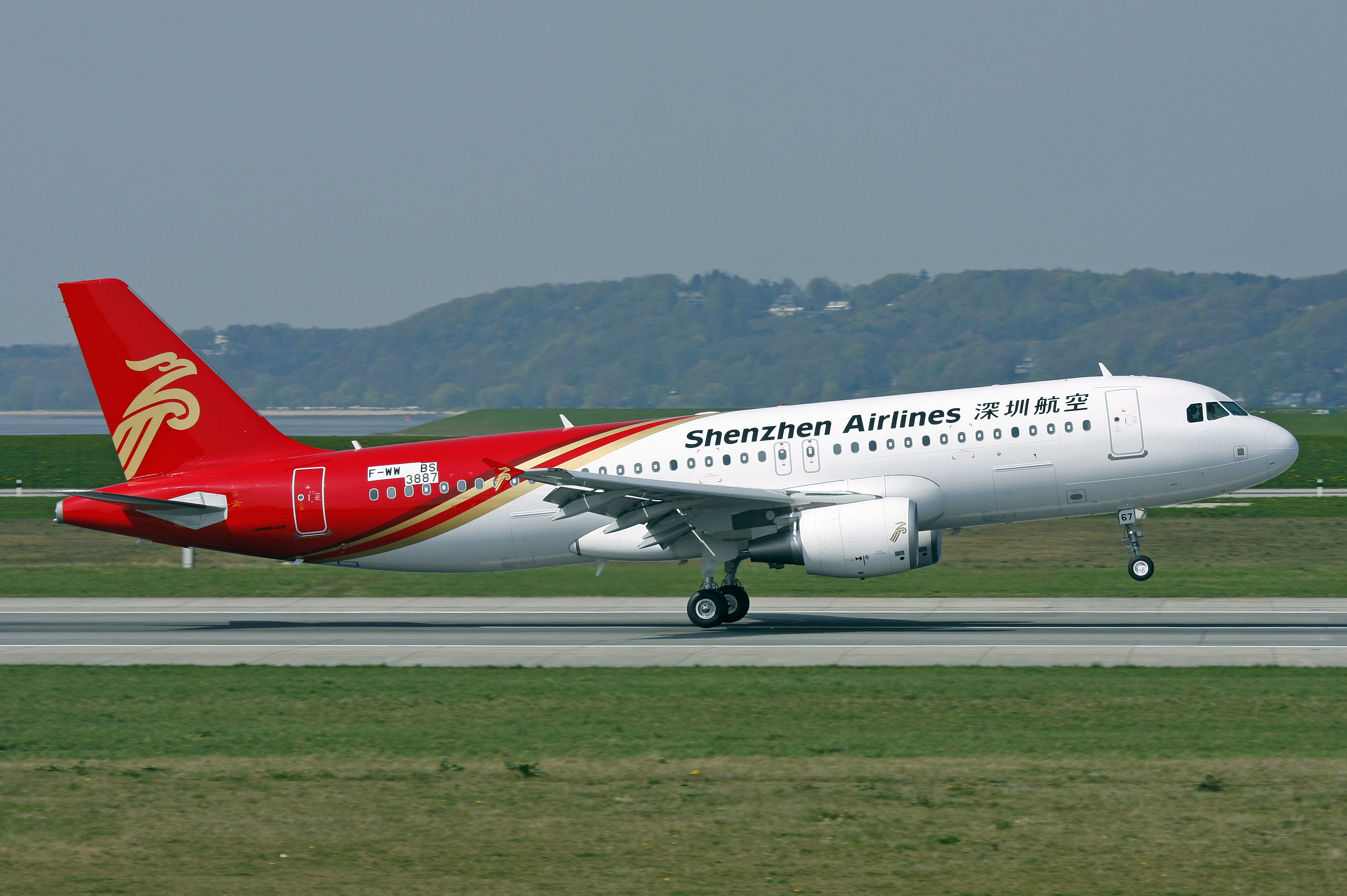
Shenzhen Airlines Airbus A320-200 in 2009

Shenzhen Airlines Airbus A320neo in 2024

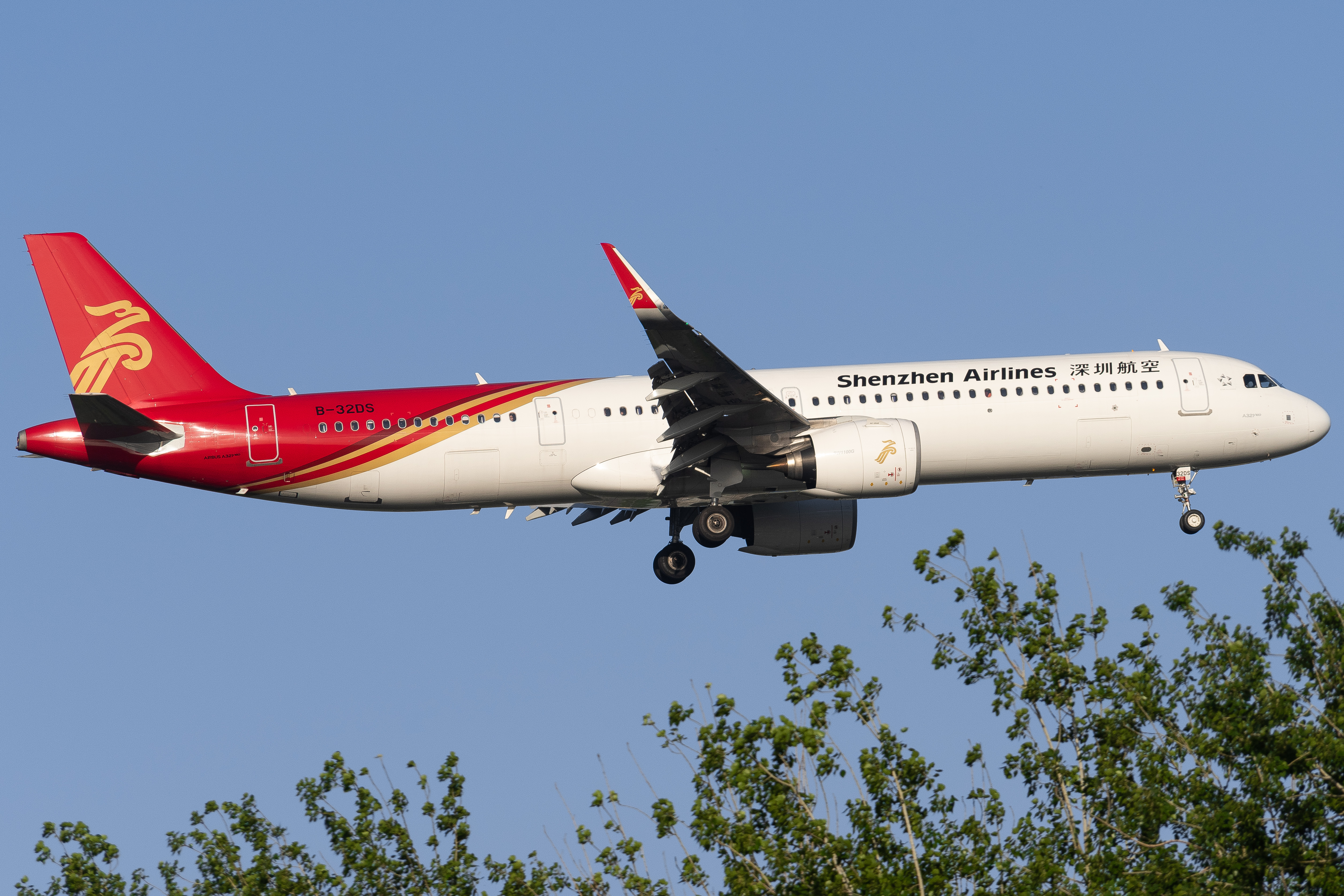
Shenzhen Airlines Airbus A321neo in 2024

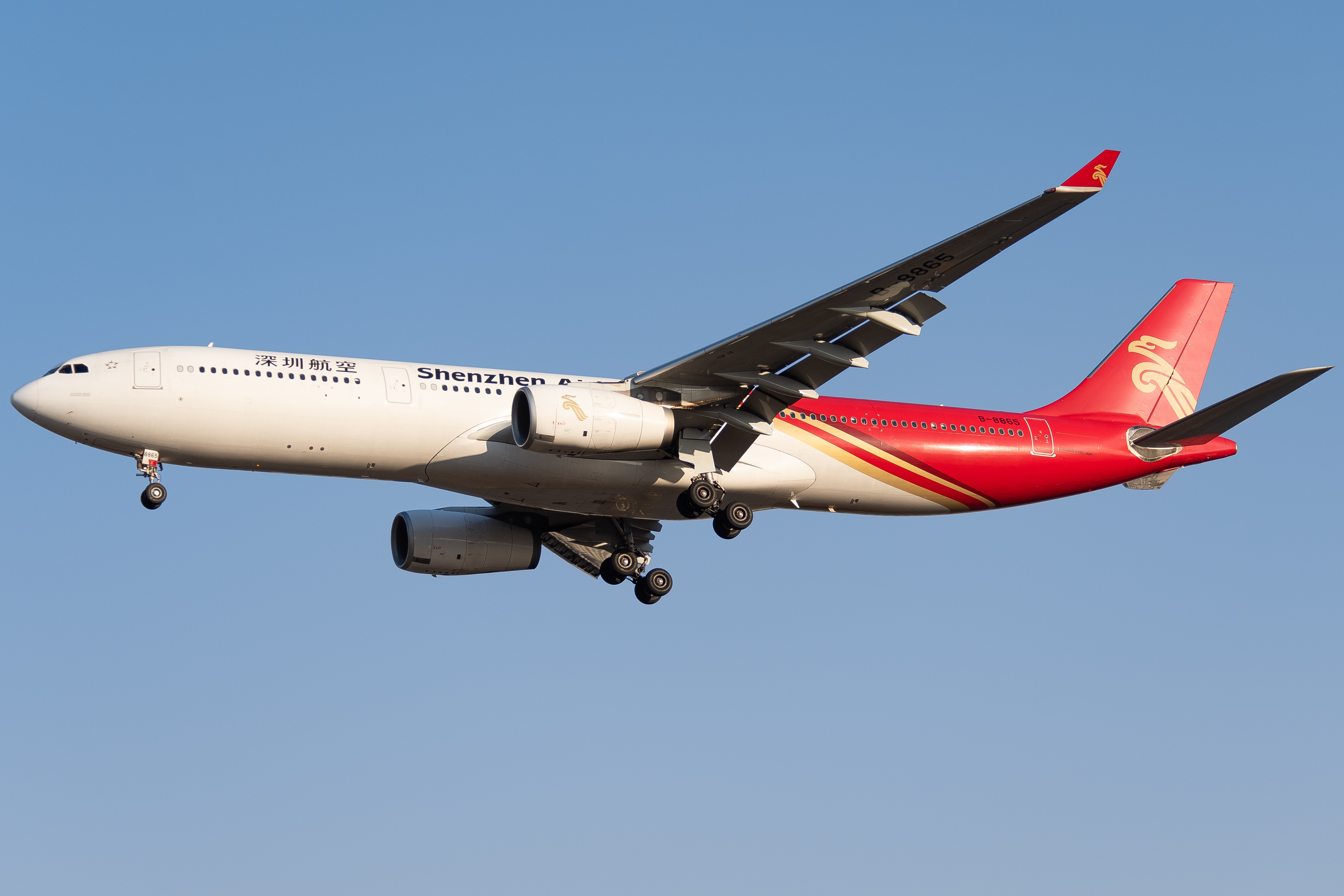
Shenzhen Airlines Airbus A330-300 in 2020

Shenzhen Airlines Airbus A350-900 in 2026

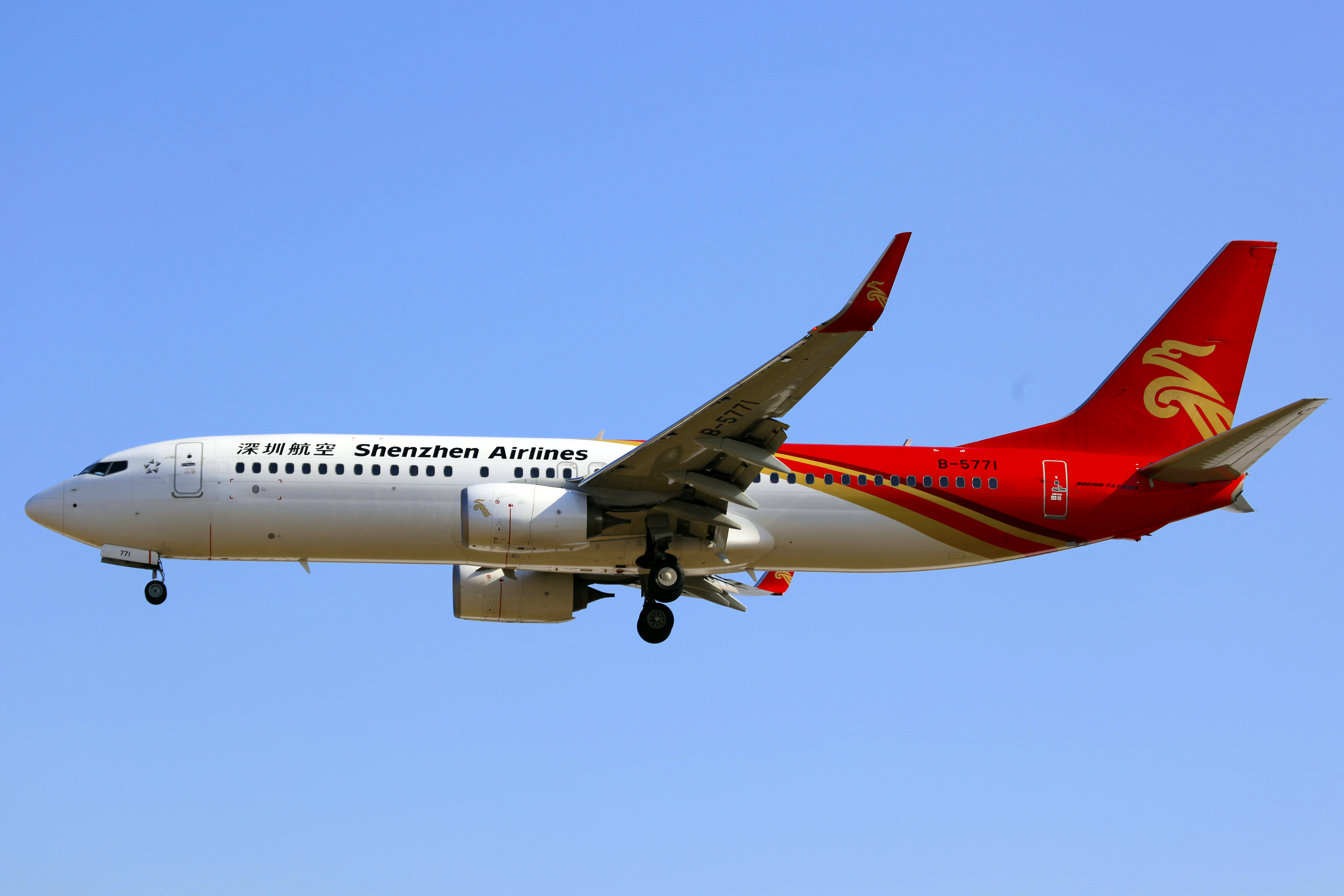
Shenzhen Airlines Boeing 737-800 in 2014

Shenzhen Airlines Boeing 737 MAX 8 in 2024

In July 2026, it is disclosed that Shenzhen Airlines to purchase 40 A320neo-family aircraft, the aircraft will be delivered between 2029 and 2032.

=== Retired fleet ===
The airline previously operated the following aircraft:

Shenzhen Airlines retired fleet
Aircraft	Total	Introduced	Retired	Notes
Airbus A319-100	10	2006	2025	
Boeing 737-300	10	1993	2012	
Boeing 737-700	10	1998	2018	
Boeing 737-900	5	2005	2022	Included B-5105, the last 737-900 ever built.

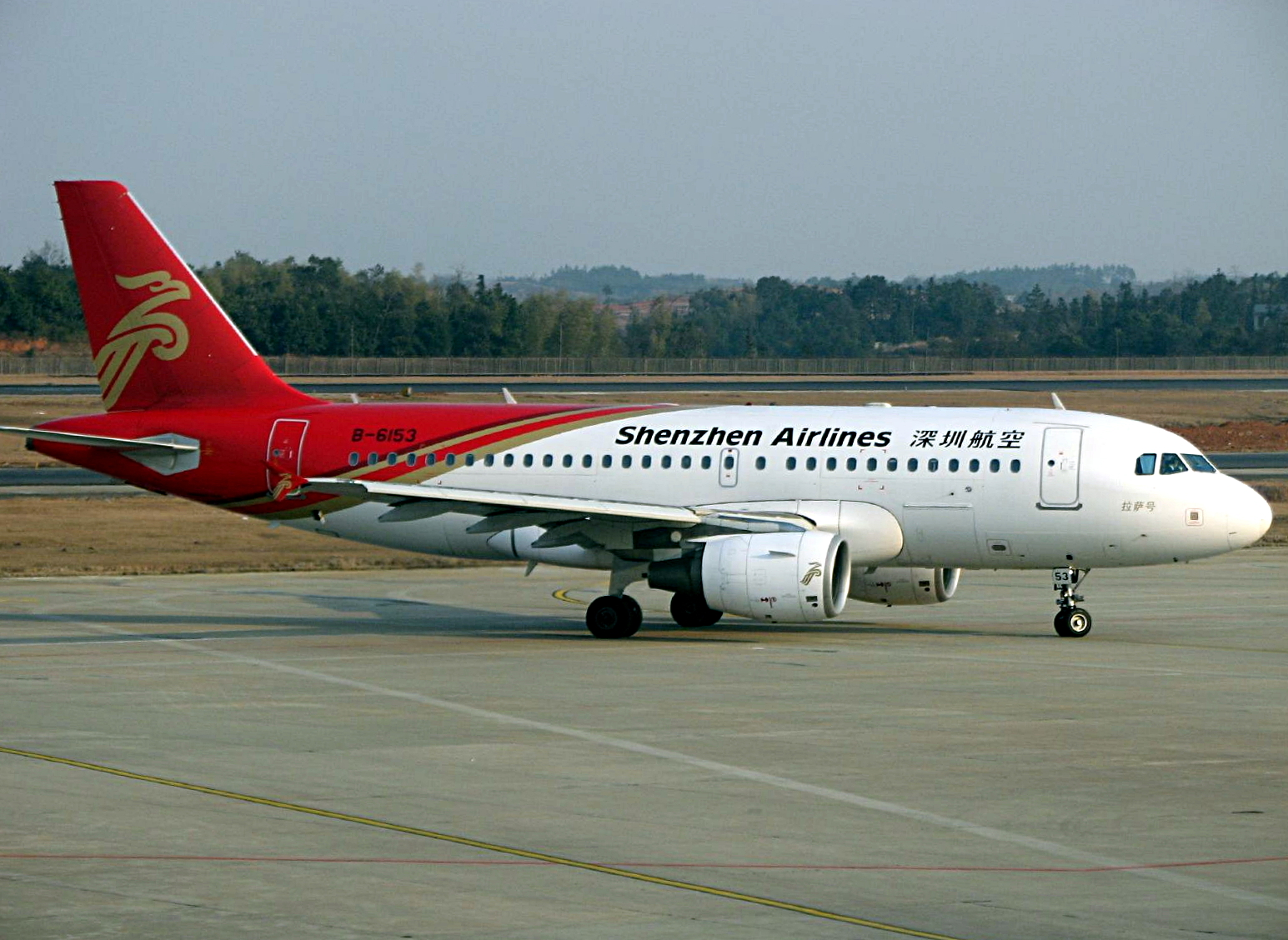
Shenzhen Airlines Airbus A319-100 in 2008

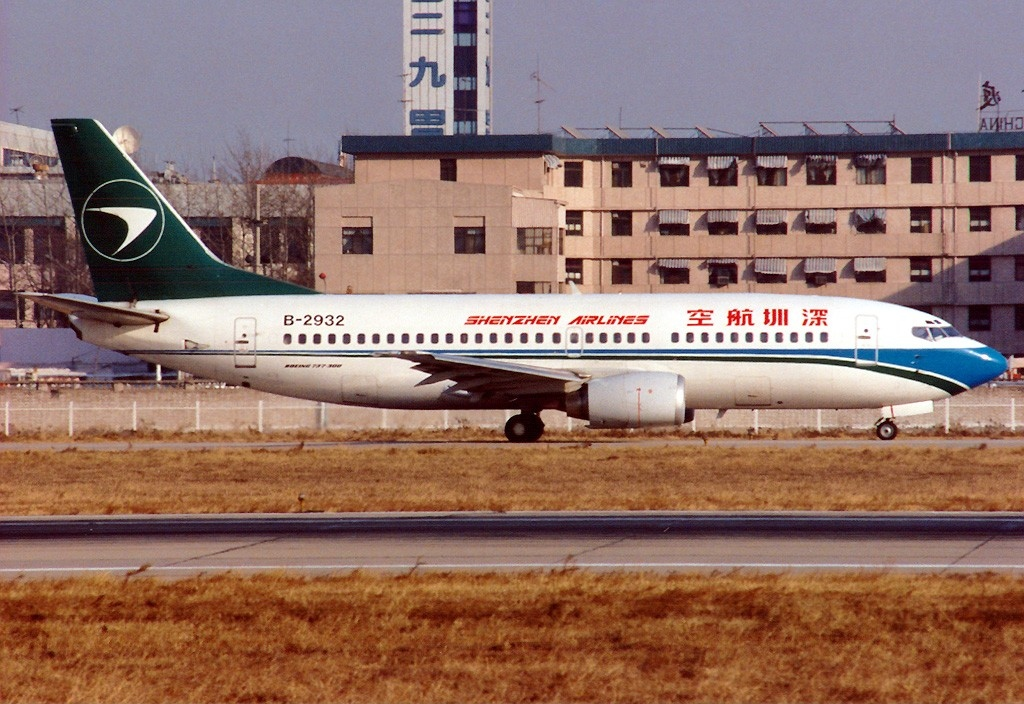
Shenzhen Airlines Boeing 737-300 in 1995

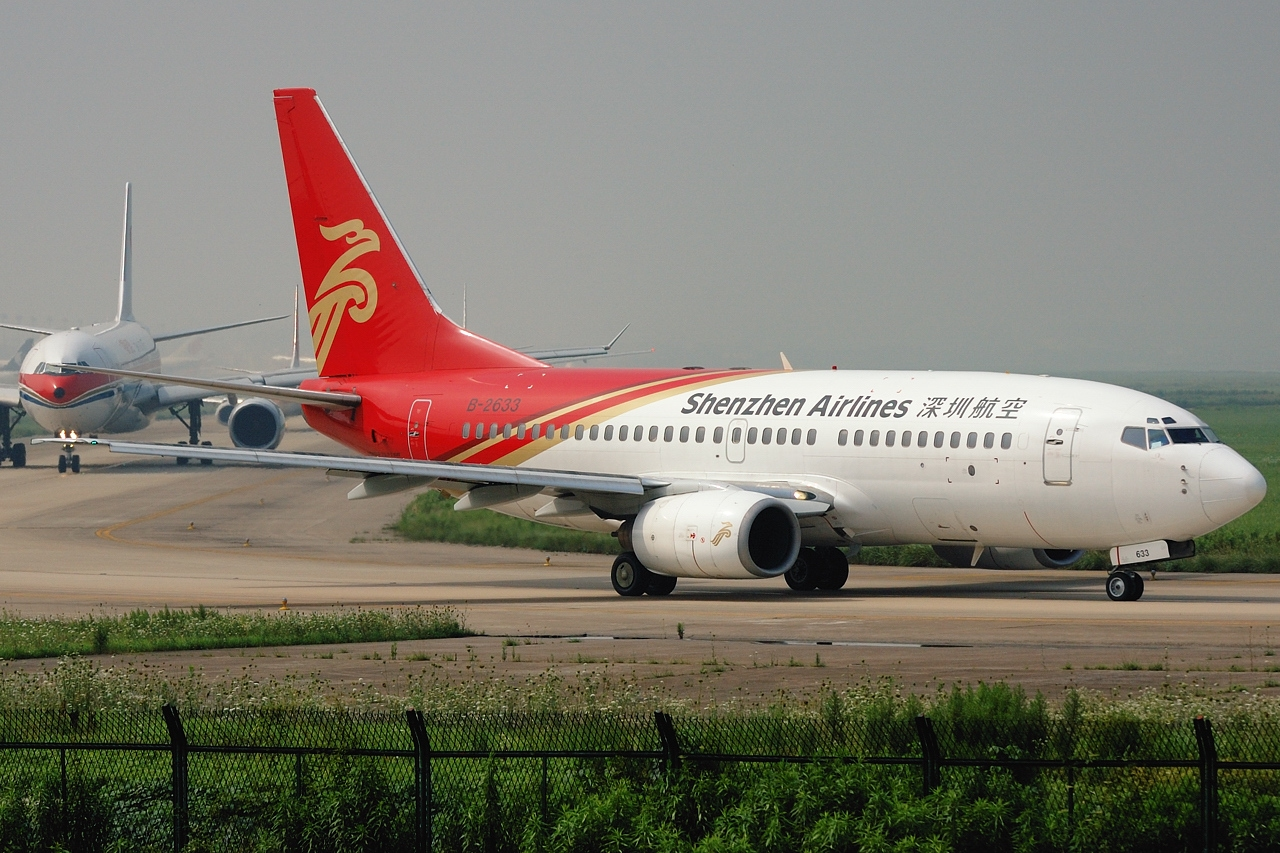
Shenzhen Airlines Boeing 737-700 in 2008

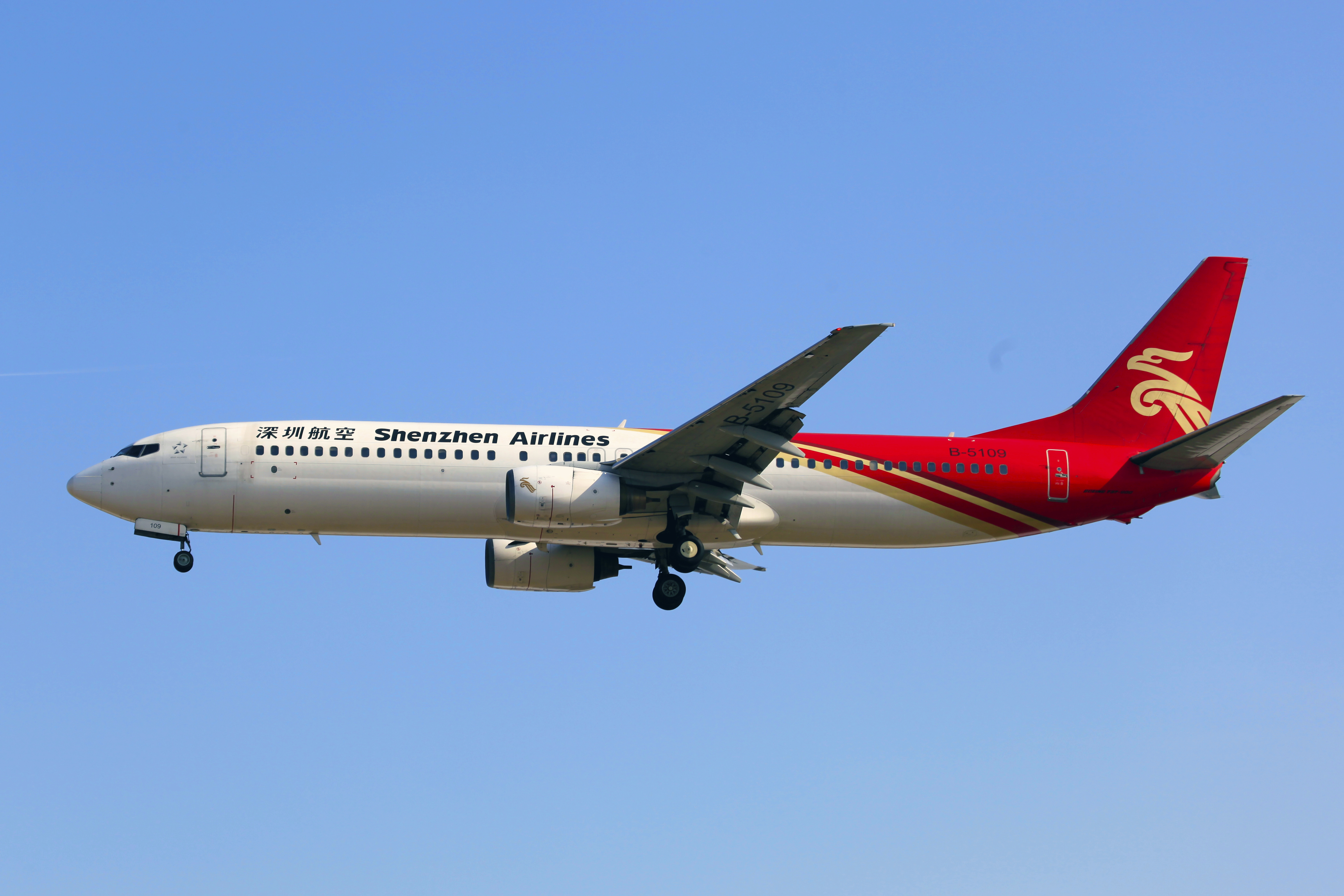
Shenzhen Airlines Boeing 737-900 in 2014

== See also ==
- Air China
- Henan Airlines
- Jade Cargo International (historical)
