= Embraer E-Jet family =

Regional jet airliner family

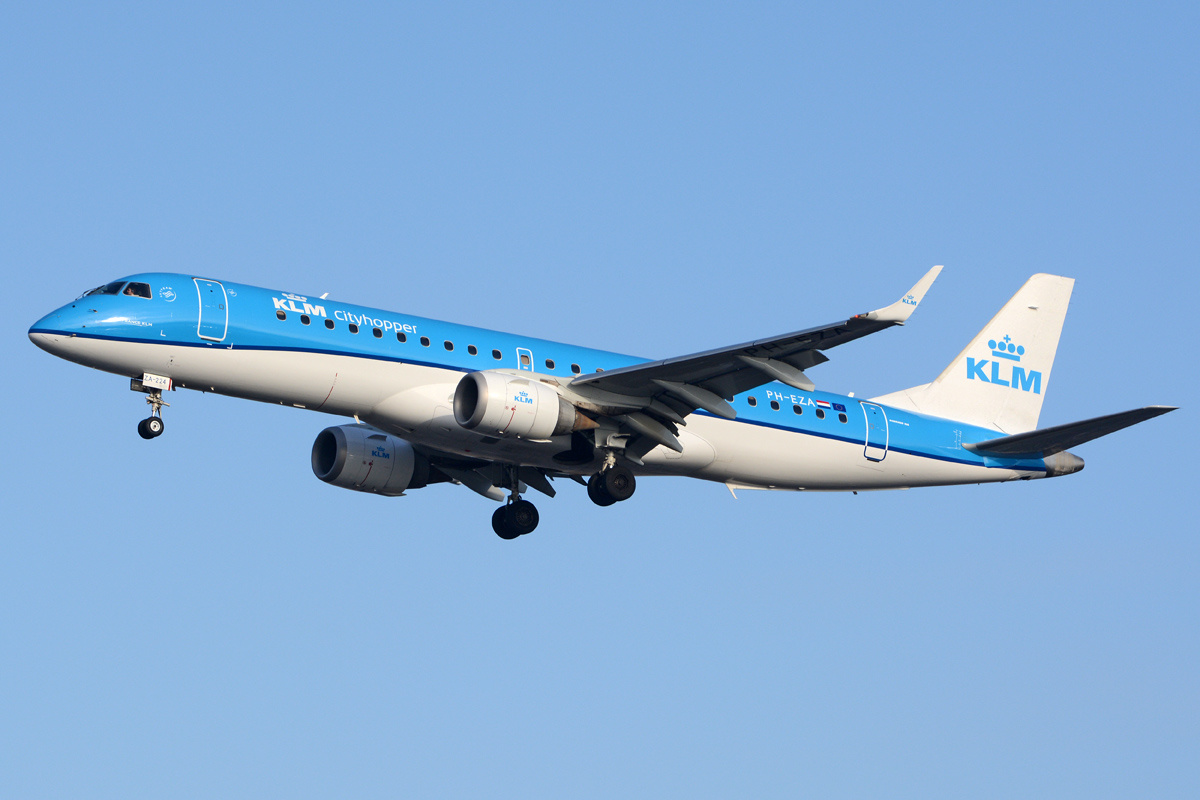
- Embraer 190 operated by KLM Cityhopper

General information
- Type: Regional jet Narrow-body airliner
- National origin: Brazil
- Manufacturer: Embraer
- Status: In service, E175 in production
- Primary users: SkyWest Airlines Republic Airways; Envoy Air; Mesa Airlines; British Airways
- Number built: 1,771 (Q3 2026)

History
- Manufactured: 2001–present
- Introduction date: 17 March 2004, with LOT Polish Airlines
- First flight: 19 February 2002
- Variant: Embraer Lineage 1000
- Developed into: Embraer E-Jet E2 family

The Embraer E-Jet family is a series of four-abreast, narrow-body, short- to medium-range, twin-engined regional jet airliners designed and produced by Brazilian aerospace manufacturer Embraer.

The E-Jet was designed to complement Embraer's earlier ERJ family, the company's first jet-powered regional aircraft. With a capacity of 66 to 124 passengers, the E-Jets were significantly larger than any aircraft Embraer had developed before that time. The project was unveiled in early 1997 and formally introduced at the 1999 Paris Air Show. On 19 February 2002, the first E-Jet prototype completed its maiden flight, and production began later that year.

The first E170 was delivered to LOT Polish Airlines on 17 March 2004. Initial rollout issues were quickly overcome, and Embraer rapidly expanded product support for better global coverage. Larger variants, the E190 and E195, entered service later in 2004, while a stretched version of the E170, the E175, was introduced in mid-2005.

The E-Jet series achieved commercial success, primarily due to their ability to serve lower-demand routes while offering many of the amenities and features of larger jets. The E-Jet family is used by both mainline and regional airlines worldwide, with particular popularity among regional airlines in the United States. It also served as the foundation for the Lineage 1000 business jet.

In the 2010s, Embraer introduced the second-generation E-Jet E2 family, featuring more fuel-efficient engines. However, as of 2026, the first-generation E175 remains in production to meet the needs of U.S. regional airlines, which are restricted from operating the newer generation due to scope clause limitations.

== Development ==
=== Background ===
During the 1990s, the Brazilian aerospace manufacturer Embraer had introduced the ERJ family, its first jet-powered regional jet. As demand for the ERJ series proved strong even early on, the company decided that it could not rely on one family of aircraft alone and examined its options for producing a complementary regional jet, including designs that would be larger and more advanced than its preceding aircraft.

During March 1997, Embraer made its first public disclosure that it was studying a new 70-seat aircraft, which was initially referred to as the EMB 170; this reveal was issued concurrently with the announcement of the development of the ERJ 135. As originally conceived, the EMB 170 was to feature a new wing and larger-diameter fuselage mated to the nose and cockpit of the ERJ 145. The proposed derivative would have cost $450 million to develop. While Alenia, Aerospatiale and British Aerospace through AI(R) were studying the Airjet 70 based on the ATR 42/72 fuselage for a 2,200 km (1,200 nmi; 1,400 mi) range, AI(R) and Embraer were studying a joint development of a 70-seater jet since their separate projects were not yet launched.

In February 1999, Embraer announced it had abandoned the derivative approach in favour of an all-new design. On 14 June 1999, the E-Jet family was formally launched at the Paris Air Show, initially using the twin designations ERJ-170 and ERJ-190; these were subsequently changed to Embraer 170 and Embraer 190 respectively. The launch customers for the airliner were the French airline Régional, which placed ten orders and five options for the E170, and the Swiss airline Crossair, which had ordered 30 E170s and 30 E190s.

During July 2000, production of components for the construction of both the prototype and test airframes began. Difficulties with the advanced avionics selected for the aircraft, supplied by the American company Honeywell, led to delays in the development schedule; originally, the first flight had been set to take place during 2000. On 29 October 2001, the first prototype PP-XJE was rolled out at São José dos Campos, Brazil.

=== Intro flight ===
On 19 February 2002, the first prototype performed its maiden flight, marking the beginning of a multi-year flight test campaign involving a total of six prototypes. In May 2002, the aircraft was displayed to the public at the Regional Airline Association convention. During that same year, full-rate production of the E-Jet commenced; this activity was centred around a recently completed factory built by Embraer at its São José dos Campos base.

After a positive response from the airline community, Embraer launched the E175, which stretched the fuselage of the E170 by 1.78 metres (5.8 ft). During June 2003, the first flight of the E175 took place. In April 2003, jetBlue placed an order for 100 Embraer 190s, the deliveries of which commenced two years later.

Following several delays in the certification process, the E170 received type certification from the civil aviation authorities of Brazil, Europe and the United States in February 2004.

=== Production ===
In 2008, the 400th E-jet was delivered to Republic Airways in the United States. In September 2009, the 600th E-jet was delivered to LOT Polish Airlines.

On 10 October 2012, Embraer delivered the 900th E-Jet to Kenya Airways, its 12th E-Jet. On 13 September 2013, the delivery of the 1,000th E-Jet, an E175 to Republic Airways for American Eagle, was marked by a ceremony held at the Embraer factory in São José dos Campos, with a special "1,000th E-Jet" decal above the cabin windows.

On 6 December 2017, the 1,400th E-Jet was delivered, an E175; it had a backlog of over 150 firm orders on 30 September 2017.

On 18 December 2018, Embraer delivered the 1,500th E-Jet, an E175 to Alaska Air subsidiary Horizon Air, as Embraer claims an 80% market share of the North American 76-seaters. By this point, the fleet had completed 25 million flight hours in 18 million cycles (an average of 1.4 h) with a 99.9% dependability.

On 8 September 2025, Embraer delivered the 1,900th E-Jet, an E190-E2 to Virgin Australia Regional Airlines. The aircraft features a special "1900th E-Jet" decal below the cabin windows.

In September 2026, Embraer delivered the 2,000th E-Jet, an E195-E2, to Azul Brazilian Airlines, a milestone that places the E-Jets as one of the three most successful commercial aircraft programs ever, behind only the Boeing 737 and Airbus A320 families.

=== E-Jets second generation ===
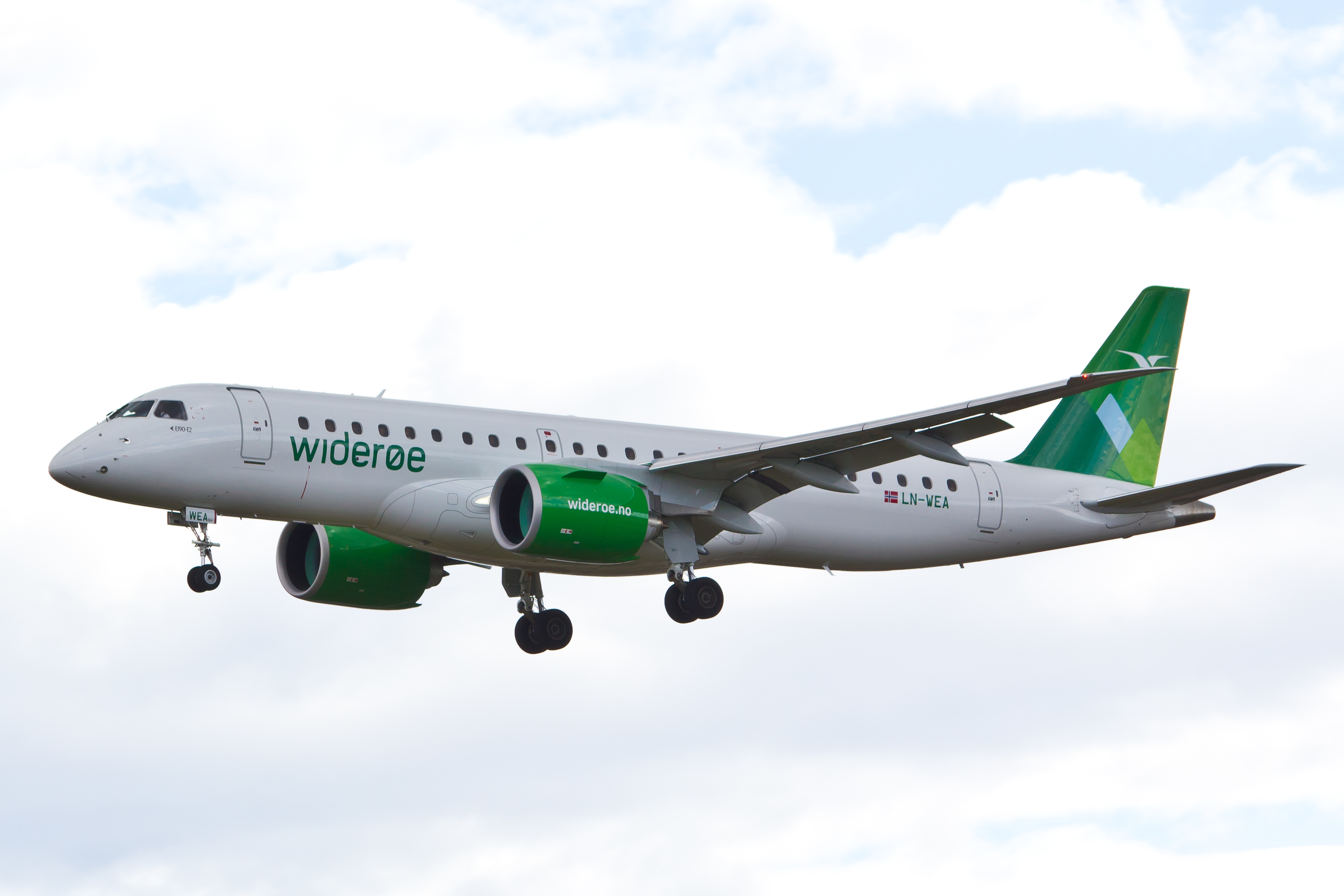
An E190-E2 of Widerøe, its launch operator

In November 2011, Embraer announced that it would develop revamped versions of the E-Jet to be called the E-Jet E2 family. The new jets would feature improved engines that would be more fuel efficient and take advantage of new technologies. Beyond the new engines, the E2 family would also feature new wings, improved avionics, and other improvements to the aircraft. The move came amid a period of high global fuel costs and better positions Embraer as competitors introduced new and more fuel efficient jets, including the Mitsubishi Regional Jet. The new aircraft family also includes a much larger variant, the E195-E2 capable of carrying between 120 and 146 passengers. This jet better positions Embraer against the competing Airbus A220 aircraft. The PW1000G was previously selected for use on competing aircraft.

In January 2013, Embraer selected the Pratt & Whitney PW1000G geared turbofan engine to power the E2 family.

On 28 February 2018, The E190-E2 received its type certificate from the ANAC, FAA and EASA. It was scheduled to enter service in the second quarter of 2018.

== Production in India (E-175) ==
Embraer and Adani Group of India signed a memorandum of understanding (MoU) in December 2025 on setting up a final assembly line in India for commercial aircraft having a seating capacity of 70–146 passengers. Adani Defence & Aerospace, the flagship company of the Adani Enterprises, signed an agreement with Embraer on 27 January at the Wings India to develop an integrated regional transport aircraft ecosystem in India. Firstly, an assembly line will be established followed by a phased increase in indigenisation to support India's Regional Transport Aircraft (RTA) program under the UDAN programme.

On 21 February 2026, during the visit of Brazilian president, Lula da Silva, to India, Embraer signed an enhanced MoU with Adani Defence & Aerospace to establish a production ecosystem for E-175 in India. Piyush Goyal, the India Minister of Commerce and Industry was present when the Embraer CEO, Francisco Gomes Neto, exchanged the agreement with Adani Defence & Aerospace director, Jeet Adani. Under the agreement, a final assembly line (FAL) for the aircraft will be set up in India. This was an advancement from the initial MoU signed in January.

Embraer expects a firm order of at least 200 aircraft to make the FAL facility in India feasible. Before that, the facility will act as a "completion centre", for painting the aircraft and fitting it with seats and other interior works before delivery. If the orders are placed, the FAL facility can be completed within 24 months of construction. The Embraer chief will also meet airline executives of Air India and IndiGo. Embraer has 15 supply chain partners from India.

== Design ==
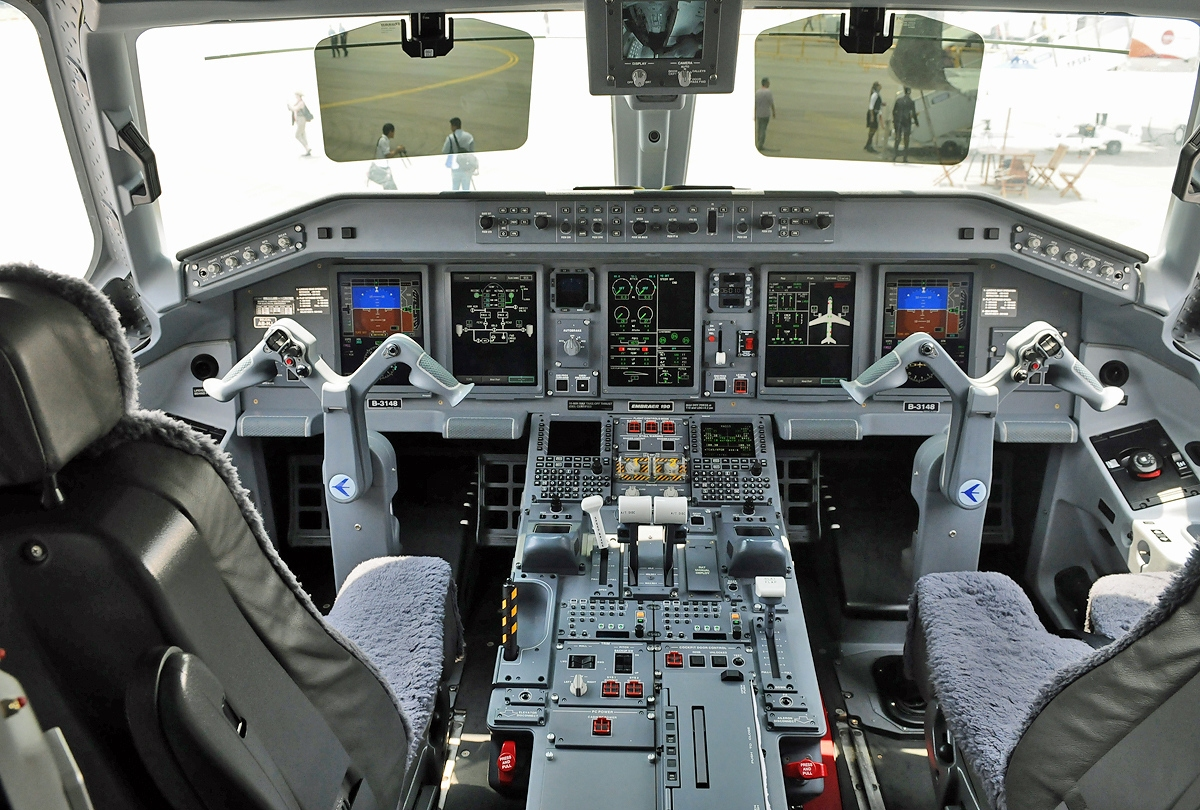
The flight deck of a China Southern Airlines Embraer E-Jet series aircraft

The Embraer E-Jet family is composed of two main commercial families and a business jet variant. The smaller E170 and E175 make up the base model aircraft, while the E190 and E195 are stretched versions, being powered by different engines and furnished with larger wing, horizontal stabilizer, and landing gear structures. From the onset, the E-Jet had been designed to be stretched. The E170 and E175 share 95% commonality, as do the E190 and E195; the two families share near 89% commonality, maintaining identical fuselage cross-sections and avionics fitouts. The E190 and E195 possess capacities similar to the initial versions of the McDonnell Douglas DC-9 and Boeing 737. All members of the E-Jet family are available in baseline, long range (LR), and advanced range (AR) models, the latter being intended for long routes with limited passenger numbers.

The smaller members of the E-Jet family are powered by the General Electric CF34-8E turbofan engine, each capable of generating up to 14,500 lbf (64 kN) of thrust, while the stretched aircraft are outfitted with the more powerful General Electric CF34-10E, capable of producing a maximum of 20,360 lbf (90.6 kN) thrust. These engines have been designed to minimise noise and emission outputs, exceeding the requirements established by the International Civil Aviation Organization; the relatively low acoustic signature has enabled the E-Jet to be operated from airports that have imposed strict noise restrictions, such as London City Airport. The type is also equipped with winglets that reduce fuel burn and thereby improve operational efficiency.

The E-Jet family is equipped with a fly-by-wire flight control system. The flight deck is furnished with the Honeywell Primus Epic Electronic flight instrument system (EFIS) suite and has been designed to facilitate a common type rating, enabling flight crews to be readily moved between different members of the family without the need for any retraining/recertifying and providing greater flexibility to operators. Early operations of the E-Jet were frequently troubled by avionics issues; by September 2008, Honeywell had issued software updates that sought to rectify the encountered issues.

The main cabin is configured with four-abreast seating (2+2) as standard, and features a "double-bubble" design that Embraer has purpose-developed for its commercial passenger jets to provide stand-up headroom. The dimensions of the cabin were intentionally comparable to the narrowbody airliners of Airbus and Boeing to permit greater comfort levels than most regional aircraft. Considerable attention to detail was reportedly paid by Embraer to elevating the type's passenger appeal. Many operators have chosen to outfit their aircraft with amenities such as Wi-Fi and at-seat power outlets. The windows of the E-Jet family are relatively large at 185 sq in (0.119 m^{2}) in comparison to most contemporary airliners, such as the 175 sq in (0.113 m^{2}) windows of the Boeing 787.

United and SkyWest have begun retrofitting their jointly operated E175 aircraft with larger "wheels first" overhead bins which can accommodate up to an extra 29 bags, an 80 percent increase in space. The airlines will modify 50 aircraft with the new bins in 2024, and if successful, plan to retrofit more than 150 aircraft by the end of 2026.

== Operational history ==
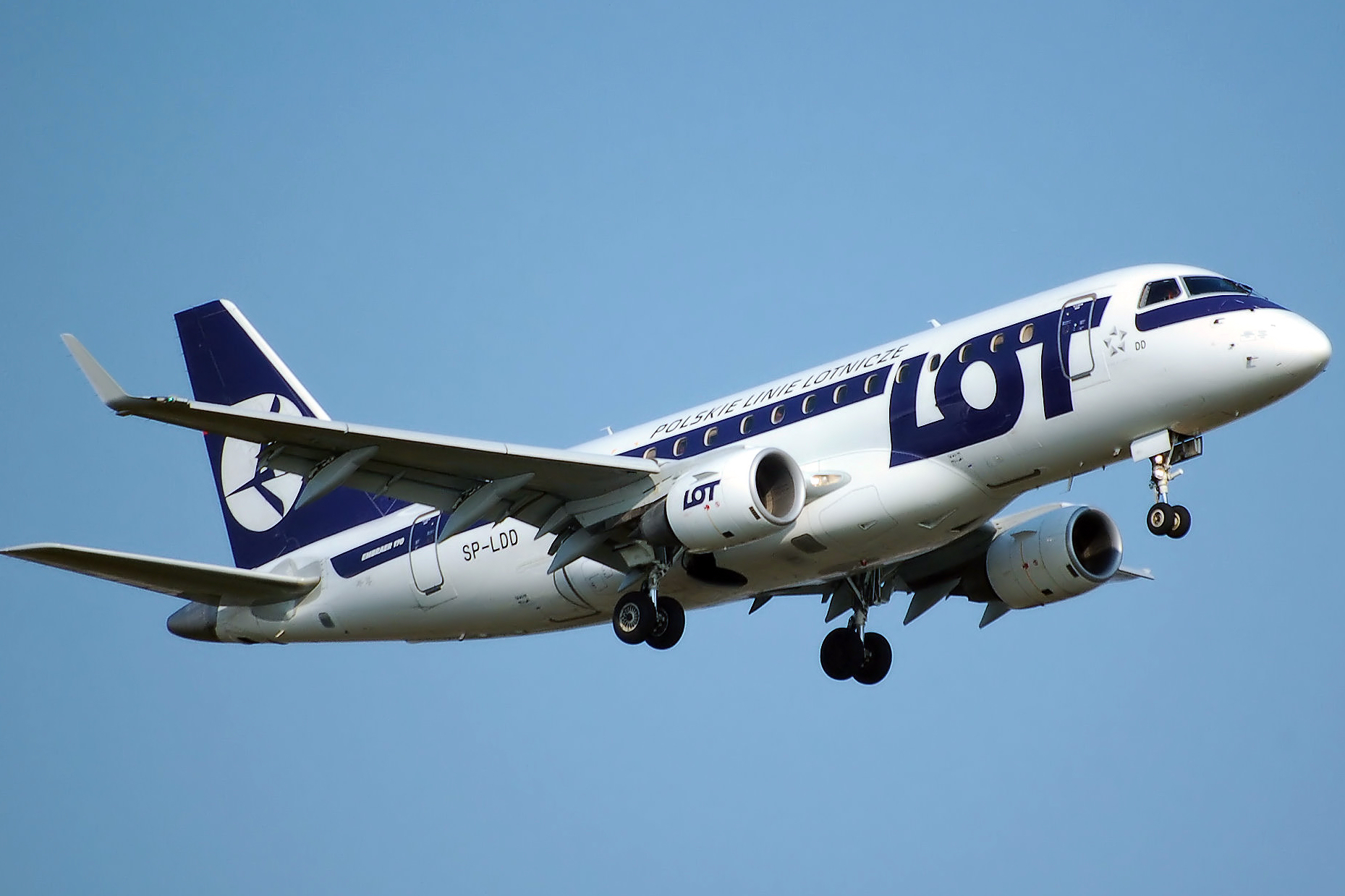
LOT Polish Airlines operated the first E-jet commercial flight on 17 March 2004 with an E170.

In early March 2004, the first E170 deliveries were made to LOT Polish Airlines, other customers to receive early deliveries were Alitalia and US Airways-subsidiary MidAtlantic Airways.

On 17 March 2004, LOT operated the first commercial flight of an E-Jet, which flew from Warsaw to Vienna. Within four years, LOT was sufficiently pleased with the type to order 12 additional E175s. Launch customer Crossair had in the meantime ceased to exist after its takeover of Swissair, leading to the cancellation of these orders. Furthermore, fellow launch customer Régional chose to defer its order, not receiving its first E-jet—an E190LR—until 2006.

On 30 October 2026 LOT Polish Airlines retired its last Embraer E170. Final operational flight was LO222 from Vienna to Warsaw Chopin Airport, completed by aircraft SP‑LDH on that date This route was symbolic, as it mirrored the inaugural E170 passenger flight in 2004 also between Warsaw and Vienna.

During July 2005, the first E175 was delivered to Air Canada, entering revenue service with the airline that same month.

In April 2013, Air Canada began the transfer of its 15-strong E175 fleet to subsidiary Sky Regional Airlines; this reorganisation was completed during September 2013. By July 2020, approximately 25 million passengers had flown on the Canadian fleet over a cumulative 650,000 flight hours, while a total of 25 E175s were in service on both domestic and transborder flights into the US, which were then being flown under the Air Canada Express branding. In March 2021, Air Canada announced its intention to consolidate all regional flying under the Jazz branding, thereby ending its affiliation between Sky Regional Airlines and Air Canada; accordingly, all of the E175s were transferred to Jazz.

Early operations of the E-Jet were not problem-free: the American operator JetBlue reported engine troubles with its fleet, while cold start hydraulic issues were experienced by Air Canada. Embraer had to undertake a rapid expansion of its product support network in order to satisfy the needs of its mainline operators; by October 2014, the company had two directly owned service centers, alongside nine authorized centers and 26 independent MRO organizations around the globe, while directly employing 1,200 staff for product support alone. In response to customer demands, the company also developed web-based support.

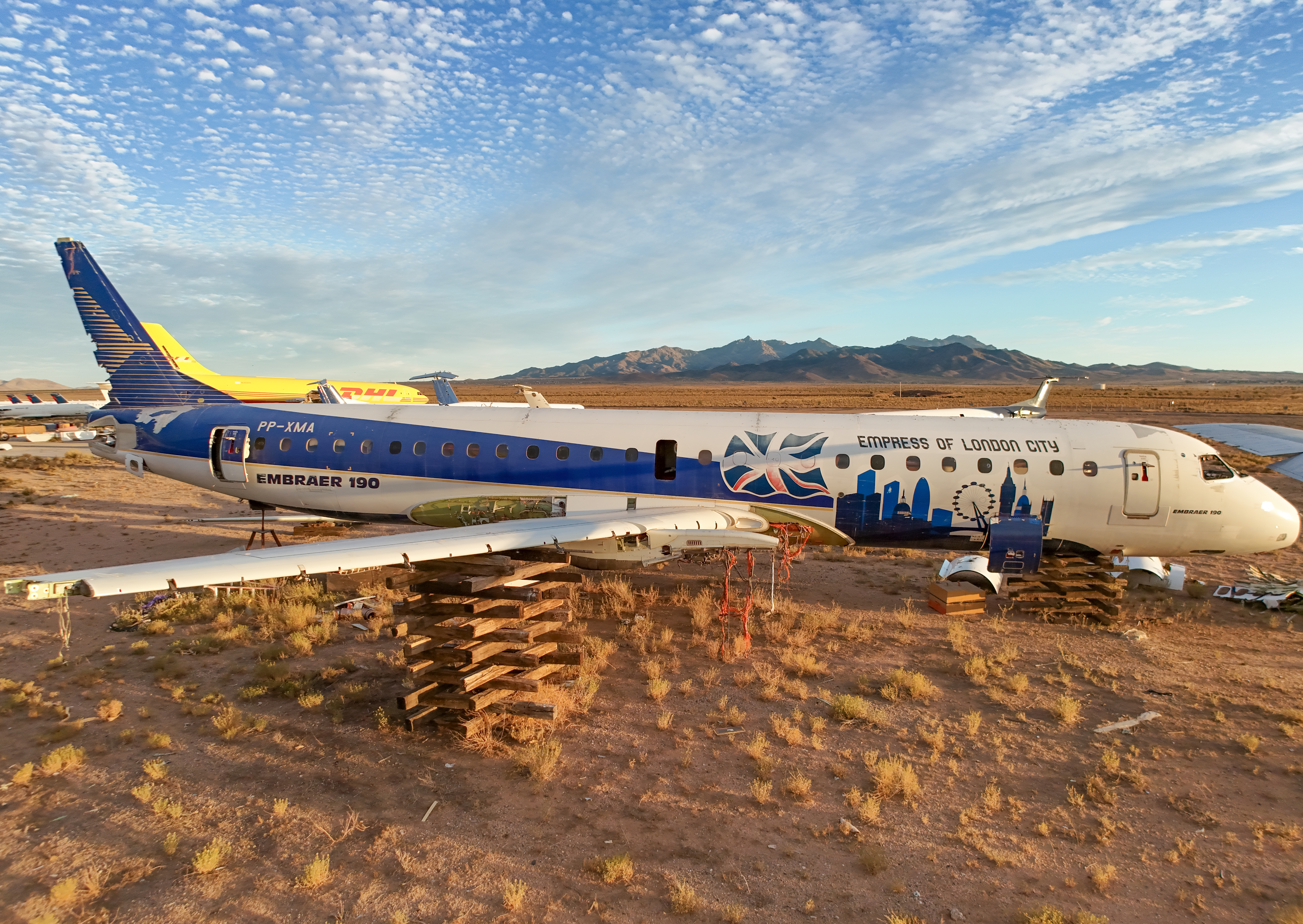
PP-XMA (nicknamed "Empress of London City") was the first E190 ever built, and it served as a test aircraft participating in various demonstration and certification flights. Here it is prepared to be scrapped at Kingman Airport, Arizona.

BA CityFlyer, a subsidiary of British Airways, operates a fleet of 21 E190s, typically flying routes from London City Airport to various destinations in the United Kingdom and continental Europe. CityFlyer has publicly stated that a key factor in it opting for the E-Jet over competitors such as the De Havilland Canada Dash 8 was its greater speed. The procurement of E-Jets by CityFlier led to other competing British regional airliners taking interest in the type; on 20 July 2010, Flybe ordered 35 E175s valued at US$1.3 billion (£850 million), along with options for 65 more (valued at $2.3 bn/£1.5 bn) and purchase rights for a further 40 (valued at $1.4 bn/£0.9 bn), deliveries of which commenced in November 2011.

On 6 November 2008, the longest flight of an E190 was flown by JetBlue from Anchorage Airport to Buffalo International Airport over 2,694 nmi (4,989 km; 3,100 mi), a re-positioning flight after a two-month charter for vice presidential candidate Sarah Palin.

On 14 October 2017, an Airlink E190-100IGW with 78 passengers aboard inaugurated the first scheduled commercial airline service in history to Saint Helena in the South Atlantic Ocean, arriving at Saint Helena Airport after a flight of about six hours from Johannesburg, South Africa, with a stop at Windhoek, Namibia. The flight began a once-per-week scheduled service by Airlink between Johannesburg and Saint Helena using E190 aircraft. The inaugural flight was only the second commercial flight to Saint Helena in the island's history, and the first since a chartered Airlink Avro RJ85 landed at Saint Helena Airport on 3 May 2017.

== Variants ==
=== E170 ===
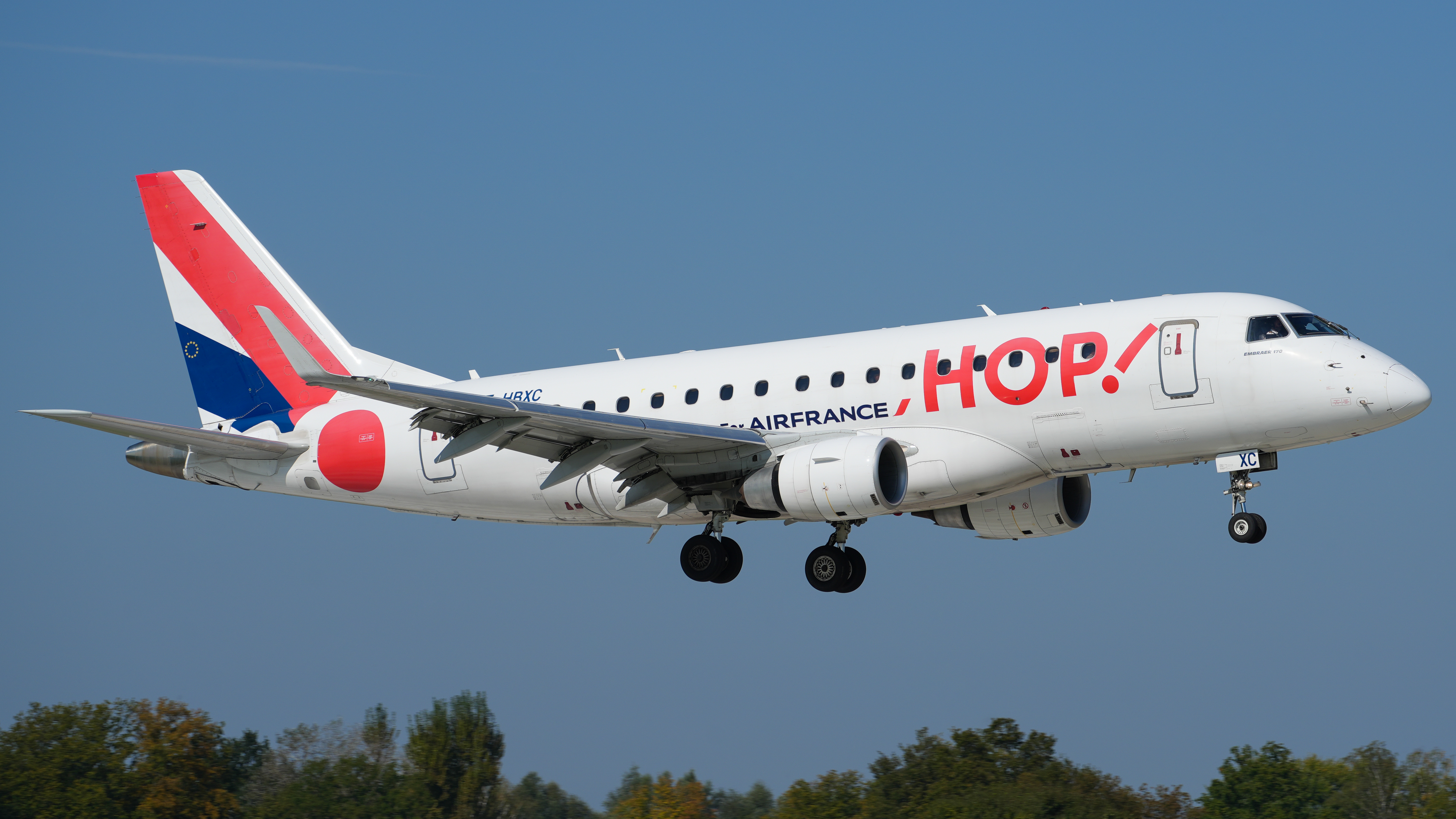
An Air France Hop E170

The E170 is the smallest aircraft in the E-Jet family and was the first to enter revenue service in March 2004. As of 2017, the E170 went out of production. The Embraer 170 typically seats around 72 passengers in a typical single class configuration, 66 in a dual class configuration, and up to 78 in a high-density configuration. The E170 directly competed with the Bombardier CRJ700 and loosely with the turboprop Bombardier Q400.

There are four variants of the E170, the E170STD, E170LR, E170SU, and E170SE. The E170STD is the base-line airframe, the E170LR increased its range by having a higher max take off weight (MTOW). The E170SU and E170SE are both based on the E170LR but limits its passenger number to 76 and 70 due to scope clauses.

The jet is powered with General Electric CF34-8E engines of 14,500 lbf (64 kN) thrust each.

=== E175 ===
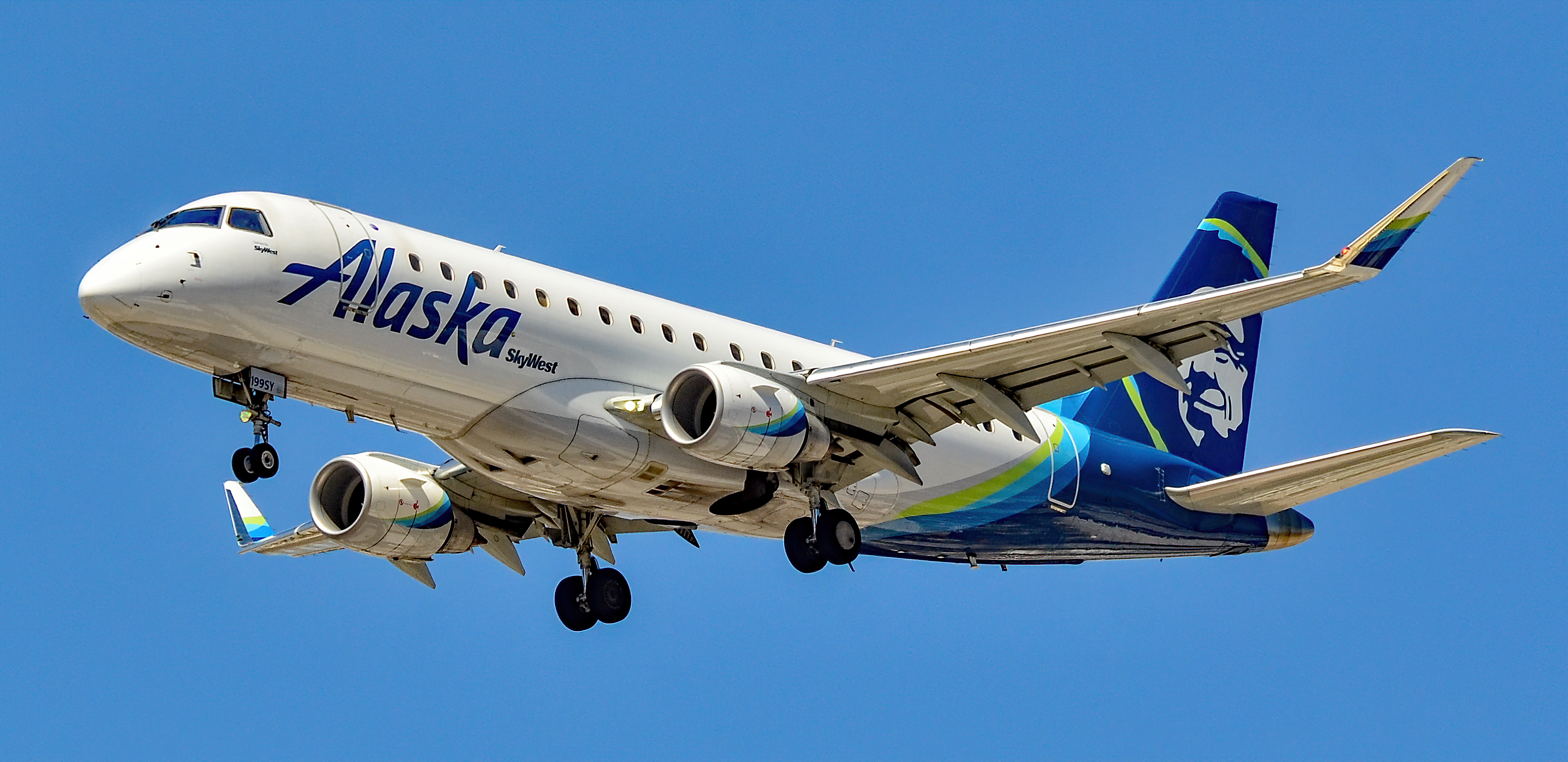
A SkyWest E175 operated for Alaska Airlines with angled winglets

The E175 is a slightly stretched version of the E170 and first entered revenue service with launch customer Air Canada in July 2005. The Embraer 175 typically seats around 78 passengers in a typical single-class configuration, 76 in a dual-class configuration, and up to 88 in a high-density configuration. Like the E170, it is powered by General Electric CF34-8E engines of 14,500 lbf (64 kN) of thrust each. It competed with the Bombardier CRJ900 in the market segment previously occupied by the earlier BAe 146 and Fokker 70. As of 2024, it is the only aircraft currently produced in this market segment.

The E175 was initially equipped with the same style of winglets as the rest of the E-Jet family. Starting in 2014, the winglets were made wider and more angled. Those winglets and other changes to the aircraft over time have improved efficiency. Embraer said that aircraft produced after 2017 consume 6.4% less fuel than original E175 aircraft. The angled winglets increase the wingspan from 26 to 28.65 m (85 ft 4 in to 93 ft 11 in). This winglet change was only made available to the E175 and no other models in the family.

There are four different variants of the E175 airframe, E175STD, E175LR, E175SU and E175SC. The E175STD (standard) is the base-line version of the E175, the E175LR (long range) increased its range by having a higher max take off weight (MTOW) and max ramp weight. The E175SU is based on the E175LR but limits its max passenger seating capacity to 76 due to American regional market scope clause limitations. In late 2017, Embraer announced the E175SC (special configuration) or E175LL, officially designated as ERJ 170-200 LL, limited to 70 seats like the E170 to take advantage of the E175 performance improvements but still comply with US airline scope clauses limiting operators to 70 seats. Embraer is marketing the E175SC as a replacement for the older 70-seat Bombardier CRJ700 with better efficiency and a larger first class.

In 2018, a new E175 had a value of US$27 million, projected to fall to US$3–8 million 13 years later due to their concentration in the US with more than 450 in service out of 560, with Republic and SkyWest operating over 120 each, Compass 35 and Envoy Air 90, after the similar experience with the CRJ200 and ERJ 145 demonstrates the limited remarketing opportunities.

As of 2024, the E175 remains in production, with strong demand from regional airlines in the United States, which cannot order the newer but heavier E175-E2 due to scope clause restrictions on maximum takeoff weight.

=== E190 ===
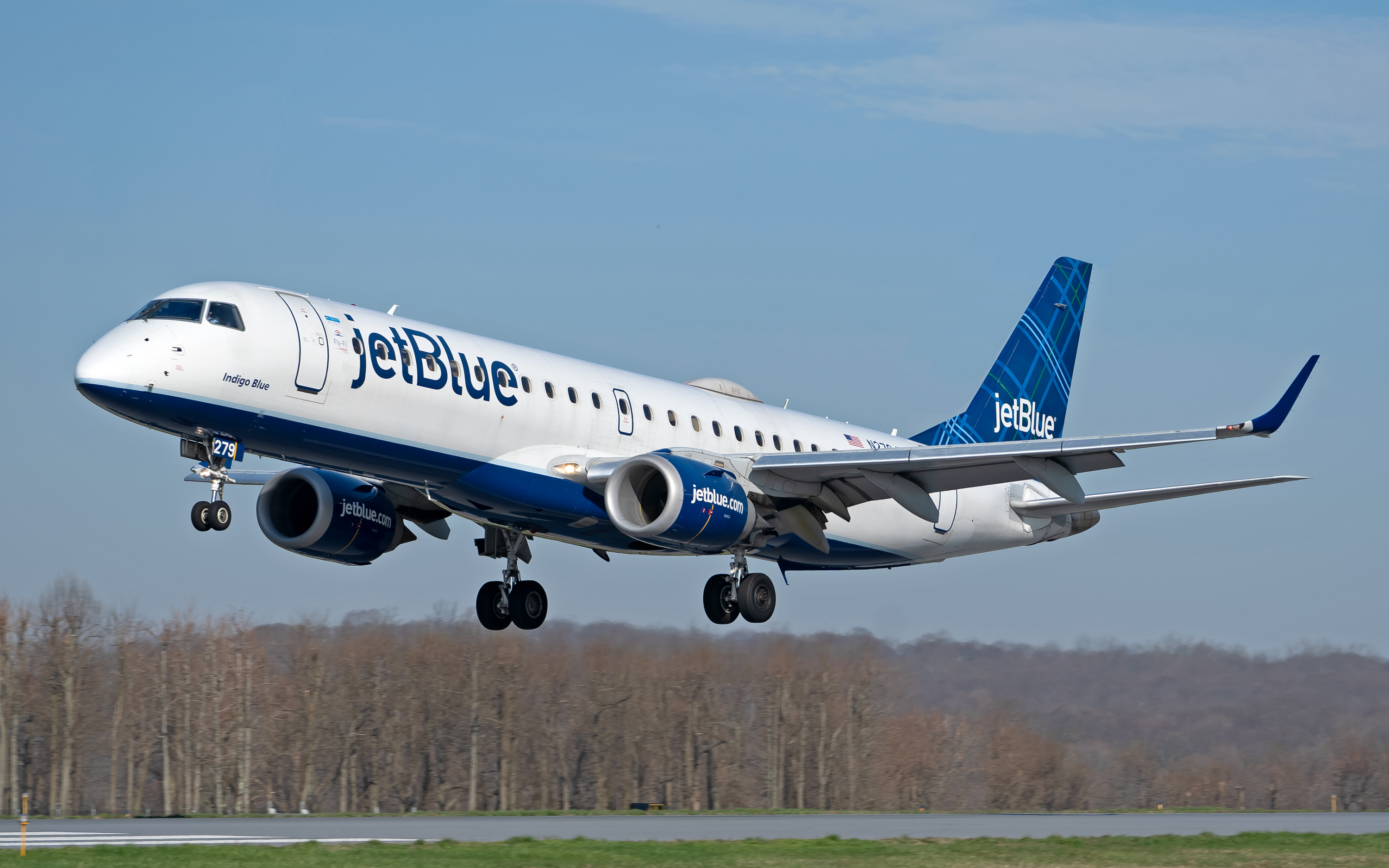
The E190 launch customer JetBlue took its first delivery in 2005.

The E190/195 models are larger stretches of the E170/175 models fitted with a new, larger wing, a larger horizontal stabilizer, adding two emergency overwing exits, and a new engine. Embraer 190 is fitted with two underwing-mounted General Electric CF34-10E turbofan engines, rated at 20,360 lbf (90.6 kN). The engines are equipped with full authority digital engine control (FADEC). The fully redundant, computerized management system continuously optimizes the engine performance resulting in reduced fuel consumption and maintenance requirements. The aircraft carries 13,000 kg (29,000 lb) of fuel and is fitted with a Parker Hannifin fuel system.

Embraer offered three variants of the E190: the STD (Standard), LR (Long Range) and AR (Advanced Range). The STD served as the base model, while the LR featured a maximum takeoff weight (MTOW) that was increased by 2,510 kg (5,530 lb) while the AR featured an MTOW that was further increased by 1,500 kg (3,300 lb) compared to LR, allowing more fuel to be carried. This enhancement extended the range by 50 nmi (93 km; 58 mi).

The aircraft is equipped with a Hamilton Sundstrand auxiliary power unit and electrical system. The GE CF34-10E, customers can choose between 5 different variants (-10E5, -10E5A1, -10E6, -10E6A1, -10E7), each with different performance and capabilities. It is the only powerplant offered for the aircraft. These aircraft compete with the Bombardier CRJ-1000. It can carry up to 100 passengers in a two-class configuration or up to 114 in the single-class high-density configuration.

On 12 March 2004, the first flight of the E190 took place. The launch customer of the E190 was New York-based low-cost carrier JetBlue with 100 orders options in 2003 and took its first delivery in 2005.

Air Canada operated 45 E190 aircraft fitted with 9 business-class and 88 economy-class seats as part of its primary fleet. They were retired in May 2020. American Airlines operated E190s until 2020. JetBlue and Georgian Airways operate the E190 as part of their own fleet.

The largest operator of the type is Alliance Airlines with 64 E190s in the fleet, which mostly took over from American Airlines and JetBlue to serve the Australian regional market. Other operators are Aeroméxico Connect (37), Tianjin Airlines (35), Airlink (29) and KLM Cityhopper (28).

By 2018, early E190s were valued at under US$10 million and could be leased for less than US$100,000 per month, while the most recent aircraft were worth US$30 million and could be leased for less than US$200,000 per month.

=== E195 ===
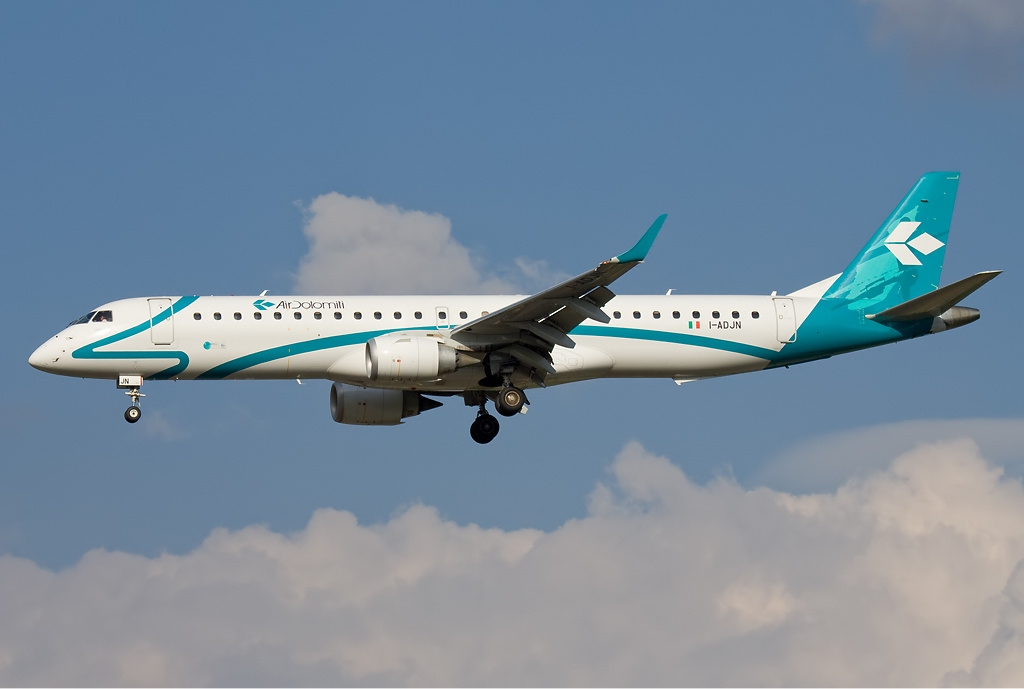
An Air Dolomiti Embraer 195

The Embraer 195 is the further stretch version of the Embraer 190, it is fitted with two underwing-mounted General Electric CF34-10E turbofan engines, customers can choose between 5 different variants (-10E5, -10E5A1, -10E6, -10E6A1, -10E7), each with different performance and capabilities. The engines are equipped with full authority digital engine control (FADEC). The fully redundant, computerized management system continuously optimizes the engine performance resulting in reduced fuel consumption and maintenance requirements. The aircraft carries 13,000 kg (29,000 lb) of fuel and is fitted with a Parker Hannifin fuel system.

Embraer offered three variants of the E190: the STD (Standard), LR (Long Range) and AR (Advanced Range). The STD served as the base model, while the LR featured a maximum takeoff weight (MTOW) that was increased by 2,510 kg (5,530 lb) while the AR featured a maximum takeoff weight (MTOW) that was further increased by 1,500 kg (3,300 lb) compared to LR, allowing more fuel to be carried. This enhancement extended the range by 300 nmi (560 km; 350 mi) for the E195.

The aircraft is equipped with a Hamilton Sundstrand auxiliary power unit and electrical system. The GE CF34-10E, rated at 20,360 lbf (90.6 kN), is the only powerplant offered for the aircraft. These aircraft compete with the Airbus A220-100, Boeing 717-200, Boeing 737-500, Boeing 737-600, and the Airbus A318. It can carry up to 100 passengers in a two-class configuration or up to 124 in the single-class high-density configuration.

The first flight of the E195 occurred on December 7, 2004. British low-cost carrier Flybe was the first operator of the E195, had 14 orders and 12 options, and started E195 operations on 22 September 2006. Prior to shutting down operations, Flybe decided that they would remove the aircraft from their fleet in favour of the Dash 8 Q400 and Embraer 175, in an effort to reduce costs, by 2020.

The largest operators of the largest variant in the E-Jet family are Azul Brazilian Airlines (45), Tianjin Airlines (17), Austrian Airlines (17), Air Dolomiti (17) and LOT Polish Airlines (16).

=== Freighter conversions ===
On 7 March 2022, Embraer confirmed their intent to enter the cargo market, offering conversions of E190 and E195 passenger aircraft to freighters. The E190F made its first flights in April 2024, with certification expected later in the year. The E190F will have a payload capacity of 10,700 kg (23,600 lb), while the E195F will offer 12,300 kg (27,100 lb). The company secured its first order in October 2022 for ten aircraft from lessor Nordic Aviation Capital, to be delivered to Astral Aviation as the launch operator. Astral later withdrew from the agreement, citing that the aircraft no longer aligned with its fleet strategy for the intra-African market. In early 2023, NAC was fully acquired by Dubai Aerospace Enterprise. Following the acquisition, NAC ceased participation in the E-Freighter programme.

In March 2026, the E190F entered commercial service in Europe with Bridges Air Cargo, marking a key milestone in the rollout of Embraer's passenger-to-freighter conversion program for the E-Jet family.

In July 2026, Embraer decided not to pursue a conversion program for the E195, citing an insufficient number of available aircraft. According to Embraer Commercial Aviation CEO Arjan Meijer, the company determined that it could not remove enough aircraft from passenger service to support the program. He added that an E195 conversion would require additional investment and that Embraer would instead focus on the E190 conversion program.

=== Embraer Lineage 1000 ===
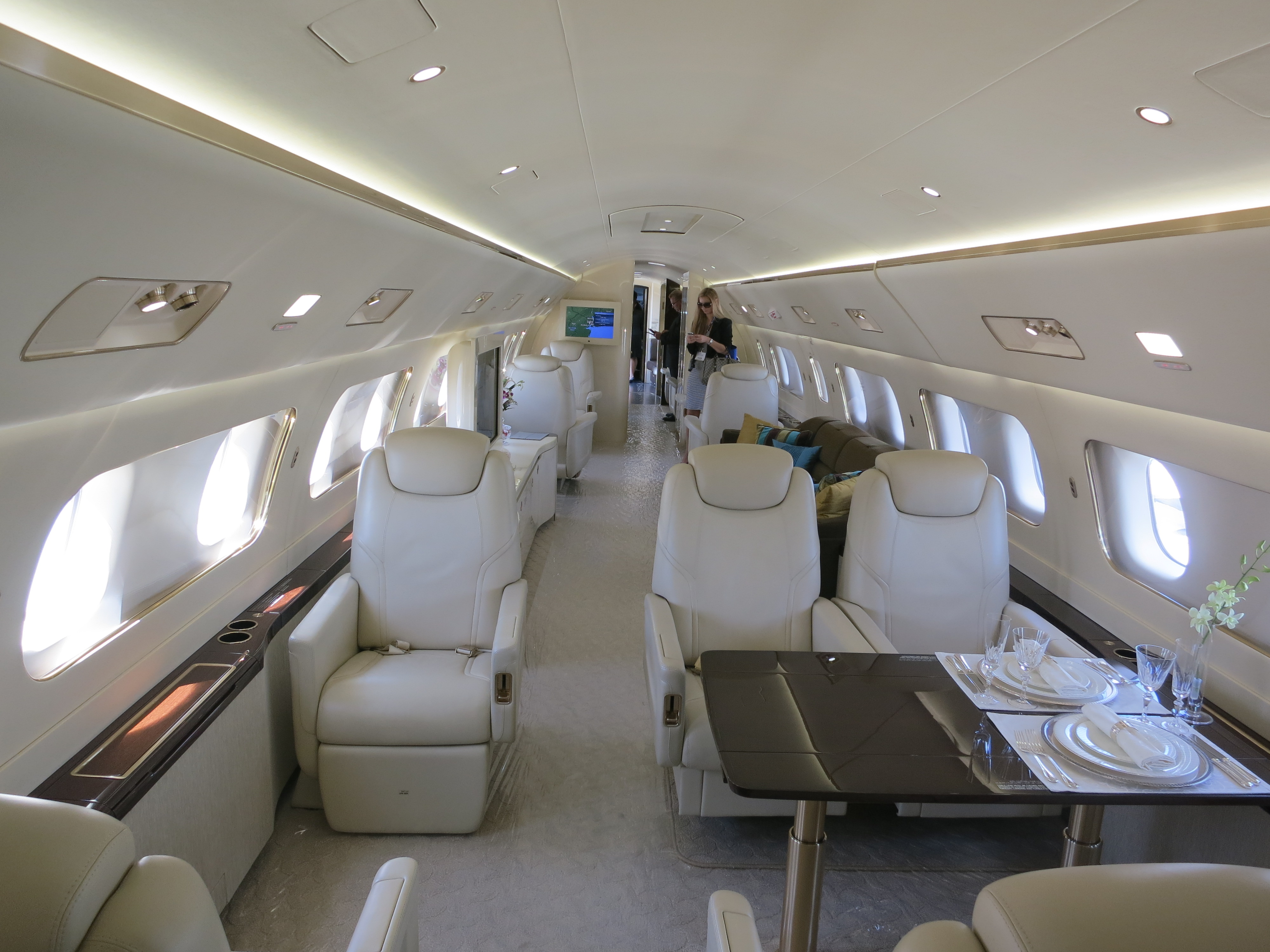
Lineage 1000 cabin

On 2 May 2006, Embraer announced plans for the business jet variant of the E190, the Embraer Lineage 1000. It has the same structure as the E190, but with an extended range of up to 4,200 nmi (7,800 km; 4,800 mi), and luxury seating for up to 19.

The Lineage 1000 offers two different engine choices, the GE CF34-10E6 and the more powerful CF34-10E7-B. It was certified by the US Federal Aviation Administration on 7 January 2009. The first two production aircraft were delivered in December 2008.

=== Undeveloped variants ===
Embraer considered producing an aircraft which was known as the E195X, a stretched version of the E195. It would have seated approximately 130 passengers. The E195X was apparently a response to an American Airlines request for an aircraft to replace its McDonnell Douglas MD-80s. Embraer abandoned plans for the 195X in May 2010, following concerns that its flight range would be too short.

=== Military variants ===
==== VC-2 ====
Since 2009, the 1st Squadron of the Brazilian Air Force's Special Transport Group (GTE-1) has operated two E190PR aircraft as VIP transports under the designation VC-2.

=== Commercial names and official model designations ===
The commercial names used for the E170 and E190 families differ from the official model designations, as used (for instance) with the Type-Certificates, and in national registries.

Marketing designation	Official model designation	Remarks
Embraer 170STD	ERJ 170-100 STD	
Embraer 170LR	ERJ 170-100 LR	
Embraer 170SE	ERJ 170-100 SE	FAA only
Embraer 170SU	ERJ 170-100 SU	FAA only
Embraer 175STD	ERJ 170-200 STD	
Embraer 175LR	ERJ 170-200 LR	
Embraer 175SU	ERJ 170-200 SU	FAA only
Embraer 175LL	ERJ 170-200 LL	FAA only
Embraer Lineage 1000	ERJ 190-100 ECJ	
Embraer 190AR	ERJ 190-100 IGW	
Embraer 190LR	ERJ 190-100 LR	
Embraer 190SR	ERJ 190-100 SR	
Embraer 190STD	ERJ 190-100 STD	
Embraer 195AR	ERJ 190-200 IGW	
Embraer 195LR	ERJ 190-200 LR	
Embraer 195STD	ERJ 190-200 STD	

== Operators ==
As of June 2025, the three largest operators of the E-Jet family were SkyWest Airlines (263), Republic Airways (208), and Envoy Air (152), operating variably for Alaska Airlines, American Eagle, Delta Connection, and United Express.

=== Orders and deliveries ===
List of Embraer's E-Jet family deliveries and orders:

Model	Orders	Deliveries	Backlog
E170	191	191	—N/a
E175	1,003	840	163
E190	568	568	—N/a
E195	172	172	—N/a
Total	1,934	1,771	163

Embraer E-Jets firm order backlog
Customer	Country	E175
Air Côte d'Ivoire	Côte d'Ivoire	4
Air Peace	Nigeria	1
American Airlines	United States	66
Fuji Dream Airlines	Japan	2
Overland Airways	Nigeria	1
Republic Airways	United States	26
SkyWest Airlines	United States	63
Totals		163

== Accidents and incidents ==
The E-Jet has been involved in 22 incidents, including nine hull losses:

=== Accidents with fatalities ===
Henan Airlines Flight 8387 – 44 casualties
On 24 August 2010, Henan Airlines Flight 8387, an E190 that departed from Harbin, China, crash-landed about 1 km short of the runway at Yichun Lindu Airport, resulting in 44 deaths. The final investigation report, released in June 2012, concluded that the flight crew failed to observe safety procedures for operations in low visibility.
Tianjin Airlines Flight 7554 – 2 casualties among hijackers
On 29 June 2012, Tianjin Airlines Flight 7554, six passengers carrying explosives stood up and announced a hijacking, but they were subdued by other passengers. The E190 returned to Hotan Airport where the hijackers were apprehended and two of them later died in hospital from injuries received in the fight.
LAM Mozambique Airlines Flight 470 – 33 casualties
On 29 November 2013, LAM Mozambique Airlines Flight 470, an E190, crashed in Namibia, killing all 33 aboard (27 passengers, 6 crew members) by the deliberate actions of the pilot. The first officer reportedly left the cockpit to use the bathroom. He was then locked out by the captain, who dramatically reduced the aircraft's altitude and ignored various automated warnings ahead of the high-speed impact.
Azerbaijan Airlines Flight 8243 – 38 casualties
On 25 December 2024, a Russian Pantsir-S1 air-defence system attacked the plane. The E190 sustained damage from the attack and crashed in Kazakhstan while attempting to land. Out of the 67 people on board, 38 were killed, and 29 others survived.

=== Hull losses with no fatalities ===
On 17 July 2007, Aero República Flight 7330 overran the runway while landing at Simón Bolívar International Airport in Santa Marta, Colombia. The E190 slid down an embankment off the side of the runway and came to rest with the nose in shallow water. The aircraft was damaged beyond repair, but all 60 aboard evacuated unharmed.

On 16 September 2011, an E190 operated by TAME landed long and ran off the end of the runway at Mariscal Sucre International Airport in Quito, colliding with approach equipment and a brick wall. The crew reportedly failed to adhere to the manufacturer's procedures in the event of a flap malfunction, continuing the approach in spite of the aircraft's condition. Eleven of the 103 aboard received minor injuries, and the aircraft was written off.

On 31 July 2018, Aeroméxico Connect Flight 2431, an E190 bound for Mexico City, crashed in Durango, Mexico shortly after takeoff. 99 passengers and 4 crew were on board. Although there were no fatalities, the aircraft was destroyed by the ensuing fire. The probable cause was attributed to "loss of control [...] by low altitude windshear that caused a loss of speed and lift" with contributing factors from the crew and the Navigation Services.

On 11 November 2018, Air Astana Flight 1388 on a flight from Alverca Airbase, Portugal, to Almaty suffered severe control issues including flipping over and diving sharply. The crew activated the direct mode for flight controls which allowed sufficient control to make an emergency landing on the third attempt at Beja Airbase in Portugal with serious damage sustained during these high-G maneuvers. It was subsequently written-off and broken up. The investigation revealed that the aileron cables were installed incorrectly, causing reversal of aileron controls. The investigation blamed the manufacturer of the airplane for the poorly written maintenance instructions, the supervising authorities for lack of oversight over the maintenance crew, who lacked the skill to perform the maintenance, and the flight crew for failing to notice the condition during pre-flight control checks.

On 18 February 2024, Air Serbia Flight 324 from Belgrade Nikola Tesla Airport to Dusseldorf International Airport, operated by an E195 leased from Marathon Airlines, overran the runway on take-off and struck the runway's instrument landing system antenna array. The aircraft sustained substantial damage to the fuselage, left wing root, and left stabiliser. After 58 minutes, the aircraft landed back safely at Belgrade, and there were no casualties. After the incident, Air Serbia cancelled its contract with Marathon Airlines; the aircraft will reportedly be retired and scrapped.

=== Other incidents ===
On 22 October 2023, Horizon Air Flight 2059 was operating from Paine Field in Everett, Washington to San Francisco International Airport when Joseph David Emerson, an off-duty pilot sitting in the jumpseat inside the cockpit, attempted to activate the fire suppression systems on both engines, which would have cut the fuel supply. The E175 aircraft was operating at 31,000 feet at the time, and had Emerson been successful at activating the system both engines would have shut down. The crew was able to subdue him and land at the Portland International Airport in Oregon, where Emerson was arrested and later charged with 83 counts of attempted murder.

On 26 November 2025, Vilnius Airport was closed after LOT Flight 771, landing from Warsaw Chopin Airport veered off the taxiway after touchdown.

== Preserved aircraft ==
- JA04FJ – formerly N866RW, nose section preserved at Matsumoto Airport.

== Specifications ==
Variant	E170	E175	E190	E195
Cockpit crew	Two			
Typical seating	66 (6J + 60Y)	76 (12J + 64Y)	96 (8J + 88Y)	100 (12J + 88Y)
Maximum seats	78	88	114	124
Height × width	2.00 m × 2.74 m (6 ft 7 in × 9 ft 0 in)			
Length	29.90 m (98 ft 1 in)	31.67 m (103 ft 11 in)	36.25 m (118 ft 11 in)	38.66 m (126 ft)
Wingspan	26.01 m (84 ft 4 in)	STD: 26.01 m (84 ft 4 in); LR: 28.65 m (94 ft)	28.73 m (94 ft 3 in)	
Wing area	72.72 m^{2} (783 sq ft)		92.53 m^{2} (996 sq ft)	
Aspect ratio	9.3		8.91	
Height	9.83 m (32 ft 3 in)	9.86 m (32 ft 4 in)	10.57 m (34 ft 8 in)	10.54 m (34 ft 7 in)
Maximum takeoff weight	38,600 kg (85,098 lb)	40,370 kg (89,000 lb)	51,800 kg (114,199 lb)	52,290 kg (115,280 lb)
Operating empty weight	21,141 kg (46,608 lb)	21,890 kg (48,259 lb)	27,837 kg (61,370 lb)	28,667 kg (63,200 lb)
Maximum payload	9,759 kg (21,515 lb)	10,110 kg (22,289 lb)	13,063 kg (28,800 lb)	13,933 kg (30,716 lb)
Max fuel	9,335 kg (20,580 lb)		12,971 kg (28,596 lb)	
Turbofans (2×)	General Electric CF34-8E		General Electric CF34-10E	
Thrust (2×)	14,200 lbf (63 kN)		20,000 lbf (89 kN)	
Maximum speed	Mach .82 (470 kn; 871 km/h; 541 mph) @ 41,000 ft (12,000 m)			
Service ceiling	41,000 ft (12,479 m)			
Cruise	Mach .75 (430 kn; 797 km/h; 495 mph)		Mach .78 (447 kn; 829 km/h; 515 mph)	
Range (Note: 100 nm alternate, typical mission reserves)	2,150 nmi (3,982 km; 2,470 mi)	2,200 nmi (4,074 km; 2,500 mi)	2,450 nmi (4,537 km; 2,820 mi)	2,300 nmi (4,260 km; 2,600 mi)
Takeoff (MTOW, ISA, SL)	1,644 m (5,394 ft)	2,244 m (7,363 ft)	2,100 m (6,890 ft)	2,179 m (7,149 ft)
Landing (MLW, ISA, SL)	1,241 m (4,072 ft)	1,261 m (4,137 ft)	1,244 m (4,081 ft)	1,275 m (4,183 ft)
References				

== See also ==
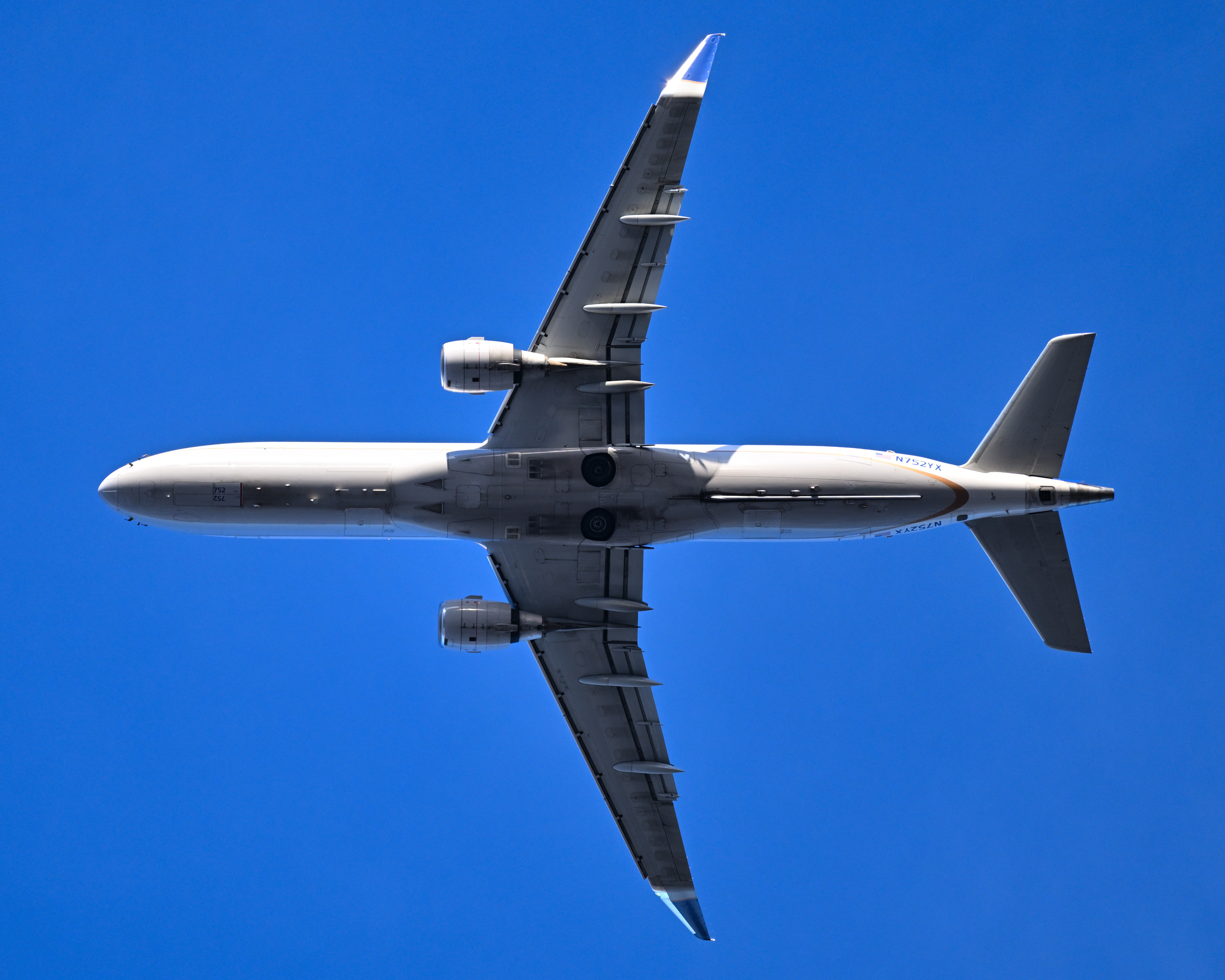
E175 planform view

Related development

- Embraer Lineage 1000
- Embraer E-Jet E2 family

Aircraft of comparable role, configuration, and era

- Airbus A220-100 (2017–, 108–128 seats)
- Airbus A318 (2003–2013, 107–132 seats)
- Antonov An-148 (2009–, 68–99 seats)
- Boeing 717 (1999–2006, 106–134 seats)
- Boeing 737-600 (1998–2006, 108–130 seats)
- Bombardier CRJ700 series (2001–2020, 66–104 seats)
- Comac C909 (2016–, 78–105 seats)
- Sukhoi Superjet 100 (2011–, 87–108 seats)

Related lists

- List of jet airliners
- List of civil aircraft
- List of active Brazilian military aircraft

== Bibliography ==
- Eden, Paul E. (2016). The World's Most Powerful Civilian Aircraft. Rosen Publishing Group. ISBN 978-1-4994-6589-1.
