= Yichun Lindu Airport =

Domestic airport serving the city of Yichun, Heilongjiang Province, China

Yichun Lindu Airport 伊春林都机场
- IATA: LDS; ICAO: ZYLD

Summary
- Airport type: Public
- Serves: Yichun, Heilongjiang
- Elevation AMSL: 241 m / 791 ft
- Coordinates: 47°45′07″N 129°01′08″E

Map
- Location of airport in Heilongjiang

Runways
| Direction | Length | | Surface |
| Direction | m | ft | Surface |
|---|---|---|---|
| 12/30 | 2,300 | 7,546 | Concrete |

Statistics (2021)
- Passengers: 127,546
- Aircraft movements: 1,588
- Cargo (metric tons): 0.5

Yichun Lindu Airport
- Simplified Chinese: 伊春林都机场
- Traditional Chinese: 伊春林都機場
Transcriptions
Standard Mandarin
- Hanyu Pinyin: Yīchūn Líndū Jīchǎng

Yichun Lindu Airport (IATA: LDS, ICAO: ZYLD) is an airport serving the city of Yichun in northeast China's Heilongjiang Province. It started operations in August 2009, and is capable of serving 142,000 passengers a year. It is located in a forest approximately 9 kilometres (5.6 mi) from downtown Yichun. It replaced the old airport (ZYYC) which was near the center of Yichun (47°43'00.0"N 128°49'55.0"E).

In August 2010, the crash of Henan Airlines Flight 8387 occurred at the airport which killed 44.

== Airlines and destinations ==
| Airlines | Destinations |
|---|---|
| Chengdu Airlines | Harbin, Heihe |
| China Eastern Airlines | Dalian, Shanghai–Pudong |
| China Southern Airlines | Guangzhou, Shenyang |
| China United Airlines | Beijing–Daxing |

== See also ==
- List of airports in China
- List of the busiest airports in China
