= Chen Feng (businessman) =

Chinese businessman

- 陈峰
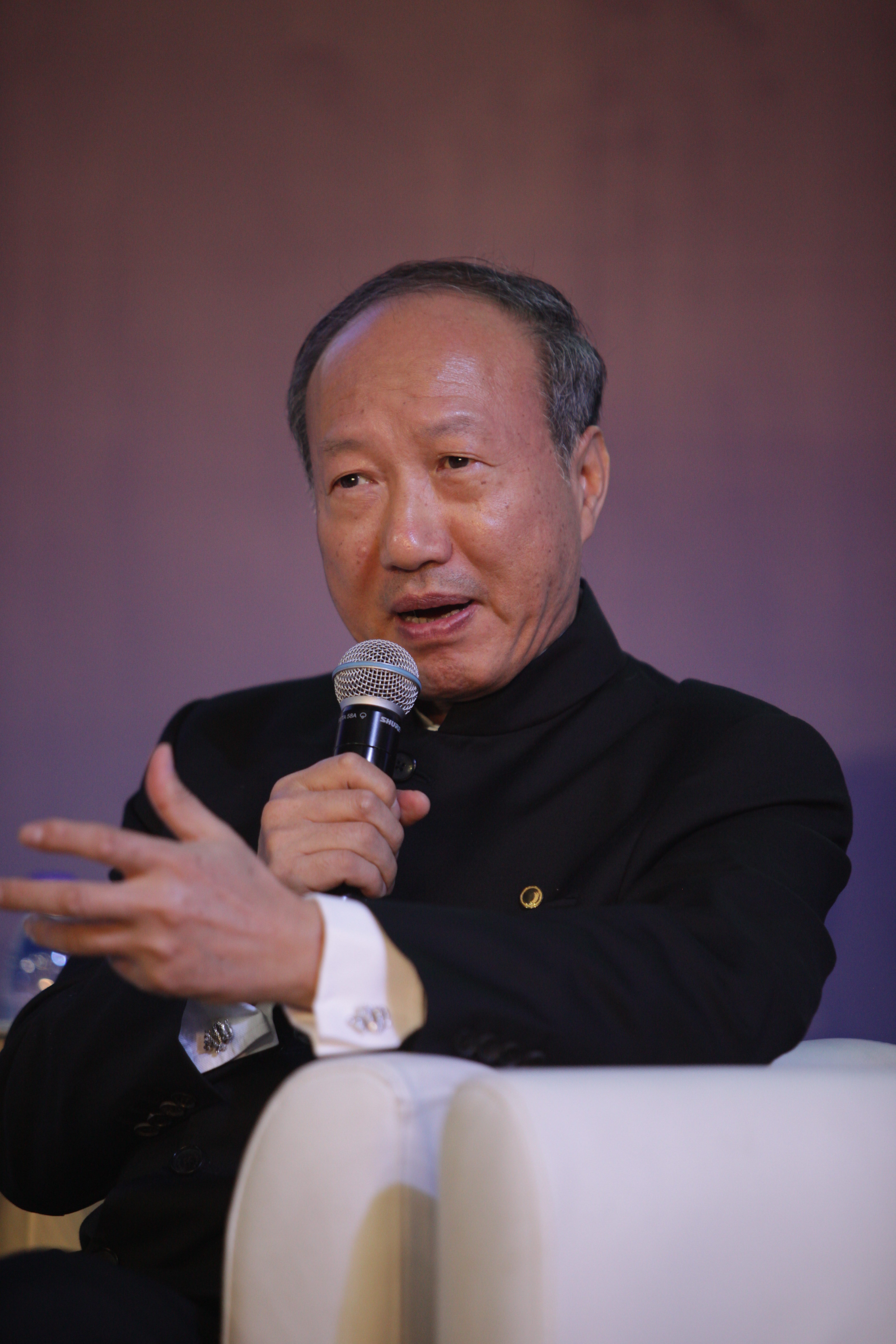
- Chen in April 2014
- Born: June 1953 (age 72–73); Huozhou, Shanxi, China
- Education: Maastricht School of Management (MBA)
- Occupation: Businessman
- Known for: Co-founder of HNA Group and Hainan Airlines

Chen Feng (Chinese: 陈峰; born June 5, 1953) is a Chinese businessman and founder of business conglomerate HNA Group, now defunct, and Hainan Airlines.

He was on the Forbes China Rich List in 2017 with a net worth of $1.69 billion USD, but subsequently dropped off the list in 2018.

== Early life and education ==
Chen Feng was born on June 5, 1953 in Huozhou, Shanxi province and raised in Beijing, the son of middle-rank Communist Party officials. During the Cultural Revolution, Chen worked for the People's Liberation Army Air Force in Sichuan; after the revolution was over in 1979, Feng worked for the Civil Aviation Administration of China and the National Air Regulations Bureau in China. In 1984, he won a scholarship to study at the Lufthansa College of Air Transportation Management in Germany. In 1989, he took a job at the World Bank's loan office in Haikou and in 1990, he went to work for the Aviation Business Assistant to Provincial Governor in Hainan province which had seen a surge in development as a tourist destination.

Chen earned an MBA from the Maastricht School of Management in the Netherlands in 1995 and studied at Harvard Business School in 2002.

== Career ==
After efforts by Hainan Province to establish a regional airline (Hainan Provincial Airlines) were not successful, Chen was tasked with bringing in private expertise and investment. Chen was able to raise 250 million yuan (US$31.25 million) in new capital, 75% from 24 institutional investors, 20% from existing corporate staff, and 5% from the Hainan government. In 1993, Chen launched the Hainan Airlines Company Limited China's first joint-stock air-transport enterprise. Due to the 1997 Asian financial crisis - which caused the collapse of several local financial and real estate companies - the airline was recapitalized by the Hainan government and restructured and its name changed to Hainan Airlines (HNA) Company, Ltd. Hainan province was particularly affected by the crisis due to it being both a tourist and retirement destination that had seen a high amount of speculative development and lending. In 1995, George Soros invested $25 million in the airline for a 14.8% stake, becoming its largest shareholder.

=== Hainan Airlines ===
In 2000, the Chinese national government forced the creation of three major domestic aviation companies: Air China Ltd., China Eastern Airlines Corp, and China Southern Airlines, which accelerated Chen's plans for expansion. In 2000, Chen co-founded a holding company, the HNA Group, together with partner Wang Jian, and used it as a vehicle to purchase Xi'an-based Chang'an Airlines in August 2000 and China Xinhua Airlines and Shanxi Airlines, both in 2001. In August 2001, Hainan Airlines merged with Haikou-based Meilan International Airport in Hainan province. Despite the mergers and acquisitions, Hainan Airlines remains the 4th player in China with 15% market share in 2012. In June 2006, Chen created another holding company, Grand China Airlines Holdings, to hold the airline assets of the HNA Group - then consisting of 100 planes and 30 billion yuan (US$3.75 billion) in assets, freeing the HNA Group to expand into other business lines. At the time, Chen owned 32.75% of Grand China Airline Holdings shares. In 2012, the HNA Group had sales of US$17.5 billion and pre-tax profits of US$837 million. The group structure of the HNA Group is known to be extremely complicated.

=== HNA Group ===
Chen was able to go on an acquisition spree - using his holding company, the HNA Group, as the primary purchasing vehicle - and expanded its operations into logistics, retail, property, tourism, and financial services. Commenting on future growth, Chen stated in 2014: "By 2020, we can become one of the top 100 companies, and by 2030, we want to be one of the top 50...Assets are still cheap in the U.S. and Europe, and we will continue to acquire them. We need a batch of world-class companies to emerge from China to help the country's growth, and HNA will be one of those. We want to be everywhere."

At one time, the group had the largest stake in Deutsche Bank.

According to the HNA Group website, in 2015, the HNA Group included controlling stakes in 11 listed companies, revenues of RMB 190 billion ($25.6 billion USD), group assets of RMB 600 billion, and over 180,000 employees worldwide.

In May 2017, HNA Group's stocks fell by 16.7%, its biggest intraday drop since November 18, 2015, following allegations by Guo Wengui of infighting and wrongdoing of Chinese leaders, although the direct causation could not be established.

According to WSJ on September 24, 2021, embattled Chinese conglomerate HNA Group said on Friday that its chairman Chen Feng and Chief Executive Adam Tan are suspected of committing crimes and have been detained.

HNA said on its official social media account that the pair were "placed under compulsory measures," citing a notice from the Hainan police. It added that the company's operations remain orderly.

As of September 24, 2021, HNA Group was broken into 4 components due to a bankruptcy court order. Liaoning Fangda Group Industrial Company Ltd, a conglomerate with business in the carbon, steel, and pharmaceuticals, will invest in the airline component.

== Personal life ==
Chen is a Buddhist and does not drink or smoke.
