= HNA Aviation =

Chinese aviation group

HNA Aviation Group Co., Ltd.

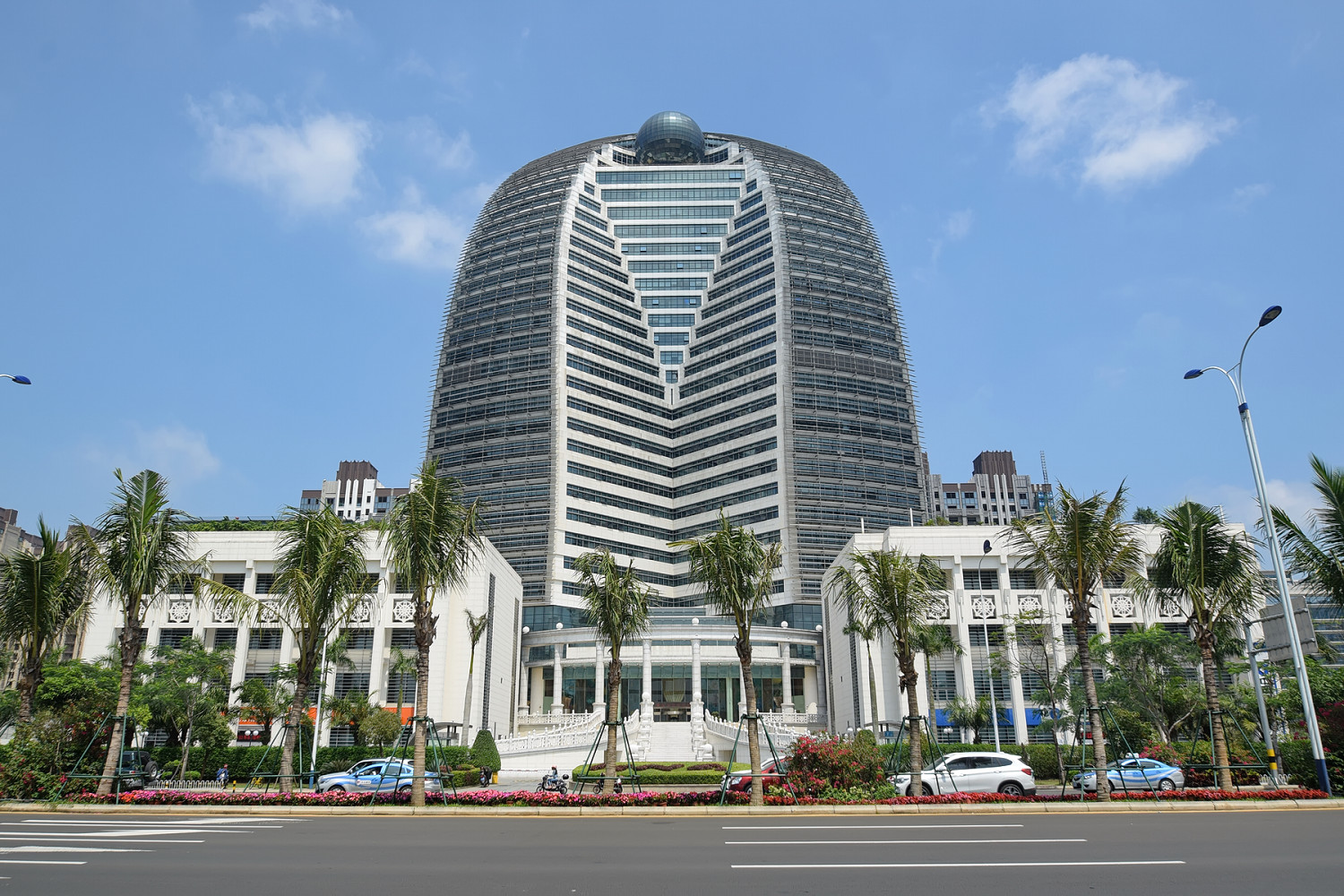
- HNA Building, Haikou
- Formerly: HNA Aviation Holdings Co., Ltd.
- Type: Public
- ISIN: 91460000681176537B
- Industry: Aviation
- Founded: January 19, 2009; 17 years ago in Haikou, China
- Founder: Cheng Feng; Wang Jian
- Headquarters: Haikou, Hainan, China
- Key people: Ding Yongzheng (Chairman)
- Owner: Hainan Fangda Aviation Development Co., Ltd. (95%)
- Subsidiaries: Hainan Airlines Holdings (33%); Grand China Air (99%)
- Website: https://www.hexiefangda.com/column/141/

HNA Aviation Group Co., Ltd, previously HNA Aviation Holdings Co., Ltd. commonly known as HNA Aviation, is an aviation group based in China, formerly the aviation division of the now defunct HNA Group. It is the country's fourth biggest aviation group and is headquartered in Haikou, Hainan, China.

== History ==
=== 2009 ===
On January 19, its previous owner HNA Group Co., Ltd. invested RMB 935,000 to establish HNA Aviation Holdings Co., Ltd.

=== 2014 ===
On July 7, 2014, HNA Aviation Holdings Co., Ltd. changed its name to HNA Aviation Group Co., Ltd.

=== 2021 ===
On February 10, following the bankruptcy of the parent company HNA Group., the Hainan Provincial High People's Court ruled to accept the reorganization case of seven companies, including HNA Aviation, and designated the clearing group of HNA Group as the manager of the above-mentioned companies. On March 13 of the same year, the Hainan High Court ruled to carry out substantial merger and reorganization of 321 companies, including HNA Group, which includes HNA Aviation.

According to the reorganization plan formulated by the clearing group of HNA Group, HNA Group will set up trusts to pay off debts, and all businesses will be reorganized in sections, but the aviation sector will be reorganized separately by introducing strategic investors. The reorganization plan selects HNA Aviation as a platform company for air transportation business management. Strategic investors will acquire HNA Aviation by cash capital increase, and the trust plan will continue to participate in aviation group. The equity of all shareholders of Shanxi Airlines and Chang'an Airlines held by HNA Aviation has been adjusted to be held by Hainan Airlines Holdings Co., Ltd.

On March 19, 2021, the Clearing Group of HNA Group issued the "Announcement of Strategic Investor Recruitment of HNA Group's Aviation Main Industry" in order to submit intentions to qualified investors, and issued a supplementary announcement on the 30th to explain that the overall recruitment of war investors in the main aviation industry, and each member airline does not recruit war investors separately. Hainan Aviation issued an announcement on September 12 that the liquidation team of HNA Group has determined that the strategic investor of HNA Group's main aviation business is Liaoning Fangda Group Industrial Co., Ltd.

On October 31, 2021, the Hainan High Court approved the Reorganization Plan for Substantial Merger and Reorganization of 321 Companies including HNA Group Co., Ltd. and the Reorganization Plan of Hainan Airlines Holdings Co., Ltd. and its Ten Subsidiaries. HNA Aviation Group Co., Ltd. completed the industrial and commercial change procedures on January 20, 2022. 95% of the company's equity was registered under the name of Hainan Fangda Aviation Development Co., Ltd., and the remaining 5% was held by Hainan Hainan Airlines No. 2 Information Management Service Co., Ltd.

== Subsidiary ==
=== Airlines ===
As of December 31, 2023, the following members are wholly owned or directly controlled by the group:

- Grand China Air (GN/GDC)
- Capital Airlines (JD/CBJ)
- Suparna Airlines (Y8/YZR)
- West Air (PN/CHB)
- Tianjin Air Cargo (HT/CTJ)

The following members are jointly operated by the group or controlled by the group's subsidiaries.

- Hainan Airlines (HU/CHH)
- China Xinhua Airlines (XW/CXH)
- Tianjin Airlines (GS/GCR)
- Lucky Air (8L/LKE) (87%) Yunnan Province (13%)
- Urumqi Air (UQ/CUH)
- Fuzhou Airlines (FU/FZA)
- GX Airlines (GX/CBG) (70%) Guangxi Province (30%)
- Shan Xi Airlines (8C/CXI) (73%)
- Air Chang'an (9H/CGN) (71%) Shaanxi Province (12%)
- Hong Kong Airlines (HX/CRK)
- Hong Kong Air Cargo (RH/HKC)

=== Aviation maintenance and repair (MRO) ===
- HNA Technic
- Lufthansa HNA Technical Training Co., Ltd.
- SR Technics

=== Charter and general aviation ===
- Deer Jet
- Beijing Capital Helicopter
- Hainan Airlines Training

=== Travel services ===
- Hainan HNA Aviation sales Co., Ltd.

== Fleet ==
=== Current fleet ===
As of January 15, 2025, the fleet of HNA Aviation consists of 635 aircraft:

Long-haul:

- 64 Airbus A330 family aircraft.
- 63 Boeing 787 family aircraft.
- 2 Boeing 747 family aircraft.

Medium/Short-haul:

- 252 Boeing 737 family aircraft.
- 236 Airbus A320 family aircraft.
- 63 Embraer E-Jet family aircraft.

It is the fourth biggest fleet in order of aviation groups after China Southern Airlines Holdings, Air China Group and China Eastern Airlines Group.

Aircraft	Picture	In service		orders	Cabin			Operator	Notes	Source
Aircraft	Picture	In service		orders	J	W	Y	Operator	Notes	Source
Airbus A319-100		16	2	—	VIP			DF	ACJ	
Airbus A319-100		16	6	—	4	—	132	JD, PN		
Airbus A319-100		16	1	—	—	—	138	JD		
Airbus A319-100		16	7	—	—	—	144	JD, PN		
Airbus A319neo		2	1	—	VIP			DF		
Airbus A319neo		2	1	—	—	—	144	PN		
Airbus A320-200		120	1	—	VIP			DF	ACJ	
Airbus A320-200		120	5	—	8		144	HX, JD		
Airbus A320-200		120	4	—	8		150	JD, GS		
Airbus A320-200		120	52	—	—	—	174	HX, JD, GS, GX, 8L		
Airbus A320-200		120	1	—	—	—	177	GX	ex-CZ	
Airbus A320-200		120	46	—	—	—	180	HX, JD, GS, GX, 8L, PN		
Airbus A320-200		120	14	—	—	—	186	GS, 8L, PN		
Airbus A320neo		48	3	—	8	—	156	HU		
Airbus A320neo		48	2	—	8	—	168	GX		
Airbus A320neo		48	4	—	4	—	168	HU		
Airbus A320neo		48	5	—	—	—	174	GS		
Airbus A320neo		48	7	—	—	—	180	JD		
Airbus A320neo		48	27	—	—	—	186	GS, 8L, PN		
Airbus A321-200		24	1	—	8	—	200	PN	ex-Avianca	
Airbus A321-200		24	8	—	—	—	212	JD		
Airbus A321-200		24	11	—	—	—	220	HX, JD		
Airbus A321-200		24	4	—	—	—	230	GS, PN		
Airbus A321neo		7	3	—	8	—	190	JD	CFMI engines	
Airbus A321neo		7	4	—	8	—	199	PN	PW engines, ex-QW	
Airbus A330-200		21	3	—	36	—	178	HU		
Airbus A330-200		21	2	—	36	—	186	JD	ex-Garuda Indonesia	
Airbus A330-200		21	1	—	18	—	246	JD		
Airbus A330-200		21	10	—	18	—	242	HU, GS, JD		
Airbus A330-200		21	5	—	Cargo			HX	A330-200F	
Airbus A330-300		40	17	—	32	—	260	HU, HX		
Airbus A330-300		40	1	—	30	—	255	HX	ex-SQ	
Airbus A330-300		40	21	—	24	—	279	HU, HX, JD, 8L		
Airbus A330-300		40	2	—	18	—	288	JD		
Airbus A330-900		—		20	TBA			HU	TBD 2025	
Boeing 737-700		10	3	—	8	—	120	8L	ex-HU	
Boeing 737-700		10	3	—	—	—	138	8L		
Boeing 737-700		10	3	—	—	—	145	8L		
Boeing 737-700		10	1	—	Cargo			HT	BDSF	
Boeing 737-800		219	1	—	8	—	144	Y8		
Boeing 737-800		219	16	—	8	—	150	HU		
Boeing 737-800		219	15	—	8	—	156	HU, FU, CN		
Boeing 737-800		219	102	—	8	—	162	HU, 8C, UQ		
Boeing 737-800		219	4	—	—	—	179	HU, XW	No winglet	
Boeing 737-800		219	2	—	—	—	183	9H		
Boeing 737-800		219	27	—	—	—	186	HU, FU, 8L, Y8, 9H, UQ		
Boeing 737-800		219	46	—	—	—	189	HU, FU, 8L, 9H, UQ		
Boeing 737-800		219	5	—	Cargo			HT	BCF	
Boeing 737-800		219	1	—	Cargo			HT	SF	
Boeing 737-8		23	11	—	8	—	168	HU		
Boeing 737-8		23	12	—	—	—	189	HU, FU, 8L		
Boeing 747-400		1	1	—	Cargo			Y8	BDSF	
Boeing 747-400		1	1	—	Cargo			Y8	ERF	
Boeing 777F		—		2	Cargo			Y8		
Boeing 787-8		10		—	36	—	177	HU	GEnx engines	
Boeing 787-9		28	3	—	26	21	247	HU	GEnx engines	
Boeing 787-9		28	10	—	30	—	259	HU	GEnx engines	
Boeing 787-9		28	15	—	30	—	262	HU	GEnx engines	
Comac C909		—		40	TBA			UQ		
Comac C919		—		60	TBA			Y8	STD version	
Embraer 190		46	2	—	6	—	92	GS	LR version	
Embraer 190		46	44	—	—	—	106	GS, GX	LR version	
Embraer 195		17		—	—	—	122	GS	LR version	

=== Historical fleet ===
Aircraft	Number		Cabin			Operator	Notes	Source
Aircraft	Number		F	C	Y	Operator	Notes	Source
Airbus A340-600	3		8	60	220	HU	ex-CX	
Airbus A350-900	15	13	—	33	301	HU, HX		
Airbus A350-900	15	2	—	30	309	HU	ex-JJ	
Boeing 737-300	23	6						
Boeing 737-300	23	13	Cargo				SF	
Boeing 737-300	23	4	Cargo				QC	
Boeing 737-400	11	8	—	8	138			
Boeing 737-400	11	3	Cargo				SF	
Boeing 767-300ER	5	3	—	34	199	HU		
Boeing 767-300ER	5	2	—	—	—	HU	ex-Q7	
De Havilland Canada DHC-8-400	3		—	—	78			
Donier Do-328	29	12	—	—	32	HU	-300	
Donier Do-328	29	17	—	—	32	HU	-310	
Embraer ERJ-145	25		—	—	50	GS	LI	

== See also ==
- Civil aviation in China
- Liaoning Fangda Group Industrial
- HNA Group (defunct)
- Hainan Airlines
- Grand China Air
