= Tianjin Air Cargo =

Chinese cargo airline

Tianjin Air Cargo 天津货运航空
IATA	ICAO	Call sign
HT	CTJ	TIANJIN CARGO
- Founded: April 2016; 10 years ago
- Commenced operations: 11 September 2018; 8 years ago
- Hubs: Tianjin Binhai International Airport
- Fleet size: 7
- Destinations: 4
- Parent company: HNA Aviation (44.28%)
- Headquarters: Tianjin, China

Tianjin Air Cargo Co., Ltd., operating as Tianjin Air Cargo (formerly Sky Cargo Air and Tianjin Cargo Airlines), is a cargo airline in China founded by HNA Group and Tianjin Port Free Trade Zone. The airline received an air operator's certificate (AOC) from the Civil Aviation Administration of China in mid-2018, with services commencing in September that year. It operates out of Tianjin Binhai International Airport with a fleet of Boeing 737 freighters, with plans to expand its fleet size to between 50 and 100 aircraft and launch intercontinental freighter routes in the future.

== Destinations ==
Tianjin Air Cargo serves seven destinations in four countries.

=== Bangladesh ===
- Dhaka – Shahjalal International Airport

=== China ===
- Nanning – Nanning Wuxu International Airport
- Sanya – Sanya Phoenix International Airport
- Tianjin – Tianjin Binhai International Airport
- Weihai – Weihai Dashuibo Airport
- Xi'an – Xi'an Xianyang International Airport

=== Singapore ===
- Singapore – Changi Airport

=== South Korea ===
- Seoul – Incheon International Airport

=== Vietnam ===
- Ho Chi Minh City - Tan Son Nhat International Airport
- Hanoi - Noi Bai International Airport

=== Philippines ===
- Davao - Francisco Bangoy International Airport
- Manila - Ninoy Aquino International Airport

== Fleet ==
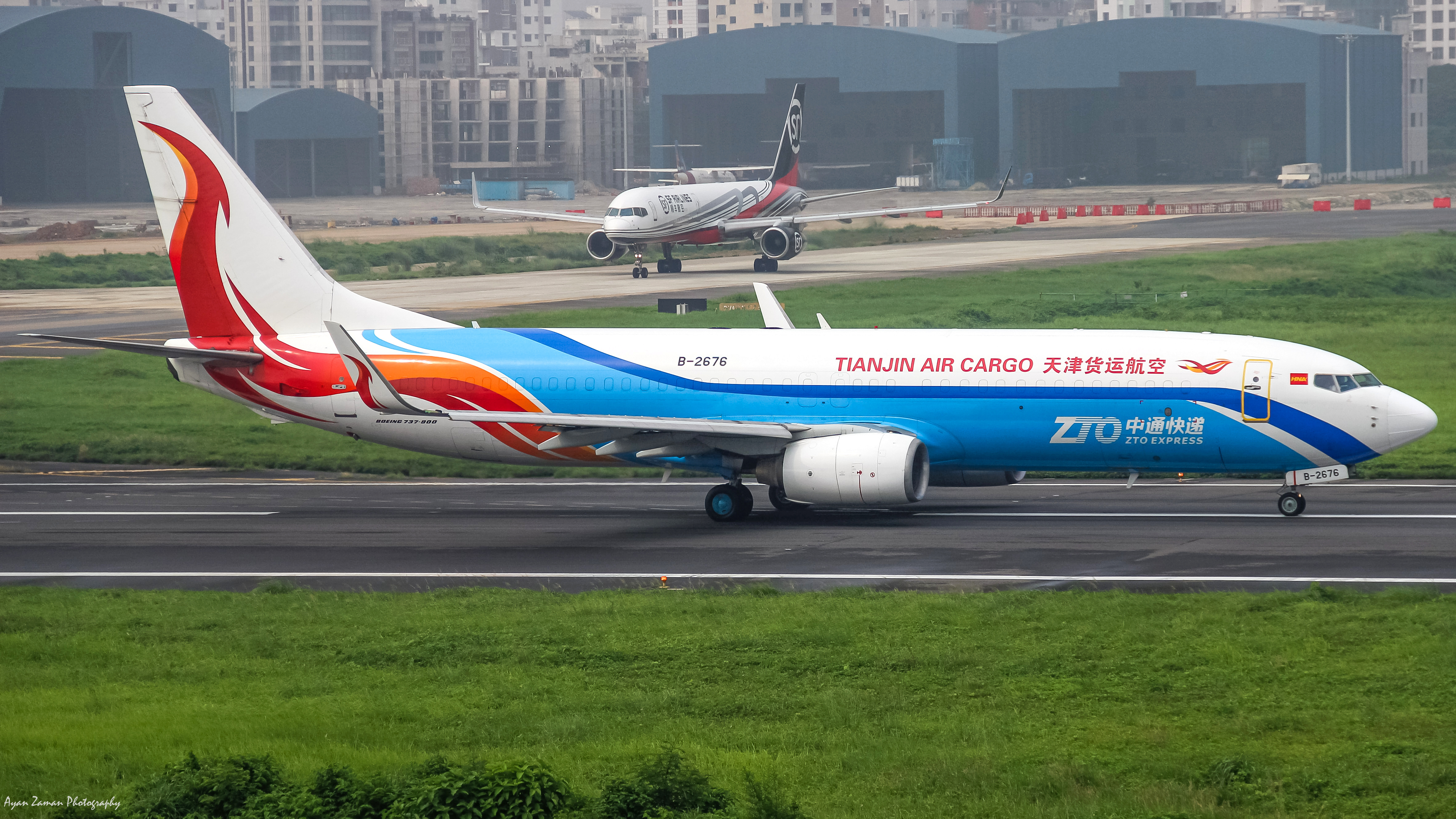
Tianjin Air Cargo Boeing 737-800BCF

In March 2018, Suparna Airlines which owns a 12.86% stake in Tianjin Air Cargo, sold two Boeing 737-400BCFs to the latter, allowing commercial services to begin.

As of August 2025, Tianjin Air Cargo operates the following aircraft:

Aircraft	In service	Orders	Passengers	Notes
Boeing 737-700BDSF	1	—	Cargo	
Boeing 737-800BCF	5	—	Cargo	
Boeing 737-800SF	1	—	Cargo	
Total	7	—		

Tianjin Air Cargo previously operated: 1 Boeing 737-300SF and 2 Boeing 737-400BCF
