= YZR =

YZR may refer to:

- Sarnia Chris Hadfield Airport, Ontario, Canada, IATA Code YZR
- Suparna Airlines, formerly Yangtze River Express, a Chinese cargo airline, ICAO airline code YZR
