= RWTH International Academy =

RWTH International Academy gGmbH is RWTH Aachen University’s official academy for continuing education. It was founded in the year 2000 and is a subsidiary of the RWTH Aachen University.

== History ==
The RWTH International Academy was first founded as the Aachen Global Academy in 1999 as a GmbH by RWTH Aachen University and the Freunden und Förderern der RWTH Aachen e.V. (proRWTH) - a foundation of alumni and donors of RWTH Aachen University. In 2006 the institution was renamed as RWTH International Academy gGmbH. RWTH Aachen University and proRWTH each own half of the now non-profit entity or gGmbH.

== Structure ==
The RWTH International Academy consists of a scientific advisory board made up of the deans of the faculties of RWTH Aachen University. Atop the organizational structure are two directors - an academic director and a managing director. The organization is divided into 6 business units:

- Engineering & Natural Sciences
- Medicine & Health
- Development, Accreditation & Quality Assurance
- Conference Office
- Corporate Services

== Educational services ==
As the RWTH International Academy is not a university as such, its different educational formats are always offered in cooperation with RWTH Aachen University proper. Rather, the International Academy is a service provider working together with the university as well as the Maastricht School of Management and a number of other partner institutions. As of 2018 they offer courses in the following formats:

- Summer and winter schools
- Master's programs (M.Sc.)
- Certificate courses for professionals
- Preparatory courses
- Career Service

The International Academy offers programs in the academic disciplines of mechanical engineering, civil engineering, laboratory sciences, and management studies.

== RWTH Business School ==
Although the RWTH International Academy started offering business programs as early as 2001, due to the high number of students, in 2016 the Academy founded the RWTH Business School under the auspices of the RWTH Aachen University School of Business and Economics. Initially, the Business School was an integral part of the nonprofit RWTH International Academy gGmbH, however in late 2017 the Business School was spun off and became the for-profit RWTH Aachen Business School GmbH. By changing its legal form as of January 1, 2021, RWTH Aachen Business School GmbH has been transformed into a non-profit limited liability company: RWTH Aachen Business School gGmbH.

Today, RWTH Business School offers different types of further education programs at the intersection of management and technology together with the School of Business and Economics of RWTH Aachen University:

- MBA programs
- MSc programs
- Customized inhouse programs
- Topic-specific open programs

== See also ==
- RWTH Aachen University
