= PC/SC =

Specification for smart-card integration into computers

PC/SC (short for "Personal Computer/Smart Card") is a specification for smart-card integration into computing environments.

Microsoft has implemented PC/SC in Microsoft Windows 200x/XP and makes it available under Microsoft Windows NT/9x. A free implementation of PC/SC, PC/SC Lite, is available for Linux and other Unixes; a forked version comes bundled with Mac OS X.

== Work group ==
=== Core members ===
- Gemalto
- Infineon
- Microsoft
- Toshiba

=== Associate members ===
Advanced Card Systems • Alcor Micro • Athena Smartcard Solutions • Bloombase • C3PO S.L. • Cherry Electrical Products • Cross S&T Inc. • Dai Nippon Printing Co., Ltd. • Feitian Technologies • Kobil Systems GmbH • Silitek • Nidec Sankyo Corporation • O2Micro, Inc. • OMNIKEY (HID Global) • Precise Biometrics • Realtek Semiconductor Corp. • Research In Motion • Sagem Orga • SCM Microsystems • Siemens • Teridian Semiconductor Corp.

== See also ==
- CT-API, an alternative API
