= Fuzhou Airlines =

Chinese airline

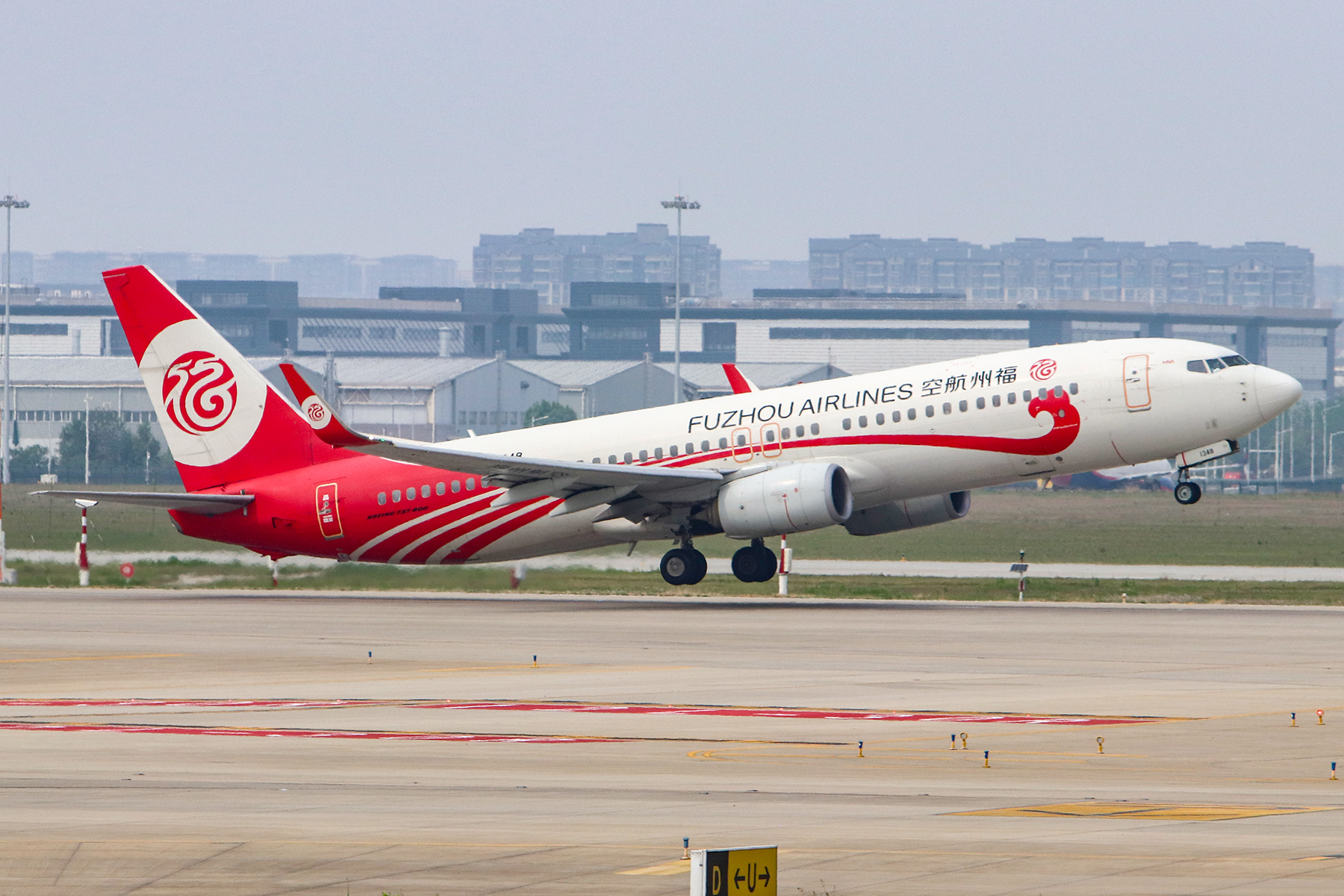
IATA	ICAO	Call sign
FU	FZA	STRAIT AIR
- Commenced operations: 30 October 2014; 11 years ago
- Operating bases: Fuzhou Changle International Airport; Harbin Taiping International Airport
- Fleet size: 17
- Parent company: HNA Aviation
- Headquarters: Fuzhou Changle International Airport, Fuzhou, China
- Website: www.fuzhou-air.cn

Fuzhou Airlines
- Simplified Chinese: 福州航空
Transcriptions
Standard Mandarin
- Hanyu Pinyin: Fúzhōu Hángkōng

Fuzhou Airlines is an airline headquartered at Fuzhou Changle International Airport, Fuzhou, Fujian province, China. It is a subsidiary of Hainan Airlines.

== History ==
The airline was formed as a joint venture subsidiary of HNA Group and Fuzhou Municipal Government. As part of its initial operation, Fuzhou Airlines' professional personnel (including pilots, MRO staff and cabin crew) were provided by its parent company Hainan Airlines.

On 17 October 2014, the carrier secured its Air Operators Certificate (AOC) from the Civil Aviation Administration of China (CAAC). This certificate was needed to allow the launch later that month. Operations started on 30 October 2014 with its maiden flight serving the Fuzhou–Beijing sector.

== Ownership ==
As of October 2014, Fuzhou Airlines has a registered capital of CNY2 billion ($33 million). The major shareholder of the company is the HNA Group (CNY1.2 billion, 60% stake), with the balance split between the Fuzhou State-owned Investment Holdings Co. keeping 20% of the shares and Century Golden Resources Group and Ningbo Ruitong Network Technology Co. having 10% each.

== Destinations ==
Prior to the launch of services, the airline stated it had been approved to initially fly to seven domestic destinations from Fuzhou: Chongqing, Kunming, Haikou, Hefei, Taiyuan, Tianjin and Xi'an. All these routes, along with another one serving Shanghai-Pudong, commenced on 30 October 2014, when formal operations were launched. The carrier plans to expand in the future in order to serve over a dozen domestic routes.

== Fleet ==
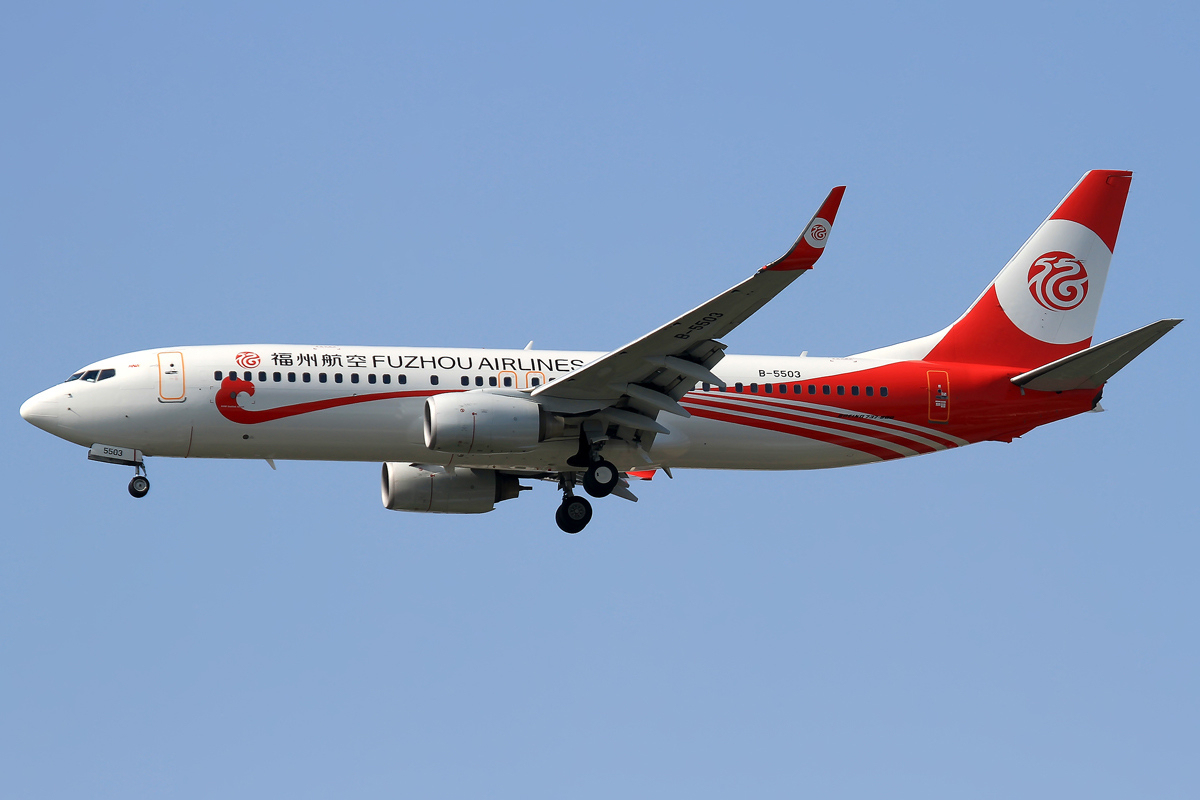
Fuzhou Airlines Boeing 737-800

As of August 2025, Fuzhou Airlines operates the following aircraft:

Fuzhou Airlines fleet
Aircraft	In Service	Orders	Passengers			Notes
Aircraft	In Service	Orders	J	Y	Total	Notes
Boeing 737-800	14	—	8	156	164	
Boeing 737 MAX 8	2	—	Unknown			
Total	16	—				

The company took delivery of its first aircraft, a Boeing 737-800 sourced from Hainan Airlines that was repainted in a red and white livery, in early October 2014. Fuzhou Airlines started operations with a fleet of two of these aircraft using a seating layout able to accommodate 8 passengers in Business and 156 in Economy class. There are plans to expand the number of aircraft in the fleet to 40 by 2020.

== See also ==
- Air transport in China
