= Wang Jian (businessman) =

Chinese billionaire businessman and executive

- Born: 1961; Tianjin, China
- Died: 3 July 2018 (aged 56–57); Bonnieux, Provence, France
- Cause of death: Allegedly accidental fall
- Education: Civil Aviation University of China, Maastricht School of Management
- Occupation: Business executive
- Known for: Co-founder and co-chairman of Hainan Airlines and HNA Group
- Relatives: Wang Wei (brother)

Chinese name
- Chinese: 王健
Transcriptions
Standard Mandarin
- Hanyu Pinyin: Wáng Jiàn
- Wade–Giles: Wang Chien
- IPA: [wǎŋ tɕjɛ̂n]

Wang Jian (Chinese: 王健; 1961 – 3 July 2018) was a Chinese entrepreneur and billionaire. Together with Chen Feng, he was co-founder and co-chairman of Hainan Airlines and the conglomerate HNA Group, with assets worth US$230 billion as of 2018.

Wang died after a fall while traveling in Bonnieux, France, in July 2018. Despite widespread speculation and conspiracy theories, French police concluded that the death was accidental.

== Biography ==
Wang was born in Tianjin in 1961. He graduated from Civil Aviation University of China in 1983 with a bachelor's degree in aviation business management, and worked for the Civil Aviation Administration of China afterwards. He later received training at Japan Airlines on a scholarship from the Association for Overseas Technical Scholarship (AOTS), and earned an MBA from the Maastricht School of Management in the Netherlands in 1995.

In 1990, Wang participated in the establishment of Hainan Airlines, based in Hainan province, and became the new company's chief executive. Together with partner Chen Feng, Wang also founded the conglomerate HNA Group, which grew to become the world's 170th largest company according to Fortune Global 500, with total revenue of US$53 billion in 2017.

Chen acted as the public face of the company, while Wang was a hands-on manager with a lower public profile. Both men were instrumental in HNA's phenomenal transformation from a small airline to a global conglomerate with assets worth US$230 billion, including major stakes in Hilton Hotels & Resorts, Deutsche Bank, NH Hotel Group, and ownership of Ingram Micro. However, HNA's acquisition spree was substantially funded by debt, which had reached US$90 billion in 2018, and it was working to sell billions of dollars of assets to reduce its debt load at the time of Wang's accidental death.

Wang and Chen were the largest individual shareholders of HNA, with each owning about 15% of the company as of 2017, making them two of the richest people in China. In addition to his responsibilities at HNA, Wang also taught as a part-time professor at his alma mater, Civil Aviation University of China.

== Family ==
Wang had a younger brother, Wang Wei, who has played a key behind-the-scenes role at HNA Group.

== Death ==
In July 2018, Wang made a business trip in France. On 3 July, he took a sightseeing detour with his colleagues in Bonnieux, a hilltop village in the region of Provence. He climbed onto a low wall above a cliff to have his picture taken, but lost his balance and fell backward, landing on rocks about 15 metres (49 ft) below. He was pronounced dead a few hours later.

In January 2019, the French newspaper Libération published an investigative report citing eyewitness accounts that contradicted the findings of the police investigation. One witness, a local street cleaner, claimed that Wang had jumped rather than fallen, suggesting a suicide. But French police denied these claims.

Wang's death was a blow to HNA, which was in the midst of selling its foreign assets to reduce its debt load, and the prices of the company's dollar bonds fell after his death was confirmed. Hainan Airlines along with other airlines from HNA Group changed its website to a gray color scheme to honour his death.
