= HNA Group =

Former Chinese conglomerate

HNA Group Co., Ltd.

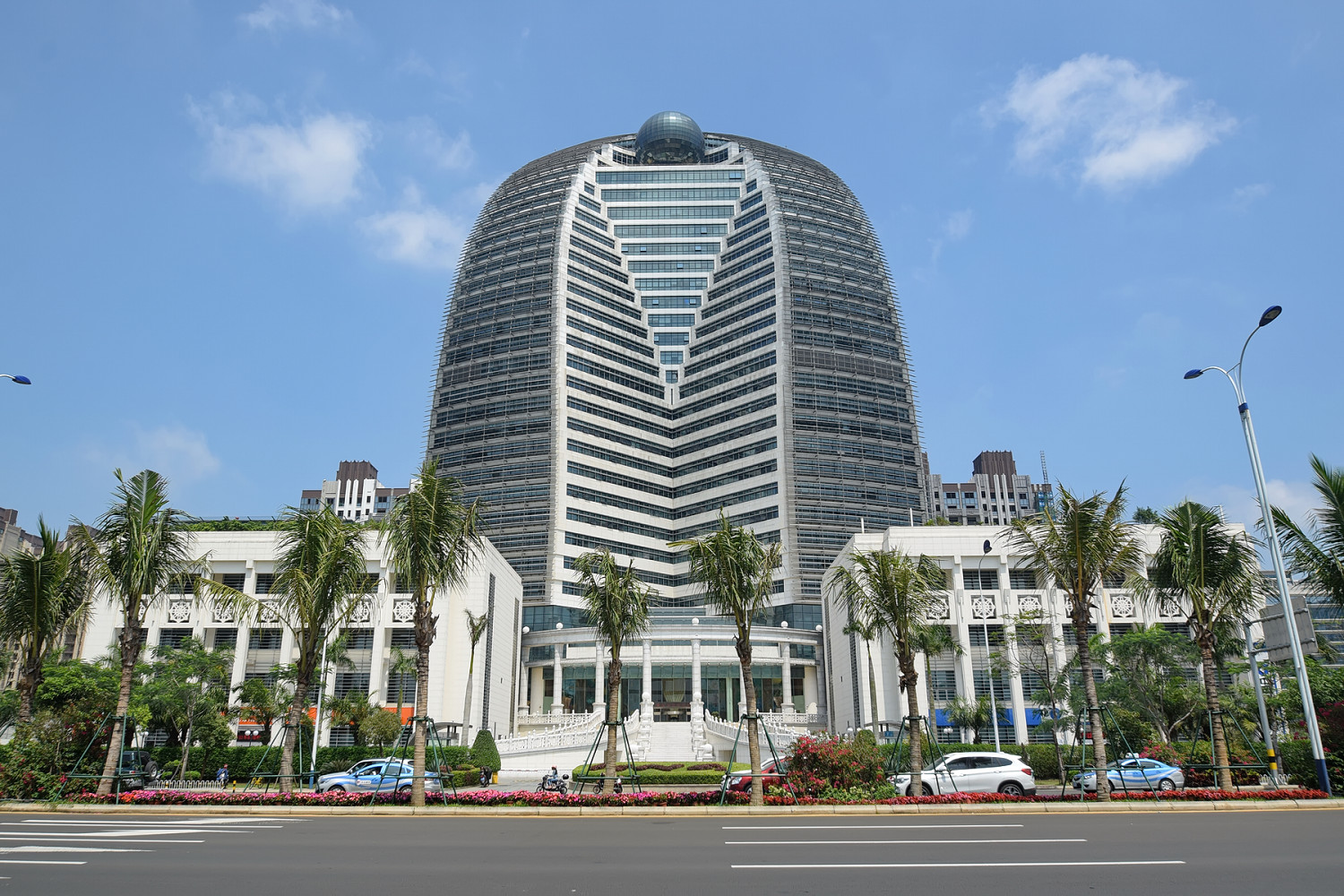
- HNA Building, Haikou, Hainan was headquarters of HNA Group
- Type: Private
- Industry: Aviation, tourism, financial services, real estate, logistics
- Founded: April 16, 1998; 28 years ago
- Founders: Chen Feng, Wang Jian, Tan Xiangdong, and others
- Defunct: December 8, 2021; 4 years ago
- Fate: Bankrupted List: The aviation division acquired by Liaoning Fangda Group Industrial.; The airport division acquired by Hainan Development Holdings Co., Ltd.
- Successors: HNA Aviation (owned by Liaoning Fangda Group Industrial); Hainan Airport Group (owned by Hainan Development Holdings Co., Ltd.)
- Headquarters: HNA Building, Haikou, China
- Key people: Chen Feng (chairman); Tan Xiangdong (Adam Tan, Vice-chairman & CEO); Zhang Ling (CEO); Gu Gang (Party secretary of HNA Group)
- Revenue: ▲CN¥100.941 billion (2015)
- Operating income: ▼CN¥2.366 billion (2015)
- Net income: ▲CN¥806 million (2015)
- Total assets: ▲CN¥468.709 billion (2015)
- Total equity: ▲CN¥22.514 billion (2015)
- Owner: Hainan Traffic Administration Holding (70%); Jianyun Investments (30%)
- Parent: Hainan Traffic Administration Holding (direct); Hainan Province Cihang Foundation (ultimate)
- Footnotes in a consolidated basis; equity and profit excluded minority interests; in Chinese Accounting Standards

HNA Group Co., Ltd.
- Simplified Chinese: 海航集团有限公司
- Traditional Chinese: 海航集團有限公司
Transcriptions

HNA Group
- Simplified Chinese: 海航集团
- Traditional Chinese: 海航集團
Transcriptions

HNA Group Co., Ltd., was a Chinese conglomerate headquartered in Haikou, Hainan, China. Founded in 2000, it was involved in numerous industries including aviation, real estate, financial services, tourism, logistics, and more. It was the owner of Hainan Airlines and a part owner of Grand China Air. In July 2017, HNA Group ranked No. 170 in 2017 Fortune Global 500 list with a revenue of $53.335 billion. It was one of the most active investment companies in the world, acquiring numerous assets under its name. In 2021, the corporation declared bankruptcy after debt restructuring efforts failed. On December 8, 2021, Liaoning Fangda Group Industrial acquired HNA's aviation division. Later, on December 24, Hainan Development Holdings Co., Ltd. acquired HNA's airport division, and marked the closing of the final chapter in the now defunct HNA Group.

== History ==
In 1993, Chen Feng, Wang Jian, Tan Xiangdong, among others, created Hainan Airlines, with approval by the Hainan Provincial Government. Following a restructuring of the airline in 1997, they founded HNA Group Co. Ltd. in January 2000. After this, the Group underwent great diversification, entering multiple industries such as tourism and logistics. It also significantly expanded its involvement with both national and international companies. These included several airlines, NH Hotel Group, Uber, and an office tower and a hotel in New York City. HNA Group had spent more than US$3 billion on foreign acquisitions. It had intended to be one of the top 50 companies in the world by 2030.

In October 2005, Soros Quantum Fund invested $25 million stake in HNA Group.

On February 18, 2016, HNA reached an agreement to acquire Ingram Micro Inc, a California-based technology distributor, for $6 billion, in the largest Chinese takeover of a US information technology company. HNA Group was then advised by China International Capital Corporation in the transaction.

In July 2017, HNA was targeted by the Central Government in a set of new measures that prohibit state-owned banks from lending money to Chinese private companies to curb their foreign investment activities and also over concerns about HNA's debt levels. Several banks associated with HNA's foreign investments halted new loans since, though some had already suspended their grants before the measures were signed into effect.

A year after investing, HNA Group was in talks to sell some or all of its 25% share in Hilton Grand Vacations, a timeshare business which had spun off from Hilton Worldwide Holdings the year before.

Overall debt in 2017 is said to have reached $94 billion at a borrowing cost of $5 billion for the full year. To ease the burden, the company disposed of assets worth $13 billion. The liquidity shortage also led the non-delivery of up to six Airbus A330 aircraft to be delivered to the group.

On 29 January 2021, HNA Group declared bankruptcy after debt restructuring efforts failed. The Hainan High Court criticized the company's corporate governance structure regarding management of its affiliates in the ruling. Hainan Airlines confirmed that it was operating as normal. Creditors were demanding the equivalent of US$187 billion in liabilities from the company. It is expected for the restructuring to take one year to complete. As part of the restructuring, most of the shares of HNA Group will be transferred to its creditors. In September 2021, founder and chairman Chen Feng and CEO Tan Xiangdong were arrested, while Chen's son Xiaofeng remained on HNA's board. The failed to restructuring makes HNA Group forced to split its assets and acquired by different buyers. In December 2021, HNA's aviation including its founding and flagship brand Hainan Airlines, was sold to Liaoning Fangda Group Industrial.

== Employment numbers ==
In 2017 the total number of employees in the Group was over 410,000 and the number of overseas employees was nearly 290,000.

== Entities ==
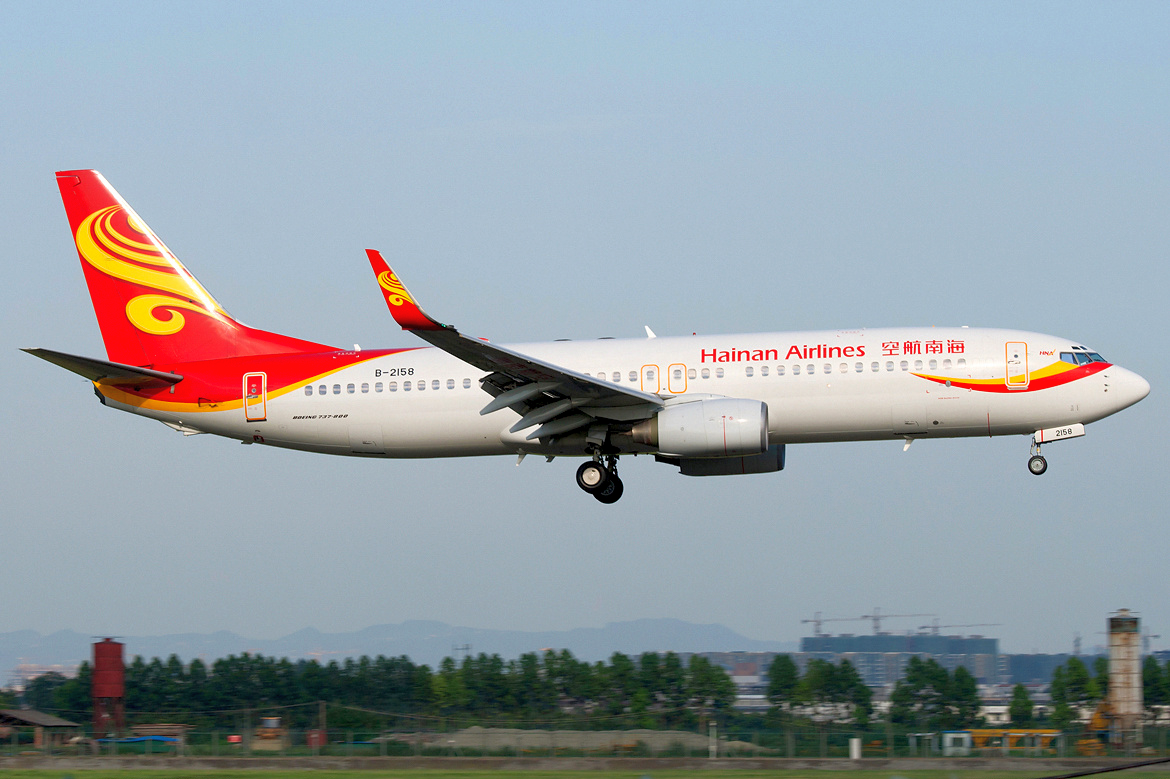
HNA Aviation has a stake in Hainan Airlines via Grand China Air

HNA Group was composed of seven sub-groups: HNA Aviation, HNA Tourism, HNA Capital, HNA Holdings, HNA Modern Logistics, HNA Innovation Finance, and HNA Innovation Media & Entertainment.

=== HNA Aviation ===
In December 2021, HNA Aviation was sold to Liaoning Fangda Group Industrial.

HNA Aviation is affiliated with multiple Chinese airlines. These include the following:

- Air Chang'an
- Beijing Capital Airlines
- Fuzhou Airlines
- Grand China Air
- GX Airlines
- Hainan Airlines
- Lucky Air
- Suparna Airlines
- Tianjin Airlines
- Urumqi Air
- West Air

The group also has stakes in some carriers based outside mainland China, including Hong Kong Airlines as well as Africa World Airlines, Azul Brazilian Airlines (23.7%), MyCargo Airlines, TAP Air Portugal (2.5%) and had a stake in Virgin Australia (13%).

On 18 January 2016, HNA Aviation formed the world's first alliance of low-cost carriers, U-FLY Alliance. While the founding members of the alliance—HK Express, Lucky Air, Urumqi Air, and West Air—are all affiliated with HNA Aviation, the alliance is also open to airlines not within HNA Group.

On 27 March 2019, HNA Aviation sold full stake of HK Express to Cathay Pacific for HK$4.93 billion. The transaction was expected to be completed by 31 December 2019, and by that time HK Express would become Cathay Pacific's wholly owned subsidiary.

=== Other entities ===
HNA Tourism is involved in the tourism industry. Subgroup HNA Hospitality Group operates several resorts, business hotels, boutique hotels, and the Tangla hotel chain.

In 2015, the HNA Group purchased a failing hotel in Kerhonkson, New York, in upstate New York. The Hudson Valley Resort & Spa was featured on an October 2017 Planet Money podcast exploring why a Chinese multinational company would invest in a remote hotel in the United States.

HNA Capital deals with financial services and investment banking. It has over 30 member companies, such as Bohai Trust.

HNA Holdings is involved in real estate and the retailing industry. Subgroup HNA Airport Group operates 16 airports across China, including the airports in Haikou, Sanya, Weifang, Dongying, Yichang, Anqing, and Yingkou.

HNA Logistics is engaged with shipbuilding, marine cargo transport, air cargo, and other elements of logistics.

HNA Innovation Finance is headquartered in Hong Kong; its main business covers bulk commodity trading, financial investment and consumer finance products and services.

HNA Innovation Media and Entertainment.

=== Subsidiaries ===
- HNA Industrial Group
  - HNA Infrastructure Holding Group
    - HNA Infrastructure Investment Group
- HNA Aviation (100%)
  - HNA Aviation (Hong Kong) Holdings (100%)
    - HNA Aviation (Hong Kong) Air Catering Holding (100%)
      - gategroup
- HNA Innovation Finance Group
- Advanced Card Systems Holdings (SEHK: 2086)

== Leadership ==
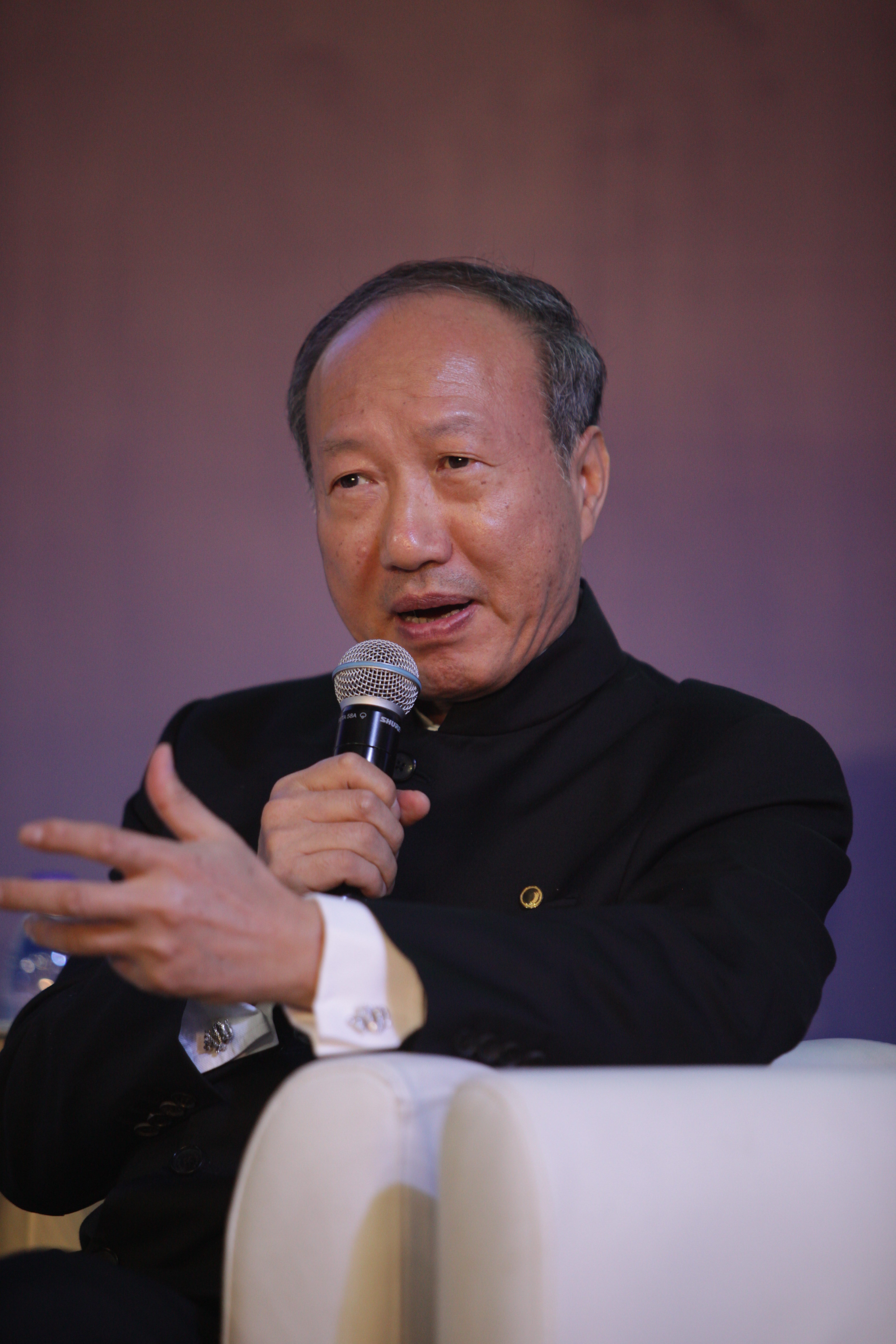
Chen Feng, HNA Chairman

- Chen Feng (co-founder and chairman of the board)
- Wang Jian (co-founder and chairman of the board), died on 3 July 2018 in an accident
- Tan Xiangdong or Adam Tan (co-founder and vice-chairman of the board and CEO)
- Li Xianhua (co-founder and vice-chairman of the board)
- Lu Ying (vice-chairman of the board)
- Chen Wenli (co-founder and member of the board of directors)
- Zhang Ling (member of the board of directors and CEO)
- Chen Xiaofeng (member of the board), son of Chen Feng

== Investments and acquisitions ==
=== Equity investments ===
As of 31 December 2019

- Grand China Air (23.11%) as second largest shareholder
- Haikou Meilan International Airport
- Hainan Airlines (4.88% directly; additional 4.25% via subsidiary Changjiang Leasing) as second largest shareholder; Grand China Air is the largest shareholder of Hainan Airlines.
- HNA Infrastructure
- AID Partners Capital Holdings (via HNA Group Holding and subscription of convertible bond).
- HNA Technology (20.76% via HNA Technology Group)
  - Ingram Micro (100%), it was divested in 2020 for US$7.2 billion.
- Deutsche Bank (previously 9.90% as the largest shareholder as of April 2017, jointly owned by subsidiaries BL Capital Holdings and HNA Innovation Finance Group via C-QUADRAT Special Situations Dedicated Fund; stake reduced to 8.8% as of February 16, 2018 and further reduced to 6.3% as of February 16, 2019)
- NH Hotel Group (29.34% as of 27 February 2017)

=== Acquisitions ===
- In 2006, the HNA Group acquired two airlines in Hong Kong, Hong Kong Airlines and Hong Kong Express Airways.
- In 2011, the HNA Group paid US$260 million for a foreclosure-threatened Manhattan office tower at 1180 Sixth Avenue and purchased the Cassa Hotel New York for US$126 million.
- In May 2011, the HNA Group purchased a 20% interest in the NH Hotel Group for €431.6 million (US$610.7 million) and in November 2014, HNA increased its ownership to 29.5%.
- In August 2011, the HNA Group purchased GE Seaco via its Bohai Leasing affiliate for US$1.05 billion, the world's 5th largest marine container leasing company.
- In October 2012, the HNA Group completed its acquisition of a 48 percent stake in Aigle Azur, France's second largest airline, for €52 million.
- In June 2013, the HNA Group purchased TIP Trailer Services, Europe's largest truck and trailer leasing company (with 45,000 units), from G.E. Capital.

==== 2015 ====
- In January 2015, affiliate Bohai Leasing purchased the Bermuda-based container leasing group, Cronos Limited, for €2.18 billion.
- In June 2015, HNA purchased a 6.2% interest in the South African airline, Comair.
- In June 2015, HNA Group bought a 15 percent stake in Red Lion Hotels Corporation from Columbia Pacific Advisors.
- In July 2015, HNA Group purchased airport ground handler Swissport International Ltd. from PAI Partners SAS for 2.73 billion Swiss francs (US$2.8 billion).
- In November 2015, the HNA Group announced it would invest US$450 million in low-cost carrier Azul Brazilian Airlines, becoming its single largest shareholder, with a 23.7% interest.
- In November 2015, HNA Group announced it would make a 10% investment in French hotelier Pierre & Vacances.
- In late 2015, HNA Group acquired the US-based start-up travel portal Travana with an investment of US$27.5 million.

==== 2016 ====
- In January 2016, the HNA Group via its Bohai Leasing affiliate, purchased Irish aircraft leasing company Avolon. When combined with HNA's existing aircraft leasing business, the new entity with over 500 aircraft will become the world's fourth largest aircraft leasing business by asset value.
- In February 2016, the HNA Group agreed to purchase technology distributor, Ingram Micro for $6.0 billion, via its controlled affiliate, Tianjin Tianhai Investment Co Ltd.
- In April 2016, the HNA Group purchased the London-based, ICE - International Currency Exchange.
- In April 2016, the HNA Group purchased US$38B in sales Minneapolis-based Carlson Rezidor Hotel Group (owner of the Radisson brand) which included a majority interest in US$7 billion in sales Rezidor Hotel Group of Brussels.
- In April 2016, the HNA Group purchased gategroup, the 2nd largest airline-catering company in the world, for $1.5 billion.
- In May 2016, the HNA Group purchased 49.99% of Air France's catering and cleaning subsidiary, Servair, with the option to increase its stake to 80% if certain conditions are met. When combined with previously purchased Gategroup, HNA will own and operate the world's largest airline catering company.
- In May 2016, the HNA Group purchased a 13% interest in Virgin Australia Holdings with the option to increase its stake to 20%.
- In May 2016, the HNA Group purchased a 7% interest in private consortium Atlantic Gateway, the owner of 50% of TAP Airlines, as well as convertible shares, which if exercised, would increase its stake in Atlantic to 40% and its indirect ownership of TAP to 20%.
- In July 2016, the HNA Group purchased an 80% stake in the Zurich-based aircraft maintenance organization SR Technics from Abu Dhabi's state investment company Mubadala.
- In October 2016, the HNA Group announced that it would purchase 25 percent of Hilton Worldwide Holdings Inc. from the Blackstone Group LP for $6.5 billion.

==== 2017 ====
- In January 2017, HNA Group announced the purchase of asset finance firm UDC Finance, New Zealand's largest non-bank lender, for NZL $660 million (US$460 million) by its Tip Trailer Services affiliate in Europe. The sale was still pending as of October 2017 due to regulatory issues.
- In February 2017, HNA Group's HNA Capital arm purchased a 3.04% stake in Deutsche Bank. Their stake was soon after increased to 4.76% and then to 9.9% in May 2017, becoming their single largest shareholder.
- In March 2017, HNA Group announced that it would purchase an 82.5% equity interest in Frankfurt–Hahn Airport, a former US military airbase which is popular with budget and cargo carriers (though 120 km from Frankfurt). This is the HNA Group's first acquisition of a non-Chinese airport.
- In March 2017, HNA Property Group, an affiliate of HNA Group, announced that it would purchase 245 Park Avenue for $2.21 billion, one of the highest prices ever paid for a New York City skyscraper. HNA also announced that they would back Tishman Speyer in the construction of The Spiral, a $3.2 billion, Bjarke Ingels-designed, 65-story, 1,005-foot office tower in the Hudson Yards, Manhattan development.
- In March 2017, affiliates of the HNA Group purchased a 25 percent interest in Old Mutual's U.S. asset management business for US$446 million.
- In March 2017, affiliates of the HNA Group purchased an aggregate 400,000 square feet of land at the former site of the Kai Tak Airport in Hong Kong for US$1.135 billion. HNA plans to develop the land into a "world-class integrated residential complex."
- In April 2017, HNA Group affiliate, Avolon, completed the purchase of CIT Group's aircraft leasing business for US$10.38 billion making HNA the 3rd largest aircraft leasing company in the world with a fleet of 868 aircraft.
- In April 2017, affiliates of the HNA Group purchased from Odebrecht its 60% share in a consortium that owns 51% of Rio de Janeiro–Galeão International Airport - Brazil's second busiest airport - giving HNA a 31.6% ownership interest. The remaining shares are owned by Brazilian airport manager Empresa Brasileira de Infraestrutura Aeroportuária (Infraero) (49%) and Changi Airports International Pte Ltd (19.4%) of Singapore.
- In August 2017, HNA Group purchased a 16.2% stake in Swiss-based travel retailer Dufry from Temasek and the Singapore Investment Corp. HNA Groups stake was increased to 20.92%; the value of their interest was reported to be $1.4 billion.

== Divestments ==
- In March 2019, HNA agreed to sell its 69.54% interest in Hong Kong International Construction Management Group to the Blackstone Group for $894 million.

== Shareholders ==
The shares of HNA Group were owned by two companies directly: Hainan Jiaoguan Holding (Chinese: 海南交管控股; pinyin: Hǎinán jiāoguǎn kònggǔ; lit. 'Hainan Traffic Administration Holding') for 70% and Yangpu Jianyun Investments (Chinese: 洋浦建运投资) for 30%. Two companies originally were incorporated by Chinese state-owned enterprises, such as Haikou Meilan International Airport.

Hainan Traffic Administration Holding was 50% owned by Tang Dynasty Development (Yangpu) (Chinese: 盛唐发展(洋浦)), 25% by Yangpu Hengsheng Chuangye (Chinese: 洋浦恒升创业) and 18.21% by Yangpu Zhongxin Airlines Holding (Chinese: 洋浦中新航空实业) and 6.78% by Hainan Xinhuading Trading (Chinese: 海南炘华鼎贸易) as of March 2017.

Tang Dynasty Development (Yangpu) was 65% owned by Hainan Province Cihang Charity Foundation (Chinese: 海南省慈航公益基金会) and 35% by Hong Kong incorporated company Tang Dynasty Development (simplified Chinese: 盛唐发展; traditional Chinese: 盛唐發展).

Tang Dynasty Development was 98% owned by Caymans-incorporated Pan-American Aviation Holding and 2% owned by Hainan Airlines.

Pan-American Aviation Holding was 100% owned by Guan Jun as of 2016 (Chinese: 貫君; pinyin: Guàn Jūn, acquired from Bharat Bhisé in 2016).

Yangpu Hengsheng Chuangye was owned by HK incorporated company Headstreams Investment (simplified Chinese: 千江源投资; traditional Chinese: 千江源投資), which was 98% owned by Bharat Bhisé and 2% by R.J. Conrads in 2004. As in 2015 Bhisé still owned 98% of Headstreams Investment, while the 2% stake of Headstreams was owned by Caymans-incorporated HAC (RAC), Limited as in 2011. In 2016, Bhisé also transferred the stake of Headstreams to Jun Guan.

Yangpu Jianyun Investments and Yangpu Zhongxin Airlines Holding were owned by The Committee of Hainan Airlines Trade Union (Chinese: 海南航空股份有限公司工会委员会). However, all the stake owned by the union, were transferred in 2016. According to the record in the National Credit Information Publicity System, part of the stake (6.78%) of Hainan Traffic Administration Holding held by Zhongxin Airlines Holding was transferred to newly established company Xinhuading. While Jianyun Investments was now owned by HNA Group directors Chen Feng (Chinese: 陈峰, 35.05%), Wang Jian (Chinese: 王健, 35.05%), Chen Wenli (Chinese: 陈文理, 9.23%), Tan Xiangdong (Chinese: 谭向东, 6.89%), Li Jing (Chinese: 李箐, 6.89%) and Li Xianhua (Chinese: 李先华, 6.89%). For Zhongxin Airlines Holding, the owners also became the 6 shareholders of Jianyun Investments with the same ratio; for newly established Xinhuading, the shareholders were 4 more HNA Group directors Lu Ying (Chinese: 逯鹰), Zhang Ling (Chinese: 张岭) Huang Gan (Chinese: 黄玕) and Huang Qijun (Chinese: 黄琪珺).

After much speculation on his identity, Guan Jun, by-then the indirect second largest shareholder of HNA Group (who acquired the stake from Bharat Bhisé), donated the stake to a US-registered private foundation Hainan Cihang Charity Foundation, Inc. in 2017.

Reuters also interviewed Bharat Bhisé, who had served as a director of several subsidiaries of HNA Group, as well as a business partner in acquisition via Bhisé's owned Bravia Capital as well as a dealmaker, say he hold the shares of HNA Group indirectly, was “an 'accommodation' to the company and received no compensation for doing so”. HNA Group also sued in exile Chinese billionaire Guo Wengui for defamation in June 2017, which Guo was spreading the rumour on the identity of the true owner of the group.

In 2017, the Swiss Takeover Board ruled that HNA Group provided false information regarding Bhisé and Guan on the takeover of Gategroup. In September 2019, the Swiss Financial Market Supervisory Authority announced that it would lodge a criminal complaint against HNA Group for repeatedly filing false disclosures of its shareholding structure.

structure of HNA Group based on legal filings

6 directors of HNA Group	4 directors of HNA Group
Zhongxin Airlines Holding
Jianyun Investments

Hainan Province Cihang Foundation
Xinhuading Trading
Hainan Traffic Administration Holding
HNA Group

Hainan Cihang Charity Foundation, Inc.
Pan-American Aviation Holding
Tang Dynasty Development
Tang Dynasty (Yangpu)
Hainan Provincial People's Government
Hainan Development Holdings
Grand China Air
Hainan Airlines

HAC(RAC), Ltd.
Headstreams Investment
Hengsheng Chuangye
other shareholders
public shareholders
