= Tan Xiangdong =

Chinese-American businessman

- Education: Capital University of Economics and Business (BA); St. John's University (MBA)
- Occupation: businessman
- Employer: HNA Group
- Known for: CEO and co-founder of HNA Group

Tan Xiangdong, also known as Adam Tan, is a Chinese-American businessman who is a co-founder of Hainan Airlines and the CEO of HNA Group.

== Biography ==
Tan received his B.A. from the Capital University of Economics and Business in Beijing, his M.B.A. from St. John's University in New York City and an executive education diploma from Harvard Business School. He worked in the World Bank, where he met Chen Feng, who was asked by Hainan provincial government to set up an airline, and co-founded Hainan Airlines in the early 1990s.

He became a director of HNA Group in 2001, and served as vice chairman and president from 2013 to 2016. He became CEO of HNA Group in 2016 and currently served as vice chairman from 2016 to 2020. Tan was credited as the "principal architect" of the group's expansion, which led to 80 deals totaling more than $40 billion between early 2015 and October 2017, including investments in Deutsche Bank AG, the Hilton hotel chain and SkyBridge Capital.

According to Rupert Hoogewerf's 2019 Hurun Rich List, Tan was the 1507th richest person in China, with a net worth of RMB 2.5 billion, or $360 million.

Tan also served as chairman of HNA Capital and the aircraft leasing company Avolon until February 2021. Tan has served as a member of Columbia College's board of visitors and a director of Atlantic Council.

In September 2021, Tan and HNA group chairman Chen Feng were detained by the Chinese police for unspecified crimes.
