= Travana =

Defunct online travel agency

Travana Inc.
- Company type: Private company
- Industry: Travel industry, Tourism
- Founded: 2015
- Founder: Jason Chen
- Defunct: 2016
- Fate: Bankrupt and closed in 2016
- Headquarters: San Francisco, California, United States
- Key people: Jason Chen (CEO)
- Owner: HNA Group (90%)
- Number of employees: 100 (2016)
- Website: www.janbala.com

Travana Inc. was an online travel agency (OTA) co-founded in 2015 by Jason Chen, an American entrepreneur. The company was headquartered in San Francisco, California and used janbala.com as its online representation. About 90% of Travana's equity stake was owned by HNA Group, a Chinese conglomerate based in Haikou, Hainan, China. However, Travana suddenly closed amid controversies in 2016 after only 14 months of operation.

== History ==
Travana, Inc. was registered with the Airlines Reporting Corporation (ARC) and the International Association of Travel Agents Network (IATAN). It operated in San Francisco, Chicago, and Manila in the Philippines. In August 2016, Travana launched an online a travel agency called Janbala.com.

HNA, a Chinese conglomerate, approached Travana in early 2015. In November 2015, HNA committed US$50 million in funding in exchange for a 90% equity stake with a pending investment of $150 million in the new venture. As a result, Travana became a Chinese majority-controlled company, with American employees and an HNA representative from China. Within 10 months, Travana became a fully operational OTA with a notable presence in the industry. It hired over a hundred employees and contractors, launched a booking platform, connected with airlines serving U.S. Consumers, and entered into agreements with travel suppliers.

== Controversies ==
HNA invested in Travana in late November 2015. Just over a year later, the firm filed for bankruptcy amid several litigations, parts of HNA's broader struggles managing its US acquisition spree. Amidst widespread and damaging corruption allegations against HNA, its CEO Adam Tan instructed that the CEO Jason Chen be fired and Travana be restructured without board meeting or resolution. Numerous allegations of wrongdoings surrounding Travana against HNA are sited. HNA with its unusual ownership and a complex array of affiliates has a network of operations and interconnected deals with friends and family members of top executives, that were difficult to track. As a result, the company filed for bankruptcy and its former CEO, Chen accused HNA of sabotage. Travana's board, controlled by HNA, made counter arguments in their filings in court.

== Legal actions ==
Following the collapse of Travana in March 2017, a group of creditors filed for Chapter 7 Involuntary Bankruptcy in an effort to protect its valuable assets. Then, in July 2017, its minority stockholders filed a lawsuit against HNA, its Chairman Wang Jian, its CEO Adam Tan, and HNA-appointed board members at Travana. The lawsuit was filed for breach of fiduciary duty, breach of contract, fraud and other legal causes of actions.
