= International Currency Exchange =

British foreign currency exchange business

International Currency Exchange (ICE)
- Type: Private company
- Industry: Financial services
- Founded: 1973; 53 years ago
- Headquarters: London, W1, United Kingdom
- Products: Bureau de change, Foreign Exchange
- Owner: Lenlyn Group
- Number of employees: 3,000+ (2021)
- Website: iceamerica.com

International Currency Exchange, often known simply as ICE, was a British foreign currency exchange company, based in London that operated a number of bureau de change locations worldwide. The UK part of the company filed for administration in October 2021 as a result financial losses due to Covid-19 travel restrictions.

At its peak the company had 180 locations in 10 countries. After the bankruptcy of the UK operations the company continued on with operations outside the United Kingdom including the United States and Ireland.

== History ==
The company was founded in 1973, when it opened its first site in London's Victoria station. It would go on to open locations across the country and worldwide.

ICE was the first foreign exchange operator to offer a pre-paid currency card and also to offer a voucher system, whereby customers are able to get discounted exchange rates by visiting the company's website before picking up their currency.

As one of the largest retail currency exchange operators in the world, with a combined annual group turnover in excess of US$1.8 billion, ICE operated a global network of over 300 bureaux de change branches, including 65 airports, across four continents.

ICE is a Private Limited Company owned by Lenlyn Group, and is a sister company of Raphaels Bank. The organisation's headquarters are in Piccadilly, London.

In 2016, the Chinese conglomerate HNA Group made a bid to buy the business as part of its European investment spree aimed at expanding its business outside Asia. However, the takeover was blocked by the UK government competition authority and the sale was canceled.

ICE UK ceased trading in 2022, going into administration as a result of the Covid restrictions; ICE retains operations in other locations including the USA and Ireland.

== See also ==
- Currency Exchange International
