= Suparna Airlines =

Chinese airline

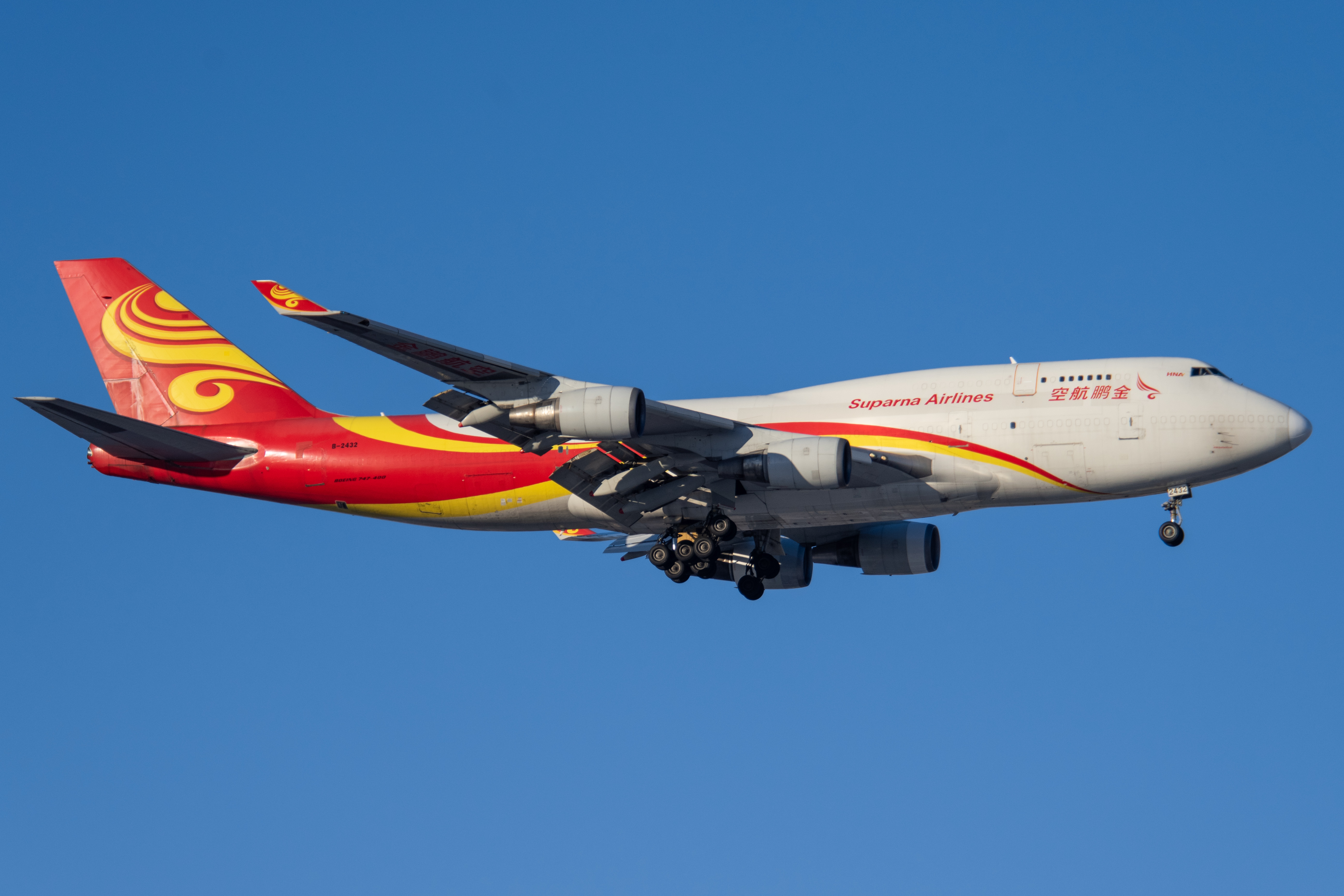
- A Boeing 747-400BDSF of Suparna Airlines
IATA	ICAO	Call sign
Y8	YZR	YANGTZE RIVER
- Founded: 15 January 2003; 23 years ago
- Hubs: Shanghai Pudong International Airport
- Fleet size: 12
- Destinations: 8
- Parent company: HNA Aviation
- Headquarters: Shanghai, China
- Website: www.yzr.com.cn

Suparna Airlines, known in Chinese as Jinpeng (Chinese: 金鹏航空; pinyin: Jīnpéng Hángkōng), is an airline based in China. Originally an all-cargo airline, it was formerly known as Yangtze River Express and later Yangtze River Airlines after launching passenger services. The company's headquarters are in Shanghai Pudong Development Bank Tower (Chinese: 浦发大厦; pinyin: Pǔ fā dà shà) in Pudong, Shanghai.

== History ==
Established on 15 January 2003 as the second cargo airline in the country after China Cargo Airlines, Yangtze River Express was majority owned by the HNA Group (85%) with Hainan Airlines Co (5%) and Shanghai Airport Group (10%) holding the remaining shares. The airline took over the entire cargo operations of Hainan Airlines, China Xinhua Airlines, Chang An Airlines and Shanxi Airlines, all members of the Hainan Air Group.

In 2006, it divested 49% of its shareholdings to a consortium of companies including China Airlines, Yang Ming Marine Transport Corporation, Wan Hai Lines and China Container Express Lines. China Airlines became the largest foreign shareholder, with a 25% stake.

The airline rebranded as Suparna Airlines on 7 July 2017; its new name comes from the mythical bird also known as a garuda. Suparna means "the one with the beautiful wings" in Sanskrit.

== Destinations ==
Cargo

Yangtze River Express applied for permission to serve Novosibirsk in Russia as well as Dallas–Fort Worth and Los Angeles in the United States from 2009, pending CAAC approval. They also serve some domestic and Asian routes. From 2010, round trip flights to and from Shanghai, Tianjin Binhai, Prague, Luxembourg, Shanghai, and Rotterdam have been operated. As of 2014, there are also Frankfurt Hahn, Tianjin-Binhai, and Shanghai-Pudong connections. In December 2023 airline launched operations to Moscow Oblast, Russia.

Passenger

On 15 December 2015, Yangtze River Airlines launched domestic passenger flights under its revised name. Routes initially included Shanghai-Pudong Airport to Guyang, Sanya and Zhuhai using a single Boeing 737-800. Permission was also granted for flights to Hong Kong, Macau and Taiwan.

== Fleet ==
=== Current fleet ===
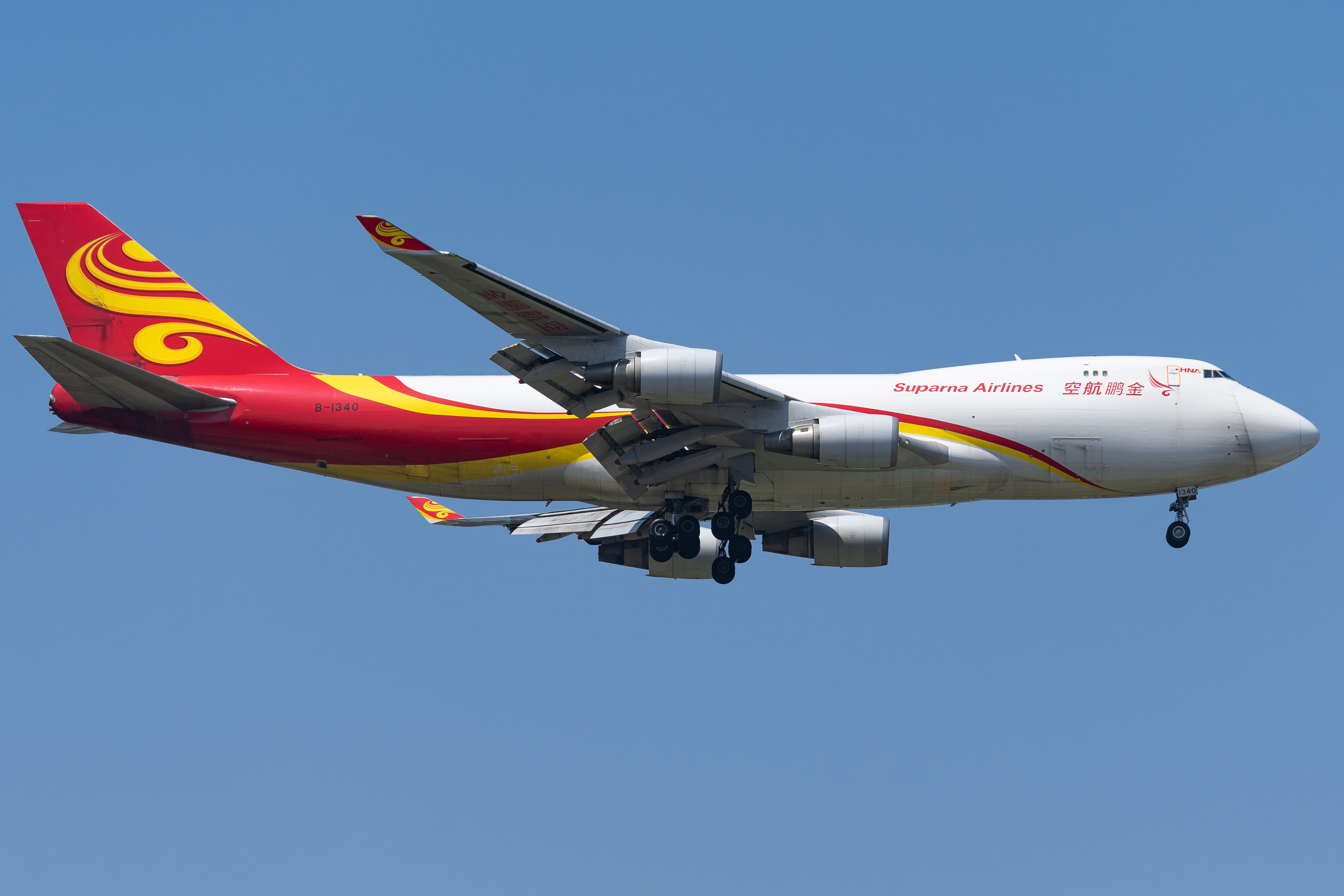
Suparna Airlines Boeing 747-400ERF

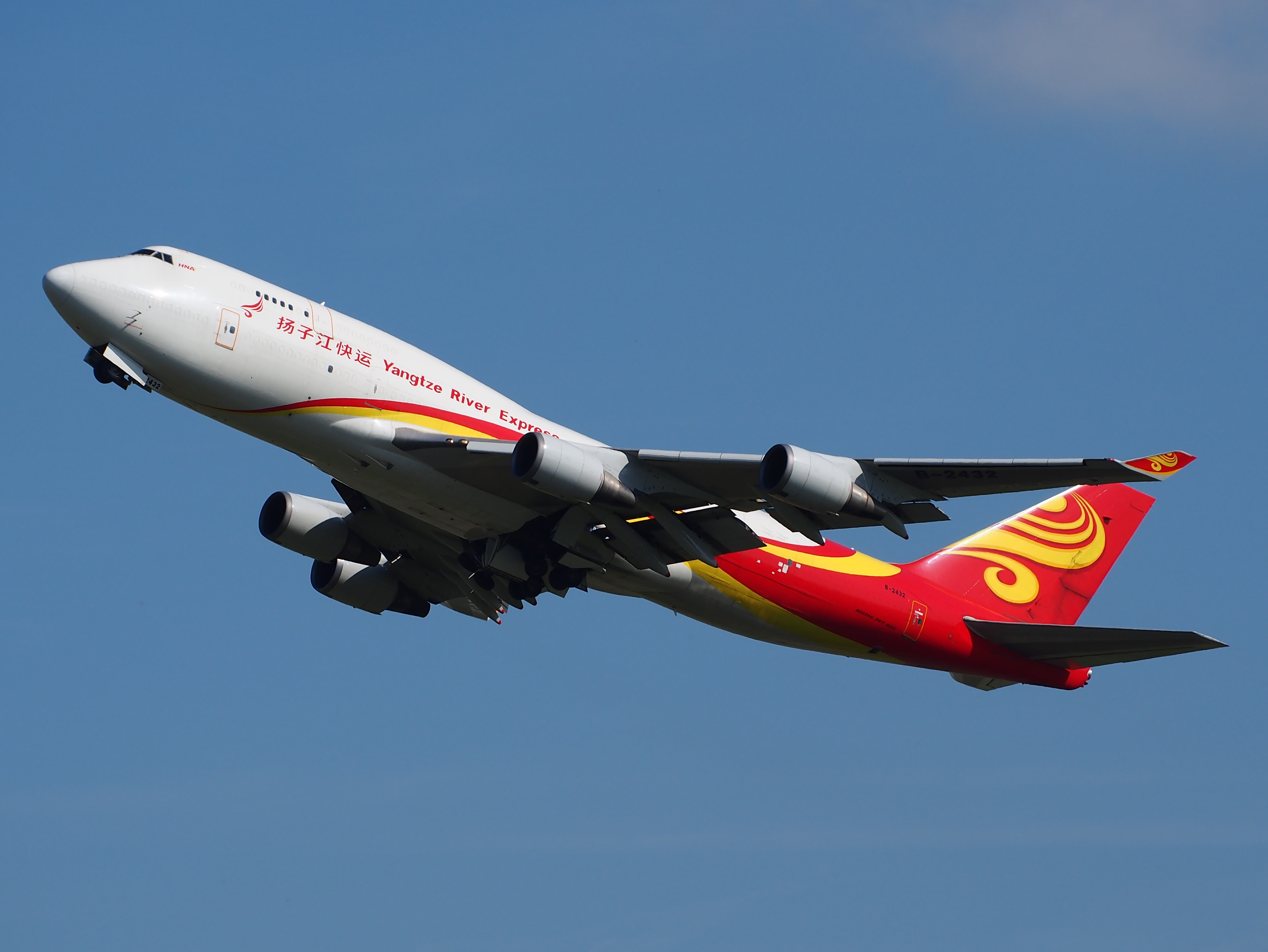
Yangtze River Express Boeing 747-400BDSF

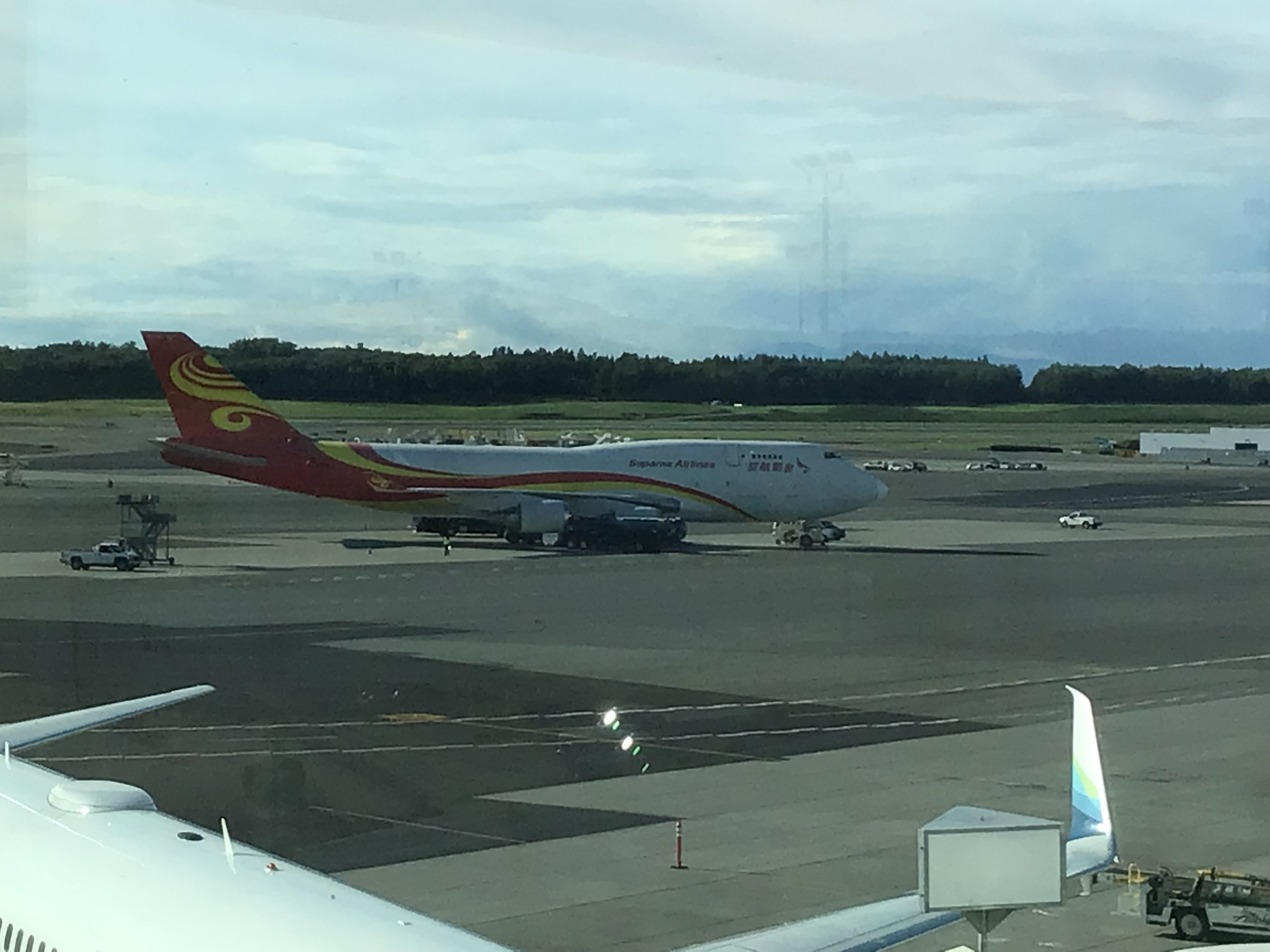
Suparna Airlines 747 plane at Ted Stevens Anchorage International Airport

As of September 2025, Suparna Airlines operates the following aircraft:

Suparna Airlines fleet
Aircraft	In fleet	Orders	Passengers				Notes
Aircraft	In fleet	Orders	J	W	Y	Total	Notes
Boeing 737-800	10	—	—	—	189	189	
Comac C919	—	30	TBA				
Cargo fleet
Boeing 747-400BDSF	2	—	Cargo				
Boeing 747-400ERF	1	—	Cargo				
Boeing 777F	2	—	Cargo				
Total	15	30					

=== Former fleet ===
Suparna Airlines retired fleet
Aircraft	Total	Introduced	Retired	Notes
Boeing 737-300F	11	2014	2022	
Boeing 737-400SF	3	2013	2022	
Boeing 787-8	1	2017	2018	Returned to Hainan Airlines.
Boeing 787-9	2	2019	2022	Both aircraft transferred into MIAT Mongolian Airlines.
