= HNA Technology Investments Holdings =

Leadway Technology Investments Holdings
- Formerly: Advanced Card Systems Holdings, HNA Technology Investments Holdings
- Company type: Public
- Traded as: SEHK: 2086
- Predecessor: Advanced Card Systems
Founded
1995 in Hong Kong	(predecessor)
2003 in Cayman Islands
- Headquarters: Hong Kong
- Area served: Worldwide
- Key people: Tong Fu (chairman)
- Products: Smart cards
- Brands: ACS; HNA Tech Inv
- Revenue: ▲HK$182.272 million (2017)
- Net income: ▲HK$5.689 million (2017)
- Total assets: HK$181.743 million (2017)
- Total equity: ▲HK$153.701 million (2017)
- Owner: HNA EcoTech Group (75%)
- Parent: HNA EcoTech Group
Subsidiaries
HNA Technology Investments	(100%)
Advanced Card Systems	(100%)
- Website: www.hnatechinv.com
- Footnotes / references in consolidated financial statement

Leadway Technology Investments Holdings Limited formerly known as Advanced Card Systems Holdings Limited & HNA Technology Investments Holdings is a Cayman Islands-incorporated offshore holding company. Its subsidiary, Advanced Card Systems Limited, was incorporated in British Hong Kong in 1995 by Denny Wong. In 2017, HNA Group, via HNA EcoTech Group and HNA EcoTech Group's subsidiary, acquired Advanced Card Systems Holdings as part of a reverse IPO.

ACS develops smart cards, smart card readers and related products, and distributes them to over one hundred countries. It was ranked by Frost & Sullivan as one of the world's top 3 suppliers and Asia Pacific's top supplier of PC-linked Smart Card Readers. In 2010, 2014, and 2015, it was listed among Forbes Asia's "Best Under a Billion", a prestigious list of 200 top-performing companies with sales between US$5 million and US$1 billion, selected from publicly listed enterprises in Asia Pacific.

== History ==
Advanced Card Systems Holdings was acquired by HNA Group, via a subsidiary HNA EcoTech Group (Chinese: 海航生态科技集团) in January 2017. HNA Group owned more than a third of the share capital of HNA EcoTech Group. Advanced Card Systems Holdings was renamed to HNA Technology Investments Holdings Limited in August 2017.

== Products and services ==
ACS develops and supplies smart card reading and writing devices, smart cards, and other related products categorized into the following product lines:

- Smart card and card operating systems
- PC-linked smart card readers
- Mobile card readers
- Contactless readers
- Smart card readers with PIN-pad
- PC-linked readers with mass storage
- Dynamic Password Generators
- Smart card reader modules
- Software development kits

ACS products are certified and compliant with global and national industry standards. These standards include NFC Forum Certification; EMV Level 1 & 2; Visa payWave; MasterCard PayPass; American ExpressPay; Discover Zip; UnionPay QuickPass; Mondex; EMV CAP and VISA DPA; qPBOC and PBOC (the People's Bank of China); NETS (Singapore); CE; UL/CSA; U.S. Federal Communications Commission (FCC); VCCI (Voluntary Control Council for Interference by Information Technology Equipment); FIPS (Federal Information Processing Standards); and Registration, Evaluation, Authorisation and Restriction of Chemicals (REACH).

ACS also offers product customization services to meet customer specifications. These include custom branding on ACS smart card and reader products.

ACS also provides end-to-end, smart card‒based services. ACS has already delivered automatic fare collection (AFC), retail, and micropayment services all over the world.

Furthermore, ACS conducts consultation and training sessions to help grow the smart card industry. In 2008, ACS offered an elective course on smart card technology in De La Salle University – Manila. In 2010, it conducted the first ever basic smart card training in the Philippines. It also conducted a two-day training on smart cards in the Information Technology Services Center (ITSC) of the Chinese University of Hong Kong (CUHK).

== Applications ==
System integrators, software developers and service houses worldwide use ACS smart card and card reader technologies, to create smart card-based applications for security systems in various sectors, including banking, transportation, identification, e-health, e-government, access control and e-commerce.

=== Banking ===
In 2009, ACS deployed 100,000 ACR38 Smart Card Readers for the implementation of an online home banking project in an East Asian country. The project involved ACS's cooperation with the country's local bank and telecommunication company, to integrate ACS smart card technologies into VoIP-enabled desktop phones that customers used to access online banking services at home.

In 2009, ACS also received over 60,000 orders of ACR30 Smart Card Readers from Hong Kong banks. This banks were complying with the Hong Kong secure e-banking project, which entailed using the Hong Kong Identity Card. Following Hong Kong Monetary Authority (HKMA) guidelines that took effect in July 2005, these banks employed two-factor authentication tools, like e-Cert, for high-risk online banking transactions. The Bank of America (Asia), BOC Credit Card (International) Limited, Bank of China (Hong Kong), Chiyu Banking Corporation Limited, Nanyang Commercial Bank, Bank of Communications (Hong Kong Branch), The Bank of East Asia, CITIC Ka Wah Bank and Dah Sing Bank all used ACS's ACR30 to read smart ID cards embedded with Hong Kong Post e-Cert.

=== Access control ===
In 2011, ACS was chosen as a smart card reader supplier for a service intended to secure US embassies worldwide. The US Department of State (DoS) had initiated a tender for a reader to secure physical and logical networks for embassy employees. Partnered with one of the bidders, ACS proposed the ACR3801 Smart card reader, a TAA-compliant, FIPS 201‒certified PC-linked reader. These standards enabled the ACR3801 to meet the security challenges presented by the DoS.

ACS also participated in the security enhancement project set up by the World Olympians Association (WOA) for the 2008 Beijing Olympics. ACS provided ACOS3 Microcontroller Smart Cards to identify around 4,000 guests, and ACR88 Handheld PIN-Pad Readers to read the smart cards. ACS partnered with Artemis Solutions Group (ASG), which specialized in providing a complete credential management system for attendees of the Olympic Reunion Center (ORC).

=== Transportation ===
In August 2009, ACS supplied ACR122 Near Field Communication (NFC) Readers for EZ-Link cardholders to manage their new EZ-Link cards at home. Via the EZ-Online System, cardholders can check and print their 20 most recent transaction records, top-up their cards from a bank account, and load EZ-Coupons that may be used to redeem bonuses once the Ez-Link cards are presented to retail shops.

=== Government ===
In 2013, ACS was chosen by a Middle Eastern country's Ministry of Labour to supply smart card readers that will help make labour transactions paperless and performable outside government offices. ACS supplied the ACR89, which was distributed directly to organizations and installed in service centers throughout the country, so that they may be more conveniently accessed by company operators and owners. This accessibility, coupled with a secure authentication system, generated savings for both the government, and various companies and organizations; simplified processes; and improved records management.

Also, over 100,000 ACS ACR38 Smart Card Readers were deployed during the pilot run of the project, "Belgian eID card reader for the 12-year-olds" in 2006. The decision to utilize ACS smart card readers was issued by the Federal Information and Communication Technology (FedICT) Department of the Belgian Government.

In the same year, the Egyptian Government, began issuing smart taxation cards to taxpayers for security reasons. ACS's ACR100 SIMFlash Smart Card Readers were used to input, check and back-up transaction information of the taxpayers.

=== eHealth ===
In 2008, ACS won a tender to supply 600,000 units of PC-linked contact smart card readers to the regional government of Lombardia, Italy. The readers were used for read and write operations on health cards used by Lombardian citizens, pharmacies, doctors, hospitals, etc., to access medical services, as well as online government services.

=== Retails ===
In 2013, ACS was chosen as the primary technology partner of the Philippines' largest mall developer/operator and retail company for an end-to-end loyalty, payment, and automated fare collection (AFC) service. ACS's scalable service enabled faster and convenient transactions for mall visitors, while improving generation, accessibility, and management of transaction reports.

In 2006, ACS's ACR120 contactless smart card readers were adopted by a high-end Japanese supermarket in Hong Kong for its customer loyalty program, which began transitioning from contact to contactless smart card technology in 2005.

Meanwhile, ACS was selected to provide ACR122 contactless card readers to Pacific Century CyberWorks Limited (PCCW) Hong Kong in 2008. ACR 122 Octopus card readers were made available to be connected to PCCW's multimedia VoIP phone, thus allowing cardholders to check their card balance and their ten most recent transactions in the Hong Kong Octopus Card without the need for Octopus Enquiry Machines that are located in MTR stations only.
