= China Xinhua Airlines =

Chinese airline

China Xinhua Airlines 中国新华航空
IATA	ICAO	Call sign
XW	CXH	XINHUA
- Founded: 1992
- Ceased operations: November 29, 2007 (merged to form Grand China Air)
- Fleet size: 5
- Parent company: HNA Aviation
- Headquarters: Beijing, China
- Website: www.chinaxinhuaair.com

China Xinhua Airlines (simplified Chinese: 中国新华航空; traditional Chinese: 中國新華航空; pinyin: Zhōngguó Xīnhuá Hángkōng) was an airline based in Chaoyang District, Beijing, China. It operated scheduled trunk services and charter flights. Its main bases were Beijing Capital International Airport and Tianjin Binhai International Airport. On November 29, 2007, it merged with Shanxi Airlines and Chang An Airlines to form Grand China Air, a subsidiary of Hainan Airlines.

== History ==
The airline was established in August 1992 and started operations on 6 June 1993. In April 1997, it became a partner in the creation of Oriental Falcon Jet Service, with Dassault Falcon Jet and Avion Pacific to operate Falcon 50 charter operations in China. It is a subsidiary of Hainan Airlines which holds a 60% stake in the airline. The relative bases of operation have been regulated in international airports which understood them and the international airport of Tianjin Binhai, principally taking care itself of the domestic passenger and the transport of cargo. In the month of February 2001, it has been re-united from the group of the Shenhua and from the group of HNA and it has been transformed in a main enterprise in the group of the transport of the HNA Air. Before the union, the overhead management of Xinhua has installed a nearly complete system of the flight transport, the maintenance, the sale, air, and the administration of service, control and emergency of the earth and the good obtained performances, maintain an annotation of no accidental incidents for 8 years.

== Fleet ==
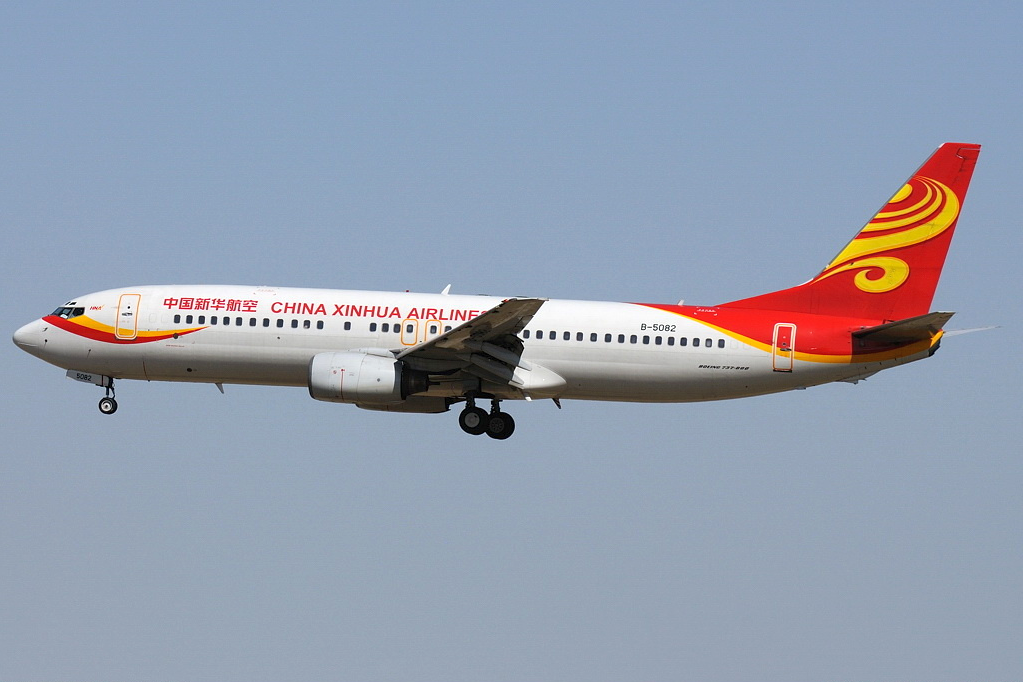
China Xinhua Airlines Boeing 737-800 at Beijing Capital Airport (2011). The livery worn by this aircraft evidences the parenthood of Hainan Airlines over China Xinhua Airlines.

The China Xinhua Airlines fleet consisted of the following aircraft (as of August 2019):

China Xinhua Airlines fleet
Aircraft	In service	Passengers
Boeing 737-800	5	
Total	5	

The airline fleet previously included the following aircraft:

- 6 Boeing 737-300
- 3 Boeing 737-400
- 2 further Boeing 737-800
