= HNA Building =

Coordinates: 20.020336°N 110.34014°E

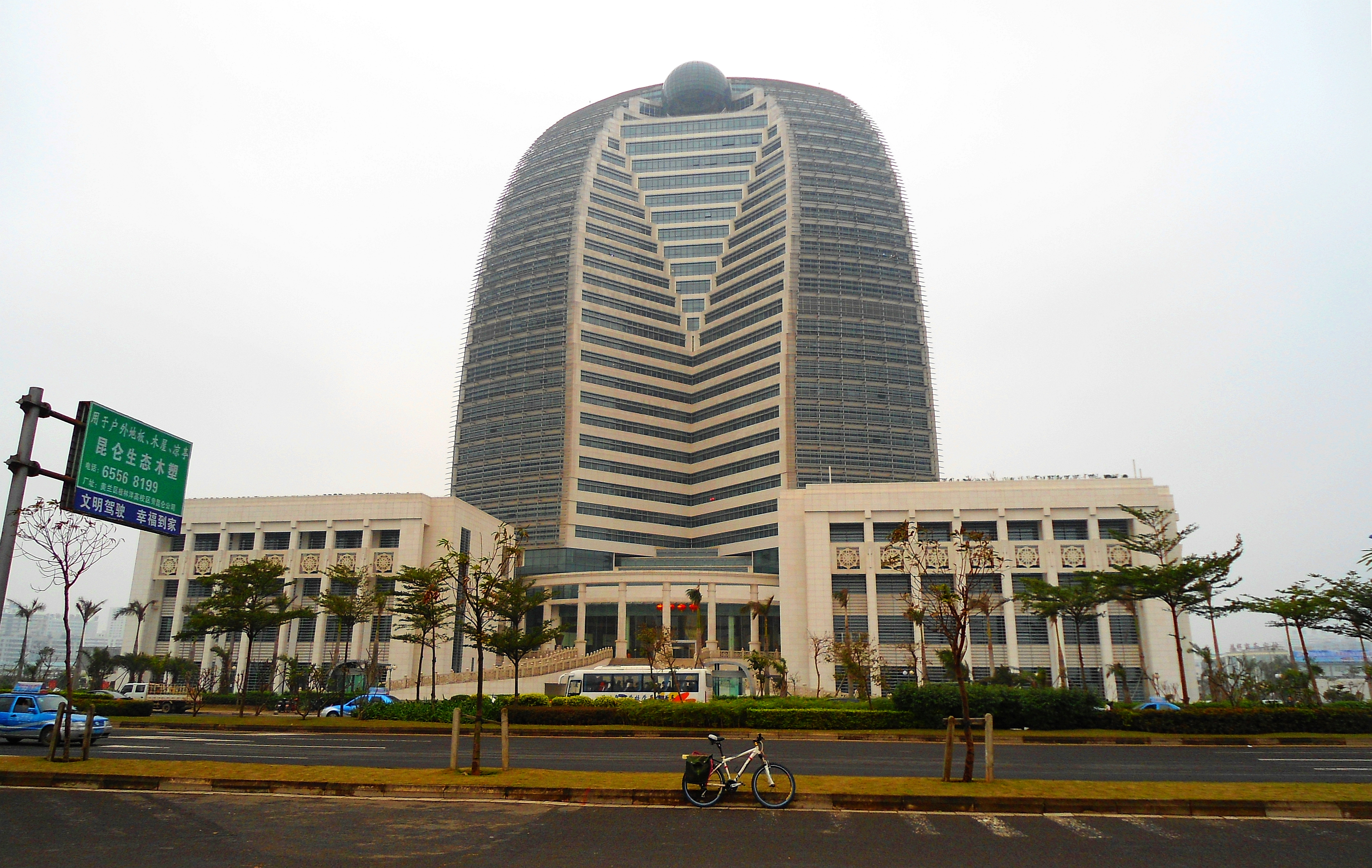
- Interactive map of the HNA Building area

General information
- Type: Office
- Location: No. 7 Guoxing Avenue; Haikou, Hainan, China
- Opening: May 31, 2008
- Owner: Hainan Airlines; HNA Group

Height
- Architectural: 138.45 m (454.2 ft)

Technical details
- Floor count: 38 (plus 4 annex and 3 basement floors)

The HNA Building (Chinese: 新海航大厦; pinyin: XīnHǎiháng Dàshà), also known as the New Haihang Building or Xin Haihang Dasha, is the headquarters for Hainan Airlines and the now-defunct HNA Group. It is located at the west end of Guoxing Avenue on the north side of the road, in Haikou, Hainan, China.

== Gallery ==
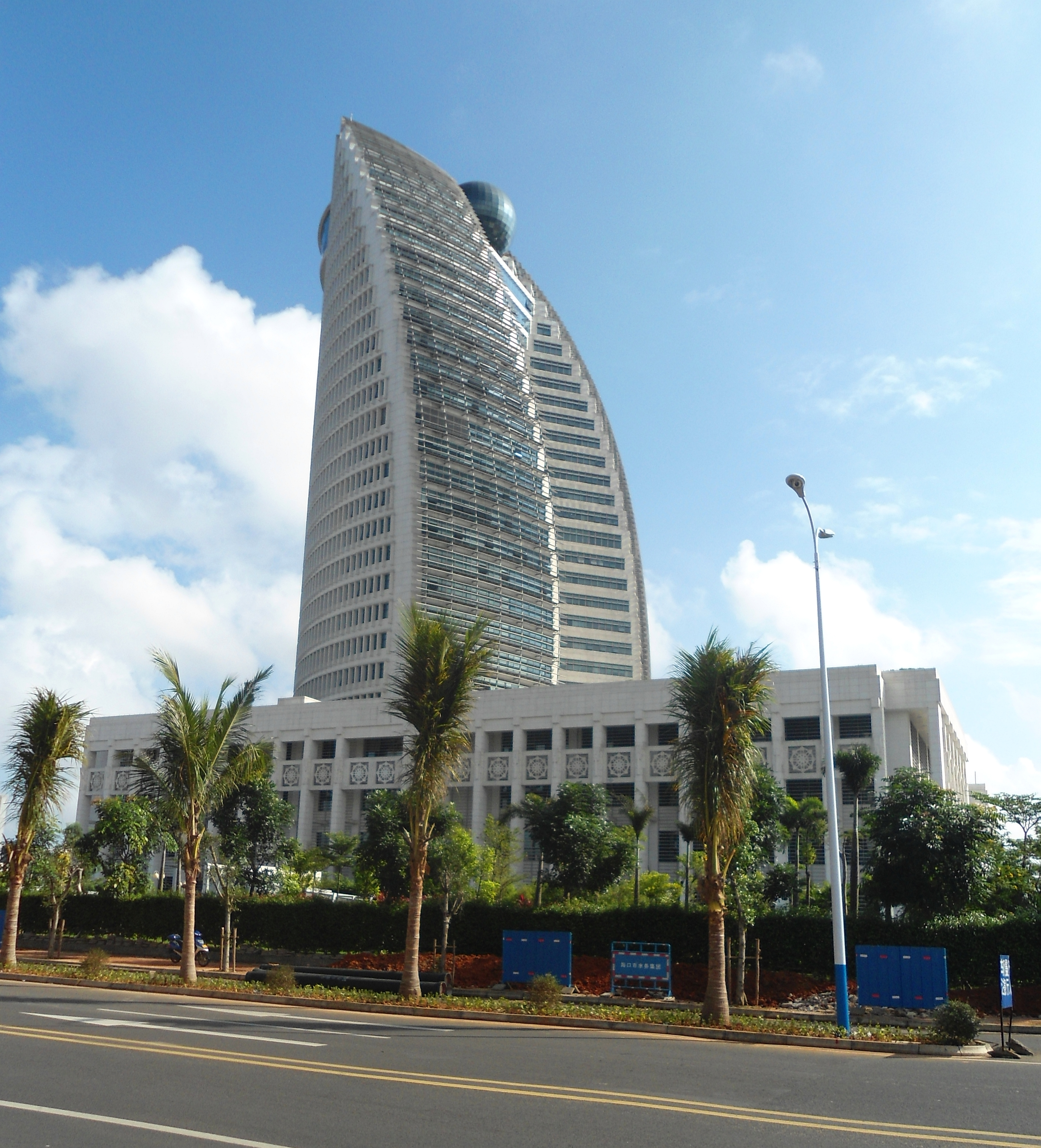
Side view

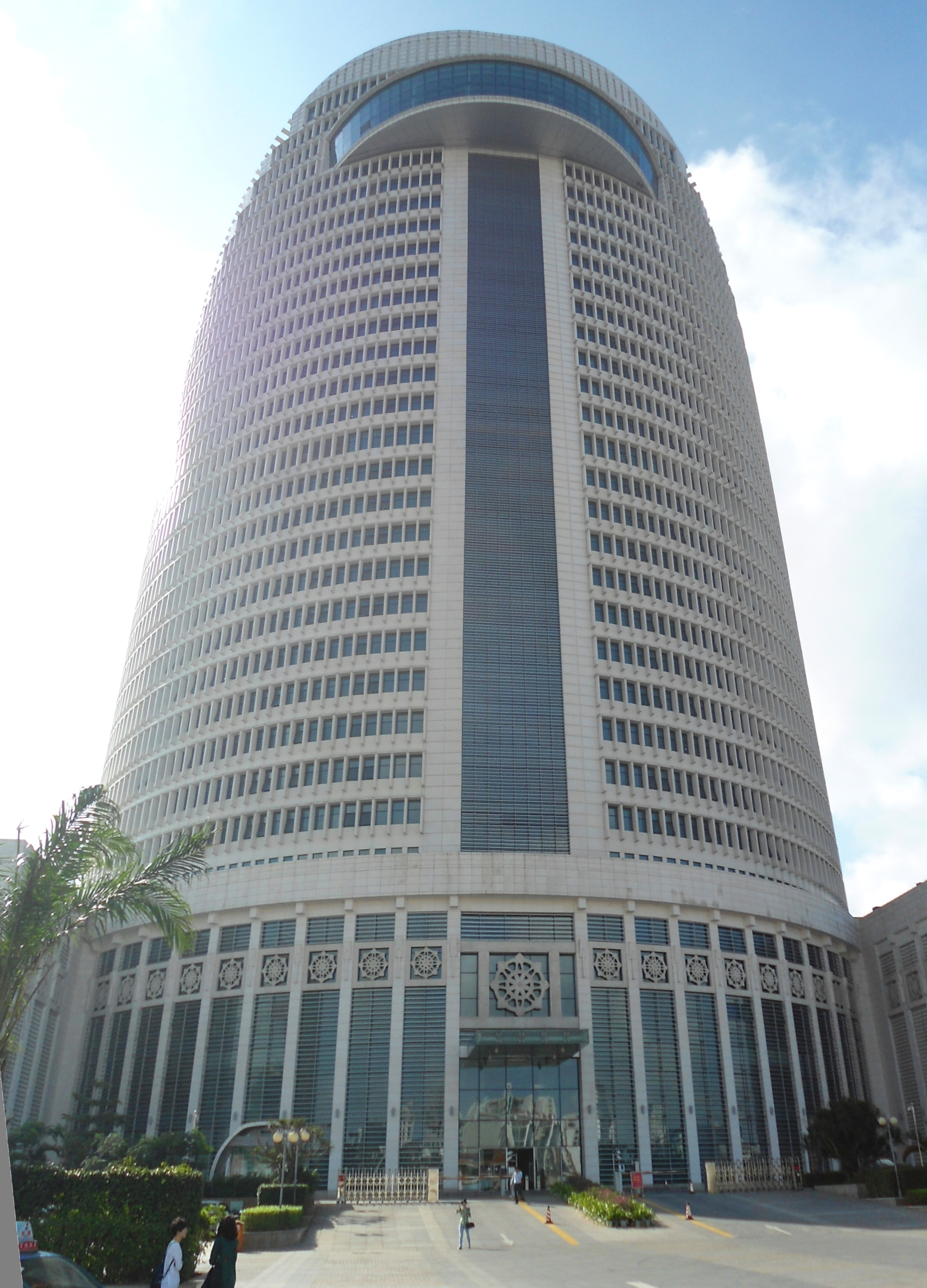
Rear view

The HNA Building at night showing animated globe and surface of building

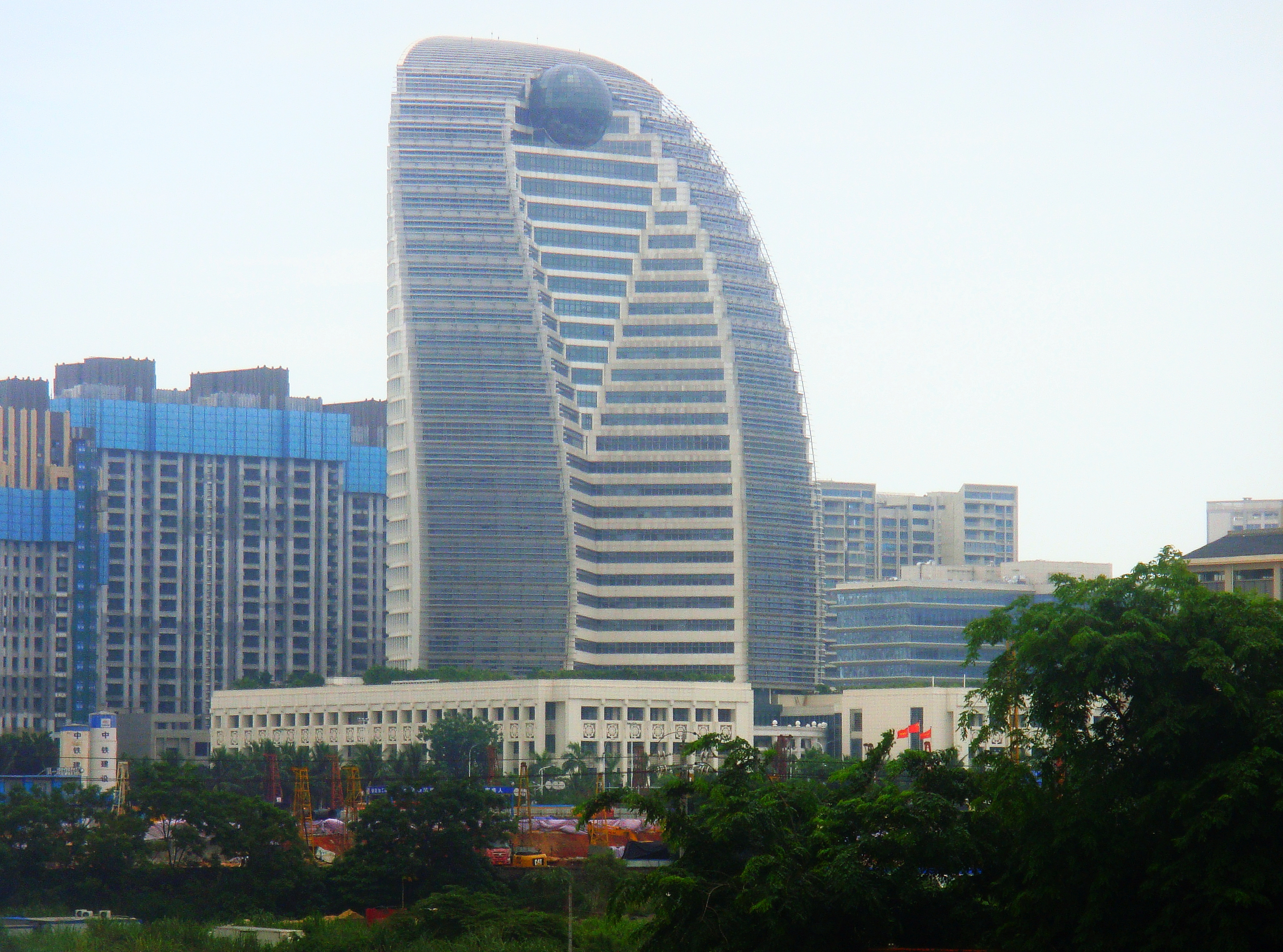
Viewed from the southwest
