= Liaoning Fangda Group Industrial =

Chinese company

Liaoning Fangda Group Industrial Company Ltd.
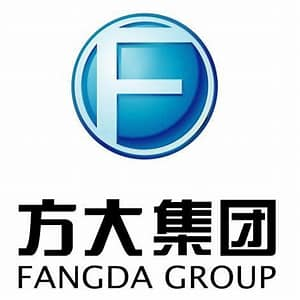
- Industry: Carbon, chemicals, medical, steel products manufacturing, real estate development, mining, coking, aviation
- Founded: April 2000
- Headquarters: Building 9 Area 15 ABP 188 South 4th Ring West Road Beijing 100070 China, China
- Key people: Cheng Ren Huang (CFO)
- Website: www.hexiefangda.com

Liaoning Fangda Group Industrial Company Ltd. is a Chinese industrial conglomerate focusing on carbon, chemicals, medical, steel products manufacturing, real estate development, mining, coking, aviation and other services. The headquarters is in Chaoyang District, Beijing.

As of September 24, 2021, Liaoning Fangda Group Industrial Company Ltd. took over control in HNA Group's Aviation division, including its flagship Hainan Airlines.

== Companies owned by Liaoning Fangda ==
- HNA Aviation - acquired from HNA Group in 2021
- Fangda Carbon New Material Co. (formerly Lanzhou Hailong New Material Co.)
- Northeastern Pharmaceutical Group (formerly Northeast Pharmaceutical General Factory (founded1946))
- Fangda Special Steel Technology Co,
- Northern Heavy Industry Group Co., Ltd. (NHI)
