= Maastricht School of Management =

Dutch business school

Maastricht School of Management (MSM)
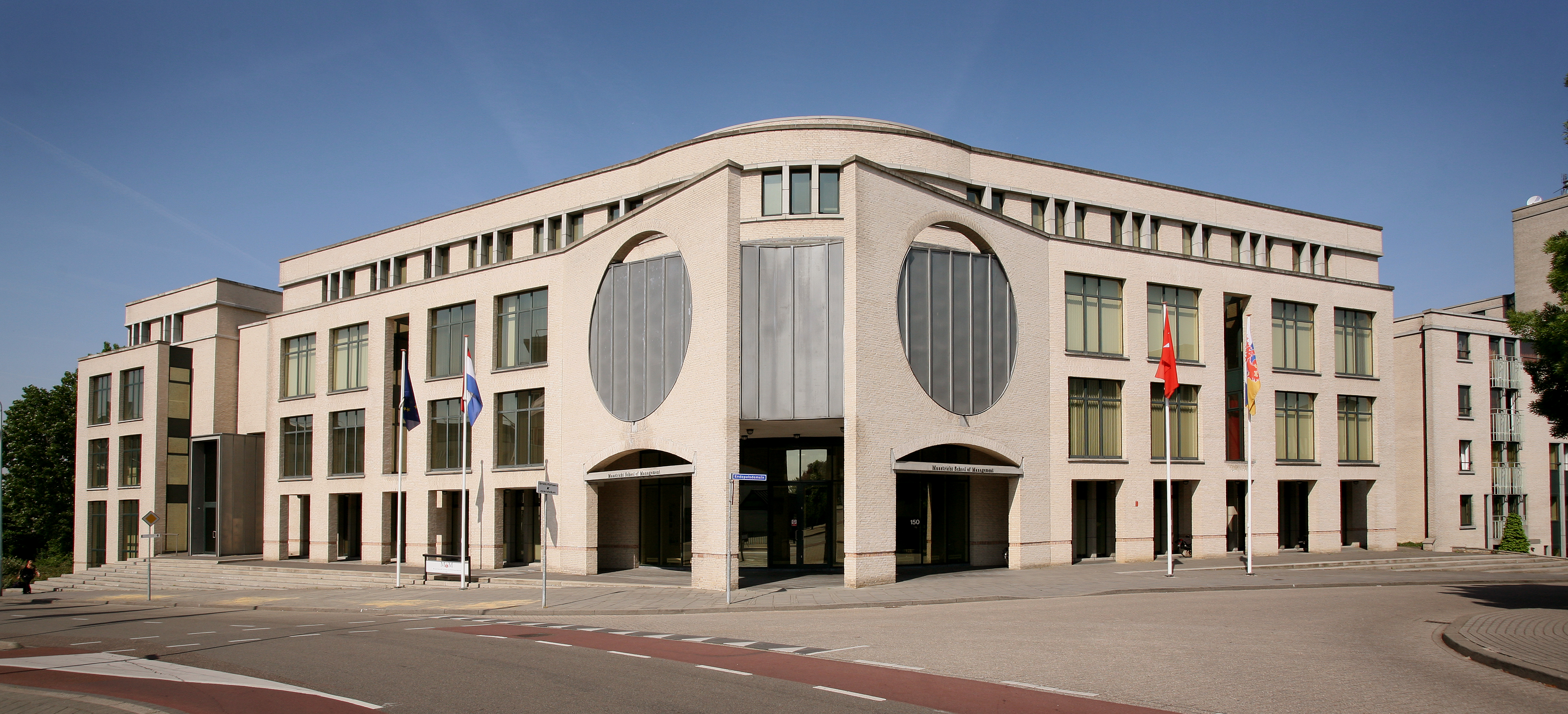
- Motto: "Working together for better global management"
- Type: Private, not-for-profit institution
- Established: 1952
- Affiliations: AMBA, NVAO, ACBSP, IACBE, ATHEA
- Chairman: Léon Frissen
- Supervisory Board: Frans Tummers, Monique Caubo, Jeroen Jansen, Frans Weekers
- Students: 2000
- Location: Maastricht, The Netherlands; 50.8374°N 5.7159°E
- Website: www.msm.nl

The Maastricht School of Management (MSM) is a management school in Maastricht, the Netherlands. From 1 September 2022 MSM is part of the School of Business and Economics (SBE) of Maastricht University. MSM's activities in the fields of education, research, and capacity building continue as part of the University of Maastricht (UM).

== Programs ==
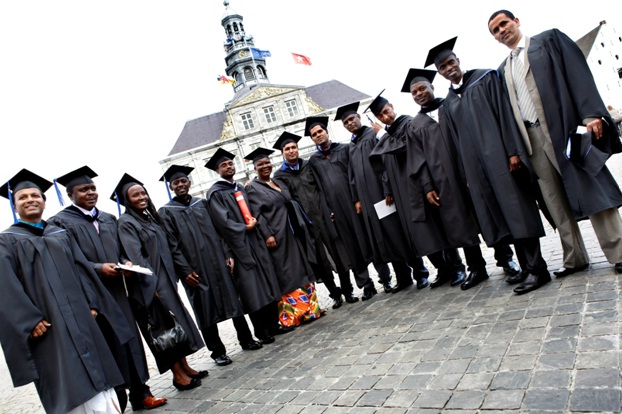
Graduates of MSM in Maastricht

MSM offers accredited programs in Maastricht and in collaboration with partner institutions in a number of countries across the world. Core programs are the Master of Business Administration (MBA), Executive MBA (EMBA), and Doctor of Business Administration (DBA). Furthermore, the School offers Master of Science (MSc), Master in Management, Online MBA and a range of executive programs.

== Accreditations ==
All the degree programs of MSM are subject to the standards set by the following international accrediting bodies: AMBA, IACBE and ACBSP.

All the degree and non-degree programs of MSM are subject to the standards set by the international accrediting body: ATHEA.

All MSc / MBA programs of MSM offered in the Netherlands are subject to NVAO accreditation.

== Projects ==
The school engages in development projects involving the public and private sectors in collaboration with international development agencies and donor organizations. It is also recognized by the Chinese government. MSM is in partnership with the Nanjing University Business School.
