= Air Changan =

Chinese airline

Air Changan 长安航空

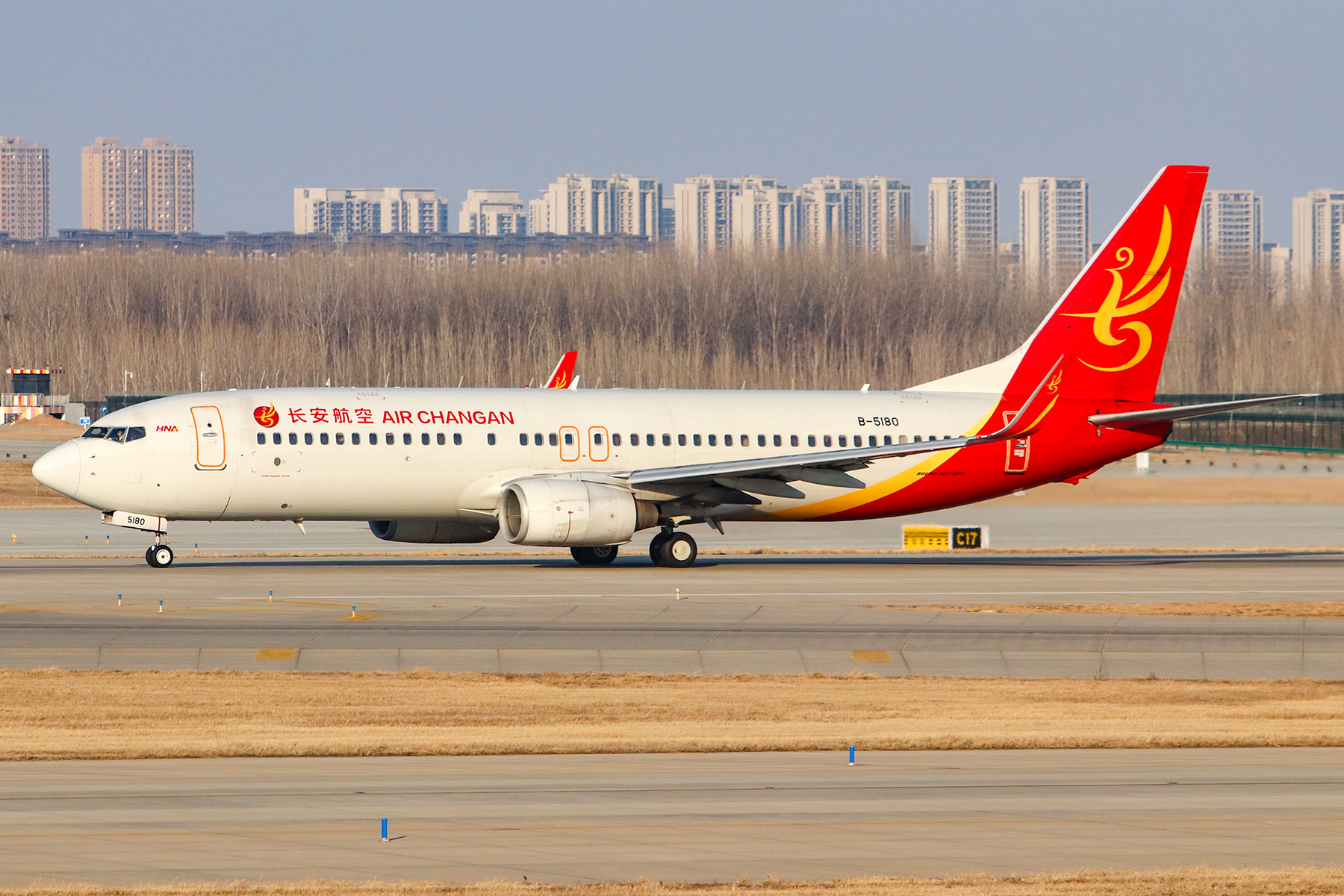
IATA	ICAO	Call sign
9H	CGN	CHANG AN
- Founded: 11 April 1992; 34 years ago
- Commenced operations: 5 January 1993; 33 years ago
- Operating bases: Xi'an Xianyang International Airport
- Fleet size: 13
- Destinations: 33
- Parent company: HNA Aviation (59.43%)
- Headquarters: Xi'an, Shaanxi
- Website: www.airchangan.com

Air Changan (simplified Chinese: 长安航空; traditional Chinese: 長安航空; pinyin: Cháng'ān Hángkōng) is a Chinese domestic airline. Its main operating base is Xi'an Xianyang International Airport, serving several cities in Shaanxi Province. Initially an independent carrier, Air Changan merged with Hainan Airlines in 2000 and was later absorbed into that airline. Air Changan resumed service as an independent airline in May 2016, providing flights to four Chinese cities with three Boeing 737-800 aircraft.

== History ==
In order to develop the local economy and aviation industry, in September 1990, the Shaanxi provincial government and local aircraft manufacturers began planning for a local airline, to operate with three Xian Y-7 aircraft. On 2 March 1992, the provincial government named the airline as Air Changan. On 11 April 1992, Air Changan was formally founded, merging Dapeng Airlines in to the new entity. On 5 January 1993, the first flight of Air Changan operated, from Xi'an to Yulin. Then was transfer to be operated by the provincial government only, after the aircraft manufacturers left the venture due to new regulations coming into effect.

On 30 August 2000, Air Changan was purchased by Hainan Airlines (HNA) and renamed Chang An Airlines. On 1 July 2002, the first Boeing 737-400 was put into operation. In October 2002, Chang An Airlines, Xinhua Airlines and Shanxi Airlines were merged into Hainan Airlines.

In December 2015, HNA Group began negotiates with the Shaanxi provincial government regarding the restoration of Chang An Airlines as an independent carrier. The airline would return to its original focus of flights within and out of Shaanxi Province. The airline rebranded as its original name and unveiled its own livery. After receiving its air operator certificate in April 2016, Air Changan resumed operations as an independent airline the following month on 9 May. The inaugural flight was from Xi'an to Zhuhai, Guangdong. During the customary water salute upon arrival in Zhuhai, the fire engines accidentally sprayed foam instead. As a result, the aircraft had to undergo a safety check, and the return flight was cancelled.

== Corporate affairs ==
Hainan Airlines holds an 83.3% stake in the airline, up 21.9% following a 1.01 billion yuan share purchase in September 2015.

== Destinations ==
=== People's Republic of China ===
- Beihai, Guangxi - Beihai Fucheng Airport
- Changchun, Jilin - Changchun Longjia International Airport
- Chizhou, Anhui - Chizhou Jiuhuashan Airport
- Dalian, Liaoning - Dalian Zhoushuizi International Airport
- Dunhuang, Gansu - Dunhuang Airport
- Fuzhou, Fujian - Fuzhou Changle International Airport
- Guilin, Guangxi - Guilin Liangjiang International Airport
- Guiyang, Guizhou - Guiyang Longdongbao International Airport
- Haikou, Hainan - Haikou Meilan International Airport
- Hailar District, Inner Mongolia - Hulunbuir Hailar Airport
- Hanzhong, Shaanxi - Hanzhong Chenggu Airport
- Hefei, Anhui - Hefei Xinqiao International Airport
- Huai'an, Jiangsu - Huai'an Lianshui Airport
- Huaihua, Hunan - Huaihua Zhijiang Airport
- Huizhou, Guangdong - Huizhou Pingtan Airport
- Jieyang, Guangdong - Jieyang Chaoshan International Airport
- Jingdezhen, Jiangxi - Jingdezhen Luojia Airport
- Lanzhou, Gansu - Lanzhou Zhongchuan International Airport
- Lianyungang, Jiangsu - Lianyungang Baitabu Airport
- Luoyang, Henan - Luoyang Beijiao Airport
- Mudanjiang, Heilongjiang - Mudanjiang Hailang International Airport
- Nanchang, Jiangxi - Nanchang Changbei International Airport
- Nantong, Jiangsu - Nantong Xingdong Airport
- Ningbo, Zhejiang - Ningbo Lishe International Airport
- Qinhuangdao, Hebei - Qinhuangdao Beidaihe Airport
- Sanya, Hainan - Sanya Phoenix International Airport
- Shenyang, Liaoning - Shenyang Taoxian International Airport
- Shijiazhuang, Hebei - Shijiazhuang Zhengding International Airport
- Taizhou, Zhejiang - Taizhou Luqiao Airport
- Tongliao, Inner Mongolia - Tongliao Airport
- Tongren, Guizhou - Tongren Fenghuang Airport
- Weifang, Shandong - Weifang Airport
- Wenzhou, Zhejiang - Wenzhou Longwan International Airport
- Xi'an, Shaanxi - Xi'an Xianyang International Airport
- Xiamen, Fujian - Xiamen Gaoqi International Airport
- Xining, Qinghai - Xining Caojiabao International Airport
- Yancheng, Jiangsu - Yancheng Nanyang International Airport
- Yantai, Shandong - Yantai Penglai International Airport
- Yichang, Hubei - Yichang Sanxia Airport
- Yinchuan, Ningxia - Yinchuan Hedong International Airport
- Yingkou, Liaoning - Yingkou Lanqi Airport
- Zhuhai, Guangdong - Zhuhai Jinwan Airport

== Fleet ==
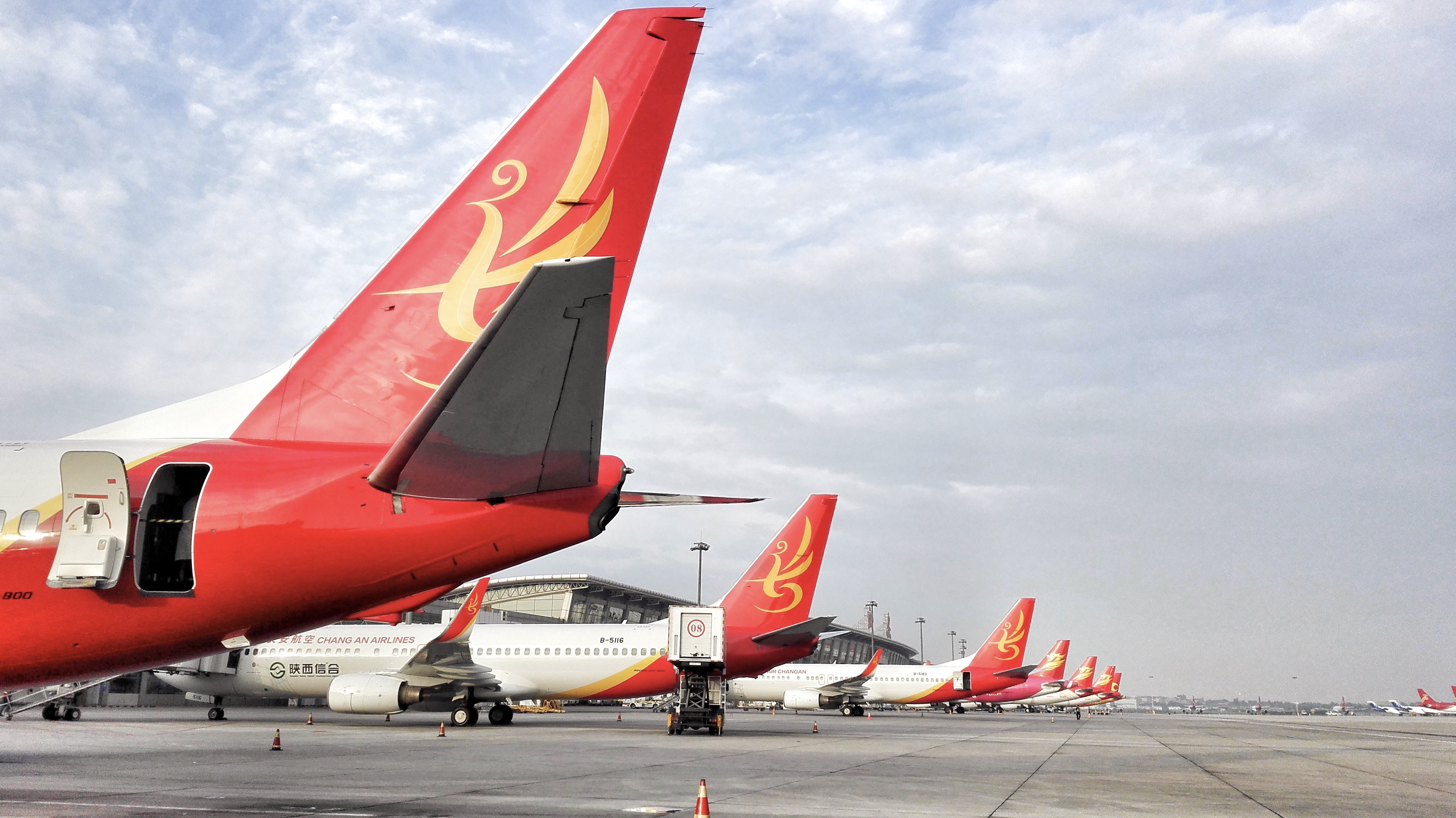
Three of the airline's Boeing 737-800s parked in a row in 2016. The aircraft furthest away wears Air Changan titles, while the middle of the three wears Chang An Airlines titles.

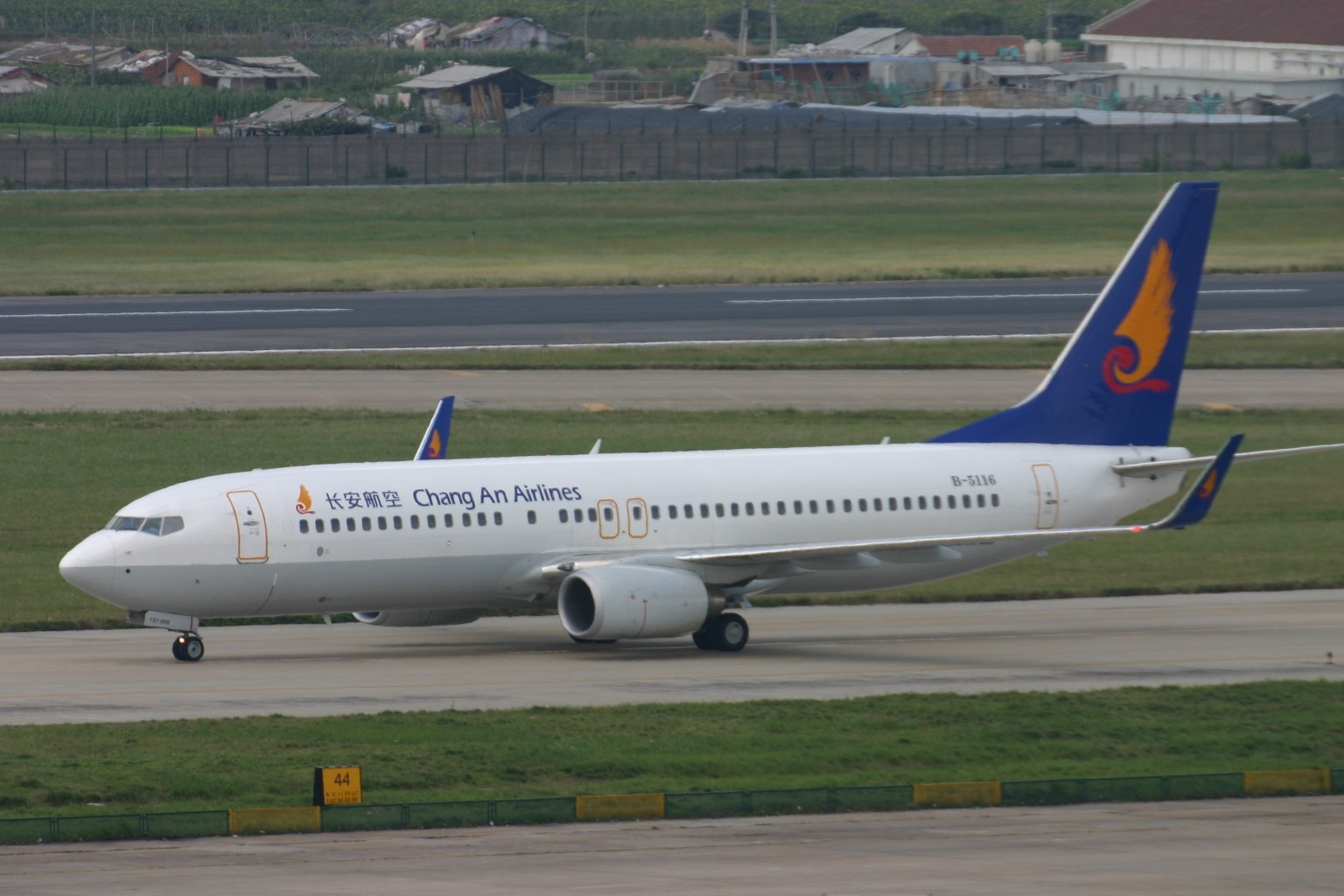
Air Changan Boeing 737-800 in 2012, wearing the pre–Hainan Airlines merger livery

=== Current fleet ===
As of August 2025, Air Changan operates the following aircraft:

Air Changan fleet
Aircraft	In service	Orders	Passengers	Notes
Boeing 737-800	13	—	186	
Boeing 737-800	13	—	189	
Total	13	—		

=== Previously operated ===
Air Changan previously operated the following aircraft:

- Airbus A319
- Boeing 737-400
- Boeing 737-700
- Bombardier Dash 8 Q400
- Embraer 190
- Fairchild-Dornier 328-300
- Xian MA60
- Xian Y-7
