= HNA Infrastructure Investment Group =

- Formerly: The First Investment and Merchant; Hainan Zhuxin Investment; Hainan Island Construction
- Company type: Public
- Traded as: SSE: 600515
- Industry: Real estate, transport
- Founded: 12 May 1993
- Headquarters: Haikou, Hainan, China
- Services: airport and seaport construction and operation

Hainan HNA Infrastructure Investment Group Co., Ltd.
- Simplified Chinese: 海南海航基础设施投资集团股份有限公司
Transcriptions

HNA Infrastructure
- Simplified Chinese: 海航基础
Transcriptions

Hainan HNA Infrastructure Investment Group Co., Ltd. formerly Hainan Island Construction Co., Ltd. is a Chinese listed company based in Haikou.

The registered office was located in Meilan, but the general office was located in West Zone 21/F, HNA Building on 7 Guoxing Avenue.

== History ==
=== HNA Infrastructure Investment Group ===
The predecessor of HNA Infrastructure Investment Group was incorporated on 12 May 1993 as The First Investment and Merchant (Chinese: 第一投资招商). In 2002 it became a listed company in Shanghai Stock Exchange. In 2008 the company was renamed to Hainan Zhuxin Investment (Chinese: 海南筑信投资) and again in 2011 to Hainan Island Construction (Chinese: 海南海岛建设). In 2009 a subsidiary of HNA Group (Chinese: 海航置业控股(集团)) formed a new intermediate holding company with the largest (Chinese: 天津市大通建设发展集团) and second largest shareholder (Chinese: 天津市艺豪科技发展) of the listed company, making HNA Group was the indirect largest shareholder for 23.59% shares (69.7225 million in number). In 2012 another subsidiary of HNA Group (Chinese: 海航国际旅游岛开发建设(集团); lit. 'Hainan International Tourism Island Development and Construction Group') acquired a significant stake (30.09%) of the company, by acquiring 127,214,170 number of new shares for CN¥6.21 each; the ex-largest shareholder still owned 9.40% shares at that time as the second largest, making HNA Group owned 39.49% combined indirectly.

In December 2013, the 75% stake of the intermediate parent company: Hainan International Tourism Island was transferred to another direct subsidiary of HNA Group: HNA Infrastructure Group (Chinese: 海航基础产业集团) as share capital for CN¥3.034 billion (the minority shareholder retained 25% stake); on 31 August 2015 the shares of Hainan Island Construction were transferred to another subsidiary of HNA Group: HNA Industrial Group (Chinese: 海航实业集团) for CN¥1.3 billion, but paid by 100% stake of a subsidiary of HNA Industrial Group (Chinese: 广东兴华实业); The listed company was renamed to Hainan HNA Infrastructure Investment Group Co., Ltd. in late 2015; in July 2016 HNA Infrastructure Investment Group reverse takeover HNA Infrastructure Group was completed. On 2 November 2016 HNA Industrial Group acquired 1 million number of shares from the public market, making HNA Industrial Group owned 60.84% shares directly and indirectly.

In 2014 Hainan Island Construction issued a 5-year bond with 8.5% p.a. yield for CN¥300 million, which was guaranteed by HNA Airport Holdings.

=== HNA Infrastructure Group ===
HNA Infrastructure Group (Chinese: 海航基础产业集团) was incorporated on 24 November 2011 as a first tier subsidiary of HNA Group. In 2012 sister company HNA Capital subscribed the capital increase for CN¥300 million; in the same year HNA Airport Group was absorbed as a subsidiary of HNA Infrastructure Group. In 2013 Tianjin Trust subscribed the capital increase for CN¥2.2 billion, as well as Bohai Trust for CN¥446 million; in the same year another sister company Hainan International Tourism Island (Chinese: 海航国际旅游岛开发建设(集团)) was absorbed as subsidiary, making HNA Infrastructure Group was the indirect largest shareholder of listed company Hainan Island Construction. In 2015, the minority stake of HNA Infrastructure Group were acquired by sister company HNA Industrial Group (Chinese: 海航实业集团) from HNA Capital, Tianjin Trust and Bohai Trust for CN¥360 million, CN¥2.798 billion and CN¥562 million respectively. On 31 August 2015, HNA Group sold the remain 81.03% stake of HNA Infrastructure Group to its subsidiary HNA Industrial Group for CN¥12.58 billion; on the same day the 30.09% shares of the listed company Hainan Island Construction were also transferred from HNA Infrastructure Group to HNA Industrial Group, making both HNA Infrastructure Group and Hainan Island Construction were second-tier subsidiary of HNA Group and first-tier subsidiary of HNA Industrial Group. However, in the same year the entire share capital of HNA Infrastructure Group were transferred to another sister company Hainan HNA Infrastructure Holding (Chinese: 海南海航基础控股; later renamed to HNA Infrastructure Holding Group (Chinese: 海航基础控股集团)). In July 2016, a reverse takeover of HNA Infrastructure Group by listed company HNA Infrastructure Investment Group (formerly Hainan Island Construction) was completed.

In 2015 HNA Infrastructure Group issued a 7-year bond with 7.5% p.a yield for CN¥1.5 billion, which would be used in the construction of Nanhai Pearl Artificial Island.

== Subsidiaries ==
As of 31 December 2015

- HNA Infrastructure Group (100%)
  - HNA Airport Group (86.48%)
    - Weifang Nanyuan Airport (100%)
    - Manzhouli Airport Asset Management (67.00%)
    - Tangshan Sannühe Airport Management (67.00%)
    - Yingkou Airport (60.00%)
    - Anqing Tianzhushan Airport (100%)
    - HNA Airport Holdings (50.20%)
      - Sanya Phoenix International Airport (72.49%)
      - Yichang Sanxia Airport (90.00%)
      - Manzhouli Xijiao Airport (67.00%)
  - Hainan International Tourism Island Development and Construction Group (100%)

== Associate companies ==
- Haikou Meilan International Airport Co., Ltd. (19.58% via HNA Airport Group; additional stake held by another subsidiary of HNA Group)
  - HNA Infrastructure (50.19%)
  - Hainan Airlines (7.08%, additional stake held by HNA Group and related company Grand China Air)
