= BITC =

BITC may refer to:

- Bitcoin, a cryptocurrency
- Burnt-in timecode, a human-readable on-screen version of the timecode information of a video stream
- Business in the Community, a United Kingdom organization promoting corporate responsibility
- Bohai International Trust Co., Ltd., Chinese trust company
