= Jiujiang Lushan Airport =

Jiujiang Lushan Airport 九江庐山机场
- IATA: JIU; ICAO: ZSJJ

Summary
- Serves: Jiujiang
- Location: Jiujiang, China
- Opened: 18 June 1998
- Elevation AMSL: 164 ft / 50 m
- Coordinates: 29°28′37″N 115°48′04″E

Map
- Location of airport in China

Runways
Direction	Length		Surface
Direction	m	ft	Surface
04/22	2,800	9,186

Statistics (2025)
- Passengers: 382,490
- Aircraft movements: 3,642
- Cargo (metric tons): 0.0

Jiujiang Lushan Airport
- Simplified Chinese: 九江庐山机场
- Traditional Chinese: 九江廬山機場
Transcriptions
Standard Mandarin
- Hanyu Pinyin: Jiǔjiāng Lúshān Jīchǎng

Jiujiang Lushan Airport (IATA: JIU, ICAO: ZSJJ) is an airport serving Jiujiang, a city in the province of Jiangxi in China. The airport began operations on June 18, 1998. All flights from the airport were suspended on March 21, 2015. The airport reopened on October 31, 2021.

== History ==
Jiujiang Airport (formerly known as Lushan Airport) was a military airport built with state investment. Construction began in July 1971 and it was completed and put into use in November 1983.

The inaugural flight took place on July 19, 1985, in Huizhou, Guangdong. On June 19, 1986, a round-trip route between Beijing, Jiujiang, and Huizhou was opened. On January 4, 1988, the airport was renamed Jiujiang Airport. In May 1990, a round-trip route between Nanjing, Shanghai, and Jiujiang was also opened.

On June 18, 1996, Jiujiang Airport was converted into a joint military-civilian airport, and its civil aviation name was "Jiujiang Lushan Airport". Shortly after its official opening as Jiujiang Lushan Airport, it was forced to close in October 1999 due to insufficient passenger traffic. In August 2002, the airport reopened under a lease agreement, but only two months later, on October 11, it closed again due to insufficient passenger traffic.

In December 2004, the Jiujiang Municipal Government transferred the airport to Jiangxi Airport Group Corporation for operation and management. After renovation and upgrading, Jiujiang Lushan Airport resumed operations on July 7, 2006. However, it was forced to close again on July 28 of the same month. It reopened on December 7, 2006, but closed again on March 21, 2015, for a complete renovation project.

In April 2016, Jiujiang government decided to carry out renovations and prepare for reopening of Jiujiang Lushan Airport. In May 2016, the operating license for Jiujiang Lushan Airport (JIU) was revoked by the Civil Aviation Administration of China.

The quality improvement project of Jiujiang Lushan Airport was basically completed in September 2021. On October 31, 2021, after years of upgrades and renovations and regaining its operating permit, the airport successfully resumed commercial flight operations. The renovated Jiujiang Lushan Airport has a runway that is 2,800 meters long and 50 meters wide, an apron area of 20,000 square meters, and three parking stands. It is a 4C-level flight zone, capable of accommodating mainstream large passenger aircraft such as the Boeing 737-800 and Airbus A320.

== Facilities ==
The airport has one runway which is 2,800 metres (9,186 ft) long.

== Airlines and destinations ==
Airlines	Destinations
Colorful Guizhou Airlines	Chengdu–Tianfu, Ningbo
Grand China Air	Beijing–Capital
Hainan Airlines	Haikou
Okay Airways	Shenzhen, Xi'an

== See also ==
- List of airports in China
