= Regal International Airport Group =

Chinese listed company

- Formerly: Hainan Meilan Airport; HNA Infrastructure
- Company type: public
Traded as
SEHK: 357	(H share)
unlisted	(A share)
- Industry: Transport
- Founded: 18 November 2000
- Headquarters: Meilan Airport, Haikou, Hainan, China
- Services: airport operator
- Revenue: ▲CN¥1.063 billion (2015)
- Operating income: ▲CN¥571 million (2015)
- Net income: ▲CN¥439 million (2015)
- Total assets: ▲CN¥6.962 billion (2015)
- Total equity: ▲CN¥3.230 billion (2015)
Owner
Haikou Meilan International Airport	(50.19%)
- Parent: Haikou Meilan International Airport
Subsidiaries
Meilan Airport Assets Management	(100%)
Meilan Airport Cargo	(51%)

Chinese name
- Simplified Chinese: 瑞港国际机场集团股份有限公司
- Traditional Chinese: 瑞港國際機場集團股份有限公司
Transcriptions

Second alternative Chinese name
- Simplified Chinese: 海航基础股份有限公司
- Traditional Chinese: 海航基礎股份有限公司
Transcriptions

Historical Chinese short name
- Chinese: 航基股份
Transcriptions

Second historical Chinese name
- Simplified Chinese: 海南美兰机场股份有限公司
- Traditional Chinese: 海南美蘭機場股份有限公司
- Literal meaning: Hainan Meilan Airport, Company Limited by Shares
Transcriptions
- Website: www.mlairport.com
- Footnotes / references in consolidated financial statement

Regal International Airport Group Co., Ltd. is a Chinese listed company based in Meilan Airport, Haikou. The company is 50.19% owned by Haikou Meilan International Airport Co., Ltd. (Chinese: 海口美兰国际机场有限责任公司), a company related to Hainan Airlines, Grand China Air, HNA Infrastructure Investment Group, HNA Group, Hainan Provincial People's Government and China Development Bank.

Regal International Airport Group was formerly known as HNA Infrastructure Co., Ltd. and Hainan Meilan Airport Co., Ltd. (Chinese: 海南美兰机场股份有限公司).

HNA Infrastructure is the operator of Haikou Meilan International Airport.

== History ==
On 30 December 2016 HNA Infrastructure announced a recapitalization and a plan to acquire the runway of Meilan Airport from the parent company in an all-share deal; sister company HNA Infrastructure Investment Group would be introduced as minority shareholder. In July 2017, it was announced that the company would develop the airport into an aviation hub and a duty-free shopping paradise.

On 9 July 2018, it was approved by the extraordinary general meeting that the company would renamed to Regal International Airport Group Co., Ltd. (Chinese: 瑞港国际机场集团股份有限公司).

== Subsidiaries ==
- Meilan Airport Assets Management (100%)
- Hainan Meilan International Airport Cargo (51%)

== Equity interests ==
- HNA Airport Holdings (24.5%) - a subsidiary of HNA Airport Group for 50.2% stake; HNA Airport Holdings owned Sanya Phoenix International Airport Co., Ltd.
- Haikou Decheng Industrial and Development (30%)

== Shareholders ==
As of 30 June 2016

- Haikou Meilan International Airport (50.19%)
- Oriental Patron Financial Group (19.94%)
- Pacific Alliance Asia Opportunity Fund (6.93%)
- UBS (5.78%)
- Deutsche Bank (3.84%)
- Greenwoods Asset Management (2.93%)
- JPMorgan Chase (2.88%)
- Handelsbanken (2.41%)
- general public (5.1%)

As at 13 October 2016, the shareholders of Haikou Meilan International Airport were HNA Airport Group, an indirect subsidiary of HNA Infrastructure Investment Group (19.58%), state-owned bank China Development Bank (18.88%), state-owned company Hainan Development Holdings (16.65%), a private company (Chinese: 海南航辉农业开发) (14.99%), a subsidiary of HNA Group (Chinese: 海南航旅交通服务) (11.9%), listed company Hainan Airlines (7.88%), another private company based in Yangpu (Chinese: 洋浦联海工贸) (4.78%), listed company China Southern Airlines (3.21%) and China National Aviation Fuel Supply (Chinese: 中国航空油料) a joint venture of China National Aviation Fuel Group, Sinopec Marketing and PetroChina Marketing (2.08%).

Haikou Meilan International Airport Co., Ltd. itself owned 7.08% shares of Hainan Airlines as the third largest shareholder as cross ownership. The largest shareholder of Hainan Airlines is Grand China Air for 35.34% shares, which HNA Group is the second largest shareholder of Grand China Air for 23.11% stake. (Haikou Meilan International Airport owned 8.30% stake of Grand China Air as the fourth largest shareholder) HNA Group owned 4.88% shares of Hainan Airlines directly and an additional 4.25% held by subsidiary Changjiang Leasing; the largest shareholder of Grand China Air was Hainan Development Holdings for 24.97% stake. Hainan Development Holdings is a wholly owned subsidiary of Hainan Provincial People's Government.
