= Changzhi Wangcun Airport =

Airport in Shanxi, China

Changzhi Wangcun Airport 长治王村机场
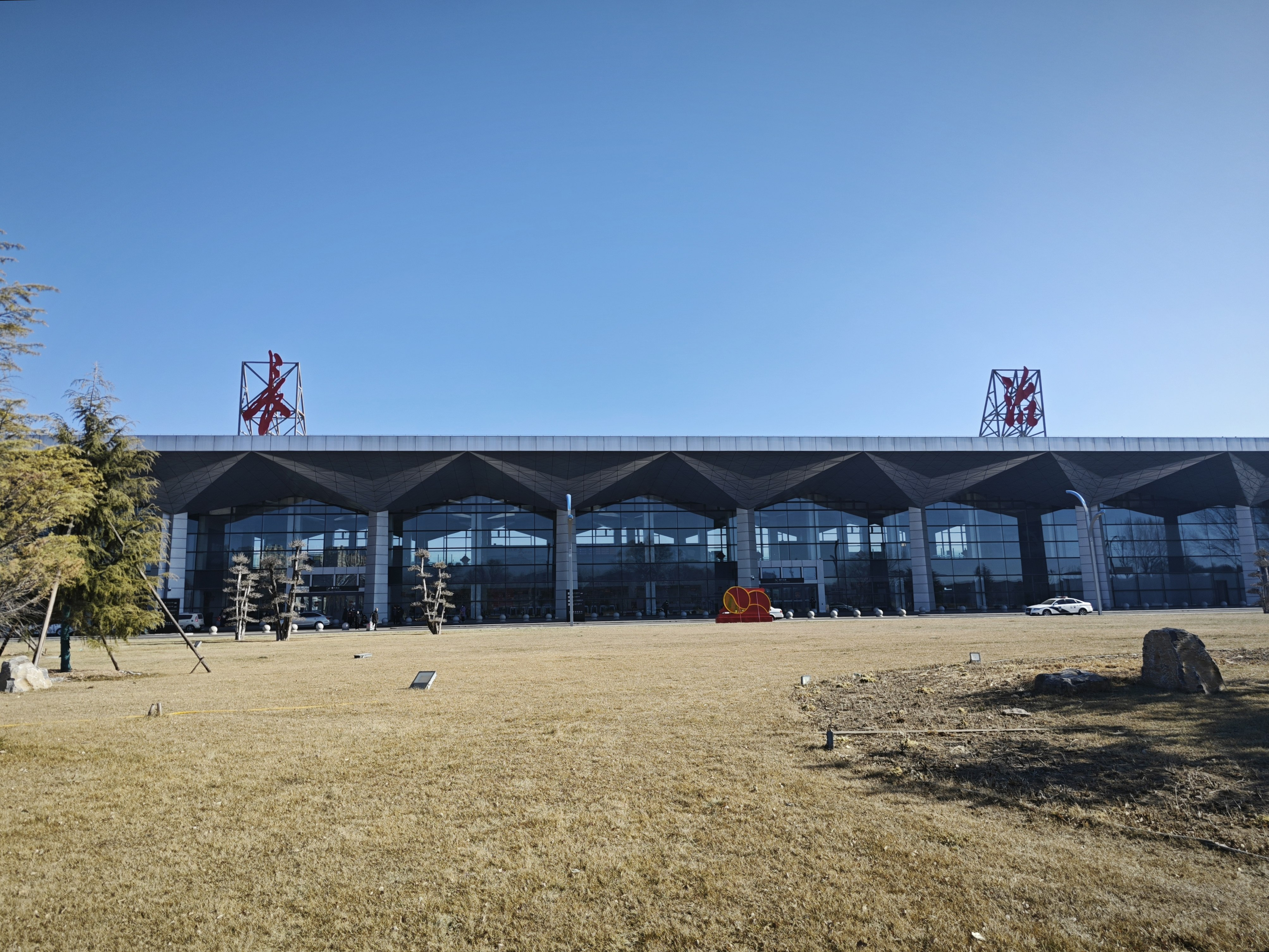
- IATA: CIH; ICAO: ZBCZ

Summary
- Airport type: Public
- Operator: Shanxi Civil Airport Group
- Serves: Changzhi, Shanxi, China
- Opened: 1958; 68 years ago
- Coordinates: 36°14′51″N 113°07′33.6″E

Map
- Location of airport in Shanxi

Runways
Direction	Length		Surface
Direction	m	ft	Surface
01/19	2,600	8,530	Concrete

Statistics (2025)
- Passengers: 850,987
- Aircraft movements: 9,722
- Cargo (metric tons): 2,003.9
- Source: CAAC

Changzhi Wangcun Airport
- Simplified Chinese: 长治王村机场
- Traditional Chinese: 長治王村機場
Transcriptions
Standard Mandarin
- Hanyu Pinyin: Chángzhì Wángcūn Jīchǎng

Changzhi Wangcun Airport (IATA: CIH, ICAO: ZBCZ) is an airport serving Changzhi, Shanxi, China.

== History ==
Changzhi Airport was initially built in 1958, expanded in March 1965, and completed in October 1966. In September 1969, with the approval of the State Council and the Central Military Commission, an air force unit moved in and expanded the airport according to military standards. On November 24, 1997, it was placed under the jurisdiction of the Civil Aviation Administration of Shanxi Province, with the establishment of the Changzhi Aviation Station.

In June 2000, due to runway weathering and outdated facilities, the airport was forced to close. On June 6, 2002, the Changzhi Airport Reopening and Renovation Project started. The project renovated the airport runway, navigation lights and terminal building, and was completed on December 25, 2002, and passed the completion acceptance of the Civil Aviation Administration of North China. On September 8, 2003, the airport reopened.

From 2004 to 2017, the airport successively installed the instrument landing system (ILS) and completed the apron expansion, navigation lighting renovation and terminal expansion projects. In April 2014, Changzhi Airport Co., Ltd. was registered and established, under the jurisdiction of Shanxi Aviation Industry Group Co., Ltd. In 2015, another renovation and expansion project of the terminal area was approved. The project budget was 368.21 million yuan. In March 2017, the project was officially started construction and was completed and put into use in December 2019.

The airport terminal area renovation and expansion project was launched in April 2019, with a total investment of 368 million yuan. It includes the expansion of the new terminal building by 14,613.2 square meters, the construction of a new 10,120-square-meter apron, 5 sets of jet bridges, 3 parking stands, etc. The new terminal building was put into trial operation on September 19, 2021. The renovation and expansion project of Changzhi Airport terminal area was designed to meet the needs of 1.5 million passenger throughput and 4,500 tons of cargo throughput by 2025.

In 2025, the airport's actual passenger throughput was only 850,987 and its cargo throughput was 2,003.9 metric tons, both far below the designed throughput.

== Airlines and destinations ==
Airlines	Destinations
Air China	Beijing–Capital
Air Guilin	Dalian
China Express Airlines	Chengdu–Tianfu, Chongqing, Dalian, Haikou, Hangzhou, Hohhot, Shenyang, Tianjin
China Southern Airlines	Guangzhou, Wuhan
Donghai Airlines	Beijing–Daxing, Kunming, Qingdao, Shenzhen
Fuzhou Airlines	Changchun, Fuzhou, Harbin
Juneyao Air	Shanghai–Pudong, Wuxi
LJ Air	Harbin, Zhuhai

== See also ==
- List of airports in China
