= Yulin Fumian Airport =

Yulin Fumian Airport 玉林福绵机场
- IATA: YLX; ICAO: ZGYL

Summary
- Airport type: Public
- Serves: Yulin, Guangxi, China
- Location: Shihe Town, Fumian District
- Elevation AMSL: 137 m / 449 ft
- Coordinates: 22°26′17″N 110°07′15″E

Map
- Location of airport in Guangxi

Runways
Direction	Length		Surface
Direction	m	ft	Surface
04/22	2,600	8,530	Concrete

Statistics (2021)
- Passengers: 363,941
- Aircraft movements: 4,587
- Cargo (metric tons): 30

Yulin Fumian Airport
- Simplified Chinese: 玉林福绵机场
- Traditional Chinese: 玉林福綿機場
Transcriptions
Standard Mandarin
- Hanyu Pinyin: Yùlín Fúmián Jīchǎng

Yulin Fumian Airport (IATA: YLX, ICAO: ZGYL) is an airport serving the city of Yulin in Guangxi Zhuang Autonomous Region in south China. It is located in Shihe Town (石和), Fumian District of Yulin.

The airport has a 2,600-metre (8,500 ft) runway (class 4C) and an 8,000-square-metre (86,000 sq ft) terminal building. It is designed to serve 740,000 passengers annually. The airport opened on August 28, 2020.

== Airlines and destinations ==
Airlines	Destinations
Hainan Airlines	Beijing–Capital
Juneyao Air	Shanghai–Pudong
Okay Airways	Hangzhou
Sichuan Airlines	Chengdu–Tianfu
Suparna Airlines	Shenzhen, Zhengzhou
Tianjin Airlines	Haikou, Xi'an

== See also ==
- List of airports in China
- List of the busiest airports in China
