= Guangyuan Panlong Airport =

Guangyuan Panlong Airport 广元盘龙机场
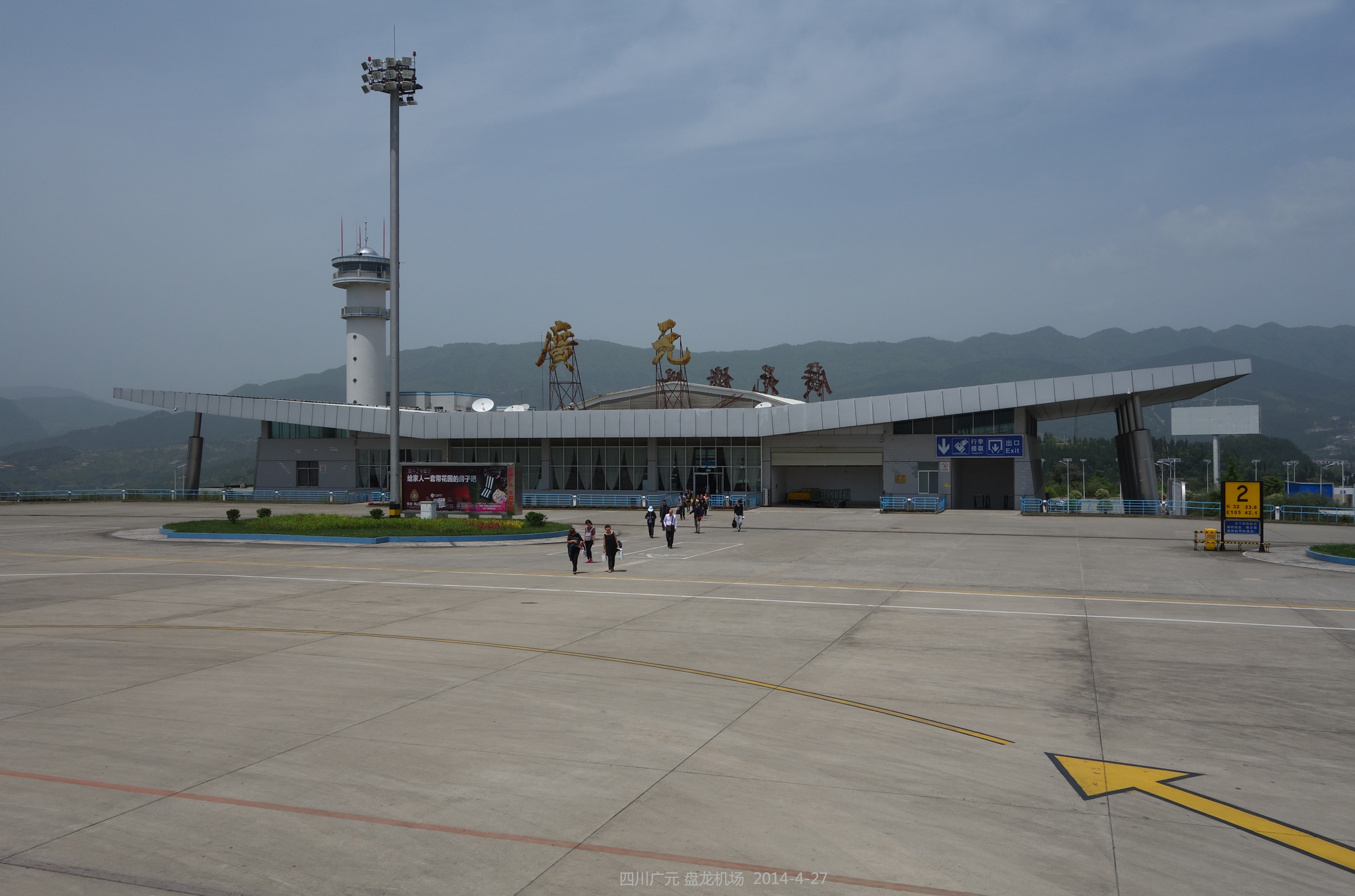
- IATA: GYS; ICAO: ZUGU

Summary
- Airport type: Public
- Serves: Guangyuan, Sichuan, China
- Coordinates: 32°23′28″N 105°42′07″E

Map
- Location of airport in Sichuan

Runways
Direction	Length		Surface
Direction	m	ft	Surface
08/26	2,500	8,202	Concrete

Statistics (2025)
- Passengers: 595,464
- Aircraft movements: 105,500
- Cargo (metric tons): 195.4
- Sources: GCM, STV

Guangyuan Panlong Airport
- Simplified Chinese: 广元盘龙机场
- Traditional Chinese: 廣元盘龙機場
Transcriptions
Standard Mandarin
- Hanyu Pinyin: Guǎngyuán Pánlóng Jīchǎng

Guangyuan Panlong Airport (IATA: GYS, ICAO: ZUGU) is an airport serving Guangyuan, Sichuan province, China.

== History ==
In July 1992, the Guangyuan Government decided to build a new airport in Panlong Town, Lizhou District, Guangyuan City (about 14 kilometers from the city center). Construction officially began in February 1994, with a total investment of 460 million yuan. After six years, the airport was completed and put into operation in September 2000.

Guangzhou Panlong International Airport suffered heavy losses and was forced to close at the end of 2004.

In the devastating "5.12" Wenchuan earthquake, Guangyuan Airport suffered severe damage to its facilities. On May 8, 2009, after an additional investment of approximately 48 million RMB for airport renovation and reconstruction, the airport officially reopened after a five-year closure. The first route after reopening was a flight to and from Beijing.

== Airlines and destinations ==
Airlines	Destinations
Air China	Beijing–Capital, Guangzhou, Hangzhou
Beijing Capital Airlines	Haikou, Shijiazhuang
China Express Airlines	Guiyang, Zhengzhou
China Southern Airlines	Shenzhen
Loong Air	Ningbo
Sichuan Airlines	Jinan, Kunming, Nanning, Urumqi
Spring Airlines	Shanghai–Pudong
Tibet Airlines	Changsha, Dali, Hefei, Lhasa, Nanjing

== See also ==
- List of airports in China
