= Tangshan Sannühe Airport =

Airport in Hebei, north China

Tangshan Sannühe Airport 唐山三女河机场
- IATA: TVS; ICAO: ZBSN

Summary
- Airport type: Public / military
- Operator: HNA Infrastructure Investment Group
- Location: Tangshan, Hebei, China
- Opened: 13 July 2010; 16 years ago
- Coordinates: 39°43′31″N 117°59′36″E
- Website: www.tangshanairport.com

Map
- Location of airport in Hebei

Runways
Direction	Length		Surface
Direction	m	ft	Surface
10/28	2,700	8,858	Concrete

Statistics (2025)
- Passengers: 653,045
- Aircraft movements: 5,450
- Cargo (metric tons): 564.9

Tangshan Sannühe Airport
- Simplified Chinese: 唐山三女河机场
- Traditional Chinese: 唐山三女河機場
Transcriptions
Standard Mandarin
- Hanyu Pinyin: Tángshān Sānnǚhé Jīchǎng

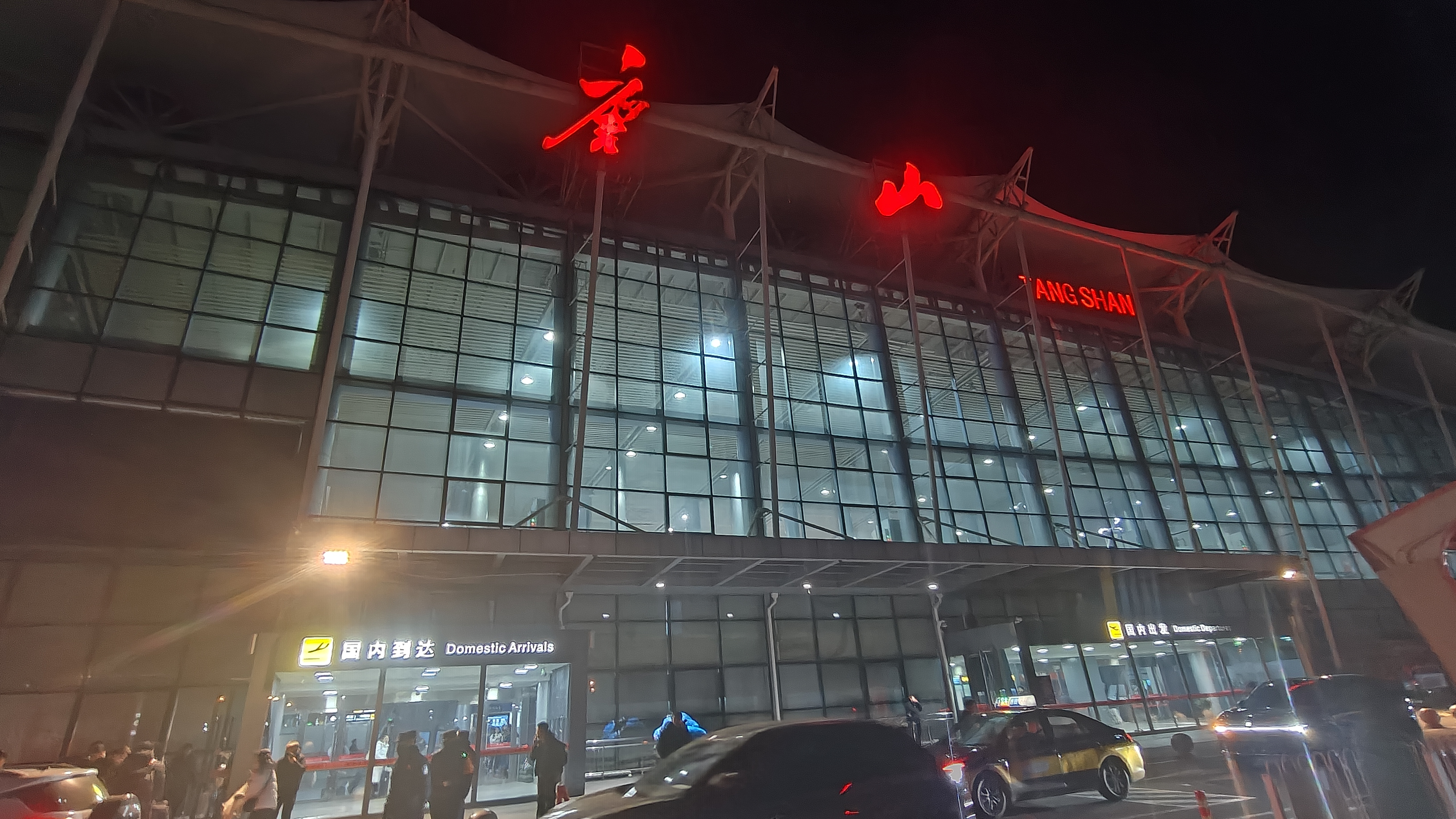
Tangshan Sannühe Airport

Tangshan Sannvhe Airport or Tangshan Sannühe Airport (IATA: TVS, ICAO: ZBSN), or Tangshan Air Base, is a dual-use military and civil airport serving the city of Tangshan in Hebei province, north China. It is located near the village of Sannühe, 20 kilometers from the city center in Fengrun District. The airport was opened on 13 July 2010.

== History ==
In April 2007, the Tangshan Municipal Party Committee and Government established an airport construction command center and submitted a construction application to the State Council. Approval was granted in December 2008, and construction officially commenced on February 26, 2009.

On June 18, 2009, Tangshan Sannühe Airport successfully completed its test flight. On June 19, 2010, the airport passed the civil aviation authority's inspection. On July 13, 2010, the airport officially opened for civil aviation operations, with the first route operated by Hebei Airlines.

Tangshan Sannühe Airport was temporarily closed on March 31, 2019 for runway maintenance. It was expected to reopen on May 19. The project took a little longer than expected, and the airport resumed operations on May 27, 2019.

On November 8, 2022, the Civil Aviation Administration of China North China Regional Administration approved the construction of Terminal 2 at Tangshan Sannühe Airport, which is expected to be completed in 2027.

Tangshan Sannühe Airport temporarily closed its runways for maintenance again from October 10 to 21, 2023, and all flights were suspended.

== Airlines and destinations ==
Airlines	Destinations
Air Chang'an	Dalian, Xi'an
Air Guilin	Chongqing, Guilin, Haikou
Beijing Capital Airlines	Hangzhou
China Eastern Airlines	Hangzhou
China Express Airlines	Chengdu–Tianfu
Hainan Airlines	Changsha
Ruili Airlines	Chengdu–Tianfu, Harbin, Kunming
Shanghai Airlines	Shanghai–Pudong
Tianjin Airlines	Dalian, Yinchuan

== See also ==
- List of airports in China
- List of the busiest airports in China
- List of People's Liberation Army Air Force airbases
