= Haikou Meilan International Airport =

Airport serving Haikou, Hainan, China

Haikou Meilan International Airport 海口美兰国际机场

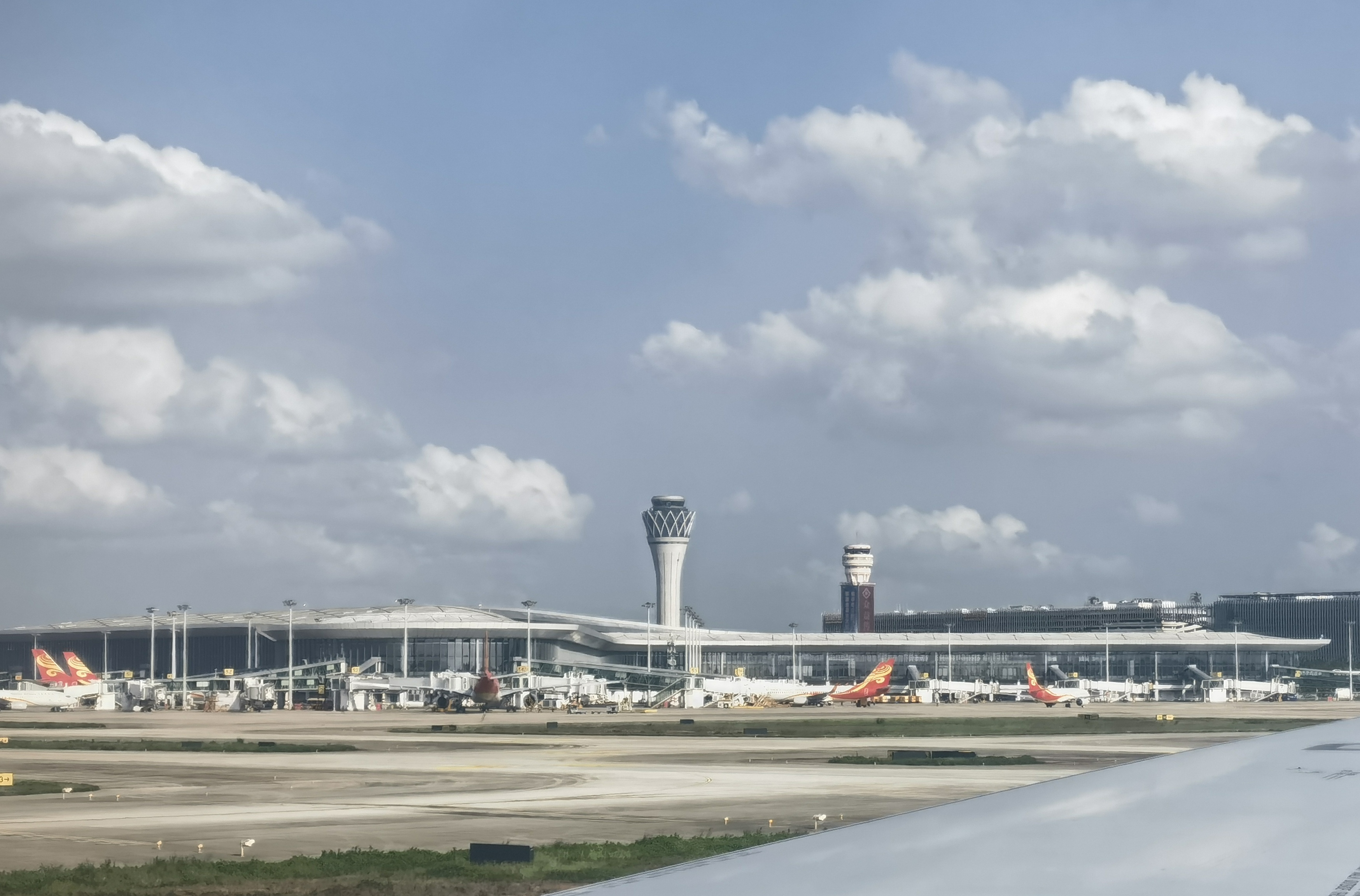
- Terminal 2 in May 2023
- IATA: HAK; ICAO: ZJHK

Summary
- Airport type: Public
- Owner/Operator: Haikou Meilan International Airport
- Serves: Haikou
- Location: Lingshan Town, Meilan District, Haikou, Hainan, China
- Opened: 25 May 1999; 27 years ago
- Hub for: Hainan Airlines; Tianjin Airlines
- Elevation AMSL: 23 m (75 ft)
- Coordinates: 19°56′05″N 110°27′32″E
- Website: www.mlairport.com

Maps
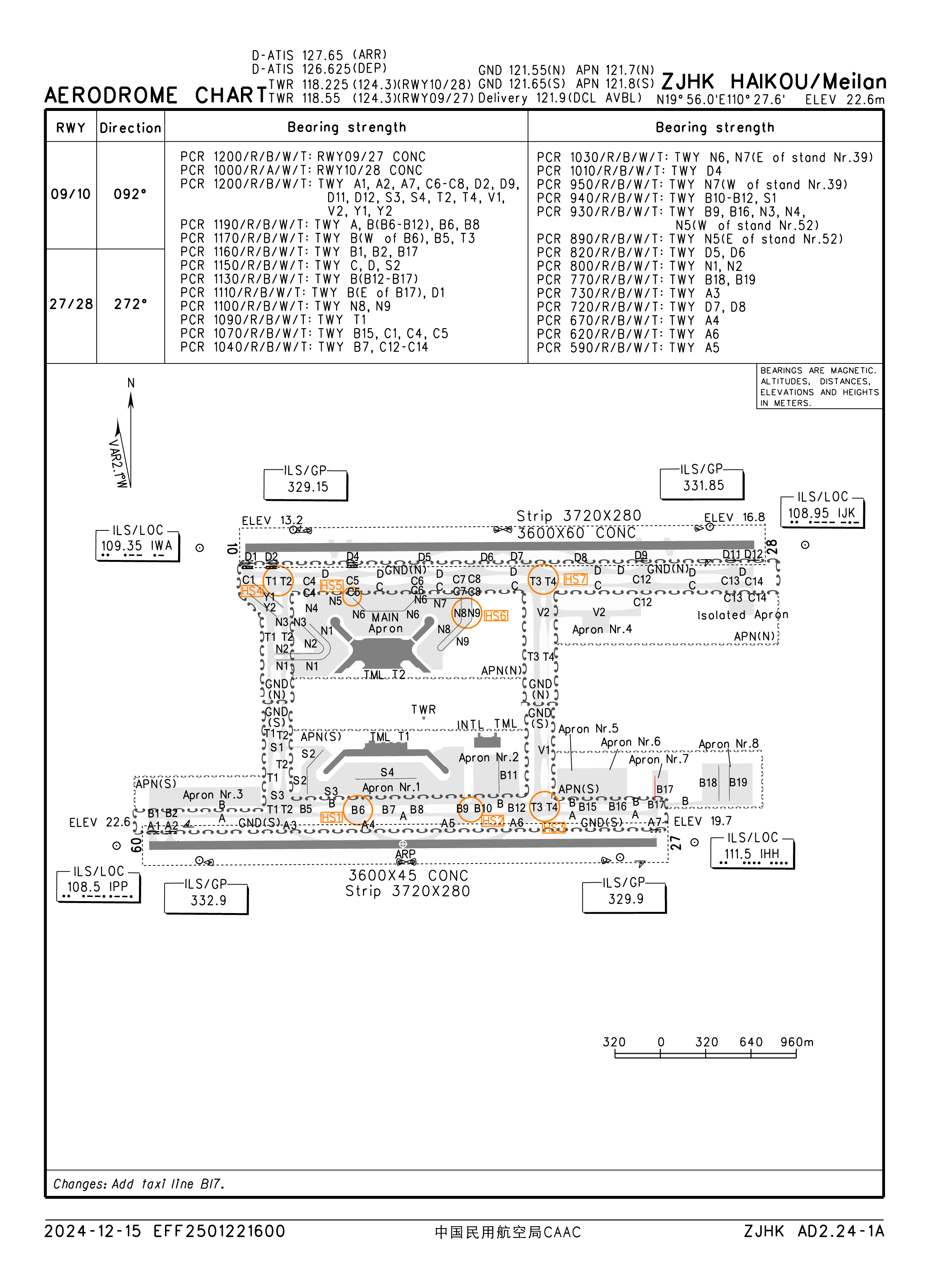
- CAAC airport chart

- Location in Hainan Location in China

Runways
Direction	Length		Surface
Direction	m	ft	Surface
09/27	3,600	11,811	Concrete
10/28	3,600	11,811	Concrete

Statistics (2025)
- Passengers: 26,851,102
- Cargo (tonnes): 215,752.3
- Aircraft movement: 185,220
- Source: China's busiest airports by passenger traffic

Haikou Meilan International Airport
- Traditional Chinese: 海口美蘭國際機場
- Simplified Chinese: 海口美兰国际机场
Transcriptions
Standard Mandarin
- Hanyu Pinyin: Hǎikǒu Měilán Guójì Jīchǎng
- Wade–Giles: Hai-kʻou Mei-lan Kuo-chi-chi-chang
Yue: Cantonese
- Jyutping: hoi^{2}hau^{2} mei^{5}laan^{4} gwok^{3}zai^{3} gei^{1}coeng^{4}

Haikou Meilan International Airport (IATA: HAK, ICAO: ZJHK) is an international airport serving Haikou, the capital of South Central China's Hainan province. It is located 25 km (16 mi) southeast of the city center and was opened in 1999, replacing the old Dayingshan Airport located along what is now the city's Guoxing Avenue. The airport is operated by Hainan Meilan International Airport Company Limited.

Haikou Meilan International Airport is the largest and busiest airport in Hainan. In 2025, the passenger throughput was 26,851,102, ranking 20th among China's civil airports. The cargo throughput reached about 215,752.3 tons, ranking 19th; aircraft movement was about 185,220, ranking 22nd.

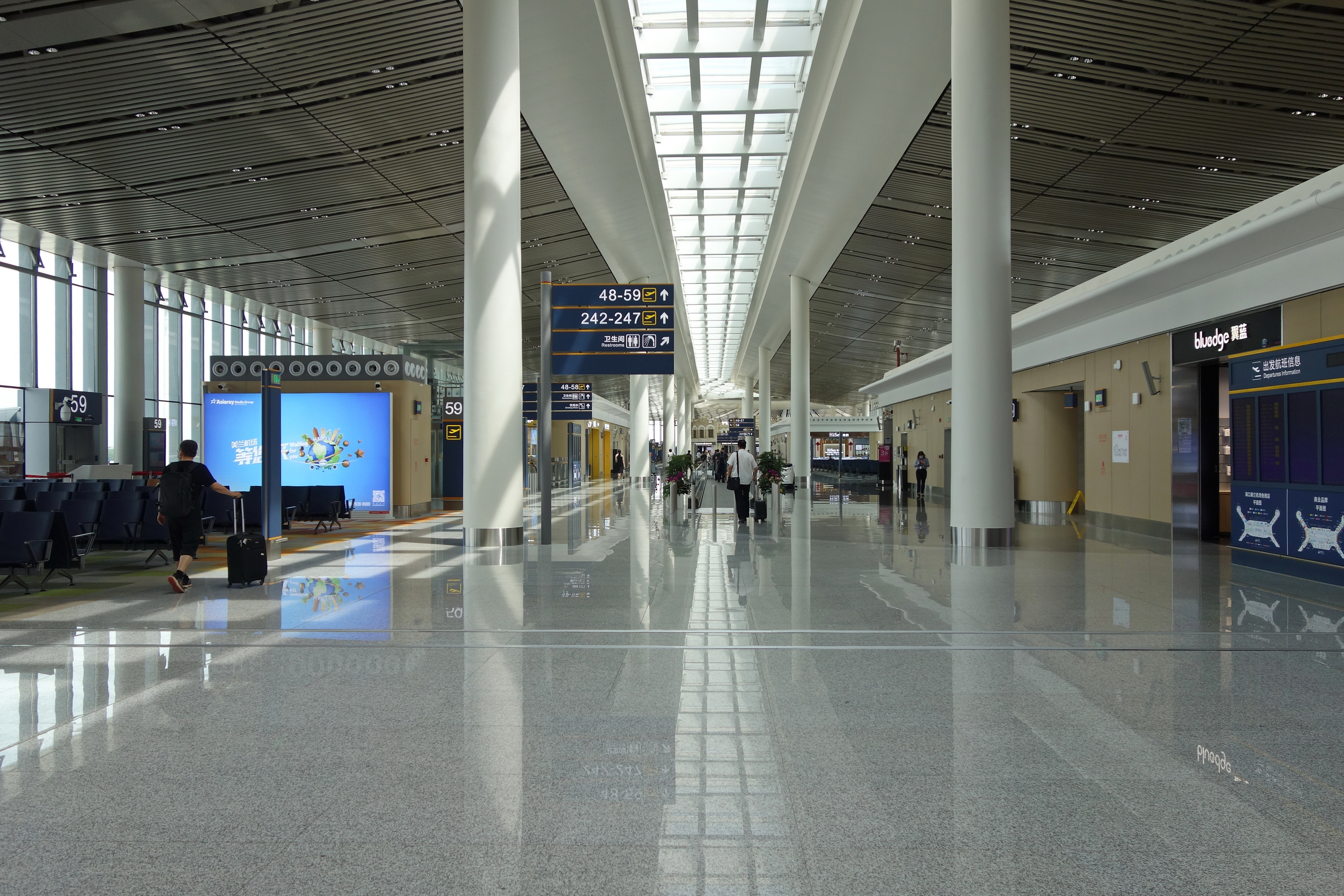
Terminal 2 interior

== Construction process ==
=== Initial construction ===
Hainan Province was established in 1988. As Haikou City is seat of the new province, its development plan is put on the agenda. At that time, Haikou Dayingshan Airport could not be expanded because it was located in the city center and could not meet future needs. On the other hand, it also severely restricts the development and construction of Haikou. The construction of a new airport became a major issue of priority at the time.

In 1993, the State Council and the Central Military Commission agreed to establish a project to build Meilan Airport. In May 1996, the State Planning Commission approved the airport project budget, and construction started in November of the same year.

Passed the national inspection and acceptance in March 1999. On May 13 of the same year, the Civil Aviation Administration of China issued a reply for the opening of Meilan Airport, and it was officially put into operation on the 25th.

After the completion of the airport, in order to meet the increasing demand of passengers, the east/west side corridors of the T1 terminal were expanded in 2002 and 2014 respectively. The terminal building was expanded in 2003. After the expansion, the terminal area reached 102,000 square meters, with a design capacity of 9.3 million passengers per year, 135,000 tons of cargo and mail, and 50,000 flights. The international terminal was also put into use in 2014, and the aviation tourism city/transportation center and the new airport hotel were also put into use in 2018.

The airport terminal has 60,200 square metres of space, with 45 check-in counters and 11 security checkpoints. The airport is staffed by 565 employees.

A new international terminal opened on August 14, 2013. Situated at the east side of the existing terminal, this new apron increases international capacity to ten flights, from the previous capacity of three. Construction of this new terminal began on April 18, 2011.

=== Second phase ===
In order to meet the increasing passenger flow demand, the second phase of the project was launched in 2016.

The second phase expanded the airport to the north and included:

- A new 3600m x 60m runway (numbered 10/28), suitable for A380 aircraft, with two parallel taxiways
- A Cat III ILS (instrument landing system)
- A new terminal (numbered terminal 2) approximately double the size of terminal 1

The new terminal opened on 2 December 2021. Flights HU7181 to Beijing and CZ6444 to Shenzhen took off simultaneously to mark the occasion. The international section of the new terminal opened on 7 February 2023, replacing the original international terminal to the east of terminal 1.

=== Third phase ===
In 2023, the Department of Transportation of the Hainan Provincial Government announced plans for a third phase of development for the airport, including a third terminal. Goals included continuing to build the airport's route network, building up supporting industries around the airport and increasing the airport's capacity to 40 flights per hour.

In 2025, a tender was issued to investigate the feasibility of this expansion, including:

- a new southern runway (3600x45m, category E) and associated taxiways
- a new Terminal 3 (450,000m^{2})
- renovation of the existing terminal area, including Terminal 2 and the cargo apron

== Facilities ==
=== Terminal 1 ===
Terminal 1 covers an area of approximately 150,000 square meters and serves the remaining domestic flights not accommodated by Terminal 2. It is built in a U shape, with 76 check-in counters, 28 jetbridge gates (numbered 01-28) and 13 bus gates (numbered 211-223). Level 1 serves arrivals, while Level 2 serves departures.

=== Terminal 2 ===
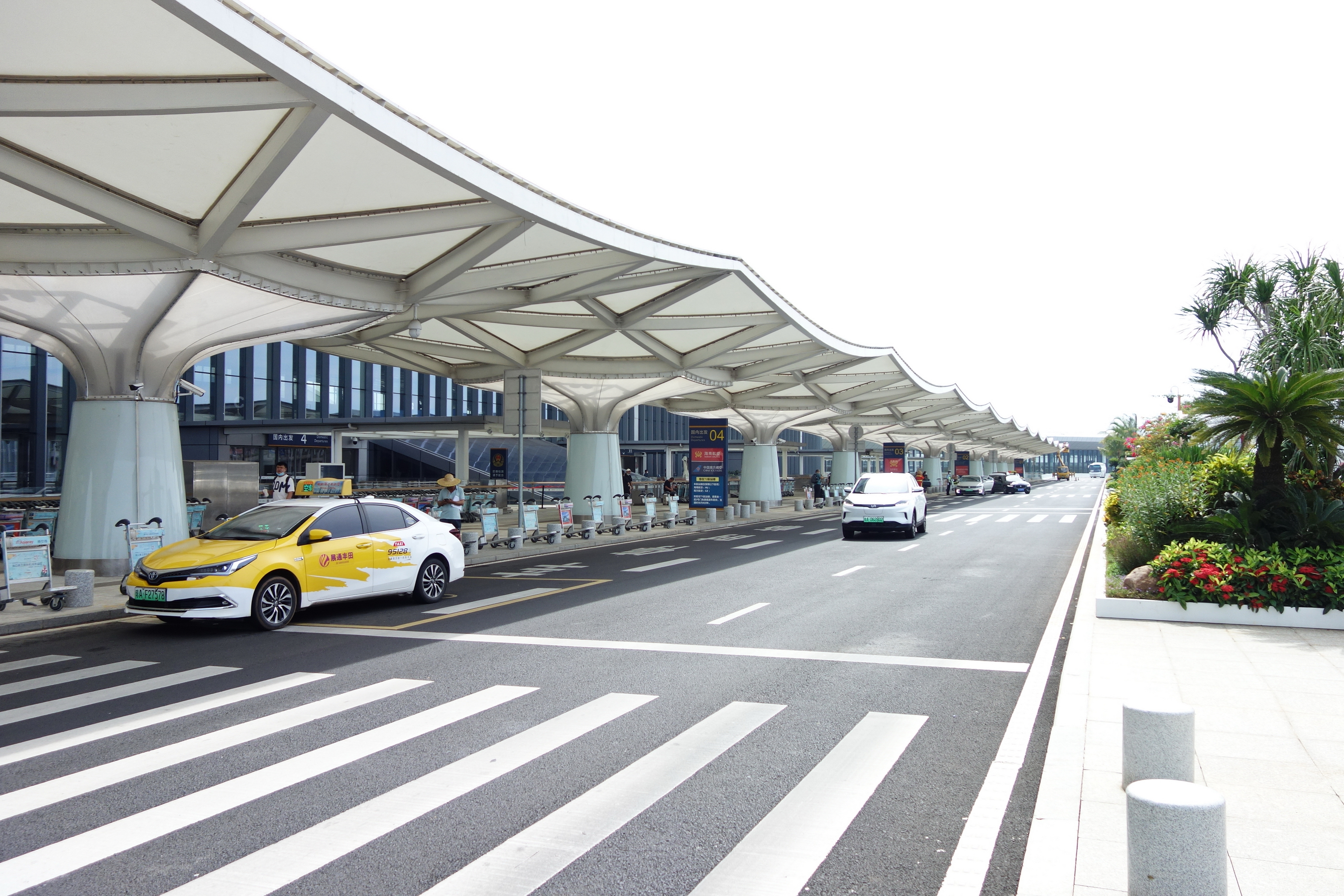
Exterior of Terminal 2

Terminal 2 covers an area of 296,000 square meters and serves all international flights, as well as mainly China Southern and Hainan domestic flights. There are five islands of check-in counters, with A and B dedicated to international flights. Hainan uses islands B and C, with other islands using the others. This terminal is built in a H shape, with two more piers compared to Terminal 1. The central gates are swing gates, mainly used for international flights, but can be turned into domestic gates when needed.

The terminal has four levels:

- 1F: Arrivals immigration and customs, transit security, baggage claim, bus gates
- 2F: Arrivals gates
- 3F: Check-in hall, domestic security, departures gates
- 4F: Departures immigration and customs, international security, lounges

=== International Terminal ===
The International Terminal covered an area of 13,200 square meters and had no jetbridges. It was closed when new immigration facilities in terminal 2 opened on 7 February 2023.

=== Apron ===
The apron of Terminal 1 of the airport is designed according to the 4E standard. There is a 3600mx45m runway with a PCN value of 95/R/B/W/T. The runway 09 is equipped with a Category II instrument landing system, and the runway 27 is equipped with a Category I instrument landing system. There are also two taxiways of 3600mx23m and corresponding connecting taxiways. The area is 790,000 square meters, with 78 stands (5 D-grade stands, 8 E-grade stands, and the rest are C-grade stands). The second phase of the newly built flight area has a grade index of 4F, and a new runway with a length of 3,600 meters, two parallel taxiways and a connecting road system will be built. After completion, Meilan Airport will form two flight zones in the south and north, with the flight zone levels being 4E and 4F respectively.

=== Other facilities ===
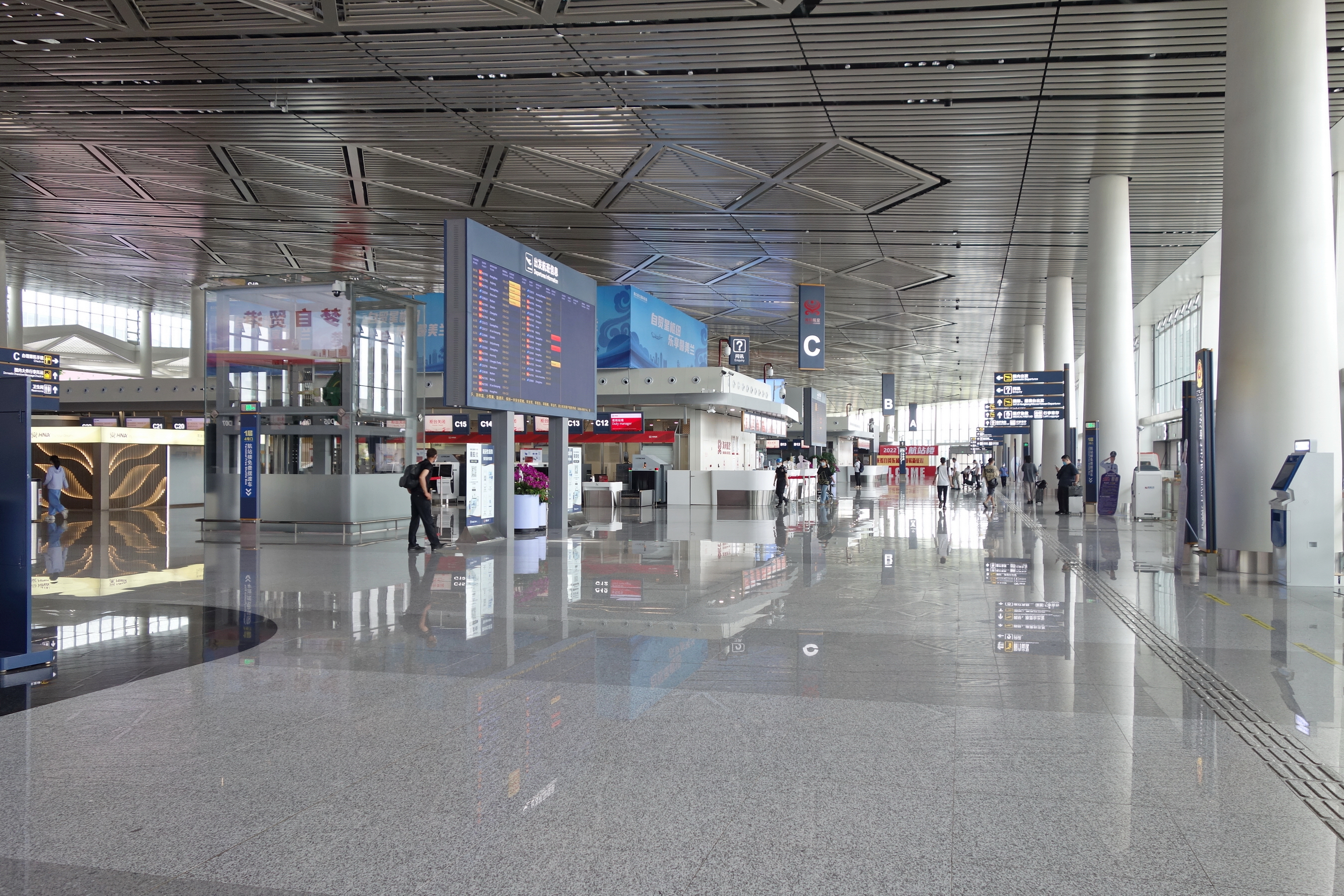
Terminal 2 departure hall

The ground transportation is located on the north side of Terminal 1, with a construction area of 322,300 square meters, including a hotel building with a construction area of 99,000 square meters, a commercial parking building with a construction area of 223,300 square meters, and 1040 hotel rooms. There are about 5000 parking spaces for motor vehicles (including open-air parking lots).

Both Hainan Airlines and China Southern Airlines have bases and maintenance depots at Meilan Airport. The maintenance warehouse can meet the maintenance requirements of Boeing 787 and Airbus A330 and lower aircraft.

== Airlines and destinations ==
=== Passenger ===
Airlines	Destinations
9 Air	Changchun, Changsha, Chengdu–Tianfu, Guangzhou, Guiyang, Jiayuguan, Kota Kinabalu, Kuching, Lanzhou, Luang Prabang, Penang, Shanghai–Pudong, Vientiane, Zhengzhou
Air Busan	Busan
Air Cambodia	Phnom Penh
Air Chang'an	Bazhong, Kaili, Xi'an, Yongzhou
Air China	Beijing–Capital, Beijing–Daxing, Chengdu–Shuangliu, Chengdu–Tianfu, Chongqing, Dalian, Hangzhou, Hohhot, Shanghai–Pudong, Tianjin, Wuhan
Air Guilin	Guilin, Guiyang, Lanzhou, Linyi, Shenyang, Taiyuan, Tangshan, Tongren, Wuhu, Xinzhou, Xishuangbanna, Xuzhou, Zhengzhou
Batik Air Malaysia	Kuala Lumpur–International
Beijing Capital Airlines	Beijing–Daxing, Bozhou, Changchun, Changsha, Chengdu–Tianfu, Chenzhou, Chifeng, Chongqing, Enshi, Guangyuan, Guilin, Hangzhou, Harbin, Heze, Hohhot, Jieyang, Jinan, Linyi, Nanchang, Nanjing, Nanning, Qingdao, Shaoguan, Shenyang, Shijiazhuang, Shiyan, Taiyuan, Taizhou, Wuhan, Xi'an, Xining, Yichang, Yinchuan, Yining, Yueyang, Zhangjiakou, Zhengzhou
Cambodia Airways	Phnom Penh
Cathay Pacific	Hong Kong
Chengdu Airlines	Chengdu–Shuangliu, Hangzhou, Yancheng
China Airlines	Taipei–Taoyuan
China Eastern Airlines	Beijing–Daxing, Chengdu–Tianfu, Lanzhou, Nanchang, Shanghai–Pudong, Wuhan, Xi'an
China Express Airlines	Baotou, Changzhi, Hohhot, Quzhou
China Southern Airlines	Beijing–Daxing, Changchun, Changsha, Chengdu–Tianfu, Chongqing, Dalian, Guangzhou, Guiyang, Hangzhou, Harbin, Jieyang, Kunming, Lanzhou, Nanjing, Nanning, Shanghai–Pudong, Shenyang, Shenzhen, Tianjin, Ürümqi, Wuhan, Xiamen, Yiwu, Zhengzhou, Zhuhai
China United Airlines	Beijing–Daxing, Wenzhou
Chongqing Airlines	Chongqing
Colorful Guizhou Airlines	Yibin
Donghai Airlines	Changsha, Nantong, Shenzhen, Wuxi, Zhuhai
Firefly	Johor Bahru, Penang
Fuzhou Airlines	Fuzhou, Harbin, Nanjing, Xiamen
GX Airlines	Bengbu, Handan, Harbin, Huai'an, Jinan, Lanzhou, Lianyungang, Luoyang, Nanning, Nanyang, Qingyang, Shangrao, Xinyang, Xuzhou, Yulin (Shaanxi), Zhangjiajie, Zhuhai
Hainan Airlines	Abu Dhabi, Ankang, Auckland, Bangkok–Suvarnabhumi, Beijing–Capital, Changchun, Changsha, Chengdu–Tianfu, Chongqing, Dalian, Dubai–International, Fuzhou, Guangzhou, Guiyang, Hangzhou, Harbin, Hefei, Hengyang, Ho Chi Minh City, Hohhot, Hong Kong, Jakarta–Soekarno-Hatta, Jeddah, Jieyang, Jinan, Jingzhou, Jiujiang, Kuala Lumpur–International, Kunming, Lanzhou, Liuzhou, London–Heathrow,, Longnan, Madrid, Melbourne, Moscow–Sheremetyevo, Nanchang, Nanjing, Nanning, Ningbo, Penang, Qianjiang, Qingdao, Quanzhou, Sansha–Yongxing, Seattle/Tacoma Seoul–Incheon, Shanghai–Hongqiao, Shanghai–Pudong, Shaoyang, Shenyang, Shenzhen, Surabaya, Singapore, Sydney–Kingsford Smith, Taiyuan, Tianjin, Tokyo–Narita, Ürümqi, Vientiane, Wenzhou, Wuhan, Xiamen, Xi'an, Xining, Xingtai, Yichang, Yinchuan, Zhengzhou, Zhuhai
Hebei Airlines	Shijiazhuang
Hong Kong Airlines	Hong Kong
Jiangxi Air	Nanchang, Shenyang
Juneyao Air	Hangzhou, Nanjing, Shanghai–Hongqiao, Shanghai–Pudong, Wuxi
Kunming Airlines	Kunming
LJ Air	Harbin, Ordos
Loong Air	Changchun, Harbin, Jiaxing, Xiangyang, Xuzhou
Lucky Air	Chengdu–Tianfu, Ganzhou, Hangzhou, Harbin, Kunming
Okay Airways	Chongqing, Xingyi, Yinchuan
Qingdao Airlines	Changchun, Nanjing, Weifang
SCAT Airlines	Almaty
Scoot	Singapore
Shandong Airlines	Changsha, Guilin, Jinan, Ningbo, Qingdao, Quzhou, Taizhou, Zhengzhou, Zhuhai
Shanghai Airlines	Jinggangshan, Shanghai–Hongqiao, Shanghai–Pudong
Shenzhen Airlines	Changzhou, Chengdu–Tianfu, Harbin, Nanchang, Nanjing, Shenyang, Shenzhen, Yuncheng, Zhengzhou
Sichuan Airlines	Chengdu–Shuangliu, Chongqing, Harbin, Tianjin, Xi'an, Xichang
Spring Airlines	Jieyang
Suparna Airlines	Guiyang, Mianyang, Shanghai–Pudong, Zhengzhou
Thai VietJet Air	Bangkok–Suvarnabhumi
Tianjin Airlines	Changde, Dalian, Guiyang, Hailar, Hangzhou, Hechi, Hengyang, Hohhot, Huaihua, Huizhou, Jieyang, Jinan, Kunming, Lanzhou, Liuzhou, Luliang,, Nanning, Qingdao, Tianjin, Ürümqi, Wenzhou, Wuhan, Xiamen, Xi'an, Yangzhou, Yichang, Yueyang, Yulin (Guangxi), Zhengzhou, Zhuhai, Zunyi–Maotai, Zunyi–Xinzhou
Urumqi Air	Fuyang, Mianyang, Ürümqi, Yinchuan
Vietnam Airlines	Hanoi, Ho Chi Minh City
West Air	Chongqing, Dalian, Xiangxi, Zhengzhou
XiamenAir	Beijing–Daxing, Changsha, Fuzhou, Hangzhou, Harbin, Quanzhou, Tianjin, Xiamen

=== Cargo ===
Airlines	Destinations
AirZeta	Seoul–Incheon

== Ground transportation ==
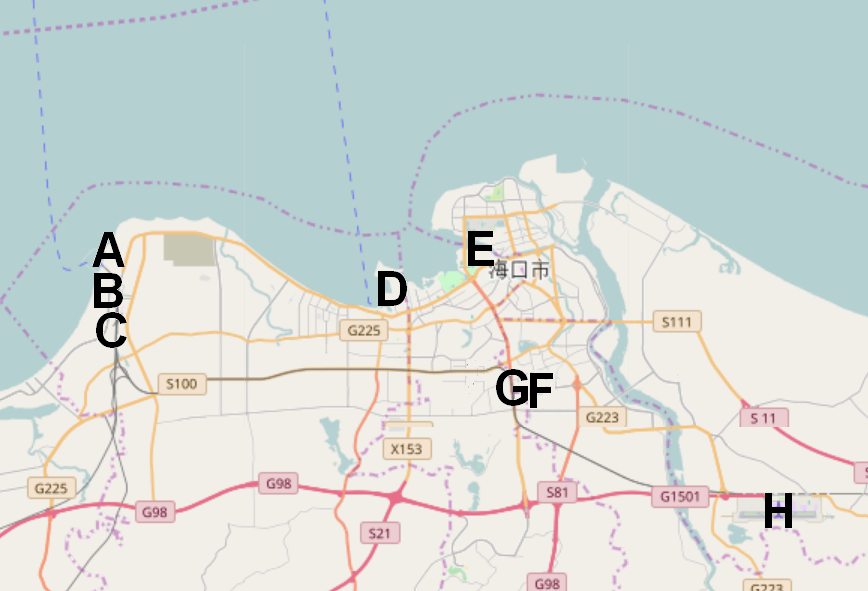
Main transportation hubs in Haikou: A: Haikou Port New Seaport; B: South Port; C: Haikou Railway Station; D: Haikou Xiuying Port; E: Haikou New Port; F: Haikou Transportation Center (main bus station); G: Haikou East Railway Station; H: Haikou Meilan International Airport

=== Highway ===
At present, there are national highway G223 and S82 airport connecting expressway connecting the urban area and the airport, and the provincial highway S201 to the west connects the airport with Guilinyang and the towns along the way.

=== Railway ===
Hainan Island High-speed Rail Meilan Station is located on the basement level of the Meilan Airport terminal. From here, you can take the city area train (the train number starts with S) and the round-the-island high-speed rail intercity train (the train number starts with C) to the downtown area of Haikou. Intercity trains in some counties and cities in Hainan Province, including Sanya City.

High-speed rail:

- East Loop Line: Haikou East Station-Meilan Station-Wenchang Station-Qionghai Station-Boao Station-Wanning Station-Shenzhou Station-Lingshui Station-Yalong Bay Station-Sanya Station
- West Loop Line: Haikou Station-Laocheng Town Station-Fushan Town Station-Lingao South Station-Yintan Station-Baimajing Station-Qiziwan Station-Dongfang Station-Jinyue Bay-Jianfeng Station-Huangliu Station-Ledong Station-Ya Zhou Station-Phoenix Airport Station-Sanya Station

City train:

- Meilan Station → Haikou East Station → Chengxi Station → Xiuying Station → Changliu Station → Haikou Station
- Haikou Station → Changliu Station → Xiuying Station → Chengxi Station → Haikou East Station → Meilan Station

=== Taxi ===
Getting to the airport from Haikou city by taxi usually costs about RMB 60 and takes about 30 minutes.

=== Buses ===
There are 5 lines running between the urban area, Guilinyang University Park and the airport. Route 21: To Baishamen Park, charge by section. min ¥1, max ¥5, Route 41: To Haikou Port, charge by section. min ¥1, max ¥6. (There is also an express route for min ¥2), Route K4: To Baishamen Park, it is an express route, and the fare is divided. min ¥3, max ¥6, Route 218: to Guilinyang Tropical Agricultural Park, tolls are to be paid in sections. min ¥2, and max is ¥6, Route 219: to Guilin Yangtze University District, charge by section. min ¥2, max ¥6.

== See also ==
- List of airports in China
- China's busiest airports by passenger traffic
