= Heze Mudan Airport =

Heze Mudan Airport 菏泽牡丹机场
- IATA: HZA; ICAO: ZSHZ

Summary
- Airport type: Public
- Serves: Heze, Shandong, China
- Location: Menghai Town, Dingtao District
- Elevation AMSL: 46 m (151 ft)
- Coordinates: 35°12′48″N 115°44′12″E

Map
- Location of airport in Shandong

Runways
| Direction | Length | | Surface |
| Direction | m | ft | Surface |
|---|---|---|---|
| 18/36 | 2,600 | 8,530 |

Statistics (2025)
- Passengers: 837,835
- Aircraft movements: 11,183
- Cargo (metric tons): 1,514.0

Heze Mudan Airport
- Simplified Chinese: 菏泽牡丹机场
- Traditional Chinese: 菏澤牡丹機場
Transcriptions
Standard Mandarin
- Hanyu Pinyin: Hézé Mǔdān Jīchǎng

Heze Mudan Airport (IATA: HZA, ICAO: ZSHZ) is an airport serving the city of Heze in Shandong Province, China. It is located near Huangzhuang Village in Menghai Town (孟海镇), Dingtao District of Heze. The airport project received approval from the national government and the Central Military Commission in February 2017.

The construction budget for the airport is CN¥1.8 billion, which is funded by the National Development and Reform Commission, the Civil Aviation Administration of China, and the Shandong Provincial Government.

The airport opened on April 2, 2021.. This airport will be temporarily closed from 12:00 am on 25 April 2026 to 12:00 am on 10 June 2026 for upgrading facilities.

== History ==
In August 2012, Shandong Province proposed the construction of Heze Civil Airport and started the airport site selection work. In 2014, the primary selected site for Heze Airport was Menghai Town, Dingtao County.

On February 16, 2017, the construction of the Heze Civil Airport was approved by the central government; on December 12, the Heze Civil Airport project passed the feasibility study evaluation; on December 26, the Heze Civil Airport project started construction. Heze Airport is positioned as a domestic regional airport and is located near Huangzhuang Village, Menghai Town, Dingtao District, Heze City. The flight area is 4C and the runway is 2,600 meters long. The total project investment was approximately 1.8 billion yuan. The airport was planned to be completed and put into use in 2019.

On January 24, 2018, the Aviation Administration of China responded to the Civil Aviation Comprehensive Aircraft Letter (2018) No. 5, agreeing that Heze Airport should be renamed "Heze Mudan Airport".

The actual construction cost of Heze Mudan Airport is 1.979 billion yuan, and the airport was completed at the end of 2020. On January 18, 2021, Heze Mudan Airport successfully launched on-site verification test flights of flight procedures. Shandong Airlines B737-800 undertook the test flight mission. The test flight SC9006 completed various test subjects.

On April 2, 2021, a Shandong Airlines charter flight with flight number SC2319 arrived at Heze Mudan Airport from Jinan. After the first flight, starting from April 3, 2021, Shandong Airlines has operated the Qingdao-Heze-Xi'an route, flight number SC2287/2288, once a day; starting from April 4, it has operated the Xiamen-Heze-Shenyang route, flight number SC2275/2276.

In 2023, Heze Airport officially opened air mail transportation business.

This airport will be temporarily closed from 12:00 am on 25 April 2026 to 12:00 am on 10 June 2026 for upgrading facilities.

== Facilities ==
The airport has a 2,600-metre (8,500 ft) runway (class 4C), a 10,000-square-metre (110,000 sq ft) terminal building, and seven aircraft parking aprons. It is designed to serve 900,000 passengers and 6,500 tons of cargo annually by 2030.

== Airlines and destinations ==
| Airlines | Destinations |
|---|---|
| Beijing Capital Airlines | Haikou |
| China Southern Airlines | Changsha, Guangzhou, Guiyang, Shenzhen |
| Loong Air | Changchun, Chengdu–Tianfu, Chongqing, Dalian, Hangzhou, Harbin, Shenzhen |
| Spring Airlines | Shanghai–Pudong |
| XiamenAir | Quanzhou, Wuhan |

== See also ==
- List of airports in China
- List of the busiest airports in China
