= Haikou Meilan International Airport (company) =

Chinese airport company

- Type: joint venture
- Industry: holding company
- Headquarters: Meilan Airport, Haikou, China
- Revenue: ▼CN¥3.378 billion (2015)
- Operating income: ▲CN¥ 661 million (2015)
- Net income: ▲CN¥ 292 million (2015)
- Total assets: ▲CN¥23.673 billion (2015)
- Total equity: ▲CN¥6.880 billion (2015)
- Subsidiaries: HNA Infrastructure
- Rating: AA+ (Orient, September 2017)

Haikou Meilan International Airport Company Limited
- Simplified Chinese: 海口美兰国际机场有限责任公司
Transcriptions
Standard Mandarin
- Hanyu Pinyin: Hǎi kǒu měi lán guó jì jī chǎng yǒu xiàn zé rèn gōng sī

Haikou Meilan International Airport Co., Ltd. is a Chinese company. The company was the developer, owner and operator of the airport of the same name. However, the airport is now operated by the company's subsidiary HNA Infrastructure Co., Ltd. (formerly known as Hainan Meilan Airport).

== History ==
Haikou Meilan International Airport Co., Ltd. (Chinese: 海口美兰国际机场有限责任公司) was incorporated on 25 August 1998 by a consortium of Civil Aviation Administration of China (50%), Hainan Airlines (33.4%) China National Aviation Fuel Group (8.3%) and Hainan International Trust Investment Corporation (8.3%). Initially the company had a share capital of CN¥600 million. The company takeover the development of the airport from Haikou Meilan International Airport Corporation (Chinese: 海口美兰国际机场总公司), a subsidiary of Hainan Airport in the same year.

In 2000, HNA Group, an associate company of Hainan Airlines, became the controlling shareholder of the airport developer.

The company listed some of the assets to the Stock Exchange of Hong Kong as Hainan Meilan Airport (now known as HNA Infrastructure) in 2002. However, the runway was retained, despite the listed company had 20-year concession and obligation to maintain the runway.

Haikou Meilan International Airport was also in the consortium to acquire Bohai Trust. The stake were sold in 2012 to HNA Group.

In October 2016, the share capital had increased to CN¥3.106 billion.

In December 2016, the holding company decided to inject the runway of phase 1 to its listed subsidiary HNA Infrastructure in an all-share deal.

In August 2017, the company received a warning from China Securities Regulatory Commission regarding the incorrect information that was published.

== Shareholders ==
As of 13 October 2016

Name / transliteration	Chinese name	Percentage	Footnotes
HNA Airport Group		19.58%	an indirect subsidiary of listed company HNA Infrastructure Investment Group
China Development Bank		18.88%	owned by the central government
Hainan Development Holdings	海南省发展控股	16.65%	owned by Hainan Provincial People's Government
Hǎinán hánghuī nóngyè kāifā	海南航辉农业开发	14.99%	privately owned
Hǎinán hánglǚ jiāotōng fúwù	海南航旅交通服务	11.9%	subsidiary of HNA Group
Hainan Airlines		7.88%	listed company
Yángpǔ liánhǎi gōngmào	洋浦联海工贸	4.78%	privately owned based in Yangpu
China Southern Airlines		3.21%	listed company
China National Aviation Fuel Supply	中国航空油料	2.08%	a joint venture of state-owned China National Aviation Fuel Group, Sinopec Marketing and PetroChina Marketing

== Equity investments ==
- Grand China Air (8.30%)
- Hainan Airlines (7.08%; cross ownership)
