= Weifang Airport =

Weifang Airport 潍坊机场
- IATA: WEF; ICAO: ZSWF

Summary
- Airport type: Public
- Operator: HNA Infrastructure Investment Group
- Serves: Weifang
- Location: Weifang, Shandong, China
- Opened: April 4, 1996
- Elevation AMSL: 47.4 m (156 ft)
- Coordinates: 36°38′49″N 119°07′07″E

Map
- Location of airport in Shandong

Runways
| Direction | Length | | Surface |
| Direction | m | ft | Surface |
|---|---|---|---|
| 17/35 | 2,600 | 8,530 | Concrete |

Statistics (2025)
- Passengers: 469,259
- Cargo (metric tons): 17,350.1
- Aircraft movements: 5,676

Weifang Airport
- Simplified Chinese: 潍坊机场
- Traditional Chinese: 濰坊機場
Transcriptions
Standard Mandarin
- Hanyu Pinyin: Wéifāng Jīchǎng

Weifang Airport (IATA: WEF, ICAO: ZSWF) is an airport in Weifang, Shandong, People's Republic of China. The airport operator called "Weifang Nanyuan Airport Ltd." but official name called "Weifang Airport".

== History ==
Construction of Weifang Airport began in 1951 as an air force military airport. The civil aviation section of Weifang Airport is a 4D-level dual-use military and civilian airport, which was expanded from a military IIB-level airport and completed in June 1995. It officially opened to traffic in April 1996 and can accommodate B767 and A300 aircraft.

In October 1999, Weifang Airport was forced to suspend operations due to financial difficulties. In April 2000, after a six-month suspension of operations, Weifang Airport began exploring cooperation with strong airlines, initially entering into a three-year airport management agreement with Shandong Airlines.

In May 2003, affected by the SARS epidemic and insufficient passenger demand in Shandong Airlines, Shandong Airlines requested the Weifang Municipal People's Government to terminate the trusteeship of Weifang Airport; in July, the agreement was officially terminated, and subsequently Weifang Airport Management Co., Ltd. was established to take over the operation of the airport.

On February 1, 2004, HNA Group Co., Ltd. officially took over Weifang Airport and assumed responsibility for its operation and management.

In 2009, the proposal of relocation and reconstruction of Weifang Airport was initiated. In September 2013, the relocation project of Weifang Airport entered the site selection stage for the new airport.

The relocation of Weifang Airport was listed as a key project of Weifang City in 2013. The new airport is planned to be built in northern Weifang, covering an area of 6,000-8,000 mu, with a planned total investment of 6 billion yuan.

On September 22, 2015, Weifang Airport held its first international flight opening ceremony. An Airbus A320 aircraft flew directly from Incheon Airport in South Korea, parked on the tarmac, and connected with the newly built jet bridge, marking the official opening of Weifang Airport as a port of entry for foreign countries.

On May 1, 2022, Weifang Airport was temporarily closed for runway maintenance. After about six months of repairing works, Weifang Airport officially resumed cargo flights on October 24, 2022; passenger flights resumed on October 30, 2022.

== Airlines and destinations ==
| Airlines | Destinations |
|---|---|
| 9 Air | Dalian, Guangzhou |
| China Express Airlines | Chongqing, Shenyang |
| Loong Air | Hangzhou, Harbin |
| Qingdao Airlines | Changchun, Haikou |

== See also ==
- List of airports in the People's Republic of China
