= Shaoguan Danxia Airport =

Shaoguan Danxia Airport 韶关丹霞机场
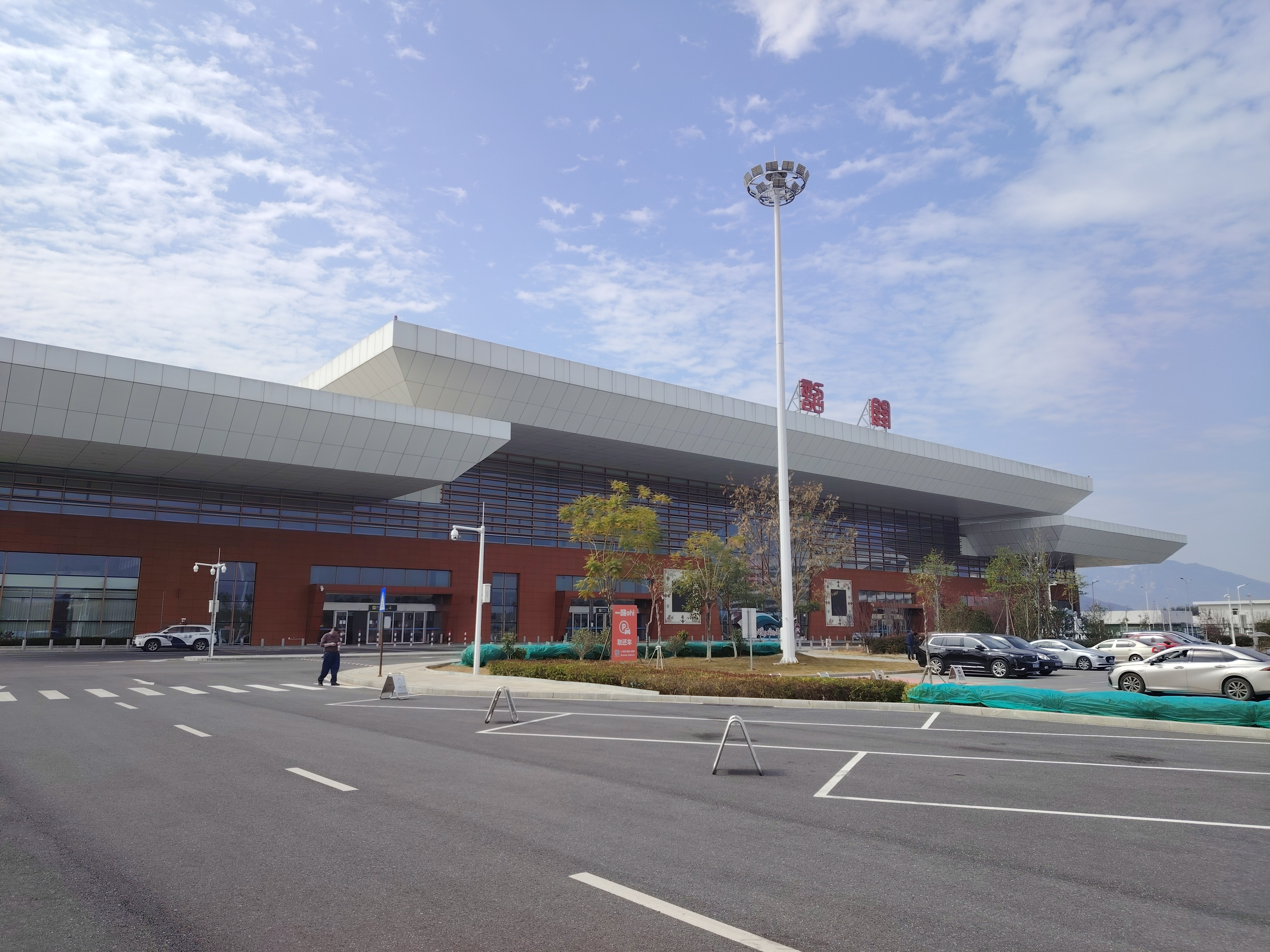
- IATA: HSC; ICAO: ZGSG

Summary
- Airport type: Military/Public
- Serves: Shaoguan, Guangdong, China
- Location: Guitou Town, Ruyuan County
- Opened: 27 November 2021
- Coordinates: 24°58′43″N 113°25′16″E

Map
- Location of airport in Guangdong

Runways
Direction	Length		Surface
Direction	m	ft	Surface
15/33	2,800	9,186

Statistics (2021)
- Passengers: 9,423
- Aircraft movements: 148

Shaoguan Danxia Airport
- Simplified Chinese: 韶关丹霞机场
- Traditional Chinese: 韶關丹霞機場
Transcriptions
Standard Mandarin
- Hanyu Pinyin: Shāoguān Dānxiá Jīchǎng

Shaoguan Danxia Airport (IATA: HSC, ICAO: ZGSG) is a dual-use military and civil airport in Shaoguan, Guangdong Province, China. It is located in the town of Guitou in Ruyuan Yao Autonomous County, 18 km southeast of Lechang Township, 25 km northwest of the city center. The air base was built in 1970 and briefly served commercial flights from 1986 to 1989.

Shaoguan was planning to expand the airport in early 2008. However, due to the Wuhan–Guangzhou high-speed railway put into service since late 2009, Shaoguan Railway Station has become a major and the most convenient transportation hub connecting Pearl River Delta cities. Also, Lechang Township has promised a 100 million CNY investment for Lechang East Railway Station. The airport expansion project was on hold until October 2017, and it opened on November 27, 2021.

== Airlines and destinations ==
Airlines	Destinations
Beijing Capital Airlines	Haikou, Hangzhou, Kunming, Xi'an
Chengdu Airlines	Chengdu–Tianfu, Jieyang
China Southern Airlines	Beijing–Daxing
Juneyao Air	Shanghai–Pudong

== See also ==
- List of airports in China
- List of the busiest airports in China
- List of People's Liberation Army Air Force airbases
- List of airports in Guangdong province, from 1911-current (Zh-Wiki)
