= Hangzhou Xiaoshan International Airport =

Airport serving Hangzhou, Zhejiang, China

Hangzhou Xiaoshan International Airport 杭州萧山国际机场

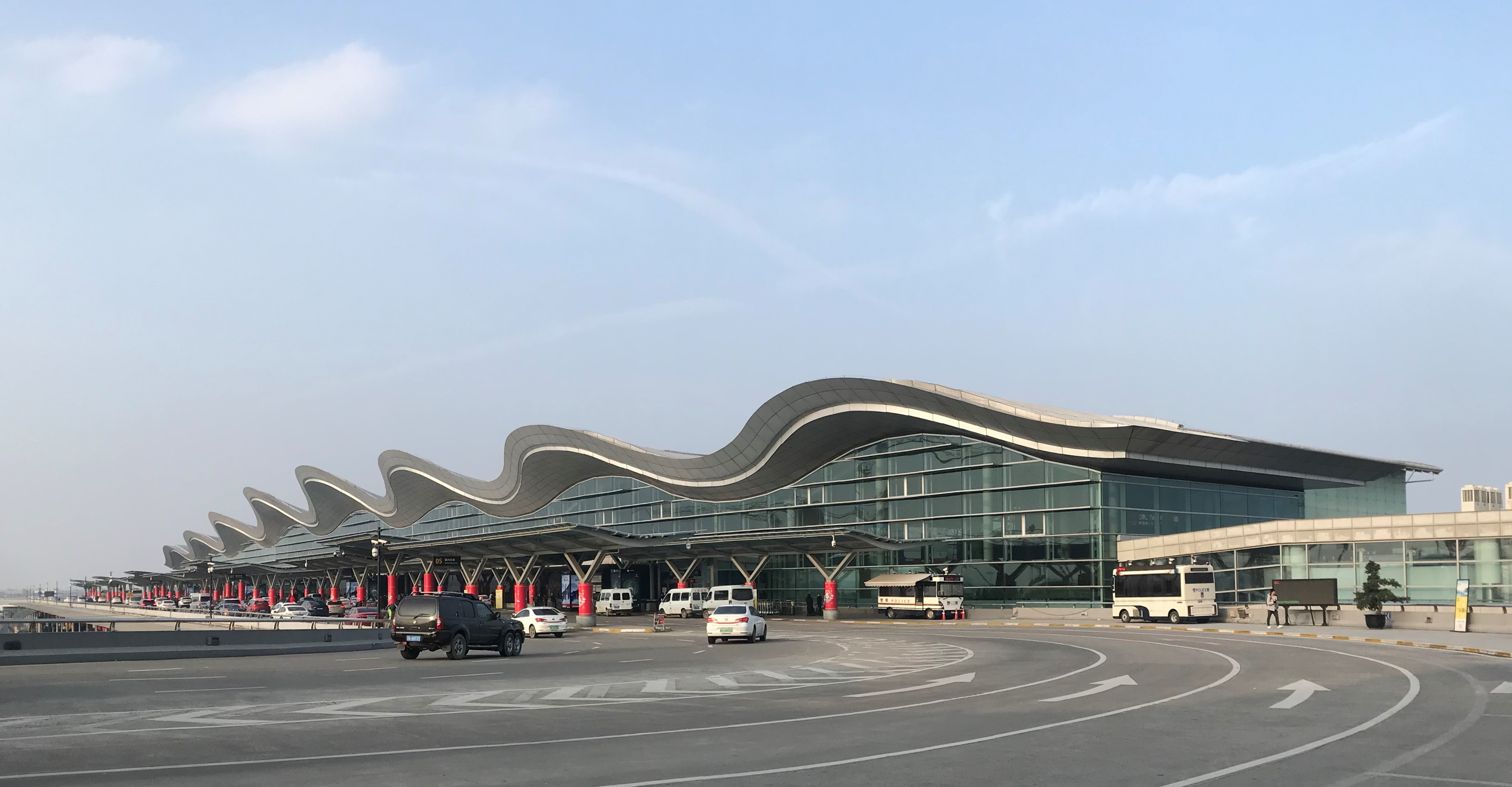
- IATA: HGH; ICAO: ZSHC

Summary
- Airport type: Public
- Operator: Hangzhou Xiaoshan International Airport Co. Ltd.
- Serves: Hangzhou
- Location: Yingbin Avenue, Xiaoshan, Hangzhou, Zhejiang, China
- Opened: 30 December 2000; 25 years ago
- Hub for: Loong Air; SF Airlines; XiamenAir
- Focus city for: Air China; China Eastern Airlines; China Southern Airlines; Hainan Airlines; Sichuan Airlines
- Elevation AMSL: 7 m (23 ft)
- Coordinates: 30°14′13.6″N 120°25′55.0″E
- Website: www.hzairport.com

Maps
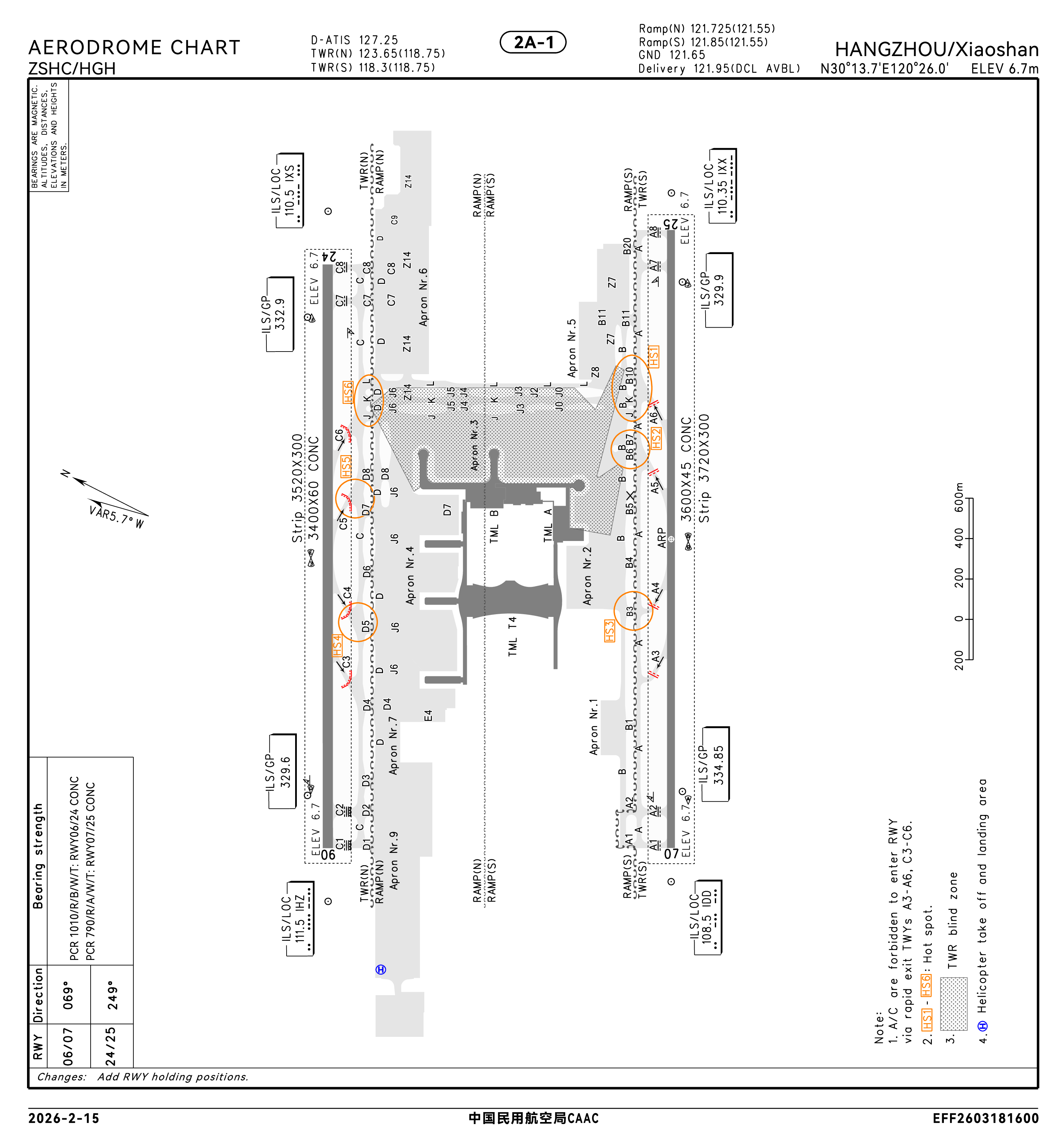
- CAAC airport chart

- Location in Zhejiang Location in China

Runways
Direction	Length		Surface
Direction	m	ft	Surface
07/25	3,600	11,811	Concrete
06/24	3,400	11,155	Concrete

Statistics (2025)
- Passengers: 50,459,018 ▲5.0%
- Cargo (tonnes): 792,710.1 ▼7.9%
- Aircraft movements: 329,355 ▲2.8%
- Source:China's busiest airports by passenger traffic

Hangzhou Xiaoshan International Airport
- Simplified Chinese: 杭州萧山国际机场
- Traditional Chinese: 杭州蕭山國際機場
Transcriptions
Standard Mandarin
- Hanyu Pinyin: Hángzhōu Xiāoshān Guójì Jīchǎng

Hangzhou Xiaoshan International Airport (IATA: HGH, ICAO: ZSHC) is an international airport serving Hangzhou, a major city in the Yangtze River Delta region and the capital of East China's Zhejiang province. The airport is located on the southern shore of Qiantang River in Xiaoshan District and is 27 km (17 mi) east of downtown Hangzhou. Architecture firm Aedas designed Hangzhou Xiaoshan International Airport.

The airport has service to destinations throughout China. International destinations are mainly in the east and southeast Asia, and points in Africa, Europe, Oceania, and South Asia. The airport also serves as a focus city for Air China, China Eastern Airlines, China Southern Airlines, Hainan Airlines and Xiamen Airlines.

In 2025, Hangzhou airport handled 50,459,018 passengers, ranking as the 7th busiest airport in China. Additionally, the airport ranked seventh busiest in terms of cargo with 792,710.1 tonnes and was the country's tenth busiest airport by traffic movements at 329,355.

On 8 September 2022, Terminal 4 of Hangzhou Airport opened.

Hangzhou Xiaoshan International Airport has four terminals. The smaller Terminal 2 serves all international/regional flights while the larger Terminal 1 and 3 solely handles domestic traffic. A newly built Terminal 4 handles both international/regional flights and selected domestic flights. The airport is located just outside the city in the Xiaoshan District with direct bus service and metro linking the airport with Downtown Hangzhou. A new elevated airport expressway is built on top of the existing highway between the airport and downtown Hangzhou.

== History ==
The airport was planned to be constructed in three phases. The first phase of construction started in July 1997, and was completed and opened for traffic on 30 December 2000. It replaced the old Hangzhou Jianqiao Airport, which was a dual-use civil and military airfield. In March 2004, the airport officially became an international airport after immigration and customs facilities were built and put into service.

The second runway of the airport began construction on 8 November 2007, as part of the airport's Phase II expansion project. A second runway has since been completed and it was officially put into operation on 30 December 2012. It is listed as Runway 07/25, 3,600 m long.

The airport was a hub of CNAC Zhejiang. After the airlines' merger with Air China, the latter inherited the Hangzhou hub.

KLM launched the first intercontinental air route out of Hangzhou, to Amsterdam, on 8 May 2010.

== Facilities ==
Phase One of the airport occupies 7,260 acres (29.4 km^{2}) of land. It has a capacity of eight million passengers and 110,000 tons of cargo a year, and can handle aircraft as large as the Boeing 747-400. It has one runway which is 3,600 meters (11,811 ft 0 in) long and 45 meters (147 ft 8 in) wide. The passenger terminal can handle 3,600 passengers an hour and is 100,000 square meters (1,100,000 sq ft) in size (including an underground parking of 22,000 square meters (240,000 sq ft)). The departure level has 36 ticket counters, including 12 in the international side of the terminal. There are 2,900 seats in the departure lounge. The immigration and customs area occupies 9,500 square meters (102,000 sq ft) of terminal space.

The apron occupies 340,000 square metres (3,700,000 sq ft) of land, and there are 12 jetways and 18 departure gates.

Maintenance facilities are certified to perform B-Check on all types of aircraft and C-Check on Boeing 737 and Boeing 757 aircraft.

Phase Two of the airport expansion project began construction on 8 November 2007. It included an International Terminal, a second Domestic Terminal, and a new runway. The International Terminal was completed on 3 June 2010. The terminal has 8 air bridgegates, with one gate capable of handling the Airbus A380. All international flights, including flights to Hong Kong, Macau, and Taiwan depart from this terminal. The original terminal handles exclusively domestic flights. All other constructions were completed and operations began on 30 December 2012.

Phase III of Hangzhou Xiaoshan International Airport passed the acceptance inspection in March 2022, marking an important supporting project for the 19th Asian Games in Hangzhou. Upon the completion of Phase III, Hangzhou Airport will become the second-largest aviation hub in East China. On 8 September, Hangzhou Xiaoshan International Airport's T4 terminal conducted trial operations; on 10 September, international flights commenced trial operations; in mid-September, the T4 terminal and transportation center were officially put into operation, with a designed annual passenger throughput of 50 million. Starting from 16 September, the parking lot, online car pickup area, T4 taxi pickup area, and B2 level subway entrance of Hangzhou Xiaoshan International Airport's transportation center conducted synchronized trial operations. On 22 September, the Phase III project of Hangzhou Xiaoshan International Airport, an important supporting project for the 19th Asian Games in Hangzhou, was officially put into operation.

The newly built T4 terminal has a total floor area of 720,000 square metres (7,800,000 sq ft) and is designed to handle 50 million passengers annually. It includes two underground levels and five above-ground levels. It is a green building with a layout different from other terminals at Hangzhou Airport, featuring a centralized configuration in its plan layout. The interior design draws inspiration from the typical imagery of lotus leaves reaching to the sky and lotus flowers emerging from water in West Lake. This imagery is integrated with architectural structural design, optimization of space lighting, ventilation, and other performance aspects, creating lotus-shaped skylights and a central lotus valley in the main building of the terminal.

The new runway is 3,400 meters (11,154 ft 10 in) long and 60 meters (196 ft 10 in) wide, which is capable of handling the Airbus A380. The new domestic terminal (T3) has 90 Check-in desks and 21 Self Check-in counters. It also adds 26 security lanes and 31 aerobridge gates. All public spaces of the terminal have free WIFI services. With the addition of the new passenger terminal, the airport now has a total terminal floor area of 370,000 square meters (4,000,000 sq ft) and will enable the airport to handle 8,520 passengers at peak hour and 32.5 million passengers annually.

Loong Airlines has its headquarters in the Loong Air Office Building (长龙航空办公大楼; Chánglóng Hángkōng Bàngōngdàlóu) on the airport property.

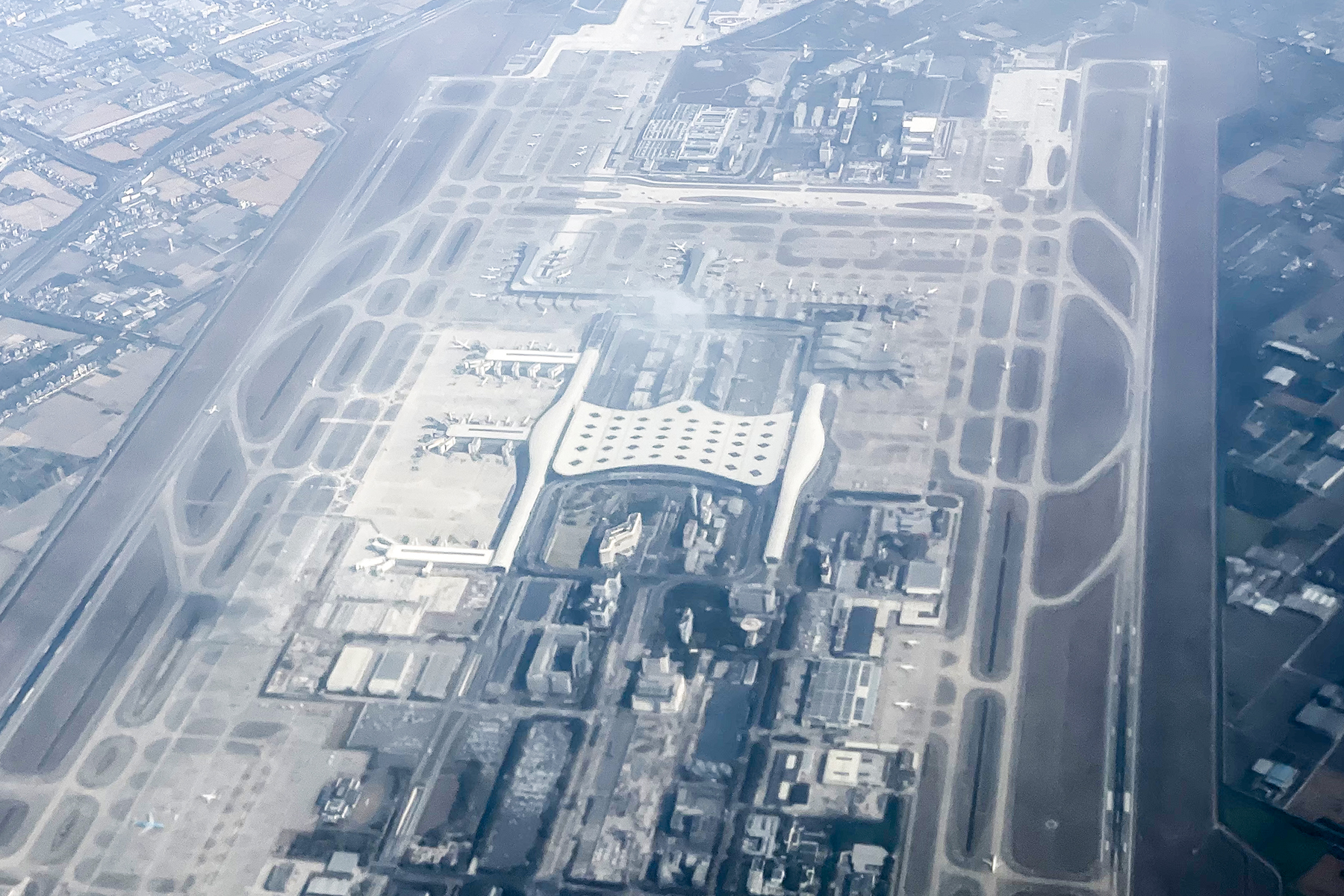
Aerial view of Hangzhou Xiaoshan International Airport

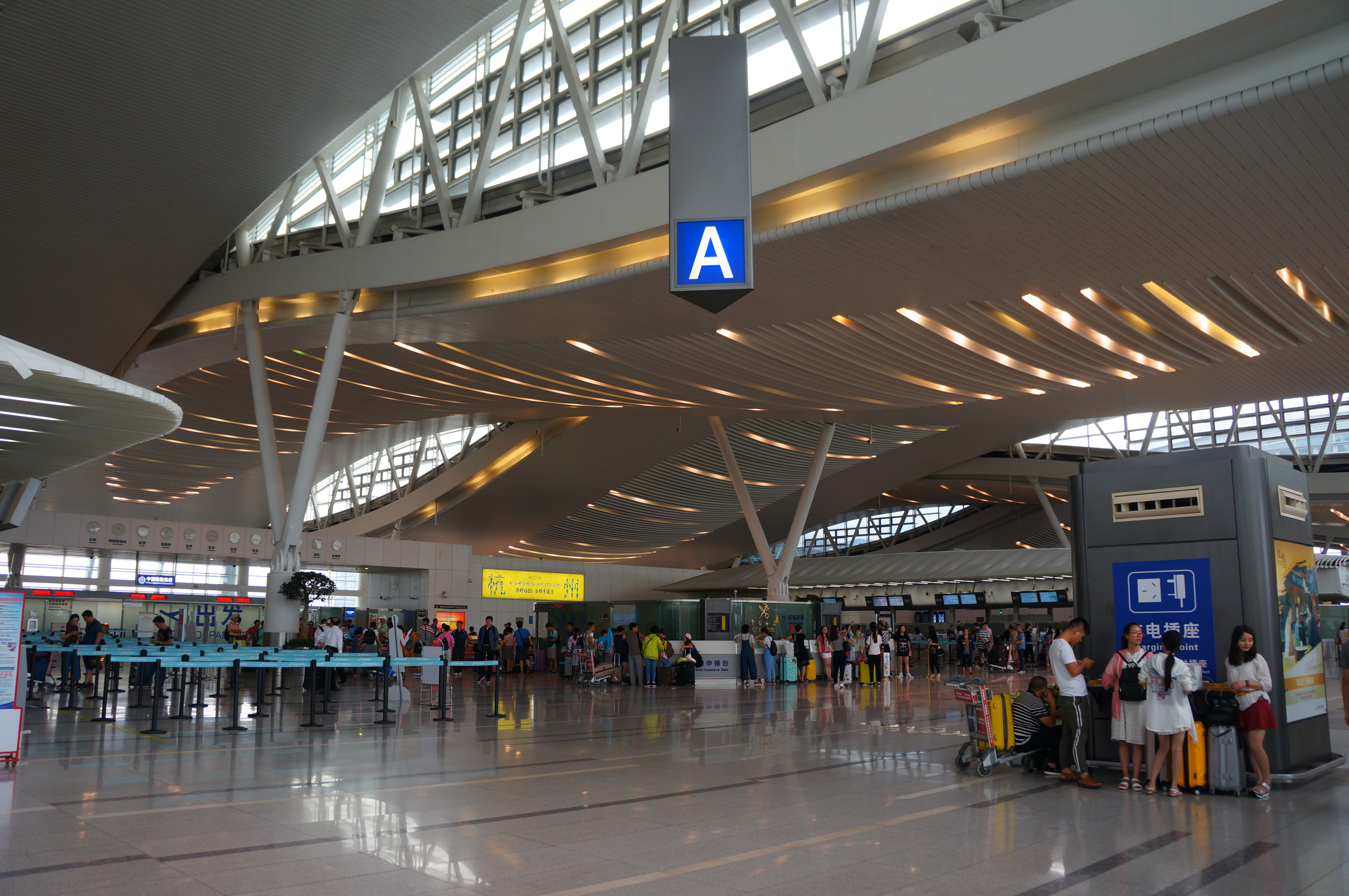
Terminal 2

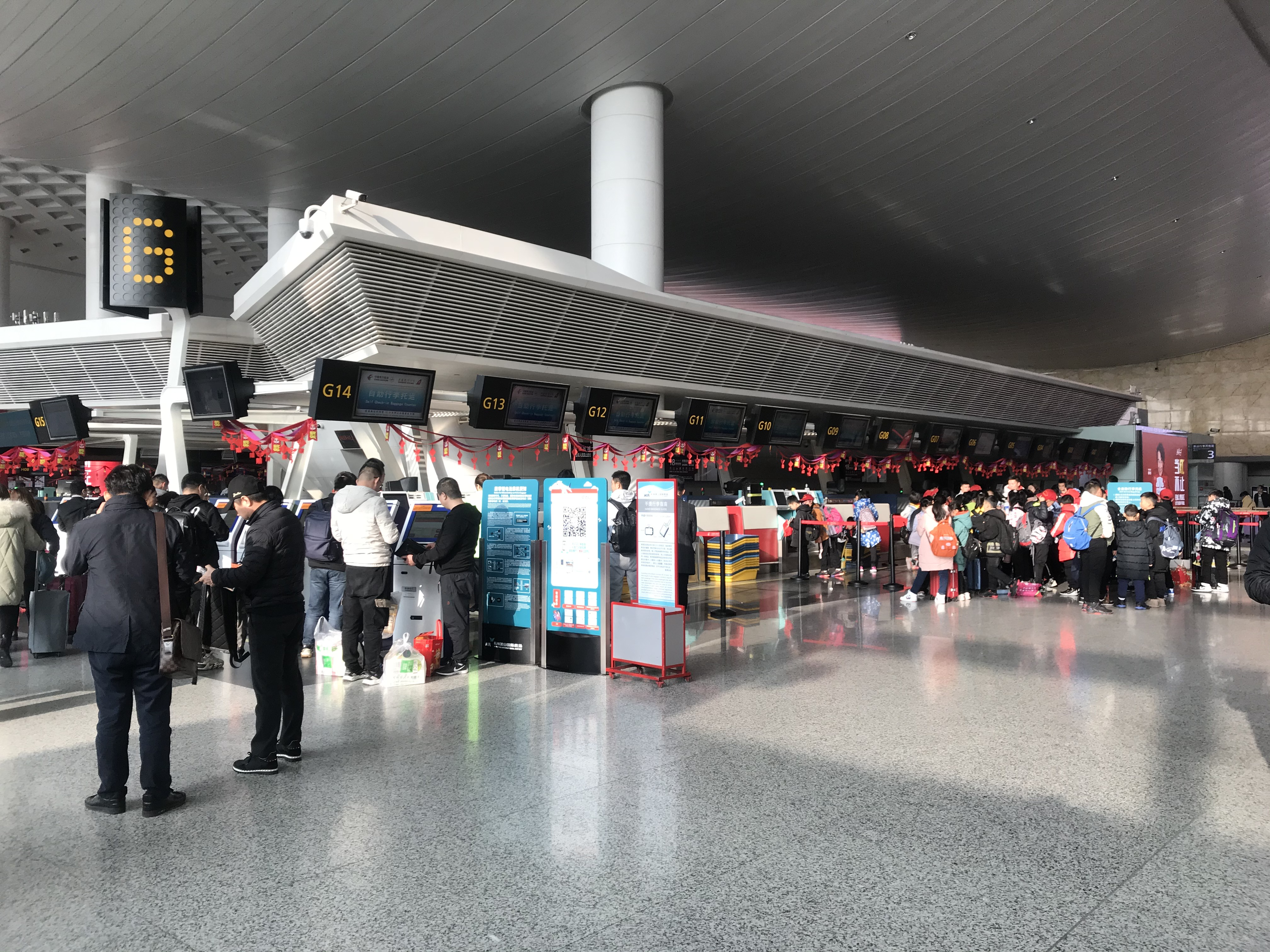
Terminal 3

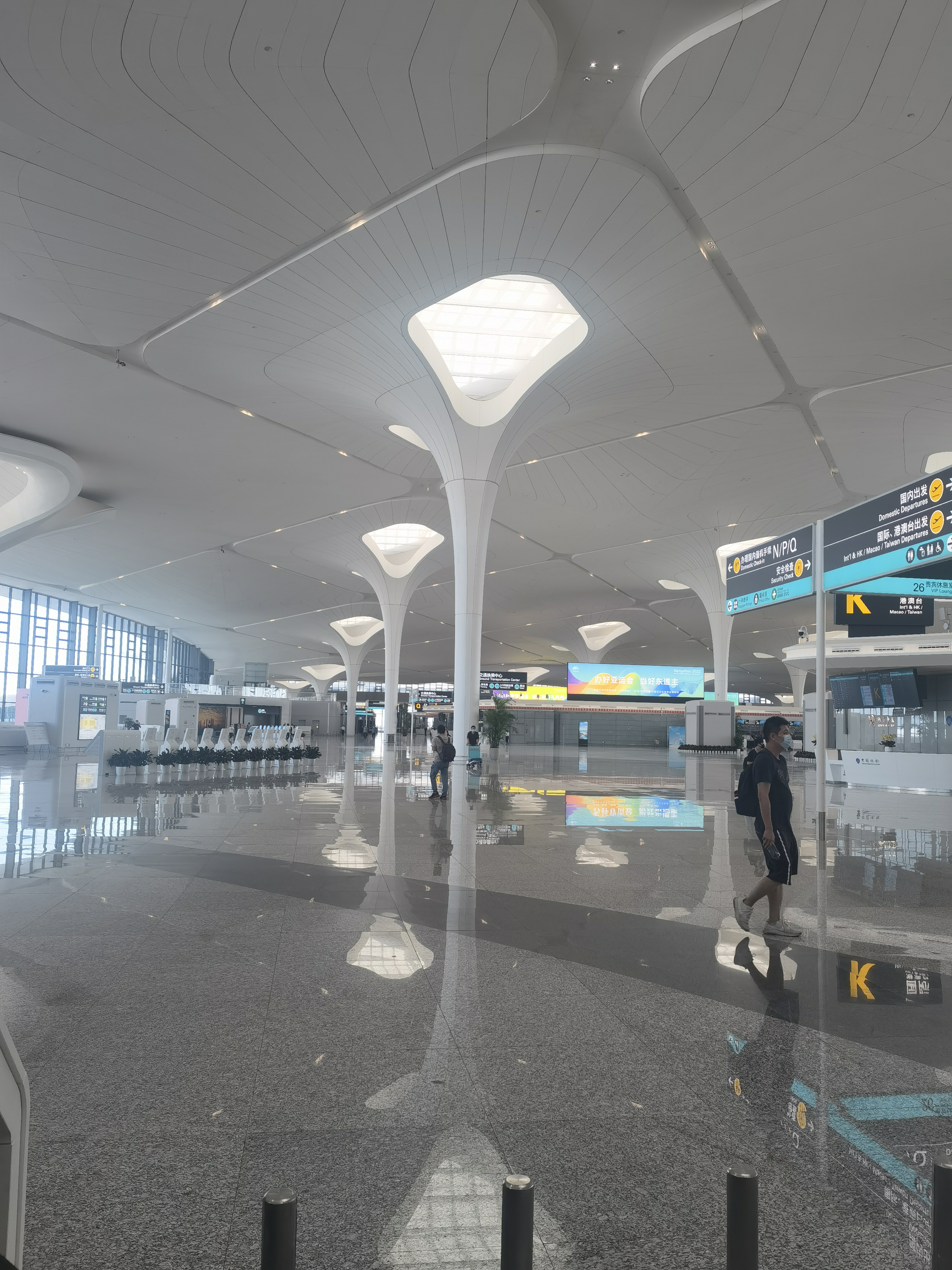
Terminal 4

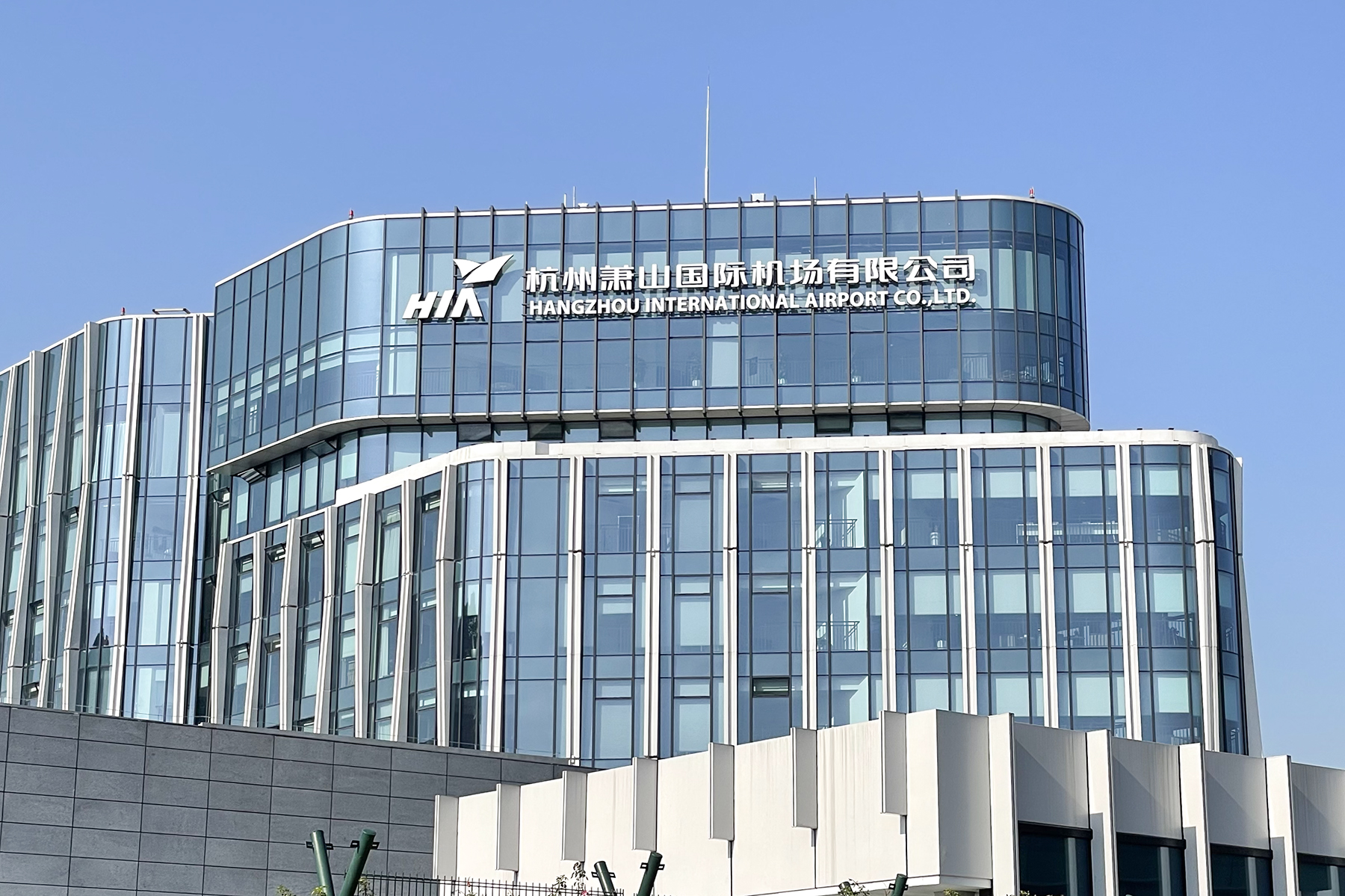
Hangzhou Airport office building

== Ground transportation ==
=== Airport bus ===
There are airport bus services linking the airport to points throughout Zhejiang and cities in Jiangsu.

Bus services to/from downtown Hangzhou originate/terminate at the Ticketing Office on Tiyuchang Road with intermediate stops in between.

=== Rail ===
Xiaoshan International Airport station of the Hangzhou Metro allows passengers to transfer to Line 1, Line 7 and Line 19 which connect the airport with the city downtown.

=== Highway ===
The Airport is accessed by Airport Road, which connects to the Airport Expressway and is linked to downtown Hangzhou by the Xixing Bridge. The Airport Expressway also has an exit at North Shixin Road, which is linked to downtown Xiaoshan. The G92 Hangzhou Bay Ring Expressway has an exit at the airport.

== Airlines and destinations ==
=== Passenger ===
Airlines	Destinations
9 Air	Guangzhou
Air China	Bangkok–Suvarnabhumi, Beijing–Capital, Beijing–Daxing, Changchun, Chengdu–Shuangliu, Chengdu–Tianfu, Chongqing, Dalian, Daqing, Dubai–International, Dunhuang, Guangyuan, Guangzhou, Guiyang, Haikou, Hanoi, Harbin, Hohhot, Hong Kong, Jieyang, Korla, Kunming, Lanzhou, Lijiang, Nanning, Ordos, Osaka–Kansai, Phuket, Seoul–Incheon, Shenzhen, Taipei–Taoyuan, Tianjin, Tokyo–Narita, Ürümqi, Weihai, Xi'an, Xining, Yantai, Yinchuan, Yuncheng, Zhanjiang, Zhengzhou, Zhuhai
Air Guilin	Guilin
Air Macau	Macau
AirAsia	Kota Kinabalu
AirAsia X	Kuala Lumpur–International
All Nippon Airways	Tokyo–Narita
Asiana Airlines	Seoul–Incheon
Beijing Capital Airlines	Ankang, Bangkok–Suvarnabhumi, Beijing–Daxing, Chengdu–Shuangliu, Chongqing, Enshi, Guangzhou, Guilin, Guiyang, Haikou, Harbin, Jeju, Korla, Kunming, Lanzhou, Lijiang, Lisbon, Madrid, Melbourne, Moscow–Sheremetyevo, Nanning, Nanyang, Osaka–Kansai, Qingdao, Sanya, Shaoguan, Shijiazhuang, Tangshan, Ürümqi, Vancouver,Xi'an, Xining, Yichang, Yinchuan, Zhengzhou, Zhongwei; Seasonal: Naha
Cathay Pacific	Hong Kong
Chengdu Airlines	Chengdu–Shuangliu, Dalian, Haikou, Sanya
China Eastern Airlines	Auckland, Beijing–Daxing, Changchun, Chengdu–Shuangliu, Chengdu–Tianfu, Dali, Guangzhou, Guiyang, Ho Chi Minh City, Hong Kong, Jiamusi, Jieyang, Kashgar, Kuala Lumpur–International, Kunming, Lanzhou, Linyi, Mudanjiang, Qingdao, Seoul–Incheon, Shanghai–Pudong, Shenzhen, Singapore, Sydney, Taiyuan, Tangshan, Tashkent, Wuhan, Xi'an, Xinyang, Xishuangbanna, Yanji, Yantai, Yinchuan
China Express Airlines	Baotou, Changzhi, Chifeng, Hohhot
China Southern Airlines	Aksu, Beijing–Daxing, Changchun, Dalian, Guangzhou, Guiyang, Haikou, Harbin, Jieyang, Lanzhou, Meizhou, Nanning, Sanya, Shenyang, Shenzhen, Ürümqi, Wuhan, Zhengzhou, Zhuhai
China United Airlines	Beijing–Daxing, Foshan
Chongqing Airlines	Chongqing, Guiyang
Colorful Guizhou Airlines	Guiyang
Donghai Airlines	Shenzhen, Shiyan
Eastar Jet	Busan (begins 3 December 2026)
Egyptair	Cairo
Emirates	Dubai–International
Etihad Airways	Abu Dhabi (begins 4 March 2027)
EVA Air	Taipei–Taoyuan
Hainan Airlines	Beijing–Capital, Changsha, Chongqing, Dalian, Guangzhou, Haikou, Hanzhong, Harbin, Jieyang, Sanya, Shenzhen, Taiyuan, Ürümqi, Xi'an, Zhengzhou, Zhuhai
Hebei Airlines	Chengde, Hohhot, Mianyang, Shijiazhuang, Ulanqab, Yinchuan, Zhangjiakou
Hong Kong Airlines	Hong Kong
Jiangxi Air	Zhengzhou
Juneyao Air	Chifeng, Dalian, Guiyang, Haikou, Harbin, Huai'an, Huizhou, Kunming, Linfen, Qingdao, Wuhai, Yulin (Shaanxi), Zhengzhou
Korean Air	Seoul–Incheon
Kunming Airlines	Kunming, Mangshi
Lao Airlines	Vientiane
Loong Air	Aksu, Almaty, Aral, Bangkok–Suvarnabhumi, Beijing–Capital, Bijie, Busan, Changbaishan,, Changchun, Changsha, Chengdu–Shuangliu, Chengdu–Tianfu, Chongqing, Dalian, Dazhou, Delingha, Dongying, Enshi, Guangzhou, Guiyang, Handan, Harbin, Heze, Hong Kong, Huaihua, Jeju, Jingzhou, Jixi, Karamay, Kashgar, Korla, Kuala Lumpur-International, Lanzhou, Lijiang, Linyi, Osaka–Kansai, Quanzhou, Sanya, Shenyang, Shenzhen, Singapore, Tonghua, Tumxuk, Ürümqi, Weifang, Weihai, Wuhan, Xi'an, Xiangyang, Xining, Xishuangbanna, Yantai, Yinchuan, Zhangjiajie, Zhengzhou, Zunyi–Xinzhou
Lucky Air	Ganzhou, Haikou, Kunming
Okay Airways	Jieyang, Tianjin, Xingyi, Xishuangbanna, Yulin (Guangxi)
Qanot Sharq	Tashkent
Qatar Airways	Doha
Royal Brunei Airlines	Bandar Seri Begawan
Ruili Airlines	Kunming
Scoot	Singapore
Shandong Airlines	Beijing–Capital, Dalian, Guilin, Qingdao, Ürümqi, Xiamen, Yantai, Zhuhai
Shanghai Airlines	Guangzhou, Zhengzhou
Shenzhen Airlines	Guangzhou, Shenzhen, Yuncheng
Sichuan Airlines	Changde, Chengdu–Shuangliu, Chengdu–Tianfu, Chongqing, Dunhuang, Guangzhou, Guiyang, Harbin, Kunming, Lanzhou, Lhasa, Luzhou, Mianyang, Nanning, Ürümqi, Xishuangbanna, Yibin, Zhaotong
Singapore Airlines	Singapore
Spring Airlines	Jeju, Jieyang, Lanzhou, Shenyang, Shijiazhuang
Suparna Airlines	Sanya, Shenzhen
Thai AirAsia	Bangkok–Don Mueang
Thai Lion Air	Bangkok–Don Mueang
Thai VietJet Air	Bangkok–Suvarnabhumi
Tianjin Airlines	Chongqing, Haikou, Hengyang, Jinchang, Tianjin, Ürümqi, Wanzhou, Xi'an
Tibet Airlines	Dali, Lhasa, Luzhou, Xichang, Yibin
Urumqi Air	Longnan, Qingyang, Ürümqi
Uzbekistan Airways	Tashkent
Vietnam Airlines	Hanoi
West Air	Chongqing
XiamenAir	Beihai, Beijing–Daxing, Changchun, Changsha, Chengdu–Tianfu, Chongqing, Dalian, Guangzhou, Guilin, Guiyang, Haikou, Ho Chi Minh City, Harbin, Hohhot, Hong Kong, Kuala Lumpur–International, Kunming, Lanzhou, Liuzhou, Macau, Manila, Mudanjiang, Nanchong, Nanning, Osaka–Kansai, Qingdao, Quanzhou, Sanya, Shenyang, Shenzhen, Singapore, Taipei–Taoyuan, Taiyuan, Tianjin, Ürümqi, Wuhan, Xiamen, Xi'an, Xining, Yinchuan, Zhengzhou, Zhuhai, Zunyi–Maotai

=== Cargo ===
Airlines	Destinations
Air China Cargo	Liege, Madrid
Atlas Air	Anchorage, Chicago–O'Hare
Maersk Air Cargo	Billund
Mas Air	Mexico City
My Freighter	Tashkent
SF Airlines	Beijing–Capital, Beijing–Daxing, Chengdu–Shuangliu, Los Angeles, New York–JFK, Qingdao, Shenzhen, Singapore, Wuhan, Xi'an
Suparna Airlines Cargo	Guangzhou, Manila
YTO Cargo Airlines	Dhaka, Dubai–Al Maktoum, Kolkata, Kuala Lumpur–International, Manila, Moscow–Sheremetyevo, Seoul–Incheon, Singapore, Ürümqi, Tashkent

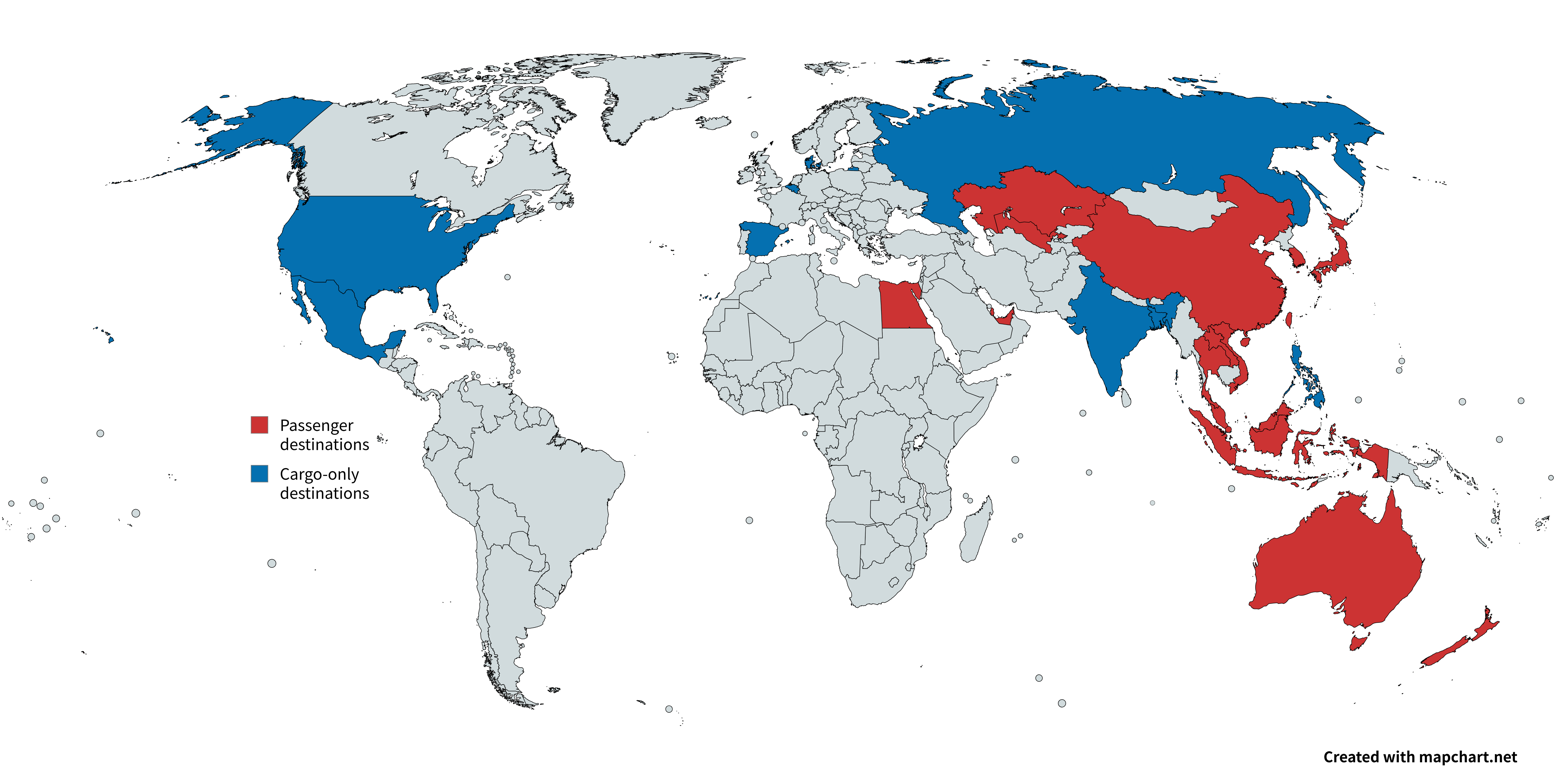
Red for passenger destinations, blue for cargo-only destinations. As of February 2026.

== Accidents and incidents ==
- On 24 November 1933, a Sikorsky S-38 departed from Shanghai, impacted a hill, and crashed during the approach to Hangzhou. All 11 occupants were injured, and the aircraft was destroyed. There were no fatalities.
- On 10 April 1934, a Sikorsky S-38 departed from Shanghai, crashed in the Bay of Hangzhou, killing all 4 people on board, including 3 crews and one passenger. The cause of the accident was not determined.
- On 7 March 1944, a Douglas C-47 Skytrain crashed shortly after takeoff from Hangzhou due to the failure to gain height caused by being overweight. The twin-engine aircraft hit trees, stalled, and crashed in a huge explosion. All 2 pilots on board were killed.
- On 28 January 1947, a Curtiss C-46 Commando departed from Hangzhou Airport and crashed about 30 minutes after its departure. 25 occupants were killed while a passenger was seriously injured but died a few hours later. Following this incident, the State Secretary of Transport in China decided to suspend the operations of all Chinese operators for few days.
- On the evening of 7 July 2010, the airport was shut down for an hour when an unidentified flying object was detected. Flights were diverted to the nearby airports in Ningbo, Zhejiang and Wuxi, Jiangsu. Eighteen flights were affected. Though normal operations resumed four hours later, the incident captured the attention of the Chinese media and sparked a firestorm of speculation on the UFO's identity.
- On 8 January 2022, an Aviastar-TU Tupolev Tu-204-100C, registration code RA-64032, was preparing for a cargo flight to Novosibirsk when it was destroyed by fire at the airport, likely caused by an oxygen system component malfunction. All eight crew members escaped uninjured.

== See also ==
- Hangzhou Jianqiao Airport
- List of airports in China
- List of the busiest airports in China
