= Changde Taohuayuan Airport =

Airport in Changde, Hunan, China

- IATA: CGD; ICAO: ZGCD

Summary
- Serves: Changde, Hunan
- Coordinates: 28°55′08″N 111°38′24″E

Map
- Location of airport in Hunan

Runways
Direction	Length		Surface
Direction	m	ft	Surface
02/20	2,550	8,366

Statistics (2025)
- Passengers: 782,822
- Aircraft movements: 32,862
- Cargo (metric tons): 0.0
- Source: List of the busiest airports in the People's Republic of China

Changde Taohuayuan Airport
- Simplified Chinese: 常德桃花源机场
- Traditional Chinese: 常德桃花源機場
Transcriptions
Standard Mandarin
- Hanyu Pinyin: Chángdé Táohuāyuán Jīchǎng

Changde Taohuayuan Airport (IATA: CGD, ICAO: ZGCD) is an airport in Changde, a city in the Hunan province of China.

== History ==
Changde Taohuayuan Airport is located in the southwest of Changde City (within Doumuhu Town), 12.2 kilometers from the city center. Construction of the airport began in 1958, and in 1964, passenger and cargo flights between Changde and Changsha were launched using Y-5 aircraft.

In 1986, Changde Taohuayuan Airport underwent its first expansion, becoming a 3C-level airport. In 1991, the expansion project was completed, and it became a 3C-level airport. Flights from Changde to Guangzhou and Shenzhen were opened, operated by Y-7 and An-24 aircraft.

In December 1993, Changde Airport underwent another expansion to meet the standards of a 4C-level airport. The expansion was completed in August 1996, and the airport officially resumed operations on 3 October of the same year, launching its first flight from Changde to Guangzhou using a B737 aircraft.

The expansion project of Taohuayuan Airport was launched in 2007. In January 2008, the expansion plan passed industry review. In January 2009, the Hunan Provincial Development and Reform Commission approved the expansion project. The airport expansion project set 2020 as the target year for construction, with a flight zone rating of 4D, a designed annual passenger throughput of 2.2 million, a cargo and mail throughput of 16,000 tons, and 21,000 aircraft takeoffs and landings. The total investment was 593 million yuan. In 2025, the airport's actual passenger throughput was 782,822, far below the annual passenger throughput of 2.2 million set for 2020 during the expansion.

On 26 February 2011, a new round of airport expansion was launched, specifying that the new terminal building would have a floor area of approximately 20,000 square meters, and the plaza in front of the terminal would have a floor area of approximately 18,000 square meters, with a construction period of two years. Upon completion, Taohuayuan Airport will be upgraded from its current 4C level to a 4D level airport, with 13 parking stands capable of accommodating large aircraft such as the Boeing 767.

On 16 December 2012, the expansion project officially started. After two and a half years of construction, the new terminal building of Changde Taohuayuan Airport passed the completion acceptance on 26 November 2015, with a total investment of nearly 650 million yuan. The new terminal building was officially put into use on 22 December 2015.

After three rounds of expansion, the airport now covers a total area of 2,300 mu (approximately 153 hectares) and has a runway length of 2,600 meters. It has four Class D aircraft parking positions and nine Class C aircraft parking positions, capable of accommodating fully loaded takeoffs and landings of medium-sized passenger aircraft such as the A321 and B737.

On 26 June 2019, the Hunan Provincial Development and Reform Commission approved the feasibility study report for the Changde Taohuayuan Airport temporary port opening project, with an estimated total investment of 87.24 million yuan. On 11 December 2019, Changde Taohuayuan Airport opened a route to Bangkok, Thailand, successfully achieving temporary opening to the outside world.

== Airlines and destinations ==
Airlines	Destinations
Sichuan Airlines	Chengdu–Tianfu, Hangzhou
Tianjin Airlines	Huizhou, Xi'an

== See also ==
- List of airports in China
