= Grand China Air =

Chinese airline

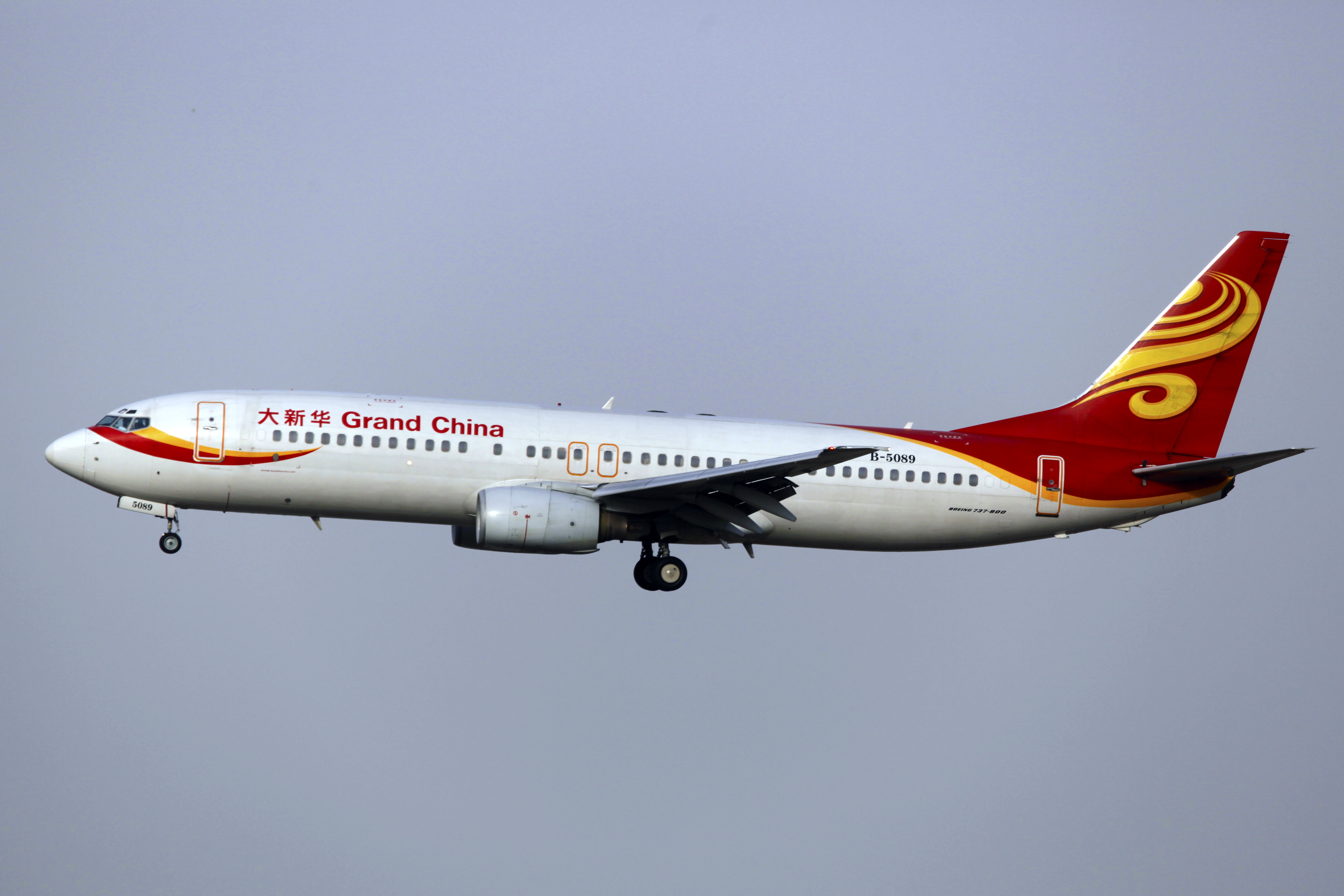
IATA	ICAO	Call sign
CN	GDC	GRAND CHINA
- Founded: 2007; 19 years ago
- Frequent-flyer program: Fortune Wings Club
- Subsidiaries: Air Changan; Tianjin Airlines
- Fleet size: 3
- Parent company: HNA Aviation
- Headquarters: Beijing, China

Grand China Air
- Simplified Chinese: 大新华航空
- Traditional Chinese: 大新華航空
Transcriptions
Standard Mandarin
- Hanyu Pinyin: Dà Xīn Huá Hángkōng

Grand China Air is a Chinese airline based at Haikou Meilan International Airport.

== History ==
Grand China Air was formed on 29 November 2007 under the initiative of the HNA group's largest operational entity, Hainan Airlines, to merge its operations with HNA Group's subsidiaries Shanxi Airlines, Chang An Airlines, and China Xinhua Airlines. The airline is headquartered in Beijing and registered in Hainan Province. As of 14 April 2012 only one of its 737-800s have been fitted with winglets.

Grand China Air was owned by 23 shareholders. The top 5 shareholders were Hainan Development Holdings (24.97%), HNA Group (23.11%), Starstep (9.57%), Haikou Meilan International Airport (8.30%) and Shenhua Group (5.56%). It was reported that George Soros was a minority shareholder It was reported that Starstep was still owned by Soros. Former associate of Soros, Bharat Bhisé, via Pan-American Aviation Holdings, owned 4.00% stake of Grand China Air as the 8th largest shareholder (in 2015 Pan-American was acquired by Jun Guan); Pan-American Aviation Holdings was a minority shareholder of HNA Group indirectly.

=== U.S. sanctions ===
In January 2021, the United States government named Grand China Air as a company "owned or controlled" by the People's Liberation Army and thereby prohibited any American company or individual from investing in it.

== Destinations ==
Grand China Air will serve the same destinations as Hainan Airlines.

== Fleet ==
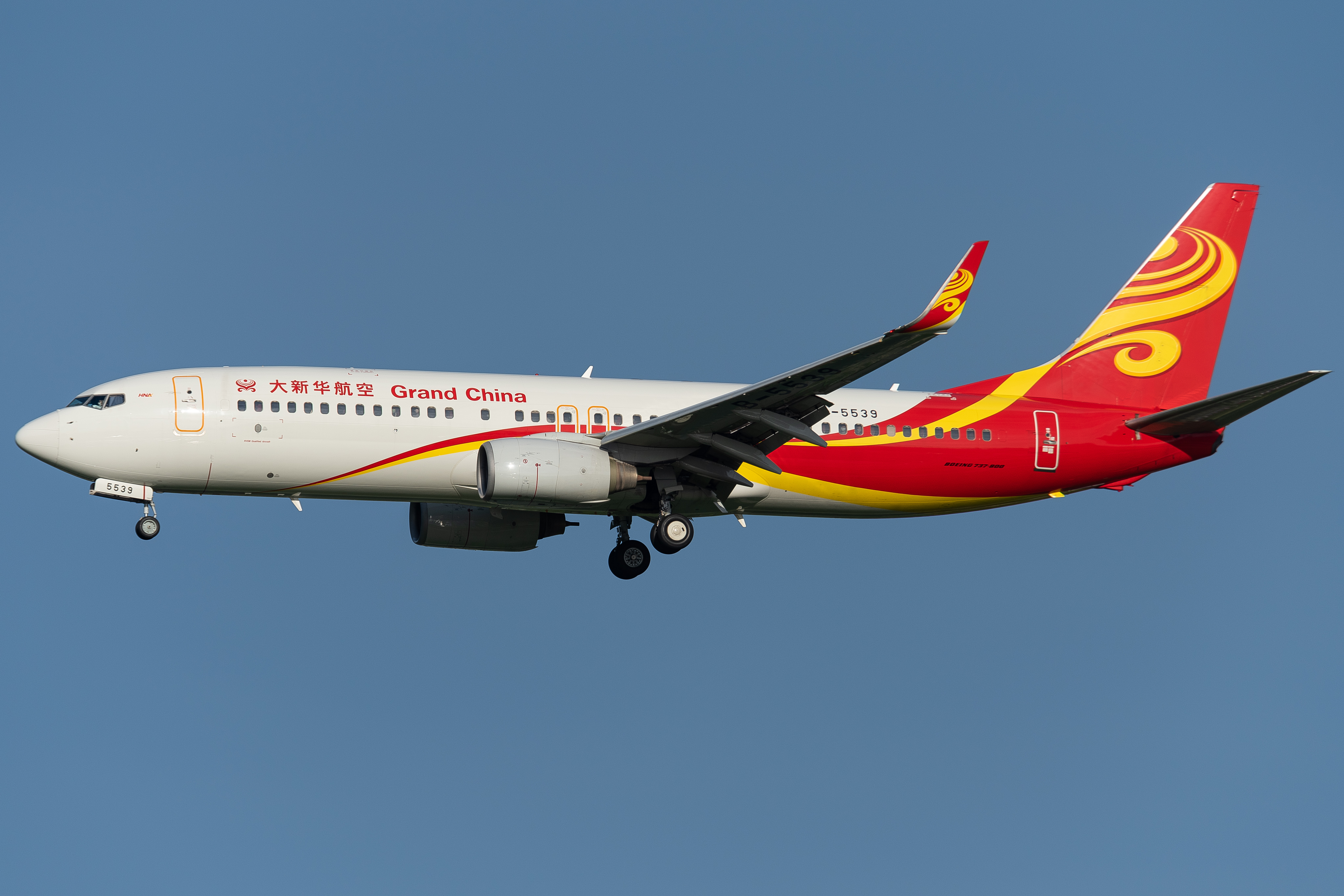
Grand China Air Boeing 737-800 in 2020

=== Current fleet ===
As of August 2025, Grand China Air operates an all-Boeing 737-800 fleet composed of the following aircraft:

Grand China Air fleet
Aircraft	In Fleet	Orders	Passengers			Notes
Aircraft	In Fleet	Orders	F	Y	Total	Notes
Boeing 737-800	3	–	8	156	164	

=== Former fleet ===
The airline previously operated the following aircraft (as of August 2018):

- Boeing 737-300
