= Bohai Trust =

Chinese investment management company

Bohai International Trust
- Trade name: Bohai Trust
- Formerly: Hebei International Trust Investment
- Company type: Subsidiary
- Industry: Financial services
- Founded: December 1983
- Headquarters: Shijiazhuang, Hebei, China
- Area served: mainland China
- Services: investment management; trust
- Revenue: ▼CN¥1.070 billion (2015)
- Operating income: ▼CN¥679 million (2015)
- Net income: ▼CN¥549 million (2015)
- AUM: CN¥216.173 billion (2015)
- Total assets: ▲CN¥4.848 billion (2015)
- Total equity: ▲CN¥4.234 billion (2015)
Owner
HNA Group	(77.90%)
Xinhua Airlines	(22.10%)
- Parent: HNA Group
- Website: bohaitrust.com
- Footnotes / references source

Bohai International Trust
- Simplified Chinese: 渤海国际信托
Transcriptions

Bohai Trust
- Simplified Chinese: 渤海信托
Transcriptions

Bohai International Trust Co., Ltd. (BITC) known as just Bohai Trust, is a Chinese investment management company based in Shijiazhuang, Hebei Province. The company has licensed to create trust (as private equity fund). The company is a subsidiary of HNA Group for 51.23% shares (via HNA Capital), plus additional 22.10% shares via China Xinhua Airlines, a subsidiary (83.39%) of Hainan Airlines. Hainan Airlines, a listed company, is partially owned by HNA Group. The remain 26.67% shares of the trust company were owned by another subsidiary of HNA Group (Chinese: 海南海航实业控股; lit. 'Hainan HNA Industrial Holding'), which the group owned 72.98% stake of that subsidiary directly and indirectly (via Chinese: 海航实业集团; lit. 'HNA Industrial Group').

== History ==
The predecessor of the trust company was founded in December 1983 as Hebei International Trust Investment Corporation (Chinese: 河北省国际信托投资公司). In 2004 the company was re-registered as Hebei International Trust & Investment Co., Ltd. (Chinese: 河北省国际信托投资有限责任公司), which Hebei Provincial State-owned Assets Supervision and Administration Commission was the largest shareholder for 95.24% stake. In 2006 it was acquired by HNA Group from Hebei Provincial People's Government; the share capital of the company had increased to CN¥2 billion in 2010 and to CN¥3.6 billion in 2016. The company also changed from "company limited by quote/stake" to "company limited by shares" (analog to public limited company) in 2015.

In 2012 China Xinhua Airlines also acquired the minority stake (795.65 million shares) from HNA Hospitality Group, Tangla Hotel Beijing, Haikou Meilan International Airport Co., Ltd. and 2 sister companies, for a total price of CN¥2.761 billion (CN¥3.47 per share). China Xinhua Airlines did not subscribed the 2016 capital increase of the trust company, making the shares were diluted to 22.10%.

In November 2017, Bohai Trust was sued for failing to pay the collective funds trust plan for the Bohai Trust Ningbo Weitong Investment Project, which was originally scheduled to expire on July 27, 2017.
