= Okay Airways =

Chinese airline

Okay Airways 奥凯航空公司

- Boeing 737-800 of Okay Airways
IATA	ICAO	Call sign
BK	OKA	OKAYJET
- Founded: June 2004; 22 years ago
- Commenced operations: 11 March 2005; 21 years ago
- Hubs: Tianjin; Xi'an
- Secondary hubs: Changsha
- Frequent-flyer program: Lucky Clouds Club
- Fleet size: 21
- Destinations: 50
- Parent company: Okay Airways Ltd.
- Headquarters: Daxing, Beijing, China
- Key people: Liu Jieyin (CEO)
- Website: www.okair.net

Okay Airways, styled as OK AIR, is an airline headquartered in Daxing District, Beijing, China. It operates passenger flight services and dedicated cargo services. Its main hubs are Tianjin Binhai International Airport and Xi'an Xianyang International Airport, with a secondary hub at Changsha Huanghua International Airport.

== History ==
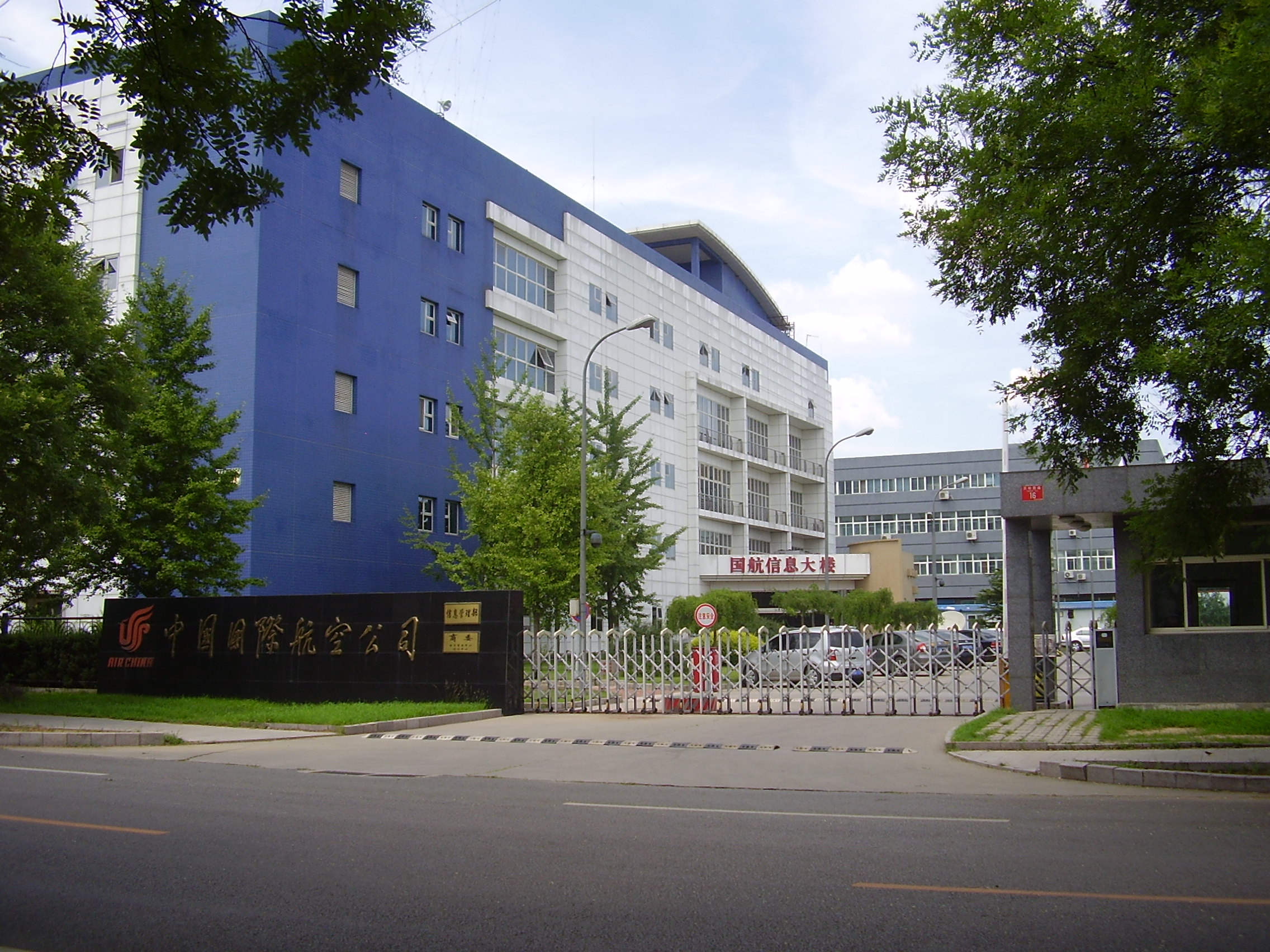
Former Okay Airways headquarters in an Air China facility

Okay Airways was established in June 2004 and in February 2005 received an aviation carrier business license from the Civil Aviation Administration of China (CAAC). It is China's first private sector airline. The carrier's maiden flight from its base in Tianjin to Changsha was on 11 March 2005, with 81 people on board. Okay Airways leased three Boeing 737-300F aircraft and started cargo services as a local partner of FedEx Express in March 2007.

Flights were suspended for one month beginning on 15 December 2008, due to a dispute between the carrier and its shareholders.

== Corporate affairs ==
It is headquartered in Daxing District, Beijing.

Previously it was headquartered in an Air China office facility in Zone A of the Tianzhu Industrial Zone of Shunyi District, Beijing, and before in Fengtai District, Beijing.

== Destinations ==
As of July 2024, Okay Airways flies (or has flown) to the following destinations:

Country	City	Airport	Notes	Refs
China	Changsha	Changsha Huanghua International Airport	Secondary Hub	
China	Chaoyang	Chaoyang Airport		
China	Chengdu	Chengdu Shuangliu International Airport		
China	Chongqing	Chongqing Jiangbei International Airport		
China	Dalian	Dalian Zhoushuizi International Airport		
China	Guangzhou	Guangzhou Baiyun International Airport		
China	Guilin	Guilin Liangjiang International Airport		
China	Guiyang	Guiyang Longdongbao International Airport		
China	Haikou	Haikou Meilan International Airport		
China	Hangzhou	Hangzhou Xiaoshan International Airport		
China	Harbin	Harbin Taiping International Airport		
China	Hefei	Hefei Xinqiao International Airport		
China	Heihe	Heihe Airport		
China	Jiagedaqi	Jiagedaqi Airport		
China	Jiamusi	Jiamusi Dongjiao Airport		
China	Jining	Jining Qufu Airport		
China	Jixi	Jixi Xingkaihu Airport		
China	Kunming	Kunming Changshui International Airport		
China	Lanzhou	Lanzhou Zhongchuan International Airport		
China	Libo	Libo Airport		
China	Liping	Liping Airport		
China	Mohe	Mohe Gulian Airport		
China	Nanjing	Nanjing Lukou International Airport		
China	Ningbo	Ningbo Lishe International Airport		
China	Qingdao	Qingdao Jiaodong International Airport		
China	Qingdao	Qingdao Liuting International Airport	Airport Closed	
China	Quanzhou	Quanzhou Jinjiang International Airport		
China	Sanya	Sanya Phoenix International Airport		
China	Shanghai	Shanghai Pudong International Airport		
China	Shenyang	Shenyang Taoxian International Airport		
China	Tianjin	Tianjin Binhai International Airport	Hub	
China	Tongren	Tongren Fenghuang Airport		
China	Ürümqi	Ürümqi Diwopu International Airport		
China	Wuyishan	Wuyishan Airport		
China	Xiamen	Xiamen Gaoqi International Airport		
China	Xi'an	Xi'an Xianyang International Airport	Hub	
China	Xining	Xining Caojiabao International Airport		
China	Yanji	Yanji Chaoyangchuan International Airport		
China	Yantai	Yantai Penglai International Airport		
China	Yongzhou	Yongzhou Lingling Airport		
China	Yulin	Yulin Yuyang Airport		
China	Zhangjiajie	Zhangjiajie Hehua International Airport		
China	Zhanjiang	Zhanjiang Airport		
China	Zhuhai	Zhuhai Jinwan Airport		
Indonesia	Denpasar	Ngurah Rai International Airport		
Japan	Aomori	Aomori Airport		
Japan	Hakodate	Hakodate Airport		
Japan	Osaka	Kansai International Airport		
Japan	Tokyo	Haneda Airport		
Philippines	Cebu	Mactan–Cebu International Airport	Terminated	
Philippines	Kalibo	Kalibo International Airport		
South Korea	Daegu	Daegu International Airport ^{Seasonal}	Terminated	
South Korea	Jeju	Jeju International Airport		
Thailand	Bangkok	Suvarnabhumi Airport		
Thailand	Krabi	Krabi International Airport		
Thailand	Phuket	Phuket International Airport		
Vietnam	Da Nang	Da Nang International Airport		
Vietnam	Phu Quoc	Phu Quoc International Airport		

== Fleet ==
Okay Airways Boeing 737-900ER

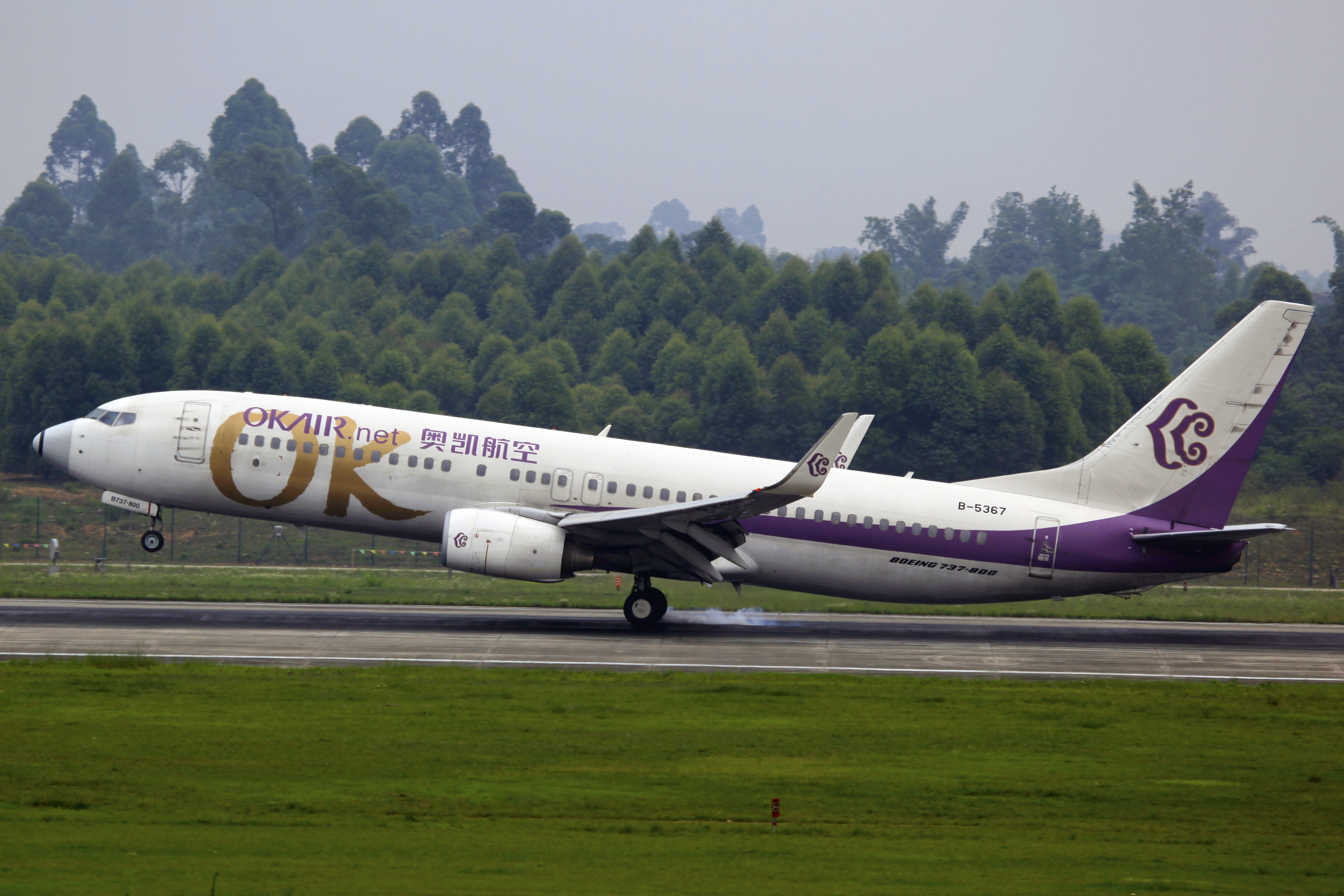
Okay Airways Boeing 737-800 in former livery

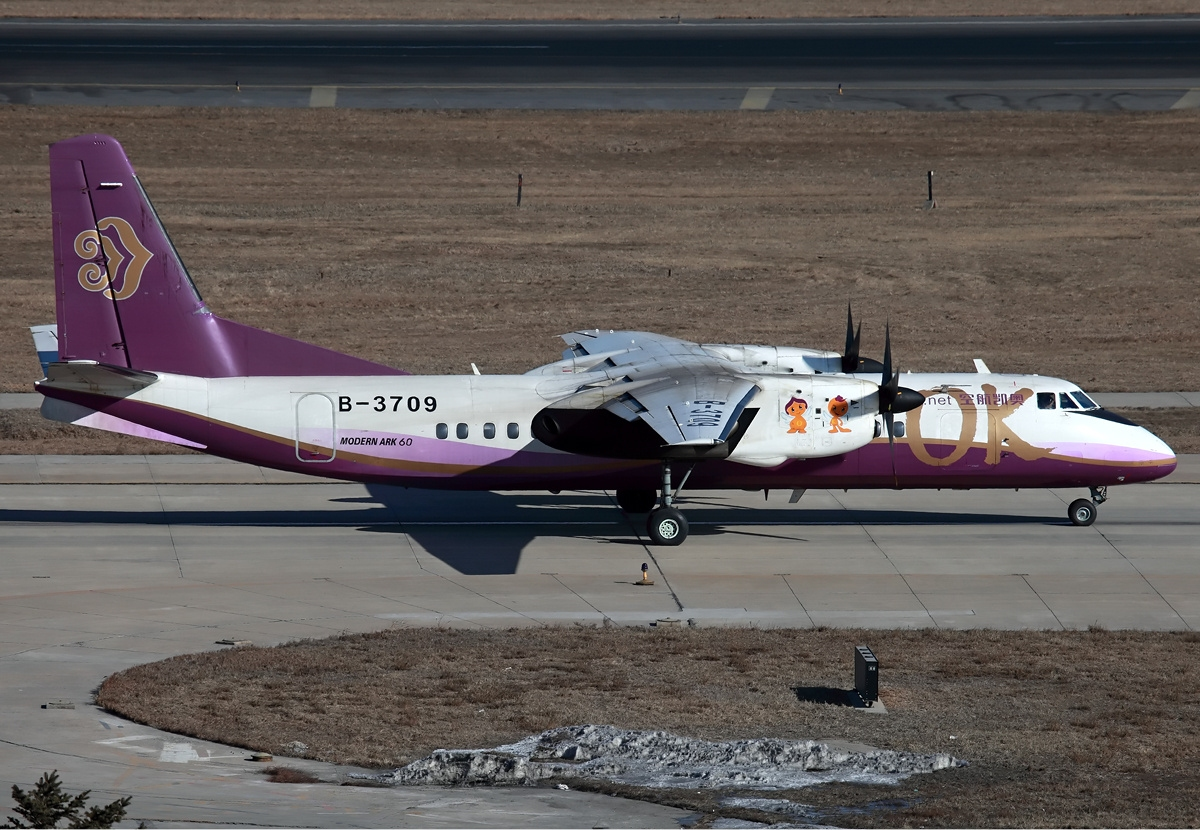
Okay Airways Xi'an MA60 in former livery

=== Current fleet ===
As of July 2024, Okay Airways operates an all-Boeing fleet composed of the following aircraft:

Okay Airways Fleet
Aircraft	In Fleet	Orders	Passengers	Notes
Boeing 737-800	15	—	177	
Boeing 737-900ER	6	2	200	
Boeing 737 MAX 10	—	8	TBA	
Boeing 787	—	1	TBA	
Xi'an MA700	__	30	TBA	Launch Customer
Okay Airways Cargo fleet
Boeing 737-400SF	—	2	Cargo	To be leased from Air Transport Services Group
Total	21	23		

=== Fleet development ===
In June 2017, the airline announced an order for 15 Boeing 737 MAX aircraft consisting of 7 737 MAX 8 and 8 737 MAX 10. In November 2017, the airline signed a firm order for 5 Boeing 787-9 aircraft.

Okay Airways used to have a regional fleet of 13 Xian MA-60. With the establishment of the new Joy Air on October 30, 2016, the regional fleet of Okay Airways (all the 13 Xian MA60) has been transferred to Joy Air.

=== Former fleet ===
The airline previously operated the following aircraft (as of August 2018):

- 2 further Boeing 737-800
- 2 Boeing 737-8 MAX
