= Jining Da'an Airport =

Jining Da'an Airport 济宁大安机场
- IATA: JNG; ICAO: ZSJG

Summary
- Airport type: Public
- Serves: Jining, Shandong, China
- Opened: 28 December 2023
- Hub for: GX Airlines
- Coordinates: 35°38′49″N 116°44′39″E

Map
- Location of airport in Shandong

Runways
Direction	Length		Surface
Direction	m	ft	Surface
09/27	2,800	9,186

Statistics (2025)
- Passengers: 1,503,617
- Cargo: 2,602.0
- Aircraft movements: 12,738

Jining Da'an Airport
- Simplified Chinese: 济宁大安机场
- Traditional Chinese: 濟寧大安機場
Transcriptions
Standard Mandarin
- Hanyu Pinyin: Jìníng Dà'ān Jīchǎng

Jining Da'an Airport (IATA: JNG, ICAO: ZSJG) is an airport located in Yanzhou district, Jining City, Shandong Province, East China. Jining Da'an Airport opened on December 28, 2023, replacing the Jining Qufu Airport.

== History ==
The history of Jining Da'an Airport can be traced back to the Jining Airport and Jining Qufu Airport periods.

=== Jining Airport ===
Jining Qufu Airport is a joint military-civilian airport located in Zhifang Town, Jiaxiang County, 24 kilometers southwest of Jining City. The Jining Air Force Airport is a Class I permanent military airport, originally built in 1971 and still in use today. It has complete runways and various support facilities and is operating well. After its initial construction, the airport was named Jiaxiang Airport, and in 1983 it was renamed Jining Airport. On February 20, 1997, it was approved by the State Council and the Central Military Commission to be used for both military and civilian purposes. In 2008, the Civil Aviation Administration of China approved the airport's name as Jining Qufu Airport, and it opened to traffic on December 28 of the same year.

=== Jining Qufu Airport ===
Since its opening on December 28, 2008, Jining Qufu Airport has opened routes to five major hubs: Beijing, Shanghai, Guangzhou, Chengdu, and Shenyang. The earliest route to Guangzhou opened on December 28, 2008, followed by routes to Beijing and Shanghai on April 6, 2009. Chengdu and Shenyang routes opened on November 1 of the same year. On October 31 of this year, with the opening of two new routes to Chongqing and Wuhan, Jining Qufu Airport has initially established an aviation network connecting multiple popular domestic cities.

Jining Qufu Airport was closed for runway maintenance on April 30, 2020, and was scheduled to resume operations on August 1. However, due to delay in construction works, the airport closure was extended to August 31, 2020 and the airport resumed operations on September 1.

As Jining Qufu Airport is an important feeder airport in Shandong Province, its dual-use military and civilian airport model presents certain conflicts. To resolve these conflicts, preliminary work on relocating the civilian portion of Jining Airport began in 2014. The site selection report and flight procedure report were completed in February 2015. In December of the same year, the Civil Aviation Administration of China approved the relocation site selection for Jining Airport. In November 2017, the feasibility study report was submitted to the State Council and the Central Military Commission for approval. On January 7, 2019, the State Council and the Central Military Commission jointly approved the feasibility study report for the Jining Airport relocation project, marking a breakthrough in the preliminary work.

=== Jining Da'an Airport ===
Jining Airport is a key project promoted by the Civil Aviation Administration of China and the Shandong Provincial People's Government in 2020, and an important component of Shandong's air transport cluster. On October 26, the Shandong Provincial Department of Transportation and the East China Civil Aviation Administration jointly approved the preliminary design and budget for Jining Airport, marking the completion of all preliminary work and the official commencement of the full-scale construction phase.

The new airport is located in Caohe Town, Yanzhou District, Shandong Province, covering an area of 2,909 mu (approximately 193 hectares), with an estimated investment of 2.36 billion yuan. The first phase plan was to build a 4C-level airport, with long-term plans to upgrade it to a 4E-level airport in the future. Major construction projects include: a 2,800-meter-long and 45-meter-wide runway equipped with 16 passenger aircraft parking positions, 1 de-icing parking position, and 1 isolated parking position; and 285,900 square meters of flight area paving. The project included a 29,700-square-meter terminal building and a 15,800-square-meter integrated building, as well as supporting facilities such as air traffic control, cargo handling, and fuel supply.

On May 14, 2023, Jining Da'an Airport conducted its first flight calibration after commencing operations. This signifies that Jining Da'an Airport has officially entered a new phase, moving from "being built" to "being operational." It is understood that Jining Da'an Airport is located in Yanzhou District and is a 4C-class domestic feeder airport, a relocated section of the civil aviation portion of Jining Qufu Airport.

According to the plan, the first phase of the project would enable the airport to handle 2.6 million passengers and 7,000 tons of cargo by 2025; the near-term target year was 2035, with a projected passenger throughput of 6 million and cargo throughput of 40,000 tons; the long-term target year was 2050, with a projected passenger throughput of 14 million and cargo and mail throughput of 100,000 tons.

In 2025, the actual passenger volume was 1,503,617 and the cargo throughput was 2,602 tons — both far below the planned targets.

== Airlines and destinations ==
Airlines	Destinations
Air Guilin	Guilin, Harbin
Air Travel	Kunming
China Express Airlines	Chengdu–Tianfu, Fuzhou, Quzhou, Zhoushan
China Southern Airlines	Guangzhou, Shenzhen
GX Airlines	Changsha, Chongqing, Guiyang, Hohhot, Nanning, Ordos, Sanya, Shenyang, Yantai
LJ Air	Harbin, Huizhou
Tianjin Airlines	Nanchang, Yulin (Shaanxi)

== See also ==
- List of airports in China
- List of the busiest airports in China
