= Hefei Xinqiao International Airport =

Airport serving Hefei, Anhui, China

Hefei Xinqiao International Airport 合肥新桥国际机场
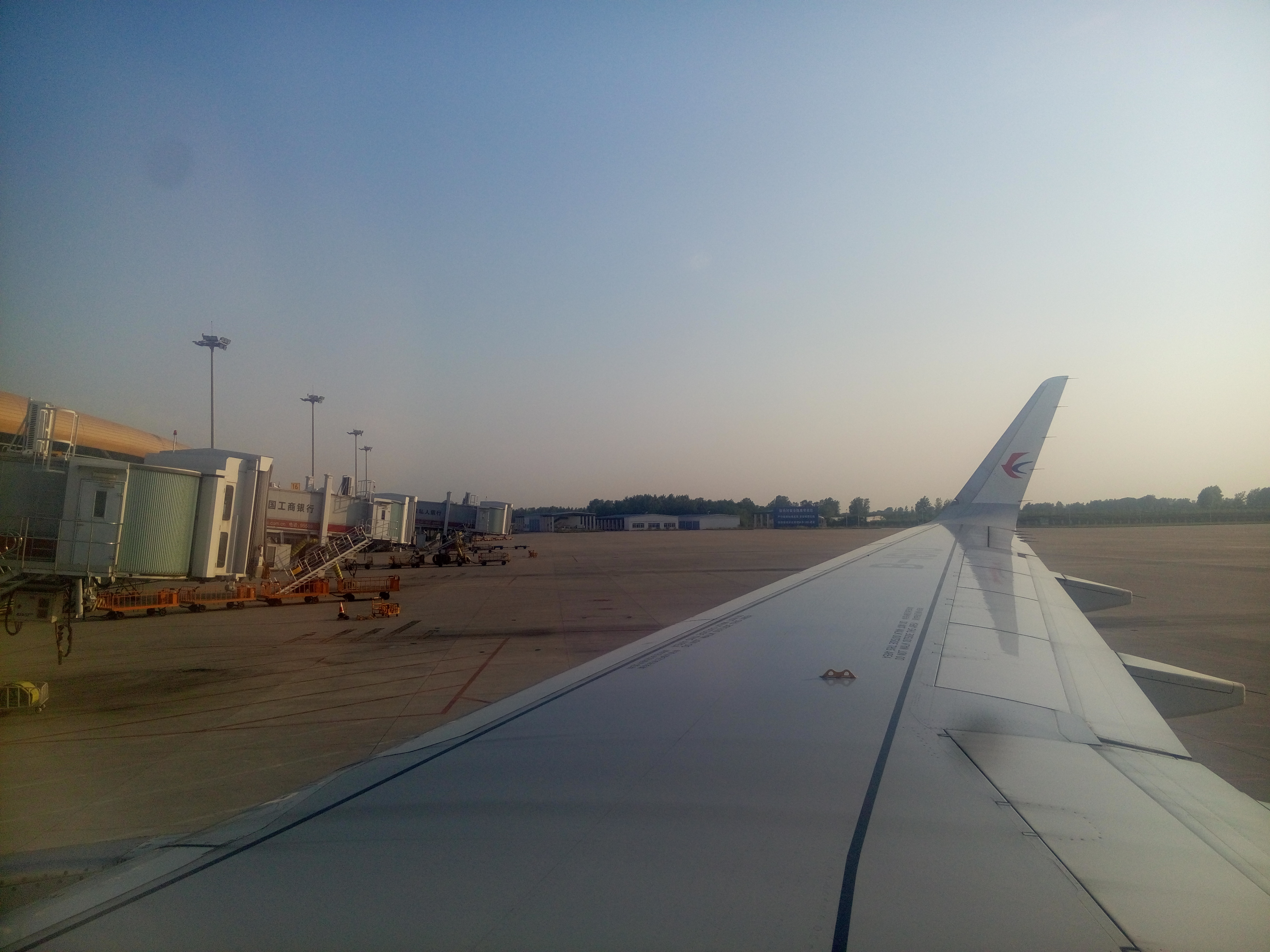
- Apron of Hefei Xinqiao International Airport
- IATA: HFE; ICAO: ZSOF

Summary
- Airport type: Public
- Operator: Anhui Civil Aviation Airport Group Co. Ltd.
- Serves: Hefei
- Location: Shushan, Hefei, Anhui, China
- Opened: 30 May 2013; 13 years ago
- Focus city for: China Eastern Airlines
- Elevation AMSL: 63 m (207 ft)
- Coordinates: 31°59′12″N 116°58′30″E
- Website: www.hfairport.com

Maps
- CAAC airport chart
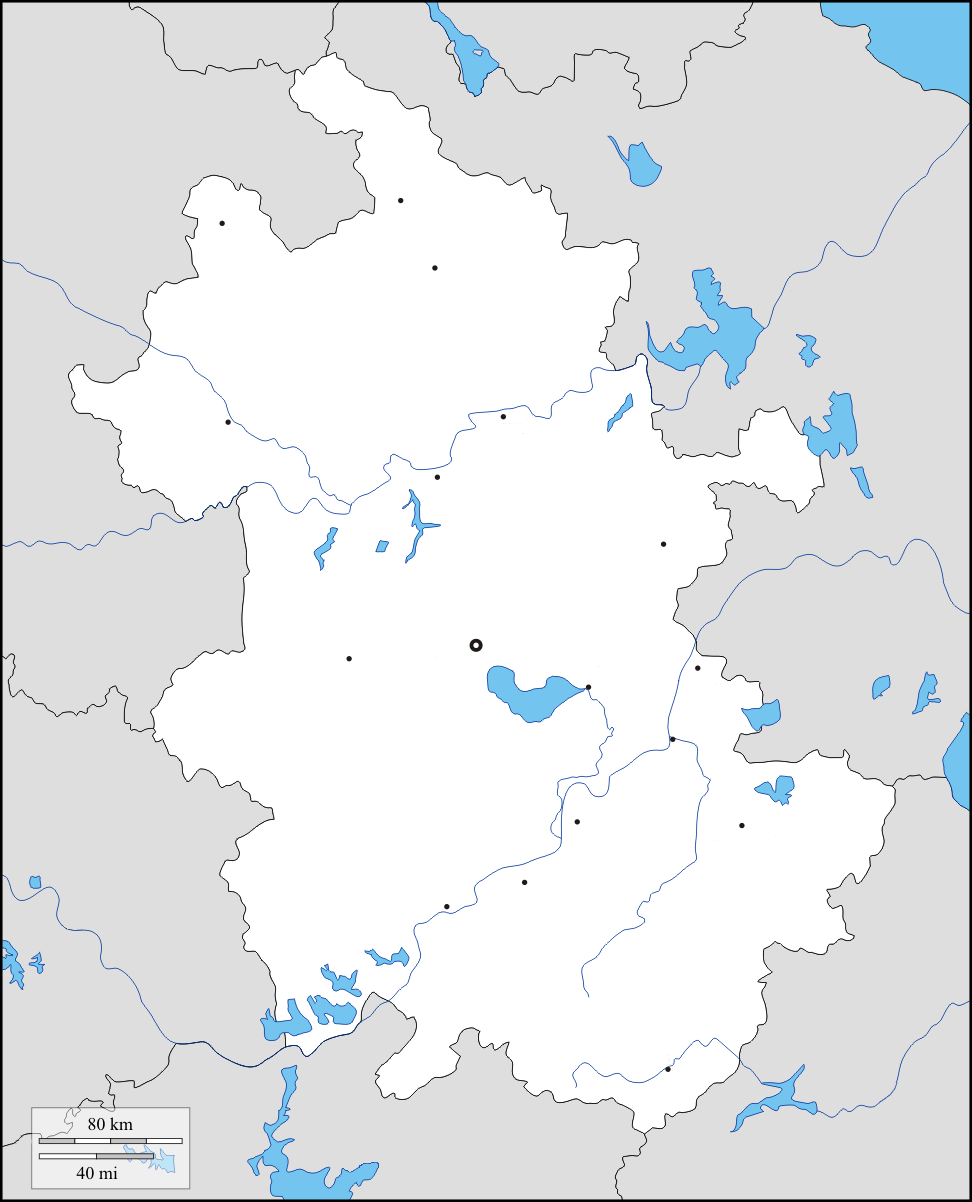
- Location in Anhui Location in China

Runways
Direction	Length		Surface
Direction	m	ft	Surface
15/33	3,400	11,155	Concrete

Statistics (2025)
- Passengers: 12,644,989
- Aircraft movements: 97,281
- Tonnes of cargo: 136,493.3
- Source; List of the busiest airports in the People's Republic of China

Hefei Xinqiao International Airport
- Simplified Chinese: 合肥新桥国际机场
- Traditional Chinese: 合肥新橋國際機場
Transcriptions
Standard Mandarin
- Hanyu Pinyin: Héféi Xīnqiáo Guójì Jīchǎng

Hefei Xinqiao International Airport (IATA: HFE, ICAO: ZSOF) is an international airport serving Hefei, the capital of East China's Anhui province. It is located in Shushan District, 31.8 km (19.8 mi) from the city center. Construction started in December 2008 with a total investment of 3.728 billion yuan. Opened on 30 May 2013, it replaced Hefei Luogang Airport as Hefei's main airport. According to the Civil Aviation Administration of China, in 2025, Hefei Xinqiao International Airport recorded 97,281 flight takeoffs and landings, and 12,645 million passenger movements, representing a year-on-year increases of -1.4% and 1.3% respectively.

In December 2022, Hefei gained direct flights to Europe when Condor started flights to Frankfurt in Germany, but this route has been discontinued after just a few months.

== Facilities ==
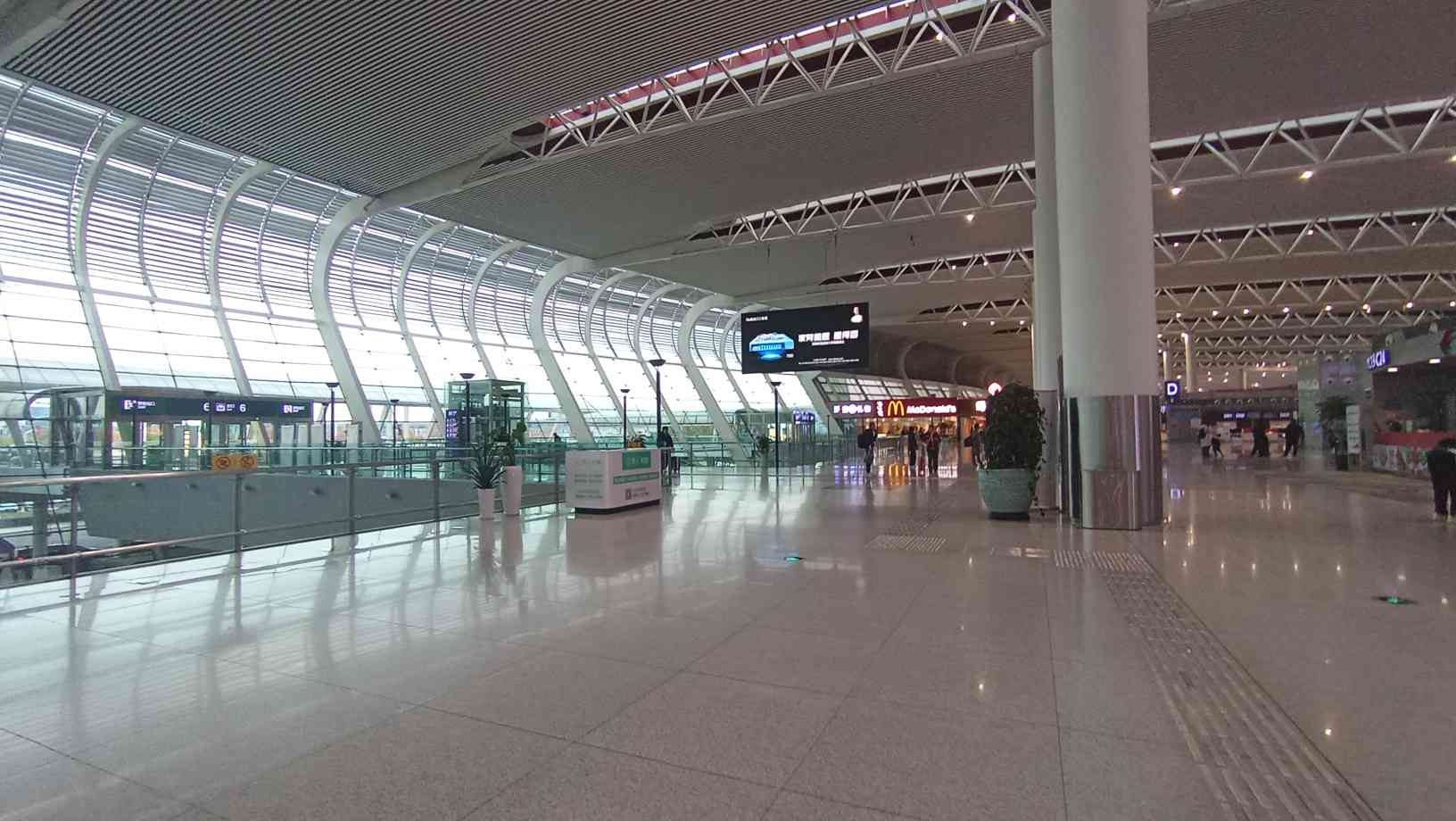
Departure Hall

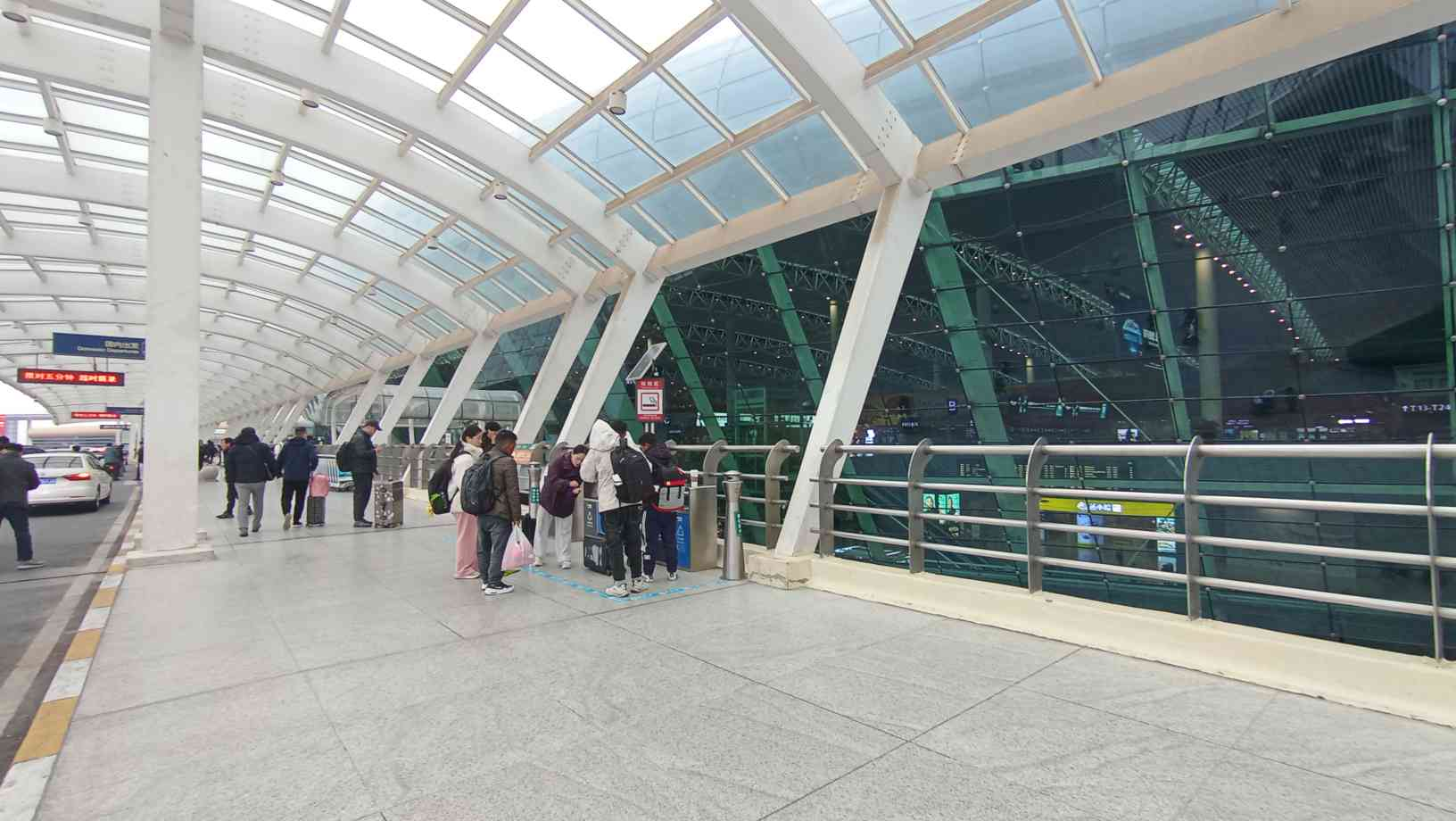
Exterior of Xinqiao Airport

The first phase of construction includes one runway which is 3,400 meters (11,200 ft) long and 45 meters (148 ft) wide (class 4E), and a 108,500-meter (356,000 ft) terminal building, to handle a projected annual volume of 11 million passengers and 150,000 tons of cargo by 2020. A second phase is being planned to handle 42 million passengers and 580,000 tons of cargo by 2040.

== Airlines and destinations ==
=== Passenger ===
Airlines	Destinations
Air China	Beijing–Capital, Chengdu–Shuangliu, Chengdu–Tianfu, Chongqing
Beijing Capital Airlines	Hohhot, Sanya
Chengdu Airlines	Chengdu–Tianfu, Harbin, Sanya, Shenyang
China Eastern Airlines	Beijing–Daxing, Chengdu–Tianfu, Chongqing, Dalian, Datong, Dunhuang, Fuzhou, Ganzhou, Guangzhou, Guilin, Guiyang, Harbin, Hohhot, Hong Kong, Hotan, Huizhou, Jieyang Kunming, Lanzhou, Macau, Nanning, Ordos, Qingdao, Quanzhou, Shanghai–Pudong, Shijiazhuang, Singapore, Taiyuan, Ürümqi, Weihai, Xiamen, Xi'an, Xining, Xishuangbanna, Yantai, Yinchuan, Yuncheng, Zhanjiang
China Southern Airlines	Beijing–Daxing, Guangzhou, Shenzhen, Ürümqi, Zhuhai
Colorful Guizhou Airlines	Guiyang, Libo, Tongren, Xichang, Xingyi
Donghai Airlines	Xishuangbanna
Hainan Airlines	Changchun, Dalian, Guangzhou, Haikou, Sanya, Shenyang, Taiyuan, Xiamen, Zhuhai
Korean Air	Seoul–Incheon
LJ Air	Harbin, Zhuhai
Lucky Air	Dali, Kunming, Zunyi–Xinzhou
Okay Airways	Kunming, Nanning, Tianjin
Qingdao Airlines	Changchun, Guiyang, Lijiang, Nanning, Qingdao
Ruili Airlines	Mangshi
Shandong Airlines	Guilin, Guiyang, Nanning, Qingdao
Shanghai Airlines	Changchun, Liuzhou
Shenzhen Airlines	Changchun, Chengdu–Tianfu, Guangzhou, Harbin, Mianyang, Nanning, Quanzhou, Shenyang, Shenzhen, Taiyuan, Xi'an, Yibin, Zhuhai
Sichuan Airlines	Chengdu–Shuangliu, Chengdu–Tianfu, Chongqing, Kunming
Spring Airlines	Jieyang, Lanzhou, Shenyang, Yining
Thai Lion Air	Bangkok–Don Mueang
West Air	Chengdu–Tianfu, Chongqing, Guiyang, Hohhot, Kunming, Lhasa, Shenzhen
XiamenAir	Quanzhou, Xiamen, Yinchuan, Yuncheng
Xizang Airlines	Chengdu–Shuangliu, Dali, Guangyuan, Nyingchi

=== Cargo ===
Airlines	Destinations
Air Incheon	Seoul–Incheon
Kalitta Air	Anchorage
Shandong Airlines Cargo	Qingdao

== See also ==
- List of the busiest airports in China
- List of airports in China
