= Daxinganling =

Daxinganling, Da Xing'an Ling, etc. may refer to

- Greater Khingan range (Daxinganling Mountains)
- Daxing'anling Prefecture
- Daxing'anling Oroqen Airport
