= JGD =

JGD may refer to:

- JGD, the IATA code for Jiagedaqi Airport, Heilongjiang Province, China
- JGD, the station code for Greenwood railway station, Perth, Western Australia, Australia
