= Harbin Taiping International Airport =

Airport serving Harbin, Heilongjiang, China

Harbin Taiping International Airport 哈尔滨太平国际机场
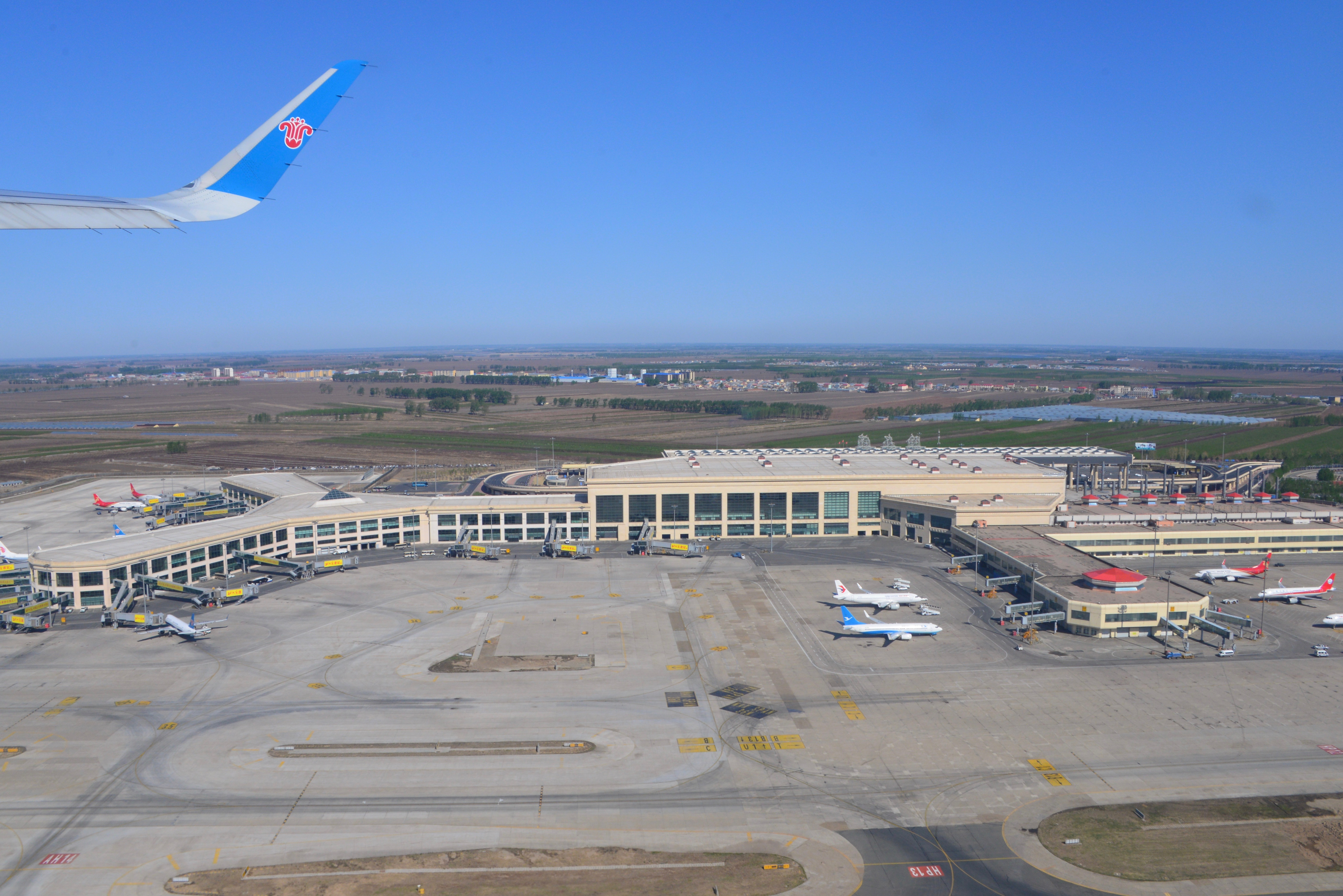
- IATA: HRB; ICAO: ZYHB

Summary
- Airport type: Public
- Operator: Civil Government
- Serves: Harbin
- Location: Taiping, Daoli, Harbin, Heilongjiang, China
- Opened: 1979; 47 years ago
- Hub for: China Southern Airlines
- Focus city for: China Eastern Airlines; Sichuan Airlines
- Elevation AMSL: 139 m (456 ft)
- Coordinates: 45°37′24.25″N 126°15′01.18″E
- Website: www.hljairport.com.cn (in Chinese)

Maps
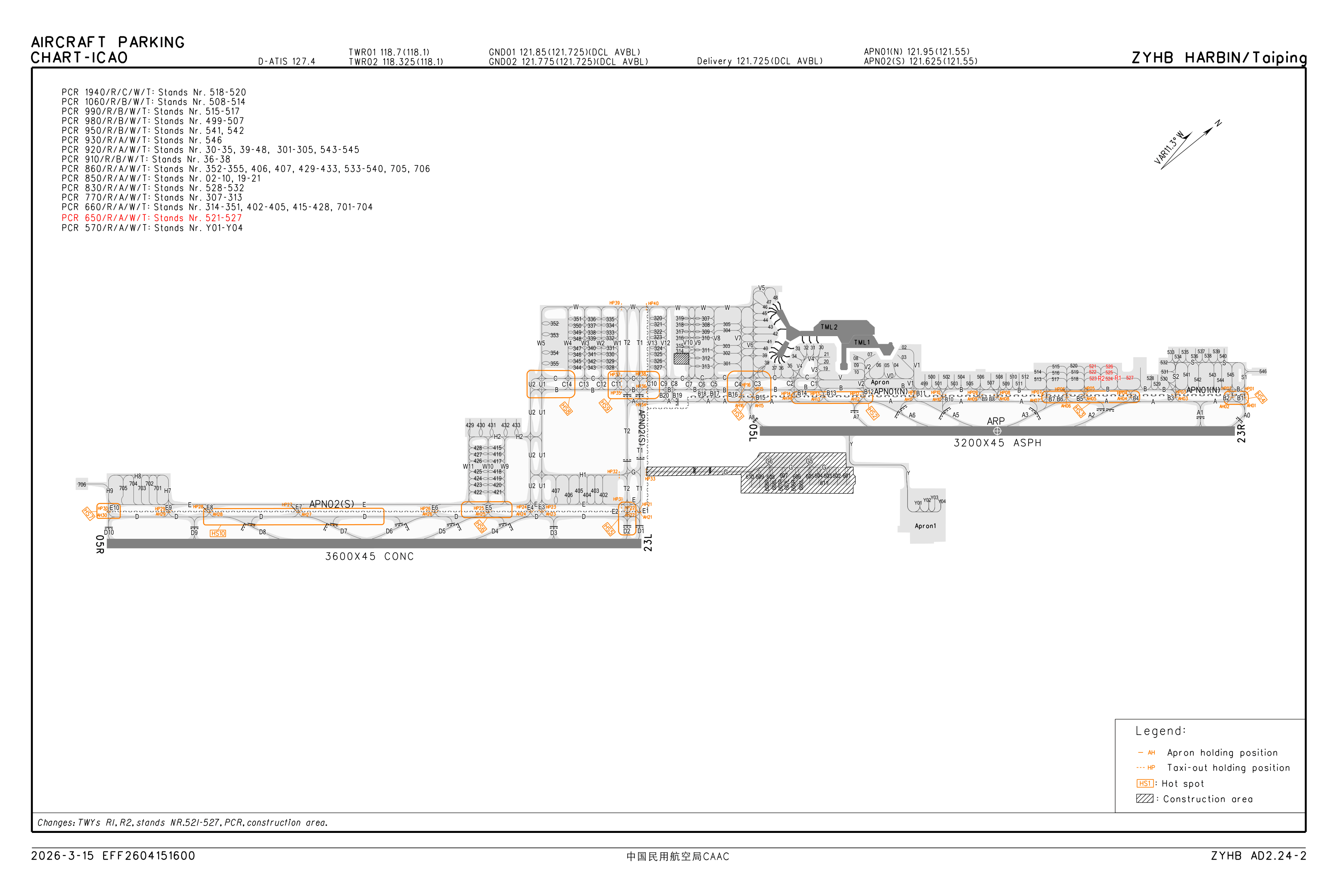
- CAAC airport chart

- Location in Heilongjiang Location in China

Runways
Direction	Length		Surface
Direction	m	ft	Surface
05L/23R	3,200	10,499	Asphalt
05R/23L	3,600	11,811	Concrete

Statistics (2025)
- Passengers: 24,650,717 ▲3.6%
- Aircraft movement: 162,548 ▲1.6%
- Cargo (Tonnes): 149,257.8 ▲6.1%
- Source: China's busiest airports by passenger traffic

Harbin Taiping International Airport
- Simplified Chinese: 哈尔滨太平国际机场
- Traditional Chinese: 哈爾濱太平國際機場
Transcriptions
Standard Mandarin
- Hanyu Pinyin: Hārbīn Tàipíng Guójì Jīchǎng

Harbin Taiping International Airport (IATA: HRB, ICAO: ZYHB) is an international airport serving Harbin, the capital of Northeast China's Heilongjiang province. The airport handled 24,650,717 passengers in 2025, making it the 22nd busiest airport in mainland China.

== History ==
Harbin Taiping Airport, formerly known as Yanjiagang Airport, is located about 37 kilometres (23 mi) southwest of the city of Harbin and was constructed in 1979 with further expansion between 1994 and 1997 for $960 million RMB. It replaced the old Harbin Majiagou Airport (哈尔滨马家沟机场) that was originally built by the Japanese in 1931. In 1984, Taiping was upgraded to an international airport and initially starterd international flights to Russia. Today it serves as an important transportation hub for the northeastern region of China and is the largest airport serving Heilongjiang province.

It is capable of handling 20 million passengers annually and currently has 97 destinations, 85 of which are domestic and 12 are international as of 2026.

In 2013, Harbin Taiping International Airport handled 10 million passengers. It is the 23rd airport in China that reached 10 million passengers per year.

In 2017, Harbin Taiping International Airport handled 18 million passengers, becoming the 21st busiest airport in mainland China.

To handle the growing number of passengers, the new Terminal 2 opened on 30 April 2018. This terminal is for domestic flights only. All international flights were moved to the old terminal, about 1 mile north of Terminal 2, which is being redeveloped to handle international flights.

== Facilities ==
=== Terminal ===
Harbin Airport was divided into two separate terminals, International and Domestic. On 22 May 2013, in order to build Terminal 2, International Departure and Arrival has been moved to a former terminal.

=== Runway ===
The airport has two runways: 05L/23R is 3,200 meters, and 05R/23L is 3,600 meters.

The first runway was opened in 1979 as 05/23. The second runway, 05R/23L, opened on January 23, 2025, as part of the expansion project. Therefore, the old runway 05/23 changed its headings to 05L/23R to form a two-runway system with the new runway.

== Airlines and destinations ==
=== Passenger ===
Airlines	Destinations
9 Air	Guangzhou, Guiyang, Nanjing, Ningbo, Shuozhou, Xinzhou
Aeroflot	Krasnoyarsk–International, Vladivostok
Air Chang'an	Xi'an
Air China	Beijing–Capital, Beijing–Daxing, Chengdu–Tianfu, Chongqing, Dongying, Fuyuan, Hangzhou, Jiansanjiang, Kunming, Shanghai–Pudong, Tianjin, Weihai, Wuhan
Air Guilin	Guilin, Jining, Xinzhou
Air Travel	Changsha, Wuxi
Asiana Airlines	Seoul–Incheon
Aurora	Khabarovsk, Vladivostok, Yuzhno-Sakhalinsk
Batik Air Malaysia	Seasonal: Kuala Lumpur–International
Beijing Capital Airlines	Anyang, Changsha, Fuyang, Guangzhou, Haikou, Hangzhou, Jinan, Kunming, Nanjing, Qingdao, Sanya, Shijiazhuang
Chengdu Airlines	Chengdu–Tianfu, Daqing, Fuyuan, Hefei, Heihe, Jiagedaqi, Jiamusi, Jixi, Khabarovsk, Mohe, Shijiazhuang, Vladivostok, Wudalianchi, Yichun (Heilongjiang)
China Eastern Airlines	Beijing–Daxing, Chengdu–Tianfu, Dalian, Guangzhou, Hefei, Heihe, Jiagedaqi, Kunming, Nanchang, Nanjing, Ningbo, Ordos, Qingdao, Shanghai–Hongqiao, Shanghai–Pudong, Taiyuan, Tokyo–Narita, Wuxi, Xi'an, Yinchuan, Zhuhai
China Express Airlines	Baotou, Lüliang, Xi'an, Xilinhot, Yulin (Shaanxi)
China Southern Airlines	Beijing–Daxing, Changsha, Chengdu–Tianfu, Chongqing, Guangzhou, Guiyang, Haikou, Hangzhou, Heihe, Hong Kong, Kunming, Mohe, Nanjing, Nanning, Ningbo, Qingdao, Sanya, Seoul–Incheon, Shanghai–Pudong, Shenzhen, Tokyo–Narita, Urumqi, Wuhan, Xiamen, Xi'an, Zhengzhou, Zhuhai; Seasonal: Vladivostok
China United Airlines	Beijing–Daxing, Wenzhou
Chongqing Airlines	Chongqing, Qingdao, Zhengzhou
Fuzhou Airlines	Anqing, Changsha, Changzhi, Fuzhou, Guiyang, Haikou, Hohhot, Huangshan, Qingdao, Sanya, Taizhou, Wuhan, Xiamen, Yichang, Zhengzhou, Zhoushan, Zunyi–Xinzhou
Grand China Air	Beijing–Capital, Wuhan
GX Airlines	Bozhou, Haikou, Hohhot, Nanning, Tianjin
Hainan Airlines	Beijing–Capital, Chongqing, Guangzhou, Haikou, Hangzhou, Jinan, Khabarovsk, Nanjing, Nanning, Qingdao, Qionghai, Sanya, Shenzhen, Tianjin, Xiamen, Xi'an, Xingtai
Hunnu Air	Ulaanbaatar
IrAero	Irkutsk, Petropavlovsk-Kamchatsky; Seasonal: Blagoveshchensk
Jeju Air	Seoul–Incheon
Jiangxi Air	Luoyang, Nanchang, Zhengzhou
Juneyao Air	Hangzhou, Huizhou, Nanjing, Sanya, Shanghai–Pudong, Wuxi
Kunming Airlines	Chengdu–Tianfu, Kunming
LJ Air	Changsha, Changzhi, Changzhou, Chongqing, Guiyang, Haikou, Hefei, Hohhot, Huizhou, Jining, Linfen, Luoyang, Ordos, Qingdao, Shenzhen, Shiyan, Taiyuan, Tianjin, Yinchuan, Zhanjiang, Zhuhai
Loong Air	Haikou, Handan, Hangzhou, Heze, Jiaxing, Ningbo, Sanya, Shenzhen, Weifang, Weihai, Wuhan, Xi'an, Xiangyang, Xuzhou, Zhuhai
Lucky Air	Bengbu, Chengdu–Tianfu, Ganzhou, Haikou, Kunming, Shijiazhuang, Xishuangbanna, Yancheng
Okay Airways	Changsha, Jinan, Yantai
Qingdao Airlines	Fuzhou, Ningbo, Qingdao, Weihai, Yantai
Ruili Airlines	Chengdu–Tianfu, Datong, Kunming, Nanyang, Tangshan
Shandong Airlines	Chengdu–Tianfu, Chongqing, Guiyang, Jinan, Nanning, Qingdao, Shanghai–Pudong, Tianjin, Wuyishan, Xiamen, Zhuhai
Shanghai Airlines	Shanghai–Pudong, Wenzhou
Shenzhen Airlines	Changsha, Changzhou, Chengdu–Tianfu, Guangzhou, Guiyang, Haikou, Hefei, Kunming, Linyi, Nanchang, Nanjing, Nanning, Nantong, Ningbo, Sanya, Shenzhen, Singapore, Wenzhou, Wuhan, Xiamen, Yangzhou, Yantai, Yuncheng, Zhengzhou
Sichuan Airlines	Beihai, Changsha, Chengdu–Shuangliu, Chengdu–Tianfu, Chongqing, Guangzhou, Guiyang, Haikou, Hangzhou, Jinan, Kunming, Lanzhou, Mianyang, Nanjing, Nanning, Sanya, Shanghai–Pudong, Tianjin, Wenzhou, Wuhan, Xi'an, Xishuangbanna, Xuzhou, Yantai, Zhengzhou
Spring Airlines	Hohhot, Huai'an, Jieyang, Lanzhou, Mohe, Ningbo, Shanghai–Pudong, Shenzhen, Shijiazhuang, Tonghua, Yangzhou
Spring Japan	Tokyo–Narita
Suparna Airlines	Zhengzhou
Thai AirAsia X	Seasonal: Bangkok–Don Mueang
Tianjin Airlines	Hohhot, Tianjin, Xi'an
Ural Airlines	Yekaterinburg
West Air	Nanchang, Qingdao, Sanya, Xuzhou, Zhengzhou
XiamenAir	Changsha, Fuzhou, Haikou, Hangzhou, Jinan, Lianyungang, Nanjing, Nantong, Qingdao, Quanzhou, Shenzhen, Tianjin, Xiamen, Yancheng, Zhengzhou
Xizang Airlines	Chengdu–Shuangliu, Taiyuan
Yakutia Airlines	Yakutsk

=== Cargo ===
Airlines	Destinations
Yakutia Airlines	Yakutsk

=== Destinations map ===
Destinations map
Destinations from Harbin Taiping International Airport within Heilongjiang

Destinations map
International (including HK/Macao/Taiwan) destinations from Harbin Taiping International Airport

== See also ==
- List of airports in China
