= FYJ =

FYJ may refer to:

- Fuyuan Dongji Airport, in Heilongjiang, China
- Frankford Yellow Jackets, an American football team
