= Daqing Sartu Airport =

Airport in Heilongjiang, China

Daqing Sartu Airport 大庆萨尔图机场
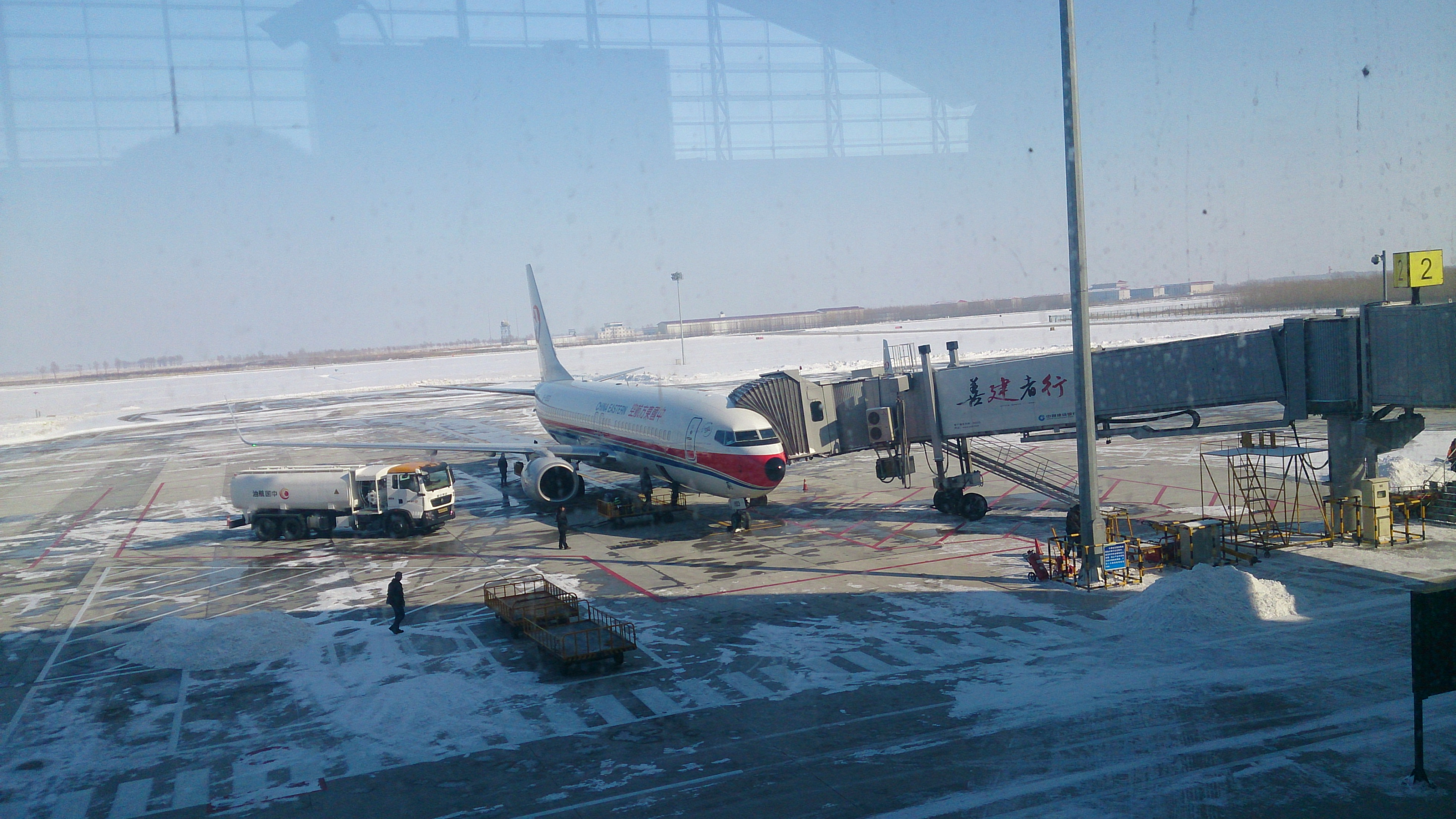
- IATA: DQA; ICAO: ZYDQ

Summary
- Airport type: Public
- Serves: Daqing, Heilongjiang, China
- Location: Sartu District, Daqing, Heilongjiang
- Opened: 1 September 2009; 16 years ago
- Coordinates: 46°44′47″N 125°07′56″E

Map
- Location of airport in Heilongjiang

Runways
Direction	Length		Surface
Direction	m	ft	Surface
17/35	2,600	8,530	Concrete

Statistics (2025)
- Passengers: 900,392
- Aircraft movements: 7,157
- Cargo (metric tons): 1,903.2

Daqing Sartu Airport
- Simplified Chinese: 大庆萨尔图机场
- Traditional Chinese: 大慶薩爾圖機場
Transcriptions
Standard Mandarin
- Hanyu Pinyin: Dàqìng Sà'ěrtú Jīchǎng

Daqing Saertu Airport (IATA: DQA, ICAO: ZYDQ) is an airport (class 4C) serving the city of Daqing in Heilongjiang Province, China. Construction started in 2007 with a total investment of 500 million yuan, and the airport was opened on 1 September 2009.

== History ==
On May 21, 2006, the State Council and the Central Military Commission of China officially approved the construction of Daqing Sartu Airport.

The construction of Sartu Airport began in October 2008. On August 3, 2009, all functional projects of the airport were completed. The total investment was 434.44 million yuan. On August 13, the airport completed its first test flight, and it officially opened to traffic on September 1. It had a 4C flight zone rating, a 2,600-meter-long runway.

In 2011, the first expansion and renovation project of Daqing Sartu Airport was completed. The project included adding two Class II remote aircraft stands, one dedicated de-icing apron, and one city terminal building. However, the bidding process for the expansion and renovation project was found to have involved illegal and irregular activities. The contract price was more than double the winning bid of 126 million yuan, raising questions about the nature of the bidding process and investment oversight.

In 2019, the "Daqing Sartu Airport Function Enhancement Project" commenced construction, which includes an 8,216.52 square meter international terminal, a connecting boarding bridge, and an immigration control building.

== Facilities ==
The airport has one runway that is 2,600 meters long and 45 meters wide, and a 14,000-square-meter terminal building. It is designed to handle 1.47 million passengers annually by 2020.

== Airlines and destinations ==
Airlines	Destinations
Air China	Beijing–Capital, Beijing–Daxing, Shanghai–Pudong
Chengdu Airlines	Harbin, Heihe
China Eastern Airlines	Qingdao, Shanghai–Hongqiao, Shanghai–Pudong, Yantai
China Southern Airlines	Beijing–Daxing, Changsha, Chengdu–Tianfu, Dalian, Guangzhou, Qingdao, Sanya, Shanghai–Pudong, Xi'an

== See also ==
- List of airports in China
- List of the busiest airports in China
