= Jixi Xingkaihu Airport =

Airport in Heilongjiang, China

Jixi Xingkaihu Airport 鸡西兴凯湖机场
- IATA: JXA; ICAO: ZYJX

Summary
- Airport type: Public
- Serves: Jixi, Heilongjiang, China
- Location: Jidong, Heilongjiang
- Opened: 16 October 2009; 16 years ago
- Coordinates: 45°17′59″N 131°10′46″E

Map
- Location of airport in Heilongjiang

Runways
Direction	Length		Surface
Direction	m	ft	Surface
12/30	2,300	7,546	Concrete

Statistics (2025)
- Passengers: 437,702
- Aircraft movements: 3,278
- Cargo (metric tons): 525.8

Jixi Xingkaihu Airport
- Simplified Chinese: 鸡西兴凯湖机场
- Traditional Chinese: 雞西興凱湖機場
Transcriptions
Standard Mandarin
- Hanyu Pinyin: Jīxi Xìngkǎihú Jīchǎng

Jixi Xingkaihu Airport (IATA: JXA, ICAO: ZYJX) is an airport serving Jixi, a city in Heilongjiang Province, China. It is located 18 kilometers from the city center in Jidong County near the Russian border, and is named after Khanka Lake (Xingkaihu in Chinese). The airport cost 262 million yuan to build and was opened in October 2009.

The Jixi Xingkaihu Airport replaces the old Jixi Pingyang Airport (鸡西平阳机场) that was built in the 1930s.

== History ==
Jixi Xingkaihu Airport started construction on October 15, 2007, was completed in 2009, and officially opened to the public on October 16, 2009.

On May 17, 2011, the Civil Aviation Administration of China approved the construction of the Jixi Airport Instrument Landing System (ILS) project, officially launching the project.

In 2013, the apron expansion project of Jixi Xingkaihu Airport was started, increasing the number of aircraft stands from 2 to 4. The project passed the completion acceptance test on July 21, 2015.

On August 25, 2017, the airport's ILS project passed industry acceptance and officially opened for operation on December 16.

The expansion and renovation project of Jixi Xingkaihu Airport was officially approved at the end of 2019. The goal was to upgrade it to a 4C-level civil regional airport after completion, meeting the full-load take-off and landing requirements of mainstream aircraft. The preliminary design of the project was jointly approved by the Civil Aviation Administration of Northeast China and the Provincial Department of Transportation on March 13, 2020. However, the project's design investment was reduced from 1.158 billion yuan to 710 million yuan.

On June 15, 2020, the expansion and renovation project of Jixi Xingkai Lake Airport officially commenced construction. The main works included extending the runway westward by 500 meters to 2800 meters, adding six new Category C parking stands and supporting facilities. On December 27, 2021, the Jixi Airport expansion and renovation project passed the final acceptance inspection.

== Airlines and destinations ==
Airlines	Destinations
Chengdu Airlines	Chengdu–Tianfu, Harbin, Jinan, Mohe
China Express Airlines	Dalian, Tianjin
China United Airlines	Beijing-Daxing
China Southern Airlines	Guangzhou, Shenyang
Hainan Airlines	Beijing–Capital
Loong Air	Hangzhou, Yantai
Shanghai Airlines	Qingdao, Shanghai–Hongqiao

== See also ==
- List of airports in China
- List of the busiest airports in China
