= Fuyuan Dongji Airport =

Airport in Heilongjiang, China

Fuyuan Dongji Airport 抚远东极机场
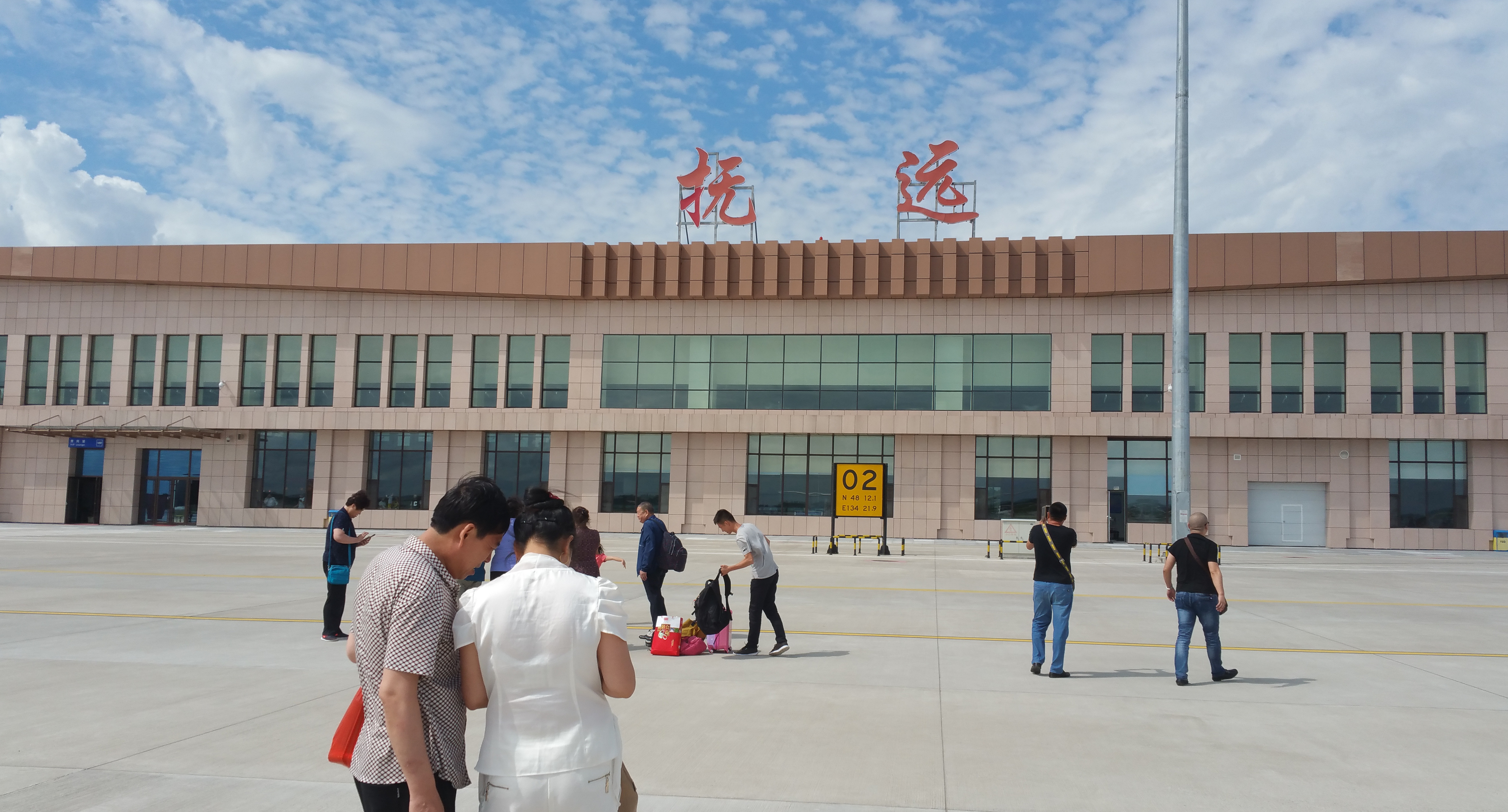
- IATA: FYJ; ICAO: ZYFY

Summary
- Airport type: Public
- Serves: Fuyuan, Heilongjiang
- Location: Nongqiao Town
- Opened: 26 May 2014; 12 years ago
- Coordinates: 48°11′58.18″N 134°21′59.21″E

Map
- Location of airport in Heilongjiang

Runways
Direction	Length		Surface
Direction	m	ft	Surface
05/23	2,500	8,202	Concrete

Statistics (2021)
- Passengers: 27,013
- Aircraft movements: 518
- Source:, GCM, STV

Fuyuan Dongji Airport
- Simplified Chinese: 抚远东极机场
- Traditional Chinese: 撫遠東極機場
Transcriptions
Standard Mandarin
- Hanyu Pinyin: Fǔyuǎn Dōngjí Jīchǎng

Fuyuan Dongji Airport (IATA: FYJ, ICAO: ZYFY) is an airport serving Fuyuan County, in China's Heilongjiang province. It is located in Nongqiao Town, 19 kilometres (12 mi) from the Fuyuan county seat, and about 65 kilometres (40 mi) from Khabarovsk, Russia. Construction began after the airport was approved by the national government in May 2012. The airport cost 500 million yuan to build, and was opened for operations on 26 May 2014, initially with a single scheduled flight to Harbin.

== Facilities ==
The airport has a runway that is 2,500 meters long and 45 meters wide (class 4C), a 4,000-square-meter terminal building, and four aircraft parking aprons. It is designed to handle 260,000 passengers and 1,430 tons of cargo per year by 2020.

== Airlines and destinations ==
Airlines	Destinations
Air China	Beijing–Capital, Harbin
Chengdu Airlines	Chengdu–Tianfu, Harbin, Jiamusi, Mohe

Destinations map
Destinations from Fuyuan Dongji Airport

== See also ==
- List of airports in China
- List of the busiest airports in China
