= Zhuhai Jinwan Airport =

Domestic airport serving Zhuhai, Guangdong, China

Zhuhai Jinwan Airport 珠海金湾机场
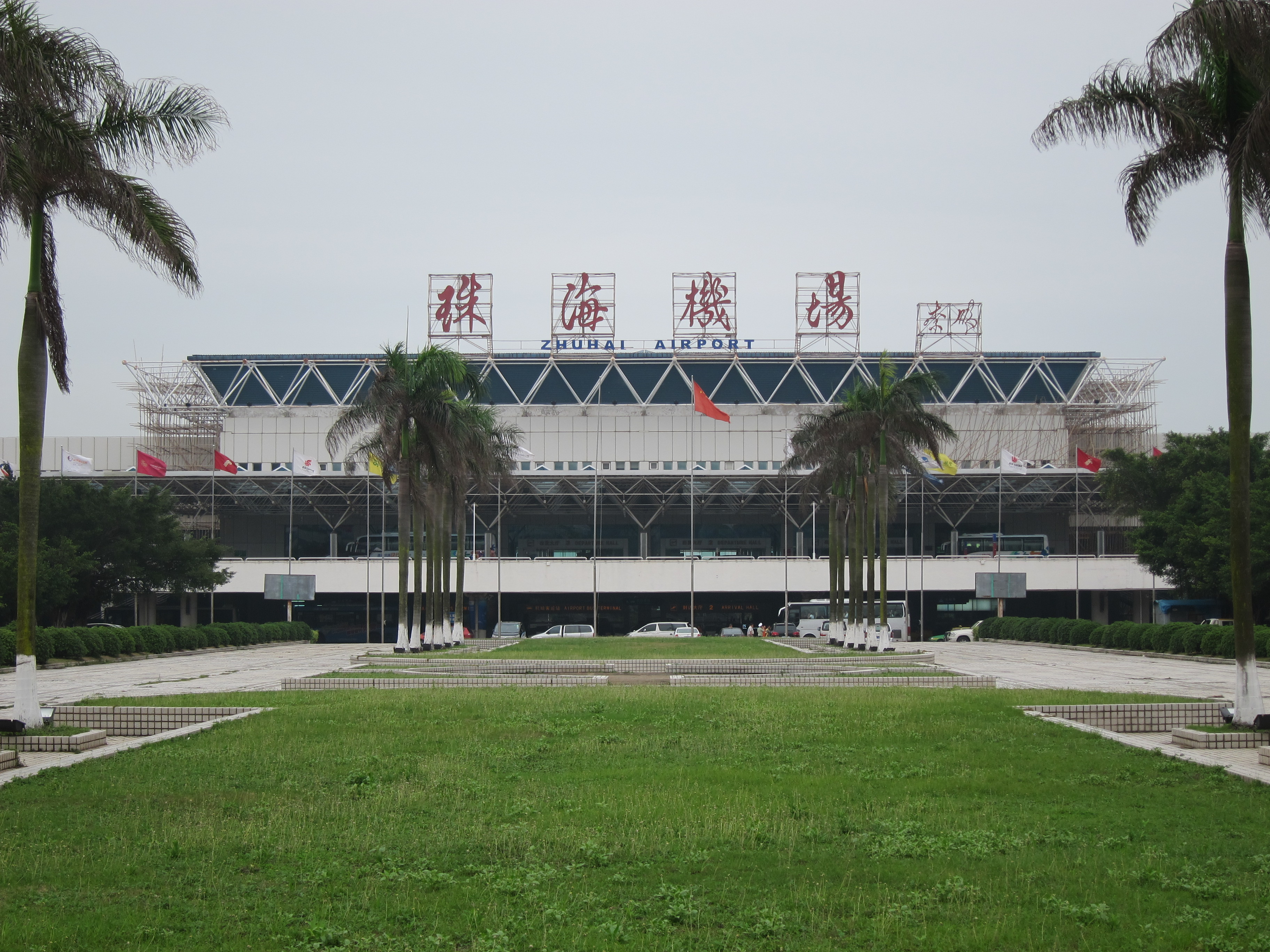
- IATA: ZUH; ICAO: ZGSD

Summary
- Airport type: Public / Military
- Owner/Operator: Hong Kong-Zhuhai Airport Management Co., Ltd.
- Location: Sanzao, Jinwan, Zhuhai, Guangdong, China
- Opened: June 1995; 31 years ago
- Focus city for: China Southern Airlines
- Elevation AMSL: 7 m (23 ft)
- Coordinates: 22°00′25″N 113°22′34″E
- Website: www.zhairport.com (in Chinese)

Map
- Location of airport in Guangdong

Runways
Direction	Length		Surface
Direction	m	ft	Surface
05/23	4,120	13,517	Asphalt concrete

Statistics (2025)
- Passengers: 13,252,642
- Aircraft movements: 92,419
- Cargo (metric tons): 39,553.8
- Source: List of the busiest airports in China,

Zhuhai Jinwan Airport
- Simplified Chinese: 珠海金湾机场
- Traditional Chinese: 珠海金灣機場
Transcriptions
Standard Mandarin
- Hanyu Pinyin: Zhūhǎi Jīnwān Jīchǎng
Yue: Cantonese
- Jyutping: zyu^{1}hoi^{2} gam^{1}waan^{1} gei^{1}coeng^{4}

Zhuhai Jinwan Airport (Chinese: 珠海金湾机场) (IATA: ZUH, ICAO: ZGSD), formerly known as Zhuhai Sanzao Airport (珠海三灶機場) and commonly referred to as Zhuhai Airport (珠海機場) before 2013, is one of the five major airports in the Pearl River Delta region. It is the primary airport serving the city of Zhuhai in China's Guangdong province. It is located some 50 kilometres (31 mi) southwest of the Zhuhai city center in Sanzao Town, Jinwan District, and 25 kilometres (16 mi) southwest of Macau.

The airport currently serves only Chinese domestic flights despite having facilities for international flights. The airport hosts the largest airshow in mainland China, the China International Aviation & Aerospace Exhibition.

== History ==
In the late 1930s, the site of today's Zhuhai Jinwan Airport was first developed into an airfield known as Sanzao Airport, constructed by Japanese forces in 1938 during the occupation of parts of South China, where it served as a military air base in the Second World War.

After Japan's defeat in 1945, the airfield fell into long-term disuse, functioning only intermittently for limited military or general aviation purposes. In 1948, the runway at Sanzao Airport was destroyed by the Chinese Nationalist government. By 1949, the abandoned airfield had fallen into disuse and was repurposed by local fishermen as a place for drying fish and grain.

On 18 December 1989, the State Council and the Central Military Commission approved Zhuhai's request to use the Air Force's Sanzao Air Base for civil aviation operations. At that time, the airport operated under a 'military–civil dual‑use' arrangement, meaning that the local government was permitted to conduct civil aviation activities on what remained an active military facility.

A major transformation began in 1992, when Zhuhai authorities decided to rebuild the abandoned Sanzao airfield into a modern civil aviation airport. This redevelopment culminated in the opening of the new facility— then named Zhuhai Sanzao Airport.

When large‑scale construction of Zhuhai Airport began in 1993, it was built to China's highest 4E‑class standard, with a planned runway length of 4,000 meters. At that time, no airport in the country had ever constructed a runway of this length.

At the time of its opening in 1995, the airport featured a 4,000‑metre runway and one of the most advanced sets of navigation and terminal facilities in China, with a terminal building (now Terminal 1) that ranked among the largest of its kind in the country.

One year later in 1996, the first China International Aviation & Aerospace Exhibition was hosted at the airport.

Between 1996 and 2006, Zhuhai Sanzao Airport entered a prolonged downturn, struggling to attract passengers due to the dense concentration of major airports in the Pearl River Delta (Guangzhou, Shenzhen, Hong Kong, and Macau), as well as inconvenient ground transportation links. As a result, traffic volumes fell far short of expectations, and the airport faced severe financial losses and mounting debt. There were numerous reports that the airport was going bankrupt due to funding and financial problems, which the authorities repeatedly denied.

In October 2006, the Zhuhai municipal government and the Airport Authority Hong Kong established the joint venture "Zhuhai–Hong Kong Airport Management Co., Ltd.," placing the airport under the management of the Hong Kong Airport Authority. This arrangement marked the first time a mainland Chinese airport had been operated under Hong Kong's management model.

After adopting the Hong Kong airport management model, Zhuhai Jinwan Airport has entered a period of rapid growth and expansion. In 2013, the airport was officially renamed "Zhuhai Jinwan Airport," marking a new phase in its development. Benefiting from Hong Kong Airport Authority's management experience and the surge in domestic air‑travel demand, passenger throughput rose steadily year after year.

In 2018, the airport handled more than 11.22 million passengers, placing it firmly among China's "ten‑million‑class" airports.

With the continued rise of the Zhuhai Airshow and deeper integration within the Greater Bay Area, the airport launched its Terminal 2 expansion project, and by 2024 it achieved a historic record of nearly 13 million passengers—its highest annual traffic to date.

== Military use ==
Zhuhai Jinwan airport is used by the China Coast Guard as a Coast Guard air station. It is also the headquarters of the China Coast Guard's 2nd Aviation Group.

== Future expansion ==
In September 2017, the CAAC and the government of Guangdong province announced an expansion plan of Zhuhai airport, including expansion of the eastern corridor, the third and fourth floor of the terminal and the western VIP lounge. The terminal will be expanded to an area of 122,000 m^{2} (1,310,000 sq ft). The plan started in November 2017 and was completed on February 9 2018.

A new terminal and a 2,600-metre (8,500 ft) runway is also planned. The new terminal started construction in November 2019 and is expected to be completed by June 2023.

== Airlines and destinations ==
=== Passengers ===
Airlines	Destinations
Air Chang'an	Libo, Xi'an
Air China	Beijing–Capital, Beijing–Daxing, Chengdu–Tianfu, Chongqing, Dazhou, Hangzhou, Tianjin, Wuhan
Air Guilin	Yancheng, Yinchuan
Chengdu Airlines	Chengdu–Tianfu
China Eastern Airlines	Beijing–Daxing, Changzhou, Harbin, Kunming, Nanchang, Nanjing, Ningbo, Qingdao, Shanghai–Hongqiao, Shanghai–Pudong, Shenyang, Xi'an
China Express Airlines	Quzhou, Xuzhou
China Southern Airlines	Beijing–Daxing, Changchun, Chengdu–Tianfu, Chongqing, Guiyang, Haikou, Hangzhou, Harbin, Hefei, Kunming, Luzhou, Nanjing, Sanya, Shanghai–Pudong, Shenyang, Taiyuan, Ürümqi, Wuhan, Xi'an, Yiwu, Zhengzhou
China United Airlines	Beijing–Daxing, Wenzhou
Chongqing Airlines	Chongqing
Colorful Guizhou Airlines	Tongren, Xingyi, Zunyi–Xinzhou
Donghai Airlines	Datong, Haikou, Hohhot, Jingzhou, Lanzhou, Nanjing, Nantong, Quanzhou, Taiyuan, Taizhou, Tianjin, Wuxi, Yichang, Zhengzhou
GX Airlines	Haikou, Lianyungang, Luoyang
Hainan Airlines	Dalian, Haikou, Hangzhou, Hefei, Taiyuan, Xi'an, Zhengzhou
Hebei Airlines	Beijing–Daxing
Juneyao Air	Nanjing, Shanghai–Hongqiao Shanghai–Pudong, Wuxi
LJ Air	Changzhi, Harbin, Hefei
Loong Air	Harbin, Ningbo, Shenyang, Wuhan, Xuzhou
Lucky Air	Chengdu–Tianfu, Kunming
Shandong Airlines	Beijing–Capital, Changchun, Chongqing, Dalian, Fuzhou, Hangzhou, Haikou, Harbin, Jinan, Nanchang, Nanjing, Ningbo, Qingdao, Shanghai–Hongqiao, Shenyang, Tianjin, Wenzhou, Wuhan, Wuyishan, Xi'an, Yangzhou, Zhengzhou
Shanghai Airlines	Shanghai–Hongqiao
Shenzhen Airlines	Hefei, Nanjing, Nantong, Shenyang, Wuxi, Xiangyang
Sichuan Airlines	Chengdu–Shuangliu, Chengdu–Tianfu, Chongqing, Xi'an
Spring Airlines	Ningbo, Shijiazhuang, Yangzhou
Suparna Airlines	Shanghai–Pudong Taiyuan
Tianjin Airlines	Ganzhou, Haikou, Nanchang, Xi'an, Yulin (Shaanxi)
West Air	Chongqing, Zhengzhou
XiamenAir	Fuzhou, Hangzhou, Quanzhou, Shanghai–Hongqiao, Xiamen

=== Cargo ===
Airlines	Destinations
China Southern Airlines Cargo	Shanghai–Pudong
JD Airlines	Cebu

== Transport ==
=== Airport Express Buses ===
There are four airport express bus routes connecting the airport and Zhuhai city centre, mainly serve major hotels and city lounges in Xiangzhou, Gongbei, Jida and Tangjiawan. Some routes connect stations of Guangzhou-Zhuhai intercity railway (including Zhuhai railway station), Jiuzhou Port (major ferry terminal with frequent passenger ships to Hong Kong) and Gongbei Port.

Other intercity lines connect hotels, city lounges or bus terminals of Macau, Zhongshan and Jiangmen with the airport.

=== Public transport ===
The airport is also served by the Zhuhai city bus network through routes 207 (to the Gongbei Port of Entry and Zhuhai Railway Station), 504 (to Jing'an in the Doumen District) and 701 (to Sanzao town proper).

The airport has its exclusive taxi company to transport the arrivals to everywhere.

The airport has its Zhuhai Airport Station linked with the Zhuhai–Zhuhai Airport intercity railway. It started operation on 3 February 2024.

== Statistics ==
Traffic by calendar year
	Passengers	Change from previous year	Cargo (tons)	Change from previous year	Aircraft operations	Change from previous year
2005	657,117	N/A	7,980.8	N/A	22,742	N/A
2006	799,125	▲21.6%	8,872.7	▲11.2%	24,352	▲7.1%
2007	1,041,080	▲30.3%	10,750.1	▲21.2%	25,405	▲4.3%
2008	1,121,831	▲7.8%	11,139.3	▲3.7%	30,430	▲19.8%
2009	1,385,858	▲23.5%	13,759.6	▲23.5%	23,149	▼23.9%
2010	1,819,051	▲31.3%	17,578.8	▲27.8%	37,651	▲62.6%
2011	1,797,306	▼1.2%	16,768.3	▼4.6%	48,059	▲27.6%
2012	2,090,491	▲16.3%	16,270.4	▼3.0%	43,815	▼8.8%
2013	2,894,357	▲38.5%	22,667.1	▲39.3%	44,725	▲2.1%
2014	4,075,918	▲40.8%	22,128.2	▼2.4%	50,939	▲13.9%
2015	4,708,706	▲15.5%	25,828.1	▲16.7%	50,478	▼0.9%
2016	6,130,384	▲30.2%	31,511.6	▲22.0%	61,400	▲21.6%
2017	9,216,808	▲50.3%	37,379.0	▲18.6%	74,694	▲21.7%
2018	11,220,703	▲21.7%	46,393.0	▲24.1%	85,380	▲14.3%
2019	12,282,982	▲9.5%	50,989.4	▲9.9%	88,989	▲4.2%
2020	7,335,646	▼40.3%	38,357.8	▼24.8%	66,450	▼25.3%
2021	8,020,230	▲9.3%	40,046.8	▲4.4%	69,073	▲3.9%
2022	4,005,732	▼50.1%	28,462.2	▼28.9%	39,487	▼42.8%

== See also ==
- List of airports in China
- List of the busiest airports in China
