= Xinzhou Wutaishan Airport =

Airport in Shanxi, China

Xinzhou Wutaishan Airport 忻州五台山机场
- IATA: WUT; ICAO: ZBXZ

Summary
- Airport type: Public / military
- Serves: Xinzhou, Shanxi, China
- Location: Dingxiang
- Opened: 26 December 2015; 10 years ago
- Coordinates: 38°35′57″N 112°58′04″E

Map
- Location of airport in Shanxi

Runways
| Direction | Length | | Surface |
| Direction | m | ft | Surface |
|---|---|---|---|
| 08/26 | 2,600 | 8,530 | Concrete |

Statistics (2025)
- Passengers: 518,692
- Aircraft movements: 4,714
- Cargo (metric tons): 129.39

Xinzhou Wutaishan Airport
- Simplified Chinese: 忻州五台山机场
- Traditional Chinese: 忻州五台山機場
Transcriptions
Standard Mandarin
- Hanyu Pinyin: Xīnzhōu Wǔtáishān Jīchǎng

Xinzhou Wutaishan Airport (IATA: WUT, ICAO: ZBXZ), formerly Dingxiang Airport, is a civilian and military dual-use airport located 71 kilometers from the core scenic area of Wutaishan Mountain. Situated in Wuweizhuang Village, Hongdao Town, Dingxiang County, Shanxi Province, China, it was expanded from a military airport into a joint military-civilian feeder airport. It serves the city of Xinzhou and Wutaishan, a Buddhist sacred mountain and World Heritage Site. The airport is located 33 kilometers from Xinzhou. Construction started in June 2010 with a total investment of 476 million yuan, and the airport was opened on 26 December 2015.

== History ==
In 2001, the Xinzhou Wutaishan Airport site selection was completed. Construction officially began in June 2013, the total approved investment budget of the project was 637.92 million yuan.

The airport passed final acceptance on September 23, 2015. On October 22, an Airbus A320 aircraft operated by China Southern Airlines completed its test flight. Xinzhou Wutaishan Airport officially opened to traffic on December 25, 2015.

On 2 July 2019, the aviation port at Wutaishan Airport was officially opened on a temporary basis, and its first international route was the Bangkok service operated by China Eastern Airlines.

In April 2025, the airport was temporarily closed for 30 days for runway repairs and maintenance, and all routes and flights were suspended.

== Facilities ==
The airport has one runway that is 2,600 meters long and 45 meters wide, and a 4,000-square-meter terminal building. It was projected to handle 350,000 passengers annually by 2020.

== Airlines and destinations ==
| Airlines | Destinations |
|---|---|
| 9 Air | Guangzhou, Harbin |
| Air Guilin | Guilin, Haikou, Harbin, Shenyang |
| Ruili Airlines | Chengdu–Tianfu, Kunming, Shenyang |
| Shanghai Airlines | Shanghai–Pudong |

== See also ==
- List of airports in China
- List of the busiest airports in China
- List of People's Liberation Army Air Force airbases
