= Heihe Aihui Airport =

Airport in Heilongjiang, China

Heihe Aihui Airport 黑河瑷珲机场
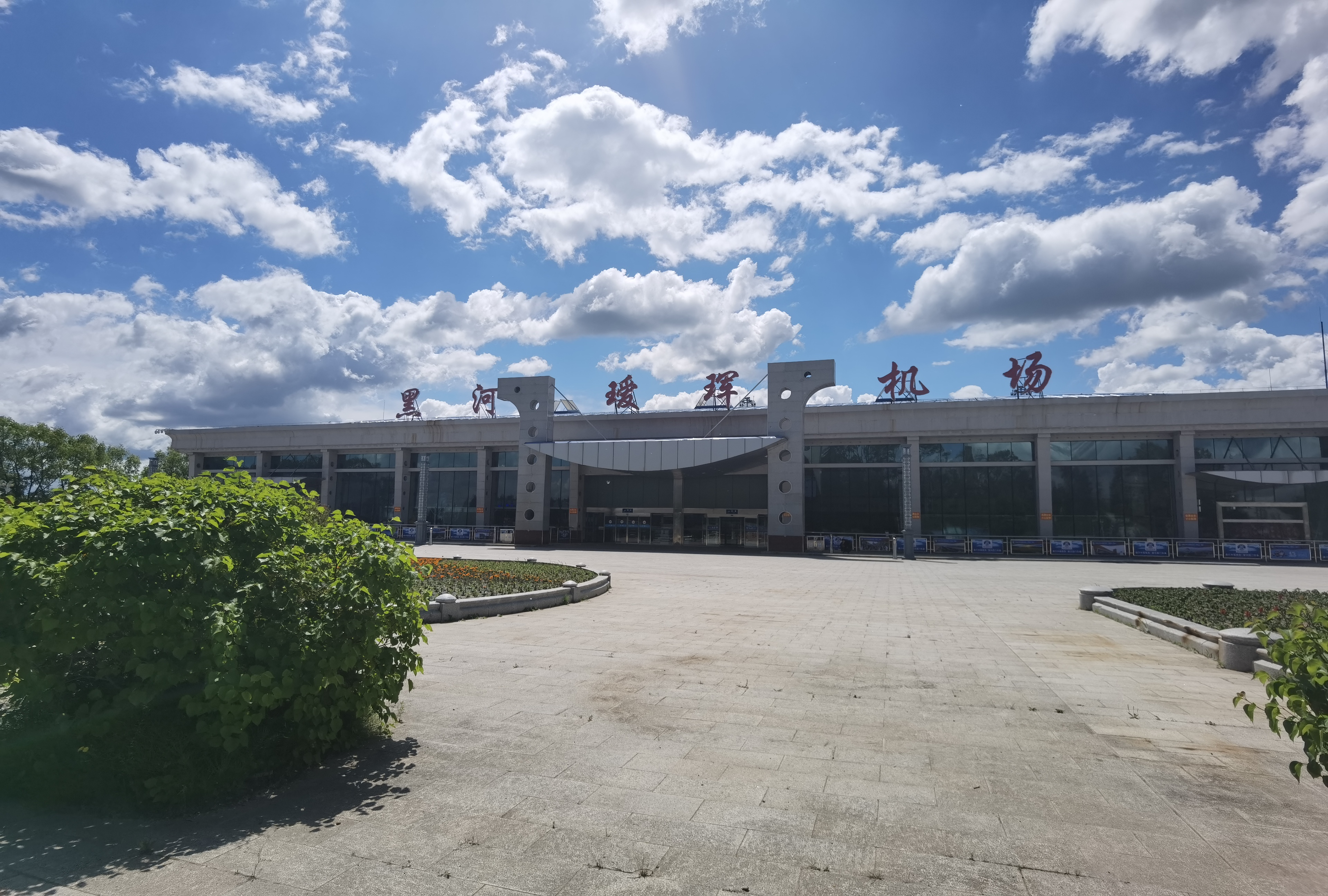
- IATA: HEK; ICAO: ZYHE

Summary
- Airport type: Public
- Serves: Heihe, Heilongjiang, China
- Elevation AMSL: 312 m (1,024 ft)
- Coordinates: 50°10′20″N 127°18′31″E

Map
- Location of airport in Heilongjiang

Runways
Direction	Length		Surface
Direction	m	ft	Surface
17/35	2,500	8,202	Asphalt

Statistics (2025)
- Passengers: 345,078
- Aircraft movements: 5,154
- Cargo (metric tons): 140.5

Heihe Aihui Airport
- Simplified Chinese: 黑河瑷珲机场
- Traditional Chinese: 黑河璦琿機場
Transcriptions
Standard Mandarin
- Hanyu Pinyin: Hēihé Àihuī Jīchǎng

Heihe Aihui Airport (IATA: HEK, ICAO: ZYHE) is an airport serving the city of Heihe in Heilongjiang Province, China. It is not far away from Ignatyevo Airport in Blagoveshchensk, Russia.

== History ==
Heihe Aihui Airport, originally named Heihe Airport, opened in 1933. Initially used for both military and civilian purposes, it operated regular routes to Harbin, Qiqihar, and Mohe.

In 1958, Heihe Airport was officially converted into a purely civilian airport and put into operation. In the same year, regular flights between Heihe and Harbin were launched, making it an important hub for strengthening transportation and economic ties in northern Heilongjiang Province. Due to the deterioration of Sino-Soviet relations, the airport was closed in 1969 and was not rebuilt until the 1980s.

In 1983, in order to adapt to the needs of reform and opening up, the state decided to rebuild Heihe Airport, and Heihe Airport was re-established in October 1984. In November 1985, the airport resumed operations, at which time the airport had an unpaved runway. The Harbin-Heihe route resumed operation using Antonov An-24.

In 1987, Heihe took the lead in resuming trade along the Sino-Soviet border. In 1987, the second phase of the expansion project of Heihe Airport was launched, which included the construction of a 1,500-meter-long and 30-meter-wide cement runway, marking a significant upgrade in the airport's hardware facilities.

To meet the needs of tourism and trade activities between China and Russia, Heihe Airport launched the Heihe-Blagoveshchensk charter flight route in 1994, which is known as the "world's shortest international route," with the flight taking only 9 minutes from takeoff to landing.

In 1996, Heihe Airport was closed for expansion. The actual expansion work began on May 7, 2000. The total investment for the project was 198.53 million yuan. The flight area construction was completed on September 30, 2001. The expansion project was completed on October 1, 2003. The newly expanded airport is a 4C-class airport with a runway 2,500 meters long and 45 meters wide, capable of handling medium-sized aircraft such as the B-737 and MD82.

In March 2016, Heihe Airport was officially renamed Heihe Aihui Airport.

== Airlines and destinations ==
Airlines	Destinations
Chengdu Airlines	Daqing, Harbin, Mohe, Wudalianchi, Yichun (Heilongjiang)
China Eastern Airlines	Harbin, Shanghai–Pudong
China Southern Airlines	Beijing–Daxing, Harbin
