= Jiamusi Songjiang International Airport =

Airport serving Jiamusi, Heilongjiang, China

Jiamusi Songjiang International Airport 佳木斯松江国际机场
- IATA: JMU; ICAO: ZYJM

Summary
- Airport type: Public
- Serves: Jiamusi
- Location: Dongfeng, Jiamusi, Heilongjiang, China
- Opened: January 2000; 26 years ago
- Built: October 1932; 94 years ago
- Elevation AMSL: 80 m (260 ft)
- Coordinates: 46°50′36″N 130°27′55″E

Maps
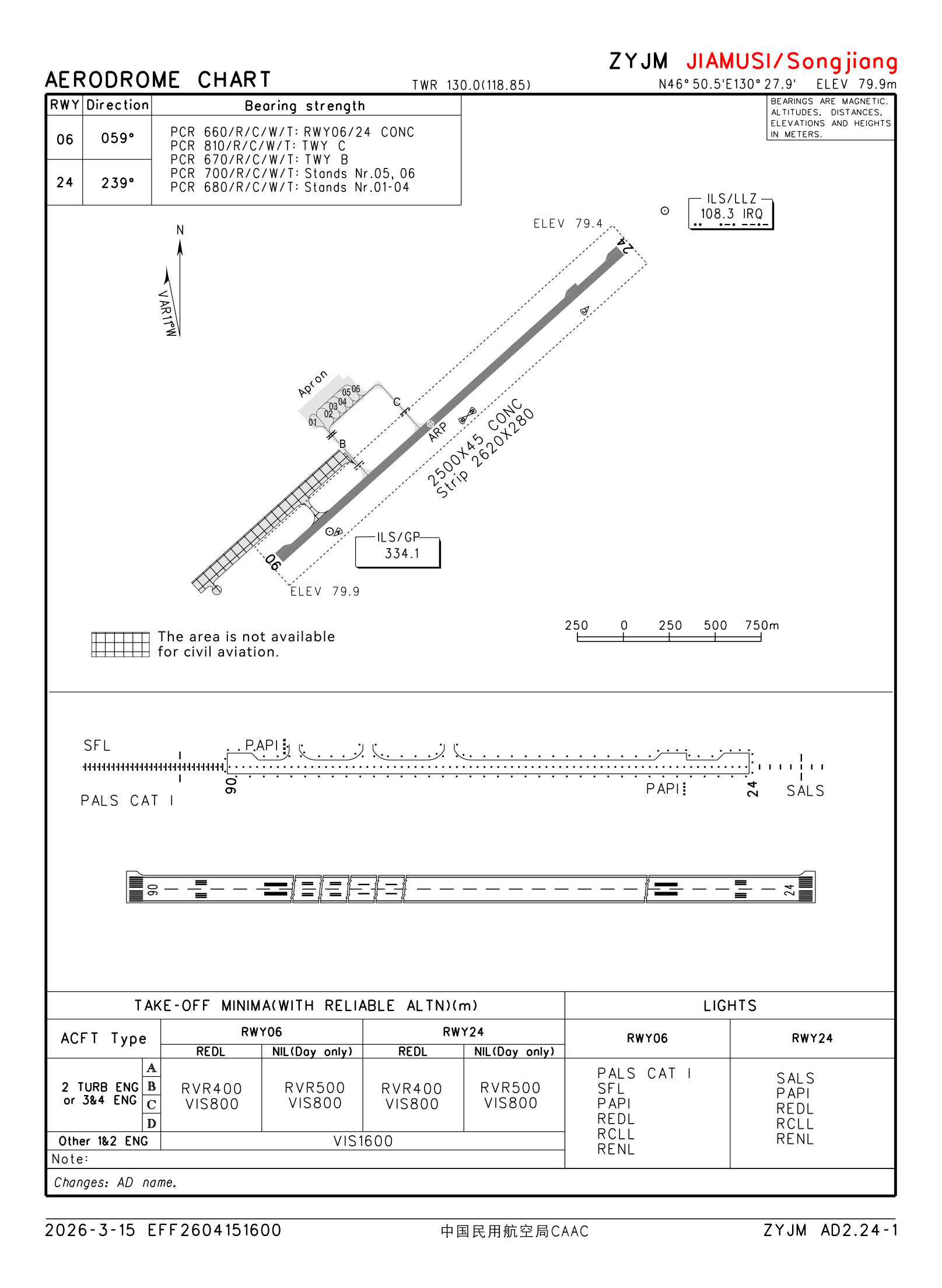
- CAAC airport chart

- Location in Heilongjiang JMU/ZYJM (China)

Runways
Direction	Length		Surface
Direction	m	ft	Surface
06/24	2,500	8,202	Concrete

Statistics (2025)
- Passengers: 875,834
- Aircraft movements: 6,560
- Cargo (metric tons): 1,464.8
- Source: CAAC 2023 data

Jiamusi Songjiang International Airport
- Simplified Chinese: 佳木斯松江国际机场
- Traditional Chinese: 佳木斯松江國際機場
Transcriptions
Standard Mandarin
- Hanyu Pinyin: Jiāmùsī Sōngjiāng Guójì Jīchǎng

Jiamusi Songjiang International Airport (IATA: JMU, ICAO: ZYJM) is an airport serving Jiamusi in Heilongjiang province, China. The airport is located 10 kilometers east of the city center.

== History ==
The history of Jiamusi Songjiang International Airport can be traced back to Jiamusi East Suburb Airport, Jiamusi Airport and Dongmonguli Airport, which was built in October 1932.

In 1958, the Jiamusi Station of the Civil Aviation Administration of China was established and the government decided to convert the airport into a joint-use airport, hosting both civil aviation and military operations. To meet the needs of civil aviation passenger and cargo transport, a reconstruction of the original site and rudimentary facilities was necessary. In November 1958, the airport was rebuilt on its original site of Dongmonguli Airport. This reconstruction aimed to improve the airport's transport capacity and air traffic conditions. It was completed and put into use in January 1959, and civil aviation services were officially opened in the same year. The airport was renamed as Jiamusi Airport.

In 1998, the renovation and expansion of the airport started and the airport was re-opened to the public in January 2000. The renovation and expansion project covered an area of 260 hectares, with a runway extended to 2,200 meters long and 45 meters wide, an apron area of 33,000 square meters, a terminal building of 5,728 square meters, a cargo warehouse of 584 square meters, and a designed annual passenger throughput of 300,000. The airport reached the 4C standard.

On October 19, 2012, the runway extension project at Jiamusi Airport was completed and officially put into use. This extension project increased the total length of the airport runway from the original 2,200 meters to 2,500 meters. After the runway extension, the airport can meet the full-weight take-off and landing requirements of mainstream aircraft such as the Boeing 737-800.

In December 2025, the airport has been renamed from Jiamusi Dongjiao Airport to Jiamusi Songjiang International Airport.

== Facilities ==
Jiamusi Songjiang International Airport covers 260 hectares of land and has one runway.

- 06/24: 2200 by 40 meters, Concrete.

== Airlines and destinations ==
Airlines	Destinations
Air China	Beijing–Capital, Beijing–Daxing, Shanghai–Pudong
Chengdu Airlines	Fuyuan, Harbin, Khabarovsk
China Eastern Airlines	Hangzhou, Jinan, Qingdao, Shanghai–Pudong, Yantai
China Express Airlines	Khabarovsk
China Southern Airlines	Dalian, Guangzhou, Shenzhen
Hainan Airlines	Beijing–Capital
Qingdao Airlines	Qingdao
Shandong Airlines	Nanjing

Destinations map
Destinations from Jiamusi Dongjiao Airport

== See also ==
- List of airports in China
- List of the busiest airports in China
