= Mohe Gulian Airport =

Airport in Heilongjiang, China

Mohe Gulian Airport 漠河古莲机场
- IATA: OHE; ICAO: ZYMH

Summary
- Airport type: Public
- Serves: Mohe, Heilongjiang, China
- Opened: June 2008; 18 years ago
- Elevation AMSL: 1,900 ft (580 m)
- Coordinates: 52°55′16″N 122°25′14″E

Map
- Location of airport in Heilongjiang

Runways
Direction	Length		Surface
Direction	m	ft	Surface
15/33	2,800	9,186	Concrete

Statistics (2021)
- Passengers: 14,458
- Aircraft movements: 298
- Cargo (metric tons): 3.6

Mohe Gulian Airport
- Simplified Chinese: 漠河古莲机场
- Traditional Chinese: 漠河古蓮機場
Transcriptions
Standard Mandarin
- Hanyu Pinyin: Mòhé Gǔlián Jīchǎng

Mohe Gulian Airport (IATA: OHE, ICAO: ZYMH) is an airport serving Mohe County in Heilongjiang Province, China. It is the northernmost airport in China and the first Chinese airport built on permafrost. Construction started in June 2006 with a total investment of 236 million yuan, and the airport was opened in June 2008. The airport closed in July 2021 for expansion and renovation of the airport. Service resumed on 27 January 2023.

== Facilities ==
The airport has one runway that is 2,800 meters long and 45 meters wide, and a 2,000-square-meter terminal building. It is designed to handle 470,000 passengers annually.

== Airlines and destinations ==
Airlines	Destinations
Chengdu Airlines	Fuyuan, Harbin, Heihe, Jiagedaqi, Jixi, Wudalianchi
China Southern Airlines	Beijing–Daxing, Harbin
Spring Airlines	Harbin, Shanghai–Pudong

== See also ==
- List of airports in China
- List of the busiest airports in China
