= Yantai Penglai International Airport =

Airport serving Yantai, Shandong, China

Yantai Penglai International Airport 烟台蓬莱国际机场
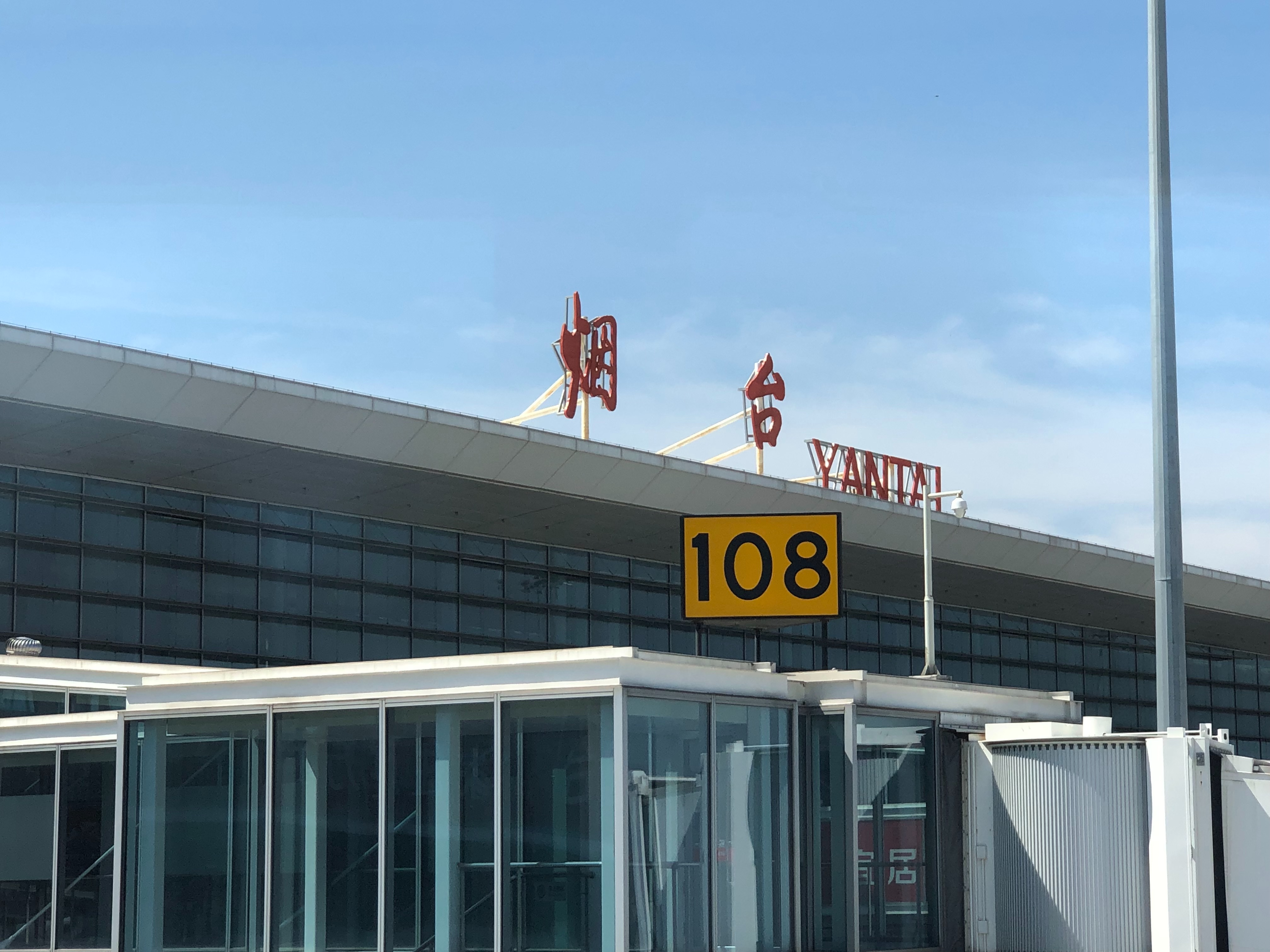
- IATA: YNT; ICAO: ZSYT

Summary
- Airport type: Public
- Operator: Yantai International Airport Group
- Serves: Yantai
- Location: Chaoshui, Penglai, Yantai, Shandong, China
- Opened: 28 May 2015; 11 years ago
- Focus city for: China Eastern Airlines; Shandong Airlines
- Time zone: CST (UTC+08:00)
- Elevation AMSL: 47 m (154 ft)
- Coordinates: 37°39′26″N 120°59′14″E
- Website: www.ytairport.com.cn

Maps
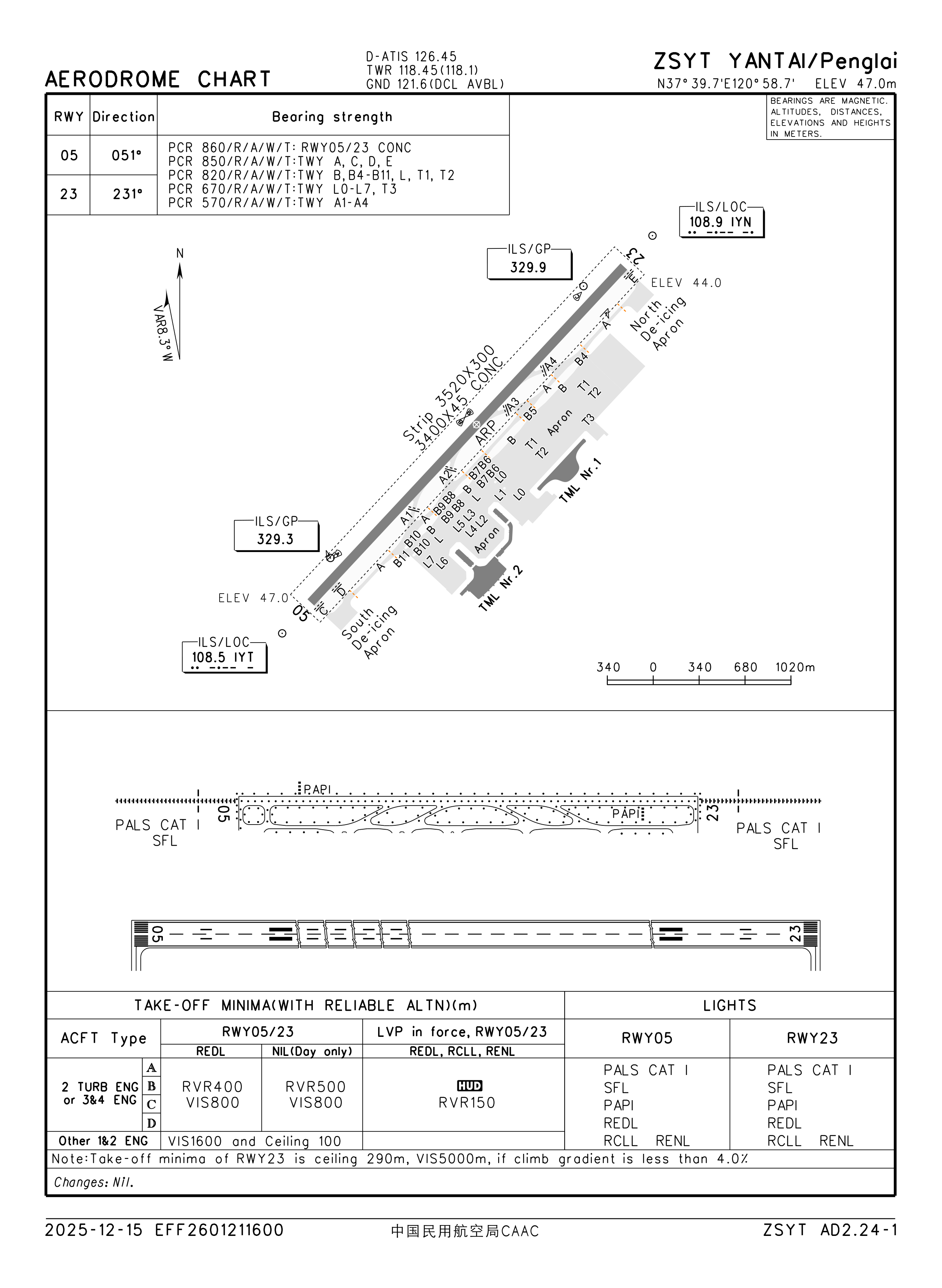
- CAAC airport chart

- Location in Shandong Location in China

Runways
Direction	Length		Surface
Direction	m	ft	Surface
05/23	3,400	11,155	Concrete

Statistics (2025)
- Passengers: 8,036,554
- Cargo (in tons): 72,622.4
- Aircraft movements: 68,553
- Source: List of the busiest airports in the People's Republic of China

Yantai Penglai International Airport
- Simplified Chinese: 烟台蓬莱国际机场
- Traditional Chinese: 煙台蓬萊國際機場
Transcriptions
Standard Mandarin
- Hanyu Pinyin: Yāntái Pénglái Guójì Jīchǎng
- Wade–Giles: Yen^{1}-tʻai^{2} Pʻêng^{2}-lai^{2} Kuo^{2}-chi^{4} Chi^{1}-chʻang^{3}

Yantai Penglai International Airport (IATA: YNT, ICAO: ZSYT) is an international airport serving the city of Yantai in East China's Shandong province. It is located 43 kilometres (27 mi) from the city center, near the Chaoshui town in Penglai District, a district in Yantai city. The airport is rated 3-star domestic airport for facilities, comfort, cleanliness, shopping, foods and staff service by Skytrax.

Construction officially started on 26 December 2009, and the airport was opened on 28 May 2015, when all flights serving Yantai were transferred from the old Laishan Airport. The first flight, China Eastern Airlines MU5136, landed at the airport from Beijing at 00:05 on 28 May. Originally called Yantai Chaoshui International Airport (Chinese: 烟台潮水国际机场), the airport adopted the current name in April 2014.

== Facilities ==
The airport has a runway that is 3,400 meters long and 45 meters wide (class 4D), and an 80,000-square-meter terminal building. It is projected to serve 12 million passengers and 90,000 tons of cargo annually by 2020. However, in 2025, the actual number of passenger movements was only 8,036,554 while the actual cargo movements were 72,622.4 tons, way below the projected numbers.

== Airlines and destinations ==
Airlines	Destinations
Air China	Beijing–Capital, Beijing–Daxing, Chengdu–Tianfu, Hangzhou
Air Travel	Chengdu–Tianfu, Kunming
China Eastern Airlines	Chengdu–Tianfu, Daqing, Hangzhou, Harbin, Hefei, Jiamusi, Kunming, Nanchang, Nantong, Seoul–Incheon, Shanghai–Hongqiao, Shanghai–Pudong, Taiyuan, Wuhan, Xiamen, Xi'an, Yanji, Zhengzhou, Zhoushan
China Southern Airlines	Guangzhou, Seoul–Incheon, Urumqi
Eastar Jet	Seoul–Incheon
Jin Air	Seoul-Incheon
Loong Air	Hangzhou, Jixi, Tonghua
Okay Airways	Changsha, Chongqing, Harbin
Qingdao Airlines	Changchun, Chongqing, Fuzhou, Haikou
Ruili Airlines	Kunming
Shandong Airlines	Beijing–Capital, Changchun, Chongqing, Guangzhou, Guilin, Nanjing, Shanghai–Hongqiao, Shenyang, Wuhan, Xi'an
Shanghai Airlines	Shanghai–Hongqiao, Shanghai–Pudong
Shenzhen Airlines	Chengdu–Tianfu, Guangzhou, Harbin, Shenyang, Shenzhen, Wuxi, Xi'an
Sichuan Airlines	Chengdu–Tianfu, Harbin
Thai VietJet Air	Bangkok–Suvarnabhumi
Tianjin Airlines	Dandong, Dalian, Heze, Ningbo, Tianjin, Urumqi, Xi'an
Yakutia Airlines	Seasonal charter: Khabarovsk, Vladivostok

=== Cargo ===
Airlines	Destinations
AirZeta	Seoul–Incheon
Central Airlines	Osaka–Kansai, Seoul–Incheon, Tokyo–Narita
China Cargo Airlines	Liege
China Postal Airlines	Seoul–Incheon
Jeju Air Cargo	Seoul–Incheon
Longhao Airlines	Osaka–Kansai, Seoul–Incheon
SF Airlines	Almaty, Karagandy, Liège
YTO Cargo Airlines	Seoul–Incheon, Tokyo–Narita

== See also ==
- List of all airports of 9 Air
- List of the busiest airports in China
