= Guilin Liangjiang International Airport =

Commercial airport serving Guilin, Guangxi, China

Guilin Liangjiang International Airport 桂林两江国际机场
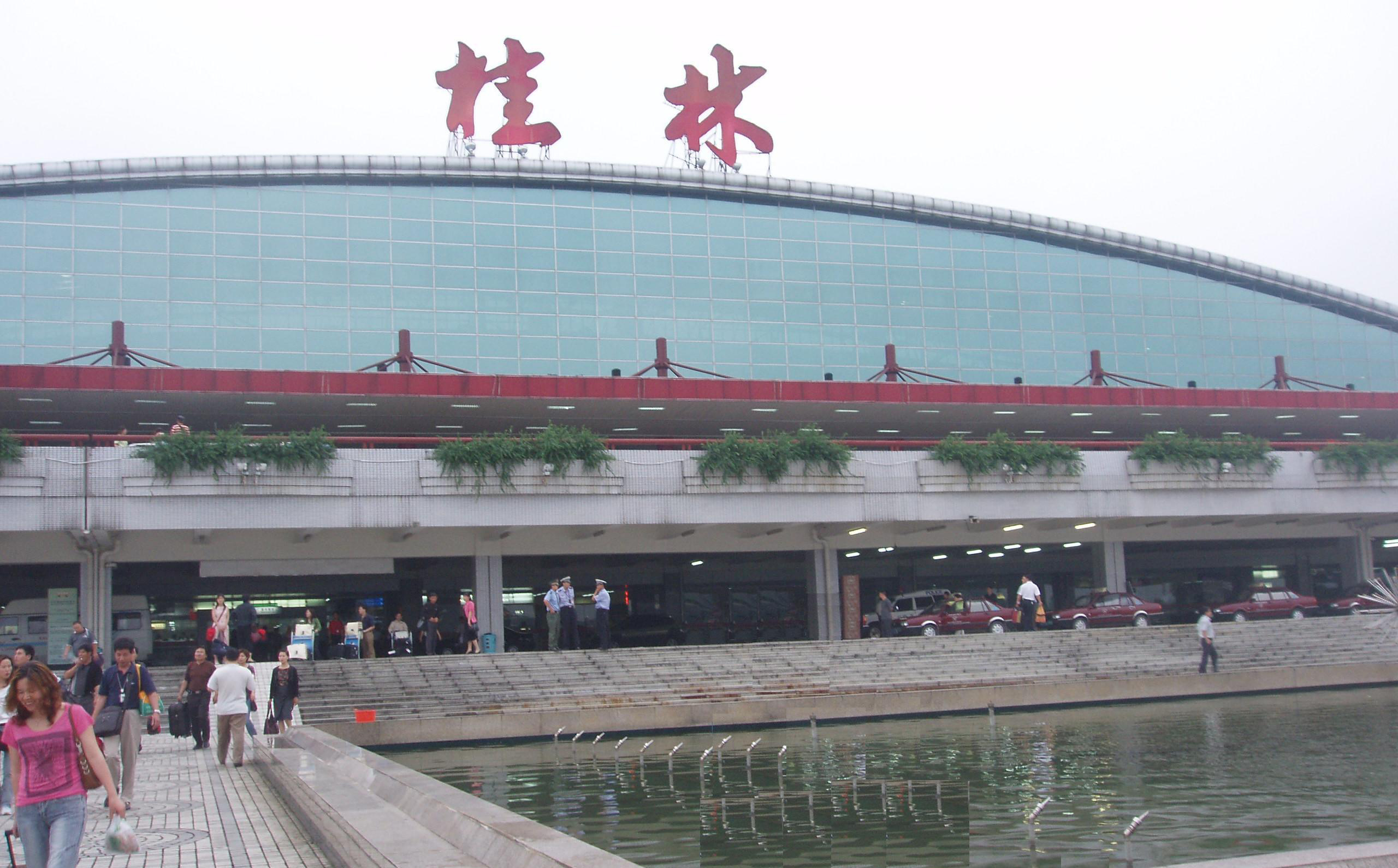
- IATA: KWL; ICAO: ZGKL

Summary
- Airport type: Public
- Serves: Guilin
- Location: Liangjiang Town, Lingui District, Guilin, Guangxi, China
- Opened: 1 October 1996; 30 years ago
- Hub for: Air Guilin
- Elevation AMSL: 174 m (571 ft)
- Coordinates: 25°13′10″N 110°02′22″E

Maps
- CAAC airport chart
- Location in Guangxi KWL/ZGKL (China)

Runways
Direction	Length		Surface
Direction	m	ft	Surface
01/19	3,200	10,499	Concrete

Statistics (2025)
- Passengers: 6,504,366
- Aircraft movements: 47,573
- Cargo (in tons): 14,376.9
- Source: List of the busiest airports in China

Guilin Liangjiang International Airport
- Simplified Chinese: 桂林两江国际机场
- Traditional Chinese: 桂林兩江國際機場
Transcriptions
Standard Mandarin
- Hanyu Pinyin: Guìlín Liǎngjiāng Guójì Jīchǎng

Guilin Liangjiang International Airport (IATA: KWL, ICAO: ZGKL) is an international airport serving the city of Guilin in South Central China's Guangxi Zhuang Autonomous Region. It is located in Liangjiang Town, about 28 km (17 mi) southwest of the city center.

In 2024, Guilin Liangjiang International Airport was the 49th busiest airport in China with 5,932,075 passengers. Around 4 million passengers transit through Liangjiang Airport annually, traveling to one of the 48 domestic and international destinations served nonstop from Guilin. In 2025, the airport became the 48th busiest airport in China (up one place), with a passenger throughput of 6,504,366.

== History ==
In September 1991, the State Council of China and the Central Military Commission approved a 1.85 billion yuan project to build a new airport to replace Guilin Qifengling Airport as Guilin's civil airport. Construction began in July 1993, and Liangjiang Airport was opened on 1 October 1996.

Liangjiang Airport now features a 3,200 meter-long runway, a 150,000 square meter large parking apron, 20 gate positions, and a 50,000 square meter large terminal building. The airport has also invested 20 million yuan into improving Liangjiang International's aesthetics and making the airport more environmentally-friendly. The airport has received several awards for their efforts.

Starting from 30 September 2018, all flights from Terminal 1 have been moved to Terminal 2. Terminal 2 has a floor area of 100,000 square meters, 22 security lanes which 17 for domestic and 5 for International and 25 boarding gate, the designed capacity to handle 12 million passengers and 95,000 tons of cargo a year. The construction of Terminal 2 started in December 2015 and it was opened on 30 September 2018, at a total cost of 3.258 billion yuan. Following the opening of the new Terminal 2, Terminal 1 was closed temporarily for renovation. A new apron and taxi lanes have been built and opened along with the new terminal.

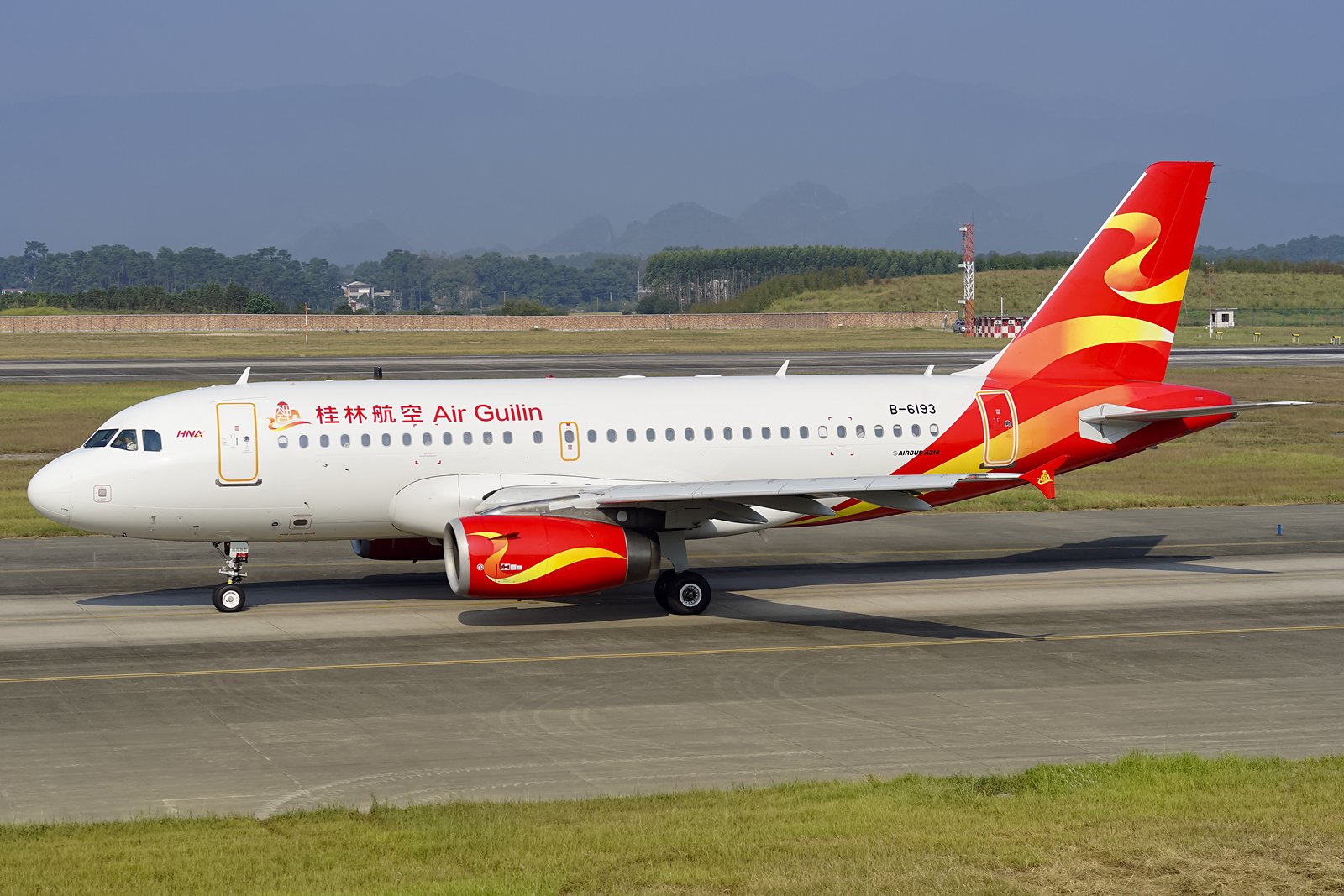
An Air Guilin Airbus A319 registered B-6193 taxiing at Liangjiang

== Airlines and destinations ==
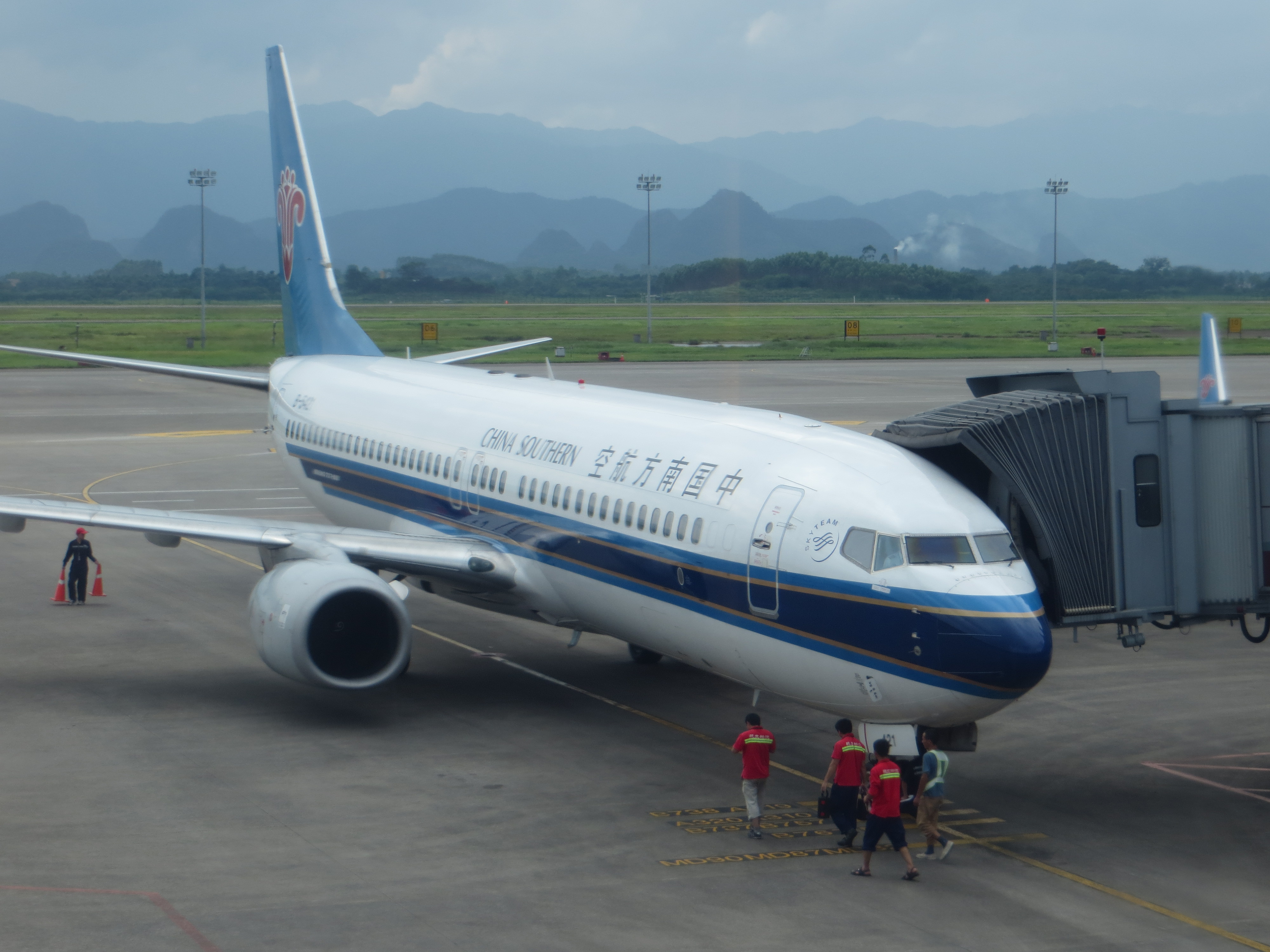
A China Southern Airlines Boeing 737-800 at the airport

Airlines	Destinations
Air Chang'an	Xi'an
Air China	Beijing–Capital, Beijing–Daxing, Chengdu–Tianfu, Tianjin
Air Guilin	Chengdu–Tianfu, Chongqing, Dalian, Haikou, Hangzhou, Harbin, Hohhot, Jinan, Jingzhou, Qingdao, Sanya, Shenyang, Shiyan, Tangshan, Wuhu, Xi'an, Xinzhou, Xuzhou, Yancheng, Yinchuan
AirAsia	Kuala Lumpur–International
Batik Air Malaysia	Charter: Kuala Lumpur–International
Beijing Capital Airlines	Haikou, Hangzhou, Linyi, Xi'an
China Eastern Airlines	Hefei, Jieyang, Lanzhou, Nanchang, Nanjing, Ningbo, Shanghai–Pudong, Taiyuan, Wenzhou Xi'an
China Southern Airlines	Beijing–Daxing, Zhengzhou
GX Airlines	Hanoi, Jinan
Hebei Airlines	Beijing–Daxing
Jeju Air	Seasonal: Seoul–Incheon
Jin Air	Seoul–Incheon
Juneyao Air	Nanjing, Shanghai–Pudong, Wuxi
Okay Airways	Nanjing, Tianjin
Shandong Airlines	Haikou, Hangzhou, Hefei, Jinan, Nanjing, Qingdao, Xiamen, Yantai, Zhengzhou
Shanghai Airlines	Changchun, Huai'an, Shanghai–Pudong
Sichuan Airlines	Sanya, Yinchuan
Spring Airlines	Lanzhou, Ningbo, Shanghai–Pudong, Shenyang, Shijiazhuang, Yangzhou
Suparna Airlines	Shanghai–Pudong
Tianjin Airlines	Xi'an
XiamenAir	Fuzhou, Hangzhou
