= Daxing'anling Oroqen Airport =

Airport in Heilongjiang, China

Daxing'anling Oroqen Airport 大兴安岭鄂伦春机场
- IATA: JGD; ICAO: ZYJD

Summary
- Airport type: Public / Forestry
- Location: Jiagedaqi, Heilongjiang, China
- Opened: 19 June 2012; 14 years ago
- Coordinates: 50°22′17″N 124°07′03″E

Map
- Location of airport in Heilongjiang

Runways
Direction	Length		Surface
Direction	m	ft	Surface
18/36	2,300	7,546	Concrete

Statistics (2021)
- Passengers: 175,561
- Aircraft movements: 2,451
- Cargo (metric tons): 26.0

Daxing'anling Oroqen Airport
- Simplified Chinese: 大兴安岭鄂伦春机场
- Traditional Chinese: 大興安嶺鄂倫春機場
Transcriptions
Standard Mandarin
- Hanyu Pinyin: Dàxīng'ānlǐng Èlúnchūn Jīchǎng

Daxing'anling Elunchun Airport (IATA: JGD, ICAO: ZYJD) is a civil and forestry airport serving Jiagedaqi District, Heilongjiang Province, China. It was first built in 1970 for fighting forest fires in the nearby Greater Khingan Mountains. Construction to expand the airport was started in September 2009 and completed by the end of 2011, with a total investment of 368 million yuan. The airport was opened to commercial flights on June 19, 2012. It will continue to be used mainly for the forestry industry, with limited commercial flights. After the expansion the airport's runway has been lengthened to 2,300 meters. The airport was formerly known as Jiagedaqi Airport (加格达奇机场) until February 2021.

== Airlines and destinations ==
Airlines	Destinations
Chengdu Airlines	Harbin, Mohe
China Eastern Airlines	Beijing–Daxing, Dalian, Harbin, Shanghai–Pudong
Tianjin Airlines	Hailar

== See also ==
- List of airports in China
- List of the busiest airports in China
