= Chengdu Airlines =

Airline of China

Chengdu Airlines 成都航空

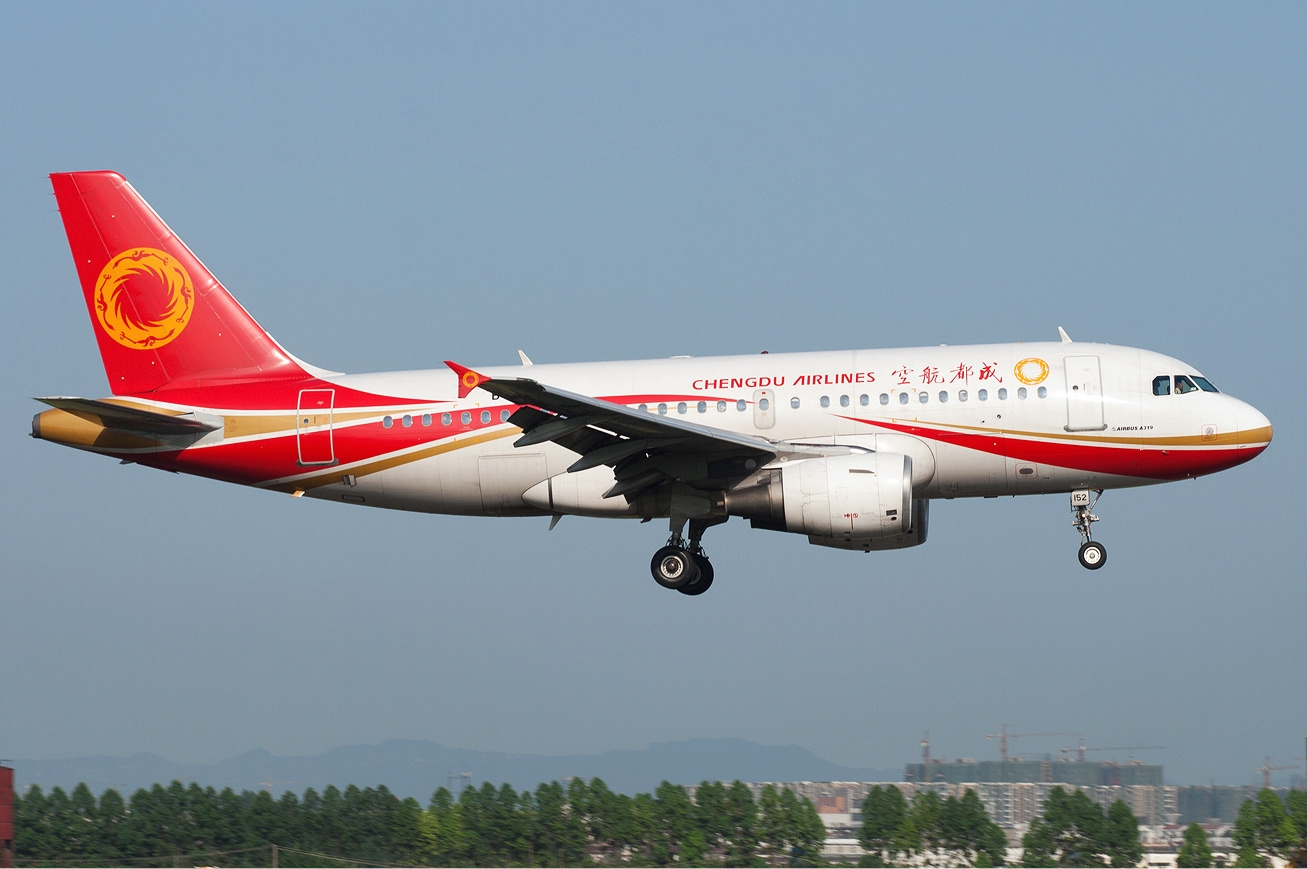
| IATA | ICAO | Call sign |
|---|---|---|
| EU | UEA | UNITED EAGLE |
- Founded: 2004; 22 years ago (as United Eagle Airlines)
- Commenced operations: 27 July 2005; 21 years ago
- Hubs: Chengdu-Shuangliu; Chengdu–Tianfu
- Fleet size: 82
- Destinations: 94
- Parent company: Sichuan Airlines
- Headquarters: Shuangliu District, Chengdu, Sichuan, China
- Website: www.cdal.com.cn

Chengdu Airlines is a Chinese airline headquartered in Shuangliu, Chengdu, Sichuan, China. A subsidiary of Sichuan Airlines, it operates a network of scheduled domestic passenger flights from its hub at Chengdu Shuangliu International Airport and Chengdu Tianfu International Airport.

== History ==
Originally named United Eagle Airlines Co., Ltd (鹰联航空公司; also known as UEAir), the company was founded in 2004 by a former executive of China Northwest Airlines, with the necessary funding being provided by the Vickers Financial Group. It received its first airliner, an Airbus A320 that previously had belonged to Air Jamaica, on 8 July 2005, and service began on 27 July. Another similar aircraft type, the slightly smaller Airbus A319, was put in service with United Eagle Airlines on December 2 of that same year.

In March 2009, Sichuan Airlines invested 200 million RMB (30 million USD) in United Eagle Airlines, thus holding 76 percent of the shares. In late 2009, Sichuan Airlines sold the shares to Chinese aircraft manufacturer Comac and to Chengdu Communications Investment Group. Following this ownership change, United Eagle Airlines placed an order for 30 Comac ARJ21s, the first of which initially was planned to be delivered in late 2010.

On 23 January 2010, the airline was renamed Chengdu Airlines.

== Destinations ==
As of April 2026 the airlines serves four countries.

Chengdu Airlines has codeshare agreements with the following airlines:

- China Southern Airlines
- Loong Air
- Sichuan Airlines

== Accidents and incidents ==
On April 5, 2013, a Chengdu Airlines 2319 (flight number: EU2229) on a regularly scheduled flight from Changdu Shuangliu was at the center of a safety incident when its crew performed a blind, unauthorized landing at Nanning Wuxu International Airport in inclement weather and against the advice of flight controllers. Following an investigation by the Southwestern Regional Administration of the Civil Aviation Administration of China, all three crew members were grounded and a safety team was dispatched to monitor Chengdu Airlines for a month of on-site supervision.

== Fleet ==
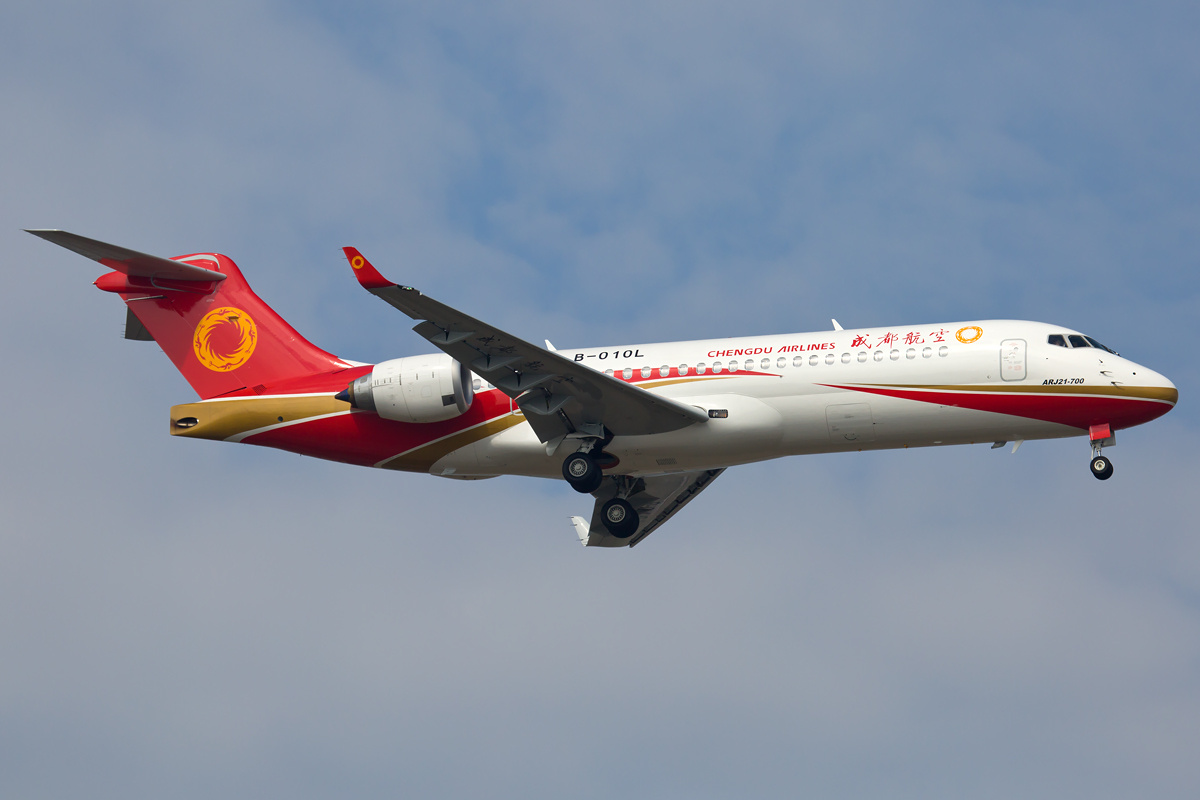
Chengdu Airlines COMAC ARJ21 (2014)

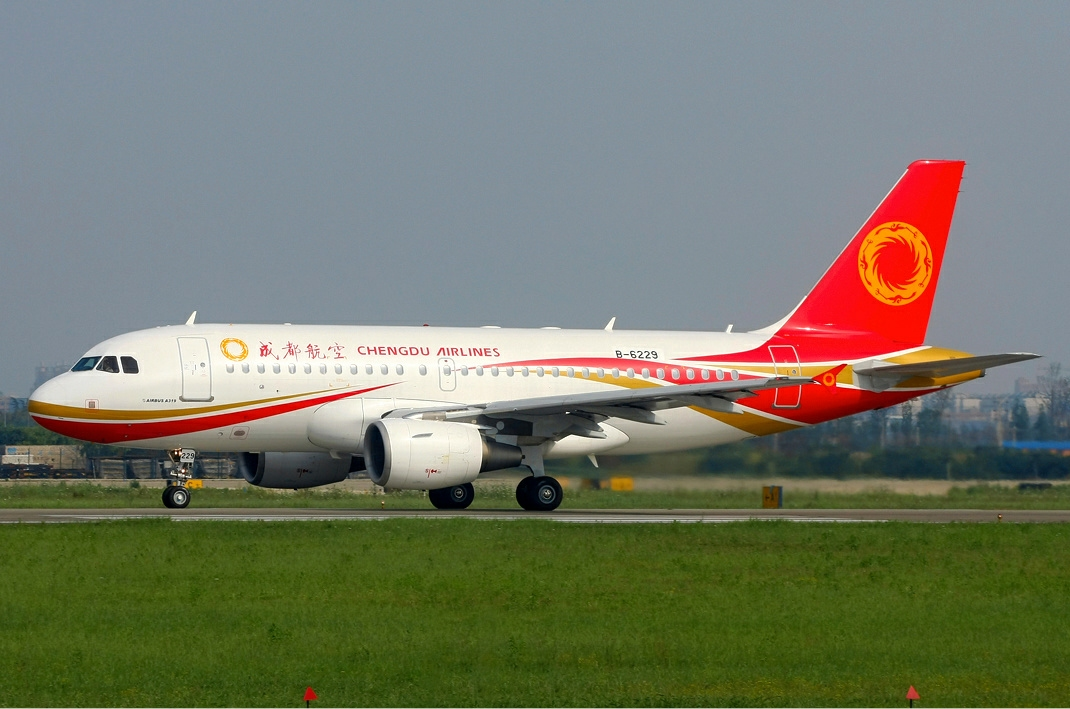
Chengdu Airlines Airbus A319 at Chengdu Shuangliu International Airport (2010)

As of August 2025, Chengdu Airlines operates the following aircraft:

Chengdu Airlines fleet
| Aircraft | In service | Orders | Passengers | | | Notes |
| Aircraft | In service | Orders | J | Y | Total | Notes |
|---|---|---|---|---|---|---|
| Airbus A319-100 | 4 | — | 12 | 108 | 120 | |
| Airbus A320-200 | 30 | — | — | 180 | 180 | |
| Airbus A320neo | 12 | — | TBA | | | |
| Airbus A321neo | 5 | — | TBA | | | |
| Comac C909 | 30 | 2 | — | 90 | 90 | Launch customer. 2 leased to VietJet Air. |
| Total | 81 | 2 | | | | |
