= Xiamen Bridge =

Xiamen Bridge 厦门大桥
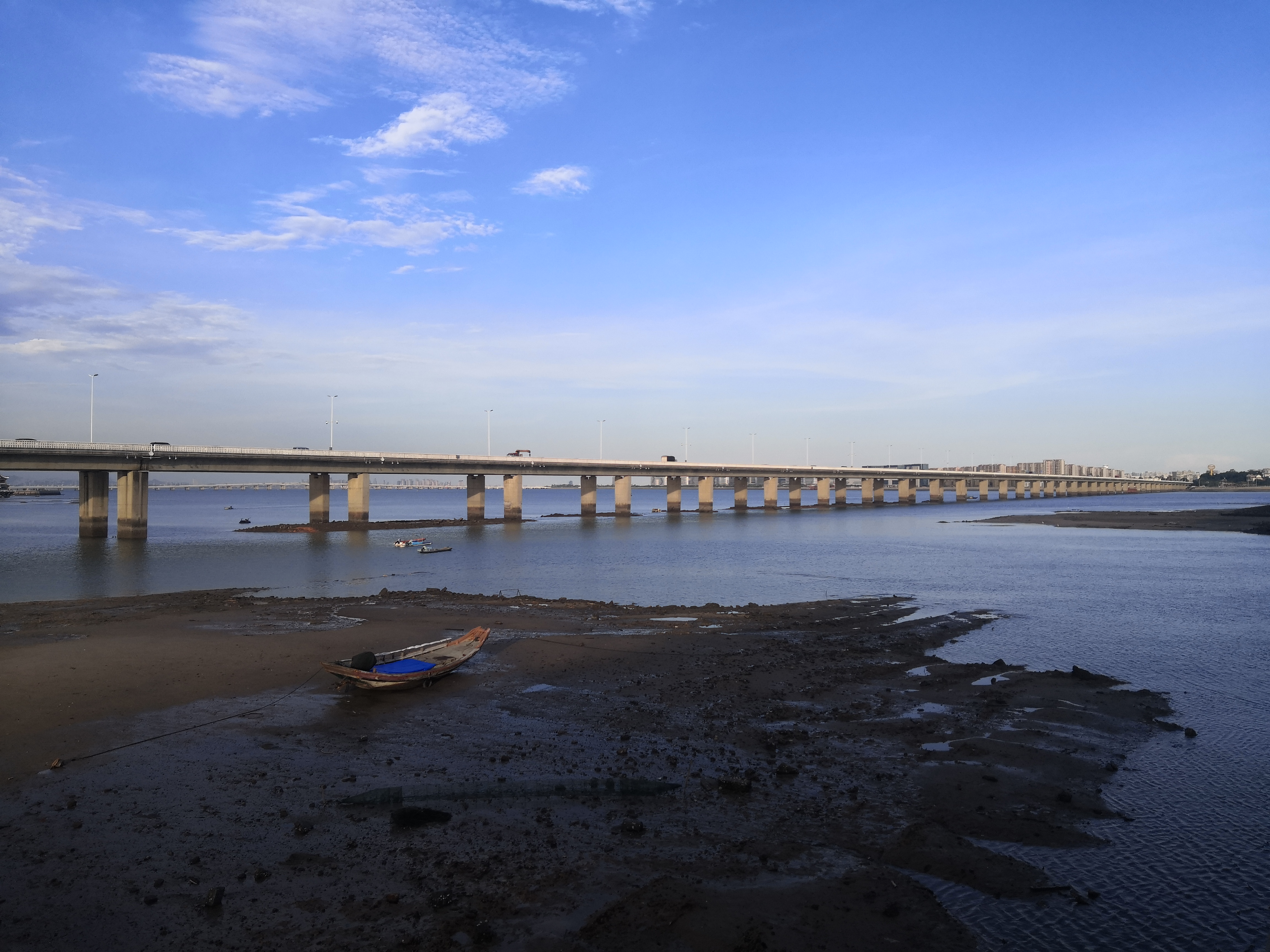
- View of Xiamen Bridge facing Xiamen
- Coordinates: 24.56053°N 118.09625°E

Characteristics
- Total length: 6.695 kilometres (4.160 mi)

History
- Construction start: October 14, 1987
- Construction end: April 1991

Xiamen Bridge is a highway cross-sea bridge on the northwest area of Xiamen Island, in Xiamen, Fujian, China. Construction took place from October 1, 1987 to April 1991, and the bridge was opened to vehicular traffic in May. Jiang Zemin, who was then the General Secretary of the Chinese Communist Party (paramount leader), created the calligraphy for the name of the bridge; since the ribbon-cutting in 1991, it has been China's first bridge crossing the sea. The Xiamen Bridge approach is 6695 metres long, going from Jimei Interchange to Gaoqi. The main bridge is 2270 metres long, 23.5 metres wide, and four lanes in either direction. The Gaoqi ramp is 855 metres and 23.5 metres wide. To indicate it as a First Level Bridge, there is a bridge head park nearby. If you keep following the bridge you'll get to Tongji Road (Provincial Route 206), China National Highway 319, Shenhai Expressway Xiamen Toll Booth, which can now be accessed using a pass card.

With the exception of the original Gaoji Causeway, Xiamen Island has the connections to the mainland of: Xiamen Bridge, Haicang Bridge, Jimei Bridge, Xinglin Bridge, and Xiang'an Tunnel.

== See also ==
- Xiamen Gaoqi International Airport
- Jimei District
- Gaoji Causeway
- Jimei Bridge
- Jimei University
- Huaqiao University
