= Jimei Bridge =

Bridge in Xiamen, China

Coordinates: 24.5735°N 118.1250°E

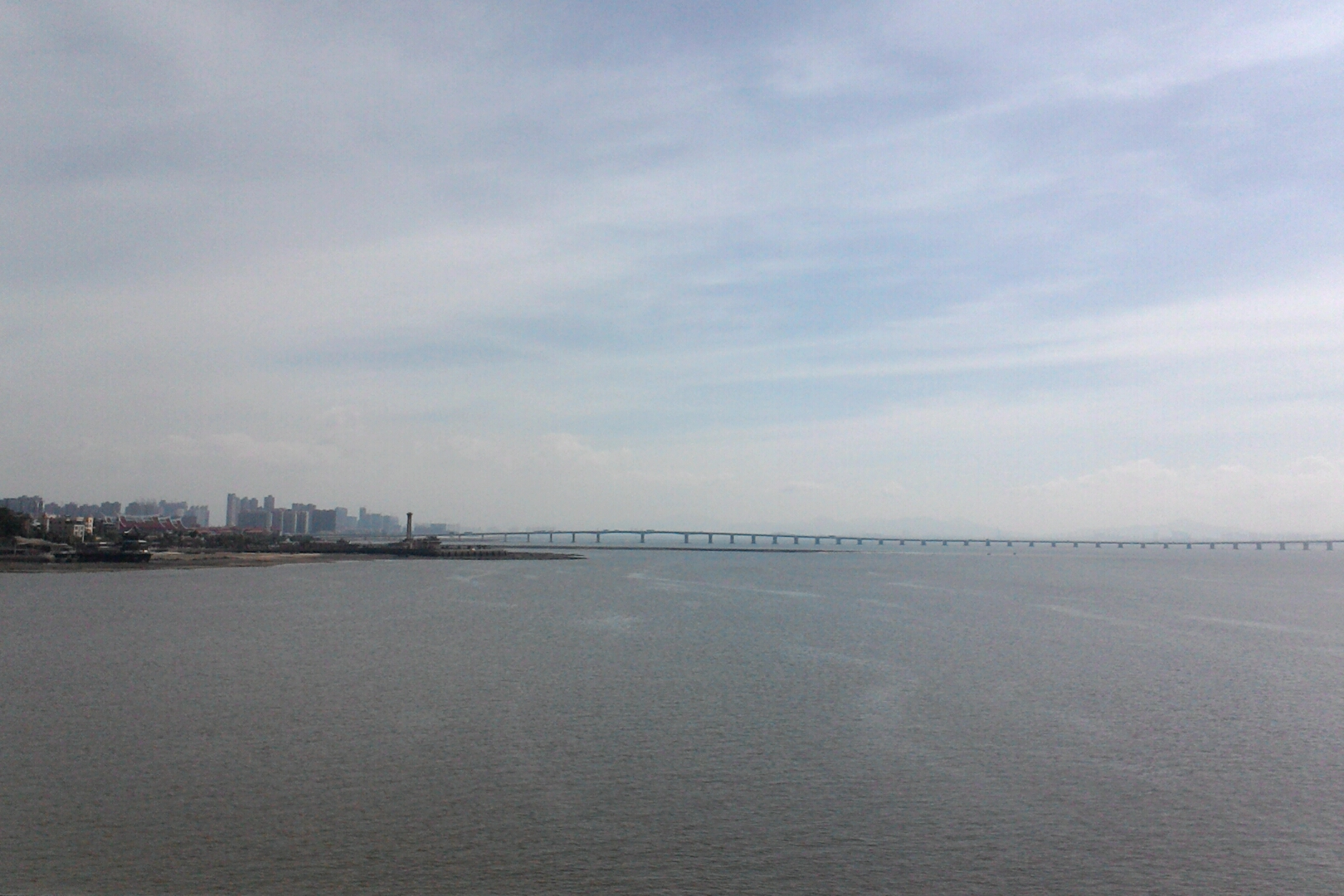
Jimei Bridge from Xiamen Bridge

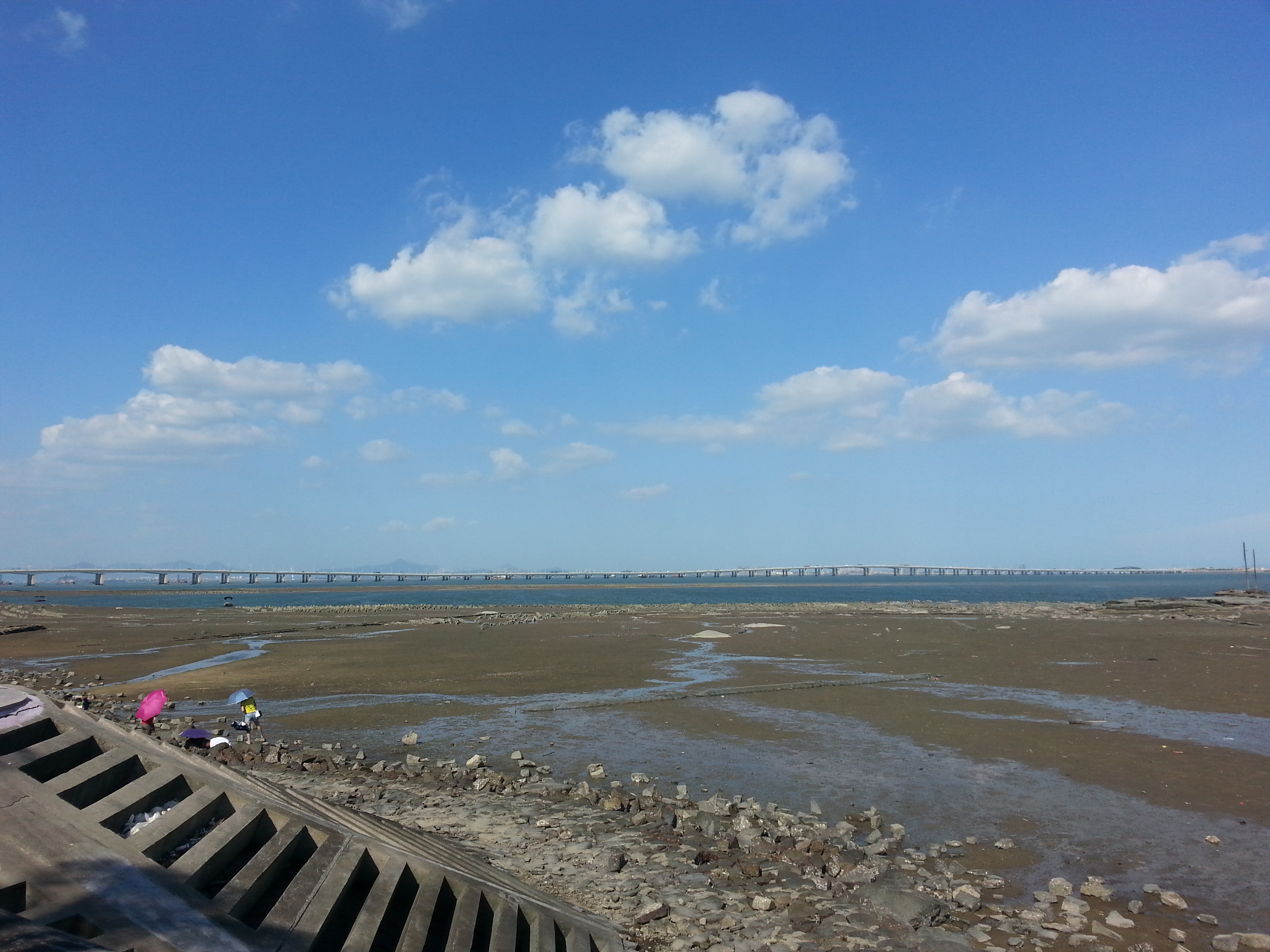
Jimei Bridge from Jimei Schools' Village

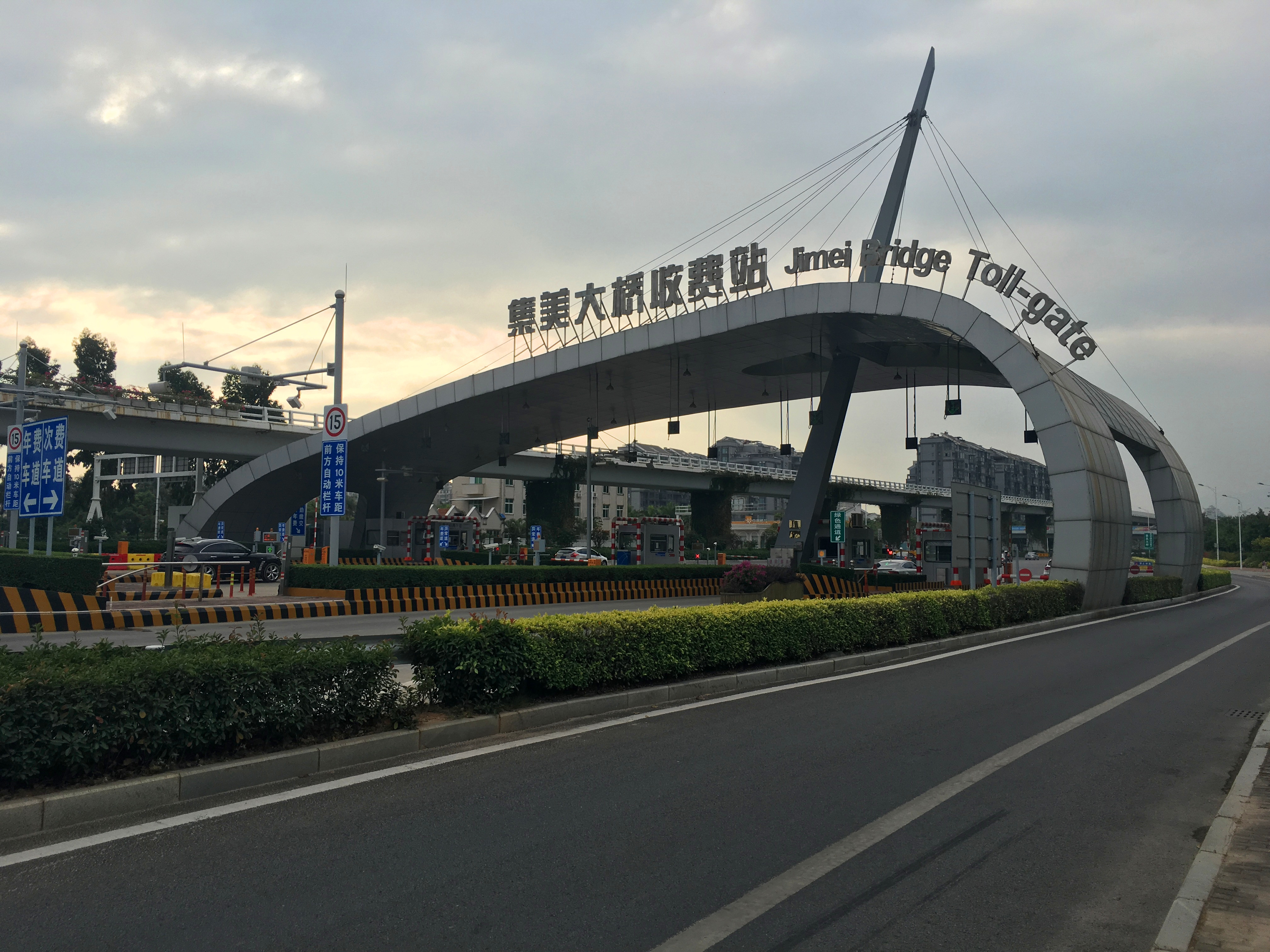
Jimei Bridge Toll-gate

Jimei Bridge is a highway bridge on the north side of Xiamen, Fujian, China. Constructed December 2006, opened to traffic July 1, 2008. It is Xiamen Island's third bridge connecting to the mainland. As the bridge's head is in proximity to Xiamen Gaoqi International Airport, a tunnel has been built under the runway to prevent the airport operations from being affected. The total length of the bridge is 10.057 kilometers: the bridge proper is 3.82 kilometers, and the tunnel is 1.4 kilometers. The bridge connects to five interchanges, and there are two toll stations. The estimated total investment of the project is 2.955 billion yuan.

The average width of Jimei Bridge is 36 metres, making it Xiamen's widest bridge. The bridge deck consists of three parts: three lanes of road in both directions for motor vehicles with a speed limit of 80 km/h, and a two-way two-lane special corridor in the middle for the Xiamen BRT with a speed limit of 60 km/h.

Jimei Bridge links roads on the mainland such as Binhai Ave, Tong'an Road and Shenhai Expressway with roads on the island such as Island Ring Road, Ludao Avenue, Yunding North Road, Jinshang Road, and Chenggong Avenue.

With the exception of the original Gaoji Causeway, Xiamen Island has the connections to the mainland of Jimei Bridge, Haicang Bridge, Xiamen Bridge, Xinglin Bridge, and Xiang'an Tunnel.

== Accident ==
On 2016 February 29, the plaque written by former Chinese President and General Secretary of the Communist Party Jiang Zemin with the bridge's name broke suddenly, occupying half a lane. No injuries were recorded.
