= Island Ring Road =

City thoroughfare making a loop around Xiamen Island, Xiamen, Fujian, China

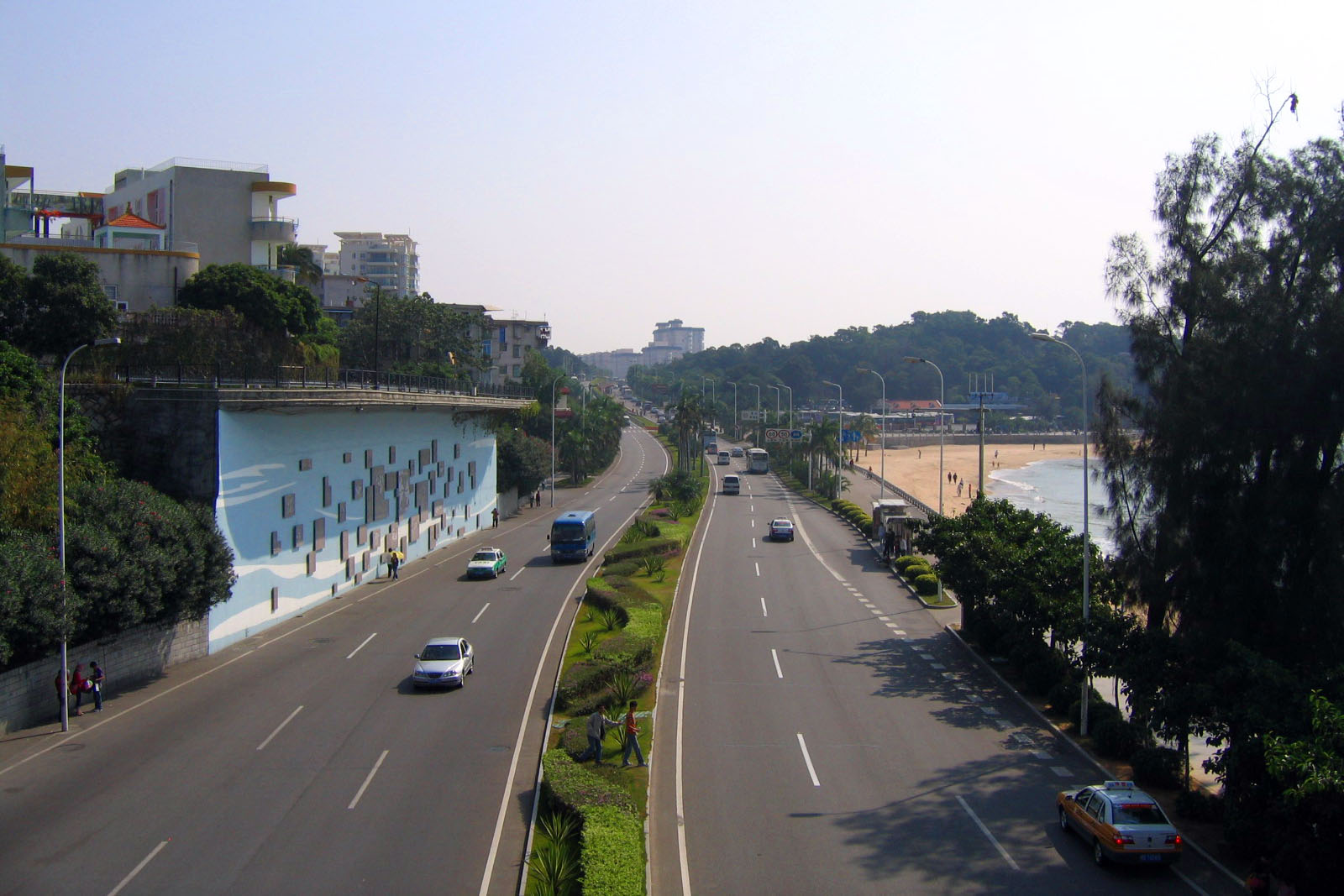
Island Ring Road near White City, Xiamen University

Island Ring Road or Huandao Road (Chinese: 环岛路) is a city thoroughfare making a loop around Xiamen Island, Xiamen, Fujian, China. It passes through the districts of Siming District and Huli District. It is 43 kilometers long, and its number is County Route 401.

== Overview ==
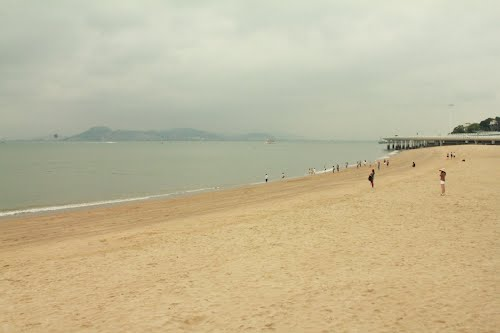
Beaches on Island Ring Road

Island Ring Road is 43 kilometers long. Construction of the road began in 1991 at a cost of 3.8 billion RMB, lasting for three weeks. Throughout its length, the road is either a four-lane divided highway or a six-lane divided highway.

Island Ring Road begins at Mt. Shigu Interchange in the northern region of Xiamen Island. From there it follows Shugang Road, Hubin West Road, and Lujiang Avenue near Gulangyu. It continues from Heping Wharf, along Yanwu Bridge, towards Xiamen University and Hulishan Fortress. The section of the road beginning at Hulishan Fortress is known as Island Ring South Road; it passes Zengcuo'an, Huangcuo, continuing towards Xiamen International Conference and Exhibition Center. At this point, the name of the road becomes Island Ring East Road. The route keeps heading in a northern direction till Wuyuan Bridge, in Wutong. It eventually follows Fangzhong Road to the south of Xiamen Gaoqi International Airport through the Gaoqi Interchange and Jiahe Road. Finally, it returns to its terminal of Mt. Shigu Interchange.

The 13 kilometers of Island Ring Road from White City of Xiamen University to Xiangshan constitute a notable tourist attraction of Xiamen. In 1997, they were listed as one of the "Top 20 Sceneries of Xiamen", and dubbed "Watching the Sea at East Ring." Here, the road is constructed up close to the sea; sights along the way include Lieyu, Dadan, two islets, and a large sign that reads, "one country, two systems".

== Bridges ==
=== Yanwu Bridge ===
Yanwu Bridge (演武大桥) forms the southwest portion of Island Ring Road from the port area of Xiamen to Baicheng in Xiamen University. It spans a total of 2.2 kilometers, going through interchanges at Chenggong Avenue, Yanwu, and Baicheng. The bridge opened to traffic on 2003 Sep 6th, costing a total of 560 million RMB. The bridge is constructed with fish-belly beams and concrete pillars, and it is painted in white. In order to avoid affecting the landscape of the coast, the bridge's lighting system is only attached to the guardrails, not the pillars. Since the bridge deck elevation of the lower bridge section of the Yanwu Bridge is only 5.5 meters, it is considered to be the closest bridge to the sea level in the world.

=== Wuyuan Bridge ===
Wuyuan Bridge (五缘大桥), formerly Zhongzhaiwan Bridge (钟宅湾大桥), was renamed to its current name in February 2006. The bridge spans the mouth of Wuyuan Bay, connecting the sections of Island Ring Road between Wutong and Dunshang. The bridge is a mid-supporting basket arch bridge built out of steel; its total length is 810 meters, the total length of the main portion is 34.9 meters, and its width is 32 meters. The bridge opened to traffic on 2004 Jul 2nd; it was China's third bridge of its kind, and the second bridge by span size.
