= YYA =

YYA may refer to:

- Yueyang Sanhe Airport, IATA code YYA
- Finno-Soviet Treaty of 1948 or YYA treaty
