= XMN =

XMN or xmn may refer to:

- XMN, the IATA code for Xiamen Gaoqi International Airport, Fujian Province, China
- xmn, the ISO 639-3 code for Manichaean Middle Persian language, a defunct language in Sasanian Empire
