= Xisha Airport =

Xisha Airport may refer to:

- Yulin Xisha Airport, old airport serving Yulin
- Yongxing Island Airport, serving Xisha (Paracel) Islands
