= Mangrovicoccus =

Scientific classification
- Domain: Bacteria
- Kingdom: Pseudomonadati
- Phylum: Pseudomonadota
- Class: Alphaproteobacteria
- Order: Rhodobacterales
- Family: Rhodobacteraceae
- Genus: Mangrovicoccus; Yu et al. 2018

Type species
- Mangrovicoccus ximenensis

Species
- M. ximenensis

Genus of bacteria

Mangrovicoccus is a Gram-negative and halotolerant genus of bacteria from the family of Rhodobacteraceae with one known species (Mangrovicoccus ximenensis). Mangrovicoccus ximenensis has been isolated from sediments from a mangrove forest from the Xiamen Island in China.
