= List of islands by name (X) =

This article features a list of islands sorted by their name beginning with the letter X.

== X ==
| Island's Name | Island group(s) | Country/Countries |
|---|---|---|
| Xiushan | Zhoushan Archipelago | China |
| Xiamen | City of Xiamen | China |

== See also ==
- List of islands (by country)
- List of islands by area
- List of islands by population
- List of islands by highest point
