= Ankang Fuqiang Airport =

Airport in Shaanxi, China

Ankang Fuqiang Airport 安康富强机场
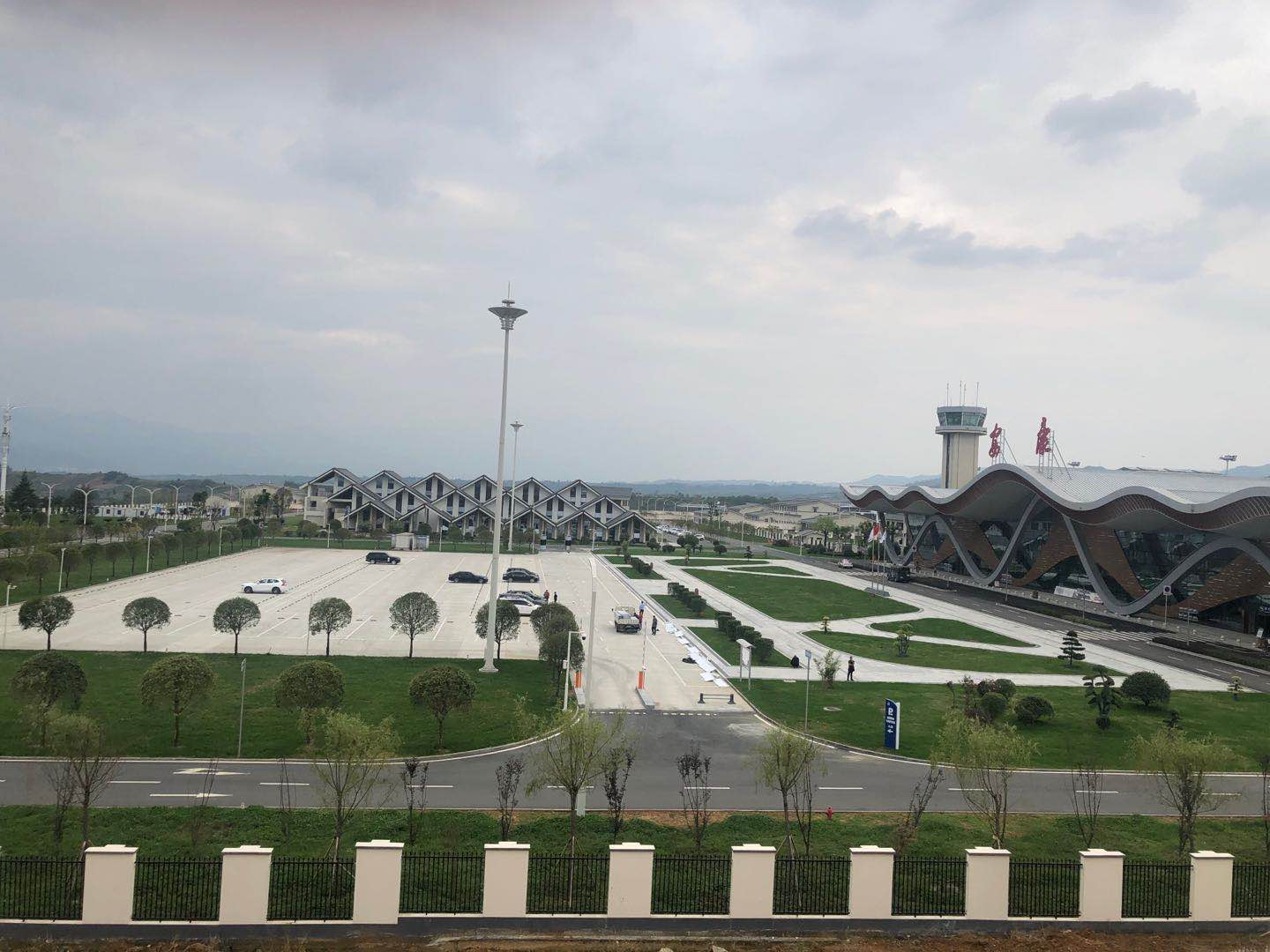
- IATA: AKA; ICAO: ZLAK

Summary
- Airport type: Public
- Serves: Ankang, Shaanxi, China
- Location: Wuli, Hanbin District
- Coordinates: 32.756944°N 108.874530°E

Map
- Location of airport in China

Runways
Direction	Length		Surface
Direction	m	ft	Surface
11/29	2,600	8,530

Statistics (2025)
- Passengers: 479,406
- Aircraft movements: 7,284
- Cargo (metric tons): 1,082.1

Ankang Fuqiang Airport
- Simplified Chinese: 安康富强机场
- Traditional Chinese: 安康富強機場
Transcriptions
Standard Mandarin
- Hanyu Pinyin: Ānkāng Fùqiáng Jīchǎng

Ankang Fuqiang Airport (IATA: AKA, ICAO: ZLAK) is an airport in Ankang, Shaanxi province, China, located 15 kilometres (9.3 mi) northwest of city center in the town of Wuli (formerly in Fuqiang Township, its namesake), Hanbin District. Proposed as a replacement of Ankang Wulipu Airport, the Fuqiang Airport project commenced in 2013, and its construction began in December 2015, with an estimated total investment of 2.35 billion yuan. The airport opened on 25 September 2020 for public use, as its first commercial flight China Southern Airlines CZ5269 arrived from Guangzhou.

== History ==
Before Ankang Fuqiang Airport began operation, the city was served by Ankang Wulipu Airport, which closed in September 2020, while Ankang Fuqiang Airport officially opened.

In 2008, Ankang City launched the airport relocation project. The airport's flight area is designed according to 4C standards, including a 2,600-meter-long runway and a 5,500-square-meter terminal building.

In January 2013, the relocation project of Ankang Airport was approved by the State Council and the Central Military Commission. In August 2014, the National Development and Reform Commission approved the feasibility study report, and construction began on December 30, 2015. The total investment in the airport was 2.3445 billion yuan.

On August 20, 2018, Ankang Airport completed the runway earthwork; on March 5, 2020, the runway concrete work was completed. On May 21, 2020, Ankang Airport successfully completed its calibration flight; on July 24, it successfully completed its test flight; on September 16, it passed industry acceptance; and on September 18, it obtained its airport operating license. On September 25, China Southern Airlines flight CZ5269, which arrived from Guangzhou, made its maiden voyage from Ankang Fuqiang Airport.

== Facilities ==
The airport has a 2,600-meter runway and a 5,500-square-meter terminal building. It was designed with the capacity to serve 300,000 passengers and process 750 tons of cargo per year.

== Airlines and destinations ==
Airlines	Destinations
Beijing Capital Airlines	Hangzhou
China Eastern Airlines	Shanghai–Pudong
China Southern Airlines	Guangzhou, Shenzhen
China United Airlines	Beijing–Daxing
Spring Airlines	Changzhou, Lanzhou
Tianjin Airlines	Changsha, Urumqi, Xiamen Yulin (Shaanxi)
XiamenAir	Wuhan

== See also ==
- List of airports in China
- List of the busiest airports in China
