= Ankang Wulipu Airport =

Ankang Wulipu Airport 安康五里铺机场
- IATA: ~~AKA~~; ICAO: ~~ZLAK~~

Summary
- Airport type: Public
- Location: Ankang, Shaanxi, China
- Elevation AMSL: 262 m / 860 ft
- Coordinates: 32°42′29″N 108°55′52″E

Map
- Location of airport in China

Runways
Direction	Length		Surface
Direction	m	ft	Surface
11/29	1,600	5,249	Concrete

Statistics (2021)
- Passengers: 257,017
- Aircraft movements: 62,070
- Cargo (metric tons): 89.4

Ankang Wulipu Airport (Chinese: 安康五里铺机场) was an airport serving the city of Ankang in Shaanxi Province, China. It was located in the town of Wuli in Hanbin District, 9 kilometres (5.6 mi) from the city center. The new Ankang Fuqiang Airport replaced the Wulipu Airport when it opened on September 25, 2020.

== Facilities ==
The airport had one runway that is 1,600 meters long and 30 meters wide (class 3C), and a 1,200 square-meter terminal building.

== History ==
With the threat of the Empire of Japan following the Manchurian Incident of 1931, General Yang Hucheng first built the airfield in Ankang in 1933 for preparations in the support of anticipated air force operations against Imperial Japanese military ambitions; this was the airbase where Chinese Air Force war hero Colonel Gao Zhihang transited en route after receiving a new inventory of Polikarpov I-16 fighter planes in November 1937, but was killed in a Japanese bombing attack in his next refueling stop at Zhoujiakou airfield. The airfield was deemed unsafe for use however, and was rebuilt as Wulipu in 1938, and listed as the 59th Air Station of the Nationalist Air Force of China. After the attack on Pearl Harbor, the airport was in use by the United States Army Air Forces Fourteenth Air Force as part of the China Defensive Campaign. The Americans called the airbase Ankang Airfield, and flew photo-reconnaissance aircraft from the airport over Japanese-held territory on intelligence gathering combat missions between April and August 1945. In addition, P-61 Black Widow night interceptor aircraft provided protection against night Japanese bomber and fighter attacks from April until the end of the war in September. The Americans closed their facilities at the airport in early October 1945.

Civil flights first started in the 1964 but ceased in 1986. The airport was expanded to its current size in 1993 and served civil flights again from 1995 until July 2001, when the opening of the Xi'an-Ankang Railway forced the airport to close again. Flights resumed for the third time in April 2006 before suspended again in 2016.

== See also ==
- List of airports in China
- List of the busiest airports in China
