= Yulin Yuyang Airport =

Yulin Yuyang Airport 榆林榆阳机场
- IATA: UYN; ICAO: ZLYL

Summary
- Airport type: Public
- Serves: Yulin, Shaanxi
- Location: Xiaojihan, Yuyang District, Yulin
- Opened: March 2008
- Hub for: Tianjin Airlines
- Elevation AMSL: 1,186 m (3,891 ft)
- Coordinates: 38°21′40″N 109°35′47″E
- Website: yulin.cwag.com

Map
- Location of airport in China

Runways
Direction	Length		Surface
Direction	m	ft	Surface
16/34	2,800	9,186	Asphalt

Statistics (2025)
- Passengers: 3,106,499
- Aircraft movements: 29,836
- Cargo (metric tons): 16,786.2

Yulin Yuyang Airport
- Simplified Chinese: 榆林榆阳机场
- Traditional Chinese: 榆林榆陽機場
Transcriptions
Standard Mandarin
- Hanyu Pinyin: Yúlín Yúyáng Jīchǎng

Yulin Yuyang Airport (IATA: UYN, ICAO: ZLYL) is an airport serving the city of Yulin in Shaanxi Province, China. The airport opened in March 2008, replacing the old Yulin Xisha Airport. The airport is located 15.5 km (9.6 mi) from the urban area of Yulin. Its construction started in 2005 and it was classified as a 4C grade civil regional airport.

== History ==
The predecessor of Yulin Yuyang Airport was Yulin Xisha Airport, which was located in the city. Yulin Xisha Airport was a domestic civil airport located in Yulin City, Shaanxi Province, China. Construction began in 1985 and it opened in 1988. It was 2.6 kilometers from the city center, with a runway 1800 meters long and 30 meters wide, a 9000-square-meter apron, and a 1586-square-meter terminal building, covering an area of 1078 mu (approximately 78 hectares). The airport was classified as a 3C airport and is equipped with communication, navigation, meteorological, departure services, and logistical support facilities. It could accommodate Y7, Dash 8, and D328 aircraft.

The Yulin Xisha Airport had a short runway and outdated facilities, capable of handling only small aircraft, and it was surrounded by urban development. With Yulin's rapid economic growth and the construction of the national energy and chemical base, the old airport could no longer meet passenger demand; nearly a hundred travelers each day were forced to switch to other modes of transport due to the lack of available seats. As a result, in February 2005, the State Council and the Central Military Commission approved the relocation and reconstruction of Yulin Airport. The new airport was built to 4C standards, with a 2,800‑meter runway capable of accommodating Boeing 737 series aircraft and Airbus A319/A320 and other Class‑C types. Construction of the new airport began in December 2005, reached completion conditions by the end of 2007, and underwent inspection, test flights, and relocation procedures in the first half of 2008.

Yulin Yuyang Airport passed its completion inspection and entered operation on April 10, 2008. The airport was originally designed for an annual passenger throughput of 350,000 and a cargo capacity of 1,400 tons by the target year of 2015. By 2010, however, passenger traffic had already reached 904,000, and projections indicated that throughput would exceed two million within the following five years. The existing terminal and airfield facilities could no longer keep pace with this rapid growth, making expansion urgently necessary. According to the new development plan, Yulin Airport will add 122,810 square meters of new construction in the near term, including a 55,000‑square‑meter terminal building. The expansion is designed to support an annual capacity of five million passengers and 10,000 tons of cargo.

In 2012, Yulin Yuyang Airport's passenger throughput surpassed the one‑million mark, creating an urgent need for expansion and upgrades. The Phase II expansion project began in May 2017. In October 2018, the airport completed the transition to a 3,200‑meter runway, becoming the first 4D‑class regional airport in Shaanxi Province. After the core component of the Phase II project—the T2 terminal—was completed and put into service in September 2020, construction of the northern concourse of the Phase II terminal began in June 2021. This section passed industry acceptance by the Civil Aviation Administration of China's Northwest Regional Administration in December 2024, and on December 9, 2025, the air‑traffic information building, control tower, and international cargo facilities also successfully passed completion inspection. With this, the multi‑year Phase II expansion project entered its final stage.

According to the Yulin Railway and Civil Aviation Development Center, the Phase II expansion has now been fully completed. The T2 terminal at Yulin Yuyang Airport has expanded to 55,000 square meters, the number of boarding bridges has increased to 14, and the number of aircraft stands has grown to 38. The airport's service and operational capacity has been significantly enhanced, placing it among the leading regional airports in Northwest China.

== Airlines and destinations ==
Airlines	Destinations
China Eastern Airlines	Dalian, Kunming, Shanghai–Hongqiao, Wuhan, Xiamen, Xi'an
China Express Airlines	Changchun, Harbin, Xi'an
China Southern Airlines	Guangzhou, Zhengzhou
China United Airlines	Beijing–Daxing, Chengdu–Tianfu, Lanzhou
GX Airlines	Changsha, Chongqing, Haikou, Jinan, Nanning, Xi'an
Hainan Airlines	Beijing–Capital, Chengdu–Tianfu, Shenzhen
Juneyao Air	Hangzhou, Nanjing, Shanghai–Pudong, Xi'an
Tianjin Airlines	Ankang, Beihai, Changsha, Chongqing, Dalian, Guiyang, Hanzhong, Jining, Nanchang, Nantong, Qingdao, Quanzhou, Sanya, Shijiazhuang, Shenyang, Tianjin, Wenzhou, Wuhan, Xiamen, Xi'an, Xuzhou, Yangzhou, Yinchuan, Yueyang, Zhengzhou, Zhuhai

== See also ==
- List of airports in China
- List of the busiest airports in China
