= Yueyang Sanhe Airport =

Yueyang Sanhe Airport 岳阳三荷机场
- IATA: YYA; ICAO: ZGYY

Summary
- Airport type: Public
- Serves: Yueyang, Hunan, China
- Opened: 26 December 2018; 7 years ago
- Elevation AMSL: 70 m (230 ft)
- Coordinates: 29.314°N 113.278°E

Map
- Location of airport in Hunan

Runways
Direction	Length		Surface
Direction	m	ft	Surface
18/36	2,600	8,530	Concrete

Statistics (2025)
- Passengers: 316,609
- Aircraft movements: 2,978
- Cargo (metric tons): 6.0

Yueyang Sanhe Airport
- Simplified Chinese: 岳阳三荷机场
- Traditional Chinese: 岳陽三荷機場
Transcriptions
Standard Mandarin
- Hanyu Pinyin: Yuèyáng Sānhé Jīchǎng

Yueyang Sanhe Airport (IATA: YYA, ICAO: ZGYY) is an airport in the city of Yueyang in Hunan Province, China. Its construction was approved by the State Council of China and the Central Military Commission on 31 July 2013. The airport opened on December 26, 2018.

== History ==
Yueyang Sanhe Airport began its planning and site selection process in 2009. The site selection process initially narrowed down the options from seven to three, and ultimately Sanhe Town was chosen.

On February 10, 2011, the Civil Aviation Administration of China approved the construction site for Yueyang Airport. In July 2013, the State Council and the Central Military Commission officially approved the Yueyang Sanhe Airport project. On September 20, 2013, the Yueyang Government established Yueyang Sanhe Airport Investment, Construction and Management Co., Ltd., as the airport project owner and legal entity, responsible for airport investment, financing, engineering construction and management. Yueyang Sanhe Airport is located approximately 18 kilometers from the city center. Built to "4D" planning and "4C" construction standards, the project covers 2,273 mu (approximately 148 hectares) of land, with a 2,600-meter runway and a 15,000-square-meter terminal building. Approval was granted by the Ministry of Environmental Protection on July 8, 2015; and by the National Development and Reform Commission on August 3, 2015.

On December 10, 2015, the groundbreaking ceremony for Yueyang Sanhe Airport in Hunan Province was held. Construction officially commenced on April 26, 2016. On August 6, 2018, a calibration flight was conducted at Sanhe Airport. On August 24, 2018, a China Southern Airlines Airbus A320/B1800 aircraft conducted a test flight, taking off from Changsha Huanghua Airport and landing at Yueyang Sanhe Airport.

In October 2018, all construction tasks were completed and the airport underwent industry acceptance and certification inspection. On November 2, 2018, the airport officially obtained its operating license. Yueyang Sanhe Airport officially opened to traffic on December 26, 2018.

== Facilities ==
The airport has a 2,600-meter runway (class 4C) and a 6,000-square-meter terminal building. It is projected to handle 600,000 passengers and 1,800 tons of cargo annually by 2020.

== Airlines and destinations ==
Passenger

Airlines	Destinations
Beijing Capital Airlines	Haikou, Xi'an
Chengdu Airlines	Chengdu–Tianfu, Shanghai–Pudong
China United Airlines	Beijing–Daxing, Quanzhou
Colorful Guizhou Airlines	Chongqing, Ningbo
Donghai Airlines	Chongqing
Hainan Airlines	Beijing–Capital
Tianjin Airlines	Haikou, Xiamen, Xi'an, Yulin (Shaanxi)

Cargo

Airlines	Destinations
Tianjin Air Cargo	Bangkok-Suvarnabhumi, Dhaka, Hanoi

== See also ==
- List of airports in China
- List of the busiest airports in China
