= Yulin Xisha Airport =

Coordinates: 38°16′12″N 109°43′48.6″E

- IATA: ~~UYN~~; ICAO: ~~ZLYL~~

Summary
- Serves: Yulin, Shaanxi, China
- Closed: March 2008
- Interactive map of Yulin Xisha Airport

Runways
Direction	Length		Surface
Direction	m	ft	Surface
15/33	1,500	4,921

Yulin Xisha Airport is a former airport in Yulin, Shaanxi China. The official Yulin airport codes were changed to the new Yulin Yuyang Airport when the latter was opened in March 2008.

Yulin Xisha Airport was the first airport in Yulin, officially opened in 1988, but the planned expansion of the airport was cancelled when it failed to meet the requirements for new developments. Instead, the construction of a new airport was ordered and Yulin Xisha Airport has been demolished.

The airport has one runway (15/33) that is approximately 1,500 metres long.

== See also ==
- List of airports in China
- List of the busiest airports in China
