= Haicang Bridge =

Haicang Bridge 海滄大橋
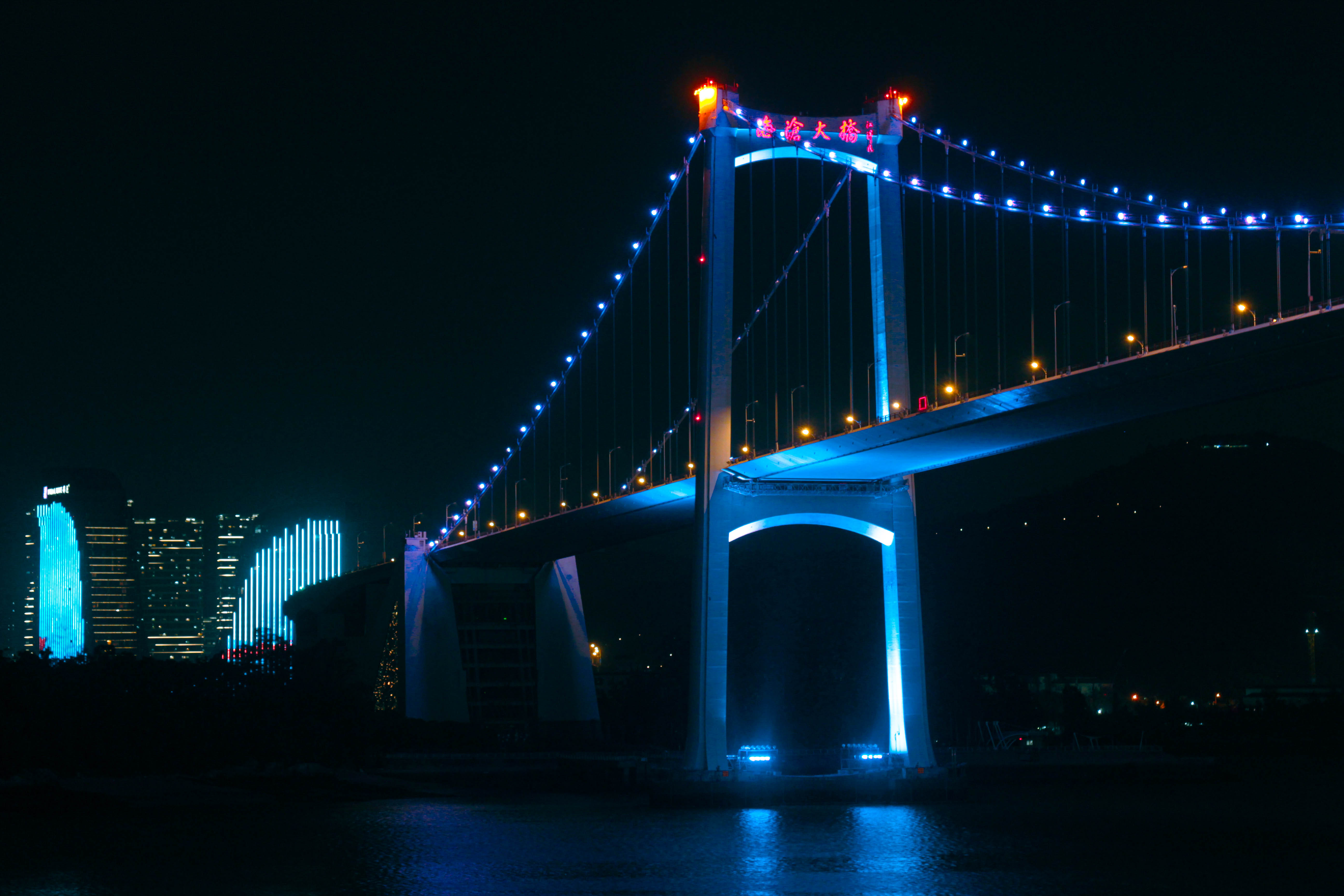
- Coordinates: 24°29′49.5″N 118°04′6.5″E
- Carries: 6 lanes of provincial road 201
- Crosses: East China Sea to Xiamen Island
- Locale: Fujian, China

Characteristics
- Design: Suspension bridge
- Total length: 5,926 metres (19,442 ft)
- Longest span: 648 metres (2,126 ft)

History
- Construction end: 1999

Location
- Interactive map of Haicang Bridge

Haicang Bridge (simplified Chinese: 海沧大桥; traditional Chinese: 海滄大橋; pinyin: Hǎicāng Dàqiáo; Pe̍h-ōe-jī: Hái-chhong Tōa-kiô) is a suspension bridge located in Xiamen, Fujian Province, China. Built in 1999, it has a main span of 648 meters.

Haicang Bridge links Xiamen Island (where the city center is located) with the city's Haicang District located on the mainland.

== Nearby attractions ==
- Dong'an tourist area
- Bridge Museum
- Huoshao Islet Fun Island
- Youth Science Museum
- Xi'an Park
- Mt. Taiping leisure resort area

== See also ==
- List of longest suspension bridge spans
