= Xiamen Gaoqi International Airport =

Airport serving Xiamen, Fujian, China

Xiamen Gaoqi International Airport 厦门高崎国际机场
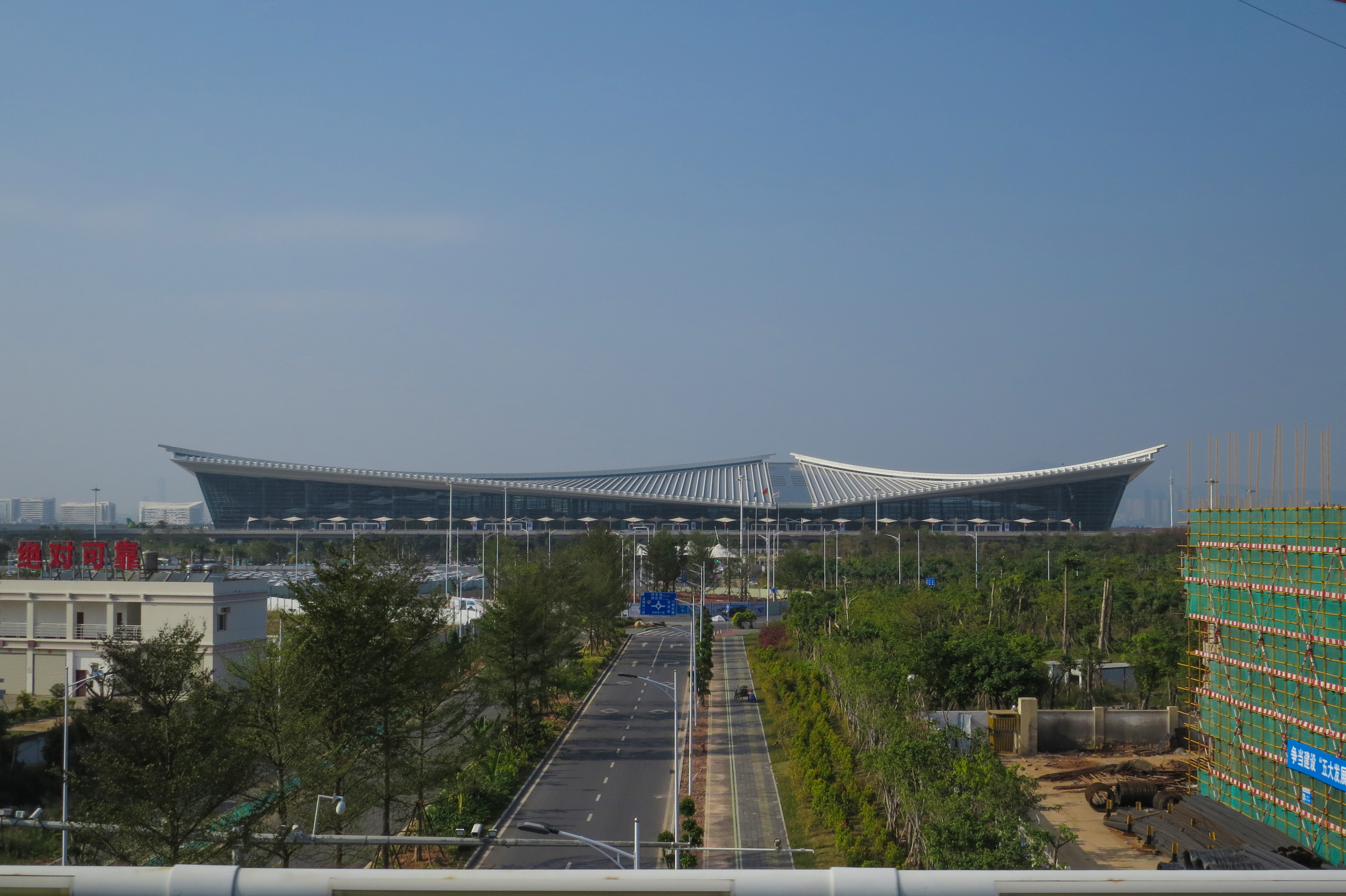
- IATA: XMN; ICAO: ZSAM

Summary
- Airport type: Public
- Operator: Xiamen International Airport Group Co., Ltd. (XIAGC)
- Serves: Xiamen
- Location: Huli, Xiamen, Fujian, China
- Opened: 22 October 1983
- Hub for: XiamenAir
- Focus city for: China Eastern Airlines; Shandong Airlines; Spring Airlines
- Elevation AMSL: 18 m (59 ft)
- Coordinates: 24°32′39″N 118°07′40″E

Maps
- CAAC airport chart
- Location in Fujian Location in China

Runways
Direction	Length		Surface
Direction	m	ft	Surface
05/23	3,400	11,155	Asphalt

Statistics (2025)
- Passengers: 29,193,712
- Aircraft movements: 198,582
- Cargo: 377,213.6
- Source: List of the busiest airports in the People's Republic of China

Xiamen Gaoqi International Airport
- Simplified Chinese: 厦门高崎国际机场
- Traditional Chinese: 廈門高崎國際機場
- Hokkien POJ: Ē-mn̂g Kò-kiâ Kok-chè Ki-tiû
Transcriptions
Standard Mandarin
- Hanyu Pinyin: Xiàmén Gāoqí Guójì Jīchǎng
- Wade–Giles: Hsia^{4}-mên^{2} Kao^{1}-ch'i^{2} Kuo^{2}-chi^{4} Chi^{1}-ch'ang^{2}
Southern Min
- Hokkien POJ: Ē-mn̂g Kò-kiâ Kok-chè Ki-tiû

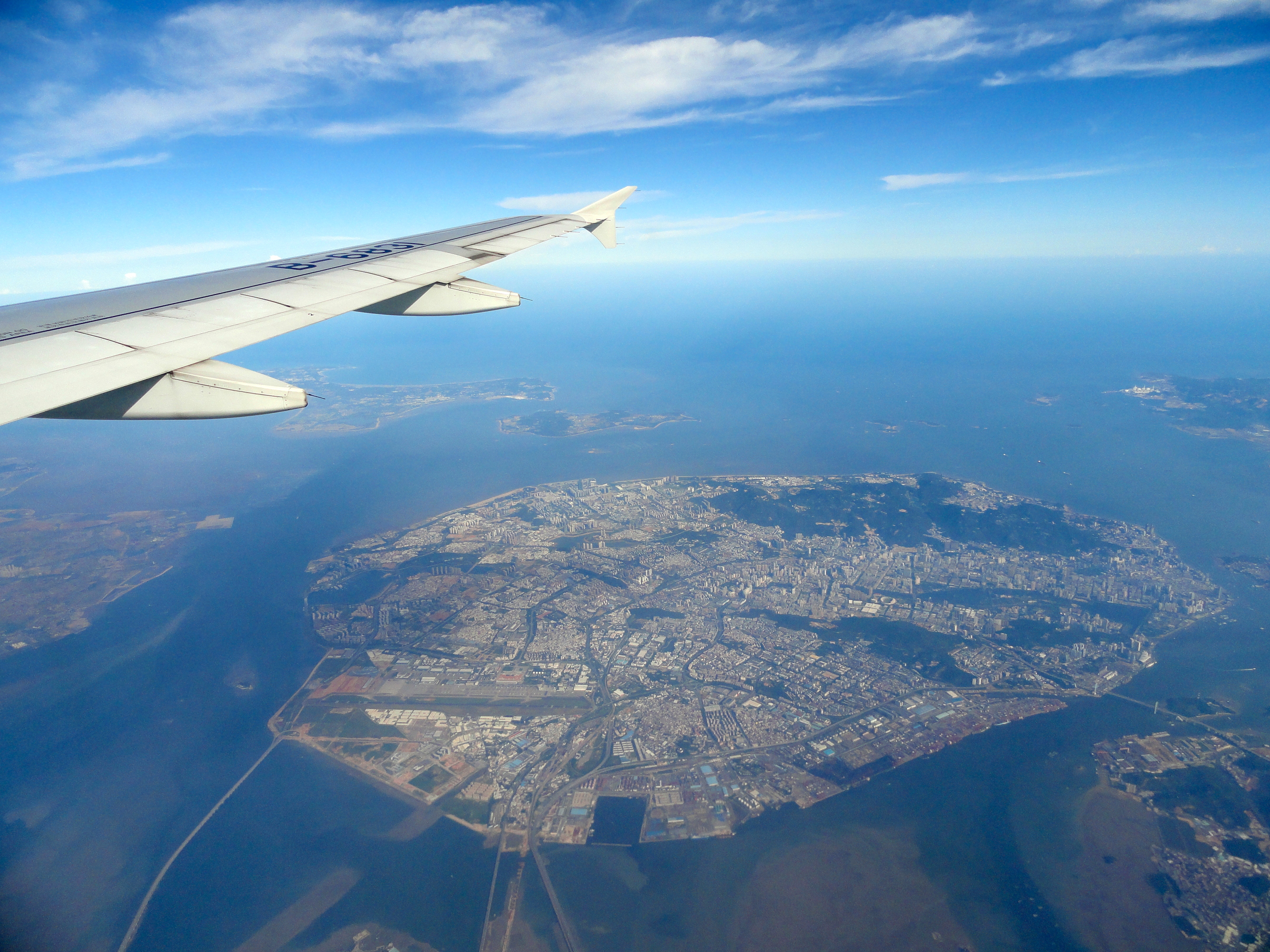
Aerial view of Xiamen Island. Gaoqi Airport can be seen in the bottom left of the island.

Xiamen Gaoqi International Airport (IATA: XMN, ICAO: ZSAM) is an international airport serving the city of Xiamen in East China's Fujian province. It is the main airline hub for XiamenAir and TAECO, an aircraft maintenance provider. It is located on the north side of Xiamen Island, 10 km (6.2 mi) away from the city's downtown area. It was originally built by Imperial Japan during their occupation of China, and was later converted to exclusive civilian use once the Japanese surrendered World War II. A couple of renovations were made in the early- to mid-1950s under the Communist government, but the airport laid abandoned until after a second renovation in 1955 due to fears of shelling from the nearby Kinmen Island of the Nationalists.

In 1983, the airport re-opened with funding from the Kuwait Fund for further renovations and construction, and over the next decade passenger traffic rapidly increased so that it warranted the construction of Terminal 2 in 1993. In 1996, Terminal 3 was opened. Terminal 1 was demolished in 2012, and at the same time, Terminal 2 became the domestic area for Terminal 3. Construction of Terminal 4 started in October 2011 and was completed in 2014.

In 2025, Gaoqi Airport was listed as the 14th busiest airport in China in terms of cargo traffic, and the 16th busiest in terms of passenger traffic with 29,193,712 passengers, and the 17th busiest airport by traffic movements.

On 24 December 2026, the airport will cease all civilian traffic once Xiamen Xiang'an International Airport is completed and commences operations.

== History ==
=== Early history ===
While Imperial Japan occupied Xiamen during World War II in 1941, they constructed the airport east of Gaoqi Village as a military airfield to defend against the U.S. military. It concurrently also served scheduled flights between Xiamen and Taipei, Fuzhou, Guangzhou, and Hong Kong. After the end of the Second Sino-Japanese War, the airport was reclaimed by the Nationalist government, who converted it for civilian use. It was now under the management of the Xiamen office of the Civil Aviation Administration. In February 1949, the management was transferred to the Republic of China Air Force who established the 242nd Supply Squadron to manage the airport. On 24 August that year, the last plane departed the airport carrying high-ranking Nationalist officials en route to Taipei before it shut down due to the People's Liberation Army occupying the area.

After the PLA occupied mainland China, the airport underwent maintenance and expansion to prepare for military operations against Taiwan, which was completed in 1952. In 1955, it underwent a second renovation. However, due to the airport being close to the attack radius of Kinmen Island, the airport never reopened, and henceforth was left abandoned.

=== Current airport ===
In 1982, the airport received a loan of the equivalent of 21 million U.S. Dollars from the Kuwait Fund to fund the expansion with the assistance of the then-director of the National Development and Reform Commission Jiang Zemin. The expansion commenced in January 1982, and the airport was re-opened on 22 October 1983 as the first airport in China to be built with foreign funding and managed by a local government.

Once the airport was re-opened, Terminal 1 officially commenced operations with CAAC flight 265 to Shanghai being the first flight to depart, to massive fanfare. In October 1993, Terminal 2 was built and opened to alleviate passenger traffic of Terminal 1. On 8 November 1996, Terminal 3 was opened, becoming the largest and the most state-of-the-art passenger air terminal in China at the time.

On 5 May 2012, the renovated Terminal 2 was re-opened as a section of Terminal 3 to serve domestic flights, with Terminal 1 being demolished and the area being turned into parking space. On 8 December 2014, the airport surpassed the 20 million passenger throughput threshold. On 28 December 2014, Terminal 4 was opened, rendering the airport capable of operating with two terminals.

At 2:00 a.m. local time on 4 December 2017, an Air France A380 became the first of its type to land at Xiamen, with the reason being for maintenance being performed by TAECO.

To prevent the spread of inbound COVID-19 cases from abroad, the second international/Hong Kong/Macau/Taiwan arrivals hall located in the former Terminal 2 commenced operations on 23 October 2021 to handle arriving passengers from the given areas. It had seven sections: the customs epidemiological investigation area, sampling area, disinfection area, symptomatic medical screening area, border inspection hall, baggage claim and inspection area, and logistics office area. It also features an independent partitioned air conditioning system. The border inspection area is divided into two sections: passengers requiring medical attention or transfer are inspected in a dedicated inspection room on the second floor; normal passengers complete entry procedures in the inspection hall on the first floor. The waiting and inspection halls cover approximately 700 m^{2} (7,500 sq ft) and has 12 manual inspection areas and one staff-only inspection area, all equipped with intelligent verification desks, translation machines, and intelligent gate systems. At 6:00 a.m. on 8 January 2023, the arrival area ceased operations. Simultaneously, the international/Hong Kong/Macau/Taiwan arrival area at Terminal 3 resumed operations, and all flights and passengers from the given areas proceed there for immigration and customs.

=== New destinations ===
KLM began the first intercontinental route out of Xiamen, to Amsterdam, on 27 March 2011. Since then, long-haul traffic has expanded, with XiamenAir launching flights to Amsterdam, Sydney, Melbourne, Vancouver, Los Angeles, Paris, Doha and Malé after taking delivery of the Boeing 787.

=== Relocation and closure ===
Since the opening of Terminal 4, Gaoqi Airport can no longer expand. For this reason, a new airport is currently under construction on Dadeng Island, Xiang'an District, currently known as Xiamen Xiang'an International Airport. When completed in late 2026, it will have two new runways, a 550,000 m^{2} (140 acres) terminal, be able to handle up to 45 million passengers, and have subway links to the Xiamen Railway Station. Gaoqi Airport will cease all civilian operations once Xiang'an Airport opens.

== Current terminals ==
=== Terminal 3 ===
Terminal 3 (containing the original Terminal 2) is a passenger terminal which handles both international and domestic flights on air carriers including XiamenAir, China Southern Airlines, and Hebei Airlines.

On 28 August 2024, Terminal 3 underwent an expansion of the departures area covering 2,600 m^{2} (28,000 sq ft), consisting of the construction of four new boarding gates (numbered 22, 23, 25, and 26); and 552 seats for passengers, 92 of which have complimentary charging outlets. The newly constructed area was designed to accommodate up to nearly 1,900 passengers and 12 flights during peak operations. The expansion involved the renovation of both the second international/domestic arrivals hall, the Red Dot Design Museum, and portions of former Terminal 2. The interior design incorporates distinctive elements of traditional Minnan architecture.

=== Terminal 4 ===
Terminal 4 was located on Nanba Road (南八路), 3 kilometers (1.9 mi) east of Terminal 3. It was officially opened on 28 December 2014 to alleviate 50% of passenger traffic from Terminal 3, as it had been operating at more than 100% of its capacity. It was designed as Gaoqi's transitional terminal, built to ensure continued normal operations until the Xiamen Xiang'an International Airport was completed. It was designed to handle 10 million passengers annually.

It only serves domestic flights for air carriers except XiamenAir, China Southern Airlines, and Hebei Airlines; if a flight was booked for any of the three air carriers or international carriers, passengers will be departing via Terminal 3. Otherwise, they will go to Terminal 4. The arrivals and departures halls were designed to be separate from each other; the arrivals hall is located on the first floor, while the departures hall is located on the second floor.

== Airlines and destinations ==
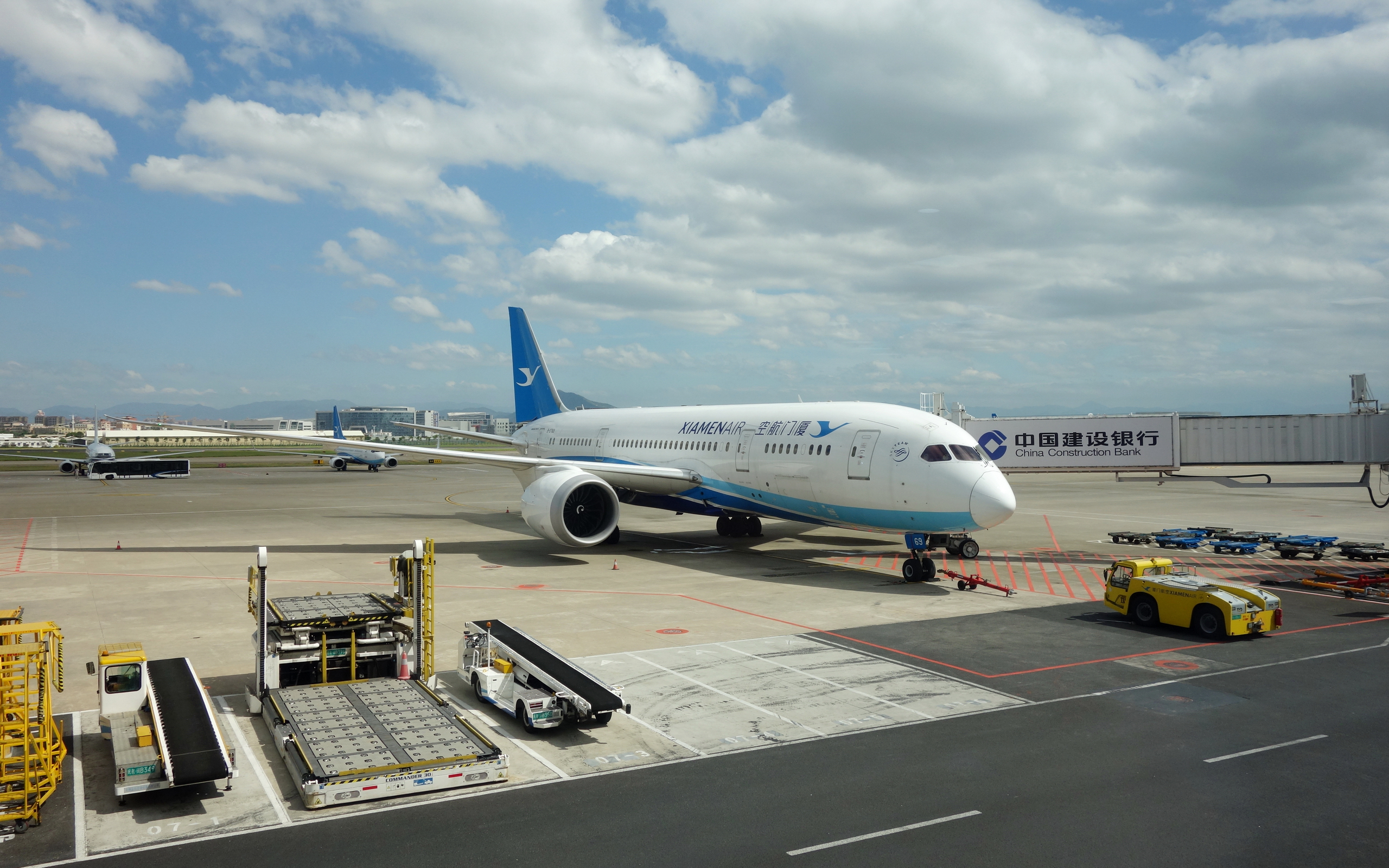
A Boeing 787 of XiamenAir at the Xiamen Gaoqi International Airport

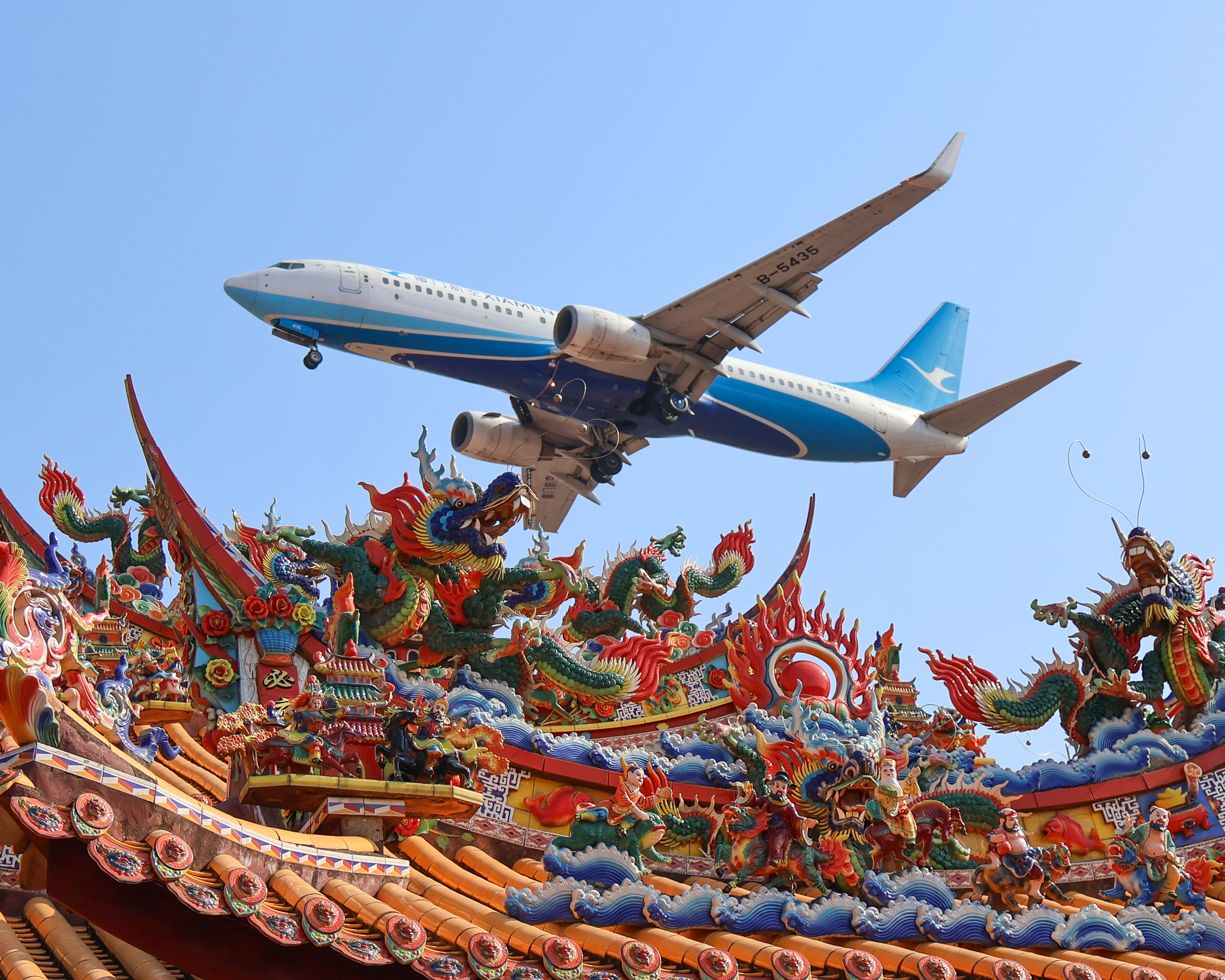
A XiamenAir Boeing 737-800 approaching Xiamen, seen above the Qingshui Temple of the Gaodian Community.

=== Passenger ===
In 2025, the airport set a new record for annual passenger throughput for a single-runway airport in China, with 29,193,712 passengers. The airport handled 3.4 million international passengers in 2025, ranking sixth in the country.

Airlines	Destinations
Aero Dili	Dili
Air Chang'an	Ezhou, Tongren, Xi'an, Xinyang
Batik Air Malaysia	Kuala Lumpur–International
Beijing Capital Airlines	Lijiang, Shenyang
Cathay Pacific	Hong Kong
Cebu Pacific	Manila (resumes 23 November 2026)
Chengdu Airlines	Chengdu—Shuangliu
China Eastern Airlines	Chengdu–Tianfu, Lanzhou, Shanghai–Pudong, Yantai, Yulin (Shaanxi), Zhengzhou, Zhoushan
China Express Airlines	Xi'an, Xiangyang
China Southern Airlines	Nanning
China United Airlines	Shijiazhuang
Chongqing Airlines	Changsha, Chongqing
Dalian Airlines	Beijing–Capital
Eastar Jet	Busan, Seoul–Incheon
Fuzhou Airlines	Hami, Harbin, Longnan, Xining, Zhengzhou, Zhoushan
Hebei Airlines	Hohhot
Jiangxi Air	Zhengzhou
Korean Air	Seoul–Incheon
Lucky Air	Chengdu–Tianfu
Malaysia Airlines	Kuala Lumpur–International
Shandong Airlines	Changzhou, Chengdu–Tianfu, Guilin, Haikou, Jakarta–Soekarno-Hatta, Shiyan, Wuyishan, Xuzhou, Zhengzhou
Shenzhen Airlines	Shenyang
Singapore Airlines	Singapore
Spring Airlines	Osaka–Kansai
Sky Angkor Airlines	Sihanoukville
Thai Airways International	Bangkok–Suvarnabhumi
Tianjin Airlines	Ankang, Bozhou, Chizhou, Dalian, Haikou, Tianjin, Ürümqi, Weihai, Xi'an, Yichang, Yueyang, Yulin (Shaanxi), Zunyi–Xinzhou
West Air	Zhengzhou
XiamenAir	Addis Ababa (begins 28 November 2026), Doha, Fuzhou, Huai'an, Jiayuguan, Jingzhou, Kota Kinabalu, Malé, Nanning, Penang, Phnom Penh, Tokyo–Narita, Wenzhou, Xishuangbanna, Zhuhai, Zunyi–Maotai; Seasonal: London–Heathrow

=== Cargo ===
Airlines	Destinations
Ethiopian Cargo	São Paulo–Guarulhos
MSC Air Cargo	Anchorage, Seoul–Incheon
SDA Cargo	Cebu
Tianjin Air Cargo	Davao

== See also ==
- List of airports in China
- List of the busiest airports in China
