= Gaoji Causeway =

Causeway in Xiamen, China

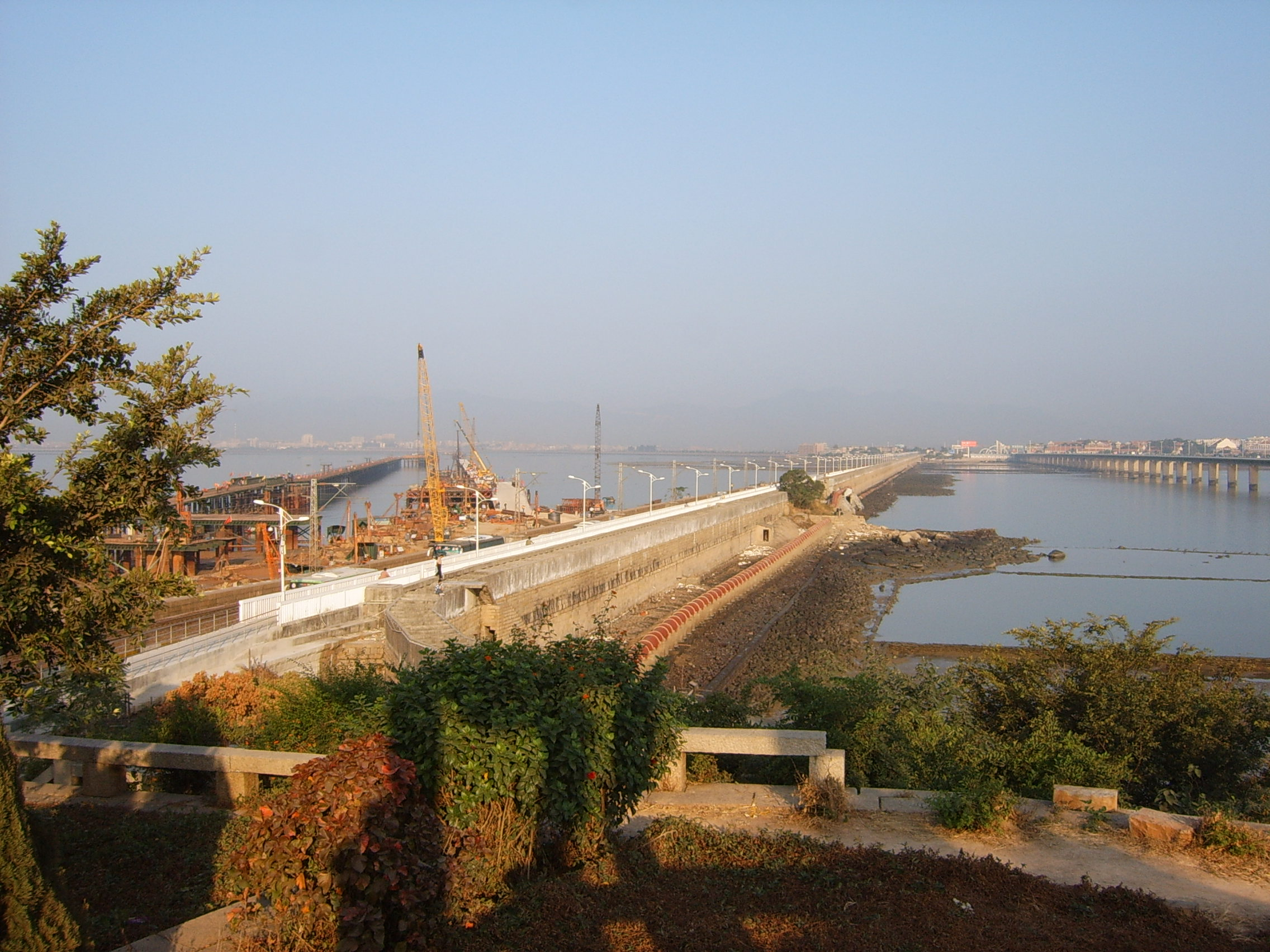
Gaoji Causeway in 2006

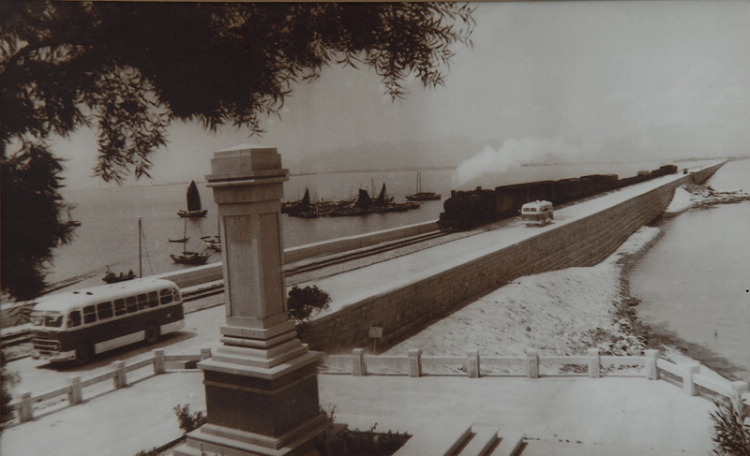
The brand new Gaoji Causeway in 1957

Gaoji Causeway (Chinese: 高集海堤; pinyin: Gāojí Hǎidī) is a 2,212-meter-long causeway in Xiamen, Fujian, China. It links Gaoqi in downtown Xiamen Island across the Xiamen Bay to Jimei District on the mainland. It used to serve as a road and rail link, as well as water piping into Xiamen Island. In order to improve the water quality around Xiamen Island, part of the causeway was blasted off and removed, replaced by bridge, and it would serve only as road link. Completed in 1955, along with Wuhan Yangtze River Bridge, the causeway is considered one of the major construction projects in the early years of the People's Republic of China. It remained Xiamen Island's sole link with the mainland until 1991. The Gaoji Causeway has a museum devoted to its construction and history founded in 2013.

== History ==
In the early 1950s, Xiamen was on the front line of Cold War, as the island was not far away from KMT controlled Kinmen. The Chinese Communist Party had an urgent need to build a reliable supply line to the island. In 1951, inspired by the Johor–Singapore Causeway, Tan Kah Kee from Singapore suggested to Xiamen Mayor Liang Lingguang (梁灵光) that a similar causeway be built to link Xiamen Island and the mainland. The suggestion was highly regarded by Chen Yi, then the Party Secretary of the CPC Central Committee East China Bureau, who wrote three letters to Mao Zedong in support of the causeway. Mao personally approved the project. Construction began in 1953, and the building site was frequently attacked by KMT aircraft. In January 1955, a boat loaded with workers was attacked with a loss of 76 lives. Due to the lack of heavy equipment, all work was done by human labor. After its completion in October 1955, a stele was erected by the causeway with the words "Move the mountain to fill the sea" (移山填海) written by Zhu De in honour of the achievement. On April 12, 1957, the first passenger train left the Xiamen Railway Station, heading to the mainland along the causeway, which marked the opening of the Yingtan–Xiamen Railway. Before the completion of Xiamen Bridge in 1991, the causeway was the Xiamen Island's sole link with mainland for over thirty years. However, the embankment cut off the flow of water in the bay, which endangered the ecosystem and the survival of many species, including lancelet. In order to protect the environment, part of the embankment was blast off in 2010, and a road bridge would be built instead.

== Brands ==
The brands of many products made by local state-owned companies are "Sea Dyke" (海堤, pinyin: Hǎidì; Peh-ōe-ji: Hái-thê), including tea, cigarettes and soy sauce, refer to the causeway.
