= Xiamen Island =

Island in Fujian, China

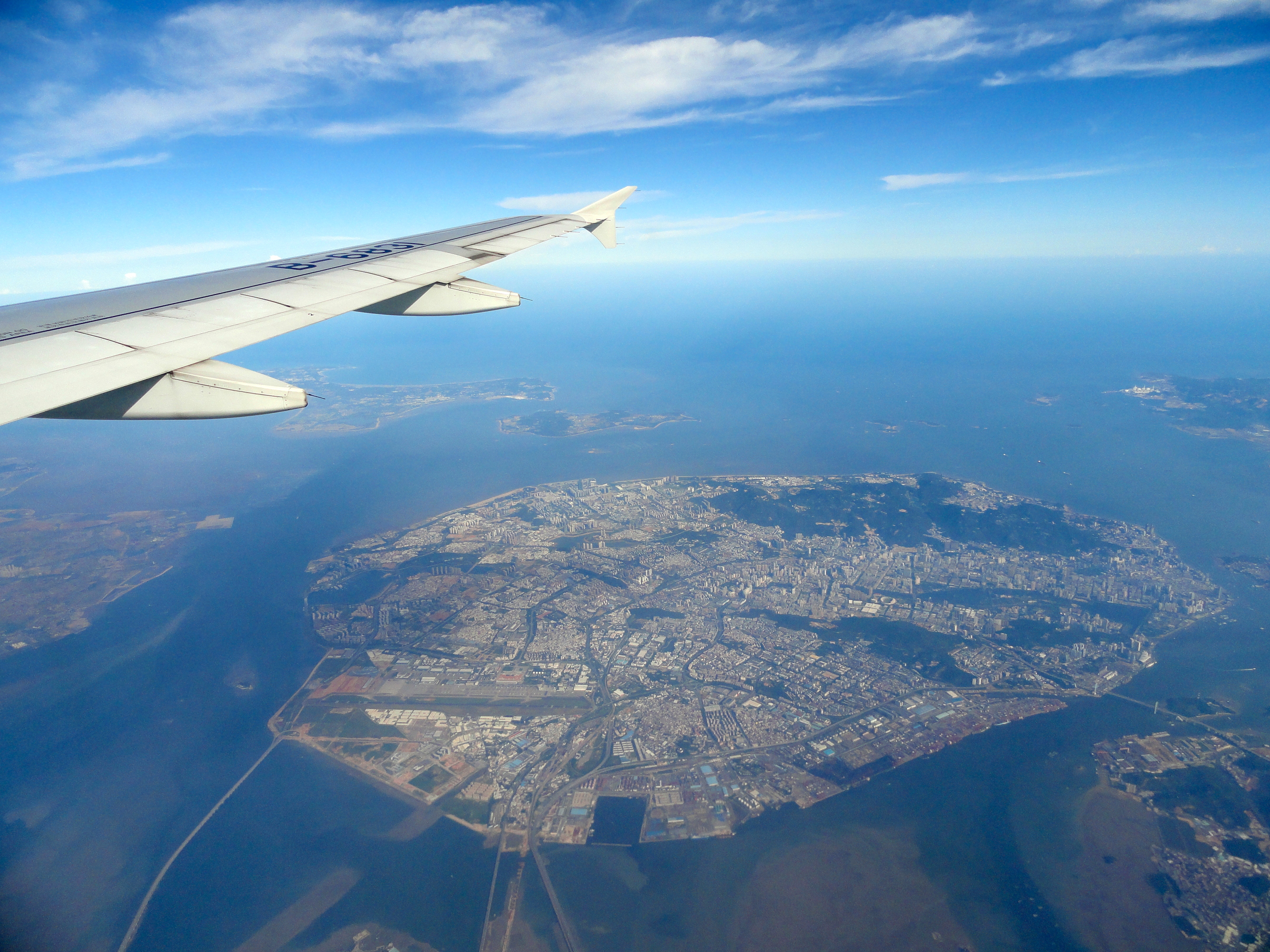
- Xiamen Island, looking south

- Location within Fujian

Geography
- Location: Taiwan Strait
- Coordinates: 24°29′36″N 118°08′11″E
- Area: 155.89 km^{2} (60.19 sq mi)

Administration
- China
- Province: Fujian
- City: Xiamen
- District: Huli and Siming

Demographics
- Population: 1,847,047 (2016)
- Pop. density: 11,848.4/km^{2} (30687.2/sq mi)

Xiamen Island
- Simplified Chinese: 厦门岛
- Traditional Chinese: 廈門島
Transcriptions
Standard Mandarin
- Hanyu Pinyin: Xiàmén dǎo
- Bopomofo: ㄒㄧㄚˋ ㄇㄣˊ ㄉㄠˇ

Xiamen Island (simplified Chinese: 厦门岛; traditional Chinese: 廈門島; pinyin: Xiàmén dǎo), alternately known as Amoy Island from its Hokkien pronunciation, is an island in southeastern Fujian, China, on the Taiwan Strait. It is administered by the People's Republic of China as the Huli and Siming urban districts of the sub-provincial city of Xiamen. The Gaoji Causeway is to the north, the old Yundang Harbor (now an enclosed lake) is to the west. The Kinmen Islands, controlled by the Republic of China, are to the southeast. It has an area of 155.89 square kilometers (60.19 sq mi). With a population of 1,847,047 people, it forms the core of the city's special economic zone.

== See also ==
- List of islands of China
- Xiamen
