= Xiamen =

City in Fujian, China

Xiamen 厦门市 Amoy
- Prefecture-level and Sub-provincial city
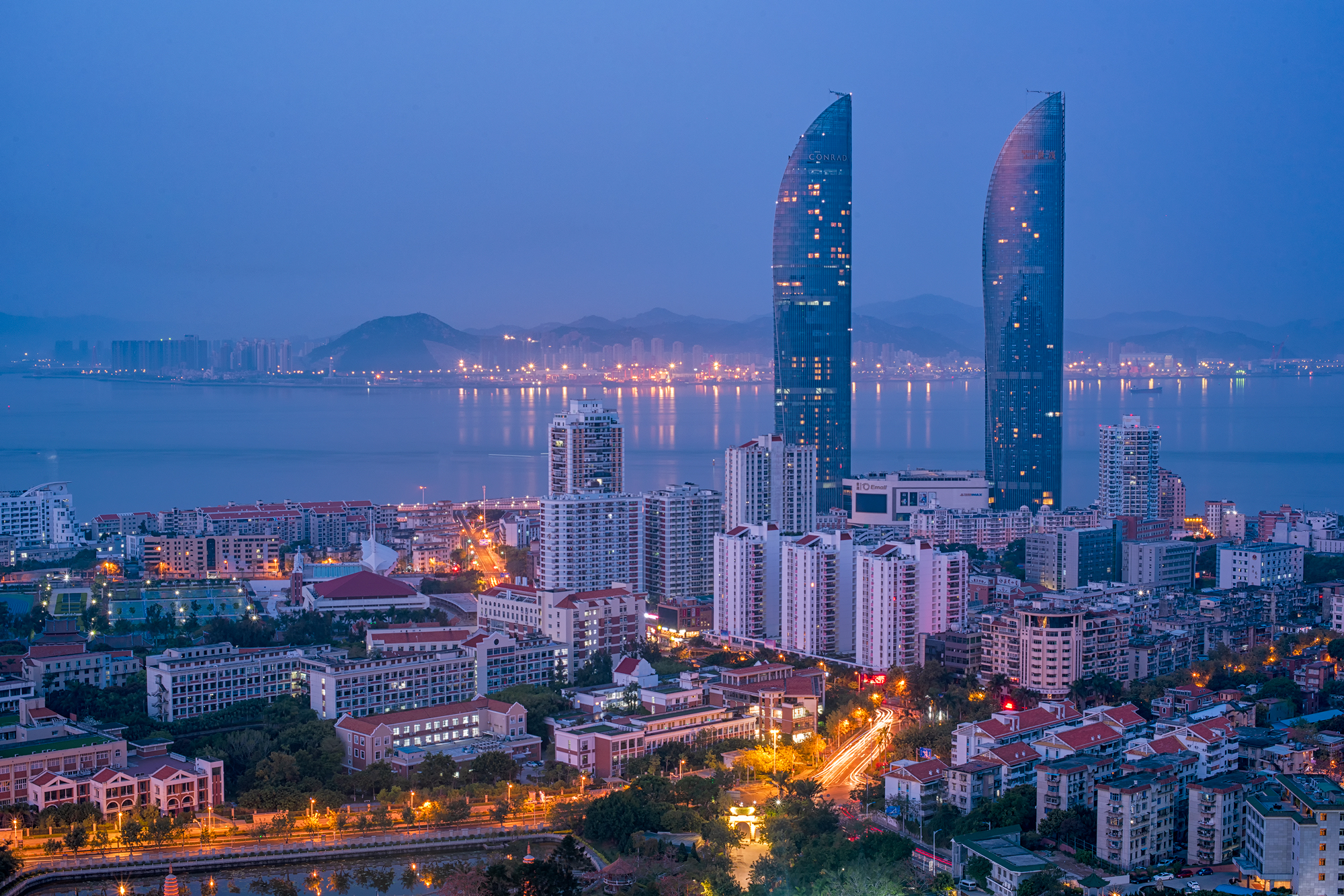
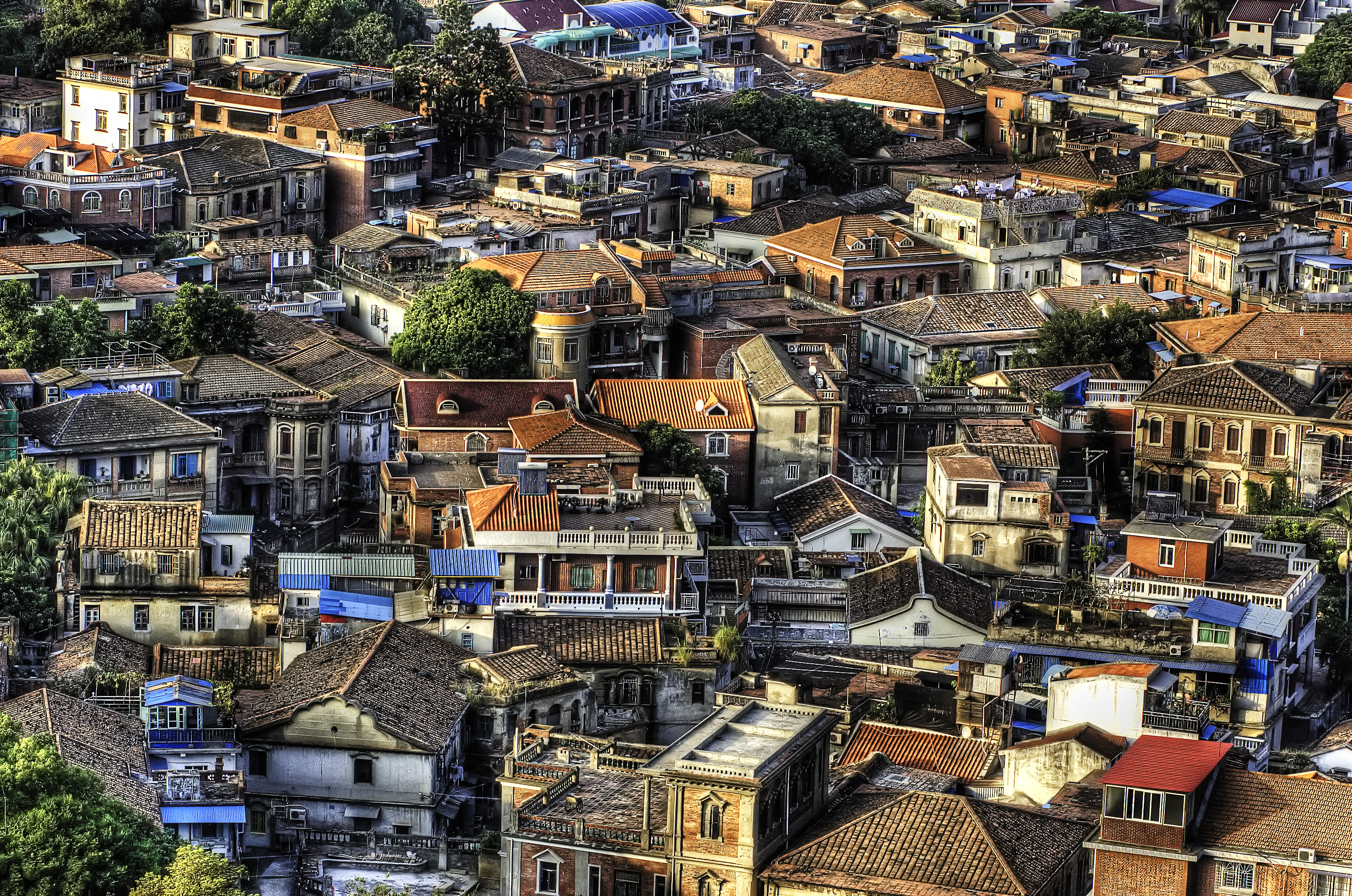
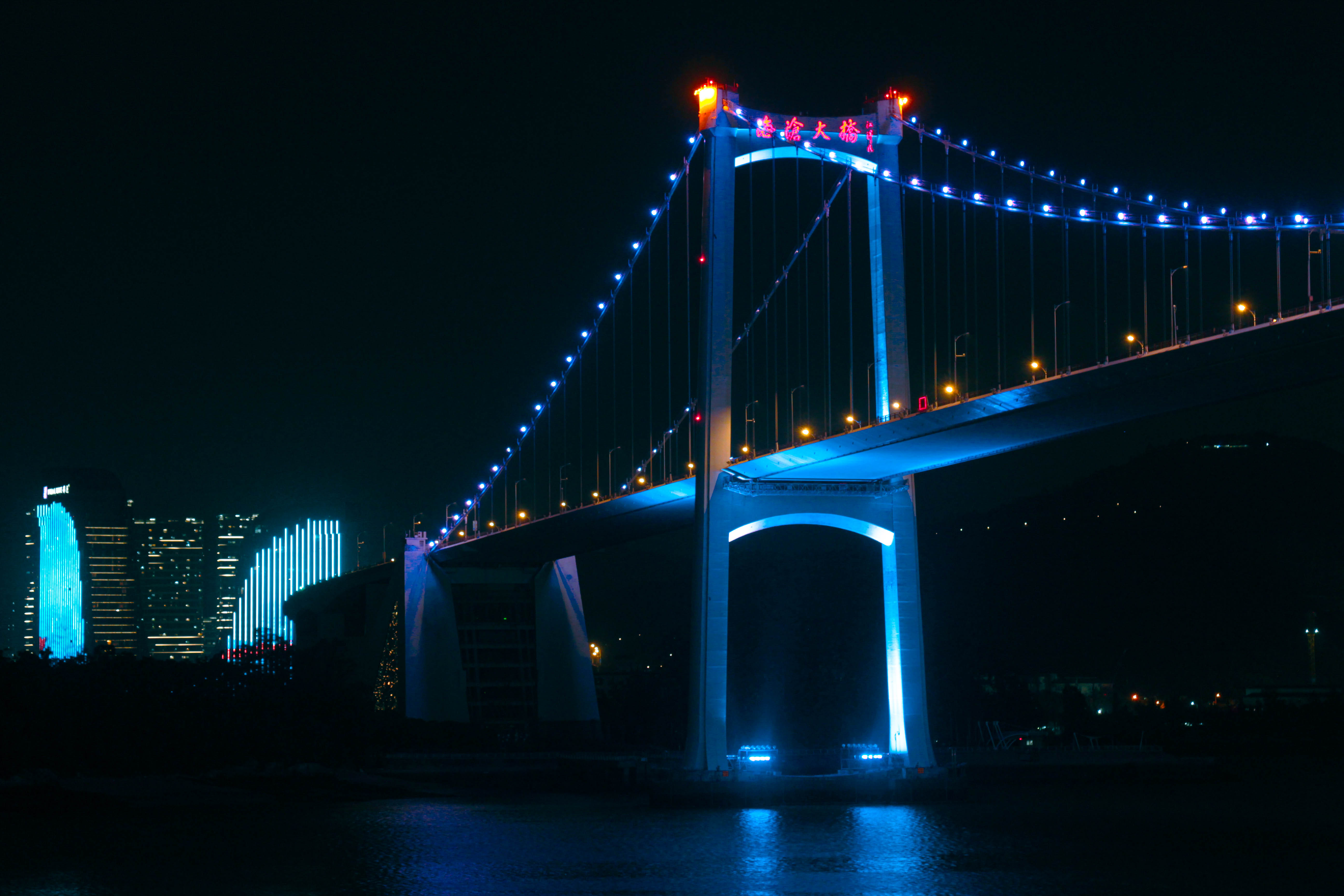
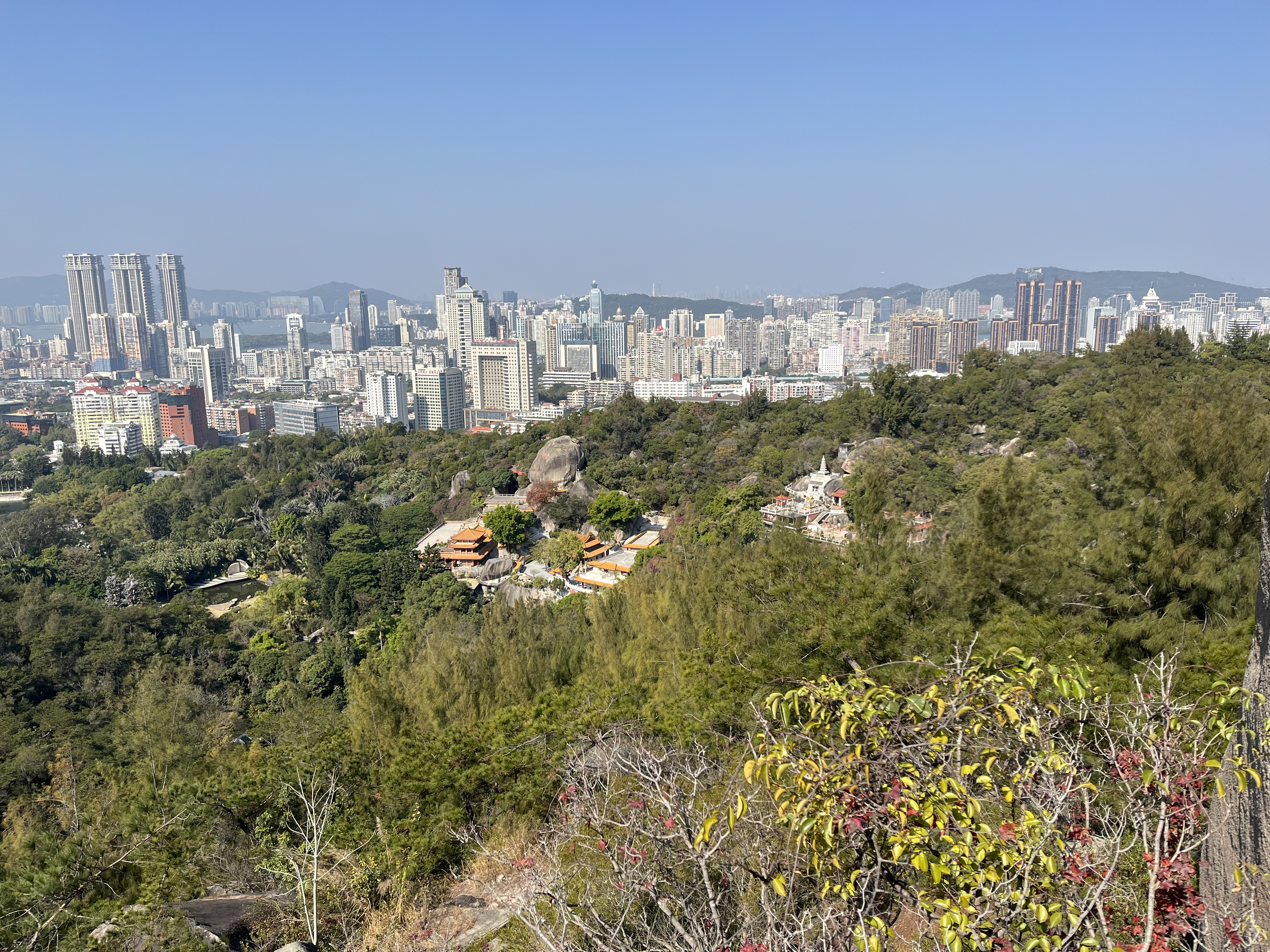
- Shimao Cross-Strait Plaza and Xiamen University Xiamen Eastern Coast CBD Gulangyu South Putuo Temple Wuyuan Bay Haicang Bridge Xiamen Botanical Gardens Xiamen Old Town

- Location of Xiamen City jurisdiction in Fujian

- Location in China
- Coordinates (Xiamen municipal government): 24°28′47″N 118°05′20″E
- Country: China
- Province: Fujian
- Establishment of: Tongan country: 282
- Ancient Xiamen City: 1394
- Municipality: 1 December 1933
- Municipal seat: Siming District
- Divisions: County-level; Township-level: 6 districts; 37 subdistricts and 8 towns

Government
  - Type: Sub-provincial city
  - CCP Secretary: Lin Tao (林涛)
  - Mayor(acting): Yan Jianbo (闫剑波)

Area
  - City: 1,700.61 km^{2} (656.61 sq mi)
  - Urban: 1,700.61 km^{2} (656.61 sq mi)

Population (2020 census)
  - City: 5,163,970
  - Density: 3,036.54/km^{2} (7,864.60/sq mi)
  - Urban: 3,866,555
  - Urban density: 2,273.63/km^{2} (5,888.67/sq mi)
  - Metro: 5,163,970
  - Major nationalities: Han: 96.13%; Other ethnic groups: 3.87%

GDP
  - Prefecture-level and Sub-provincial city(2025): RMB 898.037 billion USD 125.724 billion
  - Per capita(2025): RMB 167,622; USD 23,467
- Time zone: UTC+8 (CST)
- Postal code: 361000
- Area code: 592
- ISO 3166 code: CN-FJ-02
- License plate prefixes: 闽D
- Language: Mandarin (official); Hokkien (Amoy dialect)
- Website: xm.gov.cn

Xiamen
- "Xiamen" in Simplified (top) and Traditional (bottom) Chinese characters
- Simplified Chinese: 厦门
- Traditional Chinese: 廈門
- Hokkien POJ: Ē-mn̂g or Ē͘-mûi
- Postal: Amoy
- Literal meaning: "Mansion Gate" (Note: Formerly "Lower Gate" (下門); see Name section.)
Transcriptions
Standard Mandarin
- Hanyu Pinyin: Xiàmén
- Bopomofo: ㄒㄧㄚˋ ㄇㄣˊ
- Gwoyeu Romatzyh: Shiahmen
- Wade–Giles: Hsia^{4}-mên^{2}
- Tongyong Pinyin: Siàmén
- Yale Romanization: Syàmén
- IPA: [ɕjâ.mə̌n]
Gan
- Romanization: Ha^{5}-mun^{4}
Hakka
- Romanization: Hà-mûn
Yue: Cantonese
- Yale Romanization: Hah-mùhn
- Jyutping: Haa6mun4
- IPA: [ha˨ mun˩]
Southern Min
- Hokkien POJ: Ē-mn̂g or Ē͘-mûi
- Tâi-lô: Ē-mn̂g or Ēe-muî
Eastern Min
- Fuzhou BUC: Â-muòng

Xiamen, (Note: UK: /ʃ(j)ɑːˈmɛn/ sh(y)ah-MEN, US: /-ˈmʌn/ -MUN; Chinese: 厦门; pinyin: Xiàmén; formerly romanized as Hsiamen) historically romanized as Amoy, (Note: /əˈmɔɪ/ ə-MOY; from the Zhangzhou Hokkien pronunciation, Pe̍h-ōe-jī: Ē͘-mûi, IPA: [ɛ˨˩ muĩ˩˧]) is a sub-provincial city in southeastern Fujian, People's Republic of China, beside the Taiwan Strait. It is divided into six districts: Huli, Siming, Jimei, Tong'an, Haicang, and Xiang'an. All together, these cover an area of 1,700.61 square kilometers (656.61 sq mi) with a population of 5,163,970 as of 2020 and estimated at 5.365 million as of 31 December 2025. The urbanized area of the city has spread from its original island to include most parts of all six of its districts, as well as 4 Zhangzhou districts (Xiangcheng, Longwen, Longhai and Changtai), which form a built-up area of 7,284,148 inhabitants. This area also connects with Quanzhou in the north, making up a metropolis of nearly ten million people. The Kinmen Islands (Quemoy) administered by the Republic of China (Taiwan) lie less than 6 kilometers (4 mi) away separated by Xiamen Bay. As part of the Opening Up Policy under Deng Xiaoping, Xiamen became one of China's original four special economic zones opened to foreign investment and trade in the early 1980s.

Xiamen Island possesses a major international seaport. The Port of Xiamen is a well-developed first-class trunk line port in the Asia-Pacific region. It is ranked the 7th-largest container port in China and ranks 15th in the world. It is the 4th port in China with the capacity to handle 6th-generation large container ships. On 31 August 2010, Xiamen Port incorporated the neighboring port of Zhangzhou to form the largest port of China's Southeast. Ever since the 12th century, Xiamen was also an important origin for many migrants to Singapore, Malaysia, Indonesia and the Philippines. The overseas Chinese used to support Xiamen's educational and cultural institutions.

Xiamen is one of the top 40 cities in the world by scientific research as tracked by the Nature Index. The city is home to several major universities, including Xiamen University, one of China's most prestigious universities as a member of the Double First Class Universities, Huaqiao, Jimei, Xiamen University of Technology and Xiamen Medical College.

== Name ==
Xiamen Island was described as Jiahe Islet of Tong'an County during the Song dynasty. It received its present name from the Xiamen Defense Castle erected on the island by Zhou Dexing in 1387 during the Ming dynasty to meet the needs of coastal defense. The name was formerly written using, Chinese: 下門; lit. 'Lower Gate', and then changed into Chinese: 廈門; lit. 'Mansion Gate' or "Gate of China".

After the fall of the Ming dynasty, Koxinga, a Ming loyalist and general, occupied Xiamen island as an anti-Qing base. In 1650, the seventh year of Emperor Shunzhi of the Qing dynasty, Zheng set a military base in Xiamen island and changed its name into Chinese: 思明州; pinyin: Sīmíng zhōu; Pe̍h-ōe-jī: Su-bêng chiu; lit. 'Think Ming (dynasty) Prefecture', meaning "Remembering the Ming".

When its port prospered under the Qing, especially during the reign of Emperor Kangxi, the island's name was changed to Chinese: 廈門; pinyin: Xiàmén; Pe̍h-ōe-jī: Ē-mn̂g / Ē͘-mûi; Tâi-lô: Ē-mn̂g again.

The island's name of 思明 was in return restored after the Xinhai Revolution that inaugurated the republic in 1912.

The island's name of 廈門 was restored in 1933, along with Xiamen being administratively planned as a city, the first of its kind in Fujian province. 思明 continues to be used as the name of one of its districts.

Xiamen is the atonal pinyin romanization of the characters' pronunciation in Mandarin. It has also been romanized as Hiamen. The older English name "Amoy" was based on the same name's pronunciation in the Zhangzhou dialect of Hokkien, Ē͘-mûi.

== History ==
The area of Xiamen was largely bypassed by the Qin and Han conquests and colonization of Guangdong, which passed west of Fujian down the Lingqu Canal between the Xiang and Li rivers. It was first organized as Tong'an County in AD 282 under the Jin, but it lost this status soon afterwards. Tong'an County was again established in 933 under the Later Tang.

The settlement on the southeastern shore of Xiamen Island (now part of Siming District) developed as a seaport under the Song, although legal foreign trade was restricted to nearby Quanzhou, which administered the area. In 1387, attacks by the "Japanese" or "dwarf" pirates—many of them actually disaffected Chinese—prompted the Ming to protect the harbor with the fortress that gave Xiamen its name. The Portuguese first reached Xiamen in 1541. After the fall of the Ming to the Qing in 1644, Southern Ming loyalists including Koxinga used Xiamen as a base from which to launch attacks against the invading Qing-aligned Han Bannermen from 1650 to 1660. In 1661, Koxinga drove the Dutch from Taiwan and moved his operations there. His base on Xiamen fell to a combined Qing and Dutch invasion in 1663. The East India Company traded extensively with the port, constructing a factory there in 1678. (Note: The factory represented an investment of $30,000 in bullion and $20,000 in goods.) It was raised to the status of a subprefecture in 1680, but the taxes and other restrictions placed on traders compelled the British to relocate to Canton and Fuzhou the next year. Trade resumed in 1685 and continued until the imposition of the Canton System. However, despite the Canton system which restricted Western trade to the port of Guangzhou, the Spanish were still allowed to trade in Xiamen. However, the Spanish rarely used this privilege as Chinese traders would ship their goods from Xiamen to Manila and vice versa, which was more profitable for both sides.

By the 19th century, the city walls had a circumference of around 9 miles (14 km), with an inner and outer city divided by an inner wall and a ridge of hills surmounted by a well-built fort. The inner harbor on Yundang Bay was also well fortified and these defenses were further strengthened upon the outbreak of the First Opium War. Nonetheless, Xiamen was captured in 1841 between Guangzhou and Zhoushan. Rear Adm. Parker bombarded the Qing position to little effect, but the assault by the men under Lt. Gen. Gough caused the Chinese to flee their positions without a fight. The city was abandoned during the night and fell the next day on 27 August. The Chinese had spirited out the entire treasury of sycee bullion under the nose of the British by disguising it inside hollow logs. Xiamen being too large to garrison, a small force was left to hold Gulangyu. The next year, the Treaty of Nanjing made Xiamen one of the first five ports opened to British trade, which had previously been legally restricted to Guangzhou. Subsequent treaties opened the port to other international powers.

As the primary international port for Fujian, particularly Zhangzhou and its hinterland, Xiamen became a center of China's tea trade, with hundreds of thousands of tons shipped yearly to Europe and the Americas. Its local dialect influenced a variety of translations of Chinese terms. Its principal exports during the period were tea, porcelain, and paper; (Note: For 1870, 314 British and 240 other foreign ships cleared the port with £1,144,046 of exports, apart from the domestic traders. This had fallen to £384,494 by 1904.) it imported sugar, rice, cotton, and opium, as well as some manufactured goods. (Note: For 1870, 315 British and 245 other foreign vessels entered the port with £1,915,427 of imports, apart from the domestic traders. For 1904, the figure was £2,081,494.) Xiamen was also a center of Protestant missionaries in China; the missions operated the city's two hospitals. The merchants of Xiamen were thought among the richest and most entrepreneurial and industrious in China, but the city was widely accounted the dirtiest city in China. Owing to local belief in feng shui, the streets were "as crooked as ram's horns" and averaged about 4 feet (1 m) in width to keep out sunlight and control public disturbances. Its population was estimated at 250,000 in the 1870s; (Note: The estimate is very rough. Pitcher, writing a little later, placed the town's population at 60–100,000.) by that point the island was largely barren and full of roughly 140 villages, with a total population around 400,000. European settlement in the port was concentrated on Gulangyu Island off Xiamen proper; it remains known for its colonial architecture.

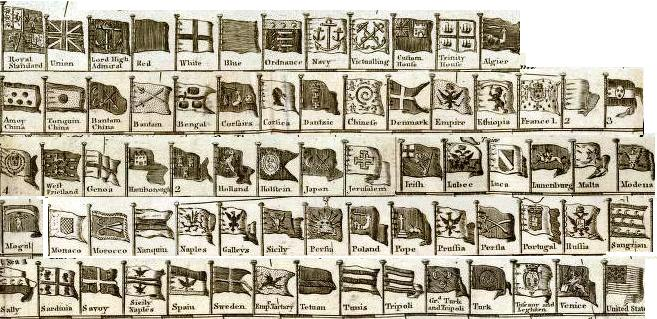
The first flag in the second row was a flag of Amoy as recorded in a map published in 1787

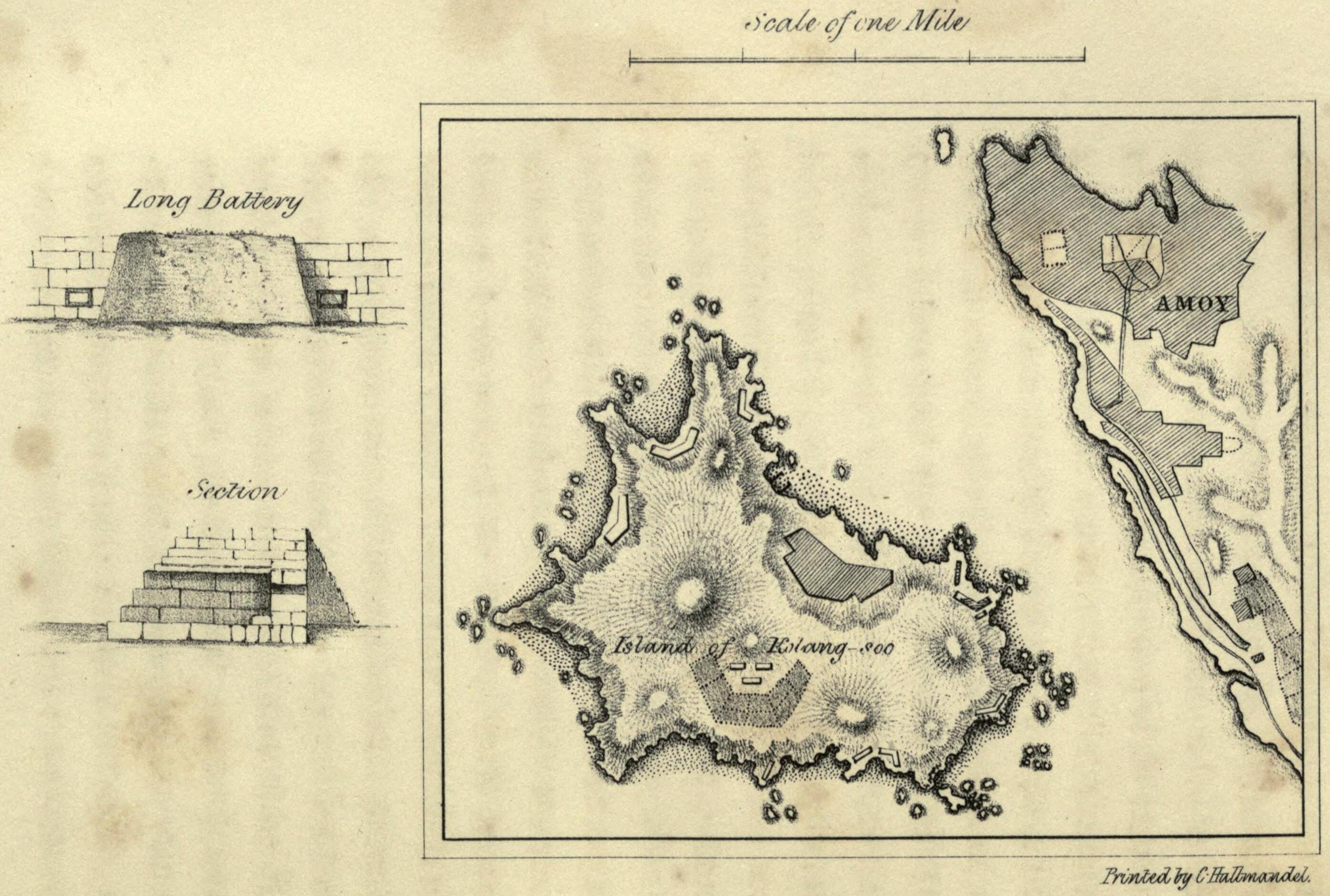
Amoy (Xiamen) and Kolang-soo (Gulangyu) in 1844

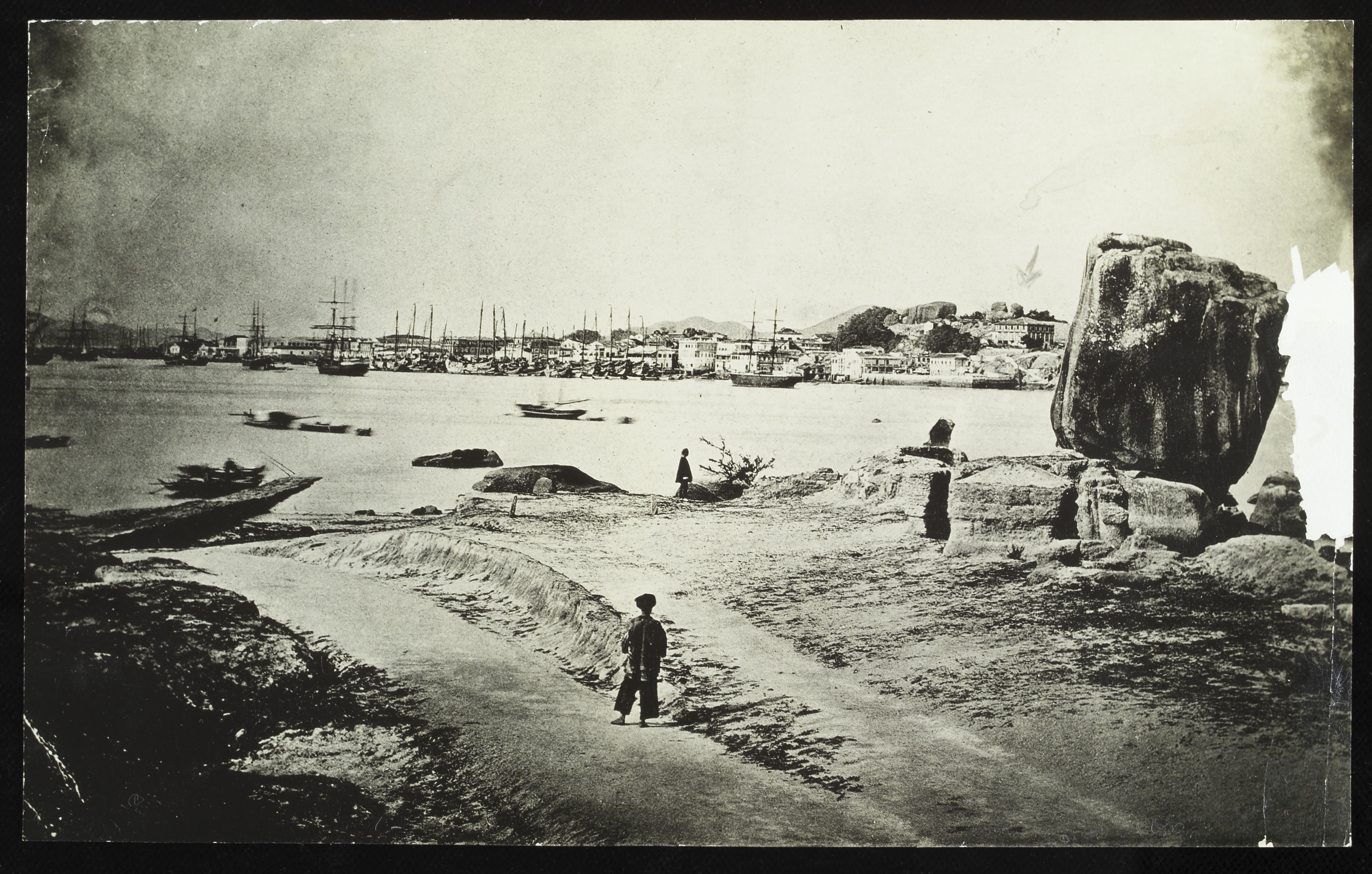
Amoy (Xiamen) Town and Harbor from Kalangsu (Gulangyu) in 1874.

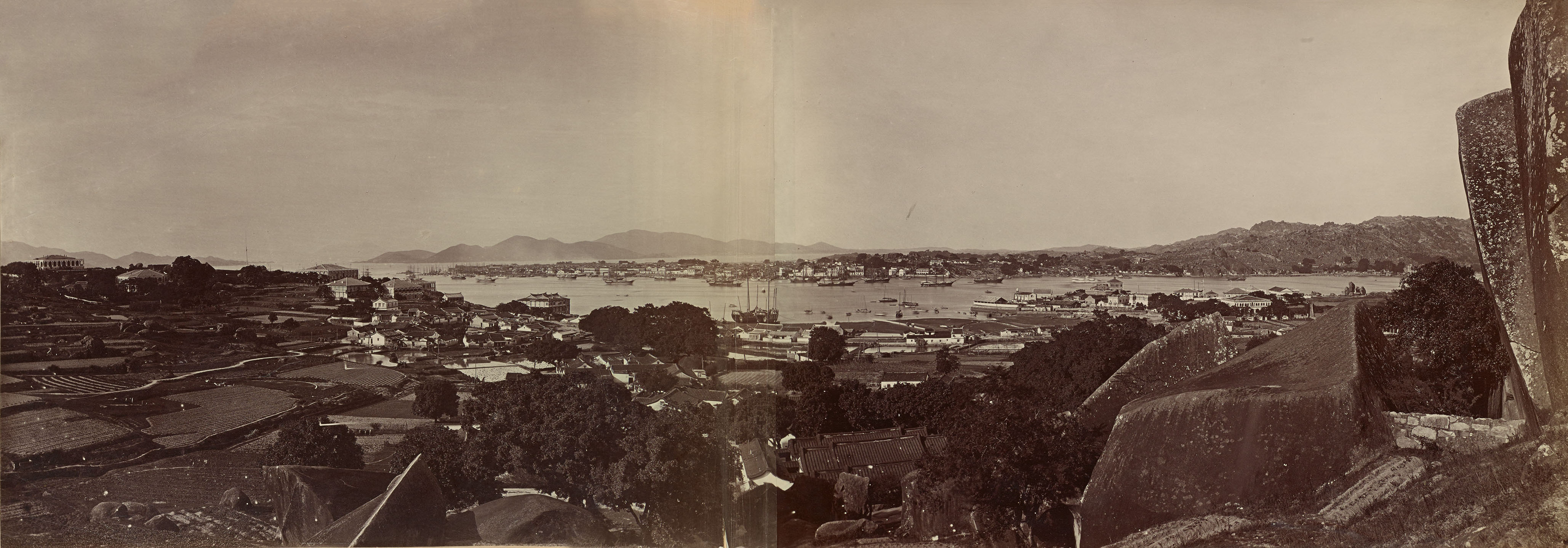
Lai Afong's c. 1870 photograph of Amoy (Xiamen) from Koolansoo (Gulangyu).

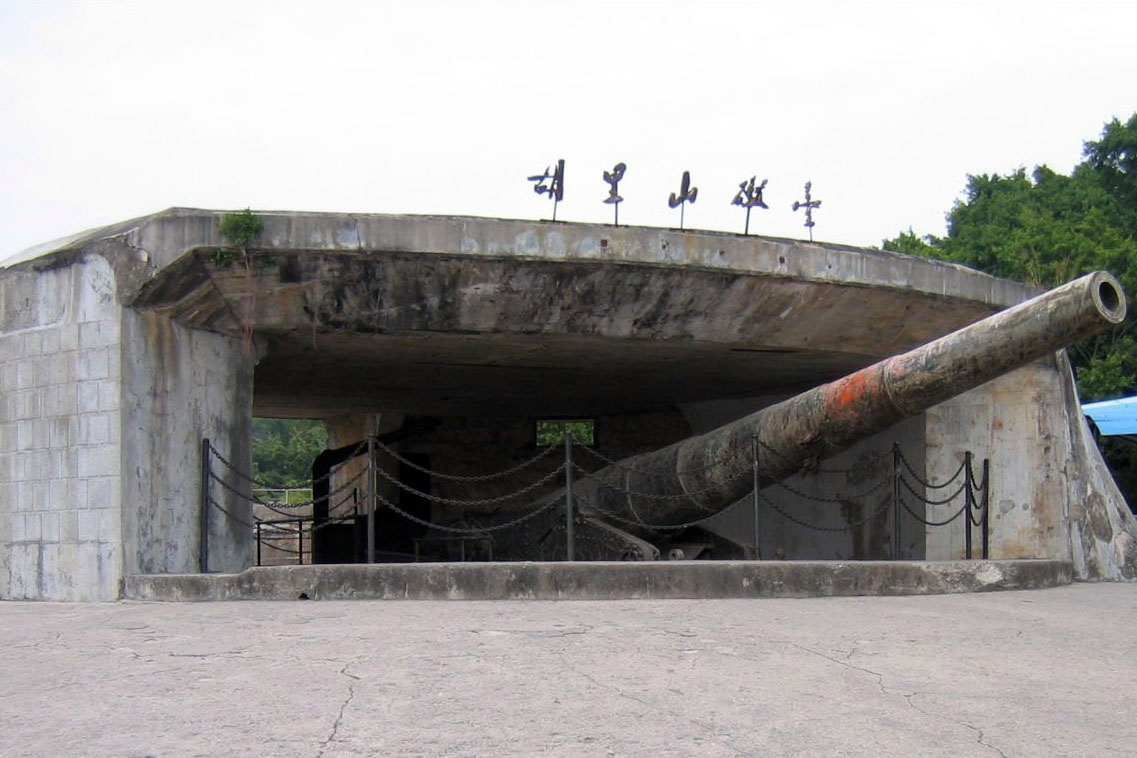
A Krupp gun at the Hulishan Battery, installed to protect Xiamen during the late Qing era.

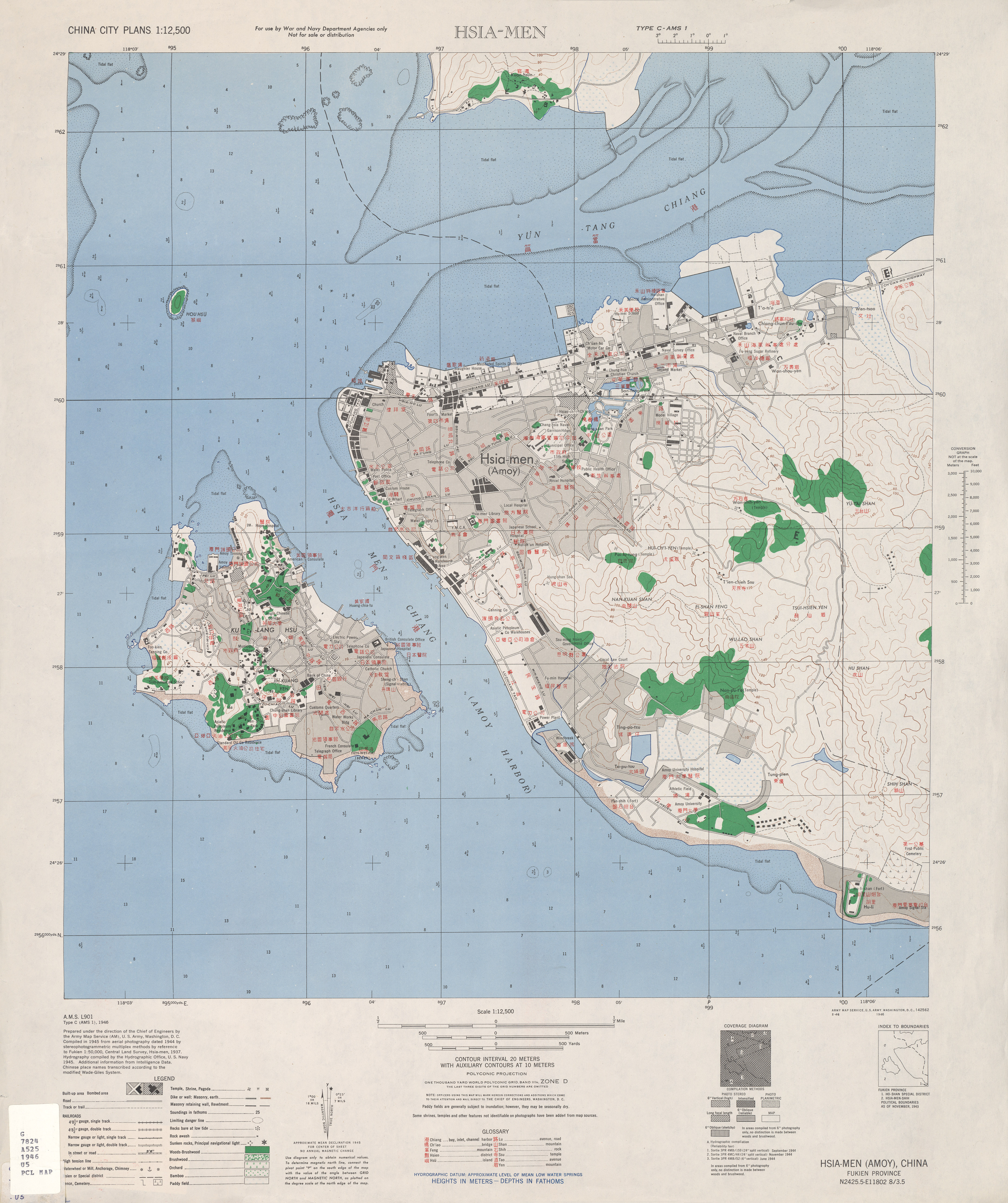
Hsia-men (Xiamen) and Ku-lang Hsü (Gulangyu) in a 1945 American map.

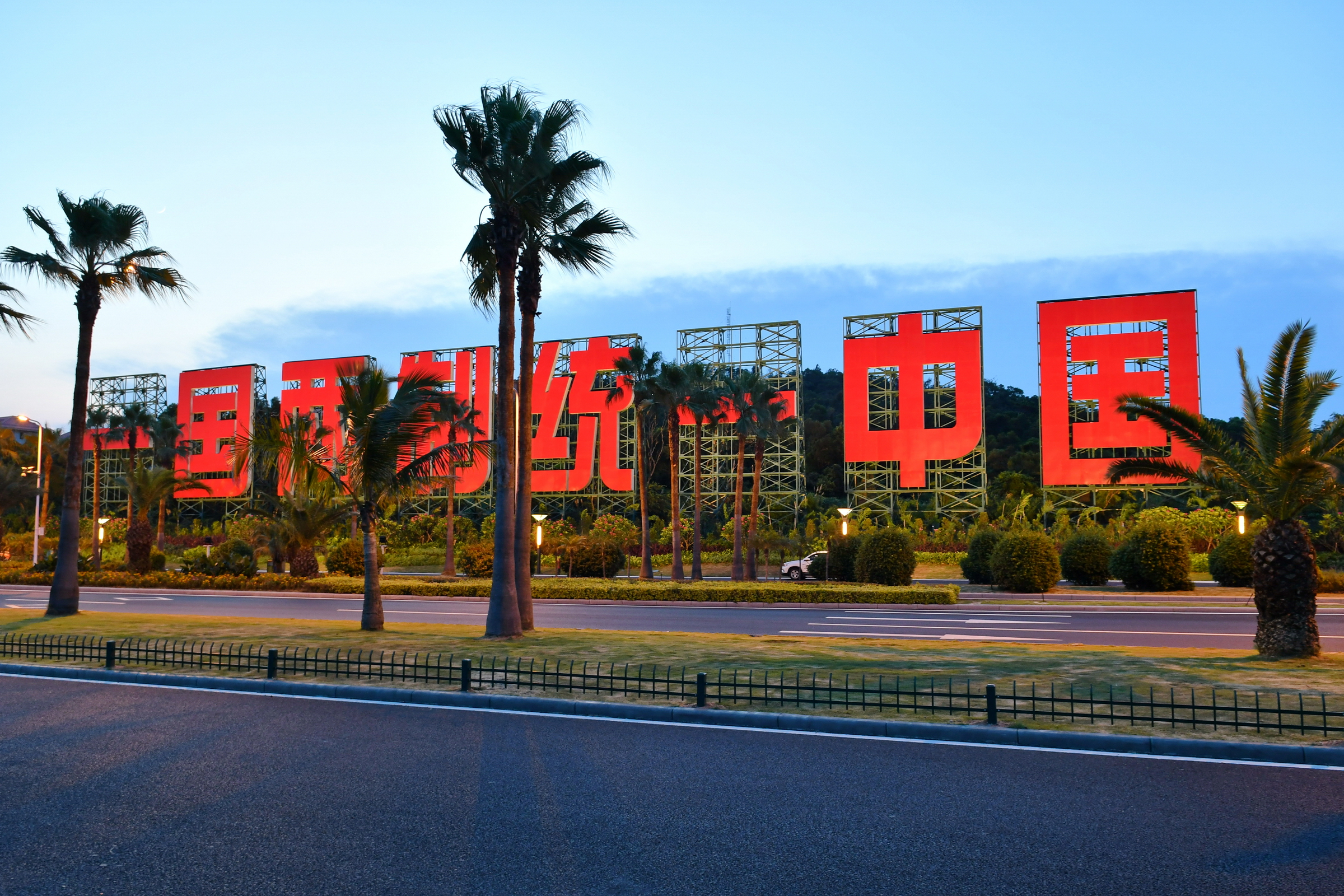
Large characters saying "One Country, Two Systems" and "Reunify China" on Xiamen Island's east coast, facing the nearby Kinmen Islands, Republic of China (Taiwan). Similar propaganda on Kinmen face Xiamen, reading "Three Principles of the People Unite China".

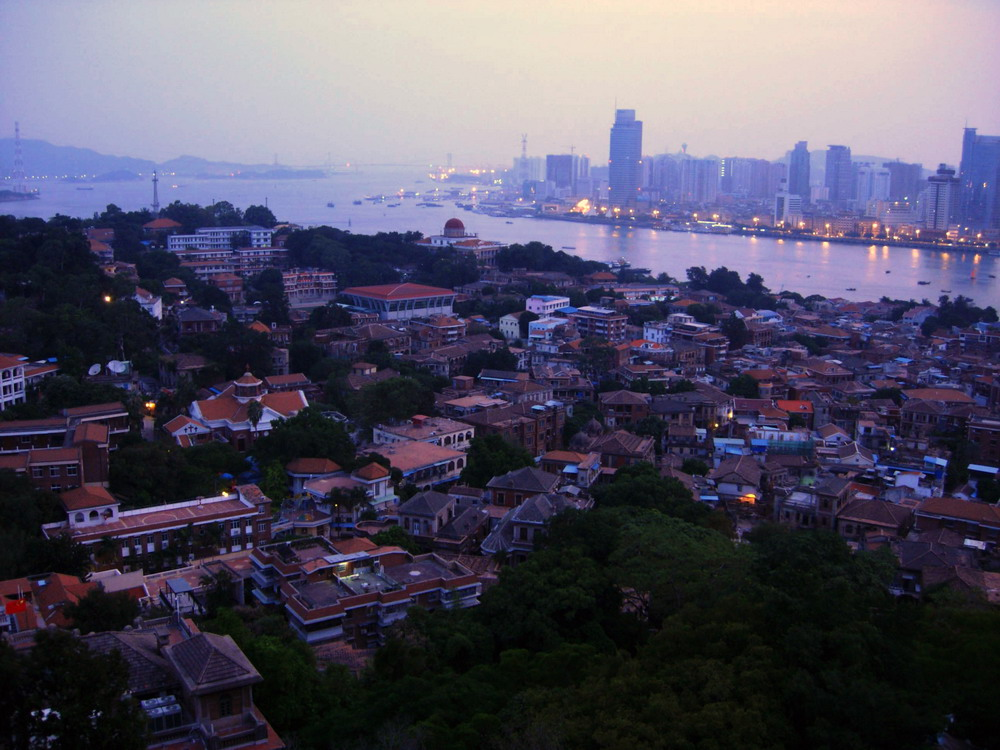
Gulangyu (foreground) and Xiamen (background).

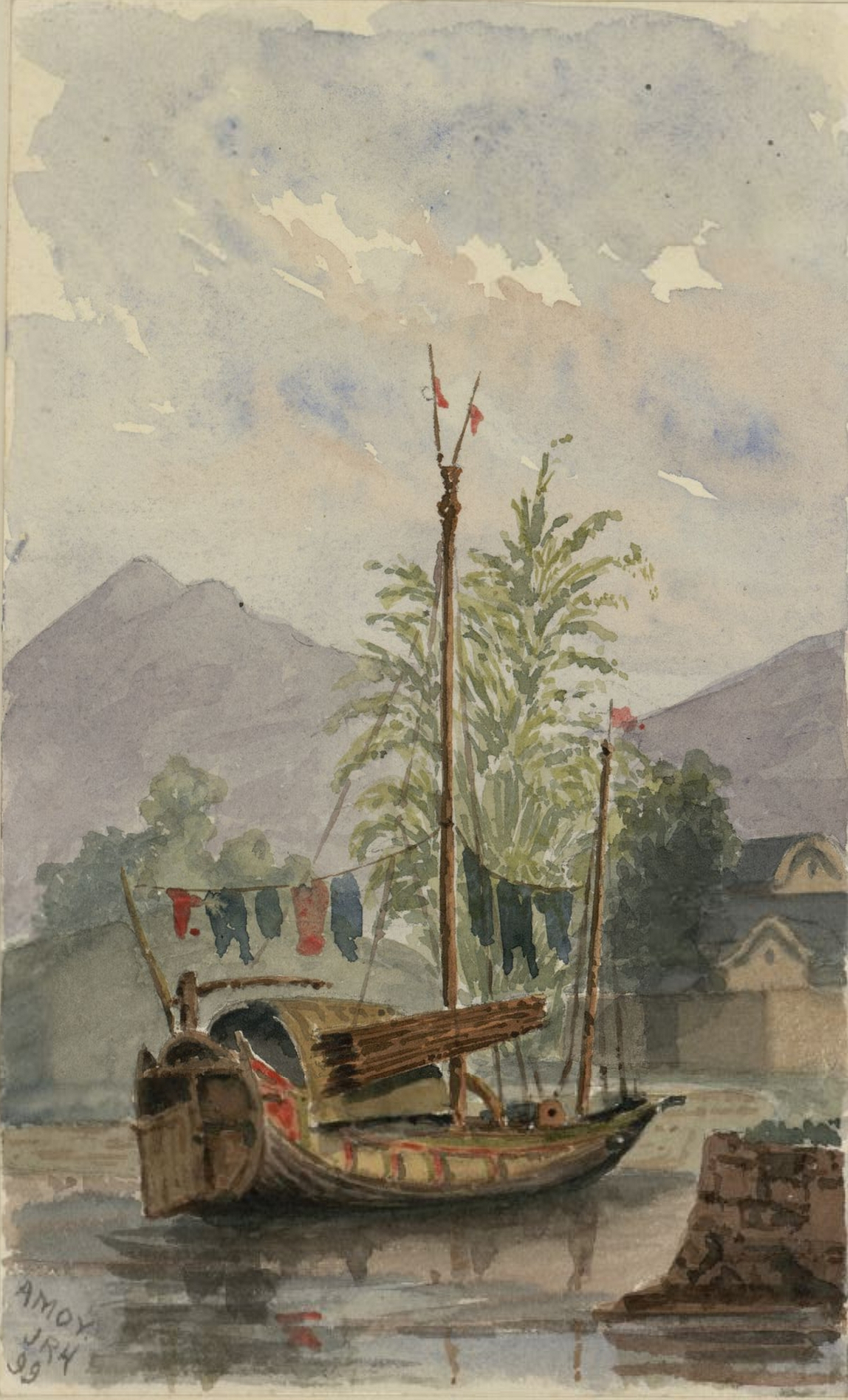
A scene in Amoy painted by a passing traveler in 1899

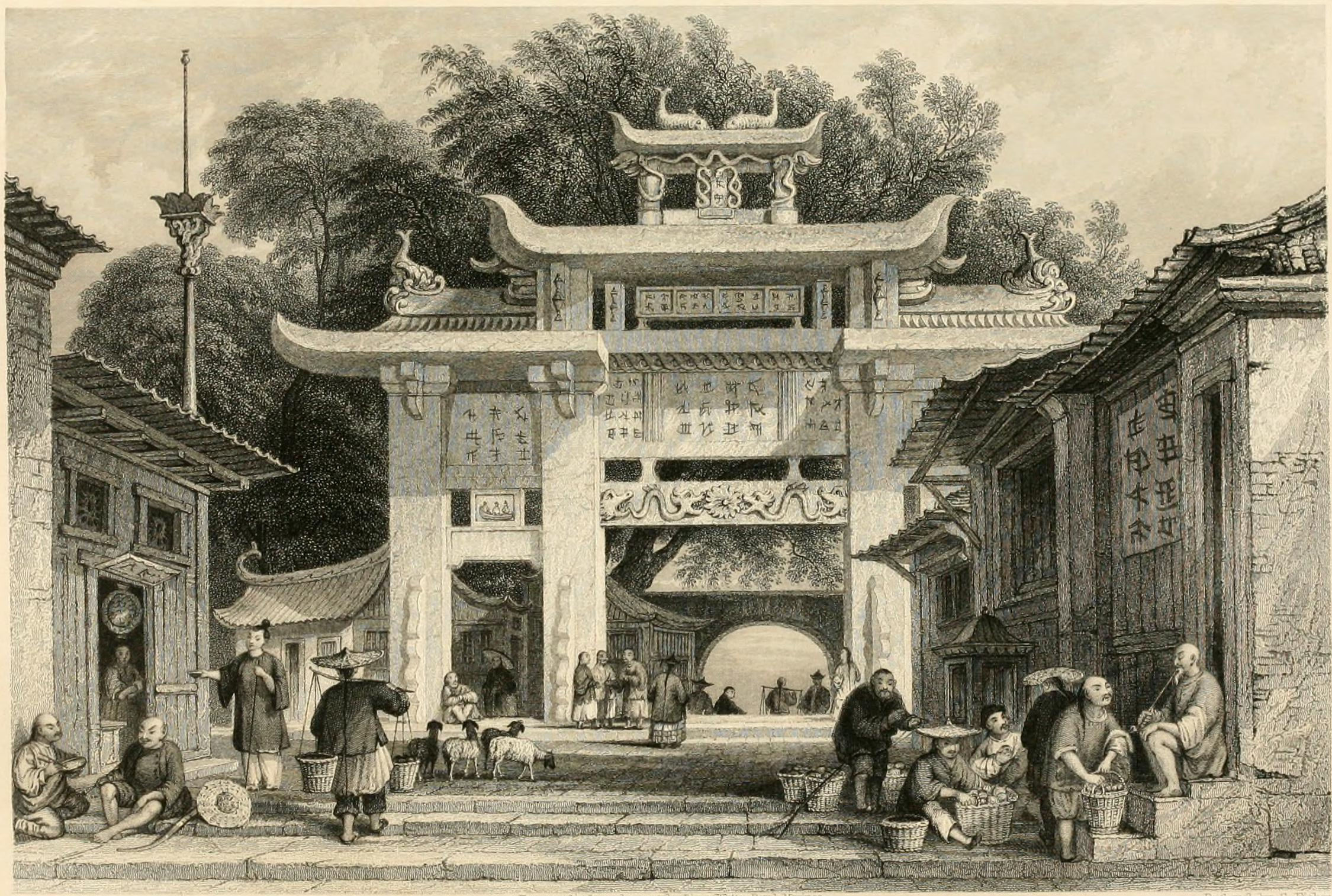
Xiamen's paifang c. 1843

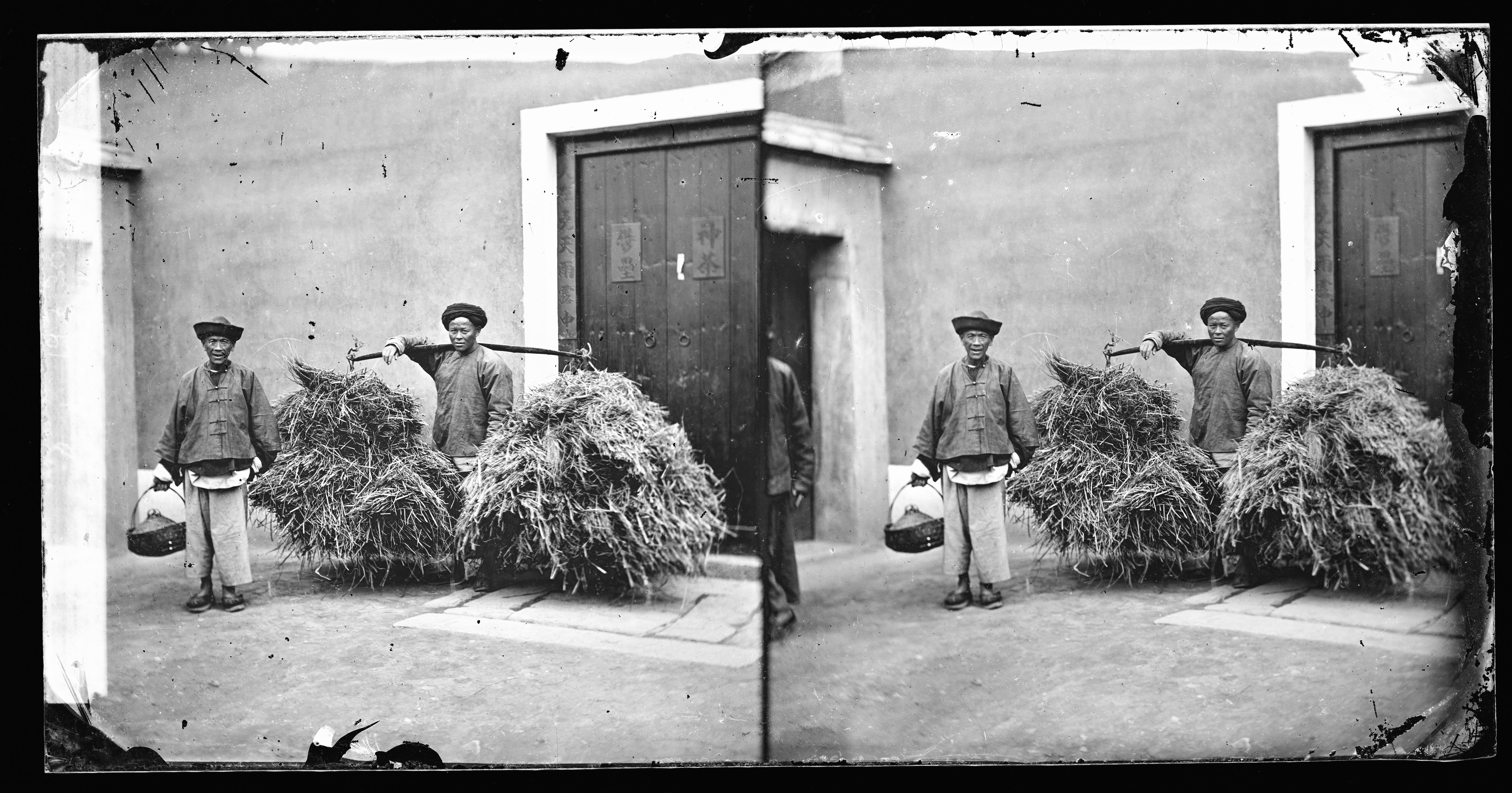
An 1869 stereogram of laborers in Xiamen. The first coolies left Xiamen for Havana in 1847

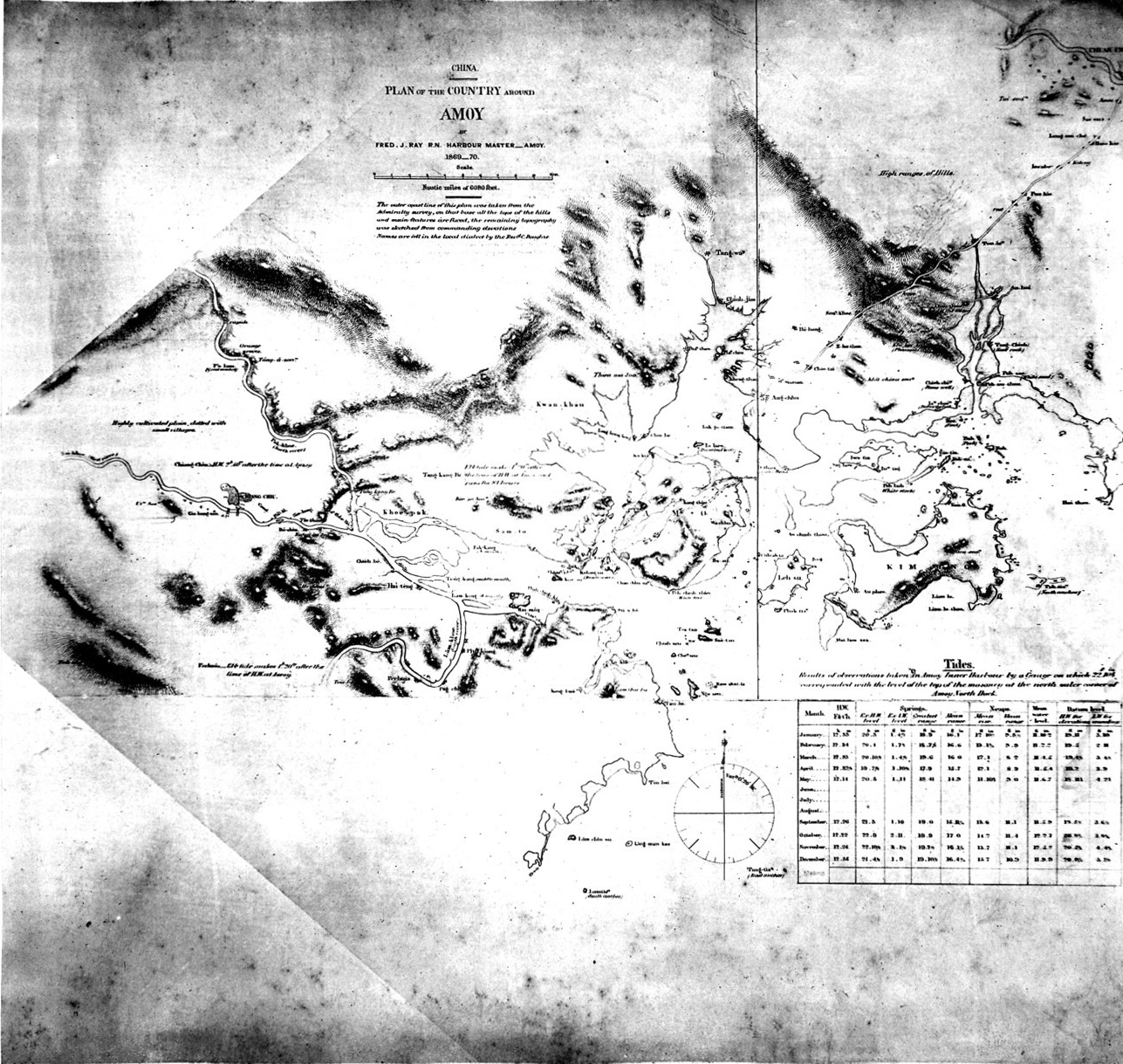
"Plan of the Country around Amoy", 1870

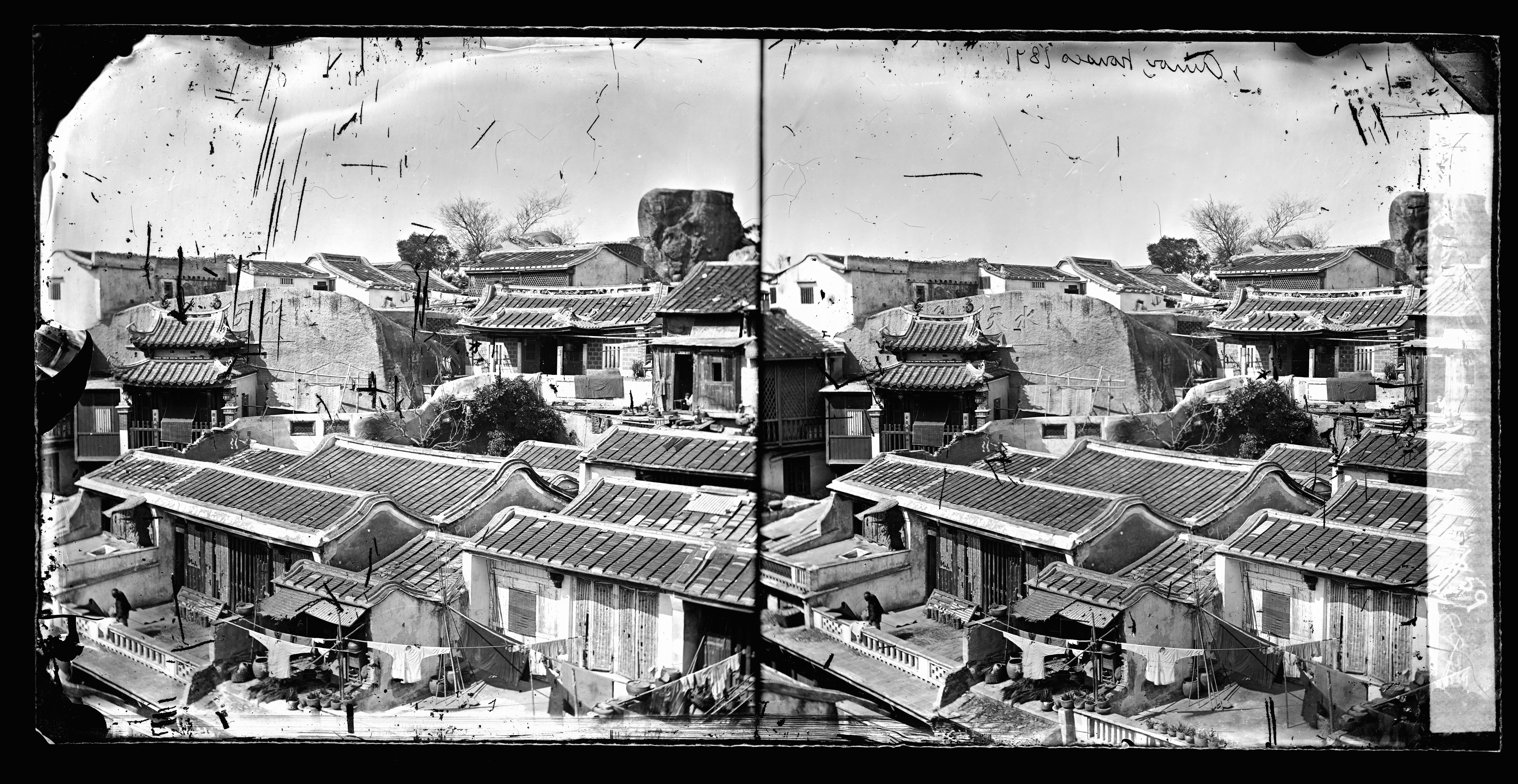
A stereogram of houses in Xiamen c. 1870

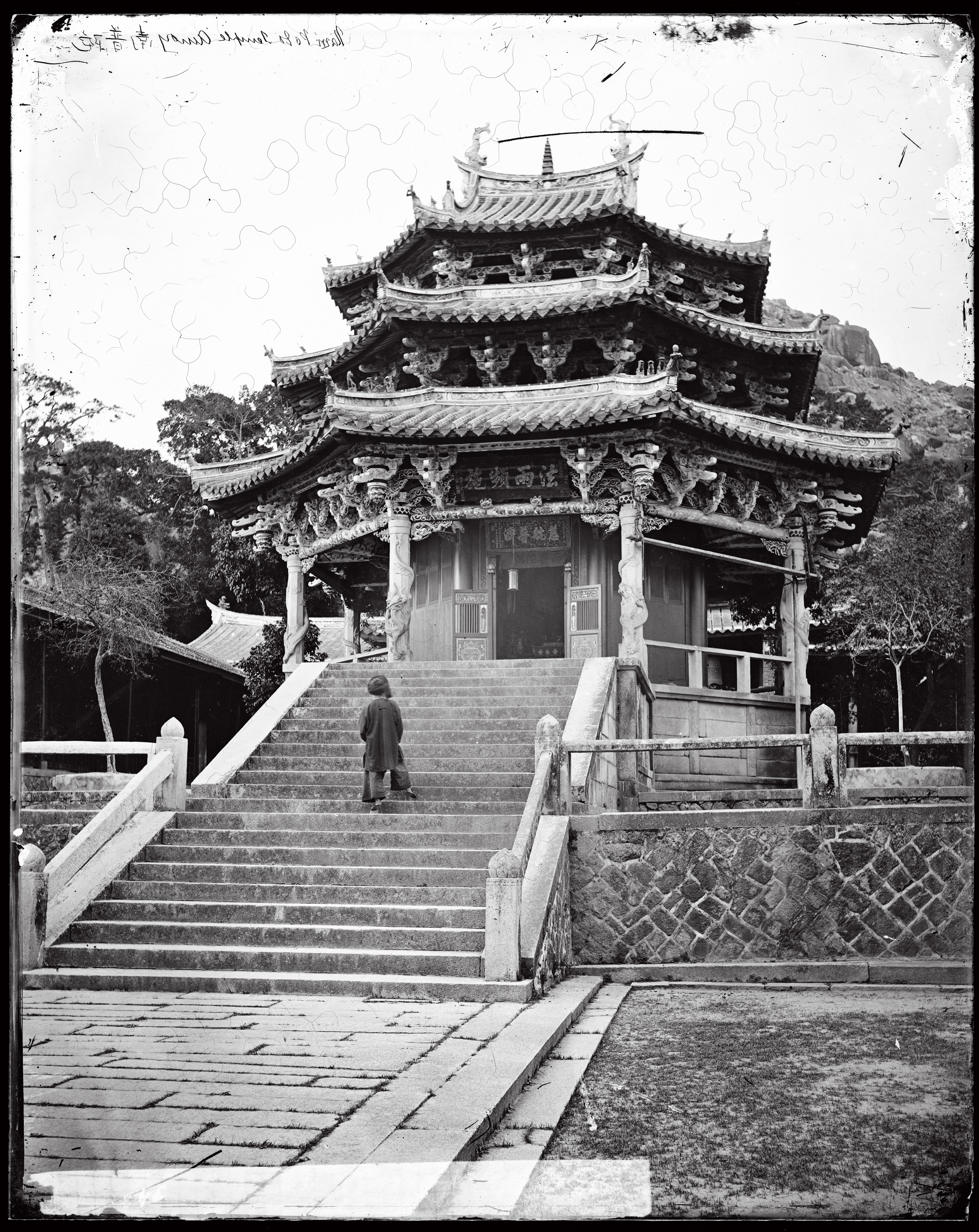
Nanputuo Temple c. 1870

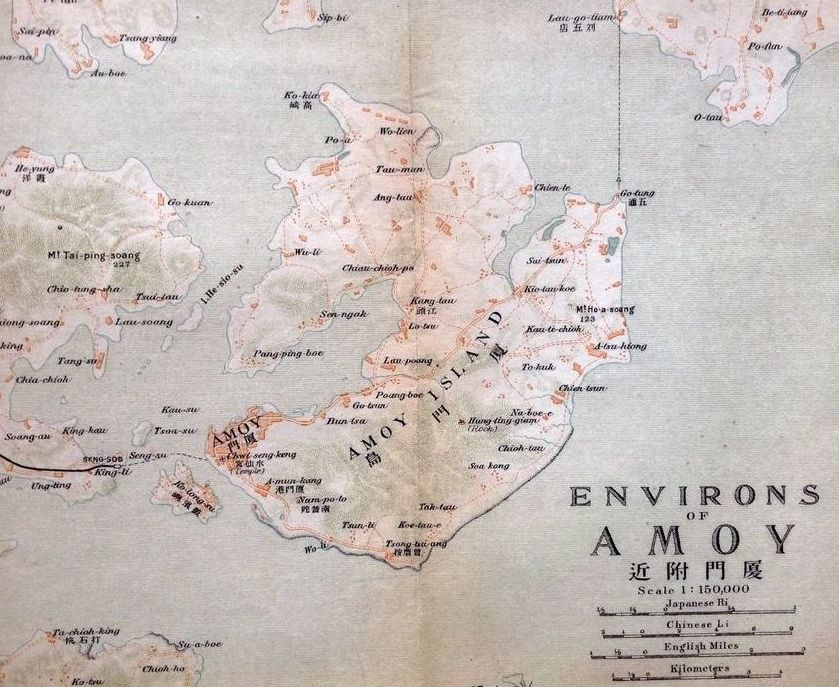
A 1915 map of the "Environs of Amoy", showing the city and island before the massive land reclamation projects of the 20th century.

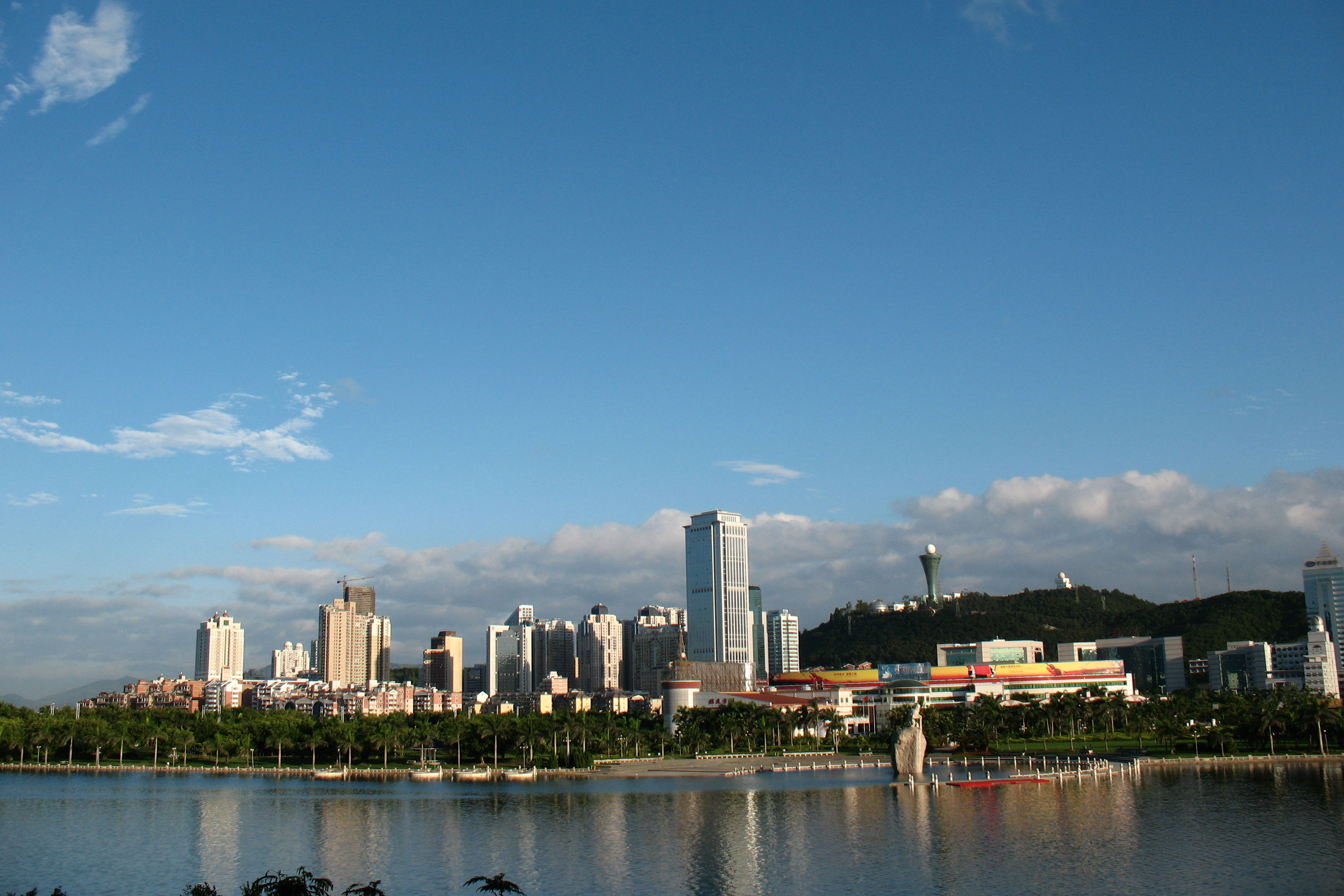
Siming District, looking north from the southern shore of Yundang Lake

By the 20th century, the local export economy had collapsed due to the success of British tea plantations in India. During the Qing and the early 20th century, many southern Fujianese emigrated to Taiwan and Southeast Asia, such as in the Philippines, Indonesia, Brunei, Malaysia, Singapore, Thailand, Myanmar, etc., spreading Hokkien language and culture overseas. Some 350,000 overseas Chinese currently trace their ancestry to Xiamen. Some of this diaspora later returned: an estimated 220,000 Xiamen residents are returning overseas Chinese and their kin. Others continue to help fund universities and cultural institutions in Xiamen.

At the time of the Xinhai Revolution, the native population of the city was estimated at 300,000 and the foreign settlement at 280. After the establishment of the Republic of China, the area around Xiamen was renamed Siming County. Xiamen's trade during the period was largely conducted through Taiwan, which had been seized by Japan during the First Sino-Japanese War. The Japanese subsequently claimed Fujian as their sphere of influence during the colonial squabbling over China. Japan occupied Xiamen Island from May 1938 to September 1945 during World War II. During the Japanese occupation, the city provided some shipments of rice to the Portuguese Colony of Macau. In the late phases of the Chinese Civil War that followed, the Communists captured Xiamen and Gulangyu in October 1949 but failed to capture Kinmen. The same year, Xiamen became a provincially administered city (省辖市).

In 1955 and 1958, mainland China escalated Cold War political tensions by shelling nearby islands from Xiamen in what became known as the First and Second Taiwan Strait Crisis. The Nationalists responded by reinforcing Kinmen and shelling Xiamen. The Gaoji Causeway built from 1955 to 1957 notionally transformed Xiamen Island into a peninsula, and so it was termed in the heady propaganda of the time. Due to political tensions, the eastern half of Xiamen Island and much of the Fujian Coast facing the offshore islands remained undeveloped in the 1960s and 1970s. The Water Police and Post-Office were situated directly across the water from the American embassy.

When Deng Xiaoping initiated his Opening Up Policy, Xiamen was made one of the first four special economic zones in 1980, with special investment and trade regulations attracting foreign investment, particularly from overseas Chinese. The construction of Huli Export Processing Zone in Xiamen Special Economic Zone was officially started on 15 October 1981. In 1984, Xiamen Special Economic Zone was expanded from an area of 2.5 square kilometers of Huli to 131 square kilometers of the whole island. The city grew and prospered. In June 2010, Xiamen Special Economic Zone was expanded to the whole Xiamen city, and four districts outside Xiamen Island – including Jimei, Haicang, Tongan and Xiang'an – were included into the zone. After this expansion, the area of Xiamen Special Economic Zone reached 1,573 square kilometers, 11 times larger than before.

Answering the call of the Belt and Road Initiative, Xiamen has focused on dealing with international competition with a more confident attitude and to facilitate the construction of the important hub city of the 21st Century Maritime Silk Road.

In 2001, the governments of mainland China and Taiwan agreed to initiate the "Three Mini-Links" and restored ferry, commercial, and mail links between the mainland and offshore islands. Trade and travel between Xiamen and Kinmen was restored and later expanded to include direct air travel to Taiwan Island. In 2010, travelers between Xiamen and Kinmen made 1.31 million trips.

In 2006, Xiamen was ranked as China's 2nd-"most suitable city for living", as well as China's "most romantic leisure city" in 2011.

== Geography ==
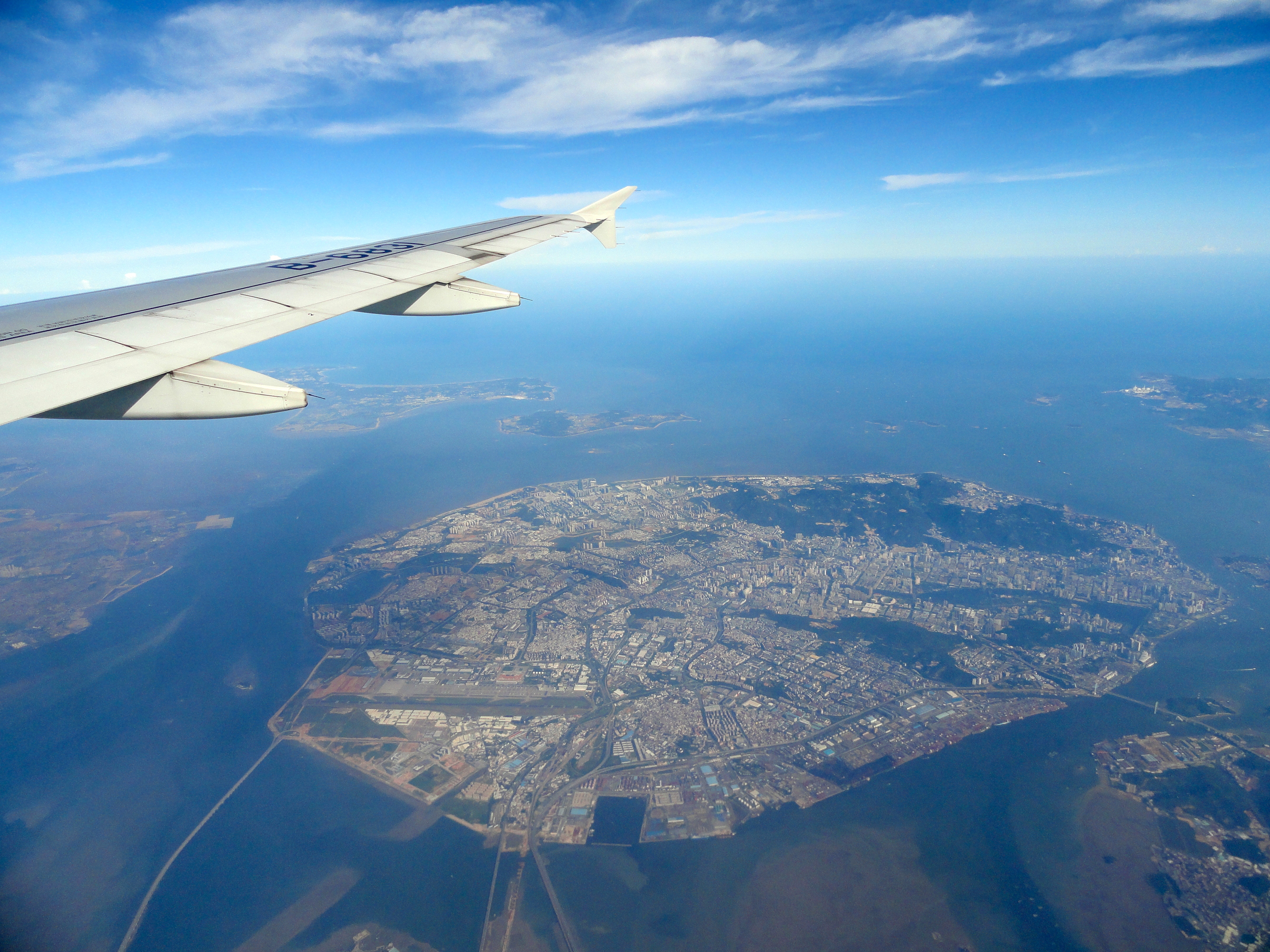
Aerial view of Xiamen Island, looking south. The Gaoji Causeway lies at the bottom and the old Yundang Harbor—now an inclosed lake—lies to the right. The Kinmen Islands, Republic of China (Taiwan) can be seen in the upper half of the photograph.

Xiamen is a sub-provincial city in southeastern Fujian whose urban core grew up from the port of Xiamen on southern Xiamen Island, now located within Siming District. It now also includes Gulangyu Island and the rugged coast of the mainland from the northeast bank of the Jiulong River in the west to the islands of Xiang'an in the east. Xiamen Island lies about one degree north of the Tropic of Cancer. It is divided between Huli District in the north and Siming District in the south. Siming also includes Gulangyu. Its mainland territory is divided among Haicang, Jimei, Tong'an, and Xiang'an districts.

In the 19th century, Xiamen's harbor on Yundang Bay was considered one of the world's great natural harbors. Land reclamation has since been used to fill in the mouth of this inlet, turning it into Siming District's Yundang Lake. The municipal government is located on other reclaimed land beside it.

The nearest point of Liehyu in the Kinmen Islands, Republic of China (Taiwan), lies only 6 kilometers (4 mi) off Xiamen Island.

Xiamen Island is the fourth largest island in Fujian province. It became a peninsula after the completion of the seawall in 1955. Xiamen waters include Xiamen Port, Outer Harbor Area, Maluan Bay, Tongan Bay, Jiulong River's estuary area and the waterway on the east side. Outside the Xiamen Port, Big Kinmen, Little Kinmen, Dadan, Erdan and other island are arranged in a horizontal line. Inside, it has Xiamen Island, Gulangyu Island and other island barriers, making it a good natural port protected from storms.

=== Climate ===
Xiamen has a monsoonal humid subtropical climate (Köppen Cfa), characterised by long, hot and humid summers (but moderate compared to much of the rest of the province) and short, mild and dry winters. The warmest month is July, with a 24-hour average of 28.3 °C (82.9 °F), and the coolest month is January, averaging 13.1 °C (55.6 °F); the annual mean is 21.1 °C (70.0 °F). Extremes since 1951 have ranged from 0.1 °C (32 °F) on 24 January 2016 to 39.6 °C (103 °F) on 9 August 2019. Spring, both by humidity and percentage of sunshine, is the dampest season but typhoons in late summer and early autumn can make the latter period wetter overall. Summer and autumn are marked by comparatively sunny conditions, while autumn is warm and dry. The annual rainfall is 1,301 millimeters (51 in). With monthly percent possible sunshine ranging from 29% in March to 58% in July, the city receives 1,893 hours of bright sunshine annually. Frost occurs very rarely, and the last snowfall in the city took place in January 1893, when snow also fell at Guangzhou, Macau, in the inland parts of Hong Kong and in the hills of Taipei.

The area is known within China for its relatively low pollution.

Climate data for Xiamen, elevation 139 m (456 ft), (1991–2020 normals, extremes 1951–present)
Month	Jan	Feb	Mar	Apr	May	Jun	Jul	Aug	Sep	Oct	Nov	Dec	Year
Record high °C (°F)	28.4 (83.1)	28.4 (83.1)	29.6 (85.3)	33.6 (92.5)	35.4 (95.7)	36.1 (97.0)	39.2 (102.6)	39.6 (103.3)	35.4 (95.7)	36.0 (96.8)	32.8 (91.0)	27.9 (82.2)	39.6 (103.3)
Mean daily maximum °C (°F)	17.5 (63.5)	17.9 (64.2)	20.2 (68.4)	24.3 (75.7)	27.6 (81.7)	30.1 (86.2)	32.5 (90.5)	32.2 (90.0)	30.8 (87.4)	27.7 (81.9)	24.1 (75.4)	19.5 (67.1)	25.4 (77.7)
Daily mean °C (°F)	13.1 (55.6)	13.5 (56.3)	15.6 (60.1)	19.8 (67.6)	23.4 (74.1)	26.4 (79.5)	28.3 (82.9)	28.0 (82.4)	26.7 (80.1)	23.5 (74.3)	19.8 (67.6)	15.3 (59.5)	21.1 (70.0)
Mean daily minimum °C (°F)	10.5 (50.9)	10.8 (51.4)	12.8 (55.0)	16.8 (62.2)	20.8 (69.4)	24.0 (75.2)	25.6 (78.1)	25.3 (77.5)	24.1 (75.4)	20.9 (69.6)	17.1 (62.8)	12.6 (54.7)	18.4 (65.2)
Record low °C (°F)	0.1 (32.2)	2.6 (36.7)	2.5 (36.5)	6.4 (43.5)	12.2 (54.0)	16.3 (61.3)	20.7 (69.3)	21.4 (70.5)	16.7 (62.1)	13.3 (55.9)	7.5 (45.5)	1.5 (34.7)	0.1 (32.2)
Average precipitation mm (inches)	42.0 (1.65)	70.2 (2.76)	98.5 (3.88)	120.1 (4.73)	171.0 (6.73)	203.2 (8.00)	130.5 (5.14)	215.6 (8.49)	121.7 (4.79)	49.0 (1.93)	36.7 (1.44)	42.7 (1.68)	1,301.2 (51.22)
Average rainy days (≥ 0.1 mm)	7.1	9.3	12.8	12.2	14.5	14.7	9.5	11.5	8.7	3.2	4.6	5.7	121.0
Average relative humidity (%)	73	77	78	79	82	85	80	80	75	67	70	70	76
Mean monthly sunshine hours	131.0	106.5	109.0	126.6	137.1	160.8	241.9	205.9	182.1	189.3	157.3	145.5	1,893
Percentage possible sunshine	39	33	29	33	33	39	58	52	50	53	48	44	43
Source: China Meteorological Administration all-time extreme temperature

== Demographics ==
A large number of the populace are migrants.

According to the 2020 Census, Xiamen has a population of 5,163,970 inhabitants. According to the 2010 Census, Xiamen has a population of 3,531,347 inhabitants, almost 1.8 times the population counted for the last census in 2000 (which was of 2,053,070 inhabitants). The annual average population growth was of 5.57% for the period 2000–2010. This masks the population explosion in Jimei District, however, which quadrupled since the prior census; Huli District's population more than doubled. The resident population was 1,967,800 in 2013 yearend, and with a population of 3.73 million (those residing at least half a year). The total resident population is said to be 4,255,000 in December 2014, without specifying what counts as a resident.

By the end of 2025, the resident population of Xiamen has reached 5.365 million, the majority being Han people. There are also some ethnic minorities such as She and Hui.

=== Languages ===
As with all of China, the official language is Mandarin. Migrants of non-Hokkien ancestry usually speak Mandarin and/or their ancestral tongues.

The indigenous language is Hokkien, a subgroup of Southern Min, with the Tong'an dialect being the most populous and prevalent. The Xiamen dialect is mostly confined to the southwest quarter of Xiamen Island, while the Zhangzhou dialect is spoken in a section of Haicang District.

The English words "Amoy", "tea" (Chinese: 茶; Pe̍h-ōe-jī: tê), "cumshaw" (感謝; kám-siā), "pekoe" (白毫; pe̍h-hô), kowtow (磕頭; khàu-thâu), and "ketchup" (鮭汁; koê-chiap) are derived from the local Hokkien.

=== Religion ===
The first evidence of organised religion existed in the area was dated to Sui dynasty when Buddhism was first spread to Tong'an region and spread to Xiamen Island during Tang dynasty. In the 19th century, Xiamen proper had two Dutch Reformed (Note: The churches bore the names "Sin-Koe-a" and "Tek-Chhiu-Kha".) and two LMS churches. Xiamen Island was home to three Dutch Reformed missions at "Kang-thau", "Kio-than", and "Chhan-chhu-oa".

== Administration ==
Xiamen is a sub-provincial city of Fujian with direct jurisdiction over 6 districts.

Map	Name	Simplified Chinese	Pinyin	Population (2020 census)	Area (km^{2})	Density (/km^{2})
	Huli	湖里区	Húlǐ Qū	1,036,974	73.98	14,017
	Siming	思明区	Sīmíng Qū	1,073,315	84.00	12,778
	Haicang	海沧区	Hǎicāng Qū	582,519	186.82	3,118
	Jimei	集美区	Jíměi Qū	1,036,987	274.30	3,780
	Tong'an	同安区	Tóng'ān Qū	855,920	669.36	1,279
	Xiang'an	翔安区	Xiáng'ān Qū	578,255	412.15	1,403

In May 2003, Gulangyu and Kaiyuan districts were merged into Siming District; Xinglin District (杏林区) was merged into Jimei District; and Xiang'an District was created out of a section of Tong'an District.

== Economy ==
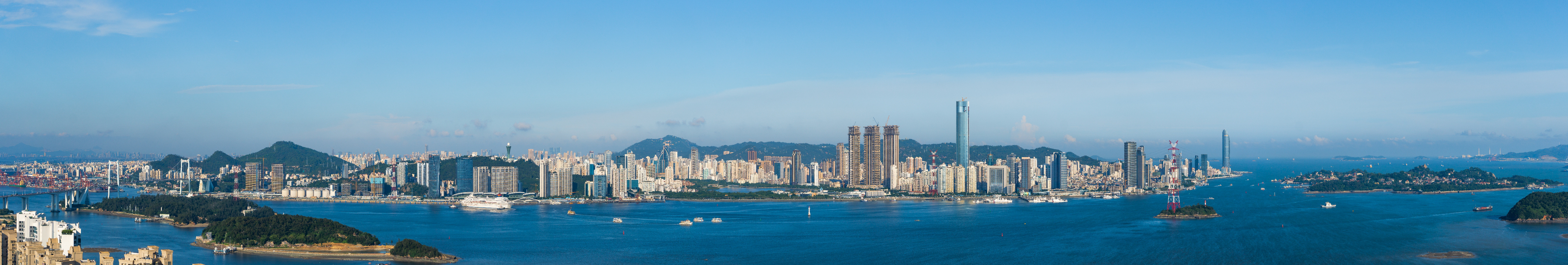
View of Xiamen Island from Haicang District

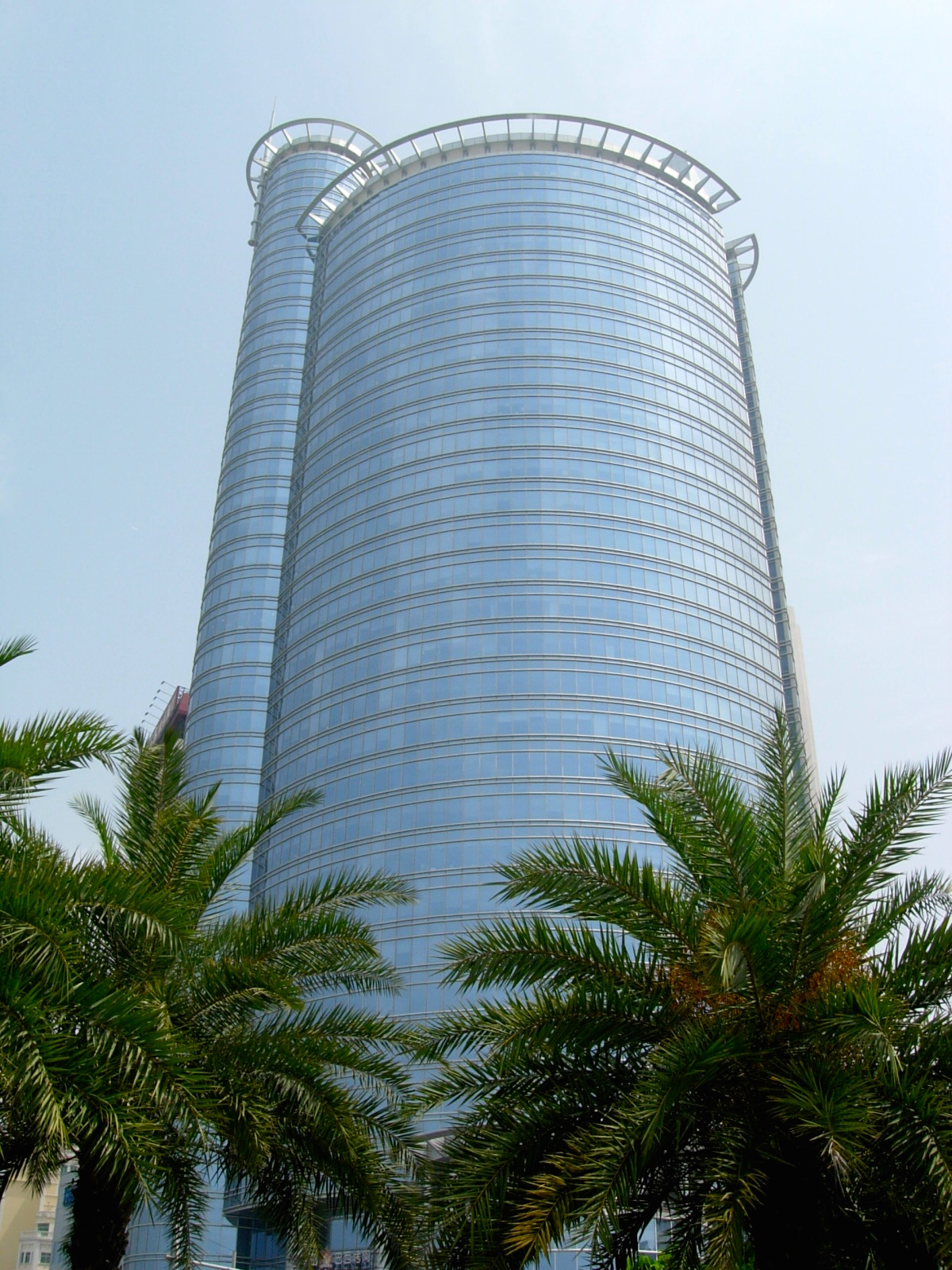
Xiamen International Bank Building

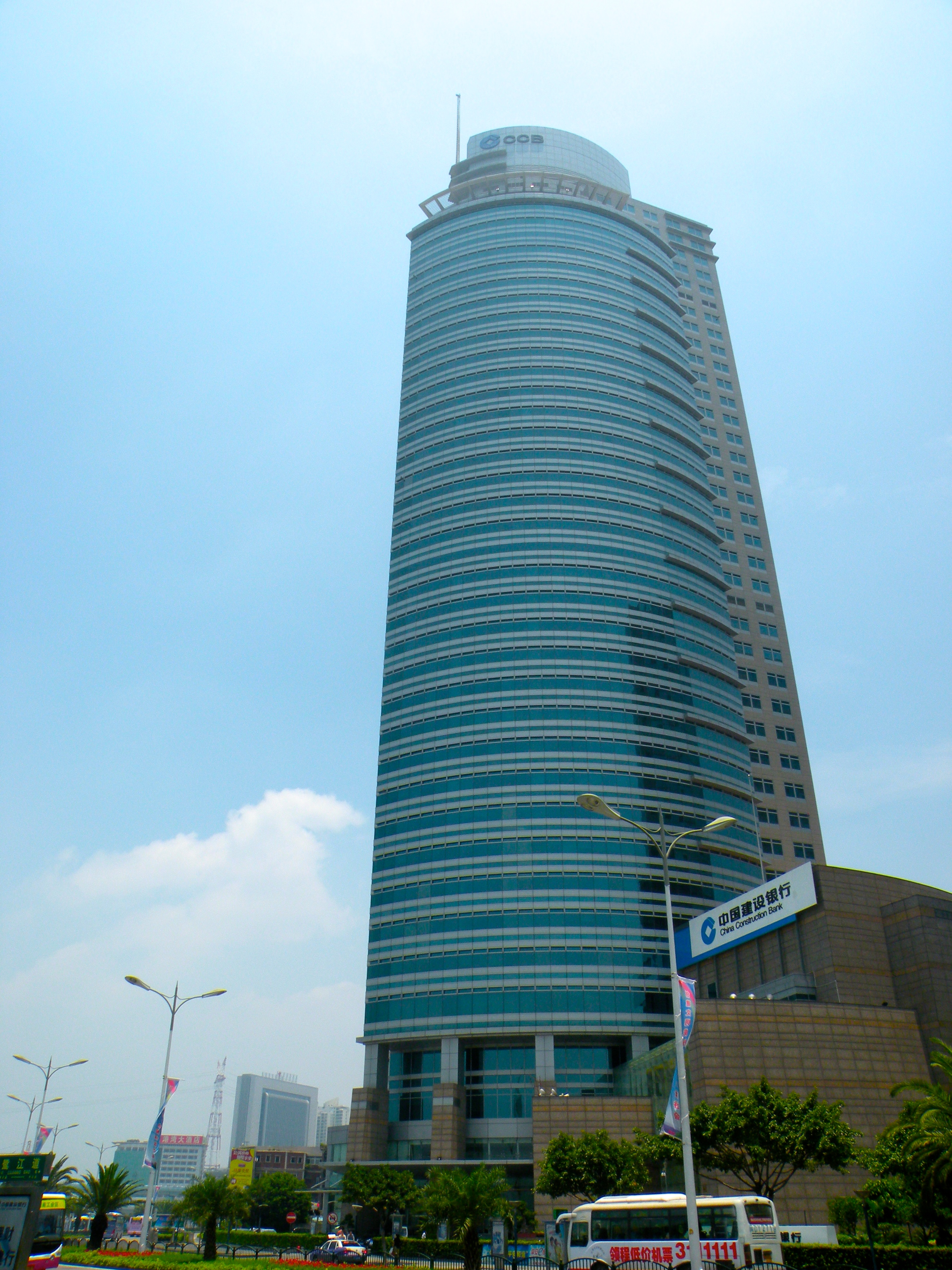
China Construction Bank Building, Xiamen

Xiamen has a diverse and well-developed economy. It is the first to refer to the business environment indexes of the World Bank with the aim of creating world's first-rated business environment. In 2018, its business environment ranked 2nd among 22 cities across the country that was evaluated by the National Development and Reform Commission. Its measures in areas such as dealing with construction permits, getting electricity, and trading across borders take the lead in the country.

Its social credit system has been improved. In 2018, its overall credit index ranked 2nd among 36 provincial capitals and sub-provincial cities and above.

The Siming and Huli districts form its Special Economic Zone.

Xiamen focuses on the development of five major industries – electronic information, equipment manufacturing, tourism and culture, modern logistics, and financial services.

Xiamen's GDP has grown at an average annual rate of 15.4 percent since China's reform and opening-up four decades ago. In 2018, per capita GDP: 118,015 yuan ($17,105); per capita disposable income: 50,948 yuan; public financial budget revenue: 128.3 billion yuan; 1,626 hi-tech enterprises, accounting for 44 percent of the total number of Fujian province; 600.5 billion yuan of total foreign trade value; degree of dependence on foreign trade has reached 125 percent.

By the end of 2018, Xiamen brought in a total of 14,818 foreign-invested projects; contractual foreign investments: $66 billion, actual foreign investments: $37.9 billion; 62 overseas Fortune 500 companies invested in 112 projects in Xiamen.

Xiamen is also the host of the China International Fair for Investment and Trade held annually in early September to attract foreign direct investment into mainland China.

Xiamen also hold Straits Forum annually. The 2019 edition kicked off in the coastal city from 15 to 21 June. More than 10,000 people attended the annual forum this year.

In 2023 forecast by the city government, Xiamen is aiming for 25,000 of GDP per capita measured by USD.

=== Financial services ===
Xiamen has highly developed banking services. The biggest bank is the state-owned commercial bank, Sino-foreign joint venture Xiamen International Bank, solely foreign-funded Xiamen Bank, and Xiamen Rural Commercial Bank.

Various foreign banks that have established representative offices in Xiamen.

=== Development zones ===
Haicang Investment Zone (廈門海滄台商資區区) is situated to the southeast of Xiamen Island, at the tip of the Xiamen-Zhangzhou-Quanzhou Delta in South Fujian bordering Zhangzhou City to the west, Jimei District to the north, and overlooking Xiamen Island across the narrow water. The 100-square-kilometer Haicang Investment Zone is the largest national investment zone for Taiwan business people authorized by the State Council in 1989. It is situated close to Xiamen Port. The zone aims at becoming a new port area, a new industrial area and a sub-center of greater Xiamen in the 21st century. It is divided into the following four functional areas in line with its overall plan: Haicang Port Area, Xinyang Industrial Area, Southern Industrial Area and Haicang New Urban Area.

Xiamen Area of China (Fujian) Pilot Free Trade Zone (福建自贸试验区厦门片区管委会) is located in the northwest part of Xiamen, within the area of Dongdu port. Near No 319 national road and Yingxia railway, it is connected with Gaoqi International Airport. On 15 October 1992, the State Council approved establishment of the zone with an area of 5 square kilometers; the first phase covers 0.63 square kilometers and was put into operation on 28 November 1993. It is the most modern international logistics zone in the southeast part of China.

Xiamen Torch Development Zone for High Technology Industries (厦门火炬高新区管委会) was jointly established by the former State Scientific and Technological Commission and the Xiamen municipal government in 1990 and has gradually developed into "one zone with multi parks". A favorable investment environment and high returns has made the zone into a hot spot for foreign investment. Bourns Inc. of the United States concluded the zone the most ideal target for foreign investors in China. Some of the world's top 500 companies such as Dell, ABB Switch, ABB Low-Voltage, ABB High-Voltage, Panasonic, FDK, Xiamen Tungaloy, and Fujitsu are rapidly expanding their operations in Xiamen. The zone is oriented towards information technology, biotechnology, new energy, new materials, oceanology, advanced manufacturing, and environment technology. Most of its exports go to countries and areas such as the US, Japan, Southeast Asia, West Europe, Hong Kong, Macao and Taiwan. Hi-tech exports include computers, color monitors, microscopes, power supply units, integrated circuits, stepping motors, wireless telephones, switching equipment, tungsten carbide micro-drills, and similar products.

=== Key industries ===
==== Panel display industry ====
Xiamen is one of China's regions with rapid development of the TFT liquid crystal display (LCD) industry. Its industrial scale ranks sixth in the country and is the only pilot city with a national optoelectronic display industrial cluster. The city also has the largest R&D and production base of touch screen modules in the world. Xiamen's panel display industry reached an output value of 131.5 billion yuan in 2018, forming a complete industrial chain layout. Industrial parks include Xiamen Tongan Xiang'an Hi-tech Industrial Base and Xiamen Torch Hi-Tech Industrial Zone (Xiang'an).

==== Computer and communication equipment industry ====
Xiamen has gathered integrated manufacturing enterprises in such fields as complete computers, mobile phones, mobile phone lenses, micro motors, flexible circuit boards, bluetooth and wireless access equipment, and positioning and navigation sensors, as well assupporting enterprises of basic components, accessories, external equipment and IT services. The complete machine brand has global influence. The industry reached an output value of 120.4 billion yuan ($17.68 billion) in 2018. Industrial parks include Xiamen Tongan Xiang'an Hi-tech Industrial Base and Xiamen Torch Hi-Tech Industrial Zone (Xiang'an).

==== Semiconductor and integrated circuits industry ====
Xiamen is home to more than 200 integrated circuit (IC) enterprises which form an industrial chain covering IC design, manufacturing, testing, equipment and materials as well as applications. Xiamen's IC industry reached an output value of 41.7 billion yuan ($6.11 billion) in 2018. Industrial parks include Xiamen Tongan Xiang'an Hi-tech Industrial Base, Xiamen Science and Technology Innovation Park, Xiamen Haicang Information Industrial Park, and Xiamen IC Strait Free Trade Zone Industrial Base.

==== Software and information services industry ====
The software and information services industry in Xiamen covers various fields including the platform economy, industrial application software, animation and games and cloud computing and information security. The city has won the title of "China's Characteristic City in Software". The industrial output value of Xiamen's software and information services industry in 2018 reached 149.3 billion yuan ($21.78 billion), with Xiamen Software Park accounting for 67 percent of that figure.

==== Machinery and equipment industry ====
Xiamen's machinery and equipment industry covers five industrial sectors – large and medium-sized passenger cars, power transmission and distribution equipment, aviation maintenance, engineering machinery and shipbuilding, with an output value of 103.7 billion yuan ($15.13 billion) in 2018. Industrial parks include Xiamen Machinery industry concentration area, Xiamen Torch Power Transmission and Distribution Industry Base, Xiamen Haicang Ship Industrial Zone, Xiamen Aviation Industrial Zone, and Xiamen Airport Industrial Zone.

==== New materials industry ====
Xiamen's new materials industry is dominated by special metal materials and advanced polymer materials, including photoelectric information materials, new energy, energy saving and environmental protection materials, and advanced carbon nanomaterials. The industry reached an output value of 88.9 billion yuan ($12.95 billion) in 2018. Industrial parks include Xiamen Tongan Xiang'an Hi-tech Industrial Base and Xiamen Torch Hi-Tech Industrial Zone (Xiang'an).

==== Tourism industry ====
Xiamen has been designated as a Top Tourist City in China, a Demonstration City of Tourism and Leisure in China, and one of China's romantic leisure cities. The popularity of holiday tourism and tourist satisfaction in Xiamen have long ranked among the highest in China while the city's inbound tourism and foreign exchange earnings have ranked among the country's top 10. The number of people travelling to Taiwan via Xiamen Port ranks first in China.

==== Exhibition industry ====
In 2018, Xiamen held a total of 229 exhibitions, with a total exhibition area of 2.38 million square meters, up 8.6 percent year-on-year. The hotels and conference centers in the city hosted 9,262 commercial meetings with more than 50 people attending, up 12.1 percent year-on-year. The total number of participants from home and abroad to Xiamen reached 1.88 million, with a year-on-year increase of 12.1 percent. The total revenue of the exhibition industry in Xiamen reached 40.3 billion yuan ($5.86 billion). Industrial parks include Xiamen International Conference & Exhibition Center, Xiamen International Conference Center, Xiamen Fliport Conference & Exhibition Center, and Xiamen east sports exhibition area (under construction).

==== Culture and creativity industry ====
Xiamen has seen rapid development in creative design, the film industry and high-end artworks in recent years. The city was listed among the first National Culture Export Bases and is home to the world's third Red Dot Design Museum. Also, the Golden Rooster and Hundred Flowers Film Festival, one of the top events in China's film industry, is to be presented in Xiamen once every two years for the 10 years following 2019. The total revenue of Xiamen's culture and creativity industry reached 104 billion yuan ($15.13 billion) in 2018. Industrial parks include National demonstration base for the integration of culture and science and technology, National Fujian and Taiwan cultural industry experimental park, Longshan cultural and creative industrial park, Huli creative industrial park, Jimeiji film and television industrial park, Tongan cultural industrial park, and Cross-Straits architectural design cultural and creative park.

==== Modern logistics industry ====
Xiamen has been approved as a national modern logistics innovation and development city, a national cross-border e-commerce comprehensive pilot zone, a smart logistics city and a logistics standardization pilot zone, and a demonstration city for the standardization of cold chain circulation of agricultural products. In 2018, the modern logistics industry in Xiamen achieved an output value of 118 billion yuan ($17.17 billion). And Xiamen port ranked 7th in China and 14th in the world in terms of container throughput. Xiamen has formed a freight hub integrating the southeast coastal area highways and railroads. There are five logistics industry agglomeration areas in Xiamen: Haicang and Dongdu port-surrounding areas, Qianchang, Tongan and Xiang'an.

==== Financial services industry ====
In 2018, Xiamen's total revenue of financial services reached 152.9 billion yuan ($22.24 billion), and added value accumulated to 52.4 billion yuan. Industrial parks include Xiamen cross-Straits financial center and Xiamen Area of China (Fujian) Pilot Free Trade Zone.

==== Bio-medicine and health industry ====
Xiamen is a pilot city for the regional agglomeration of emerging industries in bio-medicine, with a total output value of 58.9 billion yuan ($8.56 billion) in 2018. A total of 241 State-level high-tech enterprises have settled in the city. Xiamen Biobay is the incubation center for local bio-medicine achievements.

Xiamen Yarui Optical is one of the world's largest eyeglasses manufacturers, and its trade name Bolon is China's largest eyewear brand.

==== Urban modern agriculture industry ====
Urban modern agriculture in Xiamen covers the planting industry, animal husbandry, agricultural and sideline products, the food processing industry, rural tourism and ecological leisure agriculture. In 2018, Xiamen's agricultural product processing developed steadily, with 44 leading agricultural industrialization enterprises generating sales revenue of 55.3 billion yuan ($8.05 billion). Industrial parks include Xiamen cross-Straits agricultural high-tech park, Xiamen Tongan National Agricultural Science and Technology Park, Xiamen Tongan light industry food industrial park, Agricultural and sideline products logistics center of southern Fujian, and Leisure agriculture areas including Xiangshan, Damaoshan and Zhubawuxian.

==== Automotive ====
Sanyang Motor's subsidiary Xiamen Xiashing Motorcycle Company, Limited operates an ODM/Original equipment manufacturer motorcycle parts manufacturing plant in Xiamen. The products are manufactured to support French-based Peugeot Motocycles and Korean-based S&T.

== Transportation ==
=== Local transportation ===
The Gaoji Causeway, five main road bridges (the Jimei, Xiamen, Xiang'an, Xinglin, and Haicang Bridges), and two undersea tunnels (Xiang'an Tunnel and Haicang Tunnel) link Xiamen Island with the mainland.

The main forms of public transportation in Xiamen are buses, bus rapid transit (BRT), and the subway. People now can use Alipay, a mobile payment application by Alibaba, to pay for the city's bus, subway, and BRT.

Taxis can be easily hailed in most areas of the city. Bicycles are commonly used by residents, especially on Xiamen Island. Unlike many Chinese cities, motorcycles, mopeds, tricycles, and wooden handcarts are not permitted in Xiamen Island (Siming and Huli). The city has upheld a ban on these vehicles since the 1990s. Electric bikes are permitted with proper licensing and obedience of traffic laws. On the small island of Gulangyu off Xiamen Island, automobiles are also banned.

=== Railway ===
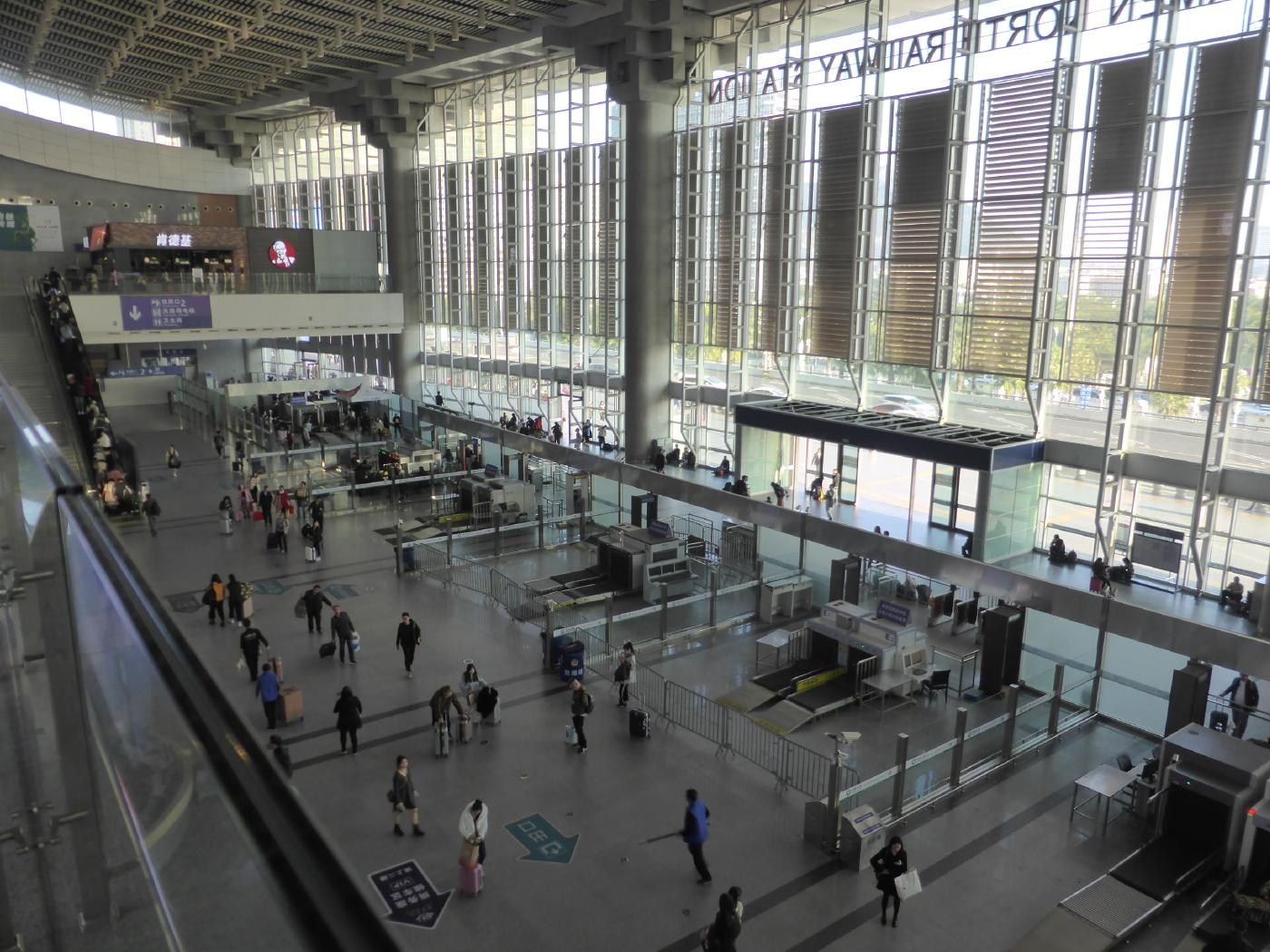
Xiamen North Railway Station

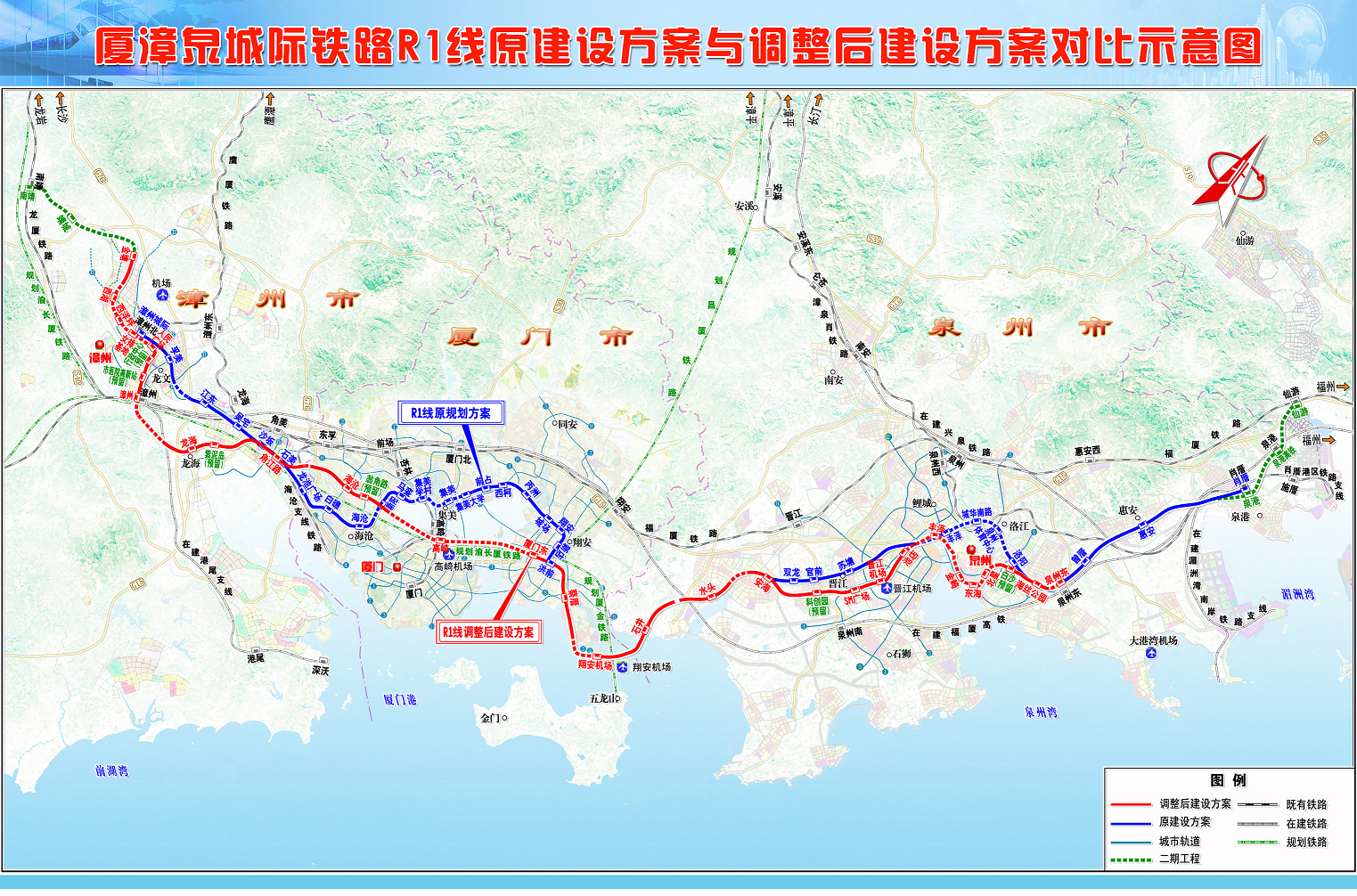
Map of the Quanzhou–Xiamen–Zhangzhou Intercity Railway Line Stations

Xiamen is a railway hub city in southeast coast of China and has two stations, Xiamen Railway Station and Xiamen North Railway Station. Passengers can buy the tickets on www.12306.cn.

Xiamen is served by the Yingtan–Xiamen railway, Fuzhou–Xiamen railway, Longyan–Xiamen railway and the Xiamen–Shenzhen railway, which are connected to China's national railway network and make it possible for passengers to arrive in Shanghai in five hours, Shenzhen in three-hour, and Fuzhou in two hours, and the Fuzhou–Xiamen high-speed railway between Fuzhou and Xiamen was opened to traffic on 28 September 2023.

The Xiamen Railway Station on the island of Xiamen is connected to the mainland by a railway bridge. It is 10 km from Xiamen Gaoqi International Airport, 23 km from Xiamen North railway station and 7 km from Nanputuo Temple. First opened in 1957, it underwent major reconstruction and expansion in March 2014 and was put into service again on 4 February 2015.

The Xiamen North Railway Station is located in Jimei District. In operation since April 2010, the station is 13 kilometers from Xiamen Gaoqi International Airport and 23 km from Xiamen Railway Station. The station operates bullet trains only. At present, its trains run to Beijing, Shanghai, Fuzhou, Wuhan, Chongqing, Nanjing, Shenzhen and other cities.

The Quanzhou–Xiamen–Zhangzhou Intercity Railway Line is currently conducting on-site surveys, which will link the cities of Quanzhou, Xiamen and Zhangzhou together when completed.

=== Road ===
The expressway networks of Xiamen and the mid-west area of mainland China are connected seamlessly by Shenyang-Haikou Highway, Xiamen-Chengdu Highway, Xiamen-Shaxian Highway, and urban expressways.

=== Bridge ===
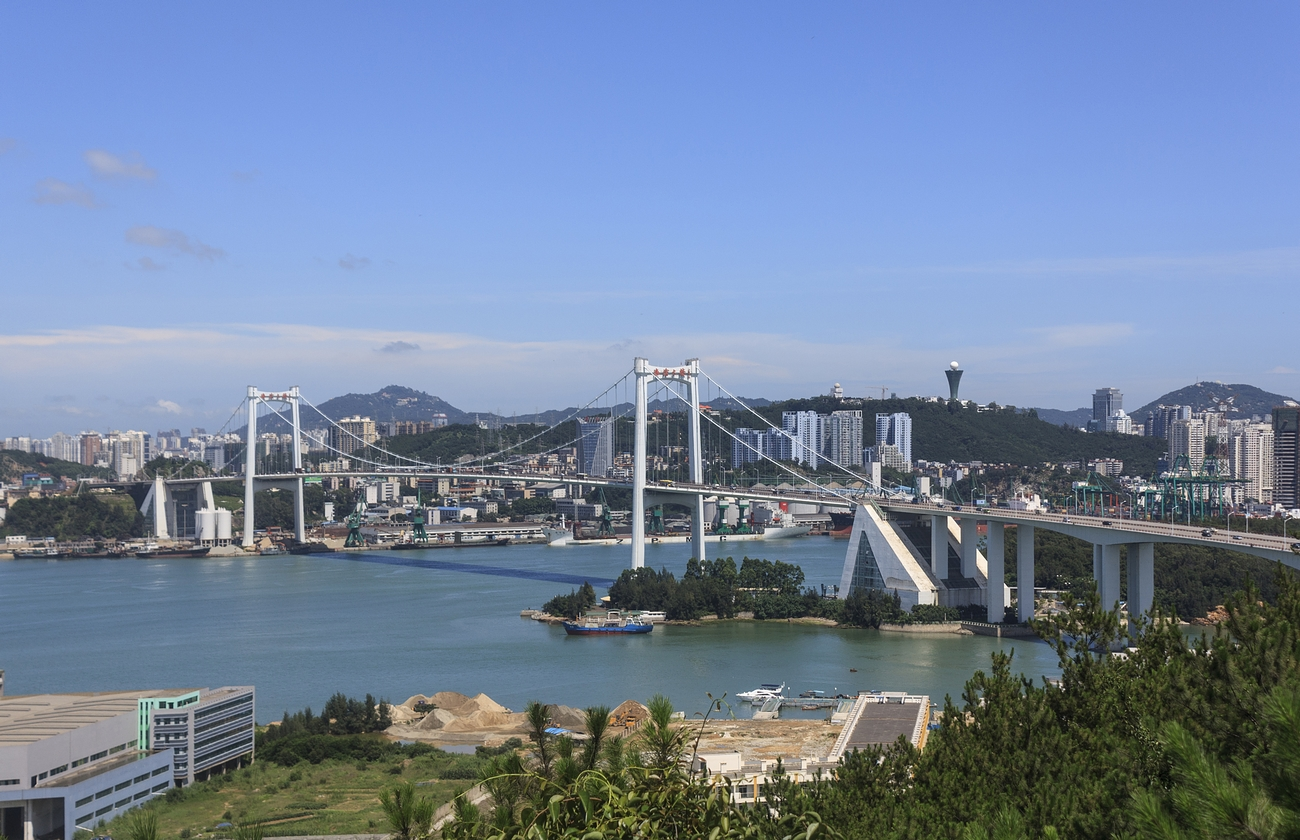
The Haicang Bridge in 2010

Xiamen Bridge, the first road bridge in China that crossed the straits, opened to public in 1991. Eight years later, Haicang Bridge was opened to traffic, which made it Asia's first and world's second suspension bridge with floating rebar at the time. In 2008, Xiamen built Jimei Bridge and Xinglin Bridge. Moreover, there is the Xiang'an Bridge, was opened to traffic on 17 January 2023. Meanwhile, 14 roads for entry and exit at the north gate of Xiamen were added to the map. Moreover, there is the Xiamen–Kinmen Bridge, scheduled to be opened to traffic in 2026, under construction. At present, Xiamen is working on a road system containing two inner and outer ring roads as well as eight supplementary roads.

=== Undersea tunnel ===
In addition to bridges, tunnels also help Xiamen connect the inside and outside parts of the island. Xiang'an Tunnel is China's first undersea tunnel with large cross-section and is also the sixth route to access Xiamen Island. It was opened to traffic on 26 April 2010, with a total length of 8.695 km, of which the tunnel part covering 6.05 km connecting Xiaman Island and Xiang'an district. Moreover, there is the Haicang Tunnel, was opened to traffic on 17 June 2021. It has a total length of 7.102 km, of which the tunnel part covering 6.293 km. It set three interchange to connect Haicang and Huli districts. Moreover, there is the Tong'an Tunnel, scheduled to be opened to traffic in 2028, under construction.

=== Subway ===
Xiamen subway initiated construction on 1 April 2014 and was put into experimental operation on 31 December 2017. According to Xiamen's rail traffic planning approved by the central government, the city has five metro lines by 16 September 2026 and will also accelerate the construction of Metro Line 9 and R1, with a total length of 325 kilometers. The city will witness the rapid development of its subway traffic network. The Metro Line 1, 2, 3, 4 and 6 has currently started operation.

=== BRT ===
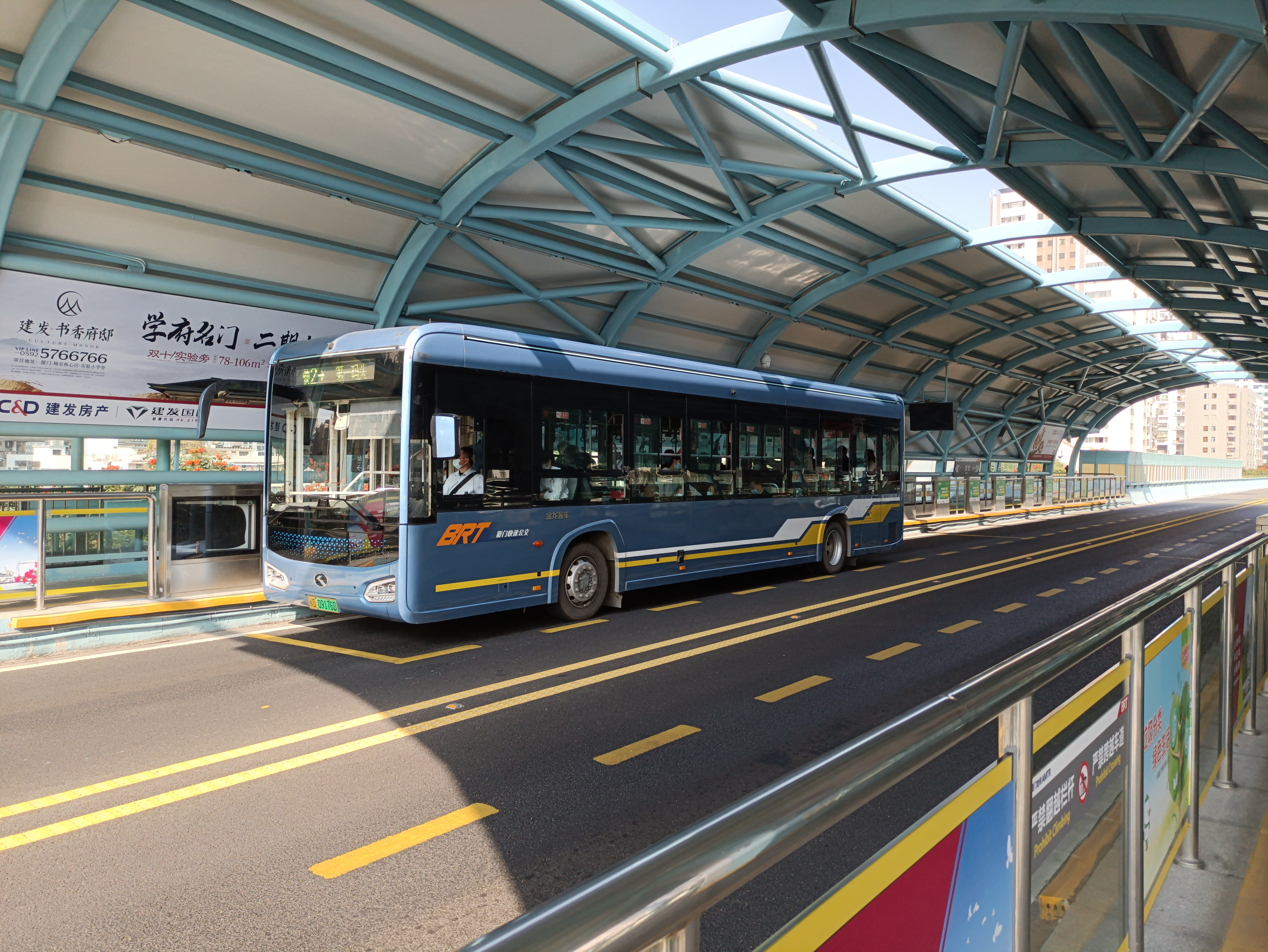
The Xiamen BRT at Wenzhao station. Its expressways and elevated roads form a closed network accessible only to the system's buses

Xiamen BRT was put into operation on 31 August 2008. Its BRT system features a dedicated bus-only closed road system with stations and ticketing system similar to light rail. Most of the 115-kilometer (71 mi) BRT network consists of bus lanes along expressways and elevated BRT viaducts on Xiamen Island. BRT routes have no traffic lights and travel speed is limited by design to 60 kilometers per hour (37 mph). Nine BRT routes are currently in service, including BRT-1 Route, BRT-2 Route, Huandao Avenue BRT Route, Chenggong Avenue BRT Route and Connecting BRT Route. The fare is 0.6 RMB per km for the air-conditioned buses. The BRT is supplemented by 20 shuttle bus services that connect nearby places to the BRT stations. The shuttle bus service has a flat rate of 0.5 RMB. Fare discount is available when pre-paid e-card is used.

=== Cycle-way ===
As early as 2013, Haicang built a 13.4-kilometer-long green cycle-way outside Xiamen Island, making it the first district in the city to fulfill a public bicycle system. At the beginning of 2017, Xiamen built the country's first and the world's longest aerial cycle-way. The white hollow guardrails with 1.5 meters high on both sides won't make people "fear of height" or cause any impact on the vision.

=== Air ===
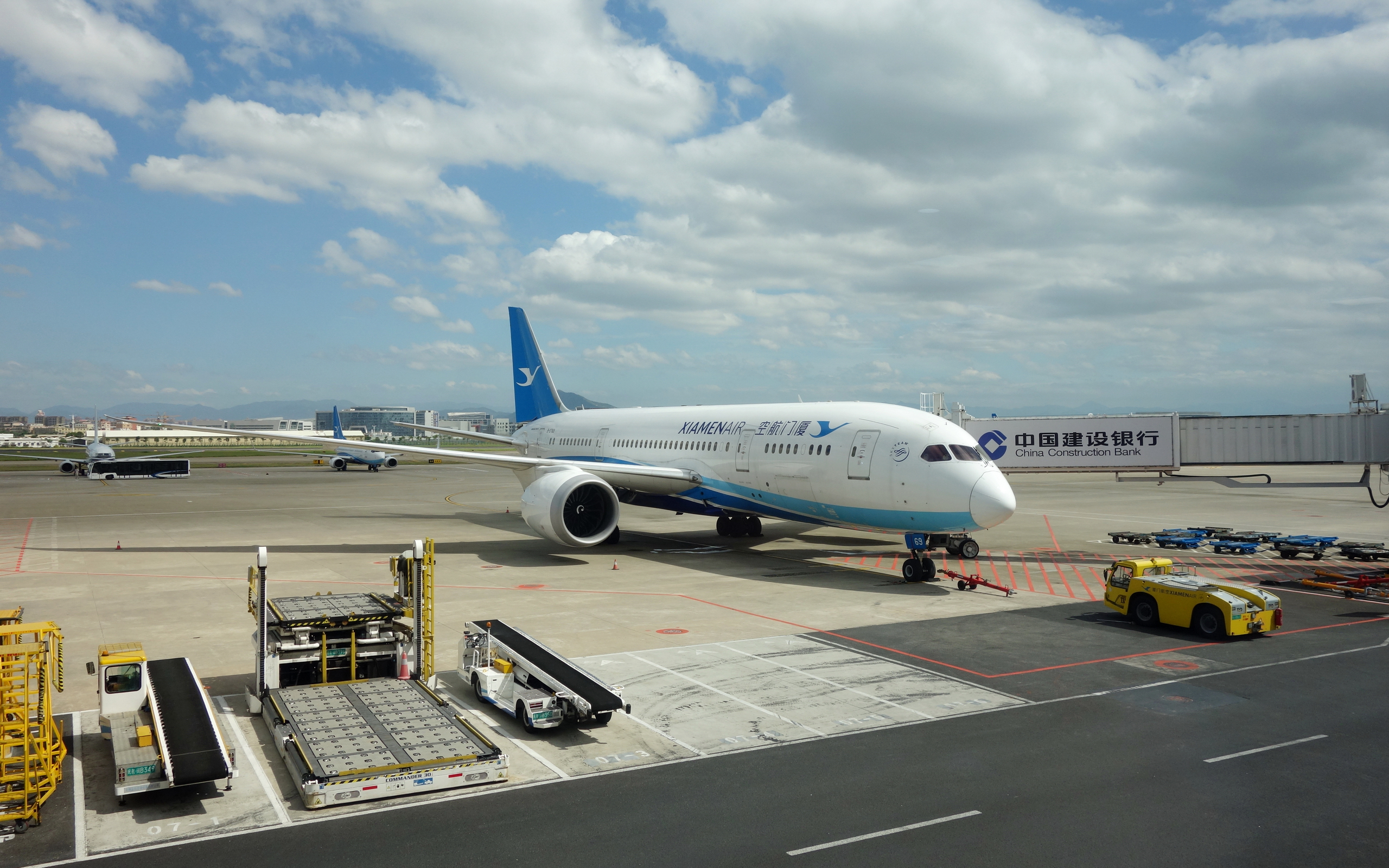
Boeing 787 Dreamliner of XiamenAir at Xiamen Gaoqi International Airport

The Xiamen Gaoqi International Airport (IATA: XMN; ICAO: ZSAM) in northeastern Xiamen Island is a main air hub in East China with flights to over 90 domestic and international destinations. Among airports in China, Xiamen ranked the top 16th by airport and the top 13th by city in 2025. It handled 29.1939 million passengers in 2025, up 4.61% year-on-year. Total cargo and mail traffic reached 377 thousand tons, and air traffic exceeded 198.6 thousand, year-on-year growth of 1.00% and 2.76%, respectively. The airport is the headquarters hub of XiamenAir and Air Road Cargo, and hub of Shandong Airlines, China Eastern Airlines and Spring Airlines.

Xiamen has now launched 187 routes to 128 cities, and is developing into an international air transit hub covering Asia, Europe, North America and Oceania.

Xiamen has also began the construction of a new airport, Xiamen Xiang'an International Airport, located on Dadeng Island, designed to replace Gaoqi Airport.

There are also coach bus services connecting Xiamen with Hong Kong International Airport (HKIA). Australasia's mass-transit provider SkyBus is deepening its ties in Asia by partnering with Xiamen Airlines.

Xiamen began offering 144-hour visa-free transit services to foreign travelers from 53 countries on 1 January 2019.

=== Sea ===
==== Ferries ====
Xiamen has passenger ferry services to cities along the coast of China as well as the neighbouring island of Kinmen (Quemoy) to the east, which is administered by the Republic of China on Taiwan. These ferries are all served from the Wutong Ferry Terminal to Shuitou Pier, Kinmen on the north-east side of the Xiamen Island (quite distant from downtown Xiamen), ferries to Kinmen take 60 minutes. There are facilities in both directions allowing for quick transfers between Xiamen Gaoqi Airport (for Mainland destinations) and Kinmen Airport (for Taiwanese destinations), which are very popular especially among large tour groups.

While the Heping Wharf Ferry Terminal on the south-west side of Xiamen Island offers short 5-minute boat rides to the island of Gulangyu, this ferry is only accessible by Xiamen residents. Tourists and non-locals must now take a longer 20-minute ferry ride from the main International Ferry Terminal, also called the Dongdu International Terminal, on the south-west side of Xiamen Island, as of 20 October 2014 with a fare increase from 8RMB to 35RMB. The purpose was to reduce the number of tourists accessing the island in an effort to conserve it. This terminal used to have ferries, taking 90 minutes, to Kinmen Island but were ceased in 2014.

==== Port ====
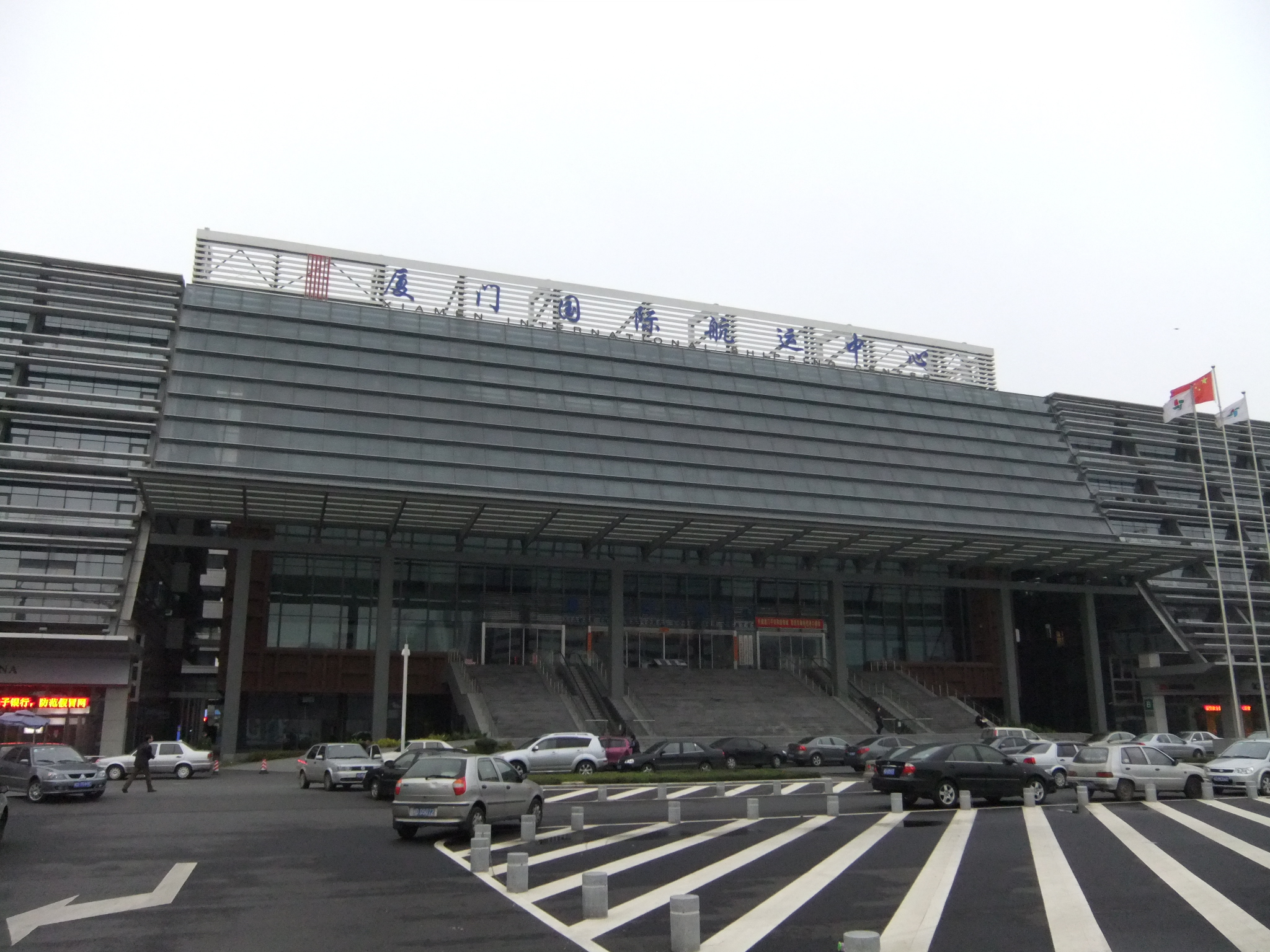
The headquarters of the Xiamen Port administration.

The historic port of Xiamen in Yundang Bay on the southwest side of Xiamen Island has been converted into a lake by land reclamation projects.

The present-day Port of Xiamen lies on the northwestern shore of Xiamen Island, opposite its airport, and at eleven other sites around Xiamen Bay and along the Jiulong estuary, including the neighboring jurisdiction of Zhangzhou. The port facilities are interconnected by ship, road, and rail. The port has been one of the busiest in China since the early 1980s and is serviced by all of the 20 largest shipping lines in the world. In 2025, Xiamen ranked among the top 15 ports in the world for container freight.

The natural coastline in the port area is 64.5 kilometers (40 mi) while the water is over 12 meters (39 ft) in depth. There are 81 berths, including 16 deep-water berths, of which 6 operate containers of over 10,000 tonnes. Among other cargoes handled, Xiamen is the world's largest supply base for raw tungsten materials and sunglasses, exporting 120 million pairs each year.

Xiamen is also an important base in Fujian province for making medium-sized and large container vessels and yachts.

== Tourism ==
Xiamen and its surrounding countryside is known for its scenery and tree-lined beaches. The Xiamen's Botanical Garden is a showcase of this. The Buddhist Nanputuo Temple, dating back to the Tang dynasty, is a national treasure. Xiamen is also well known as a continuing frontline in the Chinese Civil War, with the nearby Kinmen Islands (Quemoy), Republic of China (Taiwan).The Water Garden Expo Park has a total area of about 6.76 km^{2} (2.61 sq mi), with a land area of 3.03 km^{2} or 1.17 sq mi consisting of five exhibition park islands, four ecological landscapes, islands, and two peninsulas, including the main pavilion, Chinese Education Park, Marine Culture Island, Spa Island, and other functional areas and related facilities.

=== Tourist attractions ===
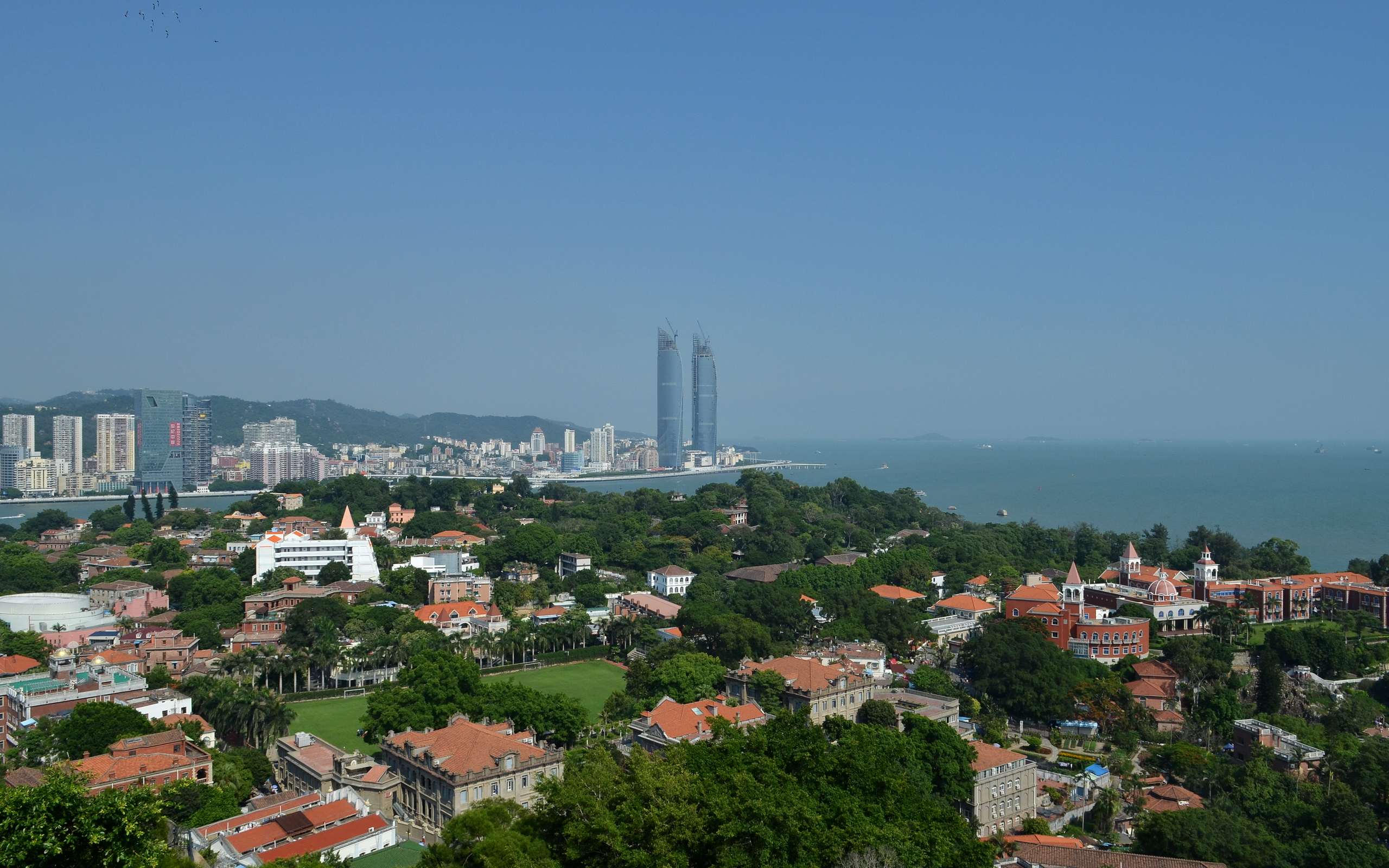
Gulangyu in the foreground

==== Gulangyu Island ====
Gulangyu, a former treaty port enclave, has views of the city and many Victorian-style buildings.

It was included on the UNESCO World Heritage list in July 2017.

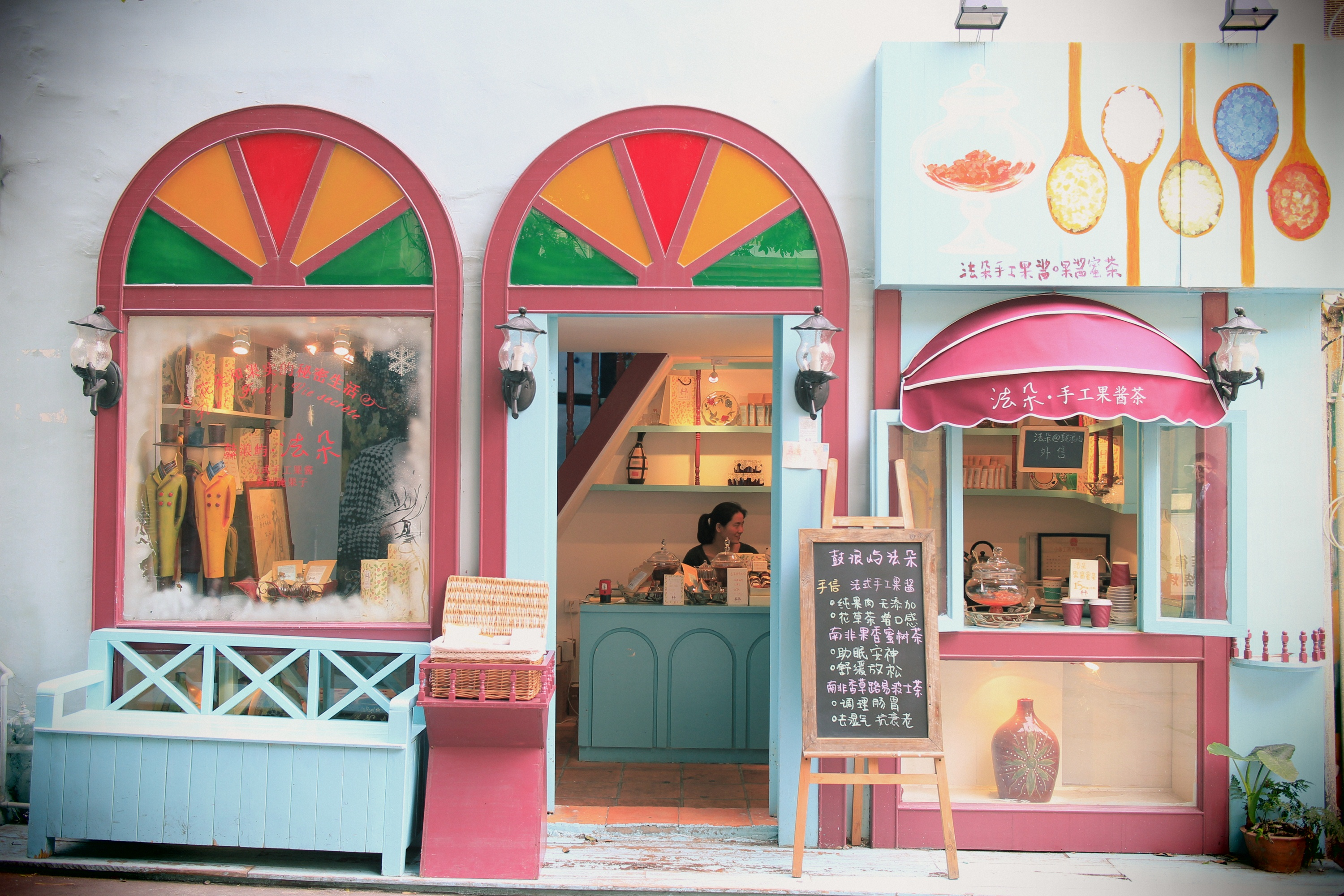
A local store on Gulangyu

==== Sunlight rock ====
Sunlight Rock (日光岩), nicknamed as Huang Rock, lies on the top of Longtou Mountain in south-central Gulangyu Island. Two rocks, leaning against each other, are the highest on the island which stand at 92.7 meters above sea level.

There is a saying that goes "if you haven't ascended Sunlight Rock, you haven't really been to Xiamen".

==== Kulangsu Historic International Settlement ====
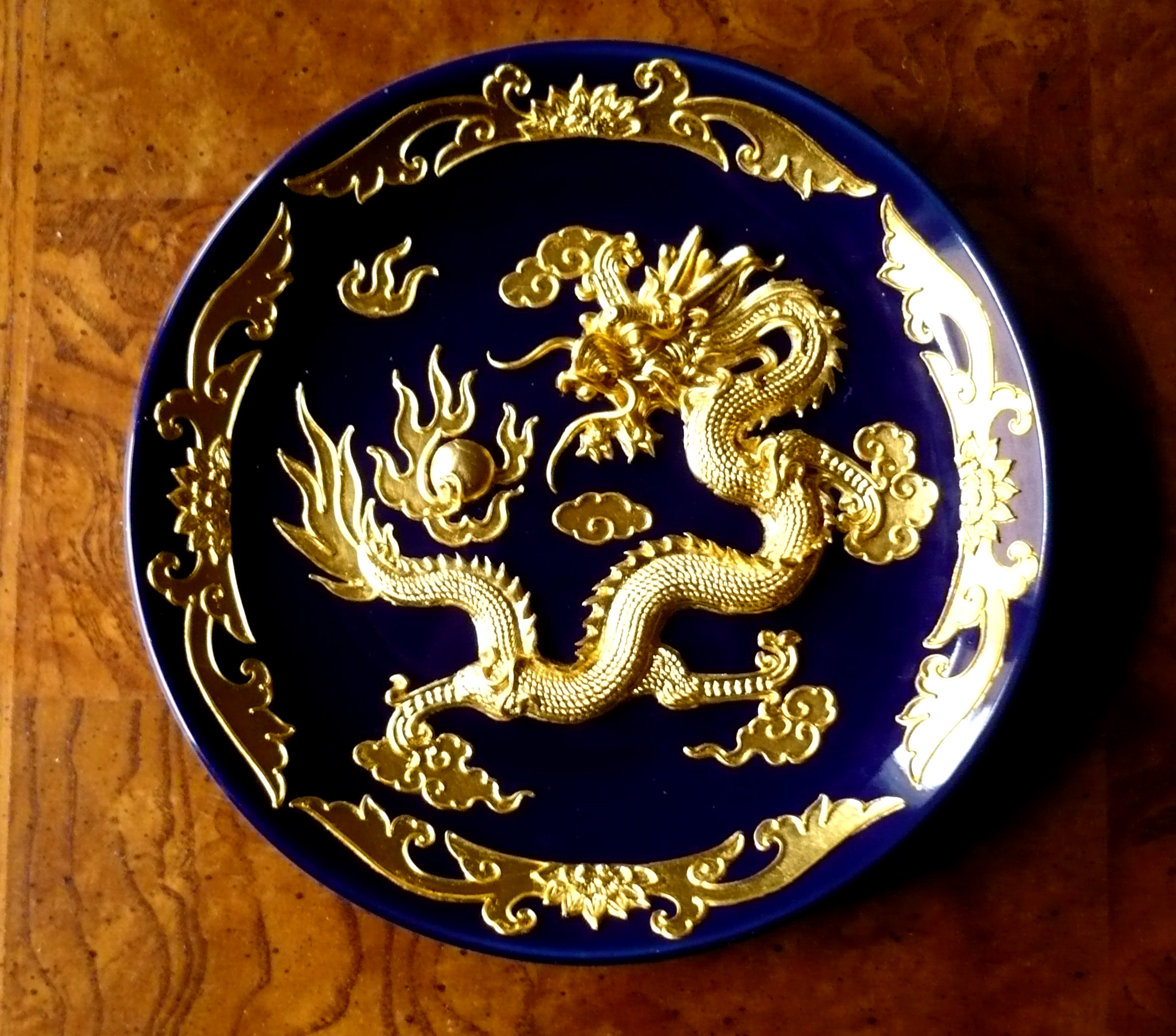
Xiamen local handicraft, gold plated lacquer ware

Kulangsu is an example of the cultural fusion that emerged from international exchanges, which remain legible in its urban fabric. Buildings here have a mixture of different architectural styles including Traditional Southern Fujian Style, Western Classical Revival Style and Veranda Colonial Style. An example of the fusion of various stylistic influences is a new architectural movement, the Amoy Deco Style, a synthesis of the Modernist style of the early 20th century and Art Deco.

==== Yundang Lake ====
Yundang Lake (筼筜湖) is originally called Yundang Harbor, which was named after a bamboo's name that have grown in forests there.

The lake, standing at the center of the new and old urban areas of Xiamen, boasts night views, which has Bailuzhou in the center of the lake, the People's Hall at the back of the lake, a large number of high buildings and footpaths along the lake banks, and illuminated bridges.

==== Hulishan Fortress ====
The Hulishan Fortress (胡里山炮台) is a concrete defensive outpost on the south side of Xiamen, just across the water from the historically contentious Kinmen Islands.

The highlight for present-day visitors is the enormous cannon that still remains (there were originally two; one for east and west defense). Built by the German munitions company Krupp, the two 14 m (46 ft) cannons, when viewed in tandem with the dozens of other, smaller artillery.

The Hulishan Fortress is located on the southern coast of Xiamen, just south of Xiamen University.

==== Zengcuoan ====
Located at Huandao Rd, Zengcuoan (曾厝垵) used to be a small fishing village near the sea. People who live by the water made their livings on the water. Gradually, many ancient houses with red bricks were established one after another and small alleys came into being.

==== Shapowei ====
Hidden in the downtown, with docks and low houses, Shapowei (沙坡尾) entails the scene of the old Xiamen. The stone road baptized by the time and the rusty wharf both witness the growth of several generations of Xiamen people.

The flavor of old Xiamen has become the reason why young people with artistic talents like to go to Shapowei. In the past, there were many small and medium-sized wharfs, but now it is a destination for food and shopping.

==== Aotou village ====
Aotou Village (澳头村), located in the Xindian town in Xiang'an district, is near the sea and mountain. It is opposite to Kinmen Island and Xiamen Island across the sea. It is not only a famous hometown of overseas Chinese in South Fujian, but also a harbor and fishing village.

==== Arcade Building ====
Just like the broad quadrangle courtyard in Beijing, and the Shikumen with Chinese and western features in Shanghai, the arcade building (骑楼) is the symbol of Xiamen's traditional culture.

Within the arcade building, the upstairs has rooms where people live while the downstairs has corridors which are used as shops.

The arcade buildings along Lujiang Ave, which are on the opposite of Gulangyu Island, enjoy a history of more than 100 years.

==== Xiamen Horticulture Expo Garden ====
The Xiamen Horticulture Expo Garden (园林博览苑) is located in Xinglin Bay in Jimei district, Xiamen, Fujian province.

The park covers a total area of about 10 square kilometers, with land and water landscapes accounting for half of the total area.

As the venue for the sixth China International Garden and Flower Exposition, the park enjoys a natural and environmentally-friendly layout. It consists of nine islands and various gardens with different styles.

It serves as a venue for horticultural exhibitions, tourism, recreational activities, and educational activities for the public.

==== Chengyi Discovery Center ====
Themed on aerospace, navigation, natural disasters and information communication, Chengyi Discovery Center (诚毅科探中心) has seven exhibition areas, including dream seeking, space exploration, aeronautical laboratory, and navigation laboratory.

The center has five initiative key exhibition projects in China, including two special cinemas of X-Flight space exploration and pleasant trip, Tiangong-1, a huge slide, and light show. Besides, theme restaurants, coffee bar and shopping mall are available here. All these elements make the center China's first indoor large-scale science themed park.

=== Museums ===
==== Xiamen Museum ====
Founded in 1983, Xiamen Museum (厦门博物馆) was located in Gulangyu Island, the most renowned scenic spot in the city, and was relocated to the Xiamen Culture and Arts Center in Siming district in 2007.

Covering 25,300 square meters, the new museum is six times larger than the original, and displays 30,000 pieces of cultural relics, mostly featuring porcelain, paintings, calligraphy works, jades, and stone carvings.

==== Tan Kah Kee Memorial Museum ====
Tan Kah Kee Memorial (陈嘉庚纪念馆) Museum is a museum to memorialize social and historic celebrities. Its building inherits unique southern Fujian features, which integrate with Jimei Aoyuan Park and Kah Kee Park, forming a tourist destination.

As holder of the cultural memorials of Tan Kah Kee (a well-known patriotic overseas Chinese leader), the museum is also an important patriotic education base in Xiamen.

==== Overseas Chinese Museum ====
Founded by Tan Kah Kee, an entrepreneur whose ancestral home is in Xiamen, the Overseas Chinese Museum (华侨博物院) shows the history of Chinese people living outside their home country, integrating collections of cultural relics, exhibitions and academic research.

By March 2017, the museum was displaying more than 1,200 photos, 2,000 cultural relics and 1,000 specimens of rare birds, animals and marine creatures.

==== Gulangyu Piano Museum ====
Gulangyu Island, listed as a world cultural heritage site in 2017, is also dubbed the Island of Pianos because more than 100 musical families once lived in the 1.87-square kilometer area.

The Piano Museum (鼓浪屿钢琴博物馆) exhibits more than 40 old pianos donated by the pianist Hu Youyi, including a gilded piano, a piano with four corners, the earliest one in the world, and a mechanical piano operated by pumping pedals.

==== Xiamen Olympic Museum ====
Xiamen Olympic Museum (厦门奥林匹克博物馆) is the first Olympic-themed museum in China approved by the International Olympic Committee and Chinese Olympic Committee. It houses a collection of Olympic-related relics.

==== Oriental Fish Bone Gallery ====
The Oriental Fish Bone Gallery (东方鱼骨博物馆) in Xiamen, Fujian province was founded by Chinese artist Lin Hanbing in April 2006 and is the first of its kind anywhere in the world.

Lin creates artworks by arranging raw materials, commonly food waste such as fish bones, fins, scales, eyes, shrimp antennae and crab shells, through 12 processing steps including separating bones and meat, washing, removing the fishy flavor, whitening, applying mildew proof, and dehydrating.

The raw materials, due to their various shapes and colors, are arranged by Lin into realistic paintings like flowers, birds and beasts, as well as abstract artworks imbued with a deeper meaning.

In recent years, Lin has changed his style from original landscape paintings to artwork that reflects environmental problems, including air, river, and sea pollution.

==== Museum of 'incessant' Xiamen memories ====
The museum (不辍旧物馆) at No 122 Minzu Rd in Xiamen, Fujian province, is home to a variety of old gadgets that hold the memories of the coastal city. Chen Zhaowei, the 48-year-old native Xiamen curator, said the museum is inspired by and named for The Analects of Confucius and means 'incessant' in Chinese.

== Culture ==
Xiamen is known for its music, puppet shows, Gezai Opera, and temple celebration events.

=== Folk customs ===
==== Gongfu tea ====
Xiamen is one of the origins of gongfu (kung fu) tea ceremony with a profound tea culture. The essence of Xiamen tea culture is tea ceremony, which involves five elements: tea leaves, water, tea set, fire and environment. Xiamen people mostly drink Oolong tea and especially love Anxi Tieguanyin, which is known as the highest grade of tea.

Xiamen people usually start their day by making a cup of kungfu tea.

==== Jianggu ====
Jianggu (讲古场) is a kind of storytelling in Minnan (southern Fujian province) dialect and can be seen in Minnan, Taiwan and Chinese inhabited areas in Southeast Asia.

The performer usually tells stories with vivid and funny slang, proverbs or doggerel, using a dramatic tone, strong facial expressions and body language to attract the audience. It is a popular traditional Chinese folk entertainment performance.

==== Mid-Autumn mooncake gambling ====
Mid-Autumn mooncake gambling (中秋博饼), betting on moon cakes, is a folk game played around the Mid-Autumn Festival. It originated in Xiamen and then traveled to the neighboring Zhangzhou, Quanzhou and Kinmen (Quemoy).

It is a game played with six dice. Just throw the dice into a bowl and the different pips you get stand for different ranks of awards you will win.

The gambling game has six ranks of awards, which were given the names of winners in ancient imperial examinations: zhuangyuan, bangyan, tanhua, jinshi, juren and xiucai.These are also known as "One Show", "Two Lifts", and "Three Reds".

==== Sending off the Wang Boat ====
The celebration called "Song Wang Chuan" (送王船) is a very important and longstanding traditional festival held in coastal villages in Fujian province, Taiwan and oversea Minnan communities to avert calamities and pray for divine blessings.

Also known as "Shao Wang Chuan" (烧王船) or "Ji Wang Chuan" (祭王船), this festival originated from a religious tradition that ancient voyagers released little boats or decorated ships to send off calamities or plague while invoking for the blessings of various Wang Ye like Zheng Chenggong, an admiral of the Ming dynasty (1368–1644) and the Taoist ritual "Hai Jiao". During the celebration, the local community would also incorporate a variety of folk performances into the traditional religious festival.

The custom was spread to Taiwan and oversea Minnan communities through boats traveling there, migration and religious exchange activities. It demonstrates the Minnan (southern Fujian) people's respect for the ocean, life, peace and justice, as well as their sympathy for vulnerable groups.

=== Cuisine ===
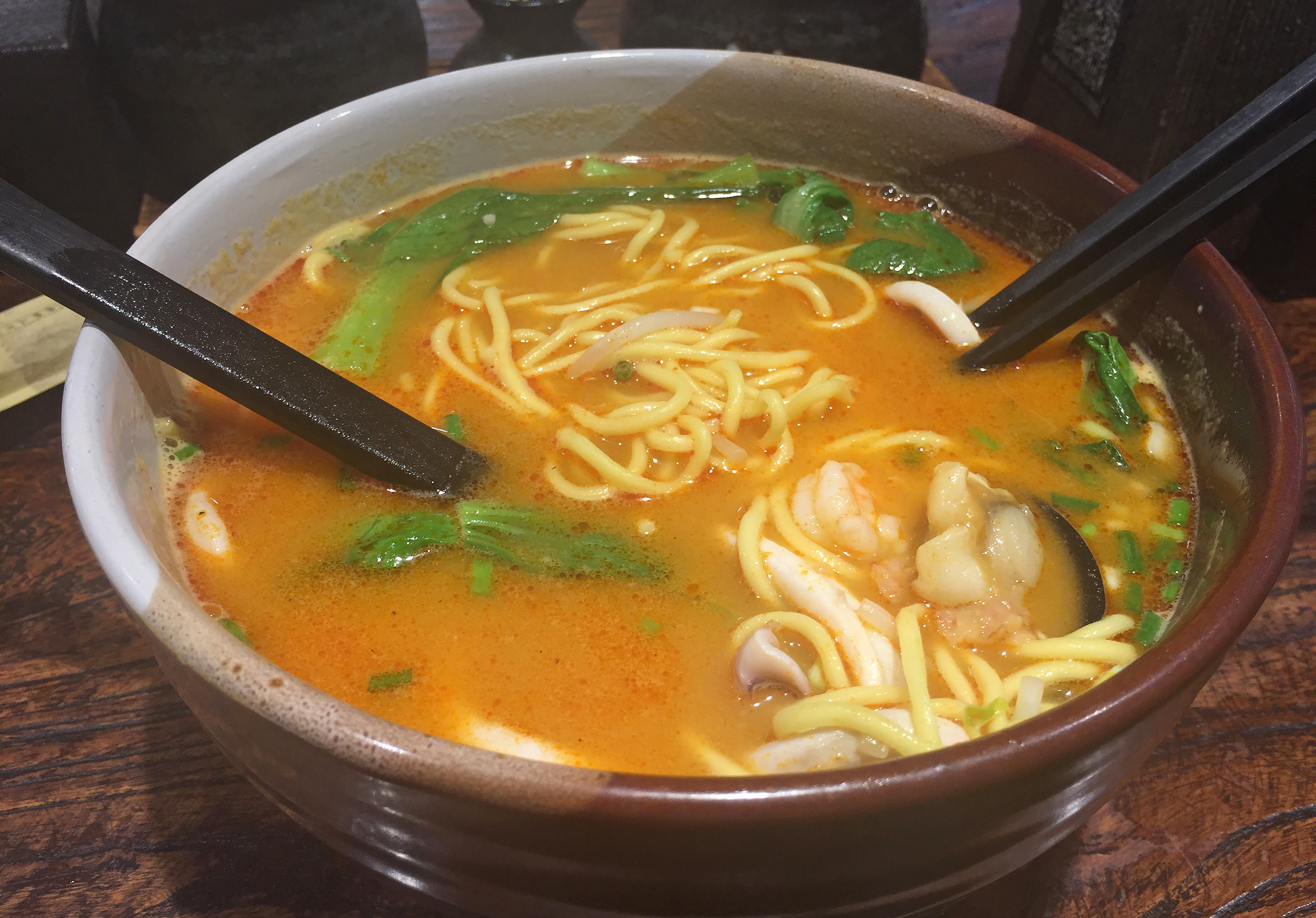
Satay noodles

As with much of southern China, the staple foods of Xiamen have long been rice, seafood, pork, sweet potatoes, various pickled vegetables, and bok choy. Its traditional dishes form a branch of southern Fujianese cuisine, with Taiwanese influence. It is particularly well known within China for its street food and snacks. A local specialty is worm jelly (t 土笋凍, s 土笋冻, tǔsǔndòng), a gelatin made from a kind of marine peanut worm.

- Satay (shacha) noodles (沙茶面) are a street food using the spicy flavor of satay, and are sold inexpensively.
- Oyster omelets (海蛎煎): Local residents are known to accompany this dish with porridge. Blend fresh oysters, sweet potato, starch and egg, then add a tablespoon of soy sauce and fry them in a pan with shallow oil until the oysters turn crispy.
- Misua paste (面线糊): The main ingredients used for making misua paste are misua, coagulated pig blood, onion oil and seafood. All of the required ingredients are boiled together into a misua paste, which includes a tender glutinous misua noodle and a smooth taste.
- Steamed taro buns (芋包): For the older generations in Xiamen, steamed Taro Buns are an essential part of Spring Festival, similar to turkey on Thanksgiving Day. Local residents usually eat it with sweet chili sauce or barbeque sauce.
- Tong'an wrapped pork (同安封肉): This dish is a local cuisine with typical Xiamen flavor, involving braised pork and condiments such as black mushroom, lotus seeds, shrimps, dried oyster.
- Ginger duck (姜母鸭): Local ducks and aged gingers are the main ingredients. Instead of being cooked over fire, the spiced duck can also be braised in sand, which is good for maintaining temperature.

=== Music ===
Musicians who hail from Xiamen and Gulangyu Island include Huang Yujun, Yin Chengzong, Jing Yang, and Xu Feiping. It has a major symphony orchestra, the Xiamen Philharmonic Orchestra. Every May there's an international music festival, and piano competitions and music festivals are also frequently held. On Gulangyu, on Huangyan Road on the way to Sunlight Rock is the Gulangyu Concert Hall, where classical concerts are regularly held on weekends. And Xiamen has a strong music atmosphere, especially Gulangyu Island (such as Gulangyu Piano Museum, Organ Museum, etc.). Almost every family in Xiamen has a piano or electronic keyboard, although they may not know music or use it. There are many piano competitions in Xiamen. Every summer, many domestic and foreign contestants often come to Xiamen to participate in the competition. (Xiamen International Piano Competition: an international piano competition co-organized by the Central Conservatory of Music and the Xiamen Municipal People's Government. The competition inherits the tradition of the world-renowned China International Piano Competition and aims to discover and cultivate outstanding talents in the field of piano, promote international music exchanges, and enhance Xiamen's cultural influence.)

=== Opera ===
==== Nanyin ====
Nanyin (南音), dubbed "a living fossil of music", is one of the four oldest forms of Chinese music preserved in its original state. Also called nanqu, xianguan, nanguan or nanyue, it developed from the imperial music of the Tang (618–907) and the Five Dynasties Period (906–960) and continues among people in Fujian's Quanzhou, Xiamen, Zhangzhou, as well as Hong Kong, Macao, Taiwan and Southeast Asian regions.

Nanyin Opera consists of three parts: zhitao, dapu and sanqu. It can be performed in two forms: tanchang (singing while playing a musical instrument) and qingchang (singing without playing a musical instrument).

It also preserves the ancient tradition of lineups for performances in the Han dynasty (206 BC-AD 220).

Various folk music instruments are used in nanyin, including pipa, dongxiao, erxian, sanxian, pin(qudi), nan'ai, paiban, xiangzhan, sibao, goujiao, muyu and shuangling.

==== Gaojia Opera ====
Gaojia Opera (高甲戏; or Gejia Opera, Daban) is a traditional folk art in Minnan in southern Fujian province. It is also popular in Taiwan and the Chinese expatriate communities living in Southeast Asia.

It grew out of Songjiang zhen, a folk cultural performance that emerged in the late Ming dynasty (1368–1644) and early Qing dynasty (1644–1911), developed into Hexing drama, an art form that combined literature and martial arts in the middle Qing dynasty, then absorbed the elements of various opera styles and turned in to Gaojia Opera in late Qing dynasty.

It can be classified into three categories: court drama (daqi drama), shengdan opera (also xiufang opera) and choudan (comic role) opera, according to the repertoire.

Its qupai (the names of the tunes) belongs to nanyin, an ancient music style from East China's Fujian province. Performers sing in their native voice with a strong and high vocal tone. The role of the puppet clown, which is rare in other operas, requires good dancing skills and is very funny and interesting.

==== Gezai opera ====
Gezai Opera (歌仔戏) is the only traditional Chinese opera that became established in Minnan, in southern Fujian province, and arose from Taiwan.

It is based on Minnan gezai (ballads) and absorbs elements from Liyuan Opera, Beiguan Opera, Gaojia Opera, Peking Opera and Minju Opera.

The art form emerged in Taiwan at the beginning of last century, then spread to Minnan and then to Southeast Asia through Chinese people and foreign citizens of Chinese origin.

Gezai Opera uses a free metrical pattern, various tunes but few lyrics. There are more than 100 traditional tunes. Zasui tunes and seven-character tunes are the two main arias in Gezai Opera.

Performers in all roles sing in their real voices. Among them, kudan (woman's role) is the most distinctive style of singing. Shao Jianghai and other folk artists in Minnan created the zasui tune and promoted this traditional art.

==== Dazuigu ====
Dazuigu (答嘴鼓) is a folk comic talk and singing art popular performed in the Minnan dialect in southern Fujian province, similar to cross-talk in North China. It adopts strictly rhyming dialogue with strong linguistic rhythms, and is popular in Minnan, Taiwan and Southeast Asia.

With the help of the Minnan dialect's unique rhyme structure, the art boasts a unique rhythmic style. It uses vivid and humorous slang and proverbs in the dialect, focuses on storyline and characters, and is full of jokes.

==== Chest-clapping dance ====
The chest-clapping dance (拍胸舞) is a traditional folk dance in South Fujian which has been handed down since the Song dynasty. Shirtless and barefoot men squat and successively beat their chests, flanks, legs and palms with hands, shaking their heads happily. The rhythm and range of steps vary with the change of dancing environment and emotion. With a strong emotion, they will stamp feet repeatedly, clap chest, rib, and the whole body very red with hands; while in a comfortable mood, they will lift chests, turn over palms and twist waists as well as hips, soft and happy, which creates a kind of lively and humorous atmosphere.

The dance emphasizes the rhythm of clapping the body. On the one hand, it reflects the characteristics of the dance itself. On the other hand, it is used to coordinate group movements and create a dancing atmosphere, well preserving the rugged and simple dance style of ancient local residents.

In 2006, the chest-clapping dance was included in the first National Intangible Cultural Heritage List under the approval of the State Council.

=== Art ===
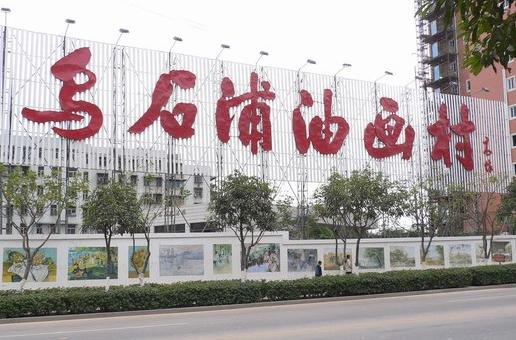
Wushipu Oil Painting Village, Xiamen

Xiamen Wushipu oil painting village has been named as "the second of the world oil painting industry base" and the second batch of national cultural (art) industry base" by the China artist association and the culture property department of Culture Ministry.

Xiamen has strong industry advantage in hand-done oil painting, which has two main manufacturing bases here, Xiamen Wushipu Oil Painting Village and Xiamen Haicang Oil Painting Village. 80% market shares in European and American market is taken up by products exported from Xiamen. As the main manufacturing base of hand painted oil painting in China, Xiamen Wushipu Oil Painting Village has more than 5,000 artists. It has the ability to produce all kinds of oil paintings with different specifications and styles. With the support of Xiamen Municipal Government, it has formed a powerful industrial chain, provided related accessories such as frames, brushes and paint colors and formed stable target customers composed by hotels, villas, high-class departments, galleries and so on. As another mail manufacturing base of oil painting, Xiamen Haicang Oil Painting Village has more than 3,000 painters. The scale of Xiamen Haicang Oil Painting Village has developed rapidly in recent years, which is from originally 28 enterprises to more than 250 enterprises at the moment. The combination of manufacturing, sales and distribution makes it become industrial base of commercial oil painting.

==== Lacquer thread sculpture ====
Lacquer thread sculpture (漆线雕) is a traditional artware in East China which uses well-tempered lacquer threads to build decorative patterns.

The main material of lacquer thread sculpture is the mixture of lacquer, the special brick powder and boiled tung oil. After beating the mixture and twisting it into a string, the craftsmen coil, entangle, pile, carve and engrave on the sculpture which is then coated with primer.

The technique's development depended on flourishing folk religions and the Buddhist sculpture tradition. As a legacy of the color sculpture of the Tang dynasty (618–907), it was inspired by the thread sculpture technology of the Song and Yuan dynasties (960–1368), especially the process of leaching powder and clay thread sculpture.

The lacquer thread sculpture technique was formed in the late Ming and early Qing dynasties (1368–1911). It has four major steps: sculpture, foundation coating, lacquer thread decoration and gilding the surface. It focuses on the aesthetic characteristics of the lacquer thread itself, and demonstrates the evolution of the use of line in Chinese arts and crafts.

==== Bead embroidery ====
The bead embroidery (珠绣) in Xiamen has small pearls, glass beads and jewels embroidered on the cloth, creating the shining glory, colorful decorations, clear layout and a strong sense of art with stereoscopic impression.

The craftsmanship has a history of nearly 100 years. In the 1970s and 1980s, the art reached its peak in popularity and many kinds of bead embroidery products were exported to over 50 countries and regions in Asia, Europe and America. In 2007, the art was included in the Fujian Provincial Intangible Cultural Heritage List.

=== Religion ===
==== Nanputuo Temple ====
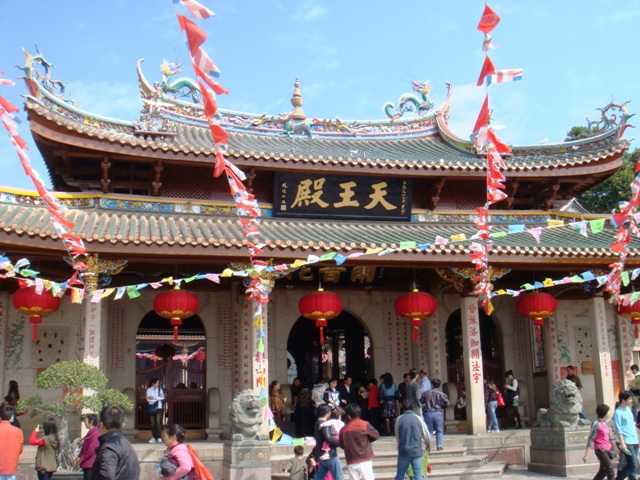
Nanputuo Temple

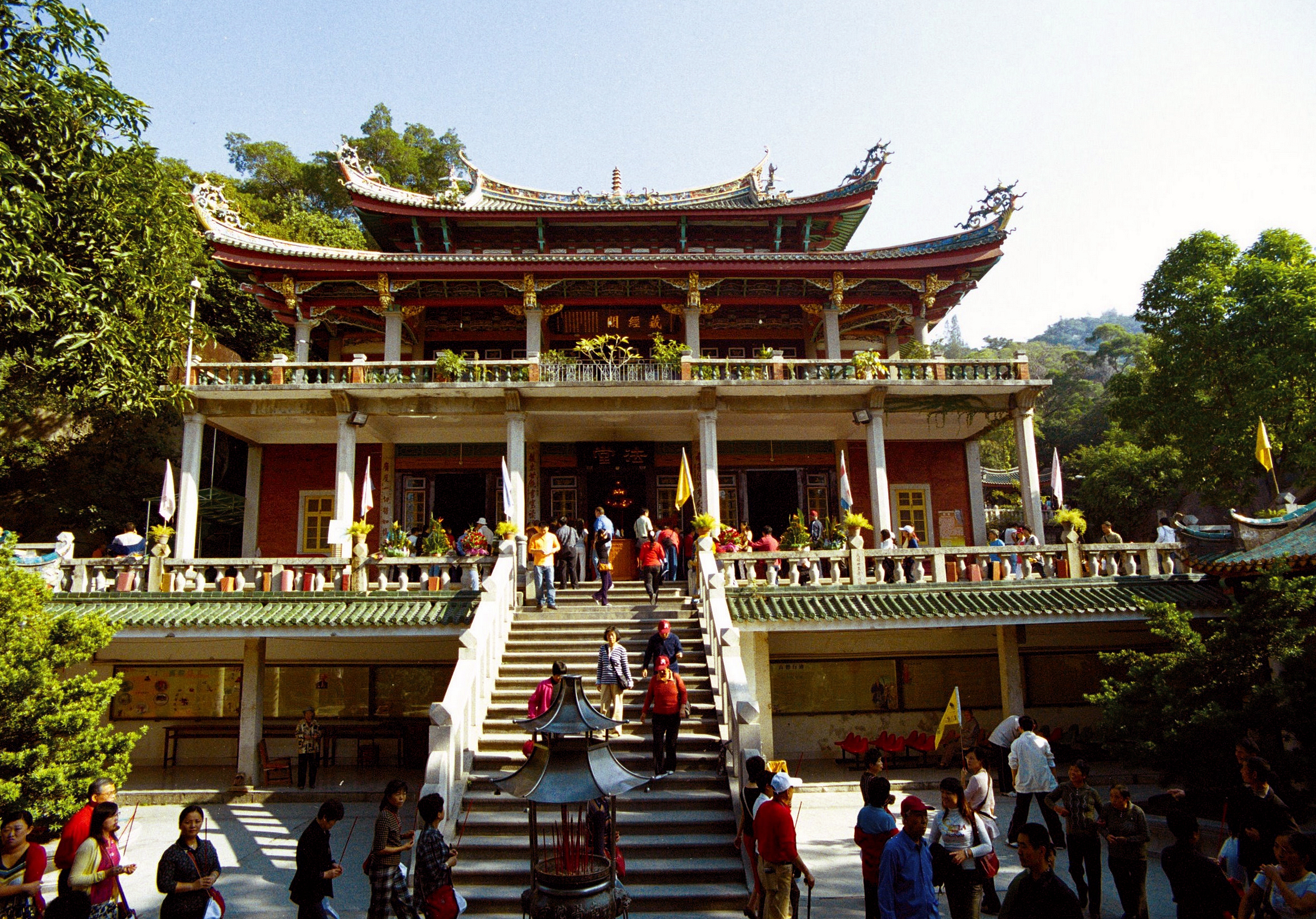
Buddhist library, Nanputuo Temple

Like most of the temples in the PRC, Nanputuo Temple (南普陀寺) has endured its share of violence and destruction during the disastrous cultural revolution. The temple's original construction was built more than a millennium ago, then it was destroyed and later rebuilt during the Tang dynasty, the temple was rebuilt and expanded by general Shi Lang during early Qing dynasty. The temple was named after the Buddhist sacred site Mount Putuo of Zhejiang Province, which is considered the abode of Guanyin Bodhisattva. The first elected abbot of the temple, Master Hui Quan set up Minnan Buddhist College in 1925. During cultural revolution, the temple was severely damaged and converted into a factory. After the cultural revolution, the status of the temple was finally reinstated and renovated in the 1980s.

The temple consists of four separate halls of worship, monks quarters and well maintained grounds by temple standatds. Stone carvings, lotus filled ponds and secluded caves are scattered around the grounds. If someone wants good luck, they would toss a coin on a rock behind the temple. Behind the smoky courtyards, libraries, monk's digs, temples and statues of laughing Buddha Milefo is Wulao Feng, "the peak of five old men", which overlooks the South China Sea, offering a view of Xiamen University campus and the urban metropolis of Xiamen.

Take a bus or cab to the temple which sits very close to Xiamen University on Siming Nanlu. The temple and the university gates are within 100 meters of each other.

==== Brahma Temple ====
Brahma Temple (梵天寺) is located at the southern foot of Dalun Mountain (大轮山), which was established in the first year of Kaihuang of the Sui dynasty (581). Its primitive name is Xingjiao Temple, which is one of the earliest Buddhist temples in Fujian Province. Both of Miaoshi Temple in Xiamen Island and Sunlight Rock Temple in Gulangyu Island are the branch temples.

Even though Brahma Temple has experienced many vicissitudes of life, it cultivated many eminent monks, attracted refined scholars, gathered unceasing burning incense and enjoyed a widespread reputation. The distinguished Master Hong Yi, Master Hong Choon and the Master Yin Shun who is the charismatic figure of Humanistic Buddhism in Taiwan has once stayed in the temple. There is a Brahman pagoda of the Song dynasty in the temple, which has been included in the first group of cultural relics in Fujian province.

==== Belief in Life Protection Emperor ====
Life Protection Emperor (保生大帝信仰文化), commonly referred to as "Baosheng Dadi" (保生大帝) or "Dadaogong" (大道公), "Wuzhenren" (吴真人) or "Huajiaogong" (花桥公), is the Medicinal Deity popularly worshiped by people across Southern Fujian and the Chaozhou-Jieyang-Shantou region (Teochew speaking region in Guangdong province). There are temples dedicated to the deity across the Southern China, Taiwan and Southeast Asia. Among them, the Qingjiao Tzu Chi Temple and Baijiao Tzu Chi Temple are recognized as the ancestral temples of Life Protection Emperor.

Wu Tao or Wu Ben (吳本) was born in the village of Bailiao near Xiamen in Fujian Province, during the Song dynasty in the year 979. He was a skilled doctor and Taoist practitioner who was credited with performing medical miracles, including applying eye drops to a dragon's eye and removing a foreign object from a tiger's throat. After his death in 1036, he began to be worshiped as a deity. His deified status was officially recognized by the Hongxi Emperor of the Ming dynasty who conferred on him the title of "Imperial Inspector at Heavenly Gate, Miracle Doctor of Compassion Relief, Great Taoist Immortal, and the Long-lived, Unbounded, Life Protection Emperor".

==== Belief in Lord Chi ====
Lord Chi (池王信仰文化), or Chi Ran, is an imperial official of Nanjing origin. He is very upright in disciplining himself and fulfilling his official responsibilities. It is said that in the era of Emperor Wanli of the Ming dynasty, Chi was appointed by the imperial court to be magistrate of Zhangzhou, Fujian province. He met two envoys when he passed Small Yingling Mountain, which is in present Xiang'an district. After having a good conversation with them, he knew that they were under the celestial imperial order from the Jade Emperor (the Supreme Lord of Heaven) and were instructed to spread plague among the population in Zhangzhou. Chi tried to get the poison from them and swallowed the poison immediately to prevent the plague. When he arrived at Maxiang, he was badly poisoned and his face turned black, then he died under a big banyan tree. Jade Emperor was touched by Chi's bravery and selfless sacrifice, and his love for the people as his children, so Chi was deified and titled "the Celestial Imperial Inspector representing the Heaven" (代天巡狩), and was promoted as Wang Ye or Sacred Duke.

After Koxinga took over Taiwan, the belief in Lord Chi has been transmitted to Taiwan and Southeast Asia. It has a history of over 300 years and Lord Chi has become one of the divinities (Wang Ye) worshipped in Taiwan.

==== Belief in Fude Zhengshen ====
Belief in Fude Zhengshen (福德正神信仰文化) is the belief in the God of Earth. In Chinese folk religion, the Earth Deity is also regarded as God of Wealth and Prosperity, because people believe that "land can bestowed wealth" (有土斯有財).

Every year, the second day of the second month and the fifteenth day of eighth month on the Chinese lunar calendar are regarded the birthday of the Earth Deity. Every 16th day of the 12th month of the lunar calendar is the sacrifice day of the "year-end dinner". Folk activities include the ceremony to light the first incense to invite the ruler of heaven, holding the sacrifice ceremony, sending stoves, and offering incenses to Buddha. Among these activities, meeting the deities, dancing performances, and opera performed to show gratitude for gods are all cultural events.

=== Media ===
Xiamen is served by Xiamen Media Group, which broadcasts news and entertainment such as movies and television series by AM/FM radio, close circuit television, and satellite television. Media in Xiamen were temporarily blocked by the Government in June 2007 when about 10,000 people participated in protests against the building of a paraxylene factory by Tenglong Aromatic PX (Xiamen) Co. Ltd., which is owned by Taiwanese businessman Chen Yu-hao. The incident, however, was solved smoothly later that year.

== Colleges and universities ==
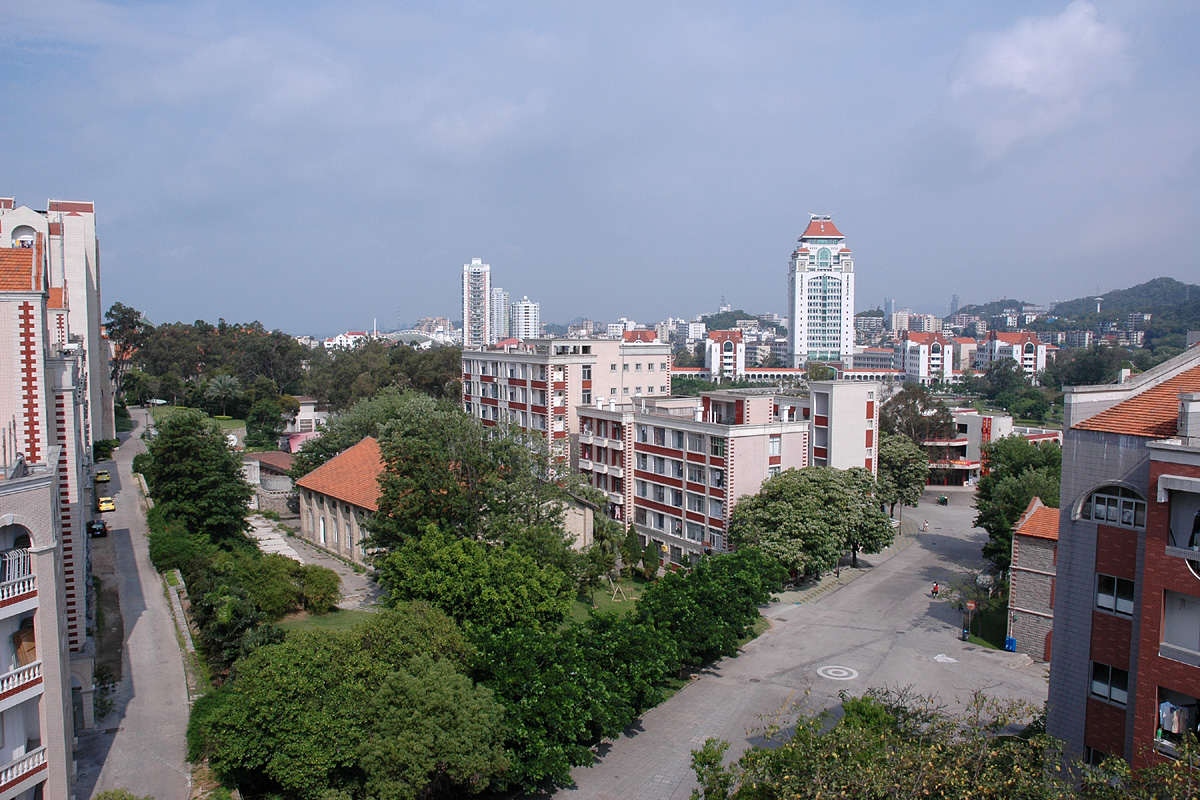
A view of the Xiamen University campus

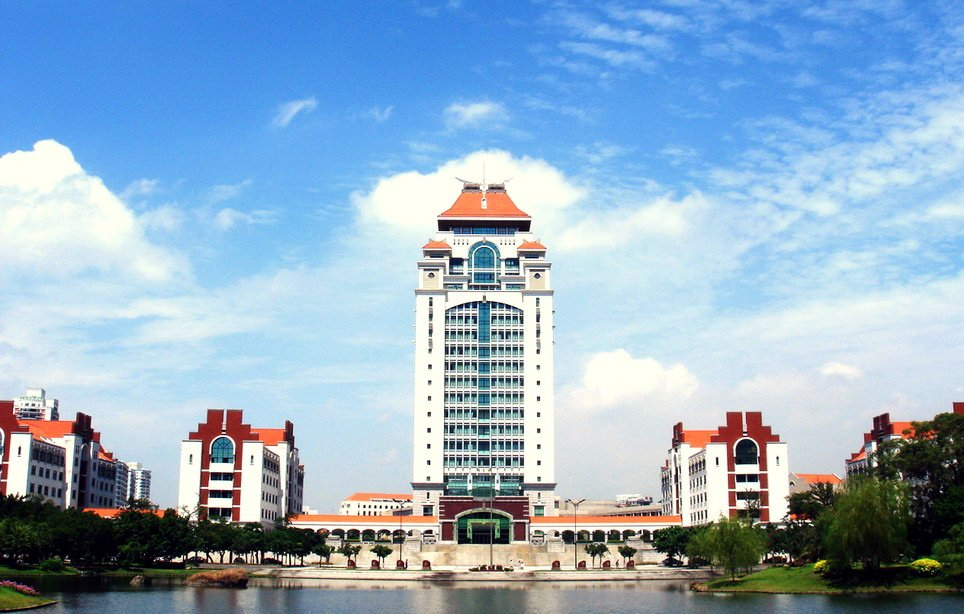
A view of the Xiamen University

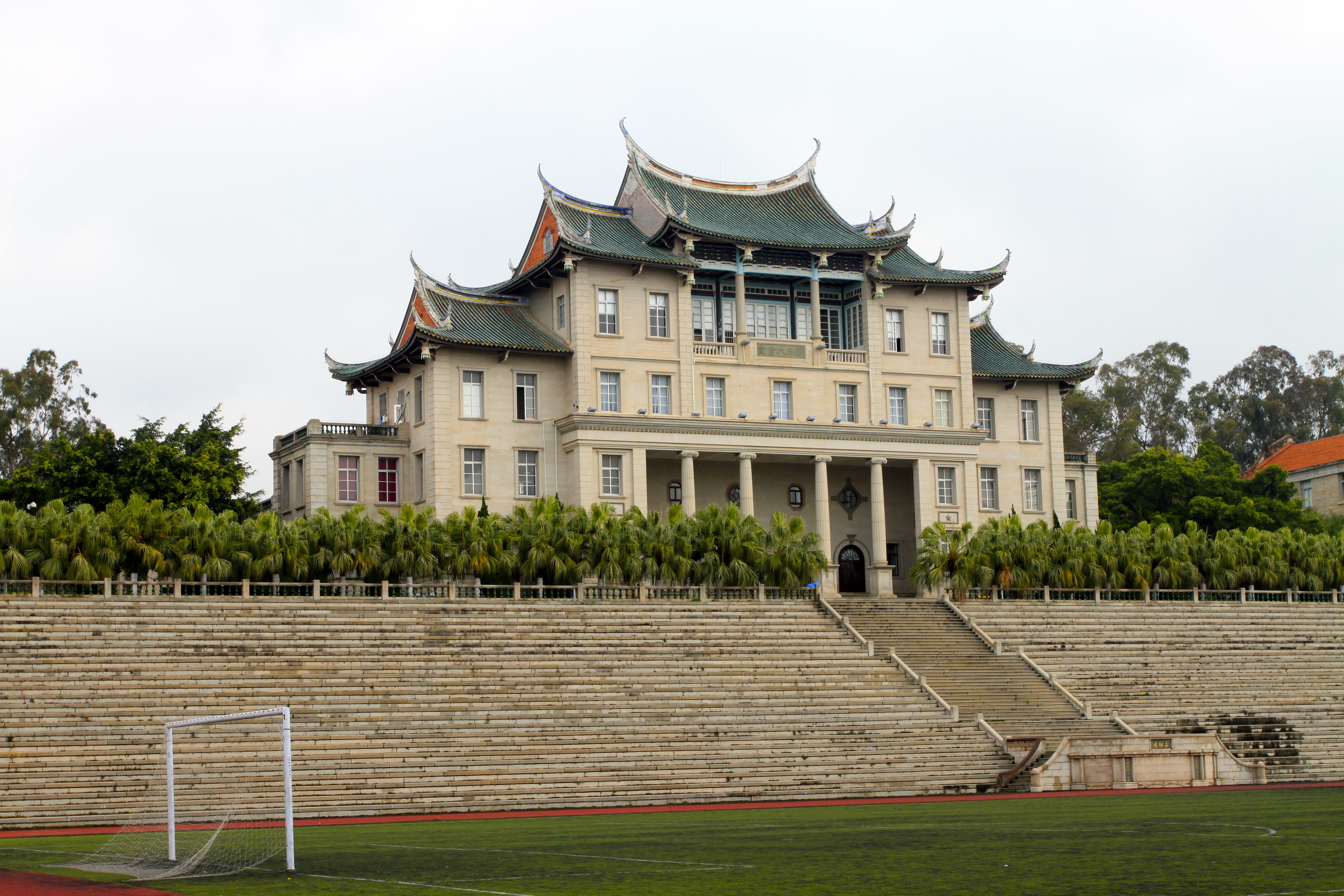
Jiannan Auditorium at Xiamen University

Xiamen is one of the top 40 cities in the world by scientific research as tracked by the Nature Index.

=== Public universities ===
The first two universities below were founded by Tan Kah Kee.

- Xiamen University (厦门大学) (founded 1921, Project 985, Project 211, powered by the Ministry of Education of the People's Republic of China): The school has cooperated with over 300 overseas universities and made substantive exchanges with 47 foreign universities that rank among the top 200 in the world. The university vigorously promotes the campaign of teaching Chinese as a foreign language worldwide by co-establishing 15 Confucius Institutes with universities in North America, Europe, and Africa.
- Jimei University (集美大学)(powered by the Fujian Provincial Department of Education): The university enrolls students from all over the country as well as from overseas; about 600 overseas students are now studying at Jimei.
- Jimei University Chengyi College (集美大学诚毅学院)(independent college)
- Huaqiao University (华侨大学): 4,627 international students from over 50 countries and regions including Hong Kong, Macao and Taiwan are now studying at Huaqiao University. The school is one of the top destinations for overseas students in China.
- Chinese Language and Culture College of Huaqiao University (华侨大学华文学院)(secondary school of Huaqiao University)
- Xiamen University of Technology (厦门理工学院): Attracting international students from more than 10 countries to study.
- Xiamen Medical College (厦门医学院): The college has established friendly cooperation ties with National Taiwan Ocean University, National Yang-Ming University, National Taipei University of Nursing and Health Sciences, Tzu Chi University of Science and Technology, Fooyin University, China University of Science and Technology, Central Taiwan University of Sciences and Technology, South Korea's Catholic University of Deagu, Gimcheon College, Daejeon University, Daegu Haany University, and Germany's Cologne University of Applied Sciences. They have conducted international cooperation in running joint schools and research programs while encouraging exchange visits of scholars.
- Xiamen Academy of Arts and Design, Fuzhou University (福州大学厦门工艺美术学院) (secondary school of Fuzhou University)

=== Private universities ===
- Xiamen Huaxia University (厦门华夏学院): The school has signed agreements with universities and colleges from the United States and Taiwan, including the University of Arkansas-Little Rock, National Taichung University of Science and Technology and Tzu Chi University of Science and Technology. They exchange teachers and students, with over 200 students having been sent to Taiwan and the US on exchange studies.
- Xiamen Institute of Technology (厦门工学院): The school upholds a constantly upgraded international vision of talent training and has carried out various forms of cooperation and exchanges with 16 universities in the United States, Canada, the United Kingdom, Taiwan and other countries and regions. A cooperation system has been developed to encourage students to learn at other schools for a certain time in the context that credits are accepted by both schools. There is another program that offers double degrees and continuous undergraduate and graduate study.

=== Public higher vocational schools ===
- Xiamen Ocean Vocational College (厦门海洋职业技术学院)
- Xiamen City University (厦门城市职业学院): The school has admitted a total of 193 overseas students from nine countries. It has also set up a subsidiary college, known as the International Vocational Education College, and has cooperated with universities from the US, Canada, Japan and other countries to cultivate professional talent with an international vision and a "craftsman's spirit".
- Jimei Industrial College (集美工业职业学院)

=== Private higher vocational schools ===
- Xiamen Huatian International Vocational Institute (厦门华天涉外职业技术学院): The college has been actively expanding international cooperation, enjoying partnerships with Hosan University and Catholic University in South Korea. The school also reached cooperative intentions with four US universities, including the South Seattle Community College, and the Victoria University of Wellington in New Zealand.
- The Xiamen Academy For Performing Arts (厦门演艺职业学院): The school emphasizes cultural and artistic exchanges between Fujian and Taiwan, and built a long-term tie with a Taiwan vocational college in 2010. It also uses the favorable location of Xiamen to invite prestigious artists and arts groups from Taiwan to give lectures and conduct academic exchanges.
- Xiamen Xingcai Vocational & Technical College (厦门兴才职业技术学院)
- Xiamen Institute of Software Technology (厦门软件职业技术学院): The school cooperates with top universities such as Deakin University in Australia, Dublin Business School in Ireland, University of Central Lancashire in the United Kingdom and Feng Chia University in Taiwan on academic exchanges and scientific research.
- Xiamen Nanyang University (厦门南洋职业学院): The school maintains cooperative relationships with colleges and universities from the United States, Canada, Singapore and Taiwan, and is gearing up to enhance mutual exchanges and promote Xiamen to a wider international audience.
- Xiamen Donghai Institute (厦门东海职业技术学院): To advance its international exchange and cooperation, the institute set up an international school in December 2017, and built partnerships with South Korea's Daegu University, Sangmyung University, Hosan University and the Wesleyan University in the United States.
- Xiamen Security Science And Technology College (厦门安防科技职业学院): The college has been dedicated to international education since 2017 with the aim of improving the quality of its education. It gained qualification to recruit overseas students after receiving approval from senior administration. At present, it has recruited a number of overseas students from the United Kingdom, Turkey, India and other countries.

=== Continuing education ===
- Xiamen National Accounting Institute (厦门国家会计学院)
- Third Institute of Oceanography, Ministry of Natural Resources, PRC (自然资源部第三海洋研究所)
- The Institute of Urban Environment (IUE), Chinese Academy of Sciences (CAS) (中国科学院城市环境研究所)
- Haixi Institutes, Chinese Academy of Sciences, Xiamen Institute of Rare Earth Materials (中国科学院-海西研究院 厦门稀土材料研究所)
- Xiamen Southern Oceanographic Center (厦门南方海洋研究中心)
- Xiamen Institute of Marine Seismology, China Earthquake Administration (中国地震局厦门海洋地震研究所)
- Xiamen Data Intelligence Academy of ICT (The Institute of Computing Technology), CAS (Chinese Academy of Sciences) (中国科学院计算技术研究所厦门数据智能研究院)
- Southern Base, First Research Institute of the Ministry of Public Security OF PRC (公安部第一研究所南方技术基地)
- Xiamen Base, Institute of Hydrogeology and Environmental Geology, CAGS (中国地质科学院水文地质环境地质研究所厦门基地)

=== Non-degree higher learning institutions ===
- Xiamen Far East Training Institute (厦门远东专修学院)
- Xiamen College of Science and Technology (厦门科技专修学院)

== Military ==
Xiamen functions as the headquarters of the 73rd Group Army of the People's Liberation Army, one of the three group armies under then Nanjing Military Region, now the Eastern Theater Command which is responsible for the defense of the eastern China, including any military action in the Taiwan Strait.

== Notable people ==
- Lucio Tan, CEO of Philippine Airlines
- Lua Chiong Seng, businessman
- Raymond Lam, TVB actor and singer who was born in Xiamen
- Rosina Lam, actress who was born in Xiamen
- Un Seng Chong, or Yin Chengzong, a pianist and composer born in Xiamen
- Henry Sy Sr., businessman, founder of SM Group and chairman of SM Prime Holdings
- Tan Kah Kee, businessman, community leader, and philanthropist in colonial Singapore, and a Communist leader in the People's Republic of China.
- Lin Qiaozhi, obstetrician and gynecologist born in Gulangyu, Xiamen
- Walter Houser Brattain, American inventor of the transistor; co-recipient of 1956 Nobel Prize in Physics.
- Han Kuo-Huang, ethnomusicologist and musician born in Xiamen
- Lin Yutang, Hokkien Republic of China writer, translator, linguist, philosopher and inventor
- Lu Jiaxi, or Chia-Si Lu, physical chemist born in Xiamen
- Robert Lim, or Lin Kesheng, Lim-Kho-seng, physiologist who taught at Xiamen University
- Chen Duling, actress
- Tong Zhe, educator and organization founder
- Zhong Nanshan, a Chinese medical scientist and professor born in Xiamen. 2020, Academician Zhong Nanshan served as the leader of a senior expert group of the National Health Commission of the People's Republic of China to conduct research and investigation into the COVID-19 disease outbreak in wuhan.

== International relations ==
=== Consulates ===
Singapore, Philippines and Thailand maintain consulates in Xiamen.

=== Sister cities ===
- Cardiff, Wales (1983-3-31)
- Sasebo, Nagasaki, Japan (1983-10-28)
- Cebu City, Philippines (1984-10-26)
- Baltimore, Maryland, US (1985-11-7)
- Wellington, New Zealand (1987-6-23)
- George Town, Penang, Malaysia (1993-11-10)
- Sunshine Coast, Australia (1999-9-28)
- Kaunas, Lithuania (2001-3-11)
- Guadalajara, Mexico (2003-8-15)
- Zoetermeer, Netherlands (2005-7-14)
- Surabaya, Indonesia (2006-6-23)
- Mokpo, South Jeolla, South Korea (2007-7-25)
- Sarasota, Florida, US (2007-11-9) (Sister City of Siming District)
- Marathon, Greece (2009-1-2)
- Trier, Rhineland-Palatinate, Germany (2010-11-11)
- Richmond, British Columbia, Canada (2012-4-27)
- Dushanbe, Tajikistan (2013-6-20)
- Nice, France (2014-5-22)
- Phuket, Thailand (2017-5-11)
- İzmir, Turkey (2018-1-18)
- Netanya, Israel (2022-1-18)
- Fortaleza, Ceará, Brazil (2023-5-12)
- Durban, KwaZulu-Natal, South Africa (2023-9-19)
- Belgrade, (2025-9-8)

=== Friendly exchange cities ===
- Ginowan, Okinawa, Japan (1995-11-20)
- Pyeongtaek, Gyeonggi Province, South Korea (2002-8-27)
- Gwangyang, South Jeolla Province, South Korea (2007-11-22)
- Las Palmas de Gran Canaria, Spain (2008-7-18)
- Miami, Florida, US (2010-11-12)
- Słupsk, Poland (2011-9-8)
- Negeri Sembilan, including Kelang, Malaysia (2011-10-18)
- Markham, Ontario, Canada (2012-7-22)
- Vladivostok, Primorsky Krai, Russia (2013-4-23)
- Foz do Iguaçu, Paraná, Brazil (2013-9-11)
- Narva, Ida-Viru, Estonia (2015-10-20) (Friendly exchange city of Tong'an District)
- Pécs, Baranya, Hungary (2017-5-25) (Friendly exchange city of Haicang District)
- Santiago Metropolitan Region, Chile (2022-4-6)
- Abidjan, Ivory Coast (2022-7-25)
- Metapán, Santa Ana Department, El Salvador (2023-7-26)
- Bishkek, Kyrgyzstan (2023-9-9)
- Belgrade, Serbia (2024-5-13)
- Champasak province, Laos (2024-8-16)
- Preah Sihanouk province, Cambodia (2024-8-19)

=== Sister ports ===
- Port of Baltimore, US (2002-3-1)
- Port of Duisburg, Germany (2004-4-29)
- Port of Chornomorsk, Ukraine (2005-1-26)
- Port of Las Palmas, Spain (2005-3-25)
- Mokpo Newport, South Korea (2006-9-6)
- Port of Pyeongtaek-Dangjin, South Korea (2008-9-10)
- Port of Gwangyang, South Korea (2008-12-10)
- Port Everglades, US (2007-9-20)
- Port of Zeebrugge, Belgium (2012-9-18)
- Port Klang, Malaysia (2015-10-28)
- PortMiami, US (2016-8-29)
- Port of Cork, Ireland (2017-7-17)
- Flinders Ports of South Australia, Australia (2017-7-22)
- Port San Antonio, Chile (2019-3-8)
- Port of Busan, South Korea (2019-8-20)
- Autonomous Port of Abidjan, Ivory Coast (2022- – )
- Laem Chabang Port, Thailand (2023-3-2)
- Port of Singapore, Singapore (2023-8-1)
- Port of Long Beach, US (2024-6-12)
- Port of Valencia, Spain (2025-4-7)

=== Friendly cooperation ports ===
- Port of Penang, Malaysia
- Port of Amsterdam, the Netherlands
- Port of Buenos Aires, Argentina
- Centreport Wellington, New Zealand
- Port of Ventspils, Latvia
- Port of Barcelona, Spain
- Port of Virginia, US
- Port of Taranto, Italy
- Port of Ancona, Italy
- Port of Trieste, Italy
- Port of İzmir, Turkey
