= Line R1 (Xiamen Metro) =

Under construction railway line in Xiamen, Zhangzhou and Quanzhou, China

Overview
- Other name(s): Quanzhou-Xiamen-Zhangzhou Intercity Railway; Xiamen-Zhangzhou-Quanzhou Intercity Railway
- Status: Under construction (Quanzhou and Zhangzhou section); Approved (Xiamen section)
- Locale: Xiamen, Zhangzhou and Quanzhou, Fujian, China
- Stations: 34 (4 are reserved) ● 11 (Zhangzhou section) ● 15 (Quanzhou section) ● 8 (Xiamen section)

Service
- Type: Regional Rail, Intercity rail

Technical
- Line length: 176.04 km (109.39 mi), including: ● 51.8 km (32.2 mi) (Zhangzhou section) ● 71.15 km (44.21 mi) (Quanzhou section) ● 53 km (33 mi) (Xiamen section)
- Num of tracks: 2
- Track gauge: 1,435 mm (4 ft 8 1/2 in)
- Minimum radius: 1,500 m (0.93 mi); 1,300 m (0.81 mi) (For difficult section)
- Electrification: 25 kV AC Overhead catenary
- Operating speed: 160 km/h (99 mph) (Maximum design speed)
- Signalling: CBTC moving block
- Maximum incline: 3.0%

Line R1 or Quanzhou-Xiamen-Zhangzhou Intercity Railway is an under construction intercity railway line in Quanzhou, Zhangzhou and Xiamen, Fujian province, China. The entire line is expected to fully operational in 2030. Line R1 will be the first intercity railway line in Fujian province also is the first intercity railway in China regulated by the National Railway Administration.

It starts from Quanzhou East Station, passes through Xiamen, and ends at Zhangzhou Jintang Station. As the core rail transit project for the integration of Xiamen, Zhangzhou, and Quanzhou, Line R1 connects the three major cities: Quanzhou, Xiamen, and Zhangzhou and is a major livelihood project aimed at improving the rail transit network in southern Fujian, shortening the time and space between the three regions, and facilitating cross-city travel for residents.

== Overview ==
Among all 176.04 km (109.39 mi) runs on the line, 94.29 km (58.59 mi) runs on above ground section (accounts for 53.8%), 50.17 km (31.17 mi) runs on underground section (accounts for 28.7%) and 30.58 km (19.00 mi) runs on tunnel section (accounts for 17.5%) with total investment of 67.983 billion RMB and planned for a construction period of 5.5 years. There are all 34 stations (4 are reserved) with 14 are elevated and 16 are underground.

The planned operating hours for this line are from 5:00 to 23:00, with a total of 18 hours of operation throughout the day, with the remaining time spent on line equipment maintenance. The total daily operating pairs for initial, near, and long term, are 103 pairs/day, 146 pairs/day, and 206 pairs/day.

=== Zhangzhou section ===
The Zhangzhou section launched bidding on 21 May 2026. It's includes three civil engineering sections, with a total length of 51.8 kilometers (14.6 km (9.1 mi) runs on underground section, 7.5 km (4.7 mi) runs on tunnel section and 29.7 km (18.5 mi) runs on above ground section), connecting core urban areas such as Zhangzhou Taiwan Business Investment Zone, Longhai District, High-tech Zone, and Xiangcheng District, with 11 stations, including 1 reserved station (4 are elevated and 6 are underground) and an estimated investment of about 8.4 billion RMB. The total land and sea area of the project is 85.37 hectares, with 78.27 hectares of underground space developed, fully reflecting the concept of green and intensive development.

Construction of Zhangzhou section will be divided 3 sections. Currently, only SG1 section with estimated investment of 2.3 billion RMB is approved. SG1 section spans 21.55 km (13.39 mi) of length.

=== Quanzhou section ===
On the 3 September 2025, it was announced that the first section was reviewed and approved ahead of schedule.

Quanzhou section is divided 4 bidding sections: QSG1 to QSG4, including:

- Total construction period for QSG1 section: 1461 days
- Total construction period for QSG2 section: 1461 days
- Total construction period for QSG3 section: 1400 days
- Total construction period for QSG4 section: 1400 days

Quanzhou section is constructed by Quanzhou Intercity Railway Construction Co., Ltd. It's started online bidding on 25 May 2026. The total length of section is 71.15 km (44.21 mi), of which 20.81 kilometers are underground section. There are 13 stations, including 2 reserved stations (6 elevated and 7 are underground) with a total investment of 12.41 billion RMB. To ensure line operation, the Quanzhou section will also build one new vehicle depot, one emergency command center, and two main substations, with a total investment of 26.883 billion RMB.

=== Xiamen section ===
Xiamen section launched bidding on 21 May 2026. It starts from the Weitouwan sea area at the Quanzhou-Xiamen border, passes through Xiang'an District, Huli District, and Haicang District, and ends at Wenpu Mountain at the Xiamen-Zhangzhou border. It spans 53 km (33 mi) (27.4% of which is underground section) with 8 stations (including 1 reserved station). The project has an investment of about 11 billion RMB and is planned for a construction period of 48 months.It's divided into four major sections: the Xiang'an Airport Section, the East China Sea Crossing Section, the Island Hub Section, and the Haicang Extension Section, with a total investment of 30.32 billion RMB.

Xiamen section is divided into 4 smaller sections:

- Section 2 covers both the Quanzhou and Xiamen sections. The Quanzhou section marks the boundary between the Weitouwan Grand Bridge and the Quanxia Bridge, the Xiamen section includes the elevated section from the Quanxia Bridge boundary to Xiang'an Airport Station (excluding), and the cut-and-cover section west of Xiang'an Airport (inclusive) to Caicuo South Station to Hongqian Station to Hongxi Bridge Section elevated terminus.
- Section 3 covers the Hongxi section elevated terminus from Xiyan Station to Xigao section between Xiang'an Conversion Well and Xigao Section Island Transfer Well.
- Section 4 is the elevated starting point between the Xigao section island transfer shaft (excluding) to Zhongpu Station to Gaoqi Station to Gaoweng section island transfer shaft to Gaoweng section.
- Section 5 covers both the Xiamen and Zhangzhou sections. The Xiamen section marks the boundary between the Gaoweng Section elevated road starting point from Wengjiao Road Station to Huizuo Station (reserved) to the Xiamen-Zhangzhou Wenpushan Tunnel, while the Zhangzhou section marks the boundary between the Xiamen-Zhangzhou Wenpushan Tunnel and the open tunnel exit (including the Zhangzhou section).

In September 2025, Xiamen Intercity Railway Investment Co, Ltd. was punished by Comprehensive Law Enforcement Bureau of Xiang'an District for violating Articles 44, Paragraph 1 and 77 of the "Land Administration Law of the People's Republic of China". The punishment included:

- Confiscation of the pedestrian overpass, wall, and paved ground illegally constructed by the company on the occupied land.
- Impose a fine of 72,900 RMB.

== Stations ==
- - Reserved stations

Station name		Transfer	Distance km	Location
English (Note: This is proposal name, not officially confirmed.)	Chinese	Transfer	Distance km	Location
Quanzhoudong Railway Station	泉州东			Quanzhou Taiwanese Investment Zone, Quanzhou
Maritime Silk Road Art Park	海丝公园			Quanzhou Taiwanese Investment Zone, Quanzhou
Baisha	白沙			Quanzhou Taiwanese Investment Zone, Quanzhou
Beixing	北星			Fengze District, Quanzhou
Donghai	东海			Fengze District, Quanzhou
Jinqi	金崎			Fengze District, Quanzhou
Tonggangxi	通港西			Fengze District, Quanzhou
Fengze	丰泽			Fengze District, Quanzhou
Chidian	池店			Jinjiang City, Quanzhou
Jinjiang Airport	晋江机场	JJN		Jinjiang City, Quanzhou
SM Plaza	SM广场			Jinjiang City, Quanzhou
Science & Technology Innovation Park	科创园			Jinjiang City, Quanzhou
Anhai	安海海			Jinjiang City, Quanzhou
Shuitou	水头			Nan'an City, Quanzhou
Shijing	石井			Nan'an City, Quanzhou
Xiang'an Airport	翔安机场	XMN; 3 4		Xiang'an, Xiamen
Cailuonan	蔡厝南	3		Xiang'an, Xiamen
Hongqian	洪前	5		Xiang'an, Xiamen
Xiyan	西岩	4 7		Xiang'an, Xiamen
Zhongpu	中埔	7 9		Huli District, Xiamen
Gaoqi	高崎	1 7		Huli District, Xiamen
Wengjiao Road	翁角路	2		Haicang District, Xiamen
Huizuo	惠佐	4		Haicang District, Xiamen
Jiaojiang Road	角江路}	6		Longhai, Zhangzhou
Zini Island	紫泥岛			Longhai, Zhangzhou
Longhai	龙海			Longhai, Zhangzhou
Zhangzhou Railway Station	漳州城际			Zhangzhou High-tech Industrial Development Zone, Zhangzhou
Zhangzhou Municipal Hospital & High-tech Zone	市医院高新			Zhangzhou High-tech Industrial Development Zone, Zhangzhou
Zhangzhou Administrative Service Center	行政中心			Longwen District, Zhangzhou
People's Square	人民广场			Longwen District, Zhangzhou
Chinese Women's Volleyball Base	女排基地			Xiangcheng District, Zhangzhou
Xiyangping	西洋坪			Xiangcheng District, Zhangzhou
Xihu	西湖			Xiangcheng District, Zhangzhou
Jintang	金塘			Xiangcheng District, Zhangzhou
