= Line 4 (Xiamen Metro) =

Under construction metro line in Xiamen, China

- Line 4 train at Houxi station

Overview
- Other name: Outer Bay Ring Express Line
- Status: Trial operation
- Owner: Xiamen Metro
- Locale: Xiamen, Fujian, China
- Termini: Xiang'an Airport; Jimei Software Park North Songyu Wharf (Future)
- Stations: 12 (Xiang'an Airport section phase 1); 21 (total)

Service
- Type: Rapid transit
- System: Xiamen Metro
- Operator: Xiamen Metro
- Depot: Houxi depot

History
- Opened: 16 September 2026; 2 months ago (Trial operation)

Technical
- Line length: 44.78 km (27.83 mi) (Xiang'an Airport section phase 1); 71.23 km (44.26 mi) (total)
- Num of tracks: 2
- Track gauge: 1,435 mm (4 ft 8 1/2 in)
- Electrification: 1.5 kV DC Overhead catenary contact
- Operating speed: 120 km/h (75 mph) (Maximum design speed)

Line 4 of Xiamen Metro is an under construction metro line in Xiamen, Fujian, China. The Xiang'an Airport section is scheduled to operate in June 2026. As the fastest fully automated metro train currently operating in Xiamen, travel time from Xiamen North railway station to Xiang'an Airport will be reduced to 30 minutes.

This is the first subway line of Xiamen Metro system to adopt GoA4 automation level.

Among the distance of 44.78 km (27.83 mi) on the Phase 1; 22.48 km (13.97 mi) is an underground section, 20.95 km (13.02 mi) and 1.35 km (0.84 mi) is a transition section.

== History ==
The key engineering projects for Line 4 were announced in December 2015.

Construction began in December 2015 with an estimated total construction period of 57 months.

On the morning of 11 April 2020, the 1.36 km (0.85 mi) bridge elevated section from Caicuo to Dadeng North was completed.

On 16 April 2024, the main structure of Airport West Station of Line 3 and Line 4 were successfully topped out.

In August 2024, the rolling stock set of Line 4 officially debuted.

On 26 November 2024, Line 4 rolling stock began testing without passengers.

On 10 October 2025, Line 4 began trial operation.

From 9:30 am on 16 September 2026, Line 4 will open trial ride activity for the public along with Line 6.

== Stations ==
Service route: Runs from Jimei Software Park North to Qianwu, without stops at Xiyan. Operating hours daily from 8:00 to 20:00, with trains run on schedule within 14 minutes and 45 seconds minute intervals, throughout the day.

Section	Station name		Transfer	Distance km	Location
Section	English	Chinese	Transfer	Distance km	Location
?	Songyu Wharf	嵩屿码头			Haicang
?	Nanhai Road	南海路			Haicang
?	Linggang Xincheng	临港新城			Haicang
Phase 2	Maluan Bay South	马銮湾南			Haicang
Phase 2	Maluan Center	马銮中心	2		Haicang
Phase 2	Maluan Bay North	马銮湾北			Haicang
Phase 2	Guankou	灌口			Jimei
Phase 2	Software Park Phase 3 East	软三东			Jimei
Phase 1 (Xiang'an Airport section)	Jimei Software Park North	集美软件园北			Jimei
Phase 1 (Xiang'an Airport section)	Houxi	后溪			Jimei
Phase 1 (Xiang'an Airport section)	Xiamen North Railway Station	厦门北站	1 XKS; Xiamen BRT		Jimei
Phase 1 (Xiang'an Airport section)	Guanxun	官浔	Xiamen BRT		Tong'an
Phase 1 (Xiang'an Airport section)	Bingzhou	丙洲			Tong'an
Phase 1 (Xiang'an Airport section)	Chengchang	城场			Xiang'an
Phase 1 (Xiang'an Airport section)	Xiyan	西岩			Xiang'an
Phase 1 (Xiang'an Airport section)	Hongkeng	洪坑	3		Xiang'an
Phase 1 (Xiang'an Airport section)	Qianwu	前浯			Xiang'an
Phase 1 (Xiang'an Airport section)	Dongting	洞庭			Xiang'an
Phase 1 (Xiang'an Airport section)	Airport West	机场西	3 XMN		Xiang'an
Phase 1 (Xiang'an Airport section)	Xiang'an Airport	翔安机场	XMN		Xiang'an
Phase 1 long term planning	Airport East	机场东	XMN		Xiang'an

== Rolling stock ==
Interior of the rolling stock

In the first phase, 18 four-car train set produced by CRRC Changchun adopting GoA4 automation level will be implemented to meet the demands.

== Depot ==
Houxi Depot

Xiamen Rail Transit Line 4 has Houxi Depot as the vehicle base. The depot is located in the Phase III plot of Jimei Software Park, between Jimei Software Park North Station and Houxi Station, with a total land area of about 20.3 hectares. Its structure includes the operation warehouse, joint maintenance warehouse, material general warehouse, transportation and management center and other structures. Comprehensive development in the upper part of the depot is planned in the future。.

== Future expansions ==
Phase 2 of Line 4 has been approved, with a total investment of 10.1 billion RMB. Phase 2 consists of 5 stations, spanning 14.8 km (9.2 mi) long. It is expected to be completed in October 2028.
