= Line 6 (Xiamen Metro) =

Under construction metro line in Xiamen, China

- Line 6 train at Jiaojiang Road station

Overview
- Other name: Xiamen-Zhangzhou Rail Transit
- Status: Trial operation
- Owner: Xiamen Metro
- Locale: Xiamen and Zhangzhou, Fujian, China
- Termini: Longjiang Mingzhu; Zhaiyang Fenglin (Future)
- Stations: 30 (Xiamen section); 7 (Zhangzhou or Jiaomei section); 37 (total); 23 (Future)

Service
- Type: Rapid transit, Intercity rail
- System: Xiamen Metro
- Operator: Xiamen Metro

History
- Opened: 16 September 2026; 36 days ago (trial operation)

Technical
- Line length: 49.3 km (30.6 mi) (Xiamen section); 9.8 km (6.1 mi) (Zhangzhou or Jiaomei section); 59.27 km (36.83 mi) (total); 33.07 km (20.55 mi) (Future)
- Number of tracks: 2
- Track gauge: 1,435 mm (4 ft 8 1/2 in)
- Electrification: 1.5 kV DC Overhead catenary contact
- Operating speed: 100 km/h (62 mph) (Maximum design speed); 80 km/h (50 mph) (Maximum train speed)

Line 6 of Xiamen Metro is an under construction subway line in Xiamen and Zhangzhou, Fujian, China. The Zhangzhou (Jiaomei) section is expected to operation in the second half of 2026. This is the first intercity metro line in Fujian province.

== Overview ==
The Jimei-Tong'an section (Jimei or Jitong section) of Line 6 spanning 26.2 km (16.3 mi) with 15 underground stations is part of Line 9 Phase 1. The total cost of the winning sections is approximately 7.4 billion RMB. The Jimei section will be split off and become Line 9 (Phase 1) section in the future.

== History ==
On 2 December 2019, the Xiamen Municipal Development and Reform Commission issued approval for the feasibility study report for Line 6 of Linhua section with a total length of 18.8 km (11.7 mi) and 13 underground stations.

On 26 December 2019, the Zhangzhou (Jiaomei section) of Line 6 was commenced construction and the first shield tunneling machine "Longjiang No. 1" was launched on 20 May 2021.

On 31 December 2019, the section from Yinong (formerly Lindai West) to Huaqiao University of Linhua section was commenced construction.

On 14 March 2023, the left line of tunneling section from Jiaomei East station (formerly Shetou) to Yinong station (formerly Lindai West) spanning 1,499.875 m (0.931979 mi) was successfully connected after 15 months of construction by using shield tunneling machine "Longjiang No. 6".

On the afternoon of 6 June 2023, the last shield tunneling machine "Longjiang No.17" was successfully launched for Zhangzhou (Jiaomei) section of Line 6, marking the entry of shield tunneling construction into a sprint phase and laying a solid foundation for comprehensive shield tunneling.

At 8:50 am on 29 September 2023, the tunneling section from Jiaohai Road to Wenpu Road of Zhangzhou section spanning 772.078 m (0.479747 mi) was successfully connected.

On 31 December 2024, the left-line shield machine on the Suncuo Station to Jiageng Gymnasium Station section of line 6 was successfully launched.

On 24 March 2025, with the smooth laying of the last 25-meter track section at the Longjiang Mingzhu Station connection point, the track engineering of line 6 was successfully completed.

On 25 May 2025, the tunneling section from Suncuo Station to Jiageng Gymnasium Station spanning 923.42 m (0.57379 mi) was successfully connected.

On 27 May 2025, the main structure of the Jiatong section of Jiageng Gymnasium Station was successfully topped out. The total length of the station is 766 meters (including 340 meters in Jiatong section and 426 meters in Huabin section), making it the largest metro station under construction in Fujian.

On 20 November 2025, the Linhua section was passed the project acceptance inspection.

On 6 March 2026, the Zhangzhou (Jiaomei) section successfully passed the project engineering acceptance.

On 31 July 2026, the Zhangzhou and Linhua section of Line 6 was completed pre-operation safety assessments.

From 9:30 am on 16 September 2026, Line 6 will be opened trial ride activity for the public along with Line 4.

== Stations ==
Service route: Runs from Jiaojiang Road to Huaqiao University, without stops at Chenjing. Operating hours daily from 6:00 to 23:00 with the peak hours within 5 minutes and 30 seconds intervals. Otherwise, trains run on schedule within 9 minutes and 50 seconds intervals

Section	Station name		Transfer	Distance km	Location
Section	English	Chinese	Transfer	Distance km	Location
Zhangzhou (Jiaomei) section	Longjiang Mingzhu	龙江明珠			Longhai, Zhangzhou
Zhangzhou (Jiaomei) section	Shimei	石美			Longhai, Zhangzhou
Zhangzhou (Jiaomei) section	Jiaojiang Road	角江路			Longhai, Zhangzhou
Zhangzhou (Jiaomei) section	Jiaomei Center	角美中心			Longhai, Zhangzhou
Zhangzhou (Jiaomei) section	Wenpu Road	文圃路			Longhai, Zhangzhou
Zhangzhou (Jiaomei) section	Jiaohai Road	角海路			Longhai, Zhangzhou
Zhangzhou (Jiaomei) section	Jiaomei East	角美东			Longhai, Zhangzhou
Linhua section	Yinong	一农			Haicang, Xiamen
Linhua section	Lindai	林埭			Haicang, Xiamen
Linhua section	Dingmei	鼎美			Haicang, Xiamen
Linhua section	Maluan Center	马銮中心	2 4		Haicang, Xiamen
Linhua section	Chenjing	陈井			Jimei, Xiamen
Linhua section	Xibin	西滨			Jimei, Xiamen
Linhua section	Beitou	碑头			Jimei, Xiamen
Linhua section	Xingbin	杏滨			Jimei, Xiamen
Linhua section	Neimao	内茂			Jimei, Xiamen
Linhua section	Dongren	董任			Jimei, Xiamen
Linhua section	Guanren	官任	1		Jimei, Xiamen
Linhua section	Xinglinwan	杏林湾			Jimei, Xiamen
Linhua section	Huaqiao University	华侨大学	Xiamen BRT		Jimei, Xiamen
Jitong (Huabin) section	Suncuo	孙厝	10		Jimei, Xiamen
Jitong (Huabin) section	Jiageng Gymnasium	嘉庚体育馆	Xiamen BRT; Line 9 Phase 1		Jimei, Xiamen
Jitong (Huabin) section	Fenglin	凤林	Xiamen BRT		Jimei, Xiamen
Jitong (Jiatong) section, which will become Line 9 Phase 1 in the future.	Dong'an	东安			Jimei, Xiamen
Jitong (Jiatong) section, which will become Line 9 Phase 1 in the future.	Meifang	美峰			Tong'an, Xiamen
Jitong (Jiatong) section, which will become Line 9 Phase 1 in the future.	Hongtangtou	洪塘头			Tong'an, Xiamen
Jitong (Jiatong) section, which will become Line 9 Phase 1 in the future.	Pantu	潘涂			Tong'an, Xiamen
Jitong (Jiatong) section, which will become Line 9 Phase 1 in the future.	Guanxun	官浔	4 Xiamen BRT		Tong'an, Xiamen
Jitong (Jiatong) section, which will become Line 9 Phase 1 in the future.	Zhigu Yungu	智谷云谷	11; Xiamen BRT		Tong'an, Xiamen
Jitong (Jiatong) section, which will become Line 9 Phase 1 in the future.	Hougu	后吴			Tong'an, Xiamen
Jitong (Jiatong) section, which will become Line 9 Phase 1 in the future.	Xihu	西湖			Tong'an, Xiamen
Jitong (Jiatong) section, which will become Line 9 Phase 1 in the future.	Third Hospital	第三医院	Xiamen BRT		Tong'an, Xiamen
Jitong (Jiatong) section, which will become Line 9 Phase 1 in the future.	Duqiao	杜桥			Tong'an, Xiamen
Jitong (Jiatong) section, which will become Line 9 Phase 1 in the future.	Xiangqiao	祥桥	5		Tong'an, Xiamen
Jitong (Jiatong) section, which will become Line 9 Phase 1 in the future.	Xiaoximen	小西门			Tong'an, Xiamen
Jitong (Jiatong) section, which will become Line 9 Phase 1 in the future.	Tong'an No.1 Middle School	同安一中			Tong'an, Xiamen
Jitong (Jiatong) section, which will become Line 9 Phase 1 in the future.	Zhaiyang	寨阳			Tong'an, Xiamen
