= Line 3 (Xiamen Metro) =

Metro line in Xiamen, China

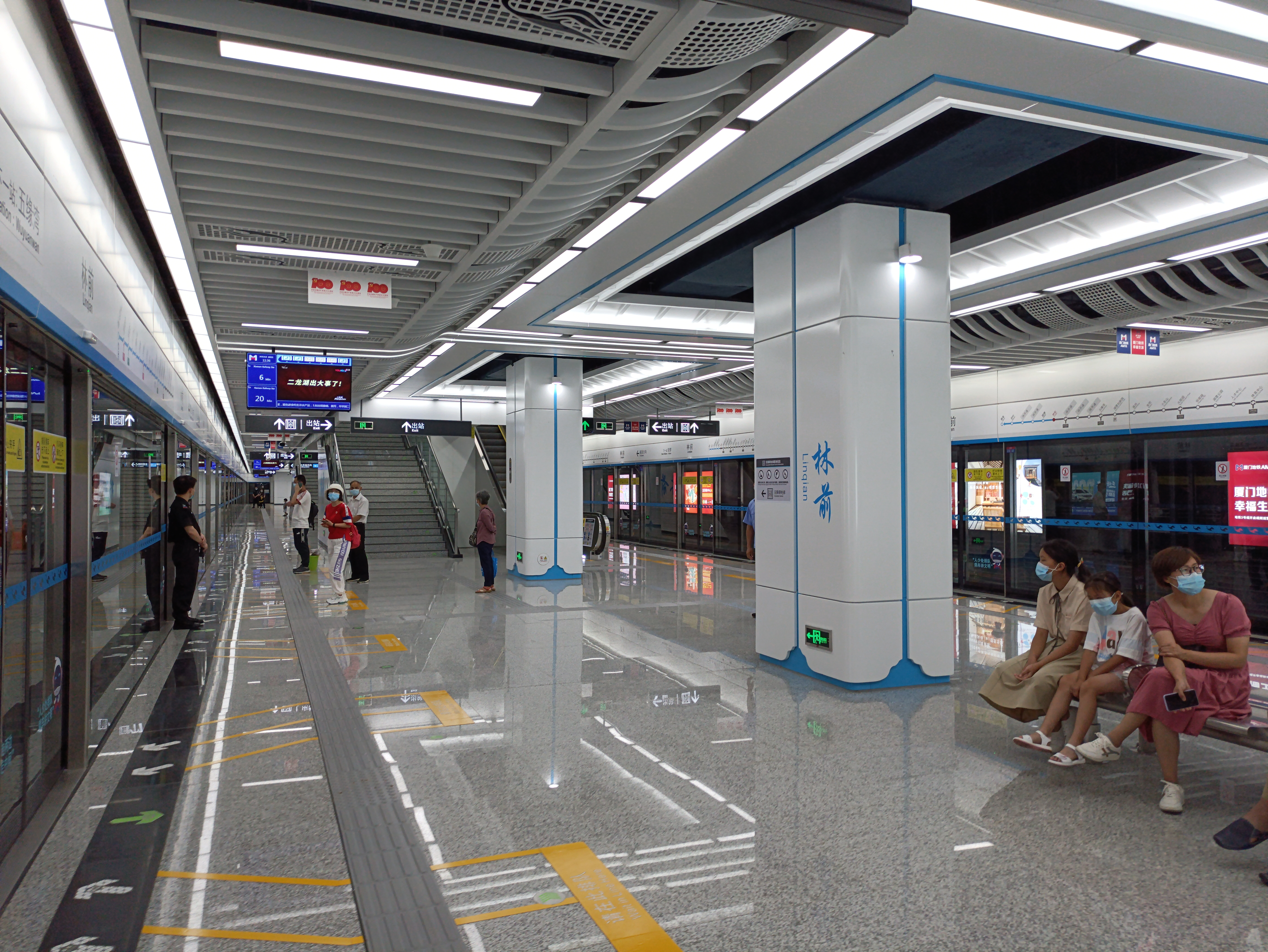
- Linqian station

Overview
- Status: In operation
- Locale: Xiamen, Fujian, China
- Termini: Xiamen Railway Station; Caicuo
- Stations: 32 (21 in operation)

Service
- Type: Rapid transit
- System: Xiamen Metro

History
- Opened: 25 June 2021; 5 years ago

Technical
- Line length: 26.5 km (16.47 mi) (in operation)
- Number of tracks: 2
- Character: Underground
- Track gauge: 1,435 mm (4 ft 8 1/2 in)
- Operating speed: 80 km/h (50 mph)

Chinese name
- Traditional Chinese: 廈門軌道交通3號線
- Simplified Chinese: 厦门轨道交通3号线
- Hokkien POJ: Ē-mn̂g Kúi-tō Kau-thong saⁿ hō soàⁿ
Transcriptions
Standard Mandarin
- Hanyu Pinyin: Xiàmén guǐdào jiāotōng sān hào xiàn
- Wade–Giles: Hsia^{4}-mên^{2} kui^{3}-tao^{4} chiao^{1}-t‘ung^{1} san^{1} hao^{4} hsien^{4}
- IPA: [ɕjâ.mə̌n kwèɪ.tâʊ tɕjáʊ.tʰʊ́ŋ sán xâʊ ɕjɛ̂n]
Yue: Cantonese
- Yale Romanization: Hahmùhn gwáidouh gāautūng sāam houh sin
- Jyutping: haa6 mun4 gwai2 dou6 gaau1 tung1 saam1 hou6 sin3
- IPA: [ha˨.mun˩ kʷɐj˧˥.tɔw˨ kaw˥.tʰʊŋ˥ sam˥ hɔw˨ sin˧]
Southern Min
- Hokkien POJ: Ē-mn̂g Kúi-tō Kau-thong saⁿ hō soàⁿ

Line 3 of the Xiamen Metro is a metro line in Xiamen. The line running from Xiamen Railway Station to Caicuo, is 26.5 kilometres (16.5 mi) long with 21 stations in operation. The line features a 4-kilometre (2.5 mi) undersea tunnel. Construction began in August 2016 and the section from Xiamen Railway Station to Caicuo (Phase 1 & Phase 2 West section) was opened on June 25, 2021. The remaining section of Phase 2, from Caicuo to Xiang'an Airport is currently under construction. A Southern extension to Shapowei is also under construction.

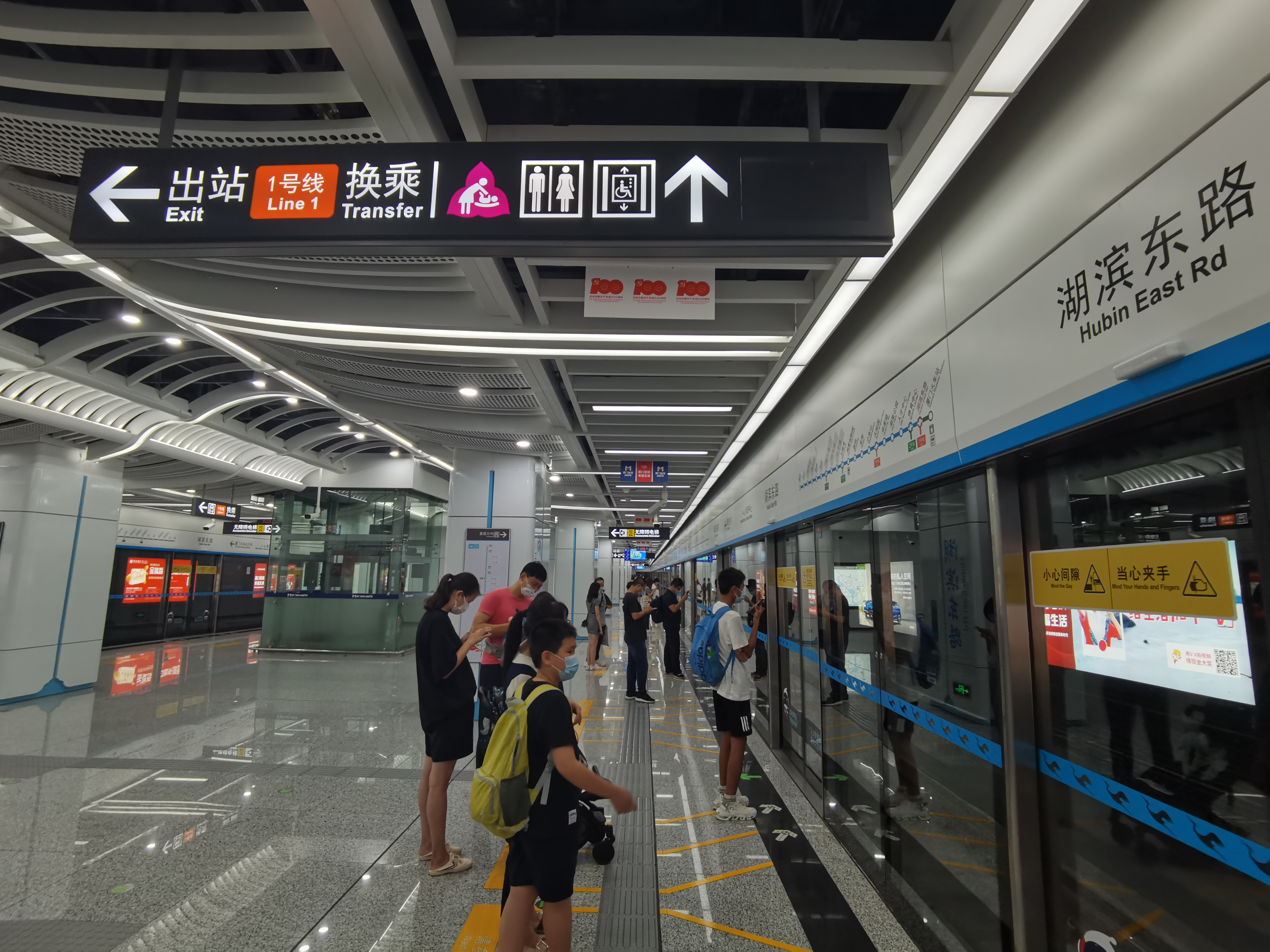
Hubin East Rd Station

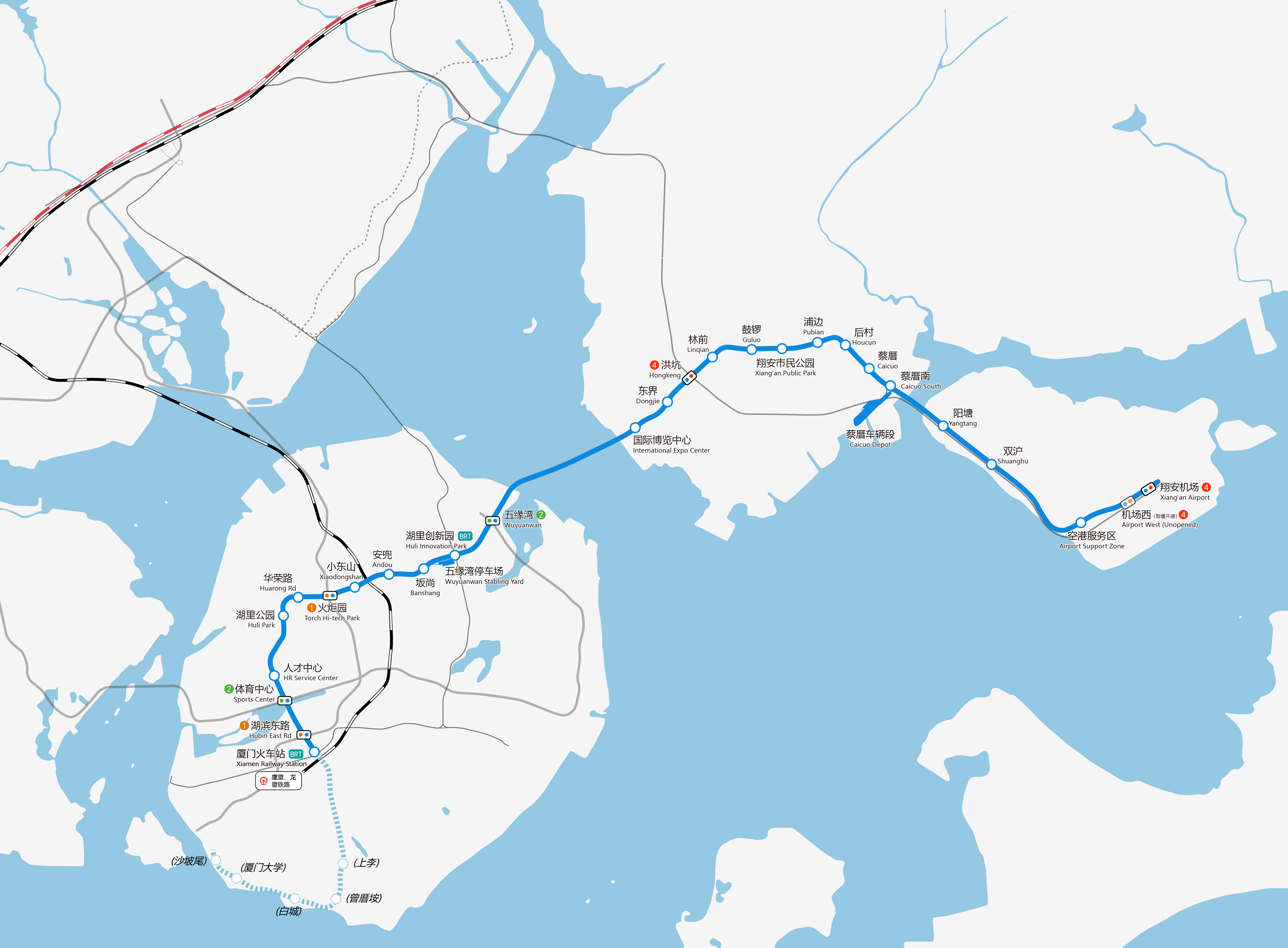
Line 3 map

== Opening timeline ==
| Segment | Commencement | Length | Station(s) | Name |
|---|---|---|---|---|
| Xiamen Railway Station — Caicuo | 25 June 2021 | 26.5 km (16.47 mi) | 16 | Phase 1 & Phase 2 west section |
| Pubian | 5 September 2022 | | 1 | Infill station |
| Sports & Convention Center, Hongkeng, Dongjie, Xiang'an Public Park | 25 June 2023 | | 4 | Infill stations |

== Stations ==
| Station name | | | Connections | Distance km | Location |
| English | Hàn-jī | Pe̍h-ōe-jī | Connections | Distance km | Location |
|---|---|---|---|---|---|
| Shapowei | 沙坡尾 | Soa-pho-bé | | | Siming |
| Xiamen University | 厦门大学 | Ē-mn̂g Toā-o̍h | | | Siming |
| Baicheng | 白城 | Pe̍h-siâⁿ | | | Siming |
| Zengcuo'an | 曾厝垵 | Chan-chhù-oaⁿ | | | Siming |
| Shangli | 上李 | Siōng-lí | | | Siming |
| Xiamen Railway Station | 厦门火车站 | Ē-mn̂g Hé-chhia-chām | XMS, Xiamen BRT | | Siming |
| Hubin East Rd | 湖滨东路 | Ô͘-pin Tang-lō͘ | 1 | | Siming |
| Sports Center | 体育中心 | Thé-io̍k Tiong-sim | 2 | | Siming |
| HR Service Center | 人才中心 | Lîn-châi Tiong-sim | | | Siming |
| Huli Park | 湖里公园 | Ô͘-lí Kong-hn̂g | | | Huli |
| Huarong Rd | 华荣路 | Hoâ-îng-lō͘ | | | Huli |
| Torch Hi-Tech Park | 火炬园 | Hé-kū-hn̂g | 1 | | Huli |
| Xiaodongshan | 小东山 | Sió-tang-soaⁿ | | | Huli |
| Andou | 安兜 | Am-thâu | | | Huli |
| Banshang | 坂尚 | Poáⁿ-siōng | | | Huli |
| Huli Innovation Park | 湖里创新园 | Ô͘-lí Chhòng-sin-hn̂g | Xiamen BRT | | Huli |
| Wuyuanwan | 五缘湾 | Ngó͘-iân-oan | 2 | | Huli |
| International Expo Center | 国际博览中心 | Kok-chè Pok-lám Tiong-sim | | | Xiang'an |
| Dongjie | 东界 | Tang-koè | | | Xiang'an |
| Hongkeng | 洪坑 | Âng-khiⁿ | 4 | | Xiang'an |
| Linqian | 林前 | Nâ-châiⁿ | | | Xiang'an |
| Guluo | 鼓锣 | Kó͘-lô | | | Xiang'an |
| Xiang'an Public Park | 翔安市民公园 | Siông-an Chhī-bîn Kong-hn̂g | | | Xiang'an |
| Pubian | 浦边 | Phó͘-piⁿ | | | Xiang'an |
| Houcun | 后村 | Āu-chhng | | | Xiang'an |
| Caicuo | 蔡厝 | Chhoà-chhù | | | Xiang'an |
| Caicuo South | 蔡厝南 | Chhoà-chhù-lâm | | | Xiang'an |
| Yangtang | 阳塘 | Iûⁿ-tn̂g | | | Xiang'an |
| Shuanghu | 双沪 | Siang-hō͘ | | | Xiang'an |
| Airport Service Area | 空港服务区 | Kong-káng Hok-bū-khu | | | Xiang'an |
| Airport West | 机场西 | Ki-tiûⁿ-se | 4 | | Xiang'an |
| Xiang'an Airport | 翔安机场 | Siông-an Ki-tiûⁿ | 4 Xiamen Xiang'an | | Xiang'an |
