= Xiamen Metro =

Rapid transit system in Xiamen, China

Coordinates: 24.479722°N 118.081944°E

Xiamen Metro AMTR

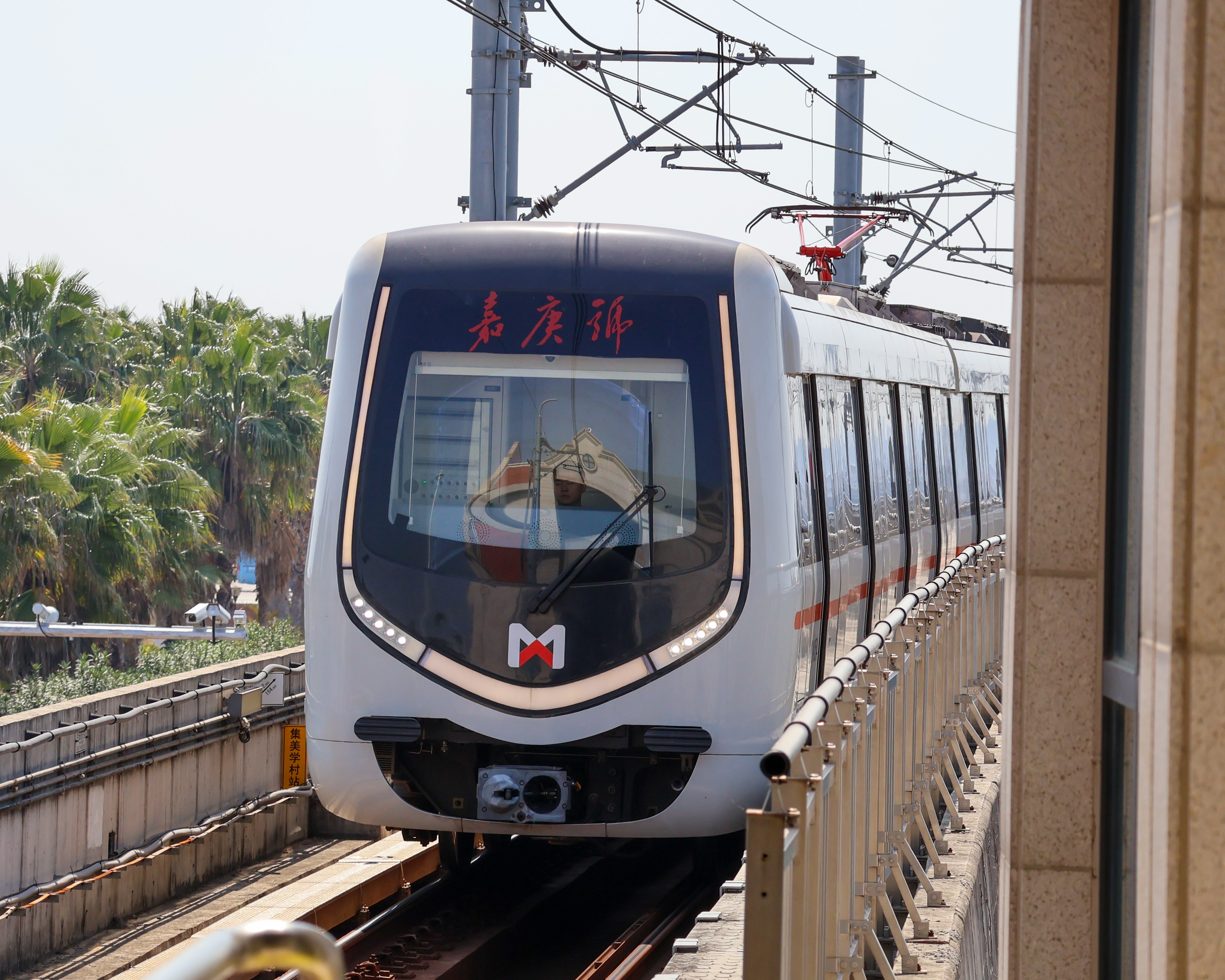

Overview
- Owner: Xiamen Rail Transit Construction & Development Group Corporation Limited
- Locale: Xiamen, Fujian Province, China
- Transit type: Rapid transit
- Number of lines: 5
- Number of stations: 92
- Daily ridership: 1,121,400 (31/12/2025 peak, highest daily ridership record)
- Website: www.xmgdjt.com.cn

Operation
- Began operation: 31 December 2017; 8 years ago
- Operators: Xiamen Rail Transit Construction & Development Group Corporation Limited

Technical
- System length: 98.4 kilometres (61.1 mi)
- Track gauge: 1,435 mm (4 ft 8 1/2 in) standard gauge
System map

Xiamen Metro
- Simplified Chinese: 厦门轨道交通
- Traditional Chinese: 廈門軌道交通
- Literal meaning: Xiamen Rail Transportation
Transcriptions
Standard Mandarin
- Hanyu Pinyin: Xiàmén guǐdào jiāotōng
Southern Min
- Hokkien POJ: Ē-mn̂g khuí-tō kau-thong

Commonly abbreviated as
- Simplified Chinese: 厦门地铁
- Traditional Chinese: 廈門地鐵
- Literal meaning: Xiamen Metro
Transcriptions
Standard Mandarin
- Hanyu Pinyin: Xiàmén dìtiě
Southern Min
- Hokkien POJ: Ē-mn̂g tē-thih

Xiamen Metro, officially branded as AMTR (Amoy Transit Rail, or Across Mass Transit Railway), is a rapid transit system serving Xiamen, Fujian, China, with its first line, Line 1, commencing operations on 31 December 2017, with two more lines opening since.

== Background ==
Planning for a metro system began in the early 2000s, in the meantime the mostly elevated Xiamen BRT opened in 2008.

The initial phase of construction of the metro system was compiled as the Xiamen Urban Rail Transit Construction Plan (2011–2020) on 24 December 2010 and was approved by the National Development and Reform Commission on 11 May 2012. The construction started on 13 November 2013. Xiamen Urban Rail Transit Group was founded for the purpose of construction and operation. On 8 October 2016, the National Development and Reform Commission approved phase II of the Xiamen Urban Rail Transit Construction Plan (2016–2022).

The approved phase I metro expansion plan includes three lines (1, 2, 3) with 62 stations, 75.3 kilometres (46.8 mi) in length. The construction cost is projected to be 50.37 billion yuan.

The approved phase II metro expansion plan includes four lines (2 Phase II, 3 Phase II, 4, 6) with 67 stations, 152.2 kilometres (94.6 mi) in length. The construction cost is projected to be 100.092 billion yuan. The plan was later adjusted to include a Line 3 Southern Extension, which will extend Line 3 further south by 4 stations, 7.35 kilometres (4.57 mi) in length. The construction cost is projected to be 5.769 billion yuan.

In addition, a regional rail system consisting of two lines (Quanzhou–Xiamen–Zhangzhou and Zhangzhou–Gangwei–Xiamen) and 263 kilometres (163 mi) in length was also approved.

== Network ==
Notes: Both Line 4 and Line 6 are under trial operation for the public so it not counted as an official in operation line.

Line	Terminals (District)		Commencement	Newest extension	Length km	Stations
1	Zhenhai Road (Siming)	Yannei (Jimei)	31 December 2017	—	30.30	24
2	Tianzhushan (Haicang)	Wuyuanwan (Huli)	25 December 2019	—	41.64	32
3	Xiamen Railway Station (Siming)	Caicuo (Xiang'an)	25 June 2021	—	26.5	21

Map of the Xiamen Metro to scale.

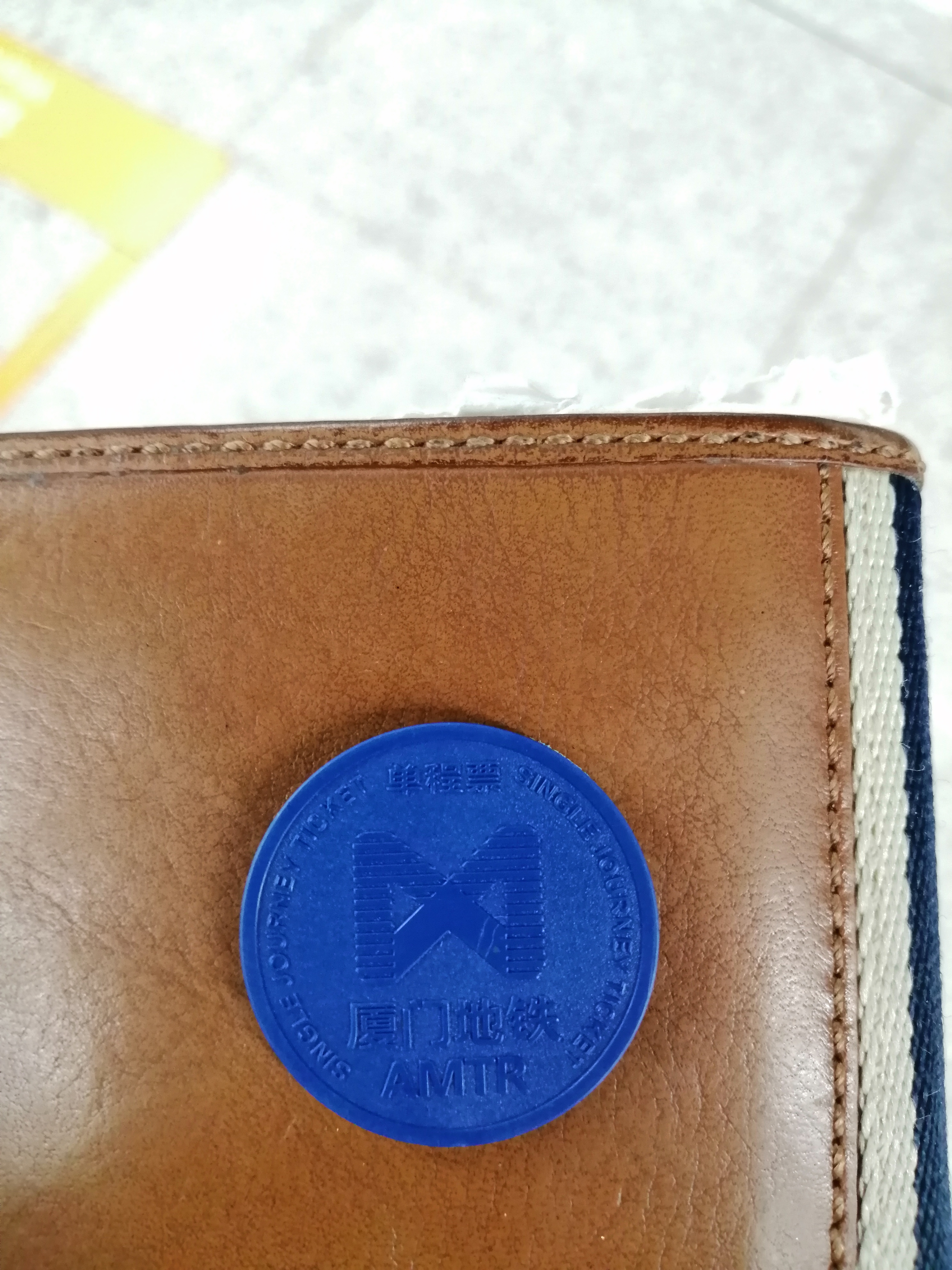
Xiamen Metro single journey ticket

=== Line 1 ===
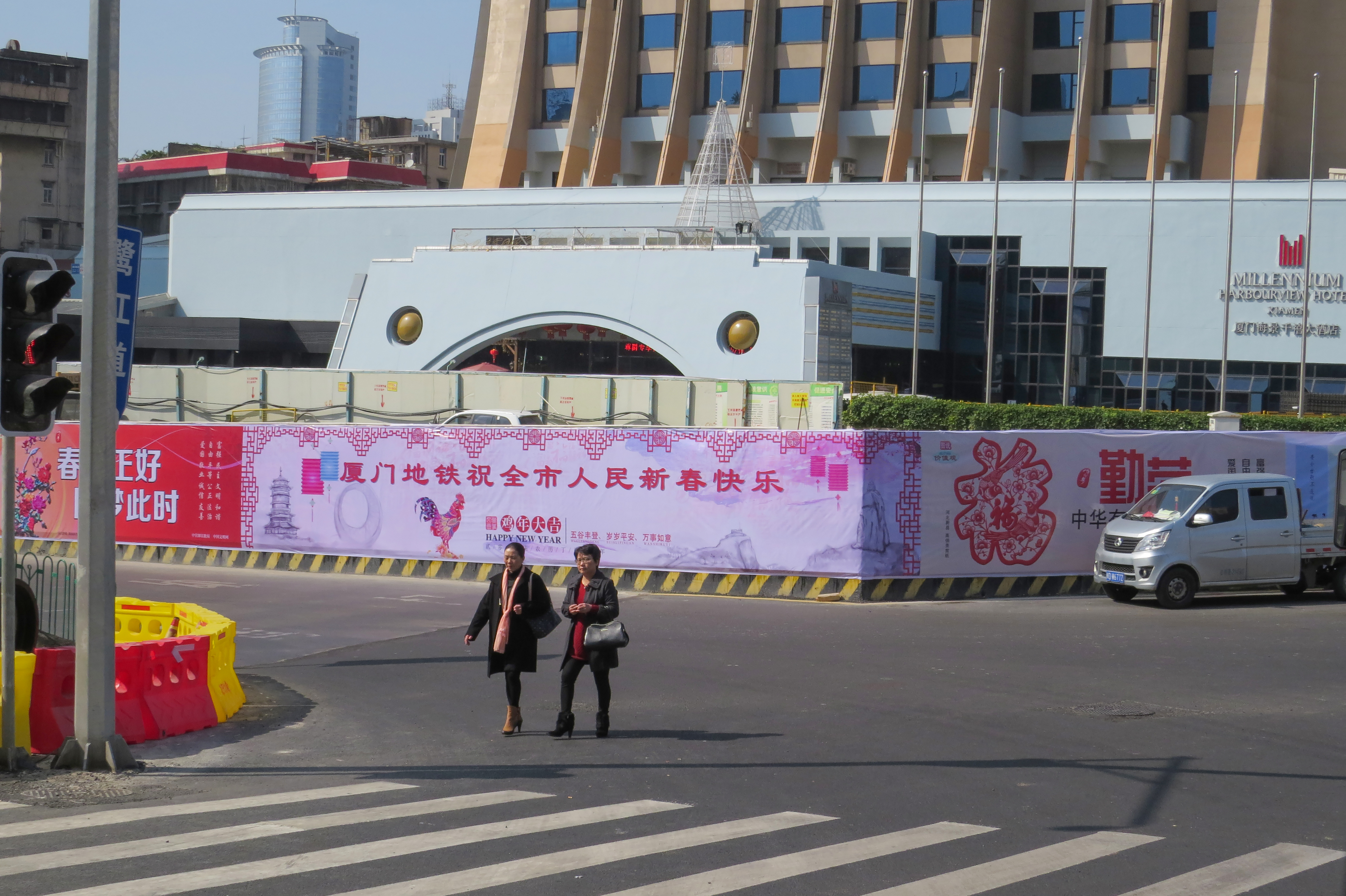
Construction site of Zhenhai Road station, the western terminus of Line 1

Line 1, with 24 stations, 30.3 kilometres (18.83 mi) length, 50 min duration of trip and 20.39 billion yuan cost of construction, was opened on 31 December 2017. The line goes from south to north. The depot is situated at the northern end and is Xiamen Metro's principal depot. The line goes through Xiamen North railway station and connects the island (with 9 stations) and mainland (with 14 stations) parts of the city through a dam (with 1 station). Route: Lundu Ferry Terminal, Old Town, Jimei New Town, Xiamen North Railway Station. Line 1 uses six car CRRC Tangshan rolling stock. Line 1's color is orange.

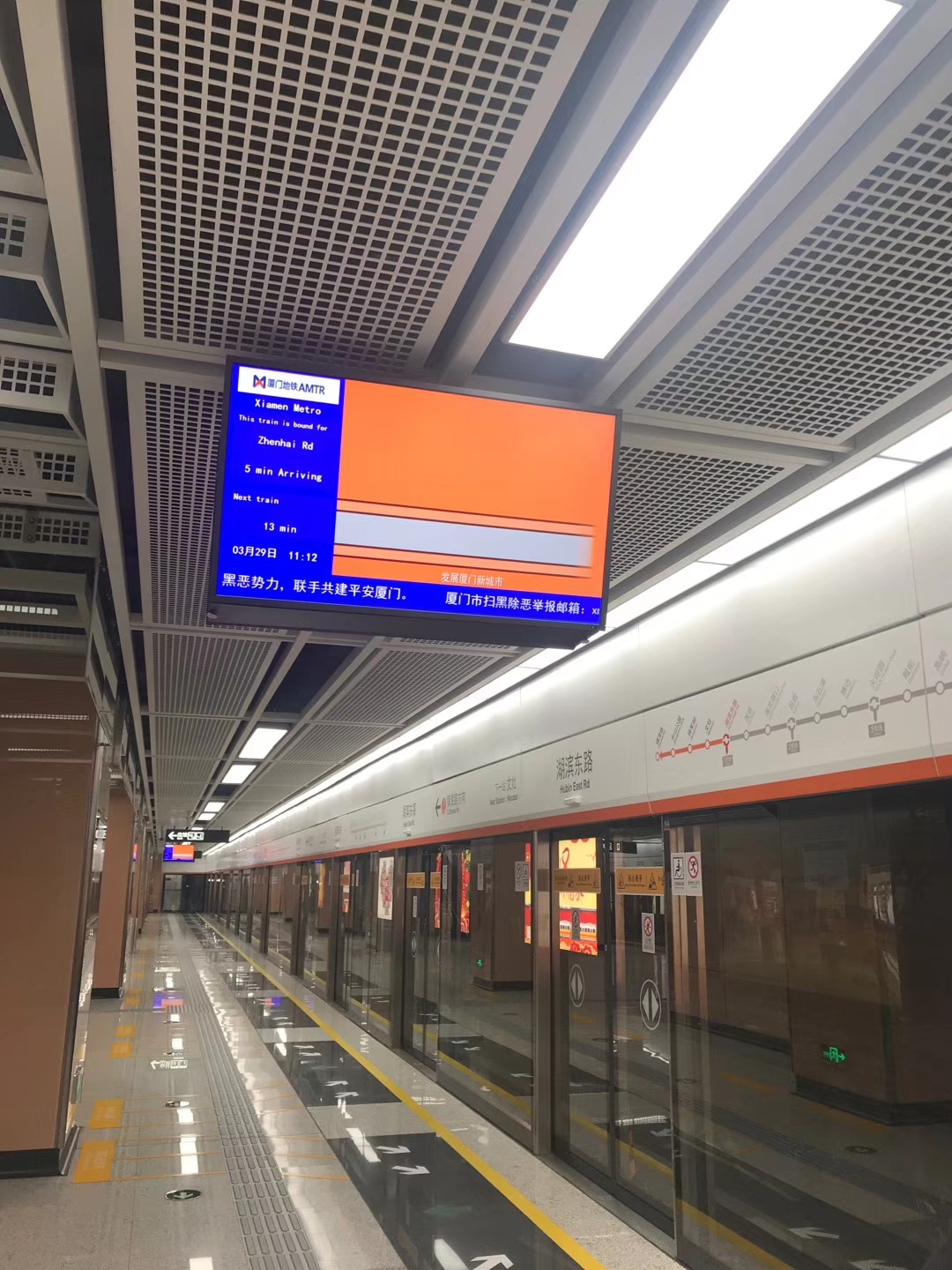
The view of the platform at Hubin East Road station

=== Line 2 ===
Line 2 is 41.64 kilometres (25.87 mi) in length with 32 stations. It was opened on 25 December 2019. It runs from east to west through Xiamen Island and then through Haicang channel to the mainland. Line 2's color is green.

=== Line 3 ===
Line 3 is 26.5 kilometres (16.47 mi) in length with 21 stations that opened on 25 June 2021. It serves the Xiamen Island from southwest to northeast and then crosses over to the mainland. Line 3's color is cyan.

=== Line 4 ===
Line 4 Phase 1 started construction in 2015. It will be 44.8 kilometres (27.84 mi) in length with 12 stations and is scheduled to be complete by 2026. Unlike other lines, which are radial lines that connect Xiamen island to the mainland, Line 4 line is a tangential express line with wide stop spacings and trains running up to 120 km/h (75 mph). The line runs strictly on the mainland around Xiamen Island acting as a suburban arc line. It will connect Xiamen's new Xiang'an Airport to Xiamen North railway station. Line 4's color is red.

=== Line 6 ===
Line 6, after the Jiatong Section became Line 9, is made of three sections: a Xiamen Section, a Zhangzhou Section and a latter additional extension after the removal of the Line 6 Jiatong Section. The three sections total 32.9 kilometres (20.44 mi) in length with 22 stations. Like Line 4, it is a tangential line running strictly on the mainland north of Xiamen Island. Line 6's color is violet.

== Under construction ==
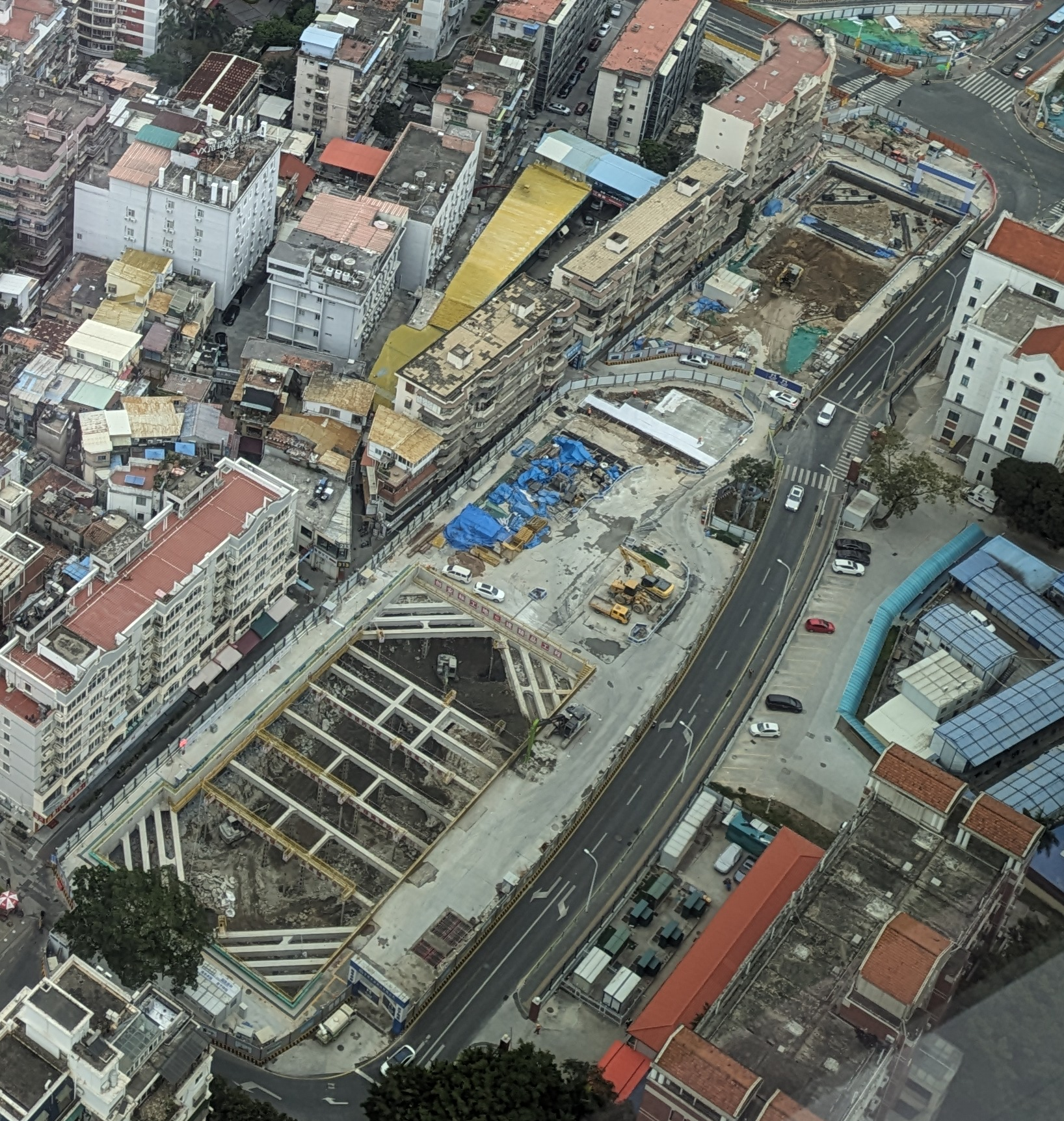
A station under construction in 2024

=== Line 3 South Extension and Remaining Airport Section ===
Line 3 will ultimately be 45.01 kilometres (27.97 mi) in length with 31 stations, with extensions on both ends of Line 3 currently under construction. A southern extension is 8.29 kilometres (5.15 mi) long with 5 stations, and a remaining 10-kilometre (6.21 mi) section towards Xiamen's new Xiang'an Airport.

=== Line 9 ===
Line 9 Phase 1 started construction in 2022. It was formerly a section of Line 6 called the Line 6 Jiatong Section but was later split into Line 9 Phase 1. The total length of Line 9 Phase 1 is 30.7 kilometres (19.08 mi) kilometers with 17 stations, and runs completely underground. The full Line 9 Phase 1 and 2 is 44 kilometres (27.34 mi) with 24 stations, including 10 transfer stations, with an average station spacing of 1.91 kilometres (1.19 mi). Line 9's color is blue.

== Future plans ==
Line 4 Phase 2 will extend Line 4 west 14.8 kilometres (9.2 mi) with 5 stations. The project approved as part of the phase II metro expansion plan is planned to start construction in 2025 with a 2028 opening date.

A Phase III metro expansion of plan is currently being proposed which will include Phase 1 of Line 5, 7 and 8 Line 8 as well as a Phase 2 extension of Line 9, totalling 88 km (54.7 mi) of new metro line. All proposed lines will run fully underground. Line 5 Phase 1 is 35 km (21.7 mi) long with 18 stations. Line 7 Phase 1 is 17 km (10.6 mi) long with 13 stations. Line 8 is 18 km (11.2 mi) long with 10 stations. Line 9 Phase 2 will extend Line 9 into Xiamen Island 18 kilometres (11.2 mi) with 11 stations.

A long term plan, Line 10, spanning 40.4 kilometers (25.1 mi) with 31 stations, is proposed to primarily be reconstructed from the Xiamen BRT. Additionally, Line 4 and Line 10, like Line 1, will intersect at the new central Xiamen North railway station located in Jimei District.

In addition, there are plans to connect the Xiamen Metro with neighboring cities of Zhangzhou and Quanzhou using a new express subway Line R1. The plans were approved in 2015 by the NDRC.

The "Xiamen Urban Rail Transit Network Plan (2020-2035)" consists of 12 lines with a total length of approximately 493 km (306 mi). This includes 7 regular speed metro lines : Line 1, Line 2, Line 3, Line 6, Line 7, Line 10, and Line 11, totaling approximately 297 km (185 mi); 4 express metro lines : Line 4, Line 5, Line 8, and Line 9, totaling approximately 186 km (116 mi); and 1 track control line, totaling approximately 10 km (6.2 mi). In addition, the long-term network plan will add 5 more track control lines to the existing network, increasing the length by approximately 79 km (49 mi), bringing the total network length to approximately 572 km (355 mi).

== See also ==
- List of metro systems
- Urban rail transit in China
