= International Expo Center station =

International Expo Center station may refer to:

- International Expo Center station (Chongqing Rail Transit), a station on Line 6 (Chongqing Rail Transit)
- International Expo Center station (Nanchang Metro), a station on Line 2 (Nanchang Metro).
- International Expo Center station (Xiamen Metro), a station on Line 3 (Xiamen Metro).
