= Line 2 (Xiamen Metro) =

Metro line in Xiamen, China

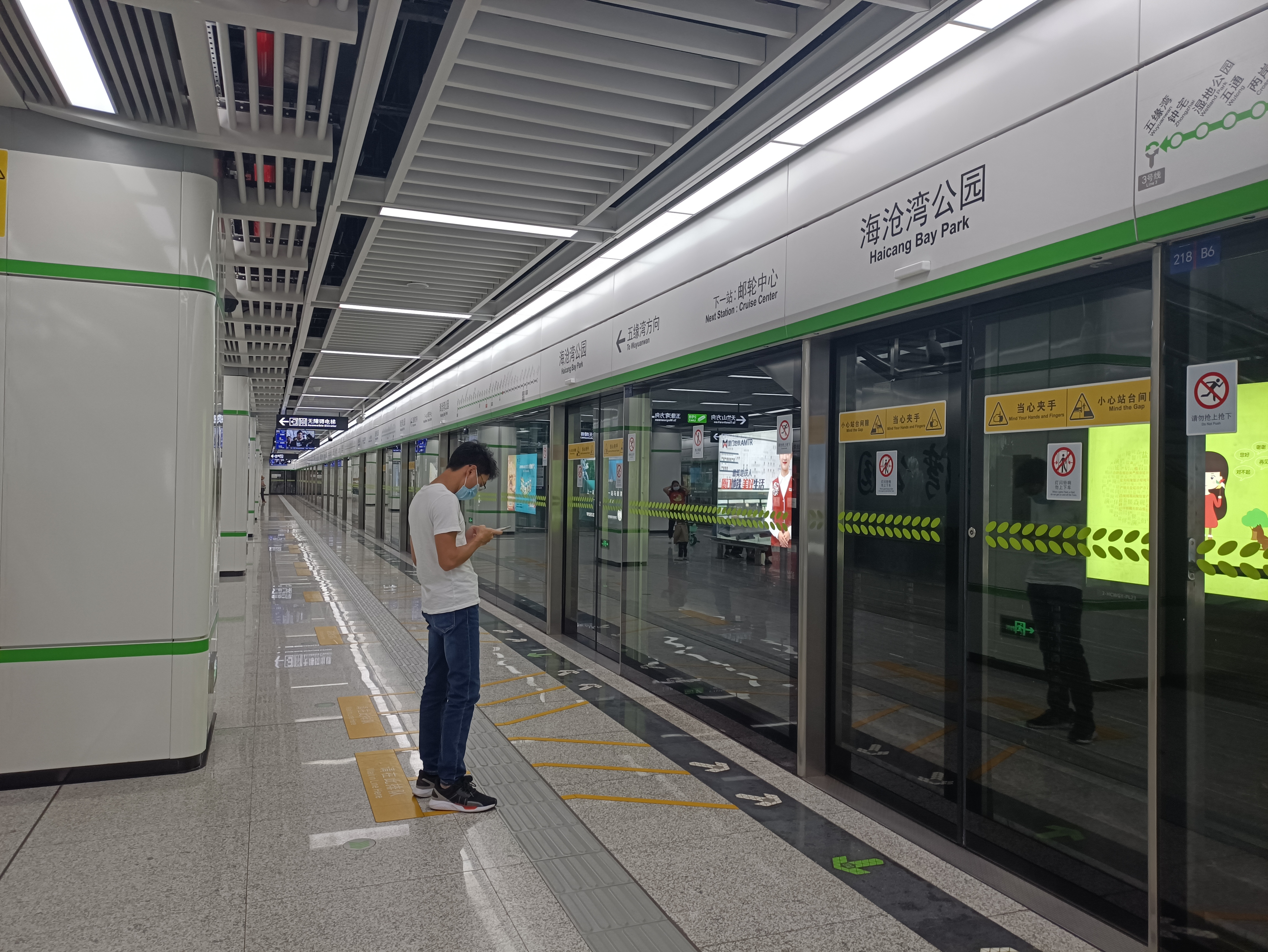
- Haicang Bay Park station

Overview
- Status: In operation
- Locale: Xiamen, Fujian, China
- Termini: Wuyuanwan; Tianzhushan
- Stations: 32 (30 in operation)

Service
- Type: Rapid transit
- System: Xiamen Metro

History
- Opened: 25 December 2019; 6 years ago

Technical
- Line length: 41.64 km (25.87 mi)
- Number of tracks: 2
- Character: Underground
- Track gauge: 1,435 mm (4 ft 8 1/2 in)
- Operating speed: 80 km/h (50 mph)

Chinese name
- Traditional Chinese: 廈門軌道交通2號線
- Simplified Chinese: 厦门轨道交通2号线
- Hokkien POJ: Ē-mn̂g Kúi-tō Kau-thong lī hō soàⁿ
Transcriptions
Standard Mandarin
- Hanyu Pinyin: Xiàmén guǐdào jiāotōng èr hào xiàn
- Wade–Giles: Hsia^{4}-mên^{2} kui^{3}-tao^{4} chiao^{1}-t‘ung^{1} êrh^{4} hao^{4} hsien^{4}
- IPA: [ɕjâ.mə̌n kwèɪ.tâʊ tɕjáʊ.tʰʊ́ŋ âɚ xâʊ ɕjɛ̂n]
Yue: Cantonese
- Yale Romanization: Hahmùhn gwáidouh gāautūng yih houh sin
- Jyutping: haa6 mun4 gwai2 dou6 gaau1 tung1 ji6 hou6 sin3
- IPA: [ha˨.mun˩ kʷɐj˧˥.tɔw˨ kaw˥.tʰʊŋ˥ ji˨ hɔw˨ sin˧]
Southern Min
- Hokkien POJ: Ē-mn̂g Kúi-tō Kau-thong lī hō soàⁿ
Route map

Line 2 of the Xiamen Metro is a subway line in Xiamen. The line running from Wuyuanwan to Tianzhushan, has 32 stations and is 41.64 kilometres (25.87 mi) long. It was opened on December 25, 2019.

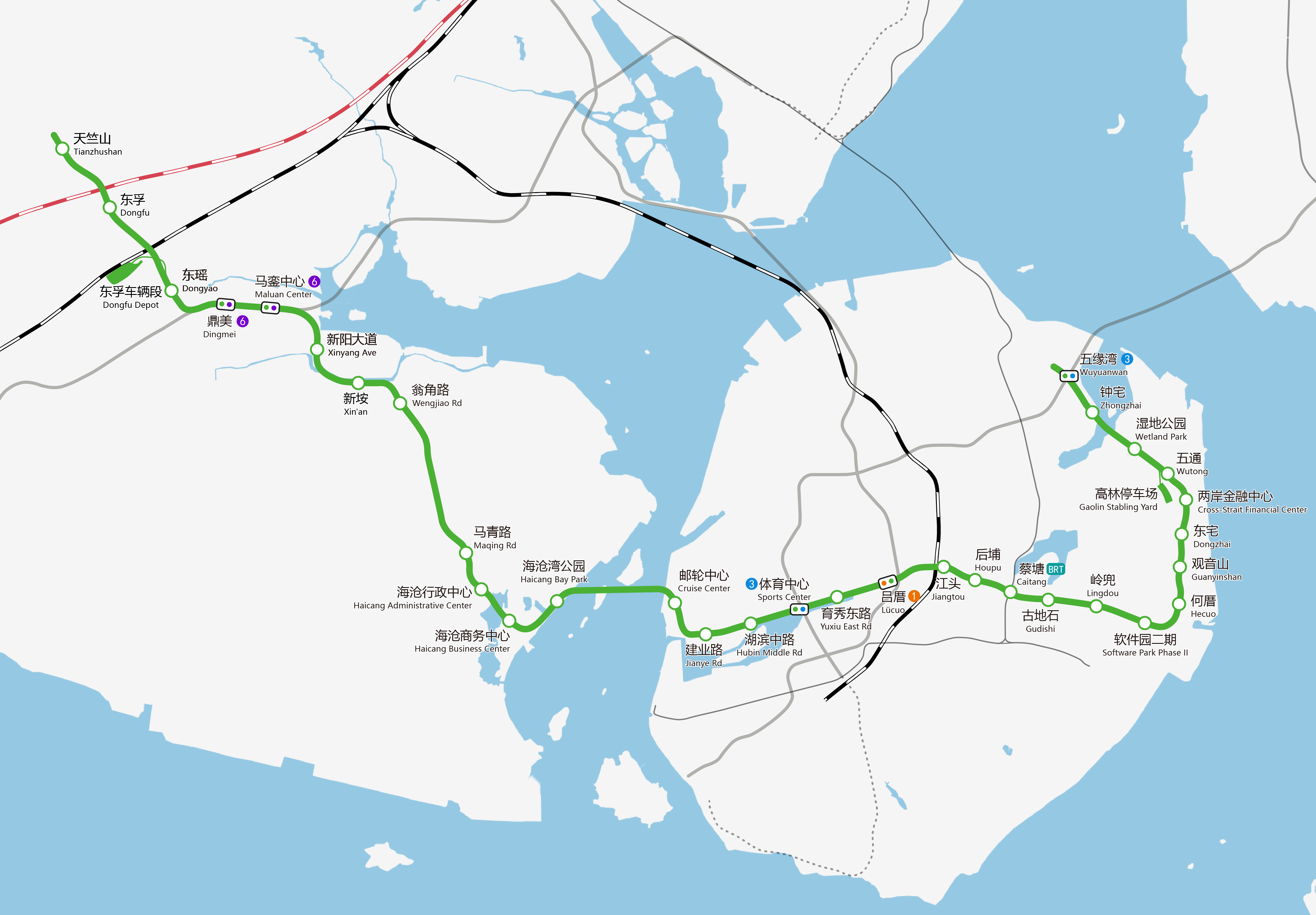
Line 2 map

Line 2 is the first undersea metro line in Mainland China.

== Opening timeline ==
| Segment | Commencement | Length | Station(s) | Name |
|---|---|---|---|---|
| Wuyuanwan — Tianzhushan | 25 December 2019 | 41.64 km (25.87 mi) | 29 | Phase 1 & 2 |
| Dongyao | 26 April 2021 | Infill station | 1 | |

== Stations ==
| Station name | | | Connections | Distance km | Location |
| English | Hàn-jī | Pe̍h-ōe-jī | Connections | Distance km | Location |
|---|---|---|---|---|---|
| Tianzhushan | 天竺山 | Thian-tiok-soaⁿ | | | Haicang |
| Dongfu | 东孚 | Tong-hû | | | Haicang |
| Dongyao | 东瑶 | Tong-iâu | | | Haicang |
| Dingmei | 鼎美 | Tiáⁿ-bé | 6 | | Haicang |
| Maluan Center | 马銮中心 (Note: Was temporary opened during 1-2 May 2024 during a music festival event.) | Bé-noâ Tiong-sim | 6 | | Haicang |
| Xinyang Avenue | 新阳大道 | Sin-iûⁿ Toā-tō͘ | | | Haicang |
| Xin'an | 新垵 | Sin-oaⁿ | | | Haicang |
| Wengjiao Road | 翁角路 | Ong-kak-lō͘ | | | Haicang |
| Maqing Road | 马青路 | Má-chhing-lō͘ | | | Haicang |
| Haicang Administrative Center | 海沧行政中心 | Hái-chhng Hîng-chìng Tiong-sim | | | Haicang |
| Haicang Business Center | 海沧商务中心 | Hái-chhng Siong-bū Tiong-sim | | | Haicang |
| Haicang Bay Park | 海沧湾公园 | Hái-chhng-oan Kong-hn̂g | | | Haicang |
| Cruise Center | 邮轮中心 | Iû-lûn Tiong-sim | | | Huli |
| Jianye Road | 建业路 | Kiàn-gia̍p-lō͘ | | | Siming |
| Hubin Middle Road | 湖滨中路 | Ô͘-pin Tiong-lō͘ | | | Siming |
| Sports Center | 体育中心 | Thé-io̍k Tiong-sim | 3 | | Siming |
| Yuxiu East Road | 育秀东路 | Io̍k-siù Tang-lō͘ | | | Siming |
| Lücuo | 吕厝 | Lū-chhù | 1 | | Siming |
| Jiangtou | 江头 | Káng-thâu | | | Siming |
| Houpu | 后埔 | Āu-po͘ | | | Siming |
| Caitang | 蔡塘 | Chhoà-tn̂g | Xiamen BRT | | Siming |
| Gudishi | 古地石 | Kó͘-tē-chio̍h | | | Siming |
| Lingdou | 岭兜 | Niá-tau | | | Siming |
| Software Park Phase II | 软件园二期 | Nńg-kiāⁿ-hn̂g Lī-kî | | | Siming |
| Hecuo | 何厝 | Oâ-chhù | | | Siming |
| Guanyinshan | 观音山 | Koan-im-soaⁿ | | | Siming |
| Dongzhai | 东宅 | Tang-the̍h | | | Huli |
| Cross-Strait Financial Center | 两岸金融中心 | Nn̄g-hoāⁿ Kim-iông Tiong-sim | | | Huli |
| Wutong | 五通 | Ngó͘-thong | | | Huli |
| Wetland Park | 湿地公园 | Sip-toē Kong-hn̂g | | | Huli |
| Zhongzhai | 钟宅 | Ching-the̍h | | | Huli |
| Wuyuanwan | 五缘湾 | Ú-iân-oan | 3 | | Huli |

== Construction mishap ==
In mid-December 2019, construction works near the Siming District were affected by subsidence. A major water pipe burst, and dirty water flooded the construction site, affecting the concourse, platform and metro lines under construction. The subsidence also caused a collapse of the surface road and a resulting crater of approximately 500 square metres (5,400 sq ft). The cause is believed to be a burst water pipe. Water also penetrated the now-opened Lücuo station of Line 1, and flooded the concourse and platform.
