= Xiamen Xiang'an International Airport =

Future airport to serve Xiamen, Fujian, China

Xiamen Xiang'an International Airport 厦门翔安国际机场
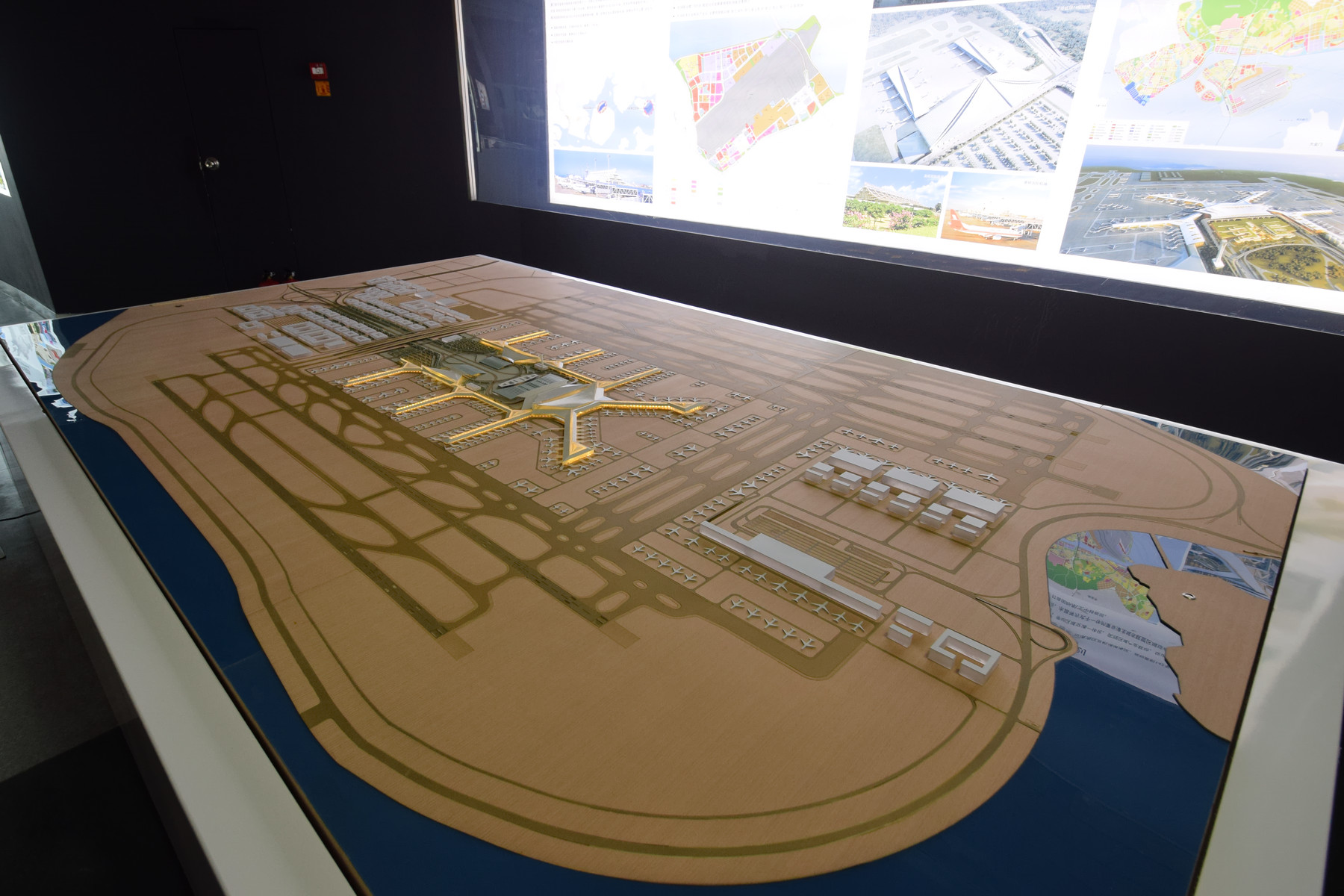
- Model of the Xiamen Xiang'an International Airport
- IATA: XMN (once opened); ICAO: ZSAM (once opened)

Summary
- Airport type: Public
- Serves: Xiamen
- Location: Dadeng Island, Xiang'an, Xiamen, Fujian, China
- Opened: 24 December 2026; 43 days' time
- Hub for: XiamenAir
- Coordinates: 24°33′13″N 118°21′12″E

Map
- Location in Fujian Xiang'an Airport (China)

Runways
Direction	Length		Surface
Direction	m	ft	Surface
	3,800	12,467	Asphalt concrete
	3,800	12,467	Concrete
	3,800	12,467	Concrete

Xiamen Xiang'an International Airport
- Simplified Chinese: 厦门翔安国际机场
- Traditional Chinese: 廈門翔安國際機場
Transcriptions
Standard Mandarin
- Hanyu Pinyin: Xiàmén Xiáng'ãn Guójì Jīchǎng
Southern Min
- Hokkien POJ: Ē-mn̂g Siông-an Kok-chè Ki-tiû

Xiamen Xiang'an International Airport (IATA: XMN, ICAO: ZSAM) is an under-construction international airport being built to serve the city of Xiamen in East China's Fujian province. Once opened, it will replace the existing Xiamen Gaoqi International Airport as the city's main airport. The airport is located on the Dadeng Island in Xiang'an, facing Nan'an, Quanzhou to the north. It is 25 km (16 mi) from central Xiamen, 44 km (27 mi) from downtown Quanzhou, and 72 km (45 mi) from Zhangzhou. It is only 3 km (1.9 mi) at the closest point from Kinmen of the Republic of China (ROC). Basic construction of the airport finished by the end of 2025; opening is expected on 24 December 2026.

== Name ==
Most airports in mainland China are named after the districts and counties where they are located. Since the new Xiamen airport was built in Xiang'an District of Xiamen City, the airport was named "Xiamen Xiang'an International Airport". On January 24, 2025, the Civil Aviation Administration of China approved the naming of the airport as "Xiamen Xiang'an International Airport".

== Overview ==
The planned area for the new Xiamen airport is approximately 50 square kilometers, with a 4F flight zone rating. It is planned to have four runways, capable of accommodating the world's largest aircraft (such as the Boeing 747-8, Boeing 777-9X, and Airbus A380). The terminal building and supporting facilities will cover an area of approximately 1 million square meters.

The first phase of the project is scheduled for completion in 2025, designed to handle 45 million passengers, 750,000 tons of cargo, and 380,000 aircraft movements annually. The total investment for the project is 53.685 billion yuan (US$7.77 billion), of which 38.6 billion yuan is for airport construction. This includes the construction of two new long runways: the north runway will be built to 4F standard, 3,800 meters long and 45 meters wide, while the south runway will be built to 4E standard, also 3,600 meters long and 45 meters wide (this can be extended to 3,800 meters in the future depending on airport development); a new 550,000-square-meter terminal building; an apron with 196 aircraft stands; and related supporting facilities.

The near-term planning target year is 2030, projecting a passenger throughput of 62 million passengers, a cargo throughput of 1 million tons, and 510,000 aircraft takeoffs and landings. The plan includes adding a 3,600-meter-long second runway north of the first runway, and a second terminal building west of Terminal 1 and north of the access road. Upon completion, the terminal will have a parking apron capable of accommodating 177 passenger aircraft and 28 cargo aircraft.

In the long term planning by 2040, to meet the needs of 85 million passengers, 2 million tons of cargo throughput, and 630,000 aircraft takeoffs and landings, a 3,000-meter-long second runway will be added south of the first runway, and a third terminal will be added west of the first terminal and south of the access road. Upon completion, the terminal will have four runways.

== History ==
In 2007, given that both Xiamen Gaoqi International Airport and Quanzhou Jinjiang International Airport, two major aviation hubs in southern Fujian, were nearing their designated capacity and are both very difficult to expand (both were surrounded by urban buildings), the Fujian Provincial People's Government decided to build a new large airport in southern Fujian to meet the growing demand for air travel. The initial plan was for a first-phase design capacity of 30 million passengers per year, with a second phase reaching a design capacity of 60 million. Due to inaccurate estimates of air passenger traffic in Xiamen and southern Fujian, the airport capacity was subsequently revised several times. In July 2007, site selection for the new airport began, with 11 locations in Xiamen, Zhangzhou, and Quanzhou under consideration: five sites near the mountains, and six sites in the sea for land reclamation. After repeated demonstrations, it was determined that the airspace conditions near Dadeng Island in Xiang'an District of Xiamen were good and the noise impact was small, making it the best location.

On September 13, 2019, the overall plan for Xiamen New Airport was officially approved by the Civil Aviation Administration of China. In the short-term, three runways will be planned: North 1, North 2, and South 1. The Xiamen New Airport plan is based on a terminal layout of "one main terminal area, two approach points, three terminals, and four runways". On January 6, 2021, the preliminary review of the use of sea area for the new Xiamen airport was approved by the Ministry of Natural Resources. On April 29 of the same year, the National Development and Reform Commission officially approved the feasibility study report of the new Xiamen airport. In November, the preliminary design of the terminal area and supporting projects of the new Xiamen airport was jointly approved by the Civil Aviation Administration of China and the Fujian Provincial People's Government.

On January 4, 2022, the construction of the new Xiamen airport was started. On August 31, 2023, the main concrete structure of the Xiamen Xiang'an Airport Terminal (main building + concourse) was completed, the main structure of the North Parking Garage was successfully capped, and the hoisting of the first batch of steel structure roofs also began at the same time.

== Facilities ==
The airport will have three runways, which are 3,800 meters long, respectively (class 4F), the highest international standards. It will have a 660,000-square-metre (7,100,000 sq ft) terminal building designed in the Dacuo (大厝) architectural style native to the Minnan region.

== Disputes with ROC/Taiwan ==
The Civil Aviation Administration (CAA) of the Republic of China (ROC, Taiwan) has raised significant flight safety concerns regarding the construction of the airport, which is situated extremely close to the ROC-controlled Kinmen islands. In official statements, the CAA noted that the proximity of the two airports, with the new site located as close as 3 kilometers from Kinmen's airspace, creates a high risk of overlapping flight paths and operational conflicts. Despite repeated requests for technical coordination and planning data through established liaison channels, Taiwanese officials report that Chinese authorities have consistently ignored these inquiries.

=== Land reclamation and sand mining ===
Since the commencement of the land reclamation and sand mining project at Xiang'an Airport, severe coastal erosion has been discovered in neighboring Kinmen, which is closely related to the land reclamation and sand mining project at the airport.

=== Airspace concerns ===
As the airport is only less than 10 kilometres (6.2 mi) from Kinmen Airport, there is about 70% of airspace overlapping each other with Kinmen Airport, and the directions of runways are also similar. Together with cross-strait tensions, the problem of aviation safety has become an issue.

== Transport ==
It will be served by Line 3 and Line 4 of Xiamen Metro, and the future Quanzhou–Xiamen–Zhangzhou Intercity Railway Line.

== See also ==
- List of airports in China
- List of the busiest airports in China
- Kinmen–Xiamen Bridge
