= Line 1 (Xiamen Metro) =

Metro line in Xiamen, China

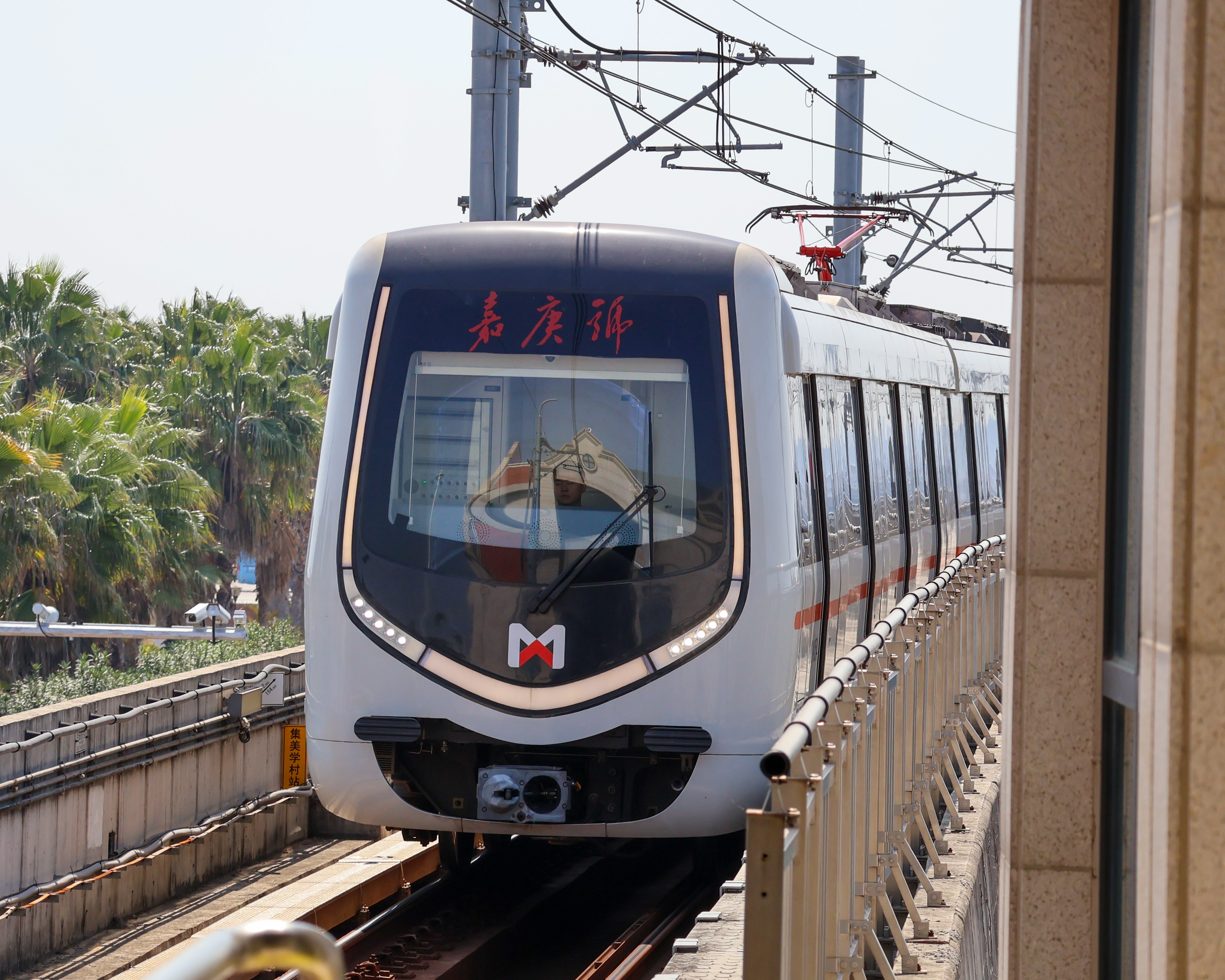
- A train entering Jimei School Village station

Overview
- Locale: Xiamen, Fujian, China
- Termini: Yannei; Zhenhai Road
- Stations: 24

Service
- Type: Rapid transit
- System: Xiamen Metro
- Operator: Xiamen Rail Transit Group Corporation Ltd

History
- Opened: 31 December 2017; 8 years ago

Technical
- Line length: 30.30 km (18.83 mi)
- Number of tracks: 2
- Character: Elevated & underground
- Track gauge: 1,435 mm (4 ft 8 1/2 in)
- Operating speed: 80 km/h (50 mph)

Chinese name
- Traditional Chinese: 廈門軌道交通1號線
- Simplified Chinese: 厦门轨道交通1号线
- Hokkien POJ: Ē-mn̂g Kúi-tō Kau-thong it hō soàⁿ
Transcriptions
Standard Mandarin
- Hanyu Pinyin: Xiàmén guǐdào jiāotōng yī hào xiàn
- Wade–Giles: Hsia^{4}-mên^{2} kui^{3}-tao^{4} chiao^{1}-t‘ung^{1} i^{1} hao^{4} hsien^{4}
- IPA: [ɕjâ.mə̌n kwèɪ.tâʊ tɕjáʊ.tʰʊ́ŋ í xâʊ ɕjɛ̂n]
Yue: Cantonese
- Yale Romanization: Hahmùhn gwáidouh gāautūng yāt houh sin
- Jyutping: haa6 mun4 gwai2 dou6 gaau1 tung1 jat1 hou6 sin3
- IPA: [ha˨.mun˩ kʷɐj˧˥.tɔw˨ kaw˥.tʰʊŋ˥ jɐt̚˥ hɔw˨ sin˧]
Southern Min
- Hokkien POJ: Ē-mn̂g Kúi-tō Kau-thong it hō soàⁿ

Line 1 of the Xiamen Metro is a subway line in Xiamen. The first section, running from Yannei to Zhenhai Road, has 24 stations and is 30.3 kilometres (18.8 mi) long. It began operations on 31 December 2017.This is the first subway line in China which has a sea crossing bridge section.

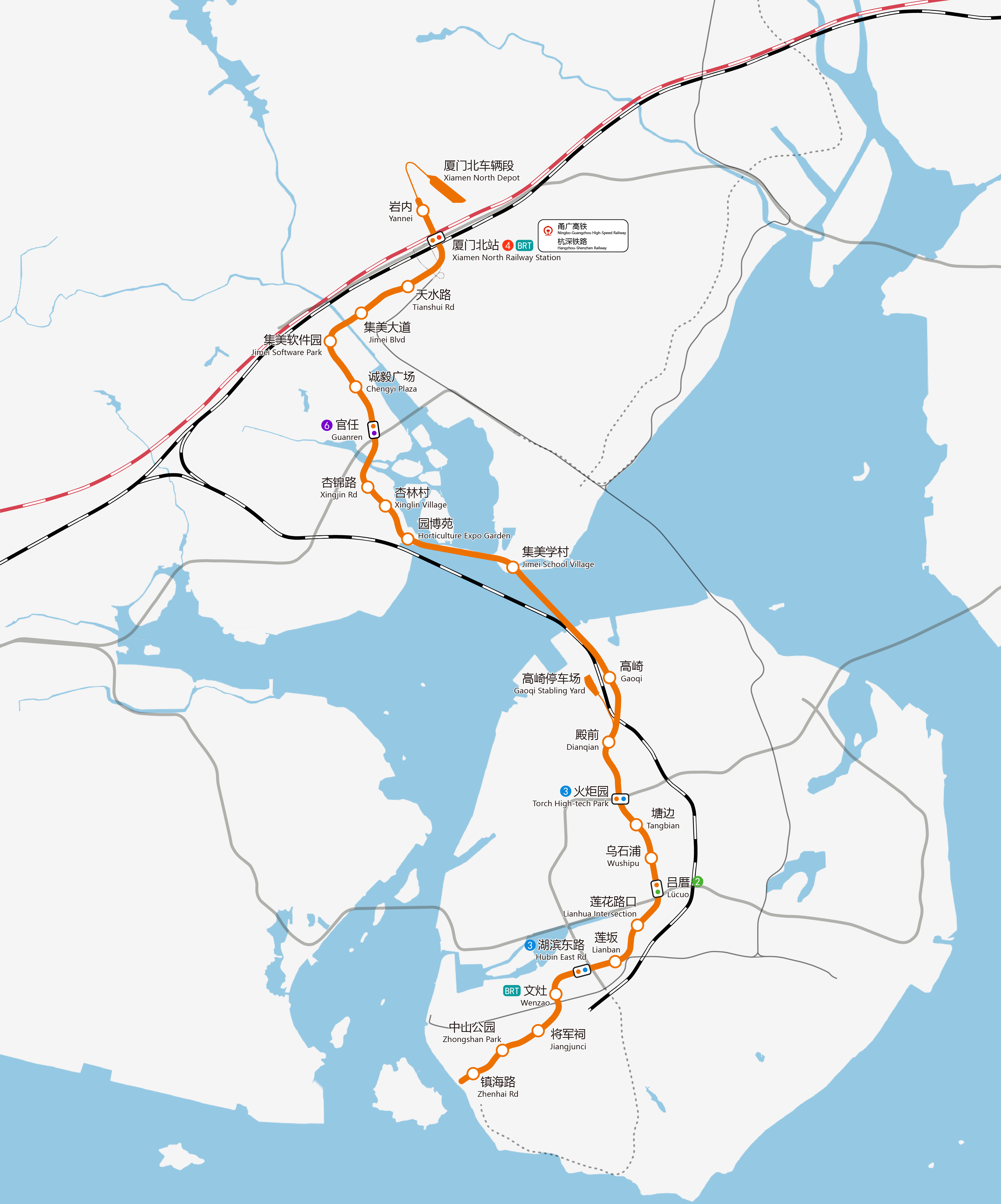
Line 1 map

== History ==
The 30.3-kilometre long, 24-station first phase of the line commenced construction on 1 April 2014 and tunnelling works were completed in March 2017. Trial runs were held from 6 October 2017 to 11 October 2017 and the line opened to the public on 31 December 2017.

=== Opening timeline ===
| Segment | Commencement | Length | Station(s) | Name |
|---|---|---|---|---|
| Yannei — Zhenhai Rd | 31 December 2017 | 30.30 km (18.83 mi) | 24 | Phase 1 |

== Stations ==
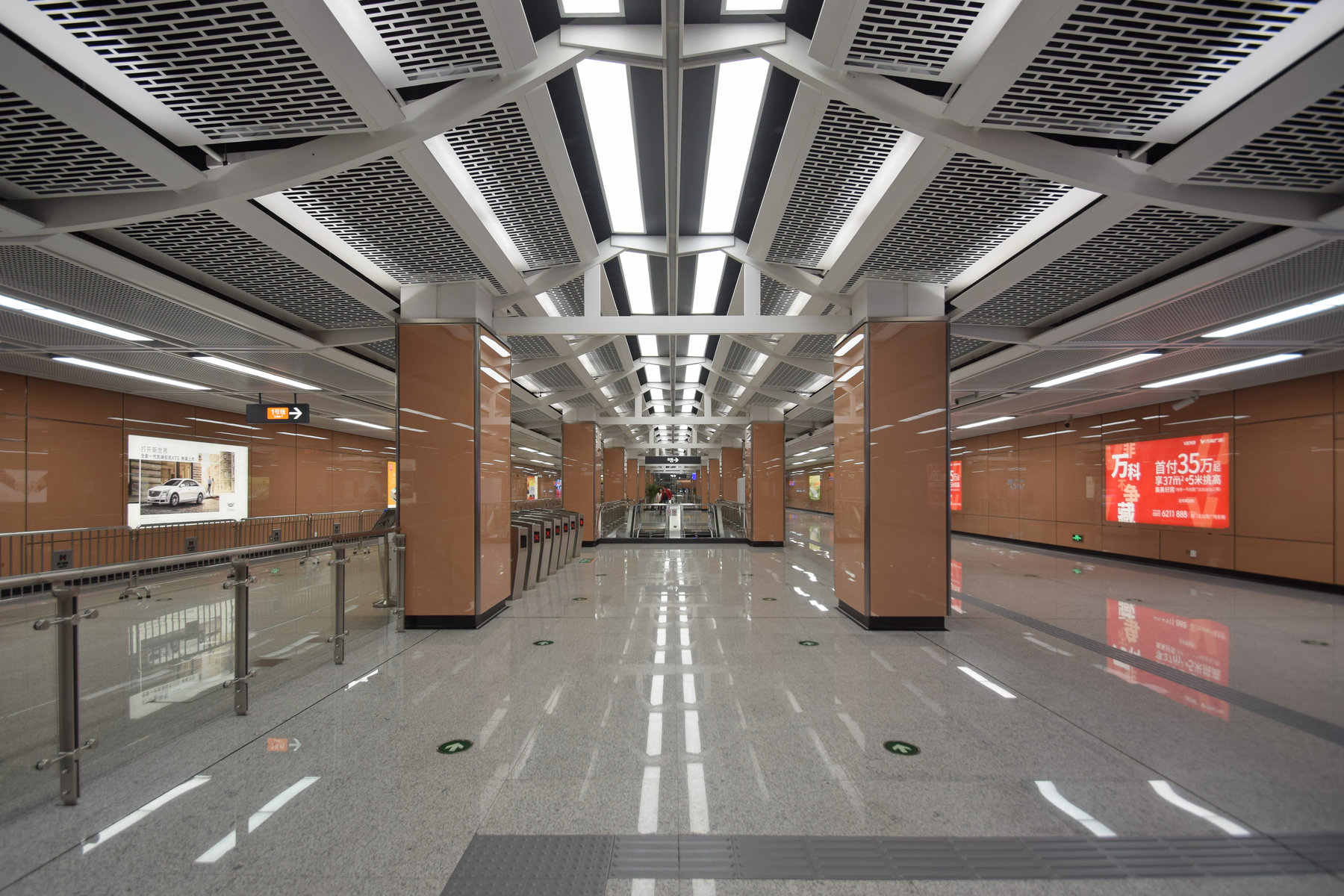
Concourse at Hubin East Road Station

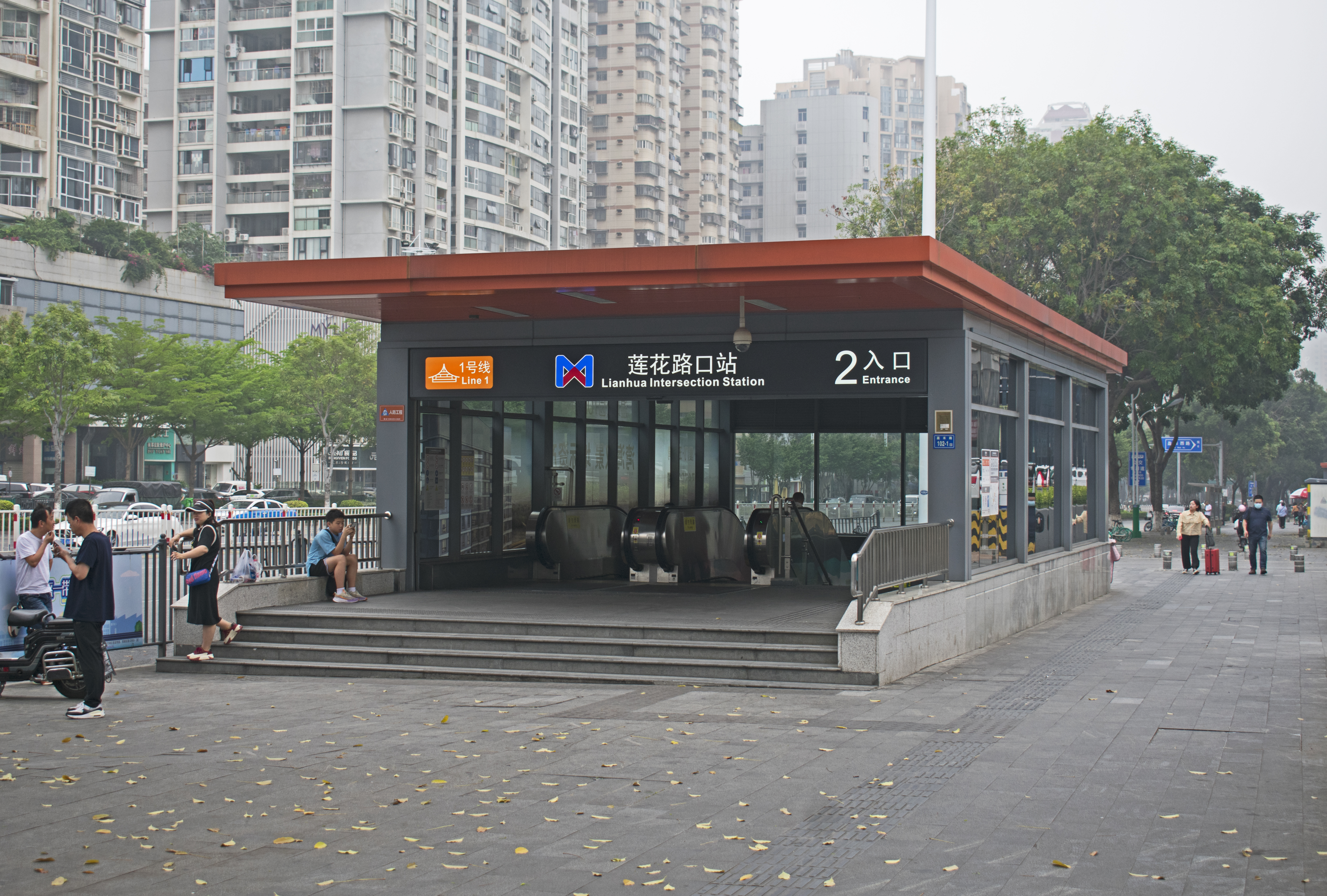
Entrance 2 to Lianhua Intersection Station

| Station name | | | Connections | Distance km | | Location |
| English | Hàn-jī | Pe̍h-ōe-jī | Connections | Distance km | | Location |
|---|---|---|---|---|---|---|
| Yannei | 岩内 | Giâm-lāi | | 0.00 | 0.00 | Jimei |
| Xiamen North Railway Station | 厦门北站 | Ē-mn̂g Pak-chām | XKS Xiamen BRT | 0.85 | 0.85 | Jimei |
| Tianshui Road | 天水路 | Thian-súi-lō͘ | | 1.61 | 2.46 | Jimei |
| Jimei Boulevard | 集美大道 | Chi̍p-bí Tōa-tō͘ | | 1.26 | 3.72 | Jimei |
| Jimei Software Park | 集美软件园 | Chi̍p-bí Nńg-kiāⁿ-hn̂g | | 1.07 | 4.79 | Jimei |
| Chengyi Plaza | 诚毅广场 | Sêng-gī Kóng-tiûⁿ | | 1.32 | 6.11 | Jimei |
| Guanren | 官任 | Koaⁿ-līm | | 1.16 | 7.27 | Jimei |
| Xingjin Road | 杏锦路 | Hēng-kím-lō͘ | | 1.55 | 8.82 | Jimei |
| Xinglin Village | 杏林村 | Hēng-nâ-chhng | | 0.64 | 9.46 | Jimei |
| Horticulture Expo Garden | 园博苑 | Hn̂g-phok-oán | | 1.07 | 10.53 | Jimei |
| Jimei School Village | 集美学村 | Chi̍p-bí Ha̍k-chhng | | 2.61 | 13.14 | Jimei |
| Gaoqi | 高崎 | Ko-kiâ | | 3.82 | 16.96 | Huli |
| Dianqian | 殿前 | Tàiⁿ-châiⁿ | | 1.54 | 18.50 | Huli |
| Torch Hi-Tech Park | 火炬园 | Hé-kū-hn̂g | 3 | 1.34 | 19.84 | Huli |
| Tangbian | 塘边 | Tn̂g-piⁿ | | 0.88 | 20.72 | Huli |
| Wushipu | 乌石浦 | O͘-chio̍h-phó͘ | | 0.97 | 21.69 | Huli |
| Lücuo | 吕厝 | Lū-chhù | 2 | 0.80 | 22.49 | Siming |
| Lianhua Intersection | 莲花路口 | Liân-hoe Lō͘-kháu | | 1.08 | 23.57 | Siming |
| Lianban | 莲坂 | Lâu-poáⁿ | | 1.04 | 24.61 | Siming |
| Hubin East Road | 湖滨东路 | Ô͘-pin Tang-lō͘ | 3 | 0.71 | 25.32 | Siming |
| Wenzao | 文灶 | Môa-chàu | Xiamen BRT | 1.34 | 26.66 | Siming |
| Jiangjunci | 将军祠 | Chiong-kun-sû | | 0.82 | 27.48 | Siming |
| Zhongshan Park | 中山公园 | Tiong-san Kong-hn̂g | | 1.23 | 28.71 | Siming |
| Zhenhai Road | 镇海路 | Tìn-hái-lō͘ | | 0.88 | 29.59 | Siming |

== Rolling stock ==
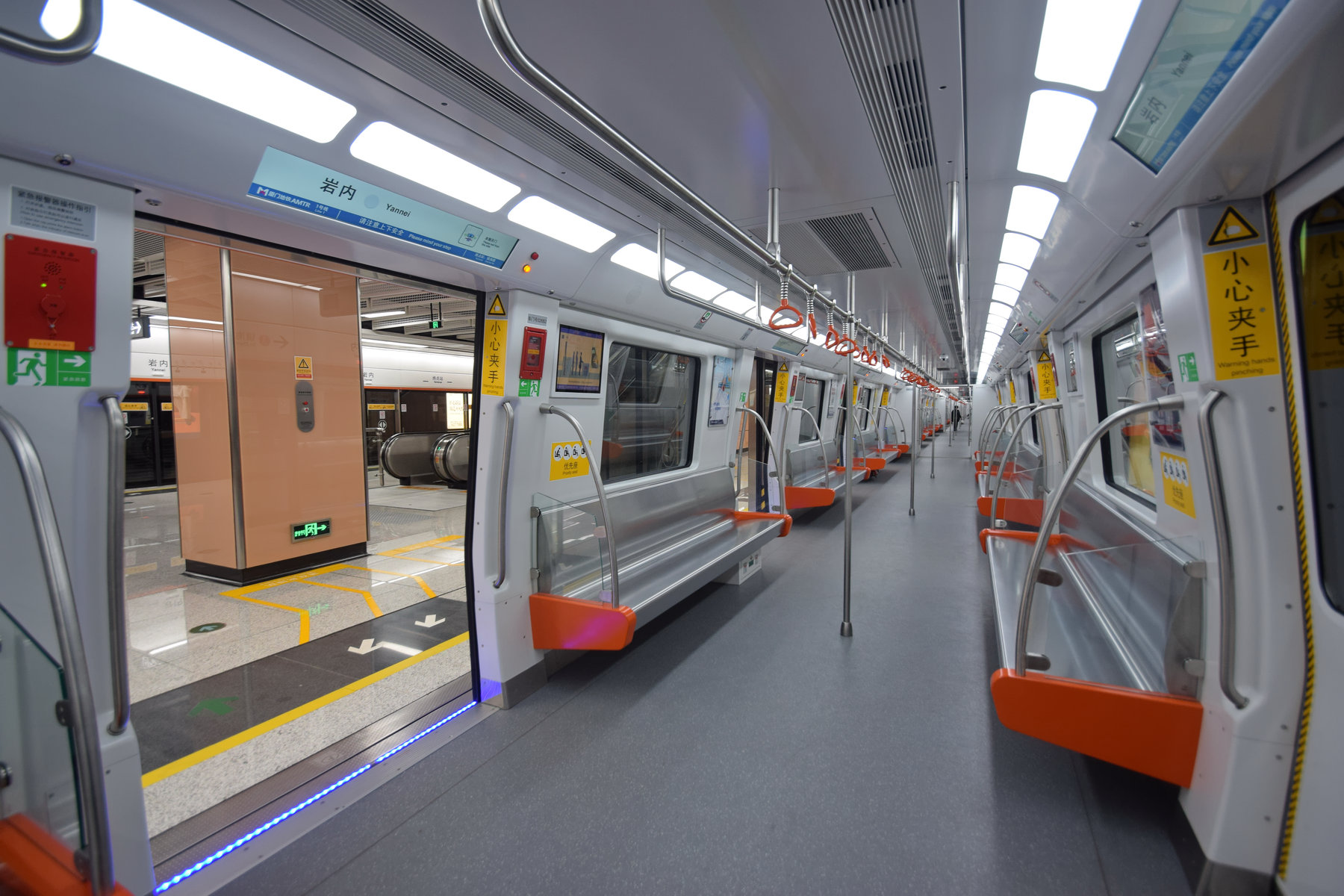
Interior of rolling stock

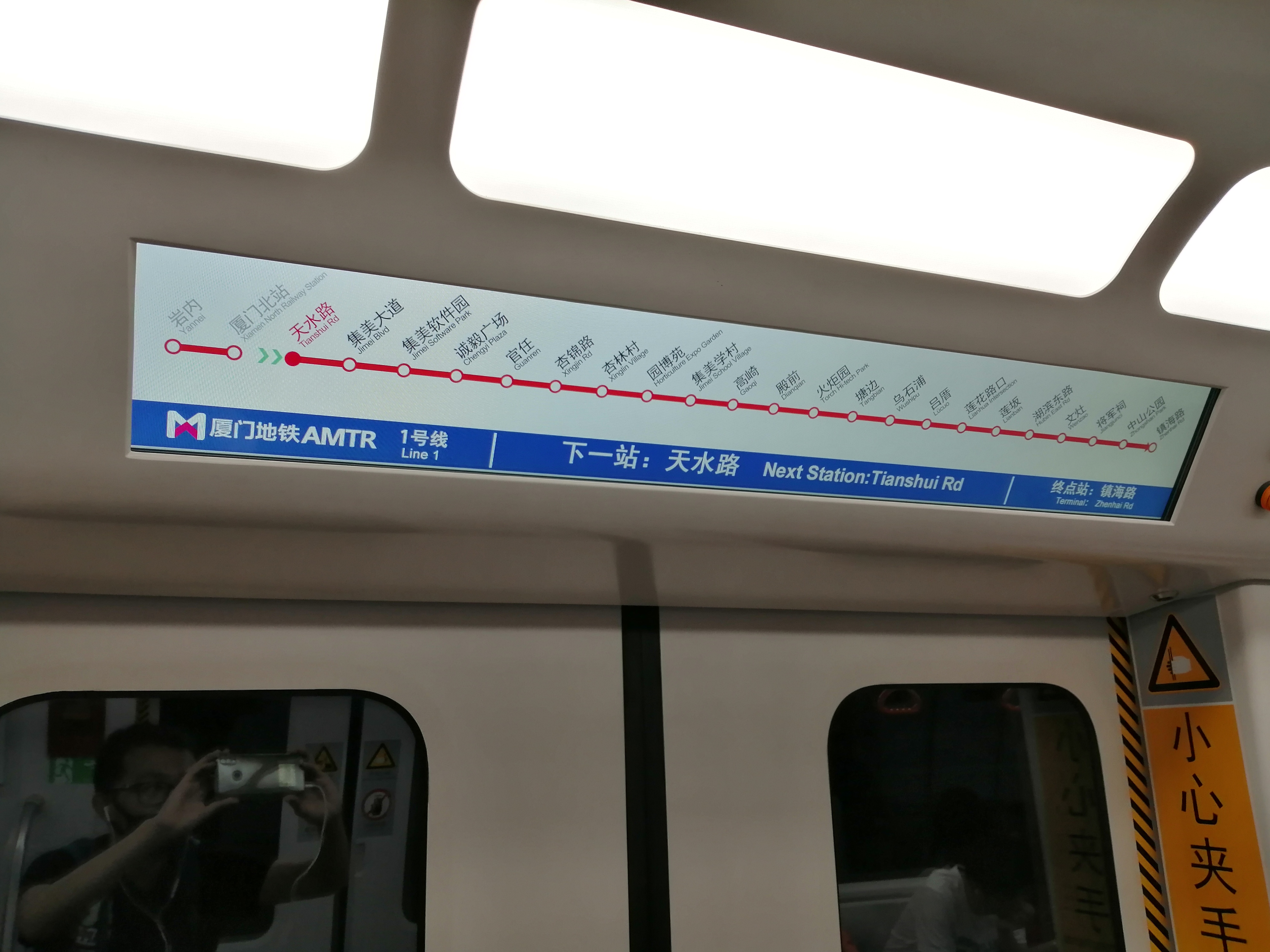
Line 1 interior display

Services on the line are provided by a fleet of six-car, aluminum-bodied trains manufactured by CRRC. These trains are 118.7 m (389 ft) long and 2.8 m (9.2 ft) wide, with a capacity of up to 2062 passengers.
