= Xiamen BRT =

Bus system in Xiamen, China

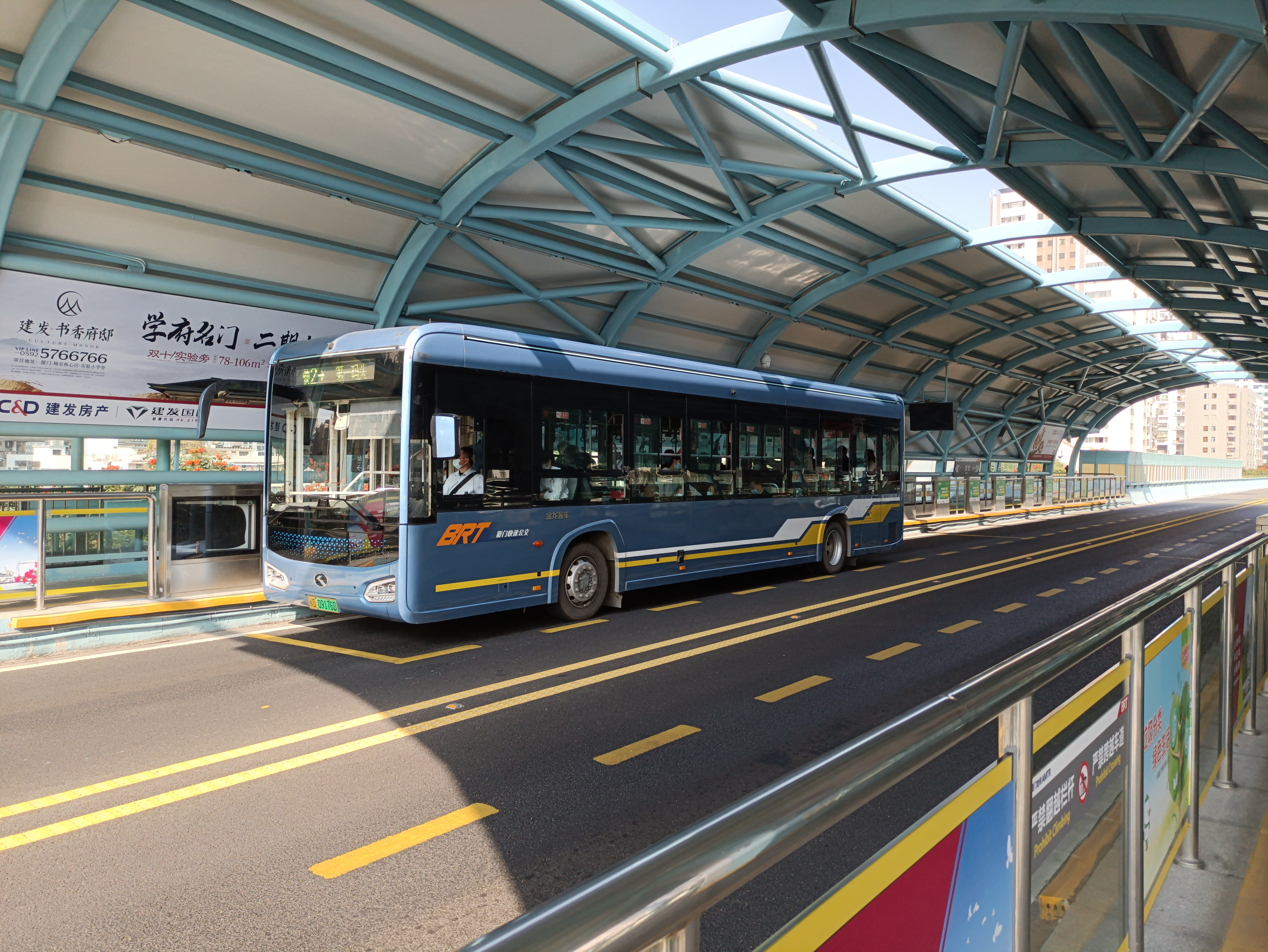
- A King Long XMQ6125AGBEVL running on BRT Line 2

Overview
- Locale: Xiamen (Amoy)
- Transit type: Elevated Bus rapid transit
- Number of lines: 5 (incl. 1 express line)
- Number of stations: 47

Operation
- Began operation: August 31, 2008

Technical
- System length: 67.4 km (41.9 mi)
- Top speed: 60 km/h (37 mph)
System map

Xiamen Bus Rapid Transit
- Simplified Chinese: 厦门快速公交
- Traditional Chinese: 廈門快速公交
Transcriptions
Standard Mandarin
- Hanyu Pinyin: Xiàmén kuaìsù gōngjiāo
Southern Min
- Hokkien POJ: Ē-mn̂g-khòai-sok-kong-kau

Xiamen's Bus Rapid Transit (BRT) is a bus rapid transit system in Xiamen, Fujian, China. It was formally put into operation on August 31, 2008, and is considered China's first elevated BRT network. Eventually the system will be rebuilt into an elevated metro network and be integrated with the Xiamen Metro.

The system uses some dedicated elevated roadways as well as dedicated lanes on bridges which allow buses to reach speeds of 60 km/h (37 mph). Due to its success, the city has won honors as the China's top transportation city for six years running with more than 30% of trips taken by public transport.

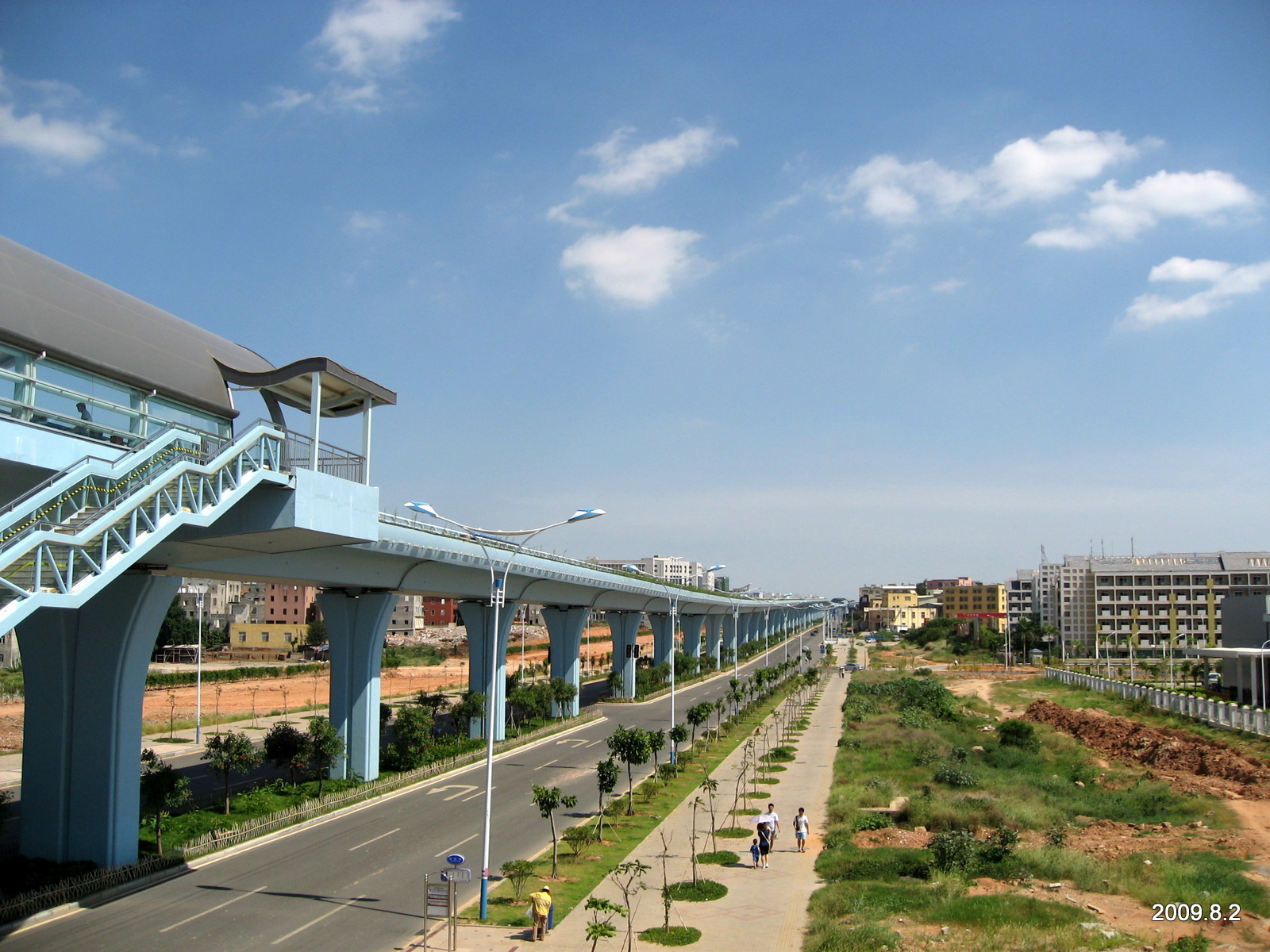
Xiamen BRT viaduct, 2009

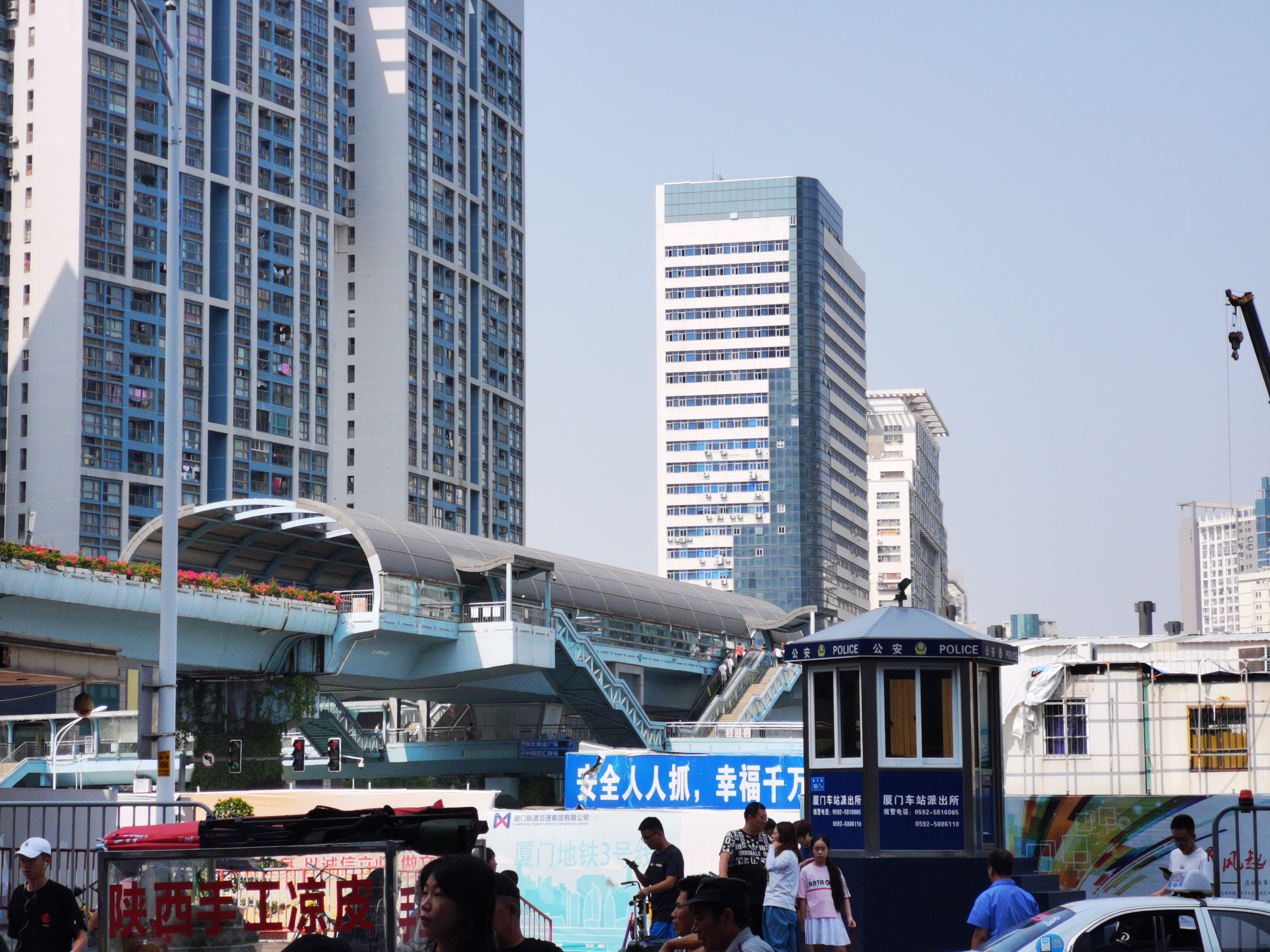
Xiamen BRT Railway Station, 2019

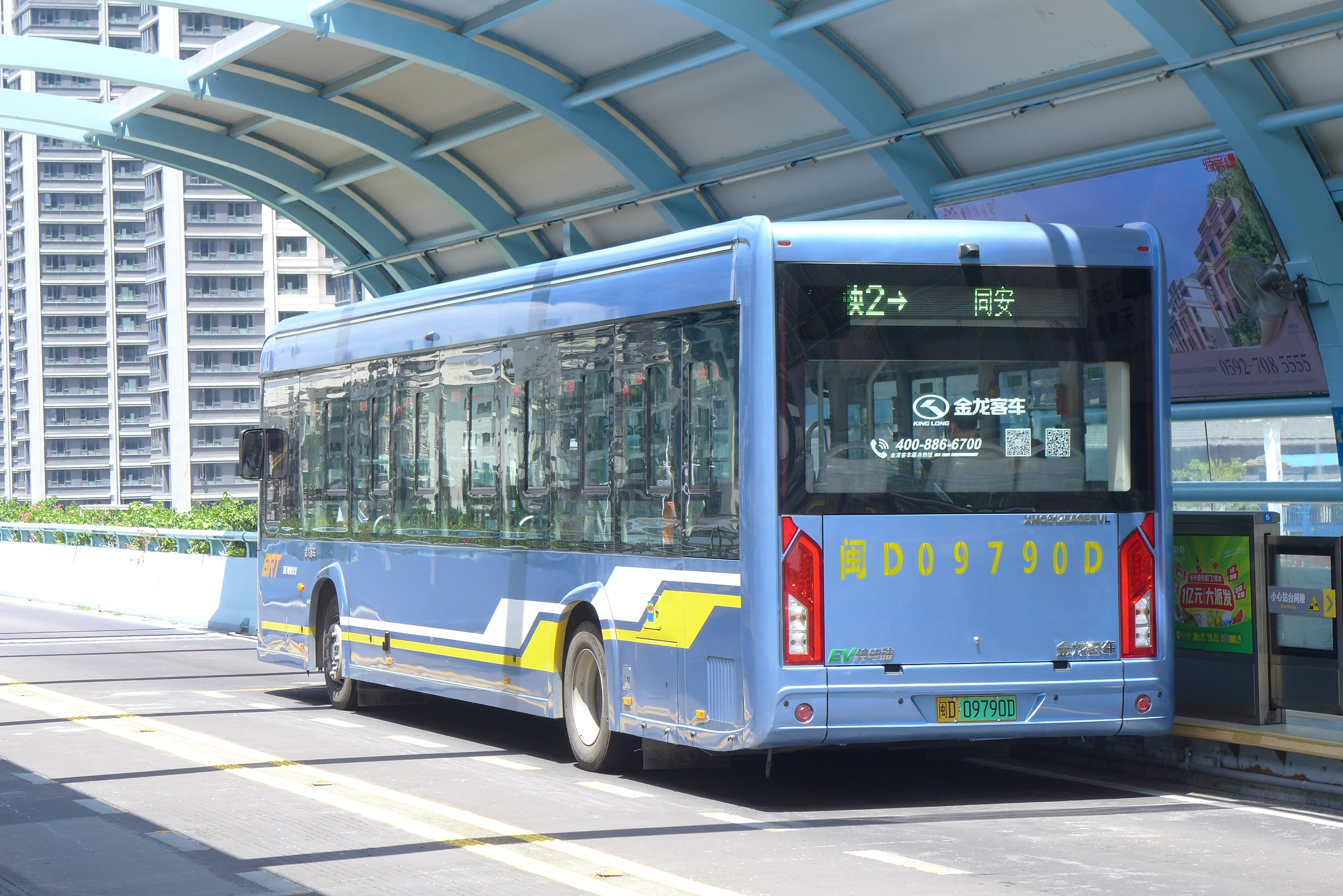
Xiamen BRT Bus, 2020

== Lines ==
The system currently has 7 operational lines.

=== BRT 1 ===
It runs from No.1 Port to Xiamen North Railway Station in Jimei. It is 21 stops over 33.4 km and takes about 90 minutes.

BRT 1 Interchange runs from Diyi Matou (No.1 Port) and ends at Wenxing Dong Rd (Qianpu). It is 17 bus stops over 18.7 km and takes about 50 minutes.

Station

- 第一码头站 (Diyi Matou Station)
- 开禾路口站 (Kaihe Lukou Station)
- 思北站 (Sibei Station)
- 斗西路站 (Douxi Lukou Station)
- 二市站 (Ershi Station)
- 文灶站 (Wenzao Station) Line 1
- 火车站 (Xiamen Railway Station)
- 莲坂站 (Lianban Station)
- 龙山桥站 (Longshanqiao Station)
- 卧龙晓城站 (Wolong Xiaocheng Station)
- 东芳山庄站 (Dongfang Shanzhuang Station)
- 蔡塘站 (Caitang Station) Line 2
- 金山站 (Jinshan Station)
- 穆厝站 (Mucuo Station)
- 双十中学站 (Double Ten Middle School Station)
- 县后站(机场) (Xianhou Station (Airport))
- 集美大桥南站 (Jimei Daqiao South Station)
- 嘉庚体育馆站 (Jiageng Sport Center Station)
- 诚毅学院站 (Chengyi Institute Station)
- 华侨大学站 (Huaqiao University Station)
- 田厝站 (Tiancuo Station) (planned)
- 厦门北站 (Xiamen North Railway Station) Line 1

=== BRT 2 ===
It runs from Diyi Matou (No.1 Port) and ends at Xike. It has 9 stops over 15.3 km and takes about 40 minutes.

The fare is calculated by distance travelled. The basic fare is 0.3rmb per km in non-air conditioned buses and 0.6rmb in air conditioned buses.

Station

- 第一码头站 (Diyi Matou Station)
- 开禾路口站 (Kaihe Lukou Station)
- 思北站 (Sibei Station)
- 斗西路站 (Douxi Lukou Station)
- 二市站 (Ershi Station)
- 文灶站 (Wenzao Station) AMTR 1
- 火车站 (Xiamen Railway Station)
- 莲坂站 (Lianban Station)
- 龙山桥站 (Longshanqiao Station)
- 卧龙晓城站 (Wolong Xiaocheng Station)
- 东芳山庄站 (Dongfang Shanzhuang Station)
- 蔡塘站 (Caitang Station) AMTR 2
- 金山站 (Jinshan Station)
- 穆厝站 (Mucuo Station)
- 双十中学站 (Shuangshi Zhongxue Station)
- 县后站(机场) (Xianhou Station (Airport))
- 集美大桥南站 (Jimei Daqiao South Station)
- 凤林站 (Fenglin Station)
- 东垵站 (Dong'an Station) (under construction)
- 后田站 (Houtian Station) (under construction)
- 东亭站 (Dongting Station) (under construction)
- 美峰站 (Meifeng Station) (under construction)
- 下店站 (Xiadian Station) (under construction)
- 潘涂站 (Pantu Station)
- 西柯站 (Xike Station)

=== BRT 3 ===
It runs from No.1 Port to Qianpu.

Station

- 第一码头站 (Diyi Matou Station)
- 开禾路口站 (Kaihe Lukou Station)
- 思北站 (Sibei Station)
- 斗西路站 (Douxi Lukou Station)
- 二市站 (Ershi Station)
- 文灶站 (Wenzao Station) Line 1
- 火车站 (Xiamen Railway Station)
- 莲坂站 (Lianban Station)
- 龙山桥站 (Longshanqiao Station)
- 卧龙晓城站 (Wolong Xiaocheng Station)
- 东芳山庄站 (Dongfang Shanzhuang Station)
- 洪文站 (Hongwen Station)
- 前埔枢纽站 (Qianpu Station)

Cancelled stops:

- 会展中心站 (Exhibition Center Station)
- 会展中心北站 (Exhibition Center North Station)
- 会展中心南站 (Exhibition Centre South Station)
- 文兴东路站 (Wenxing Donglu Station)
- 前埔站南 (South Qianpu Station)

== Fire ==
On June 7, 2013, a mass murder-suicide attack occurred on a Xiamen BRT bus. A bus operating for the Xiamen BRT caught fire and exploded on an elevated lane near the Jinshan stop; 47 people died and 34 were injured.
