= Haicang, Xiamen =

Haicang 海沧区 Hai-ts'ang
- District
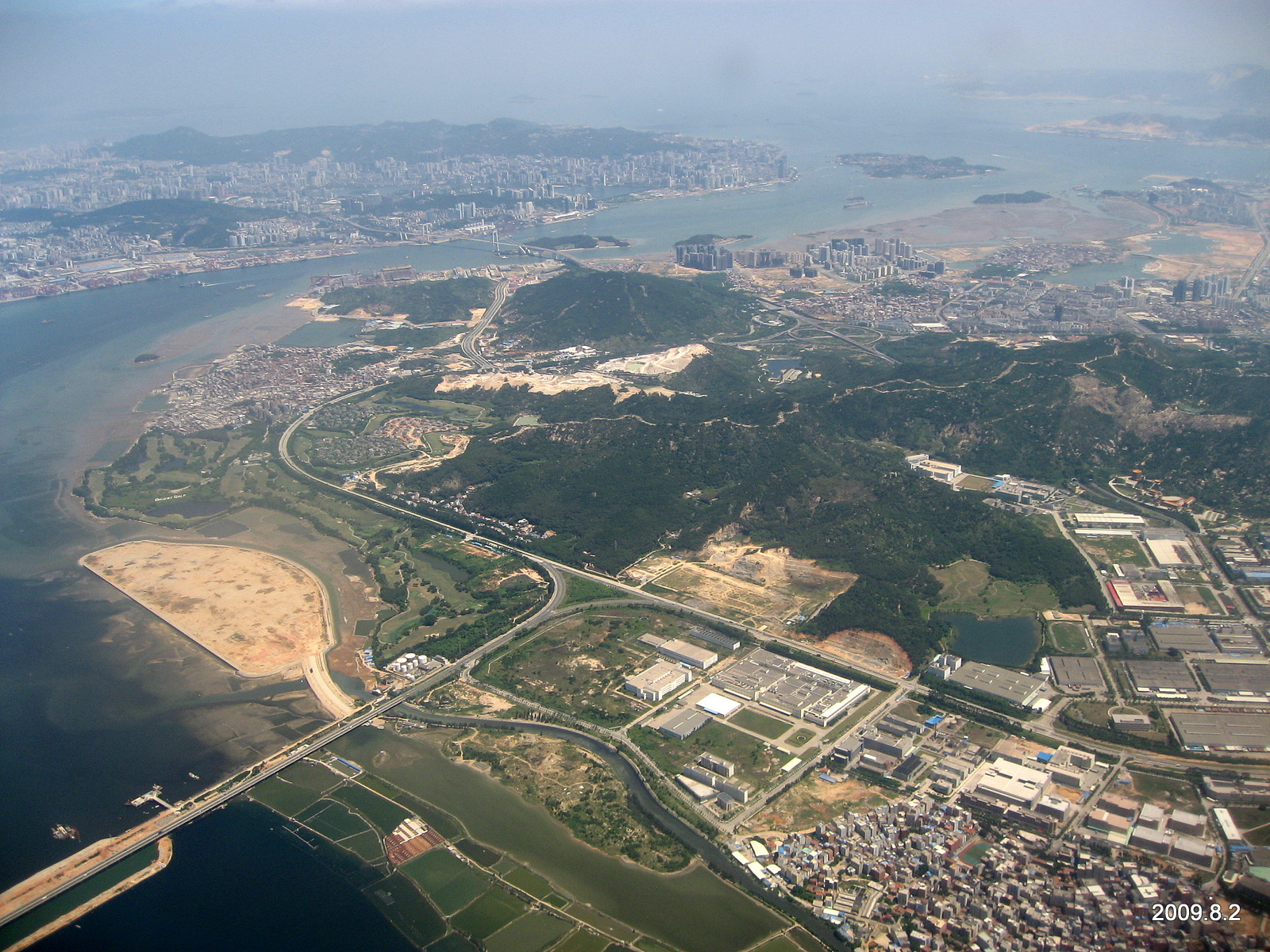
- An aerial view of Haicang District, looking from the northwest. In the bottom left, one can see Xinyang Bridge, connecting Haicang with Jimei District (not in the pricture). Xiamen Island, connected to Haicand District by the Haicang Bridge, is in the background left; the small Gulangyu Island, to the right of it

- Location in Fujian
- Coordinates: 24°29′06.4″N 118°02′29.7″E
- Country: People's Republic of China
- Province: Fujian
- Sub-provincial city: Xiamen

Area
  - Total: 176.9 km^{2} (68.3 sq mi)

Population (2020)
  - Total: 582,519
  - Density: 3,293/km^{2} (8,529/sq mi)
- Time zone: UTC+8 (China Standard)

Haicang (simplified Chinese: 海沧区; traditional Chinese: 海滄區; pinyin: Hǎicāng Qū; Pe̍h-ōe-jī: Hái-chhng-khu) is one of the six county-level districts of Xiamen, People's Republic of China, and one of the four located on the mainland proper, as opposed to on Xiamen Island.

== History ==
Haicang has always been the port of call for incoming trade to Xiamen. In May 1989, the Chinese government established the Haicang investment zone as a petrochemical industrial area within Xinglin District for Taiwanese business magnate Wang Yongqing. Since then, Haicang has developed into a world class port, which serves as an industrial and agricultural base for exports.

== Geography ==
The Haicang District Investment Zone is located on the lowermost left (or northern) bank of the Jiulongjiang River, to the west of Xiamen Island. The left bank provides 5 kilometres (3.1 mi) of coastline with shallow water of 10 metres (33 ft).

The urban (eastern) area of the District is separated from Xiamen Island by an 870 metres (2,850 ft)-stretch of water crossed by the Haicang Bridge.

== Administration ==
The Haicang District was established in 2003 on the bulk of the territory of the old Xinglin District, which had already pipelined a Taiwanese-invested Investment Zone (台商投资区).

=== Civil ===
==== Subdistricts ====
- Haicang (Hai-ts'ang) (海沧街道)
- Xinyang (新阳街道)
- Songyu (嵩屿街道)
- Dongfu (东孚街道)

==== Others ====
- Haicang Govt Farm (海沧农场)
- Number One Govt Farm (第一农场)
- Tianzhu Mountain Govt Forest (天竺山林场)

=== Investment Zone ===
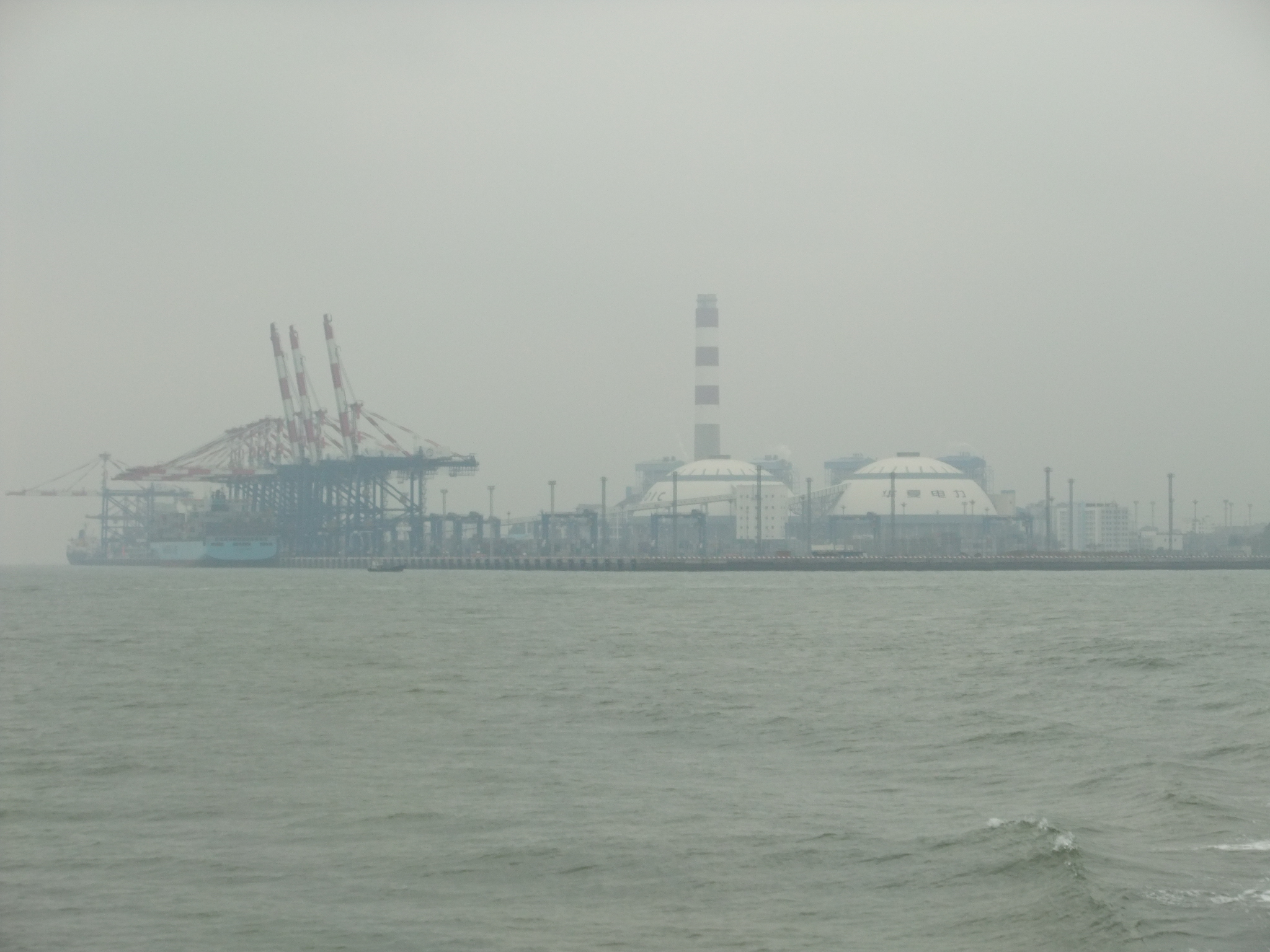
Port facilities at the southeastern promontory of Haicang District

During its planning, the district executive divided its Investment Zone into functional areas:

- Haicang Port covers an area of 12.4 square kilometres (4.8 sq mi). Developmental focus is on port transportation, the energy industry and warehousing (bonded storage). As many as 36 storage facilities capable of handing over 10,000 metric tons will be built (ten facilities in the first phase). The port railway spur of the Yingtan-Xiamen Railway was completed in 1999. The 5 kilometer deep water port is predicted to handle 90 million tons of goods annually.
- Southern Industrial Area (南部工业区) is a flat region that covers 17.7 square kilometres (6.8 sq mi) and is adjacent to the port area. Developmental focus is on technology, especially capital-intensive heavy industry - machinery, electronics, metallurgy, and chemical fibre industries. Middle and downstream petro-chemical projects are especially favoured.
- The Residential Area has a planned area of 27.6 square kilometres (10.7 sq mi), and will be a major suburb of Xiamen. Developmental focus is on real estate and tertiary industry. There are already facilities such as banks, commerce and trade centers, tourist locations, public communication areas, primary and secondary schools, professional training centers, hospitals, hotels, recreation, entertainment and cafes.
- Xinyang Industrial Area (新阳工业区) is a key industrial area for both Haicang and the whole Xiamen municipal region. The planned area is 29.6 square kilometres (11.4 sq mi); developmental focus is on capital, technology, and small to medium industries - machinery, electronics, fine chemicals, plastic, rubber and new building materials. Infrastructure facilities, including roads, water supply, power supply, post, drainage and waste discharge, are top-notch. There are commercial, real estate and public facilities. Over a hundred projects have planned in the area, and over thirty are in production; when all have reached full production, their total value will be around 10 billion yuan.
- Dongfu Industrial Area (东孚工业区) and Xiamen Export Processing Zone (AEPZ, 出口加工区) have subsidiary, special roles in the District's Investment Zone plan.

== Economy ==
The government of the Haicang Investment Zone actively invites foreign investment in high technology and capital intensive industries with emphasis on electronics, manufacturing, petrochemicals, machinery, refined chemicals, new building materials, biotechnology and pharmaceuticals.
