= Xiamen Bay =

Coordinates: 24.50°N 118.25°E

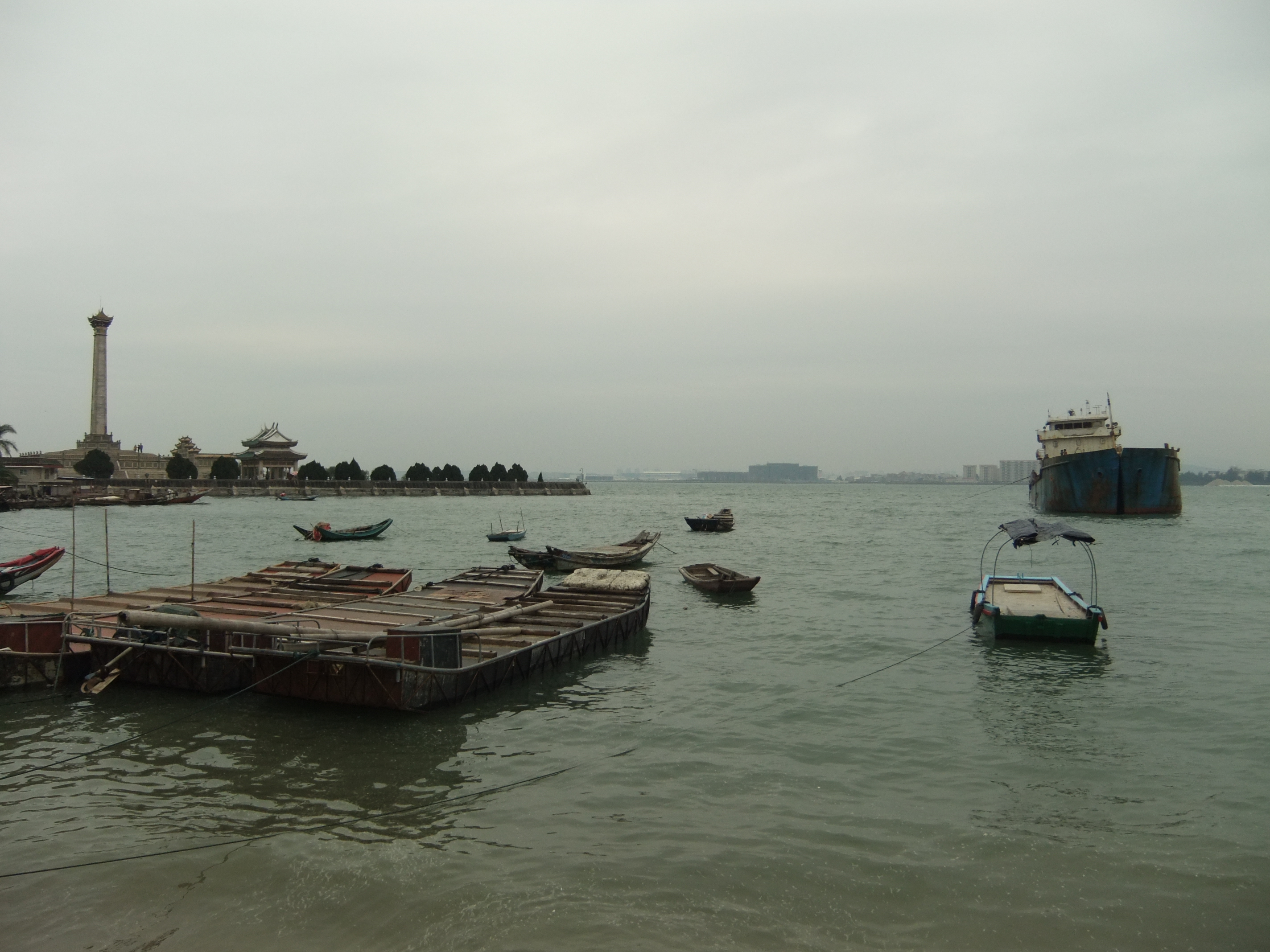
- Xiamen Bay near Kah Kee Park in Xiamen's Jimei District
- Traditional Chinese: 廈門灣
- Simplified Chinese: 厦门湾
Transcriptions
Standard Mandarin
- Hanyu Pinyin: Xiàmén Wān
- Wade–Giles: Hsia-men Wan
Southern Min
- Hokkien POJ: Ē-mn̂g-ôan

Xiamen Bay, formerly known as Amoy Bay, is a partially enclosed bay off the coast of Xiamen in China's Fujian Province. It is bound by the Kinmen Islands and the Taiwan Strait.

== Geography ==
The bay is formed by down-faulted depressed block of undersea bed creating a submerged bay.

The water depth around the bay range from 6 to 25 metres and has a deep water coastal area of 30 km.

== Economy ==
Xiamen Bay is an important economic region for Xiamen as well as the whole of Fujian Province. The bay has numerous port, transport infrastructure, shipbuilding and petrochemical industries. The local government has set up various development areas such as the Xiamen Bay Photoelectric Industrial City to promote economic development.

Due to rapid economic development and industrialization in Xiamen, the bay has been tested for traces of heavy metal contamination.
