= Dianqian station =

Metro station in Xiamen, China

Dianqian 殿前
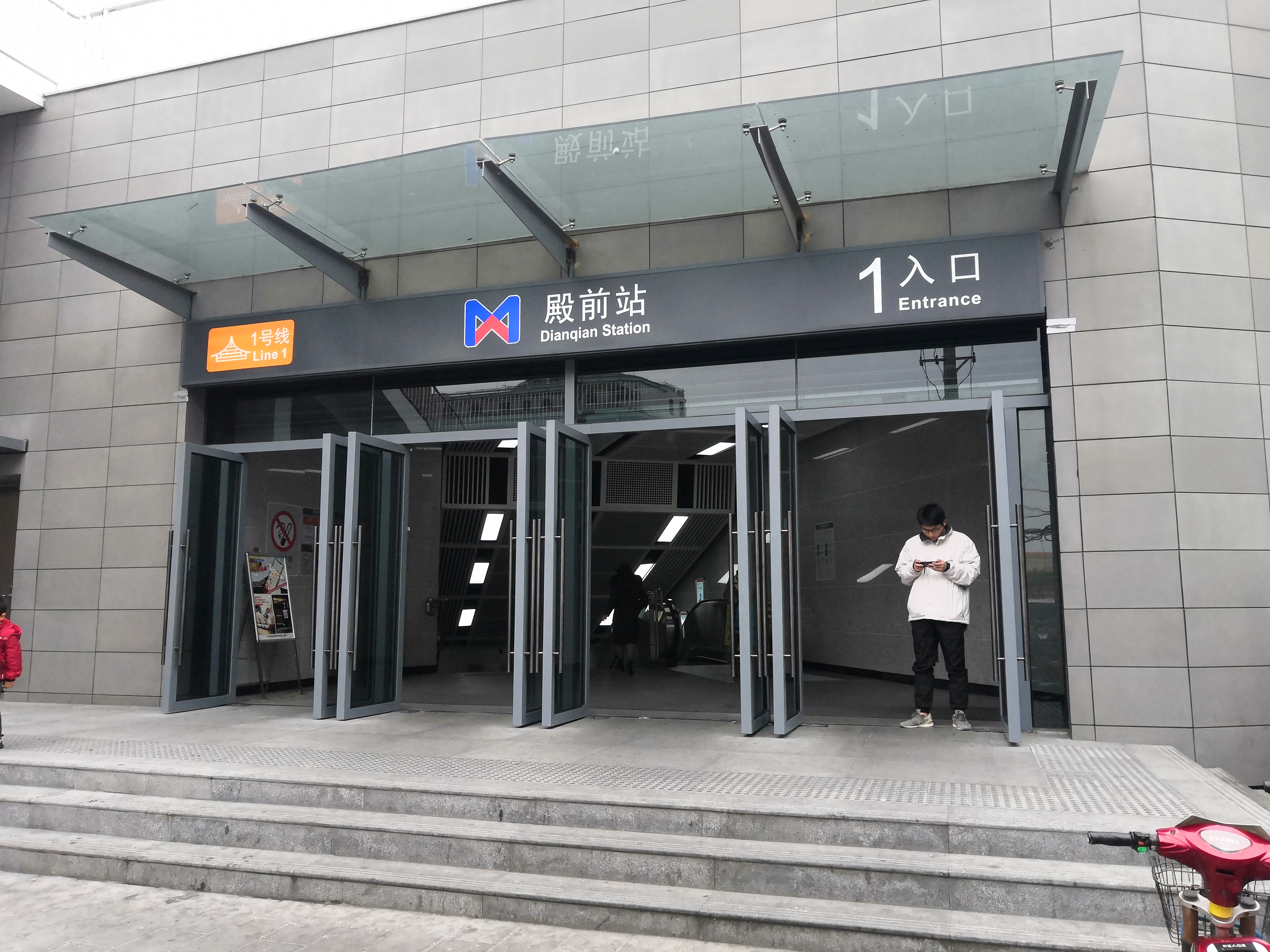
- Exit 1 of Dianqian station in 2020

General information
- Location: Jiahe Road, Huli District, Xiamen; Fujian (China)
- Coordinates: 24.5285°N 118.1116°E
- System: Xiamen Metro station
- Owner: Xiamen Metro
- Operator: Xiamen Metro
- Line: Line 1
- Platforms: 2 (1 island platform)
- Tracks: 2

Construction
- Structure type: Underground
- Platform levels: 3
- Accessible: Yes

Other information
- Status: Operational

History
- Opened: December 31, 2017

Services
| Preceding station | Xiamen Metro | Following station |
|---|---|---|
| Gaoqi towards Yannei | Line 1 | Torch Hi-Tech Park towards Zhenhai Road |
Location

Dianqian station is an underground metro station on the Xiamen Metro. Formerly named Gaodian station, it is located on Jiahe Road in Huli District. It is served by Line 1 and opened on 31 December 2017.

== History ==
Construction barriers were set up at the station, then named Gaodian station, in April 2014, with another layer of barriers set up in September. The station was built in a geologically complex area, where isolated boulder layers accounted for over 20% on average, posing challenges for the construction of the foundation of the station. To address this, multiple blasting operations were conducted to remove isolated boulders before earth excavation began in June 2015. The soil between this station and Torch Hi-Tech Park station primarily consisted of weathered granite residual soil which is rich in groundwater. As a result, during construction, the pipe well method was used to lower the groundwater level while controlling settlement around the station's surrounding areas.

On May 10, 2016, the main structure of Gaodian Station was topped out. By the end of June, the barricaded area was reduced to minimize disruption to surrounding road traffic. In mid-September, Typhoon Meranti damaged the station's enclosure, which was repaired by September 18. On March 13, 2017, according to a report by Fujian South East Net about the full tunnel breakthrough of Line 1, Gaodian Station was renamed Dianqian Station.

The station opened on December 31, 2017, as part of the opening of Line 1.

In July 2020, workers carried out contact wire replacement operations at the station due to excessive wear. In 2024, Dianqian Station became one of the first three stations selected for a pilot program between Xiamen Metro and local courier companies. During off-peak hours, metro trains helped out-of-town tourists transport their luggage to transportation hubs such as train stations and Gaoqi Airport.

== Station details ==
Dianqian station has an area of 24,980 square metres (29,880 sq yd), with a length of 263.7 metres (288.4 yd) and a width of 21 metres (23 yd). The station has three underground levels and the base is 26.5 metres (29.0 yd) deep. There are five exits to the station. Before Line 1 started trial operations, an environmental enhancement project was carried out on an area of over 4,000 square metres (4,800 sq yd) near Exit 5. Green spaces were established on both sides, with plantings such as silk floss trees and frangipani. A scenic wall made of Minnan-style red bricks was constructed next to the walkway; only this station and Zhongshan Park station featured such walls beside their entrances.
