= Jimei =

Jimei may refer to:

- Jimei Bridge, Xiamen
- Jimei District (集美区) a district of Xiamen, China.
- Jimei University (集美大学) a university in Xiamen, China.
