= Chiyu Banking Corporation =

Bank incorporated in Hong Kong

Coordinates: 22.2839°N 114.1560°E

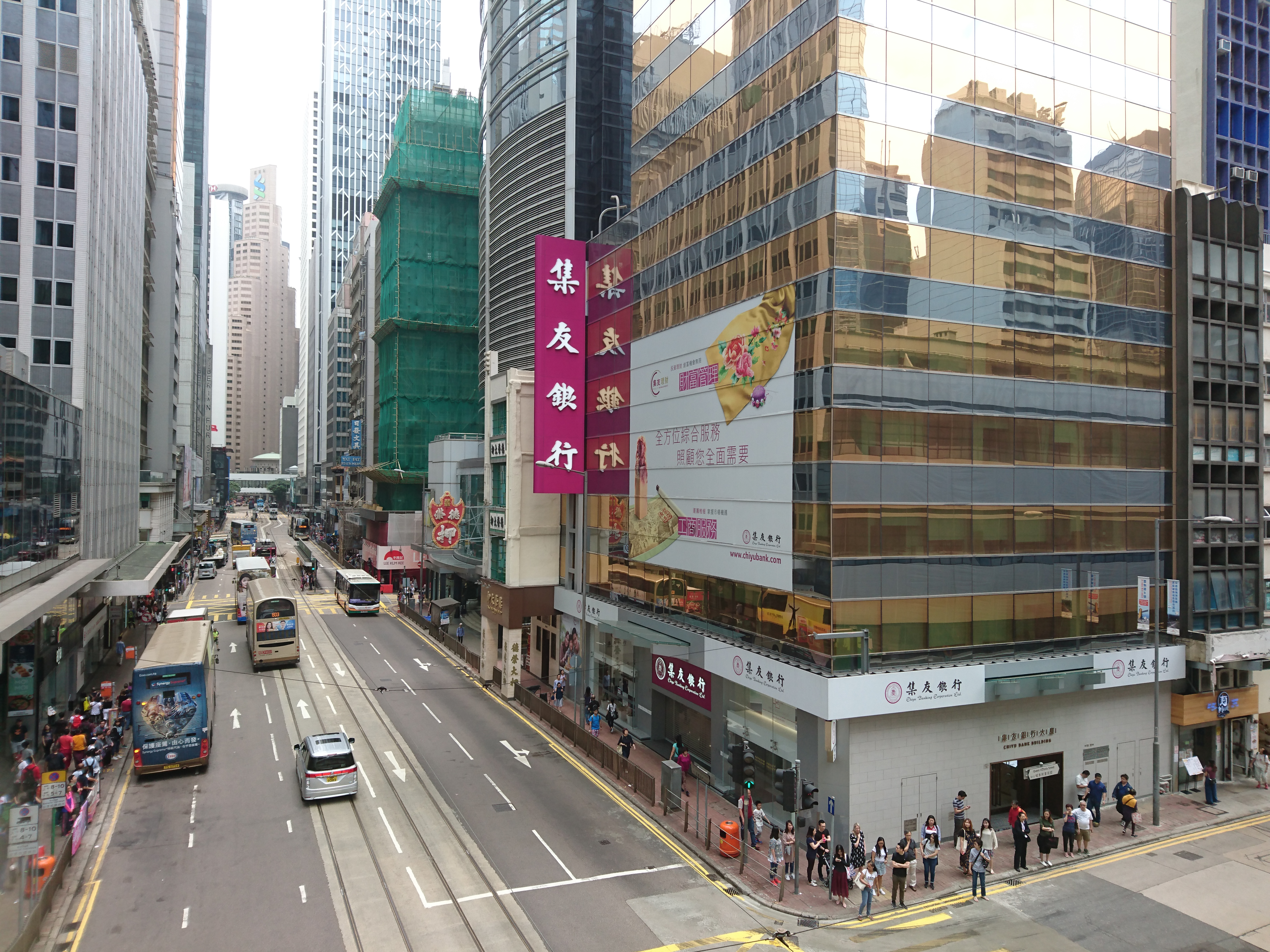
- Trade name: Chiyu Bank
- Native name: 集友銀行
- Type: Subsidiary
- Founded: 15 July 1947; 79 years ago
- Founder: Tan Kah Kee
- Area served: Hong Kong
- Parent: Xiamen International Bank

Chinese name
- Traditional Chinese: 集友銀行
- Simplified Chinese: 集友银行
Transcriptions
Standard Mandarin
- Hanyu Pinyin: Jíyǒu yínháng
Yue: Cantonese
- Yale Romanization: Jaahp yáuh ngàhn hòhng
- Jyutping: Zaap^{6} jau^{5} ngan^{4} hong^{4}

full name
- Traditional Chinese: 集友銀行有限公司
Transcriptions
- Website: www.chiyubank.com

Chiyu Banking Corporation Limited also known as Chiyu Bank is a bank incorporated in Hong Kong.

== History ==
It was founded by Tan Kah Kee on 15 July 1947, and it has 23 branches in Hong Kong and focuses on serving the community of Fujianese people in Hong Kong.

Chiyu was explicitly created by Chen to create a sustainable business with profits to be devoted to education in Xiamen and the rest of Fujian province in China. Since its founding, it has spent more than HK$1 billion in education in the province, primarily through funding Jimei University and its related schools.

== Ownership ==
Bank of China (Hong Kong) gradually accumulated a 70% stake in Chiyu in the 1970s; the rest of the bank is held by the Jimei University foundation, the government of Xiamen Municipality City and minority shareholders.

On 27 March 2017, Bank of China (Hong Kong) disposed of all of its 70.49% of interests in Chiyu, selling most of it to Xiamen International Investment Limited, a wholly owned subsidiary of Xiamen International Bank Co. Ltd, and part of it (6.18% of Chiyu) to the Committee of Jimei Schools.
