= Lee Seng Tee =

Singaporean businessman (1923–2022)

Lee Seng Tee FBA
- Born: 16 April 1923; Singapore, Straits Settlements
- Died: 29 July 2022 (aged 99); Singapore
- Education: University of Pennsylvania (BS)
- Occupation: Businessman
- Spouse: Betty Wu
- Children: 3
- Parent(s): Lee Kong Chian (father); Tan Ai Leh (mother)
- Relatives: Tan Kah Kee (maternal grandfather); Lee Seng Gee (brother); Lee Seng Wee (brother)

Lee Seng Tee FBA (Chinese: 李成智; pinyin: Lǐ Chéngzhì; 16 April 1923 – 29 July 2022) was a Singaporean businessman and philanthropist.

== Early life and education ==
Born in Singapore in 1923, Lee was the second son of Lee Kong Chian and a maternal grandson of Tan Kah Kee. Lee graduated from The Wharton School with a bachelor's degree in economics in 1950.

== Philanthropy ==
Lee was a director of the family's Lee Group of Companies, a Singapore-based conglomerate of firms in industries that include pineapple and investments; Lee was among the 40 richest people in Singapore primarily due to his stake in family businesses.

As a director of the Lee Foundation, Lee supported education, particularly higher education, around the world through personal donations towards building libraries and reading rooms, as well as supporting the acquisition of published resources for some of the most famous libraries in the world, which include the Needham Research Institute at the University of Cambridge and the Bodleian Library at the University of Oxford.

Lee was named an honorary fellow of the Chartered Institute of Library and Information Professionals for his philanthropic support of libraries worldwide.

In China, Lee's support for the Chinese Chess Association included the Lee Seng Tee Library at the Chess Academy in Beijing, the ST Lee Beijing International Open, and the Lee Seng Tee Cup (李成智杯). Other projects include the Lee Seng Tee Public Library (李成智公众图书馆) in Nan'an City, Fujian, where his father was born.

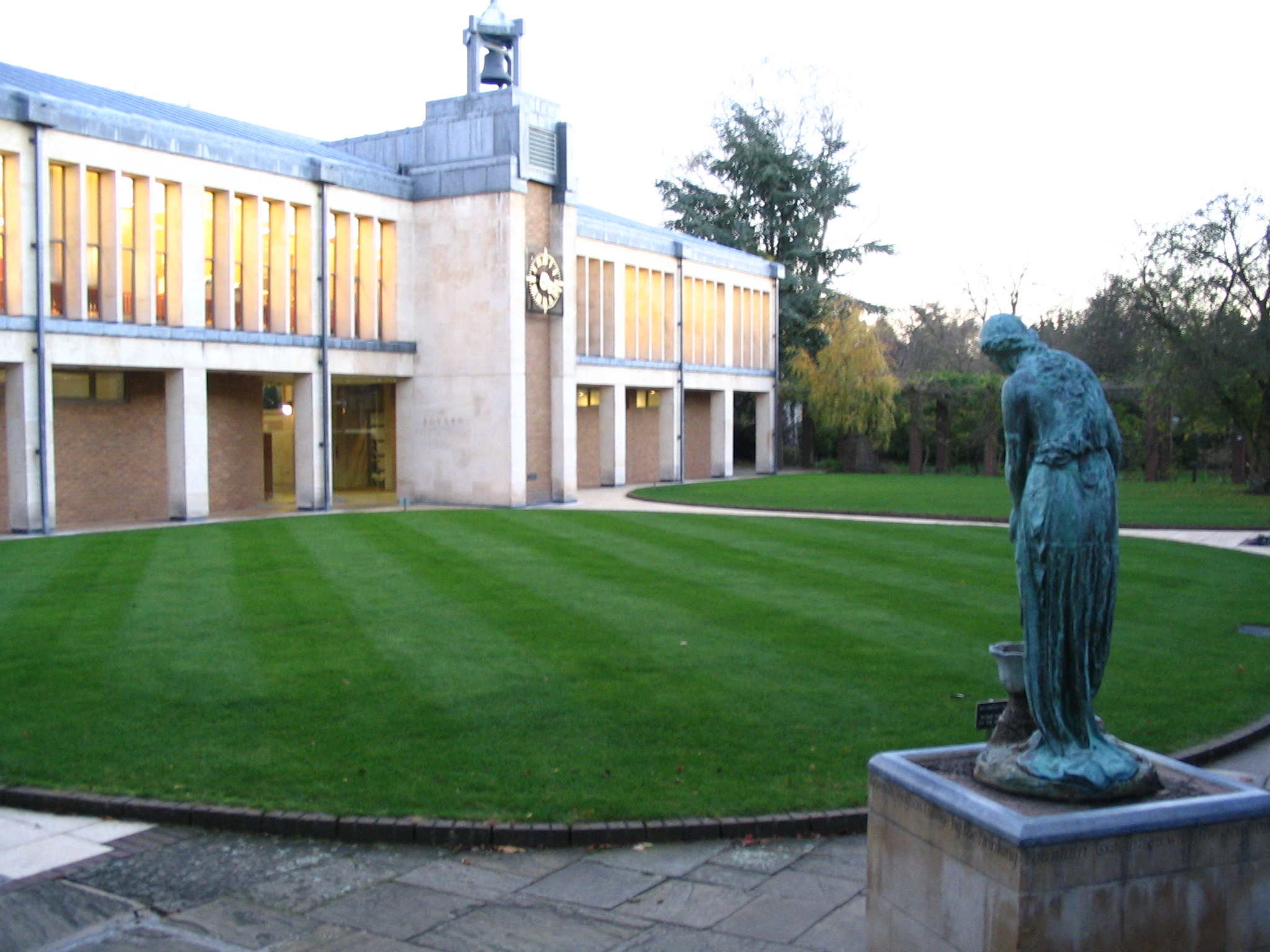
Lee Seng Tee Library, at Wolfson College, Cambridge

Lee also funded projects and lecture series at universities, including Cambridge and Oxford in the United Kingdom, Columbia University, Harvard University, University of Alaska Fairbanks, Stanford University and the Institute for Advanced Study, Princeton, in the United States, the University of Sydney in Australia, the Victoria University of Wellington in New Zealand, the University of the Witwatersrand in South Africa, and the National University of Singapore (NUS). The S.T. Lee Lectures provide a platform for scholars and policy-makers to address critical international issues.

== Death ==
Lee died on 29 July 2022, at the age of 99.

== Honours ==
Lee was an Honorary Fellow of the British Academy in 1998 and Foreign Honorary Member of the American Academy of Arts and Sciences in 2001, as well as an Honorary Fellow of Wolfson College, Cambridge, and Oriel College, Oxford. Lee was also a Member of the Guild of Cambridge Benefactors.

Lee has also received honorary degrees from the Asian Institute of Technology in 1998 in Thailand, Victoria University in 2006 and Washington University in St. Louis in 2008.

In October 2009, he was conferred the honorary degree of Doctor of Letters by Chancellor of the National University of Singapore S. R. Nathan.

Lee had a variety of bamboo, the Drepanostachyum falcatum var. sengteeanum, named after him.
