= Hong Kong people of Fujianese descent =

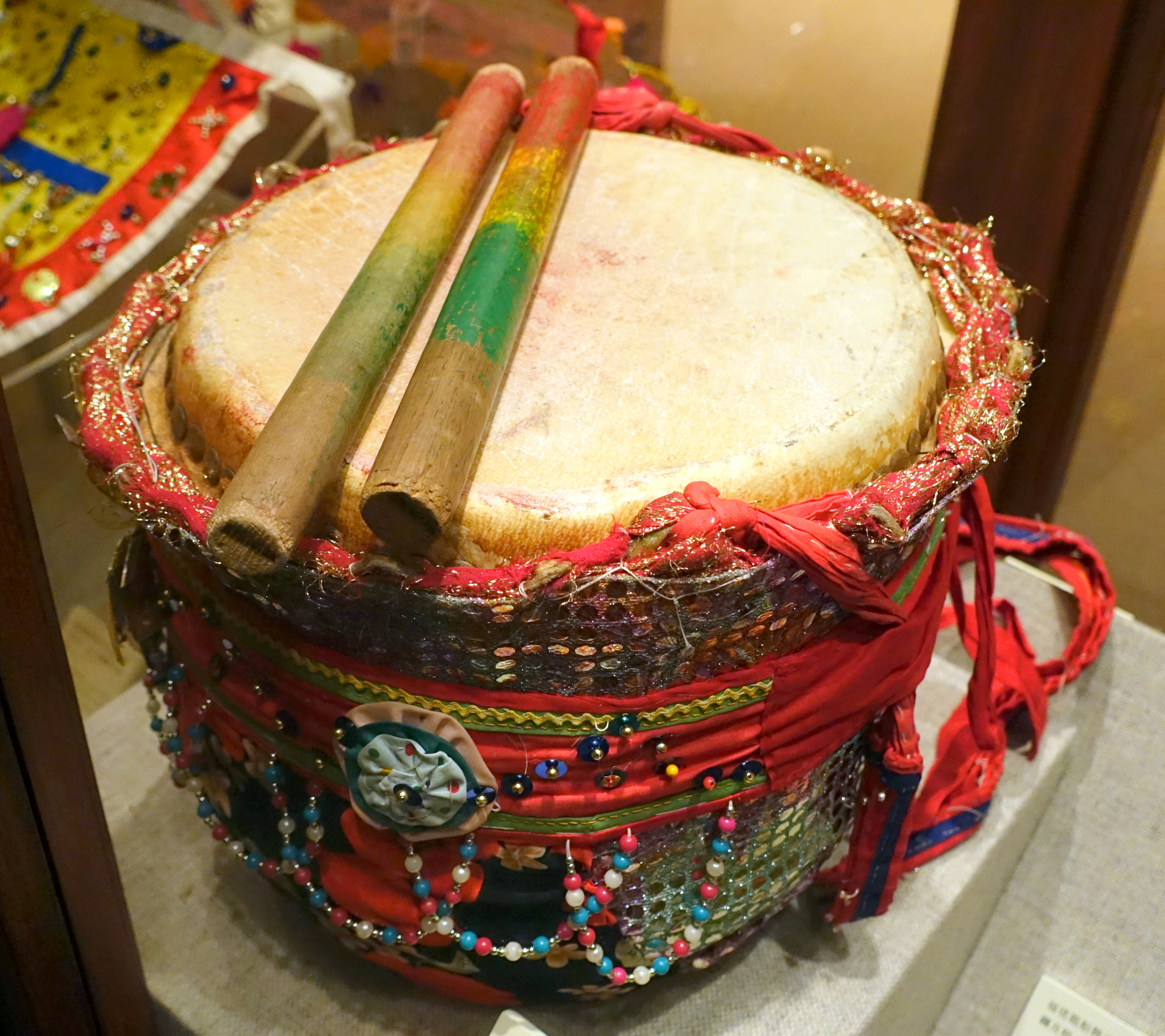
Drum and sticks used in Hoklo Dragon Boat Dance, preserved in Hong Kong Museum of History

Hong Kong people of Fujianese origin. Also known as Hoklo (although this term in many contexts also encompasses Chiu Chow people). North Point has a prominent Fujianese community. During the Hong Kong protests there were rumors of armed gangs from the mainland coming to settle disputes with protesters.

The Hoklo people are among the Indigenous inhabitants of the New Territories.

It is thought that 800,000 people have their origin in Fujian.

== People ==
- Ruco Chan
- Yoyo Chen
- Choy So-yuk
- Theresa Fu
- Raymond Lam
- Ma Lik
- John Ng
- Ng Man-tat
- Raymond Or
- Simon Peh
- Andrew Tan
- Wong Ker-lee
- Philip Wong
- Wong Po-yan

== See also ==
- Fujianese organized crime
- Fukien Secondary School
- Amoy College
- Chiyu Banking Corporation

== Bibliography ==
- Gregory Elliott Guldin, "Overseas" at Home: The Fujianese of Hong Kong, Volume 1, University of Wisconsin, 1977
