= Lee Seng Wee =

Singaporean banker and businessman

Lee Seng Wee DUBC
- 李成伟
- Born: 4 April 1930; Singapore, Straits Settlements
- Died: 7 August 2015 (aged 85); Singapore
- Education: University of Toronto (BEng); University of Western Ontario (MBA)
- Occupation: Businessman
- Children: 3
- Parent(s): Lee Kong Chian (father); Tan Ai Leh (mother)
- Relatives: Tan Kah Kee (maternal grandfather); Lee Seng Gee (brother); Lee Seng Tee (brother)

Lee Seng Wee DUBC (Chinese: 李成伟; pinyin: Lǐ Chéngwěi; 4 April 1930 – 7 August 2015) was a Singaporean banker and businessman.

== Early life ==
Lee was the third son of Lee Kong Chian, and maternal grandson of Tan Kah Kee.

Lee was educated at the Anglo-Chinese School in Singapore before graduating from the University of Toronto, where he studied engineering. He subsequently completed a Master of Business Administration degree at the University of Western Ontario, where he topped his class.

== Career ==
Upon returning to Singapore, Lee joined the Lee Rubber Company and rose to the position of vice-chairman. He subsequently became a director of the second-largest bank in Southeast Asia, OCBC Bank, where he served from 1966 to 2016, and later chairman from 1995 to 2003. He orchestrated a S$2.4 billion takeover bid for Singapore's then-fifth largest bank, Keppel Capital Holdings in June 2001.

In 2003, Lee stepped down as chairman and moved to a non-executive position, but continued to guide the strategic direction of the bank. Major investments and acquisitions during his long tenure include OCBC-NISP in Indonesia, OCBC China Bank, OCBC-Wing Hang in Hong Kong; the private banking business of ING Asia Bank, majority control of Great Eastern Life Insurance and a 20 percent stake in Bank of Ningbo in China. The net profit after tax for OCBC Group was almost S$4 billion for 2015.

In addition to his role in OCBC, Lee was also a director of several companies, including Lee Rubber Group Companies and Lee Foundation. He served as a board member of the GIC, Singapore's sovereign wealth fund and the Council of Presidential Advisors, Singapore.

Lee was conferred the Distinguished Service Order in 2001. In 2006, he received the Woodrow Wilson Award for Corporate Citizenship in New York for contributions to Singapore.

== Death ==
On 7 August 2015, at the age of 85, Lee died of complications arising from a head injury sustained during a fall at home.
