= Lee Foundation =

Charity in Singapore

Lee Foundation is Singapore's largest private charitable foundation. It was founded in 1952 by philanthropist and businessman Lee Kong Chian, and has since supported various educational causes, healthcare and medical endowments as well as disaster relief efforts. It is run by a board composed of Lee's descendants and non-family members. The foundation is also shareholder of OCBC Bank.

== Overview ==
The Lee Foundation was established in March 1952 with a funding of $3.5 million from business magnate Lee Kong Chian. Lee had been donating to schools like Kuo Chuan Girls' School, Nan Chiau Girls' High School, Chinese High School, Methodist Girls' School, St Margaret's School, Singapore Chinese Girls' School, Anglo Chinese School (ACS), the University of Malaya and Nanyang University. He had also donated to community institutions such as the Hokkien Huay Kuan Building, the Chinese Swimming Club and the National Library. Several institutions took on the name of Lee Kong Chian's father, Lee Kuo Chuan, as Lee had initially requested them not to use his name. Examples of institutions and buildings named after the elder Lee includes the Kuo Chuan Presbyterian School, Lee Kuo Chuan auditoriums in ACS (Barker Road) and Maris Stella High School, indoor stadium of Anglican High School, Lee Kuo Chuan Nursery Home and the Lee Kuo Chuan Creche. Lee Foundation was also registered in Malaysia in 1960. It was reported that Lee Kong Chian transferred half his shares in Lee Rubber Group to the foundation in 1964, it is alleged that he had bequeathed half of his wealth as proceeds to the foundation in his will.

Lee Seng Gee, eldest son of Lee Kong Chian and chairman of the Lee Rubber Group, was the chairman of the foundation from 1957 till his death in 2016. Board members include members of the Lee family such as businessman Lee Seng Tee (second son of Lee Kong Chian), YS Lee, Lee Han Shih (investor and former journalist for the Business Times), Lee ST, (director of OCBC), Lee Chien Shih and Alan Lee Shih Hua. Former board members include the former chairman of OCBC Lee Seng Wee. The foundation and the family has been known to keep a very low media profile.

Since its creation up till 2015, the foundation donated approximately S$1 billion to various causes, regardless of race, language, religion, nationality, and geographical location. Seventy-five percent of that amount went to education. Notable contributions included the following

- $60 million donation to the National Library for the Lee Kong Chian Reference Library, 2003
- $50 million donation to the Singapore Management University for Lee Kong Chian School of Business, in 2004
- $30 million gift to the National University of Singapore in 2005 for the Lee Kong Chian Wing.
- $25 million for Lee Kong Chian Natural History Museum of National University of Singapore
- $150 million to NTU-Imperial College London's medical school, named Lee Kong Chian School of Medicine, shortened to LKCMedicine.
- From 2014 to 2017, the Lee Foundation donated $3 million to Sian Chay for launching the "Pioneer Generation Medical Fund".

The Lee Kong Chian NUS-Stanford Initiative on Southeast Asia, founded in 2007, establishes a Distinguished Visiting Fellowship on Southeast Asia to help advance scholarly and policy-relevant consideration of this region.

In 2015, the sister foundation in Malaysia also donated a total of RM50 million to Universiti Tunku Abdul Rahman (UTAR) for the construction of its new campus building in Sungai Long, Kuala Lumpur. In honor of the foundation's founder, the university has named its engineering and science faculty as the Lee Kong Chian Faculty of Engineering and Science.

The generosity of the foundation has earned them many accolades such as the Distinguished Patron of the Arts Award by the National Arts Council for several years, and the National Volunteerism and Philanthropy Award Special Recognition Award in 2004 for Pioneers of philanthropy work in Singapore. Chairman Lee Seng Gee was awarded the Distinguished Service Order by the President of Singapore. In line with its original mission, the Lee Foundation continues to drive and promote education in socially relevant disciplines, e.g. in health and medical-related fields, and especially for disadvantaged students in Singapore, Malaysia and worldwide.
