= Xiamen Special Economic Zone =

Xiamen Special Economic Zone (Chinese: 厦门经济特区; pinyin: Xiàmén Jīngjì Tèqū; Pe̍h-ōe-jī: Ē-mn̂g Keng-chè Te̍k-khu), established in October 1980, is one of the five special economic zones in the People's Republic of China. Originally comprising a territory of 2.5 km^{2} in Xiamen City, it was expanded to 131 km^{2} in 1984, covering the entire Xiamen Island, which comprises Huli District and Siming District excluding Gulangyu.

Haicang and Xinglin districts were designated "Taiwan Businessmen Investment Zones" on 20 May 1989, and Jimei District was designated in 1992. Foreign investment enjoys the same economic policies as in the special economic zone.

== Geography ==
Xiamen is in southeastern Fujian (Minnan), China, beside the Taiwan Strait. The Kinmen Islands administered by Taiwan lie roughly 10 km away. Xiamen is next to Hong Kong, Macau and Taiwan. Xiamen has a good harbor, with a depth of 12 meters or more. The harbor is wide and rarely foggy or frozen and less silted, so cargo ships can enter and leave at essentially any time. Since the Ming and Qing dynasties, Xiamen has been one of the important ports for foreign transportation and trade in China. The Xiamen Special Economic Zone, which originally covered a boundary of 2.5 km^{2} in Xiamen City, was expanded to 131 km^{2} in 1984, encompassing the whole Xiamen Island, including Huli District and Siming District.

== Demographics ==
Becoming a special economic zone has greatly influenced Xiamen's demographics and economy. Xiamen Special Economic Zone has a resident population of about 5.1 million, according to the 2020 census. However, it has a large floating population of temporary residents estimated to be around 2.7 million. The share of the mobile population employed in the five major industries such as manufacturing, wholesale and retail, accommodation and catering, construction and social services is about 90%. The city has experienced rapid population growth since it was designated as a SEZ in 1980.

== Economic History of Xiamen (Pre-1945) ==
During the Song and Yuan Dynasties, Xiamen was a hub of contraband trade and pirate activity. It was fortified, in 1387 to try and ward off pirates which is also when the name "Xiamen" was first used. During the Qing dynasty, after the opium wars, trade with Europeans opened as Xiamen was designated as a treaty port and it continued its dynastic characteristic of being a maritime trade hub. British trade expanded from 380,000 silver dollars in 1843 to over 2 million in 1852.

It was also a migration hub of the time as more than 100,000 Chinese annually returned or left China through this treaty port from 1866. Throughout the Republican Era, the Second Sino-Japanese War, and the resumption of the Chinese Civil War in 1945 later put an end to Xiamen's economic prosperity.

== Economics of Xiamen (Post-1980) ==
In October 1980, the State Council of the People's Republic China approved the establishment of the Xiamen Special Economic Zone, designating 2.5 square kilometers of land in the Huli area in the northwest of Xiamen Island. Xiamen was one of five Special Economic Zones designated in 1980.

Continuing from its dynastic period, Xiamen became an important maritime cargo and container port to allow shipping from major world ports into China. The Xiamen Special Economic Zone has expanded to cover the entire Xiamen Island, including Gulangyu Island, with a total area of 131 square kilometers in 1985. In 1988, the State Council approved the establishment of Xiamen as a planned city (计划单列市), giving it economic management authority equivalent to that of a province. In 1989 and 1992, the State Council approved the establishment of three Taiwan investment zones, namely Haicang, Xinglin and Jimei, with investments in the zones being handled in accordance with the current special economic zone policies.

Fujian is responsible for 32.1% of all Taiwanese funds in the mainland. Xiamen's gross national product increased by 4.9 times over the 10 years since it opened in 1980 to 5.016 billion RMB. Other statistical increases include a 6.3 times increase in industrial and agricultural output value and per capita income increased from 631 RMB to 3720 RMB over the same 10 year span.

In November 1992, the State Council approved the establishment of Xiangyu Free Trade Zone in Xiamen. In February 1994, the Central Government determined Xiamen as a sub-provincial city.

In March 1994, the Second Session of the Eighth National People's Congress granted Xiamen the power to make laws and regulations within the scope of the Special Economic Zone. In June 2010, the State Council approved the expansion of the Xiamen Special Economic Zone (SEZ) to the whole city of Xiamen, and the inclusion of four suburban districts outside the island, namely Jimei, Haicang, Tongan and Xiangan, into the SEZ, making the Xiamen SEZ 12 times larger.

Xiamen has entered a new stage of integrated development within and outside the island. On March 8, 2011, the State Council officially approved the "Economic Zone Development Plan for the West Coast of the Taiwan Strait". This Plan clearly states that Xiamen should be supported to establish a regional financial service center across the Taiwan Strait, expand pilot financial reforms, and take the lead in experimenting with Taiwan's offshore finance and fund clearing.

Xiamen continues to enjoy benefits from being an early SEZ with it being known as a center for regional and international trade. Xiamen's GDP growth rate as of 2019 was 7.9% which outpaces almost all other Chinese cities. Xiamen's GDP also passed Taiwans in 2020.

== Economic Statistics ==
A decade following its establishment as a Special Economic Zone, Xiamen has witnessed remarkable economic growth. According to the Fujian Provincial Bureau of Statistics, the total gross domestic product (GDP) of Xiamen has increased by approximately sixteenfold, while GDP per capita has quadrupled in comparison to the late 1990s. Furthermore, the registered population in Xiamen has doubled over the same period.

Statistics of GDP & Population of Xiamen
Year	GDP (CNY 100mn)	GDP per capita (CNY)	Population (10000 persons)
1998	418.1	31727.0	126.6
1999	458.3	34735.0	129.0
2000	501.9	38021.0	131.3
2001	558.3	41110.9	134.4
2002	648.4	47270.1	137.2
2003	759.7	35008.9	141.8
2004	883.2	40147.0	146.8
2005	1006.6	44737.0	153.2
2006	1168.0	50130.0	160.4
2007	1387.9	56188.0	167.2
2008	1560.0	62651.0	173.7
2009	1737.2	68938.0	177.0
2010	2060.1	61022.0	180.2
2011	2539.3	72098.0	185.3
2012	2815.2	78820.0	190.9
2013	3018.2	81572.0	196.8
2014	3273.6	86832.0	203.4
2015	3466.0	90379.0	211.2
2016	3784.3	97282.0	219.5
2017	4351.7	109753.0	230.0
2018	4791.4	118015.0	241.2
2019	5995.0	142739.0	259.2
2020	6384.0	123962.0	272.1
2021	7033.9	134491.0	281.7

Regarding the inflows of actual foreign capital utilization reported by the Xiamen Bureau of Statistics, Siming district had relatively lower figures in the early 21st century than the other two districts. However, the district experienced the most significant increase and became the most actually-utilized foreign capital after 2010.

Foreign Capital Utilization by District
Year	Siming District	Jimei District	Haicang District (USD 10 th)
2003	4984	9427	14936
2004	9368	7645	15047
2005	13529	10302	17654
2006	17659	14105	21552
2007	18275	37120	36564
2008	25912	34338	52257
2009	32627	18423	33234
2010	35940	23270	32738
2011	36061	28954	32815
2012	34122	25672	5829
2013	32500	30552	15724
2014	65113	9339	25280
2015	49452	4882	25031
2016	51075	5184	27062

== Economic policies of the Xiamen SEZ ==
Special Economic Zones of China are intended to serve as special zones for accelerated economic development by employment of a subset of preferential policies, tax reductions and incentives, and infrastructure foundations. This shift in ideology promoted the transition to more of a market system promoting foreign direct investment and transition to rapid modernization. The preferential policies are set to execute the country wide 5 year development plan. With the release of the cities most recent 5 year plan, the 14th one, the city has committed to invest more in national innovation platforms and research centers. The SEZ will add half a percent more of the cities GDP to R&D spending. Xiamen will also continue to invest in the core of their industries, including "trade and logistics, financial services, software, information and technology services, and creative cultural tourism". With each Special economic zones and its own set of preferential policies, Xiamen's most recent incentive plan April 13, 2018 encapsulates:

Opening Wider to Foreign Investments

- Incentive encouragement to actual paid-in foreign capital amounting to two percent of total for up to 20 million RMB per enterprise.
- Foreign direct investment over 10 million RMB will receive a reward for contributing VAT of 100 percent for the first two years and 50 percent for the three years following.
- Value-add foreign M&A will also receive a reward of two percent over 10 million and capping at 20 million RMB.

Attract and retain Foreign Talents

- For foreign-funded enterprises with investments over 10 million RMB, their employees will receive a tax refund of 50 to 100 percent, depending on their paid income tax bracket.

Optimizing Business Environment

- "Leasing before purchasing" land rights.
- Setting up competent authority such as Xiamen Commission of Administrative Center, Bureau of Market Supervision & Administration, Bureau of Commerce, DRC, Bureau of Legislative Affairs, district governments, FTZ Committee, Administration of Torch Hi-Tech Park to better provide foreign institutions in navigating China's business landscape.

== Leading Industries (2023) ==
=== Xiamen Airlines ===
Xiamen Airlines was founded in 1984 as a joint private public venture. It had the goal of modernizing China's aviation industry during the opening up and reform period. Currently, it has a market capitalization of 5.072 billion RMB and is rated the 4th best airline in China as of 2022 by Skytrax. It has more than 145 airplanes serving 320 domestic and international routes and is now a Star Alliance member.

=== Electronics and machinery manufacturing ===
496.7 billion RMB was the total output from these industries which is 70% of the industrial output of Xiamen. It has a growth rate of 9.9% per year which is relatively high. Some large companies operating in this space in Xiamen are Toshiba, Fujitsu, and LG.

=== Maritime ===
Maritime trade accounts for 22% of the local GDP, which is mainly processed through the Port of Xiamen. This port is the 8th largest in China and is a crucial port for the region, including Taiwan and other key trade partners around the globe. The local government is also looking to increase the recreational maritime economy with cruises, fishing, and sailing, which will in turn increase tourism.

== See also ==
- Shantou Special Economic Zone
- Shenzhen Special Economic Zone
- Zhuhai Special Economic Zone
