= Lee Kong Chian School of Business =

Coordinates: 1°17′43″N 103°51′02″E

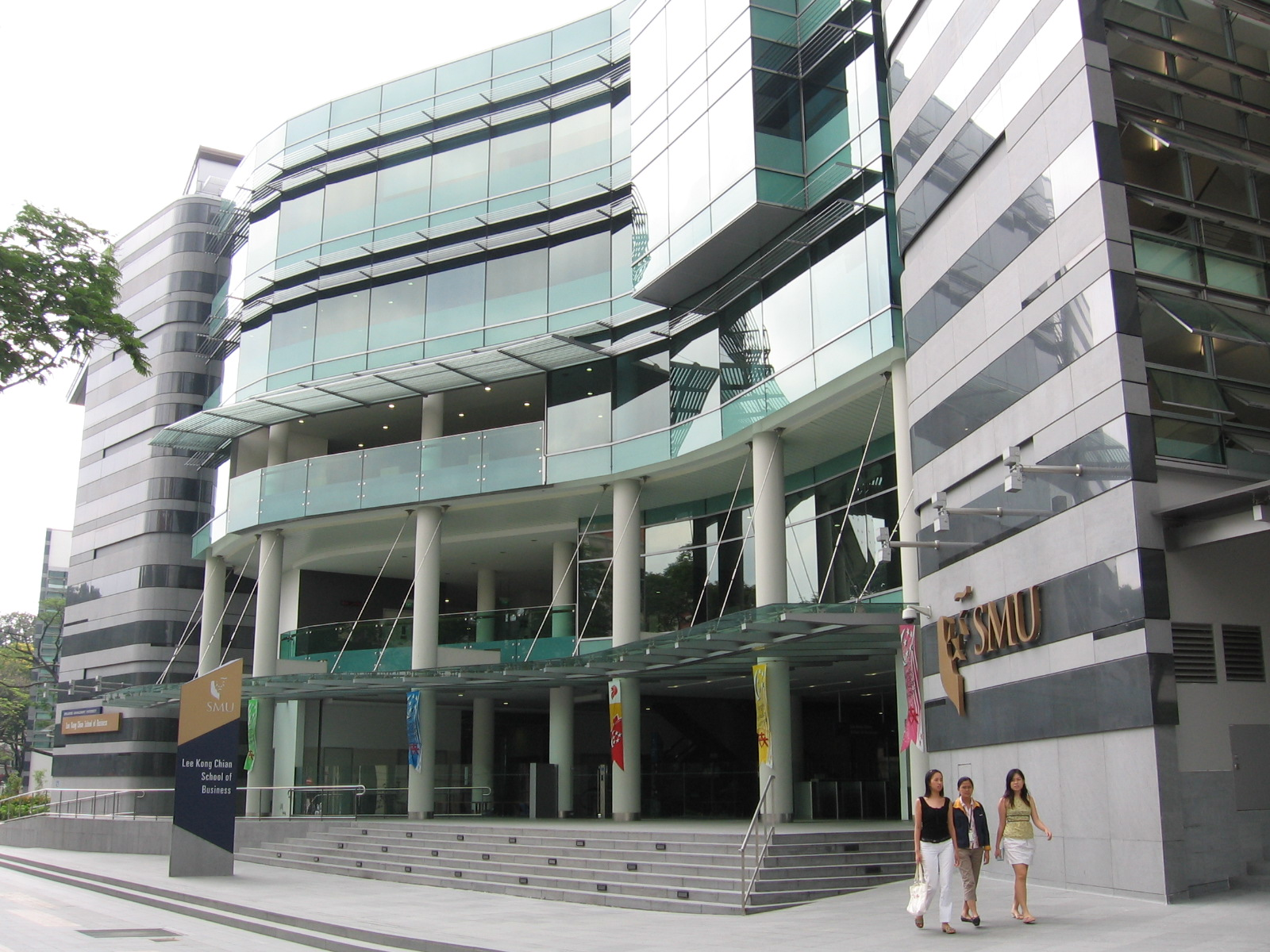
Lee Kong Chian School of Business

The Lee Kong Chian School of Business is the business school of the Singapore Management University (SMU). Established in 2000, the school was the first to be established under the Singapore Management University's charter. It is a research-driven school, with a blend of education that focuses on academic research and industrial relevance. Faculty are hired on the basis of research or on perceived expertise in their field of study or practice. The current dean is Professor Bert De Reyck.

The school was named after Lee Kong Chian after receiving a donation of S$50 million from The Lee Foundation, a trust established by Lee and administered by Lee's children. This amount was matched by the Government of Singapore in a 3-to-1 ratio, thus resulting in a S$200 million funding.

== Programs ==
The Lee Kong Chian School of Business is the flagship school of SMU, accredited by AACSB International, EQUIS, and AMBA, with a large portion of the university's students enrolled in the school's undergraduate and postgraduate programs. The program is modelled after the Wharton School's curriculum to provide a broad-based approach to university education. At the undergraduate level, the school offers the Bachelor of Business Management (B.B.M.), a four-year program with academic majors in the areas of finance, law, management, marketing, quantitative finance and operations management. Undergraduates who major in law are not admitted to the Bar, as the program is not a specialized law degree. All undergraduates are eligible for a second major, which can be from other schools at SMU. This includes areas such as accountancy, economics, information systems management and fields within the social sciences.

In December 2011, Lee Kong Chian School of Business was conferred the European Quality Improvement System (EQUIS) accreditation by the European Foundation for Management Development (EFMD), the accreditation covers all programmes offered by the LKCSB from the undergraduate degree up to the PhD level. The accreditation is for a period of five years

In addition to several graduate level degree programs by coursework, the school also offers 10 Master's programmes which are targeted towards executives. These programs include MBAs, Master of Science in management, finance masters and specialised masters.

The school also offers DBA, and PhD in business programmes in finance, marketing, operations management, OBHR, strategic management & organisation, and general management.

== Clubs and sub-clubs ==
=== Bondue ===
Bondue is the LKCSB's Business Society club. The club organizes activities such as awareness programs for academic majors, as well as other activities to foster greater unity between members of the school.

=== Cognitare ===
Cognitare LKC SB's Business Case club. Members are selected by faculty to represent the university in business case competitions. The club has achieved notable success, including victories at the Copenhagen Business Case Competition in 2002, the Danone TRUST competition in 2005 and the CIBER Challenge in 2005.

=== EYE Investment Club ===
EYE Investment Club is Singapore Management University (SMU)’s first and largest investment interactive club. It was set up in March 2002 by a group of students who possess similar interest in investments and financial planning.

The club was set up to facilitate the exchange of ideas and knowledge in this field between students, faculty and alumni of SMU.
