= Lee Kong Chian =

Singaporean businessman and philanthropist (1893–1967)

Yang Berbahagia Tan Sri Dato' Lee Kong Chian PMN SPMJ SJMK
- 李光前
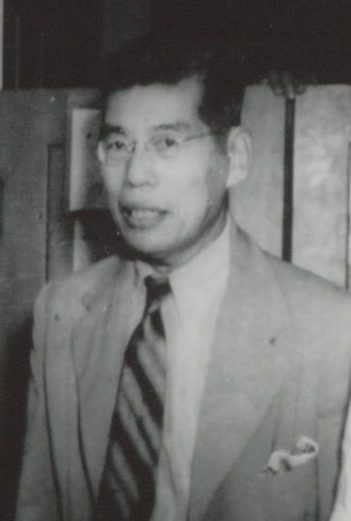
- Lee c. 1946
- Born: 18 October 1893; Furong Village, Nan'an County, Fujian Province, Qing Empire
- Died: 2 June 1967 (aged 73); Singapore
- Resting place: Kong Meng San Phor Kark See Monastery
- Other name: Lee Geok Kun
- Known for: Philanthropic work
- Spouse: Tan Ai Leh
- Children: 6 (including Lee Seng Tee and Lee Seng Wee)
- Parent: Lee Kuo Chuan (father)
- Relatives: Tan Kah Kee (father-in-law)

Lee Kong Chian
- Chinese: 李光前
- Hokkien POJ: Lí Kong-chiân
Transcriptions
Standard Mandarin
- Hanyu Pinyin: Lǐ Guāngqián
Yue: Cantonese
- Jyutping: Lei^{5} Gwong^{1}-cin^{4}
Southern Min
- Hokkien POJ: Lí Kong-chiân
- Tâi-lô: Lí Kong-tsiân

Lee Geok Kun
- Chinese: 李玉昆
- Hokkien POJ: Lí Gio̍k-kun
Transcriptions
Standard Mandarin
- Hanyu Pinyin: Lǐ Yùkūn
Yue: Cantonese
- Jyutping: Lei^{5} Juk^{6}-gwan^{1}
Southern Min
- Hokkien POJ: Lí Gio̍k-kun

Tan Sri Dato' Lee Kong Chian PMN SPMJ SJMK (Chinese: 李光前; Pe̍h-ōe-jī: Lí Kong-chiân; 18 October 1893 – 2 June 1967), also known by his alias Lee Geok Kun (Chinese: 李玉昆; Pe̍h-ōe-jī: Lí Gio̍k-kun), was a prominent Chinese Singaporean businessman and philanthropist based in Malaya and Singapore between the 1930s and the 1960s. He was the founder of the Lee Foundation and one of the richest men in Southeast Asia in the 1950s and 1960s. He was also a son-in-law of Tan Kah Kee, another well-known Chinese businessman and philanthropist based in Southeast Asia. He is affectionately known today as the "founding father" of Oversea-Chinese Banking Corporation.

== Early life and career ==
Lee was born in Furong Village in Nan'an, Fujian, His father was Lee Kok Chuan (simplified Chinese: 李国专; traditional Chinese: 李國專; Pe̍h-ōe-jī: Lí Kok-choan).

Lee received his early education in private schools in his hometown. In 1903, at the age of 10, he came to Singapore, then a British colony, to join his father. He studied at the defunct Anglo-Tamil School, and Chung Cheng High School.

Lee went to northern China in 1909 to complete his education under a scholarship by the British. In China, Lee studied at Chi Nan College in and later the Railway and Mining College, which was one of the top colleges in China at that time, and a forerunner of the present-day Southwest Jiaotong University and North China University of Science and Technology.

Upon returning to Singapore, Lee worked as a teacher at Tao Nan School and as a translator at a Chinese-language newspaper company. He also worked as an assistant field surveyor with the Public Works Department. In 1915, Lee joined the China Guohua Company owned by Tan Kah Kee, and became Tan's protégé. He was promoted to the manager of the Tan Kah Kee Rubber Company in 1917. Three years later, he married Tan's daughter, Tan Ai Leh (simplified Chinese: 陈爱礼; traditional Chinese: 陳愛禮; pinyin: Chén Àilǐ; Pe̍h-ōe-jī: Tân Ài-lé).

== Business career ==
Seven years later, Lee set up his own rubber smoking house in Muar, Johor, Malaya, which became the Nam Aik Rubber Company in 1928. His enterprises of rubber planting and manufacture, pineapple planting and canning soon expanded to other parts of Southeast Asia, including Singapore, Malaya, North Borneo, Indonesia and Thailand. He was known as "Southeast Asia's Rubber and Pineapple King". He became one of the richest men in the region, with the Lee Rubber Company becoming a multimillion-dollar business which he started in 1931. His brother George Lee joined him at the company. Besides establishing himself as a rubber tycoon, Lee diversified his business interests to include sawmills and the trading of pineapple, coconut oil, biscuits and raw material. He also set up Lee Pineapple, Lee Produce, Lee Sawmills, Lee Printing and Lee Biscuits.

Lee also went into banking. He was vice-chairman of Chinese Commercial Bank (CCB) and played a central role in facilitating the merger of the Oversea-Chinese Bank, the Ho Hong Bank and the CCB to form the Oversea-Chinese Banking Corporation (OCBC) in 1932, becoming the largest bank in Singapore. Lee served OCBC as vice-chairman from 1932, and assumed chairmanship of OCBC in 1938, holding this post until his death in 1967.

== Philanthropy ==
Like Tan Kah Kee, Lee poured his wealth into education and other philanthropic efforts. He set up the Lee Foundation in Singapore and Malaya in 1952 and 1960 respectively. In 1965, the Lee Foundation Limited was established in Hong Kong.

Lee also spearheaded free public library services for Singapore when he donated S$375,000 through the Lee Foundation to allow the Singapore Government to build the Old National Library building at Stamford Road. The old building was eventually demolished and replaced by a much larger new building, a project that also received substantial financial backing from the foundation. The new National Library building consisted of a lending library (Central Public Library) located at basement one and the National Library/Lee Kong Chian Reference Library (previously known as the National Reference library), occupies the 7th to 13th floors, was named in his honour.

=== Education ===
Lee had a particular interest in the field of education and various institutions have been beneficiaries of donations from him or the Lee Foundation, including Singapore Management University, National University of Singapore, Anglo-Chinese School, St. Margaret's Secondary School, Methodist Girls' School, Singapore Chinese Girls' School, Tao Nan School and Anglican High School. After his death, the foundation continued this legacy and expanded into funding scholarships and bursaries offered by both educational institutions and government agencies.

In 1934, Lee became the chairman of the Board of Directors of The Chinese High School (now Hwa Chong Institution), a post he held until 1957. In 1939, Lee founded Guozhuan Primary School in his hometown, Furong Village. In 1941, Lee donated his properties in River Valley, Singapore for the establishment of Nan Chiau Teachers' Training College (now Nan Chiau High School). He gave lectures in Columbia University during the Second World War while he was stranded in the United States. Lee became the vice-chancellor of the University of Singapore (now the National University of Singapore) and donated S$1 million for the development of a medical college on the college's grounds.

== Later life ==
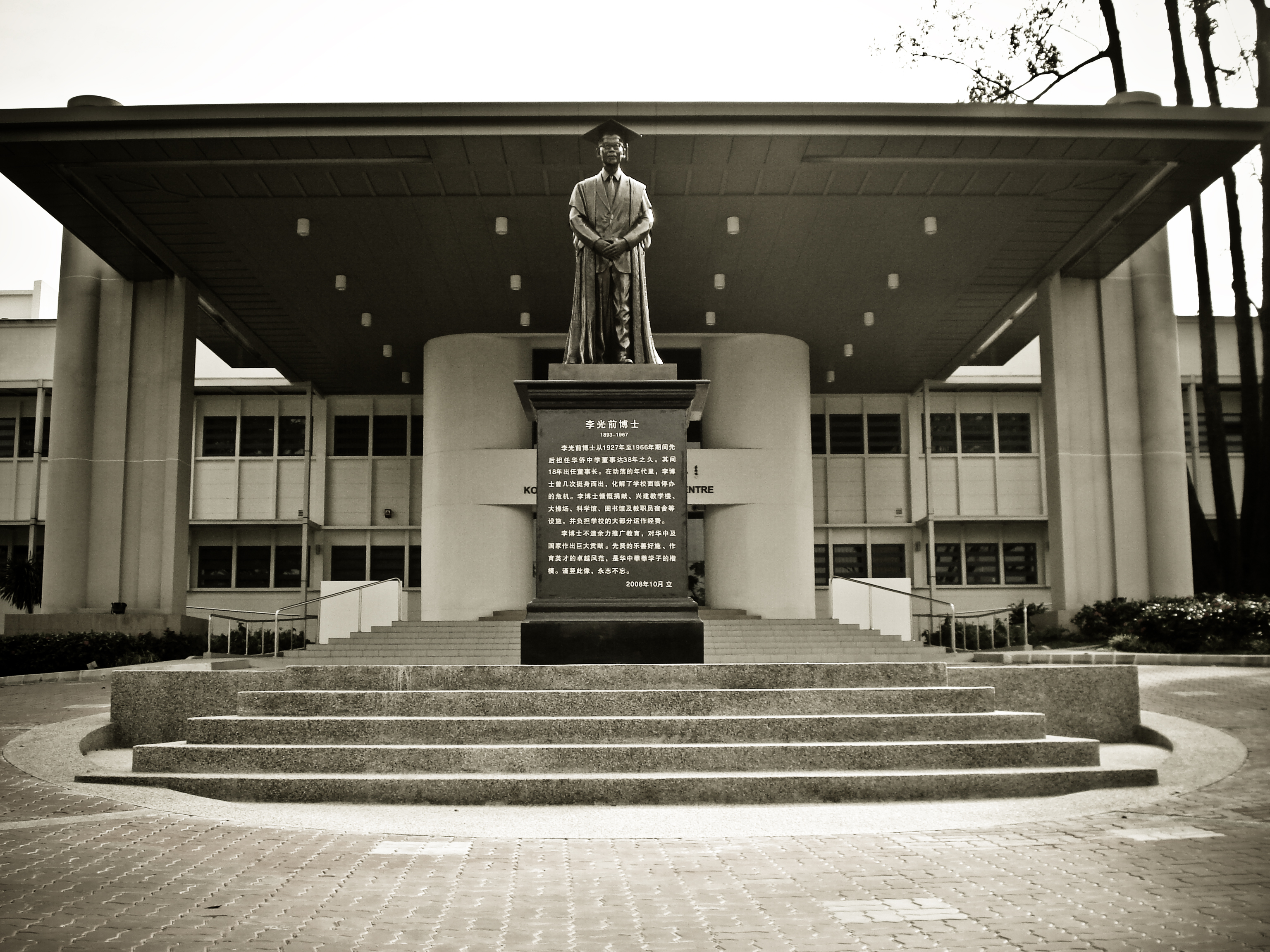
Statue of Lee Kong Chian in front of Kong Chian Administration Centre, Hwa Chong Institution.

Lee's work and generous contributions to education and society were recognised. He was conferred an honorary Doctor of Laws by the University of Malaya in 1958. In 1964, Malaysia's Yang di-Pertuan Agong (head of state), Putra of Perlis, awarded Lee the title Panglima Mangku Negara (PMN), hence Lee was known by the honorific Tan Sri. Prior to that, Lee had been made Dato' by the Sultans of Johor and Kelantan in 1957 and 1959 respectively. In 1965, Lee was conferred another honorary degree, Doctor of Letters, by the University of Singapore.

== Legacy ==
Lee died in 1967 and is survived by three sons and three daughters.

=== Places named after Lee Kong Chian ===
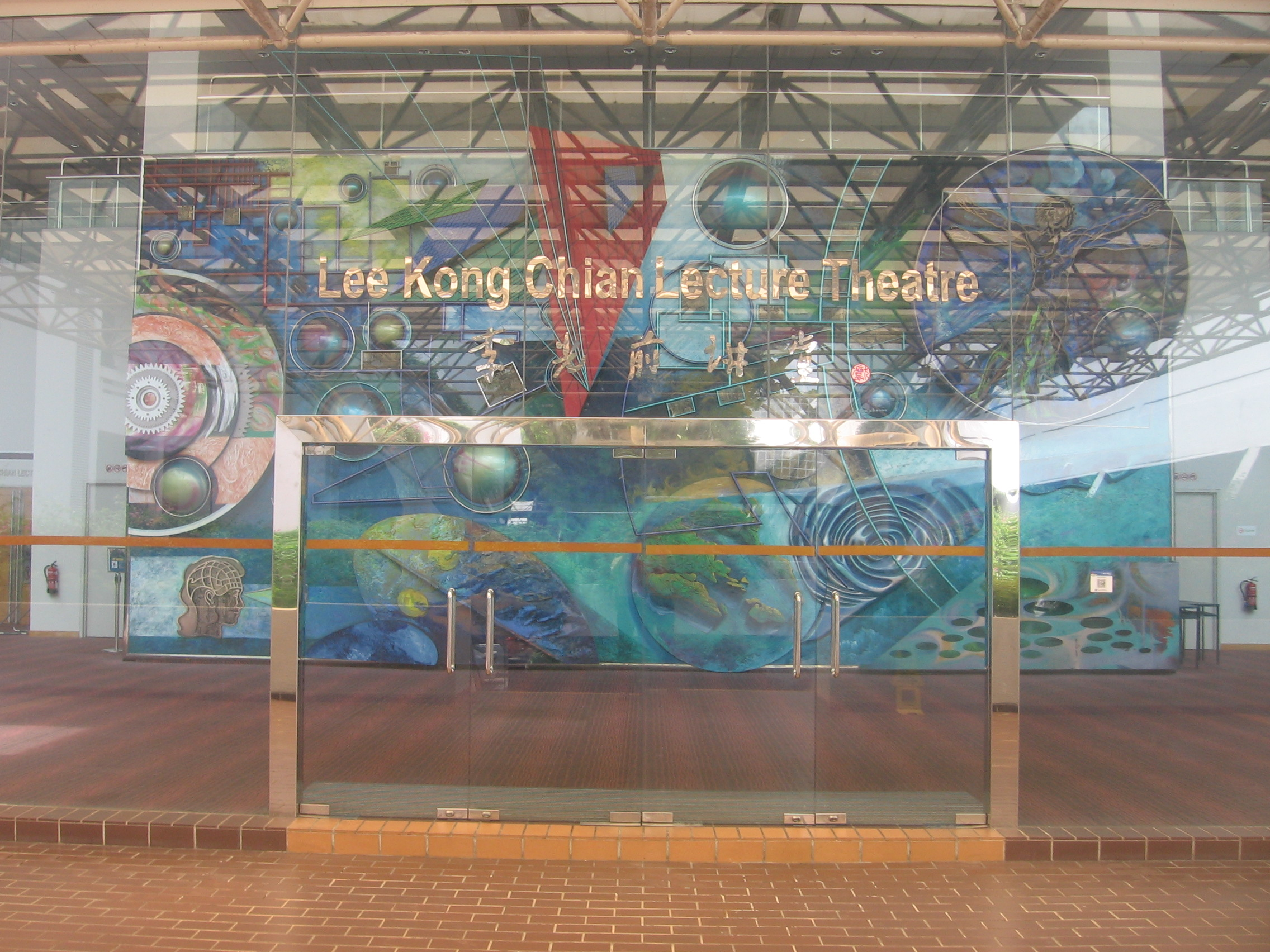
Lee Kong Chian Lecture Theatre, Nanyang Technological University

- Lee Kong Chian Reference Library, National Library, Singapore
- Lee Kong Chian Wing, University Hall, National University of Singapore
- Lee Kong Chian Natural History Museum, National University of Singapore
- Lee Kong Chian Centre for Mathematical Research, National University of Singapore
- Lee Kong Chian School of Medicine, Nanyang Technological University
- Lee Kong Chian Lecture Theatre, Nanyang Technological University
- Lee Kong Chian School of Business, Singapore Management University
- Lee Kong Chian Faculty of Engineering and Science (LKCFES), Universiti Tunku Abdul Rahman (UTAR)
- Tan Sri Lee Kong Chian Hall, Methodist College Kuala Lumpur
- Lee Kong Chian Gardens School, LGS-MINDS
- Lee Kong Chian Library, Anglican High School
- Lee Kong Chian Auditorium, Anglo-Chinese School (Barker Road)
- Kong Chian Administration Centre, Hwa Chong Institution
- Kong Chen Hall, Chong Hwa Independent High School, Kuala Lumpur
- Kong Chian Hall, SJK (C) Cheng Siu 1
- Kong Chian Hall, Kuala Lumpur and Selangor Chinese Assembly Hall
- Kong Chien Hall, Foon Yew High School, Johor Bahru
- Kong Chian Hall, Singapore [Chung Cheng High School (Main), Singapore]
- Kong Chian Hall, Nan Chiau High School
- Kong Chian Library, Hwa Chong Institution (High School Section)

=== Places named after Lee Kong Chian's father ===
There are also some places named after Lee's father, Lee Kuo Chuan, including:

- Kuo Chuan Avenue, a road in Singapore's Marine Parade district
- Kuo Chuan Presbyterian Secondary School
- Kuo Chuan Presbyterian Primary School
- Heritage Centre, Hwa Chong Institution (High School Section), previously known as Kuo Chuan Art Centre
- Lee Kuo Chuan Stadium, Anglican High School
- Lee Kuo Chuan Hall, Church of the Ascension Singapore
- SRJK (C) Kuo Kuang (国光国民型华文小学) No. 1 and SRJK (C) Kuo Kuang No. 2 - Two Chinese medium primary school in Skudai, Johor Bahru, Malaysia, named after the combination of middle names of Lee 'Kuo' Chuan and Lee 'Kong' (Kuang) Chian.

== Honours ==
=== Honours of Malaysia ===
- Malaysia :
  - Commander of the Order of the Defender of the Realm (PMN) – Tan Sri (1964)
- Kelantan :
  - Knight Grand Commander of the Order of the Life of the Crown of Kelantan (SJMK) – Dato' (1959)
- Johor :
  - Knight Grand Commander of the Order of the Crown of Johor (SPMJ) – Dato’ (1960)
  - Knight Commander of the Order of the Crown of Johor (DPMJ) – Dato’ (1957)
