= Tan Kah Kee =

Chinese businessman

- 陳嘉庚
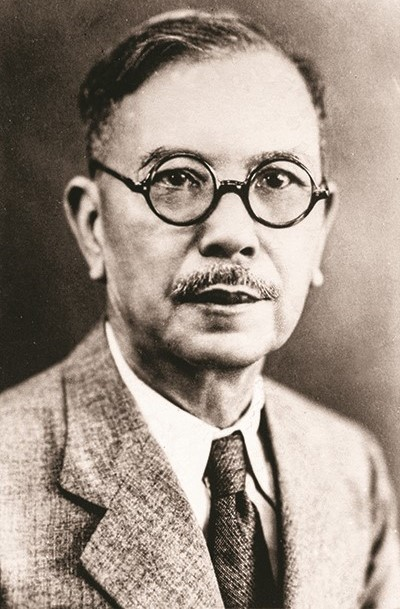
- Born: 21 October 1874; Jimei, Tong'an County, Fujian Province, Qing Empire
- Died: 12 August 1961 (aged 86); Beijing, People's Republic of China
- Resting place: Tomb of Tan Kah Kee, Jimei District, Xiamen, Fujian Province, People's Republic of China
- Other name: Chen Jiageng
- Occupations: Businessman; investor; philanthropist
- Known for: Philanthropic work, setting up schools in China and Southeast Asia and helping to raise funds to support China in major events during the 20th century
- Spouse: 4
- Children: 18
- Parent: Tan Kee Peck (father)
- Relatives: Tan Keng Hian (younger brother); Tan Lark Sye (distant relative); Lee Kong Chian (son-in-law)

Tan Kah Kee
- Traditional Chinese: 陳嘉庚
- Simplified Chinese: 陈嘉庚
- Hokkien POJ: Tân Ka-kiⁿ
Transcriptions
Standard Mandarin
- Hanyu Pinyin: Chén Jiāgēng
Yue: Cantonese
- Jyutping: Can^{4} Gaa^{1}-gang^{1}
Southern Min
- Hokkien POJ: Tân Ka-kiⁿ

Tan Kah Kee (Chinese: 陳嘉庚; Pe̍h-ōe-jī: Tân Ka-kiⁿ; also spelled as Chen Jiageng; 21 October 1874 – 12 August 1961) was a Chinese businessman, investor, entrepreneur and philanthropist active in Singapore, Hong Kong and the Chinese cities of Shanghai, Xiamen, and Guangzhou.

A prominent figure in the overseas Chinese community in Singapore and wider Southeast Asia during the 20th century, he was responsible for gathering much support from the community to aid China in major events such as the Xinhai Revolution (1911), the Kuomintang's Northern Expedition (1926–28), and the Second Sino-Japanese War (1937–45).

Apart from donating most of his assets and earnings to aid China in those major events, Tan set up funds in Southeast Asia and Hong Kong and contributed to the establishment of several schools in Southeast Asia and China's Fujian Province, including Xiamen University.

== Life ==
Tan Kah Kee was born in Jimei, Fujian Province, in 1874 during the Qing dynasty of China. In 1890, at the age of 16, he travelled to Singapore in the Straits Settlements to help his father, who owned a rice trading business. In 1903, after his father's business collapsed, Tan started his own company and built a business empire from rubber plantations, manufacturing, sawmills, canneries, real estate, import and export brokerage, ocean transport and rice trading. As he was proficient in Hokkien, he achieved much success doing business in Singapore because Hokkien was the common language of overseas Chinese in Singapore throughout most of the 19th and 20th centuries. His business was at its prime from 1912 to 1914 when he was known as the "Henry Ford of the Malayan community".

Tan had a leading role among the 110 founders of Tao Nan School in Singapore. In 1919, he set up The Chinese High School (now Hwa Chong Institution) in Singapore. Earlier, in 1918, he established the Jimei Schools (now Jimei University) in Xiamen. Tan was also a member of the Anglo-Chinese College Council and had pledged S$100,000 to the proposed Anglo Chinese School College in 1919. However, when the proposal was turned down by the Government, he agreed to channel the $30,000 he had given to the Anglo-Chinese School fund for physics and chemistry. This helped to complete the Secondary School at Cairnhill in 1928. In 1921, he set up Xiamen University and financially supported it until the Nationalist government of the Republic of China took over in 1937. In 1920, Tan arranged a marriage between his daughter, Tan Ai Leh, and Lee Kong Chian, his protégé and a businessman.

Tan was one of the prominent overseas Chinese to provide financial support to China during the Second Sino-Japanese War. He organised many relief funds under his name, one of which alone managed to raise ten million Straits dollars in 1937. He was also a participant in the Legislative Yuan of the Nationalist government in Chongqing. After the Japanese invaded and occupied Malaya and Singapore in 1942, they deemed these contributors "undesirable" and conducted systematic extermination of anti-Japanese elements in Singapore through the Sook Ching Massacre. Tan survived because he escaped from Singapore before it fell to the Japanese, and went into hiding in Malang, a town in East Java province, Indonesia. He strongly rejected proposals to attempt to negotiate with the Japanese and regarded such attempts as characteristic of a hanjian (a Chinese term for race traitor). He also attempted to dissuade Wang Jingwei from such activities. He exercised considerable effort against the governor of Fujian Province, Chen Yi, for perceived maladministration.

In 1942, when the Japanese invaded Singapore, Tan was one of the most wanted man by Japanese Imperial Army. His employees forced him to leave the country. He fled first to Medan, Sumatra where he had a business interest before finally settling in Malang, Java, present day Indonesia. Over the next three years, Tan began writing his memoirs, The Memoirs of an Overseas Chinese of the Southern Ocean (南僑回憶錄; 南侨回忆录; Nánqiáo Huíyìlù), which later became an important document of the history of the overseas Chinese in Southeast Asia.

Tan was the de facto leader of the Chinese community in Singapore, serving as chairman of the Chinese Chamber of Commerce and helping to organise the Hokkien clan association. However, he lost this role when the Chinese Civil War divided Singapore's Chinese community into Communist and Kuomintang sympathisers. Tan Kah Kee supported the Kuomintang during the early years of the war against Japan, but found the Communists in Yan'an to be much more disciplined during a fact-finding mission in 1940.

In 1947, Tan founded the Chiyu Banking Corporation in Hong Kong, an intended to be a sustainable business with profits to be devoted to education in Xiamen and the rest of Fujian province in China.

After the Communist victory in China and the founding of the People's Republic of China in 1949, Tan tried to return to Singapore in 1950 but was denied entry by the British colonial authorities concerned about communist influence in Singapore and Malaya. He then moved permanently to China and served in numerous positions in the Chinese Communist Party.

Tan died in 1961 in Beijing and was given a state funeral by the Chinese government. In Singapore, the Tan Kah Kee Scholarship Fund, which later became known as the Tan Kah Kee Foundation, was established in memory of this philanthropy.

== Personal life ==
Tan's sons were:

- Tan Chay Bing (陳濟民; Chén Jìmín), Tan Khuat Siong (陳厥祥; Chén Juéxiáng), Tan Pok Ai (陳博愛; Chén Bó'ài), Tan Pok Chay (陳博濟; Chén Bójì), Tan Kok Kheng (陳國慶; Chén Guóqìng), Tan Guan Khai (陳元凱; Chén Yuánkǎi), Tan Guan Chay (陳元濟; Chén Yuánjì), Tan Kok Whye (陳國懷; Chén Guóhuái) and Tan Guan Aik (陳元翼; Chén Yuányì)

Tan's daughters were:

- Tan Ai Leh (陳愛禮; Chén Àilǐ), Tan Lay Ho (陳麗好; Chén Lìhǎo), Tan Ah Hui (陳亞輝; Chén Yàhuī), Tan Siew Mui, Tan Mary (陳瑪麗; Chén Mǎlì), Tan Lay Choo (陳麗珠; Chén Lìzhū), Tan Poh Tee (陳保治; Chén Bǎozhì) and Tan Ai Eng (陳愛英; Chén Àiyīng)

Many of his children maintained close relationship with or even married other prominent Chinese figures in Singapore. For example, Tan Ai Leh, his eldest daughter, was married to Lee Kong Chian; Tan Lay Ho was married to Lim Chong Kuo, the eldest son of respected merchant Lim Nee Soon.

== Legacy ==
In recognition of Tan's contributions to education and society throughout his lifetime, there are places and establishments in China and Southeast Asia named after Tan or built to commemorate him, including: the Tan Kah Kee Memorial Museum in Tan's hometown in Jimei; the Tan Kah Kee Foundation, which offers postgraduate scholarships; the Tan Kah Kee MRT station along the Downtown MRT line in Singapore, next to the current site of Hwa Chong Institution. The schools in the Anglo-Chinese School family have houses named after Tan. Chongfu School's Main Hall is named after him. Tan Kah Kee Hall in the College of Chemistry at the University of California, Berkeley is also named after him.

The asteroid 2963 Chen Jiageng is named after him.

== Image gallery ==
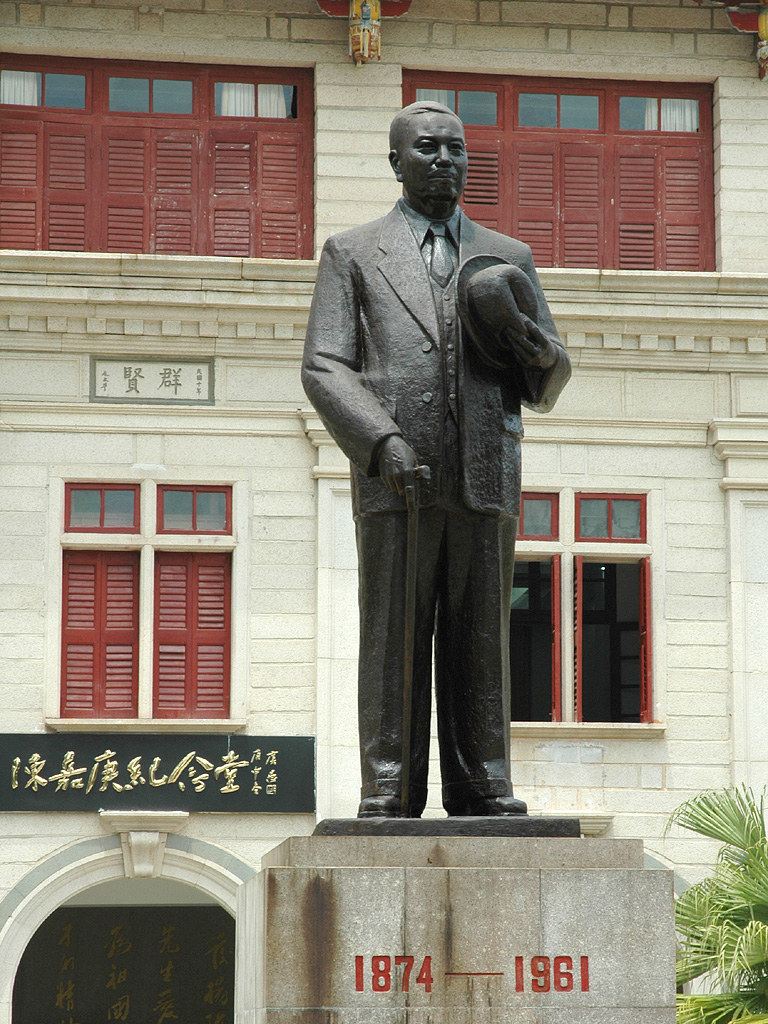
Statue of Tan Kah Kee in front of a memorial hall in Xiamen University, Xiamen, Fujian, China.

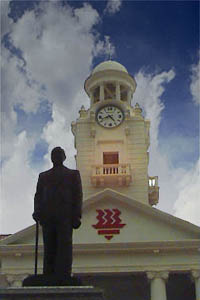
Statue of Tan Kah Kee in front of the clock tower of Hwa Chong Institution, Singapore.

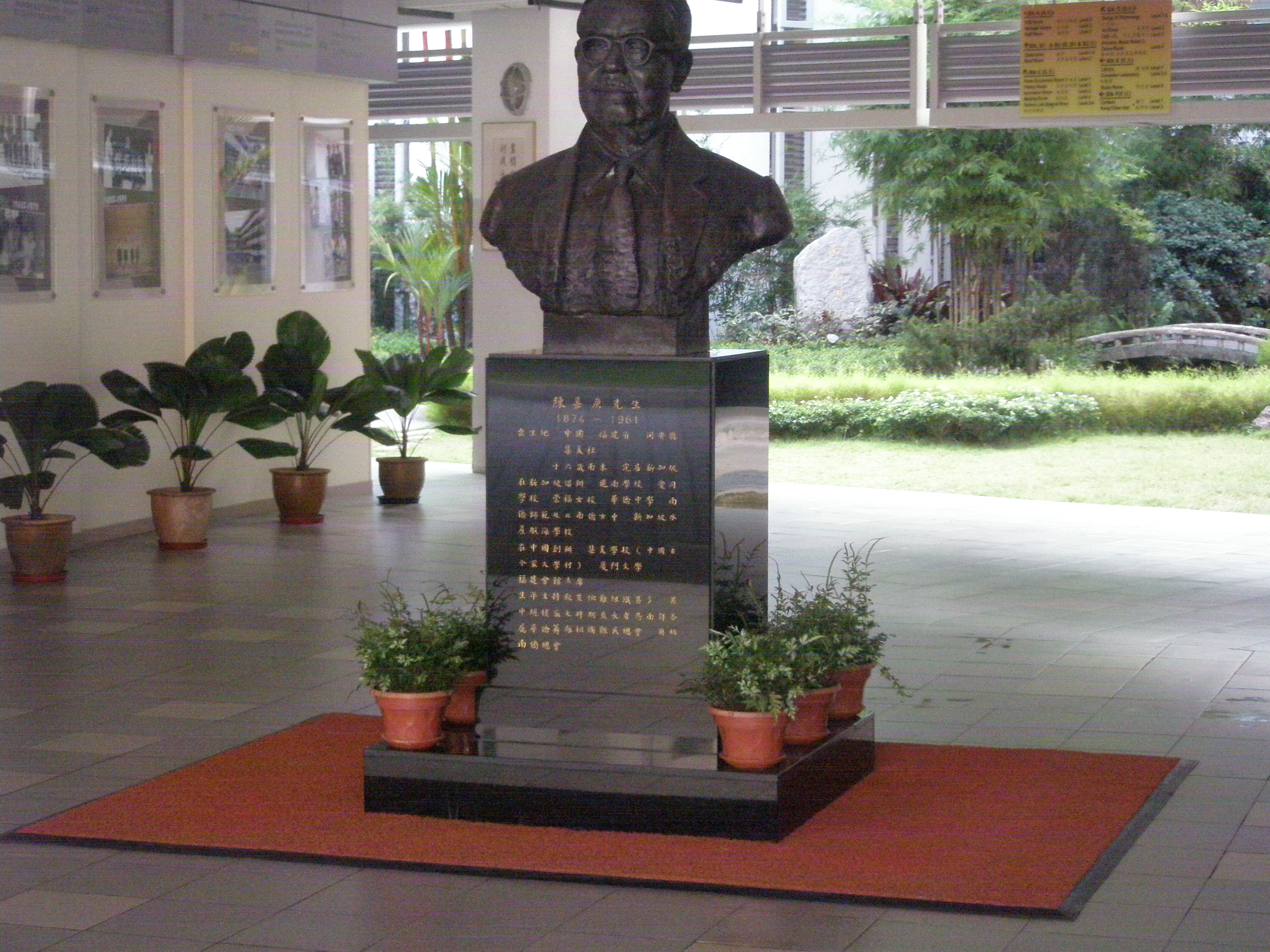
Head statue of Tan Kah Kee at the foyer of Nan Chiau High School, Singapore

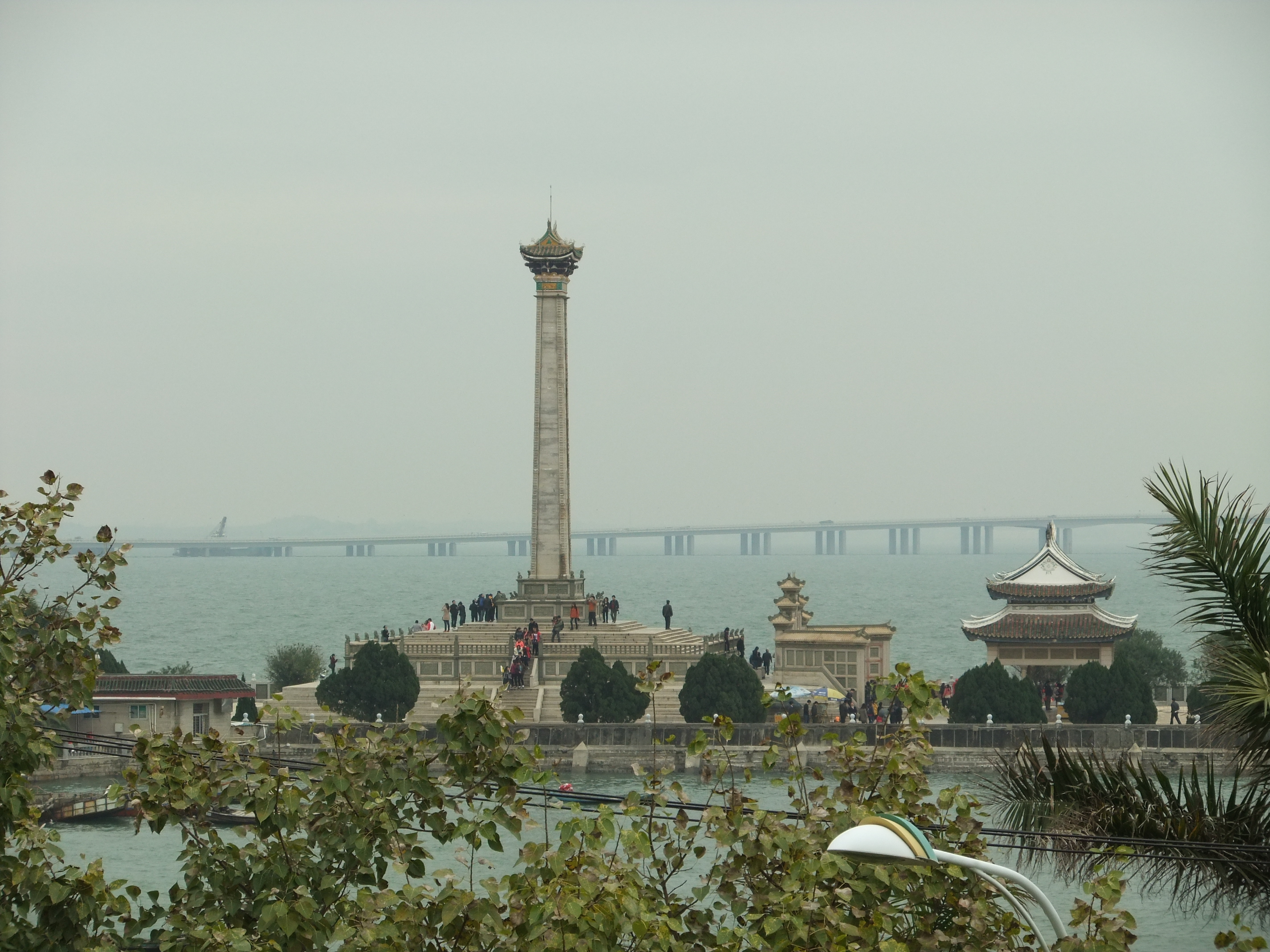
Kah Kee Park and Turtle Garden in Jimei, Xiamen, Fujian, China.

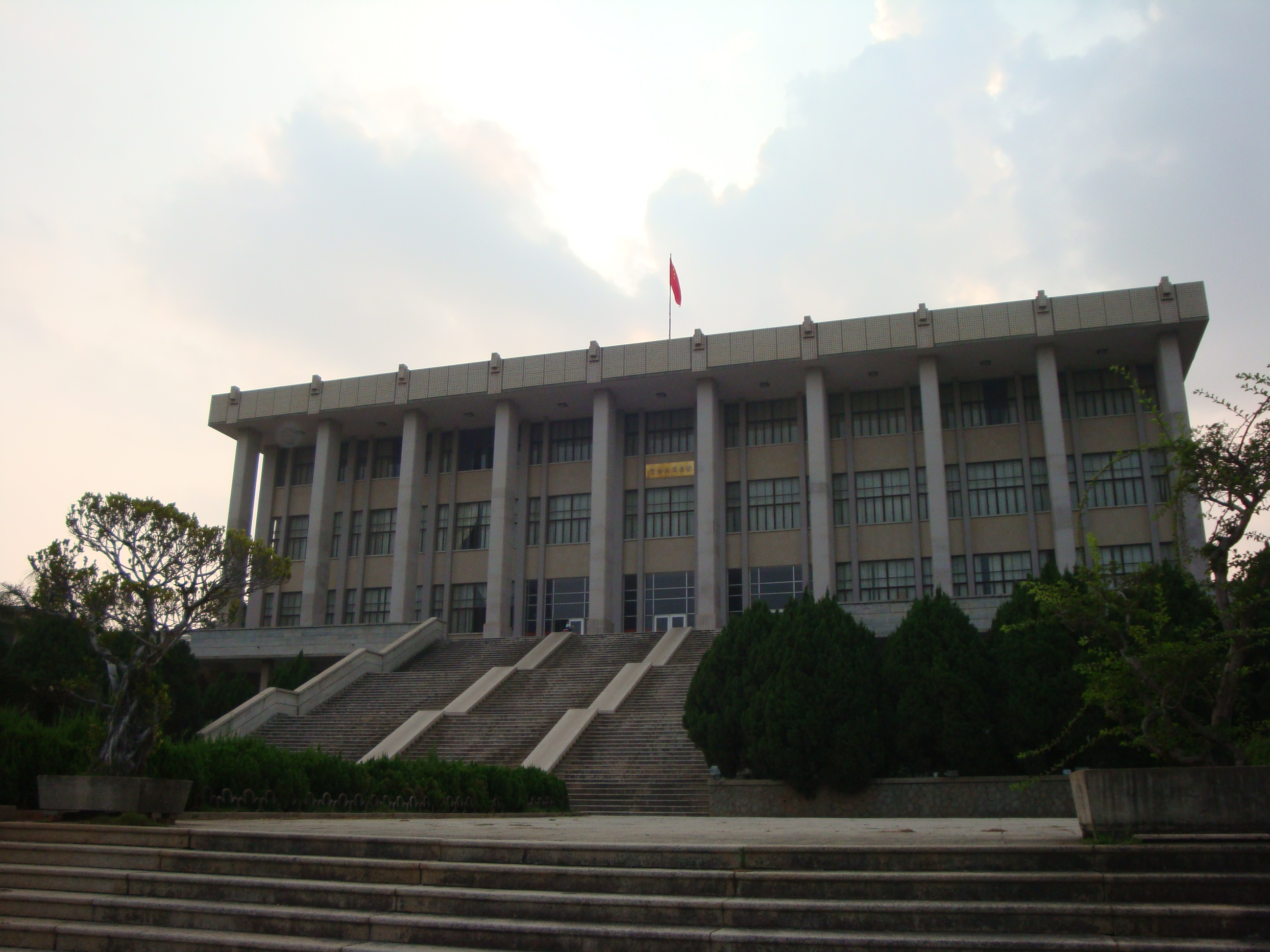
Tan Kah Kee Memorial Hall in Huaqiao University, Quanzhou, Fujian, China.

== See also ==
- Tan Kah Kee MRT station, a train station in Singapore named after Tan Kah Kee
- Lee Kong Chian, Tan Kah Kee's son-in-law, who was also a businessman
