= John Ng =

Chinese martial artist

John Wing-Lok Ng
- Born: 1950 (age 75–76); Fujian, China
- Style: Liu He Men Six Harmonies Jiang Rongqiao Baguazhang Drunken Monkey

Wing Lok "John" Ng (born Wing-Lok Ng) is an instructor of Chinese martial arts, a master of Six Harmony (Liu He Men), Baguazhang, and Drunken Monkey kung fu. He was born in Fujian in 1950, of Hui Chinese descent. He is a Traditional Chinese medicine doctor and pharmacist specializing in herbalism.

== Career ==
In 1981 he founded the Four Seasons Kung Fu & Wu Shu Academy in Richmond, Kentucky and later in Lexington, which flourished during the 1980s and early 1990s. John Ng was Executive Advisor to The International Chinese Boxing Association in 2006 and 2008. He is now semi-retired, but still teaches a small number of private students. John Ng founded the Bowling Green Martial Arts and Health Club in Bowling Green, Kentucky in 1974.

== Filmography ==
He was martial arts choreographer for the film Snake in the Monkey's Shadow (aka. Hou hsing kou shou aka. Snake Fist vs. the Dragon) produced by Goldig Films Ltd. in 1979.

== Lineage ==
Lineage
Baguazhang	Wang Zi-Ping
Five Animal	Monk Inh Shu One
Spring Legs	Monk Po In
Monkey	CoGo & Chan Jack Man
Liu He Quan	Chan Jack Man
Northern Drunken	Li & Chan Jack Man
