= Huli, Xiamen =

Huli 湖里区
- District
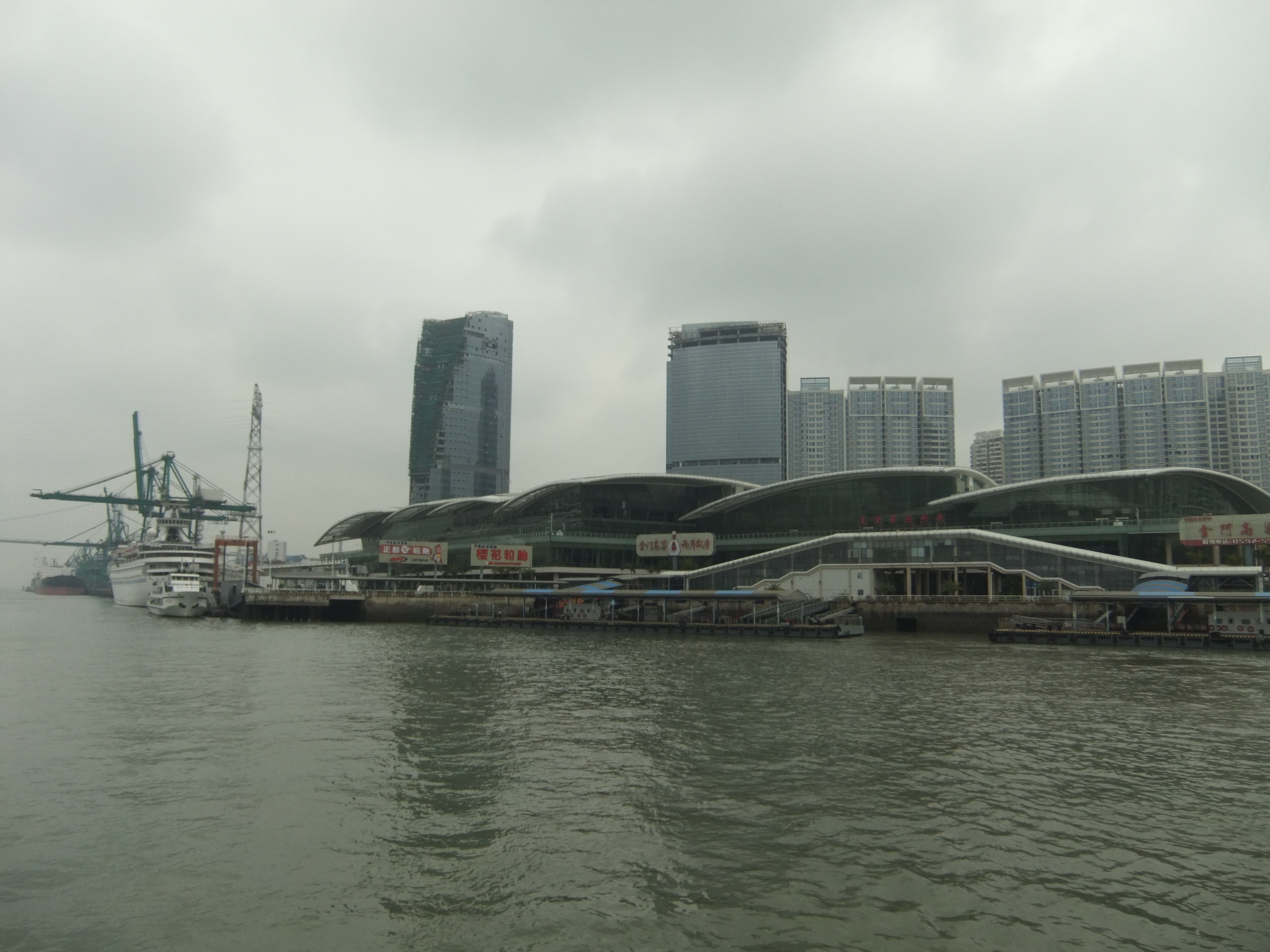
- International Cruise Terminal (Dongdu Ferry Terminal) and other port facilities on the west coast of Xiamen Island, within Huli District

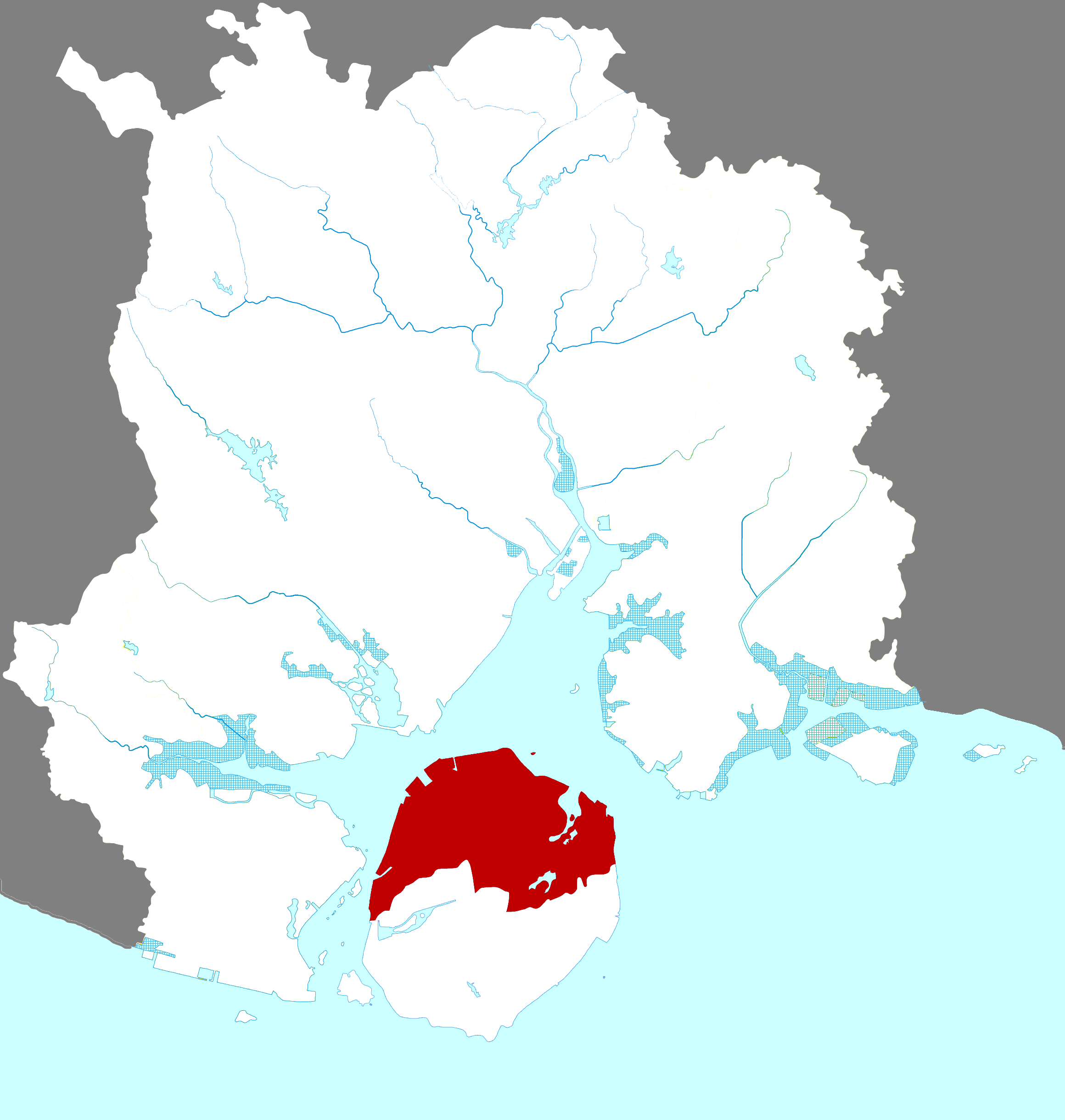
- Location Huli in Xiamen

- Location in Fujian
- Coordinates: 24°31′14″N 118°8′36″E
- Country: China
- Province: Fujian
- Prefecture-level city: Xiamen
- District seat: Heshan (禾山镇)

Area
  - Total: 61.41 km^{2} (23.71 sq mi)

Population (2020)
  - Total: 1,036,974
  - Density: 16,890/km^{2} (43,730/sq mi)
- Time zone: UTC+8 (China Standard)
- Postal code: 361006
- Area code: 0592
- Website: www.huli.gov.cn

Huli (simplified Chinese: 湖里区; traditional Chinese: 湖里區; pinyin: Húlǐ Qū; Pe̍h-ōe-jī: Ô͘-lí-khu) is one of the administrative districts of the city of Xiamen, Fujian, China.

== Geography ==
Huli District occupies the northern half of Xiamen Island, with 3 sides facing the narrow ocean straits that separate Xiamen Island from China's mainland. (The southern half of the island, where Xiamen downtown is, forms Siming District).

Huli is the heart of Xiamen Special Economic Zone. It was founded as a district in November 1987. Huli District administers Jiangtou, Heshan, Jingshan, Huli and Dianqian. It covers a land area of 61.41 square kilometres (23.71 sq mi), which is 46.33% of the entire island. The coastline is 24 kilometres (15 mi). Huli District is the centre for commerce, science, education, sports, tourism and culture.

== Administrative divisions ==
=== Subdistricts ===
- Jinshan Subdistrict (金山街道)
- Huli Subdistrict (湖里街道)
- Dianqian Subdistrict (殿前街道)
- Heshan Subdistrict (禾山街道)
- Jiangtou Subdistrict (江头街道)

== Economy ==
Huli District's GDP in 2002 was 3.561 billion yuan. The total economic value was 7.127 billion yuan. The Per capita net income of the residents was 8250 yuan. By the end of 2002, the total population of Huli District was 127,200. This made 44,400 households. The total population of urban residents is 101,900 which consists of 80.11% of the total population. By the start of 2006, local residents were up to 440,000, including 320,000 from other places. This is equal to 72.73% of entire population.

== Infrastructure ==
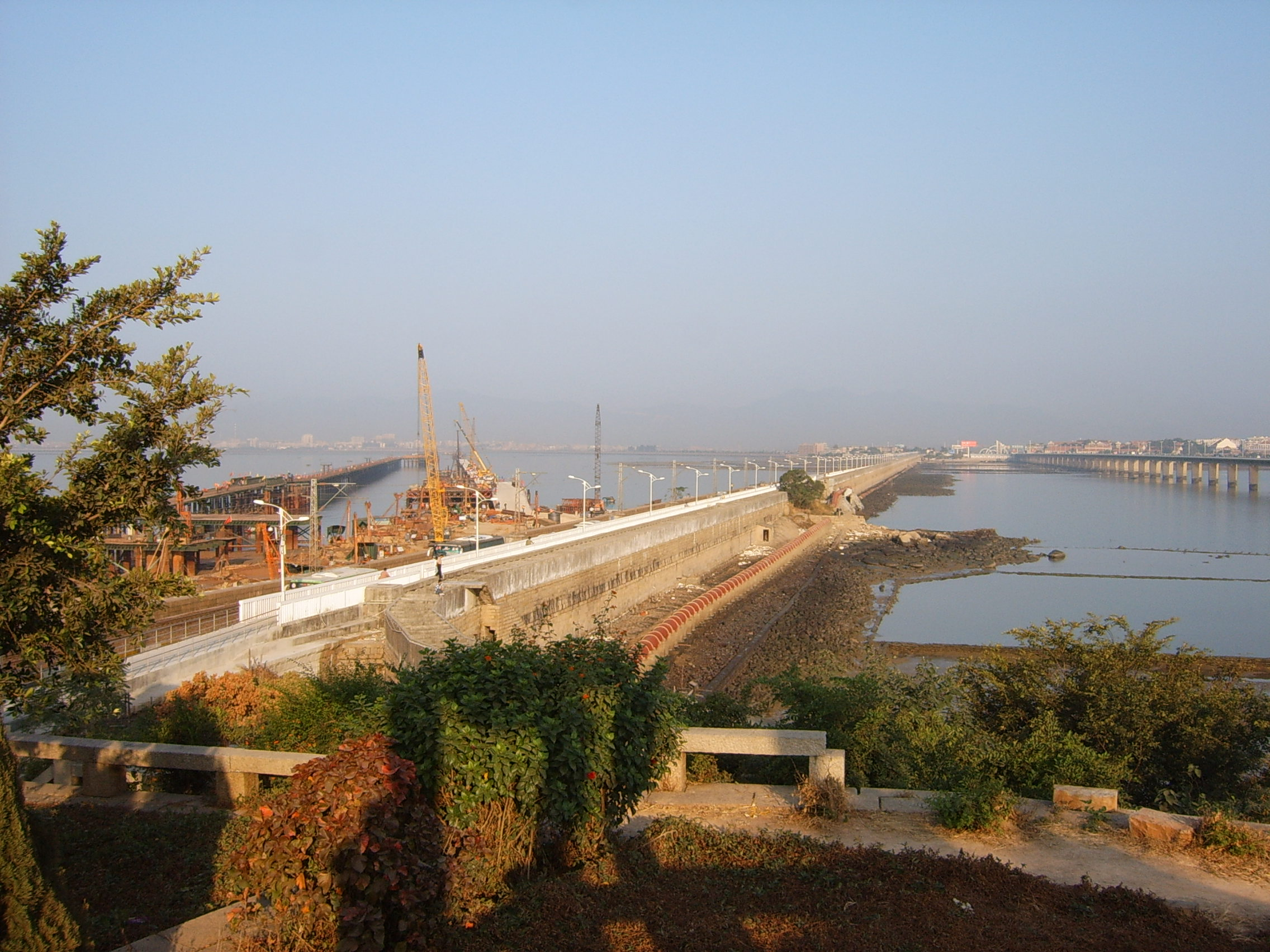
The Gao-Ji causeway (middle), Xinglin Bridge (left) and Xiamen Bridge (right) connect Huli District with the mainland Jimei District

Huli District has very modern and developed infrastructure, such as the Xiamen Gaoqi International Airport, Gaoqi Railway Station (formerly Xiamen North Railway Station; not to be confused with the new Xiamen North Railway Station, in Jimei District), municipal road network, regional road network, city communication network and water, electricity, gas and sewage disposal system. The northern coast of Huli District boast a deep water port.

As of 2020, Huli has 23 metro stations and is the district with the highest density of transportation infrastructure.

== Gallery ==
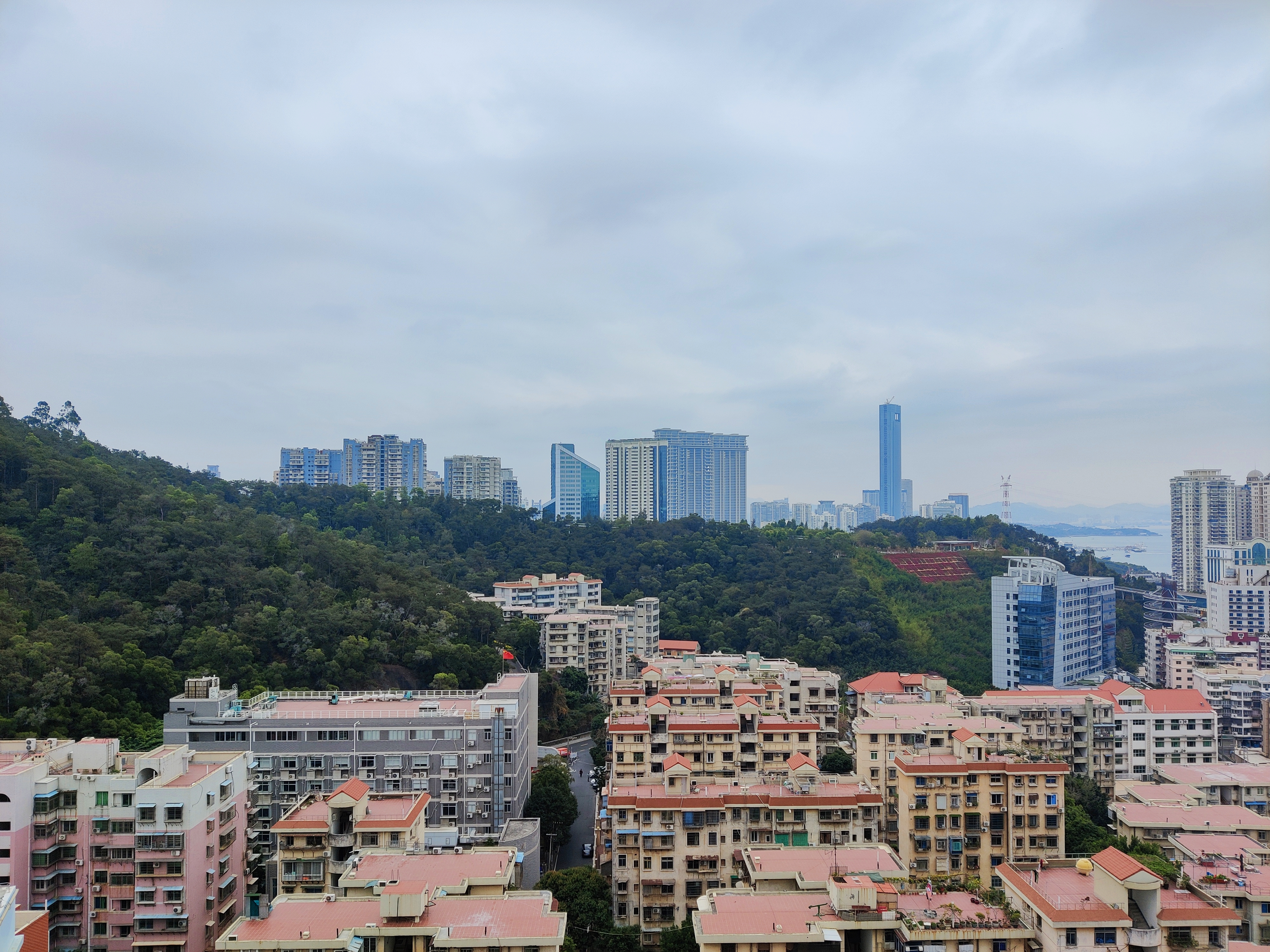
View from the Dongdu Residential Area, Huli District, Xiamen

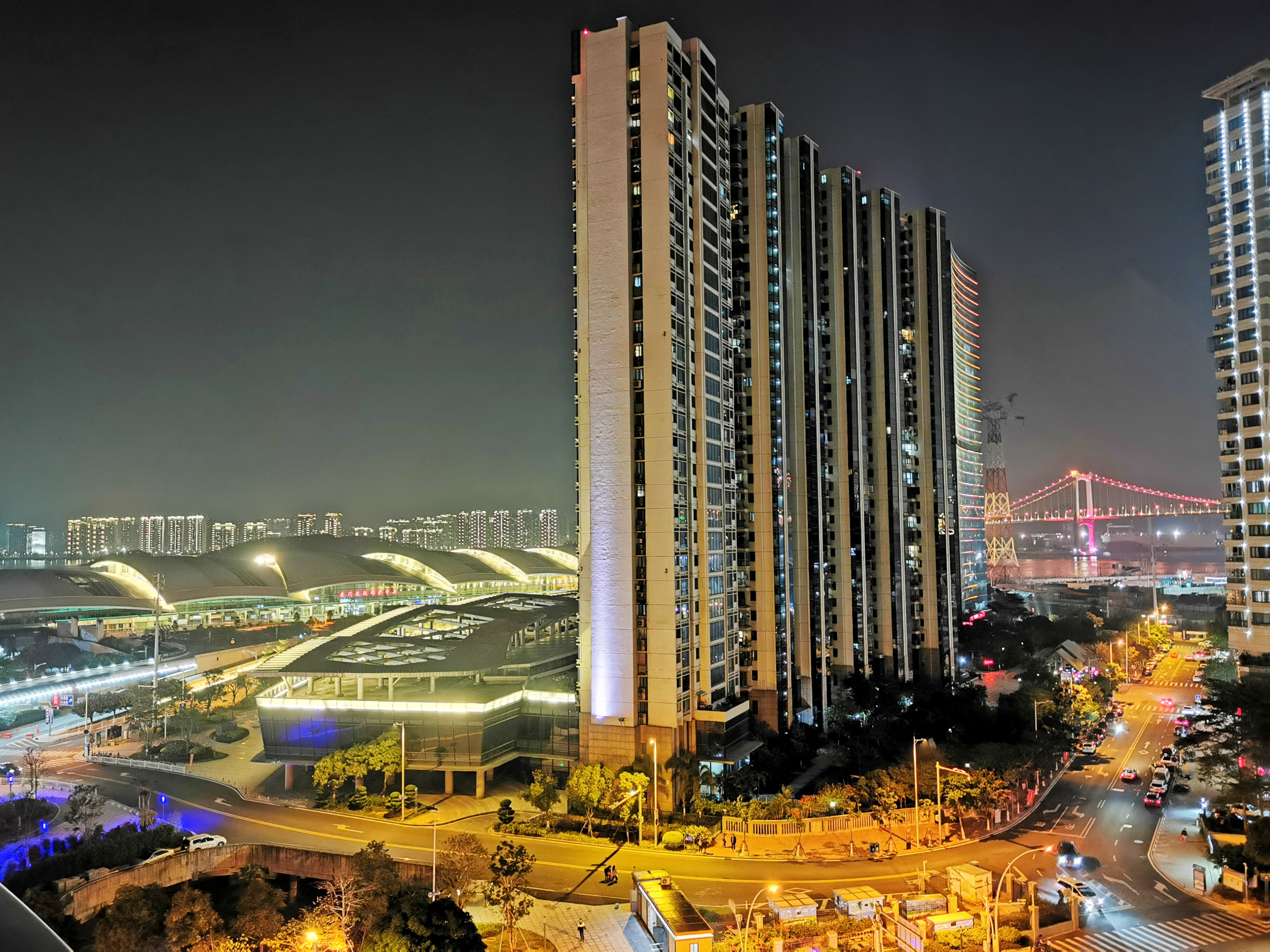
View of the Xiamen International Cruise Terminal and Haicang Bridge from Huweishan Park

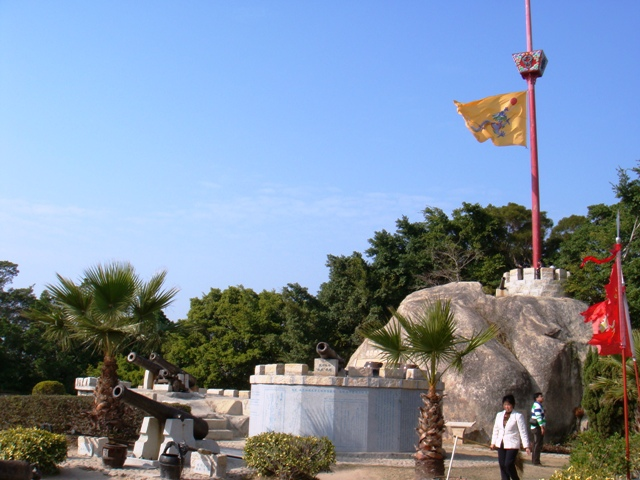
Hulishan Fortress

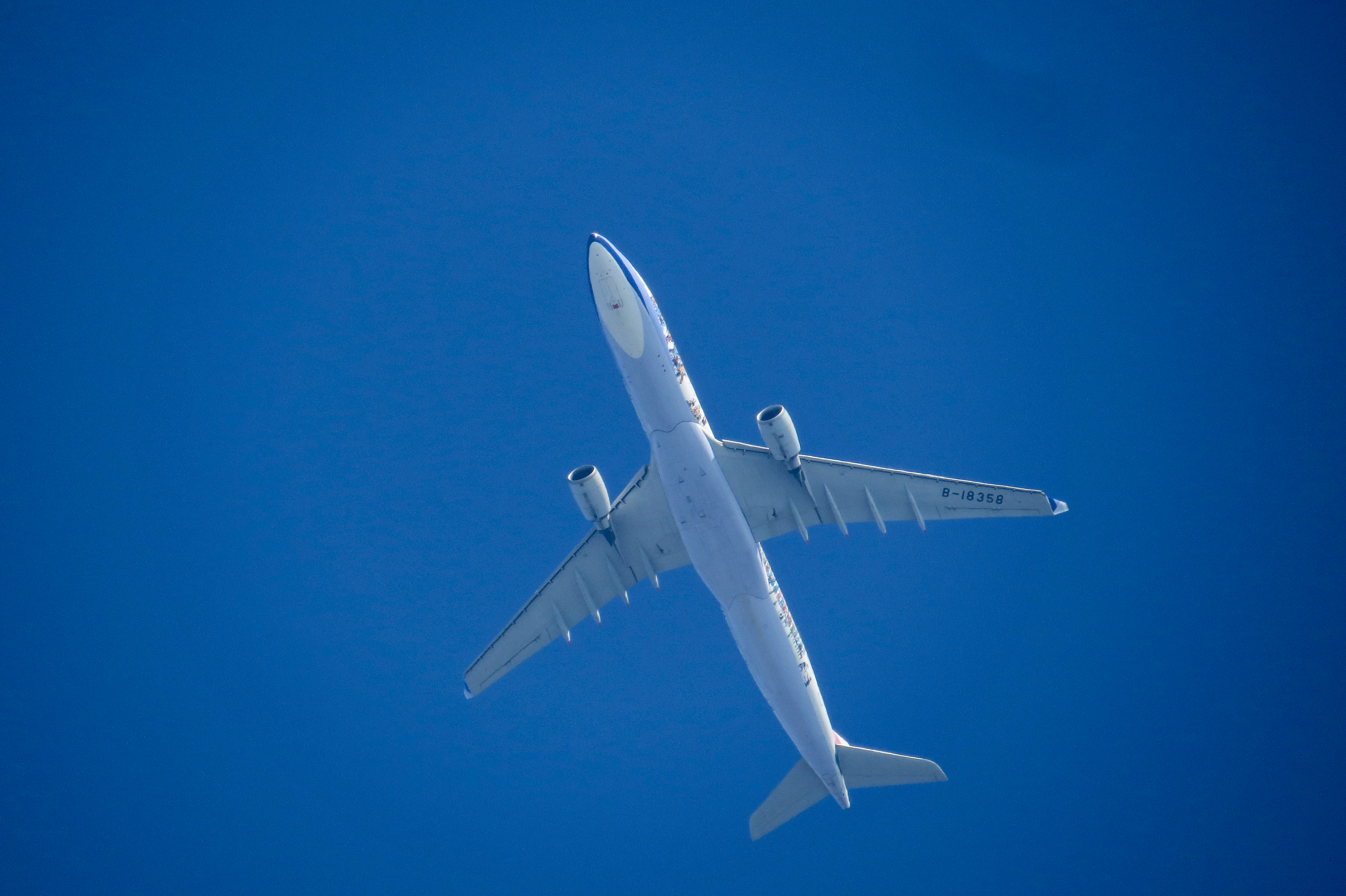
Plane flying over Huli

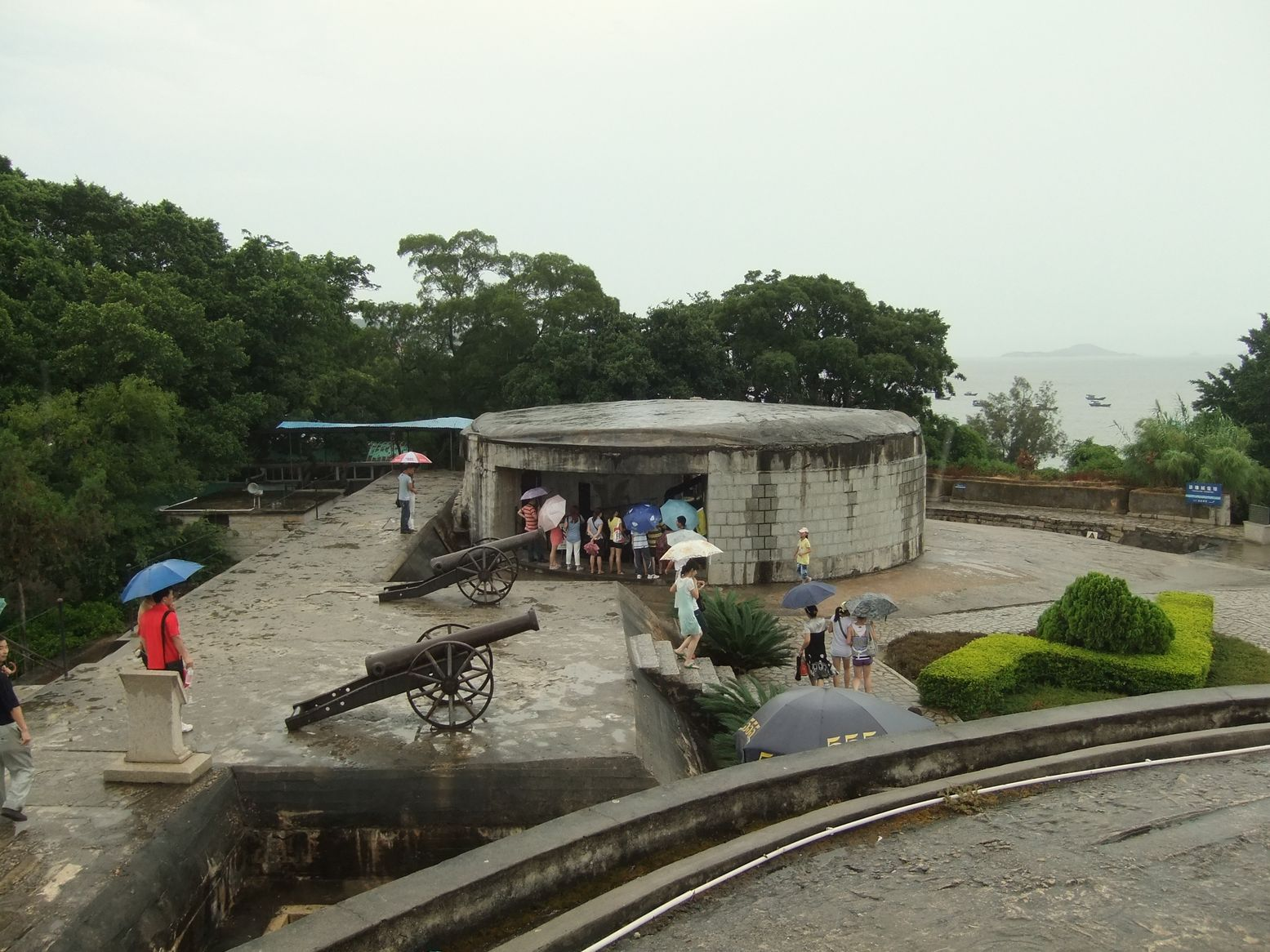
Hulishan Fortress
