= Jimei University =

Provincial public university in Xiamen, Fujian, China

Coordinates: 24.577646°N 118.09438°E

- 集美大学 (Chinese)
- Motto: 诚毅
- Motto in English: Sincerity and Fortitude
- Type: Public university
- Established: 1918
- Academic staff: 2,300
- Students: 21,300
- Undergraduates: 17,847
- Postgraduates: Y
- Location: Xiamen, Fujian, China
- Campus: Urban
- Website: jmu.edu.cn

Chinese name
- Simplified Chinese: 集美大学
- Traditional Chinese: 集美大學
Transcriptions
Standard Mandarin
- Hanyu Pinyin: Jíměi Dàxué
Southern Min
- Hokkien POJ: Pe̍h-ōe-jī

Jimei University (JMU; 集美大学) is a provincial public university in Jimei District, Xiamen, Fujian, China. It is affiliated with the province of Fujian, and co-funded by the Fujian Provincial People's Government, the Ministry of Transport, the Ministry of Natural Resources, and the Xiamen Municipal People's Government.

The earliest predecessors of the school, founded by Chinese businessman Tan Kah Kee, were the Teachers Department of Jimei School established in 1918, and the Department of Fisheries and the Department of Business of Jimei School established in 1920.

In 1994, the current Jimei University was established through the merger of the then Jimei Teachers Senior Vocational School (集美师范高等专科学校), Jimei Navigation College (集美航海学院), Jimei Finance and Economics Senior Vocational School (集美财经高等专科学校), Xiamen Fisheries College (厦门水产学院), and Fujian Sports College (福建体育学院).

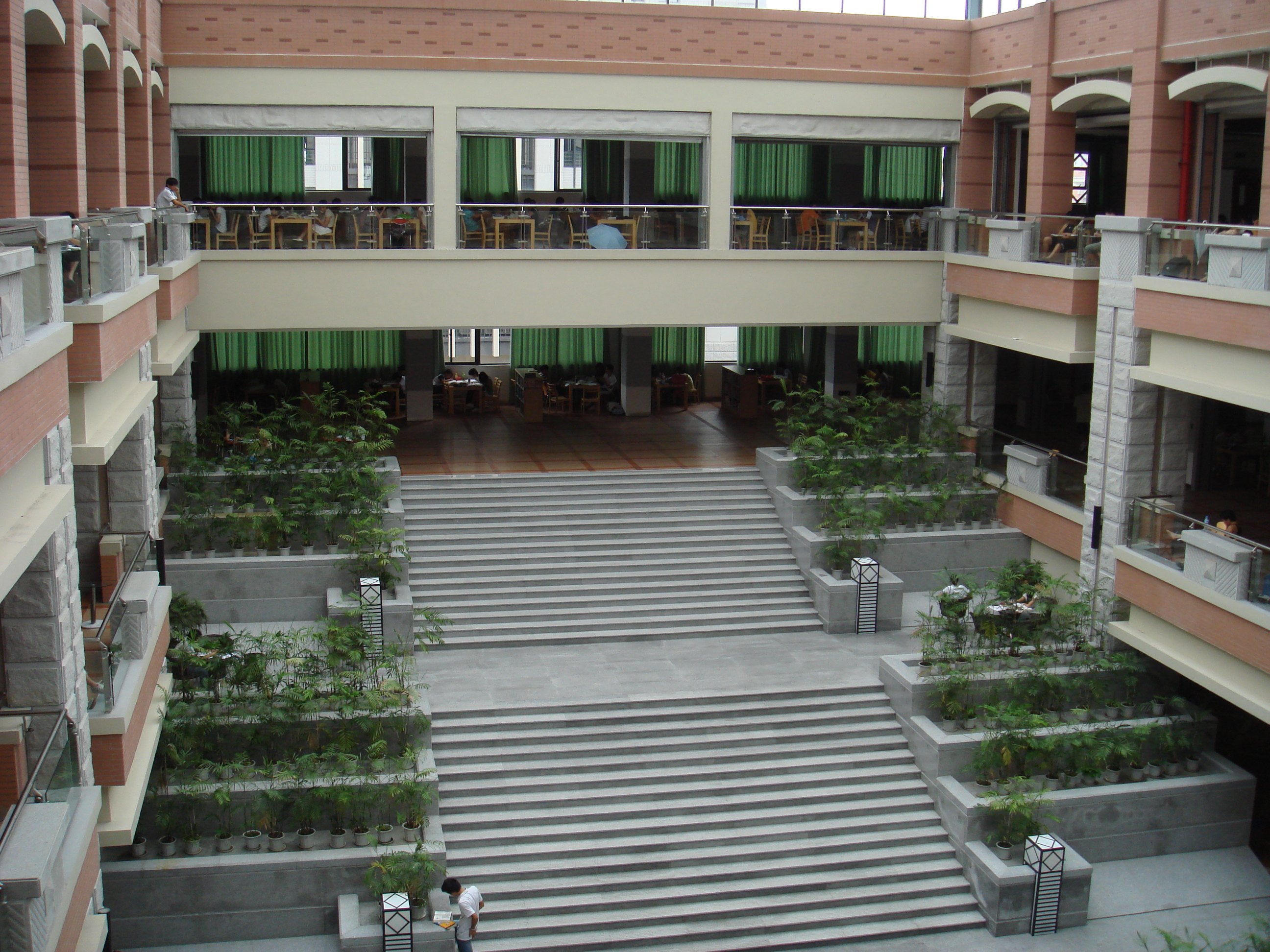
Jimei University library.
