= Jimei, Xiamen =

Jimei 集美区 Chi-mei
- District
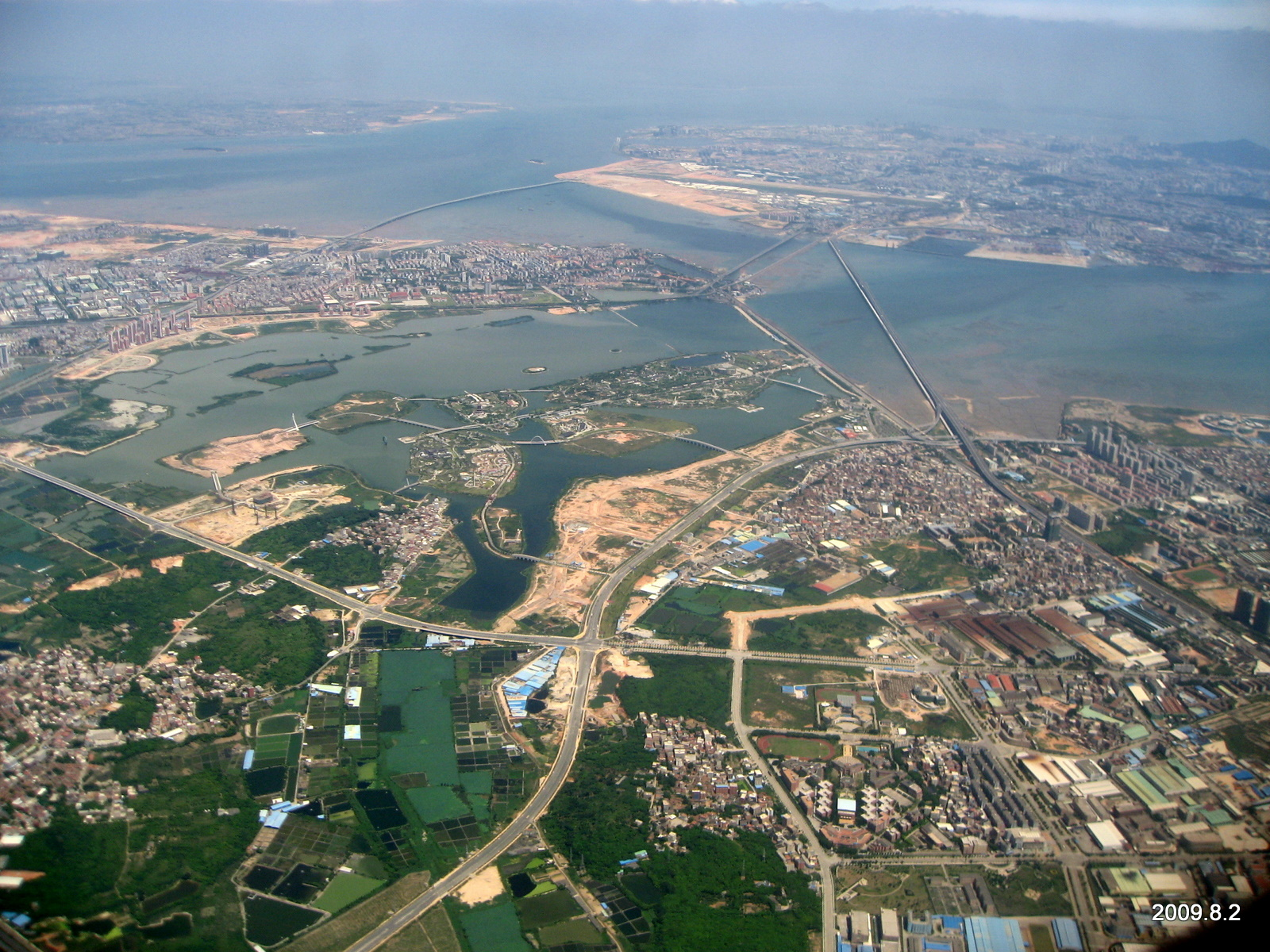
- An aerial view of Jimei District (foreground and center), connected by numerous bridges with Xiamen Island's Huli District (in the background right, including Xiamen Gaoqi International Airport).

- Location in Fujian
- Coordinates: 24°38′31″N 118°05′51″E
- Country: China
- Province: Fujian
- Sub-provincial city: Xiamen

Area
  - Total: 253.5 km^{2} (97.9 sq mi)

Population (2020 census)
  - Total: 1,036,987
  - Density: 4,091/km^{2} (10,590/sq mi)
- Time zone: UTC+8 (China Standard)

Jimei (simplified Chinese: 集美区; traditional Chinese: 集美區; pinyin: Jíměi Qū; Pe̍h-ōe-jī: Chi̍p-bí-khu) is one of six districts of Xiamen, Fujian, China. Founded in 1992, with an area of 270 square kilometres (100 sq mi), in 2003 it gained some territory in a reorganisation of district governments.

The total local resident population is 1,036,987 (2020 census). Jimei District has a rich history and vibrant culture. It hosts modern facilities such as universities, a culture center, cinema, stadium, library and culture square.

== Administration ==
=== Street Committee (街道, jiedao) ===
- Jimei (Chi-mei)
- Xinglin
- Qiaoying

=== Town (镇, zhen) ===
- Xinglin
- Guankou
- Houxi

== Transportation ==
Xiamen Bridge and the 2008 Jimei Bridge connect Jimei to Xiamen island. The former was for long the only mainland gateway to the Xiamen Special Economic Zone. The strategically important high speed rail hub Xiamen North Railway Station is located in Jimei District. Line 1 of the Xiamen Metro connects Jimei with Xiamen Island since 2017.

== Education ==
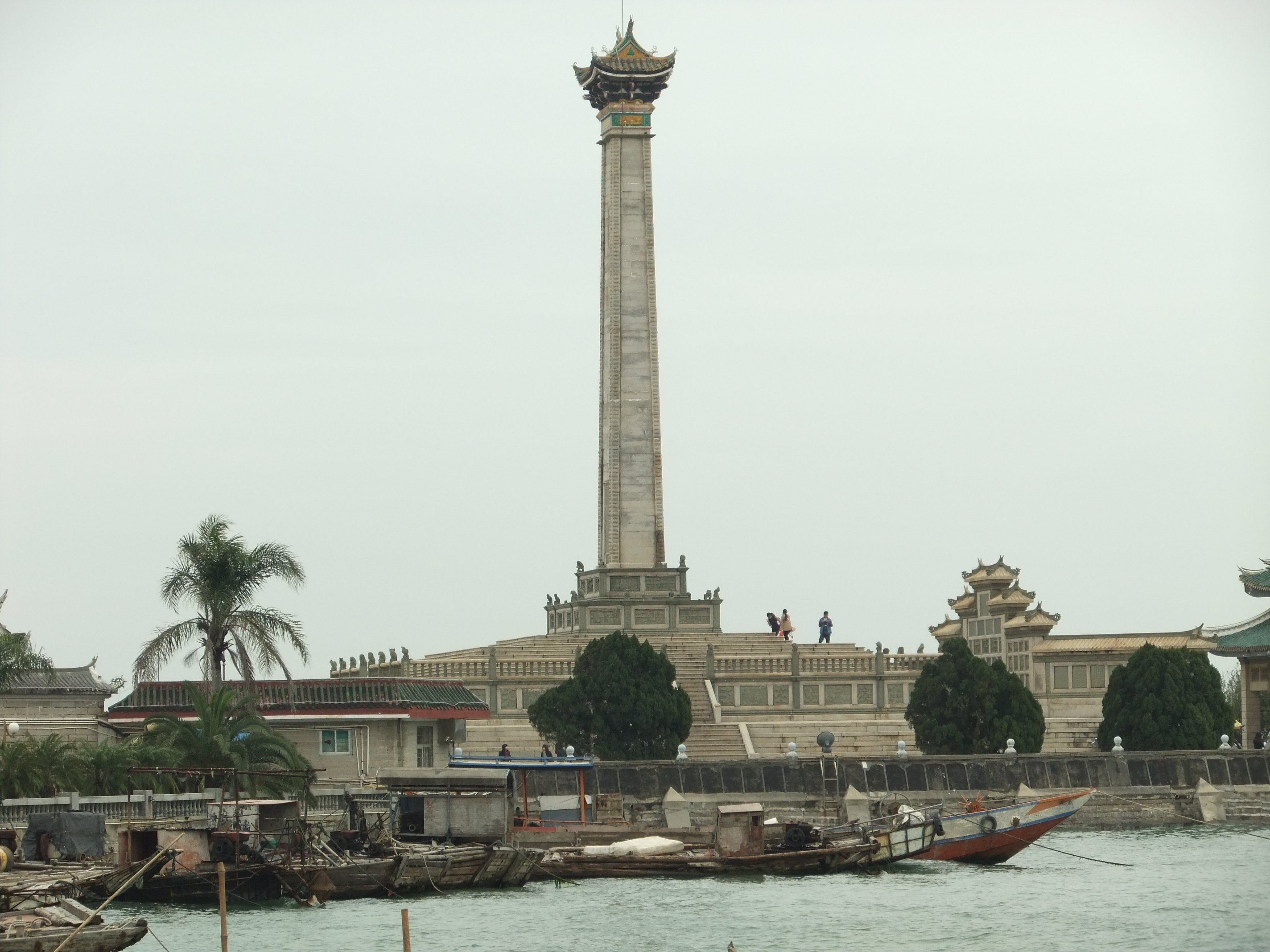
Kah Kee Park

Jimei is the educational hub of Xiamen with over 90 years of history. The famous overseas Chinese, Chen Jiageng, established the Jimei Educational Institution. This is a complete educational system which consists of kindergarten, primary school, middle school to high school. He was also influential in the establishment of universities such as Jimei University and Huaqiao University.

== Economy ==
Jimei, now together with the built-up core of the former Xinglin district, is one of the districts in the Xiamen municipal region targeted at Taiwanese investments. In the last ten years, economic activity has grown substantially in Jimei. It is a hub for services, basic and manufacturing industries. Jimei District attracted 610 foreign investment projects with value of US$2.693 billion. The total GDP of the district reached 8.335 billion yuan.

It now has the north industrial area, Xingbie industrial area, Guangnan industrial area, Central Asia industrial area and Xingna Industrial area.

=== Jimei Foreign Investment Bureau ===
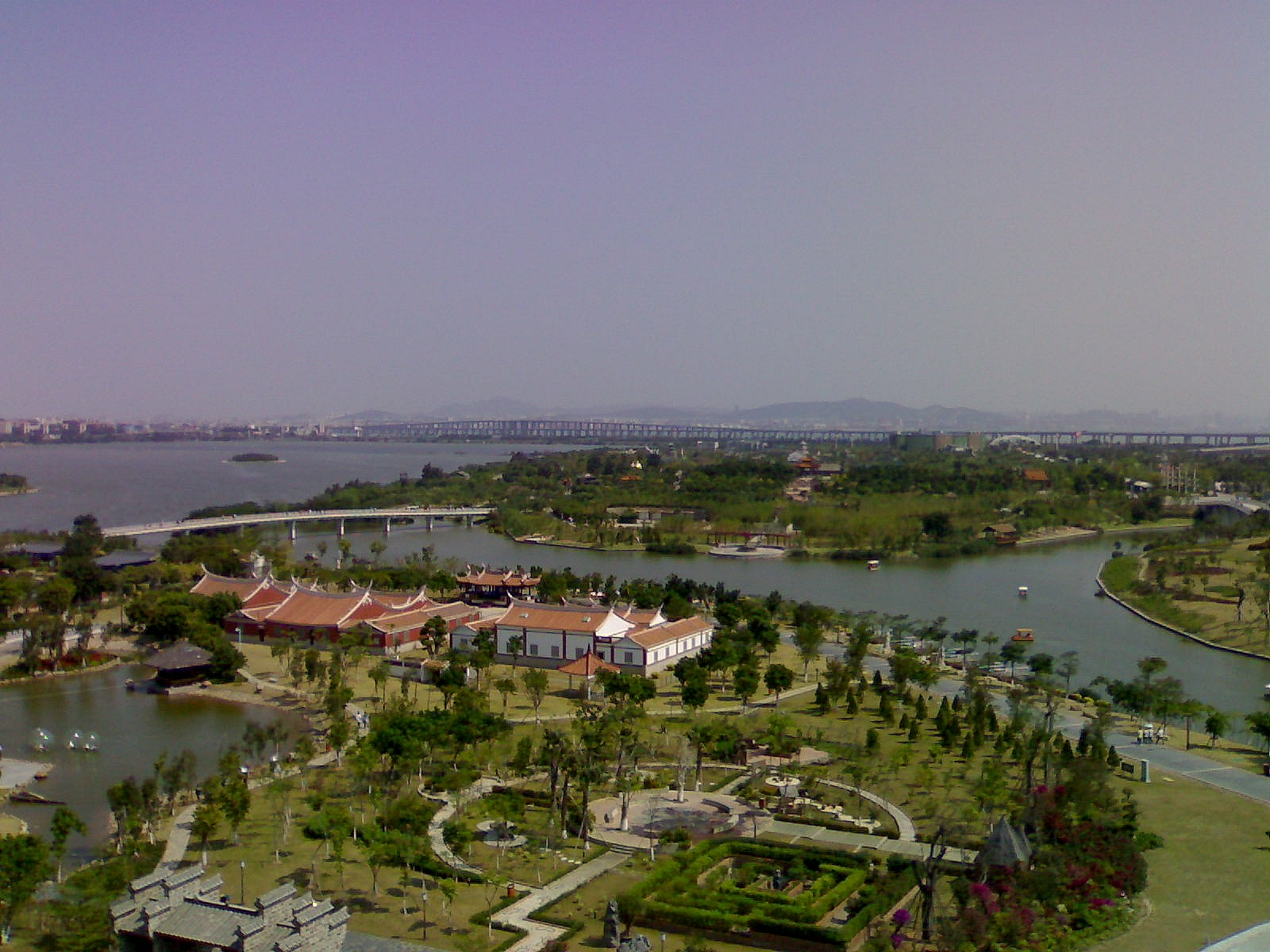
A new park by the Xinglin Bay

Jimei Foreign Investment Bureau is located in the north of Jimei and is on the west side of Fuxia Road. The zone was approved to be established in December 1992 by the State Council. The current developed zone is 6.85 km^{2}. The zone is located in the Jimei, Xiamen. The main industries encouraged are electronics, metallurgy and garment. The zone is 9 km away from the Xiamen Gaoqi International Airport and 4.5 km away from the 319 National Highway.

=== Xinglin Taiwan Merchants Development Zone ===
Xinglin Taiwan Merchants Development Zone was approved to be established on 20 May 1989 by the State Council. The planned area is 19.36 square kilometres (7.47 sq mi) and the current area is 12.5 square kilometres (4.8 sq mi). The zone is located in the district. The main industries encouraged in the zone are chemistry, machinery, textile and electronics. The zone is 8 kilometres (5.0 mi) away from the Xiamen Gaoqi International Airport and 3 kilometres (1.9 mi) away from the 319 National Highway.
