= Cross-strait propaganda =

Propaganda messages across the Taiwan Strait

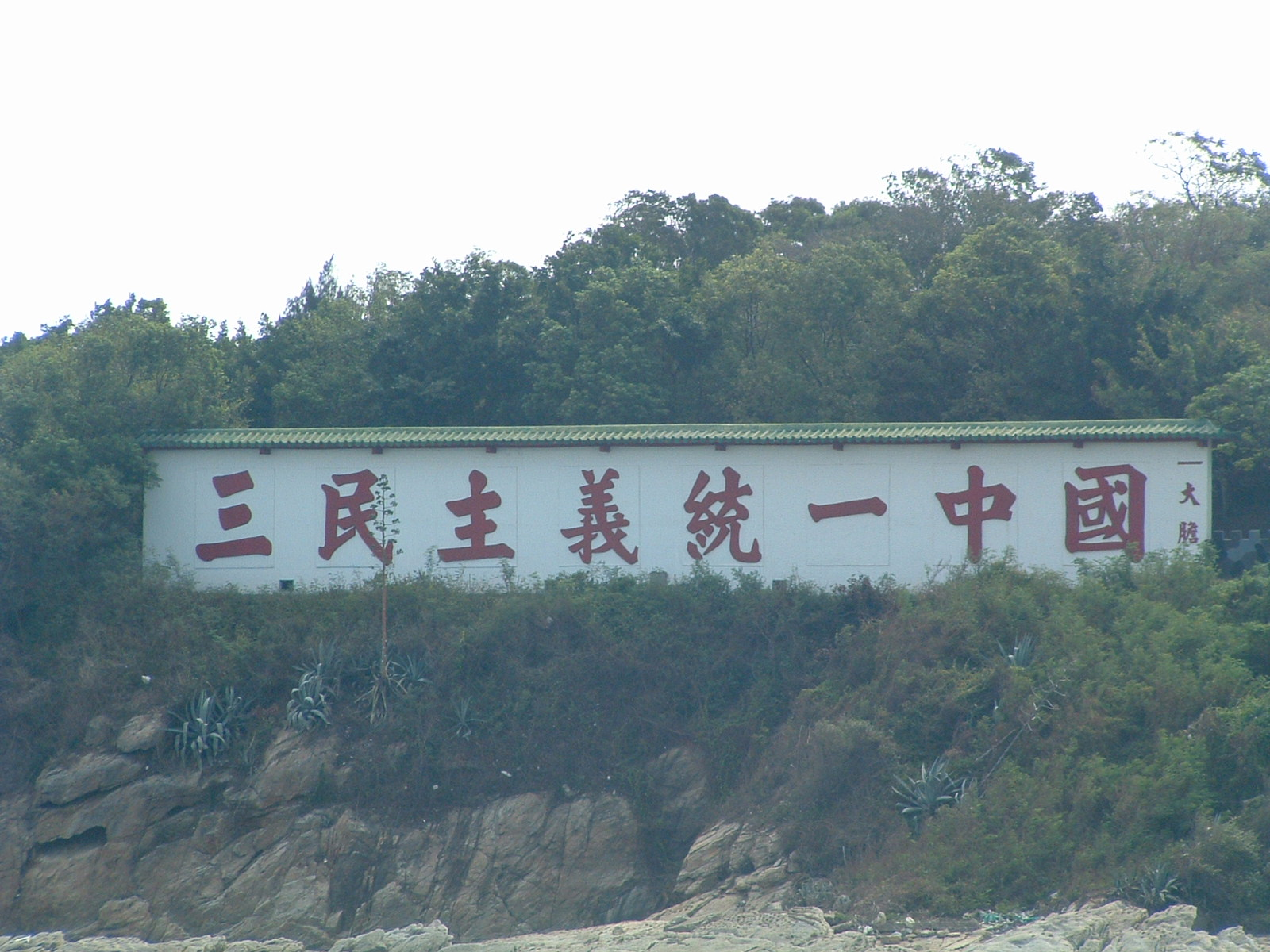
A propaganda sign on Kinmen (ROC) facing Xiamen (PRC) proclaiming "Three Principles of the People unite China" by Gen. Zhao in Aug. 1986, who was deposed after the 1987 Lieyu Massacre

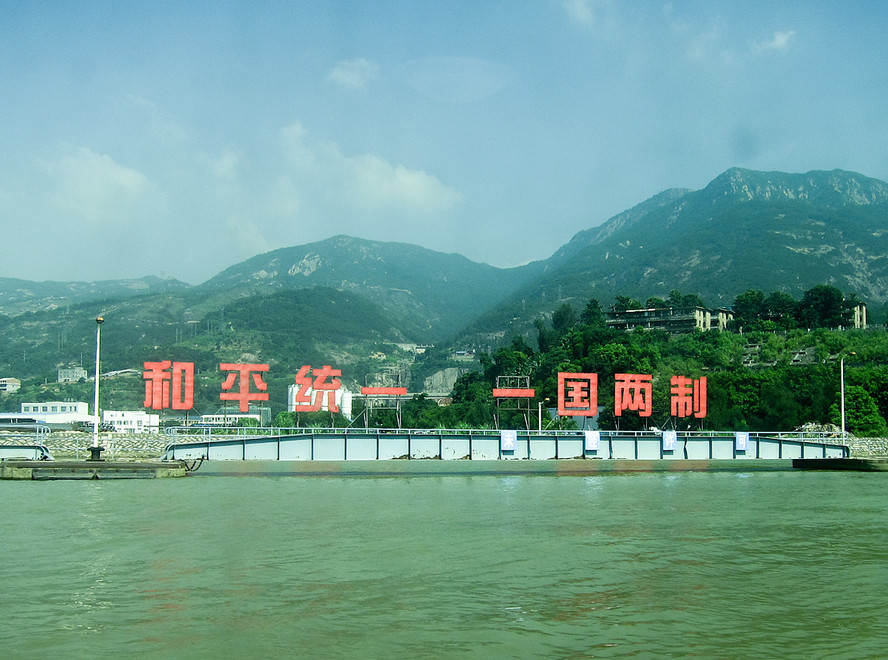
A propaganda sign on Mawei (PRC) facing Matsu (ROC) proclaiming "Peacefully uniting China: One country, two systems."

Campaigns have been made by the Republic of China on Taiwan and the People's Republic of China on the mainland. Many of these were aimed at turning military personnel against each other's regimes and encouraging them to defect. Such activities began after the end of the Chinese Civil War and did not stop until 1990. However, some creations of this era are still in use today, such as signs facing away from their country of origin. Both sides used megaphones and radio stations for broadcasting, and balloons and floating carriers for sending leaflets and other objects. Defectors came from both sides, bringing with them information and intelligence about their original regimes.

== Broadcasting stations ==
Broadcasting stations
Mainland China (PRC)	Taiwan (ROC)
Voice of the Strait	Voice of Han
Hunan Broadcasting System	Fu Hsing Broadcasting Station

== See also ==
- Propaganda in the People's Republic of China
- Propaganda in the Republic of China
  - Beishan Broadcasting Wall
  - Mashan Broadcasting and Observation Station
