= Xixi =

Xixi may refer to:

== People ==
- Xi Xi (西西; born 1938), Chinese novelist and poet

== Places ==
=== Towns ===
- Xixi, Huilai County (溪西镇), town in Guangdong
- Xixi, Yongkang, Zhejiang (西溪镇), town
- Xixi, Luxi (洗溪镇), a town of Luxi County, Hunan

=== Townships ===
- Xixi Township, Yongding County, Fujian
- Xixi Township, Suichuan County, in Suichuan County, Jiangxi
- Xixi Township, Hanyuan County, in Hanyuan County, Sichuan
- Xixi Township, Xichang, in Xichang, Sichuan
- Xixi Township, Yongjia County, Zhejiang

=== Creeks ===
Xixi (西溪, "West Creek") is a fairly common hydronym in China. Examples include:

- Xixi River (Fujian), an affluent of the Jiulong in southern Fujian
- Xixi River (Xiamen), a river running to the Taiwan Strait in Xiamen

=== Other ===
- Xixi National Wetland Park (西溪国家湿地公园) in Hangzhou
