= Tong'an, Xiamen =

Tong'an 同安区 Tungan, T’ung-an
- District
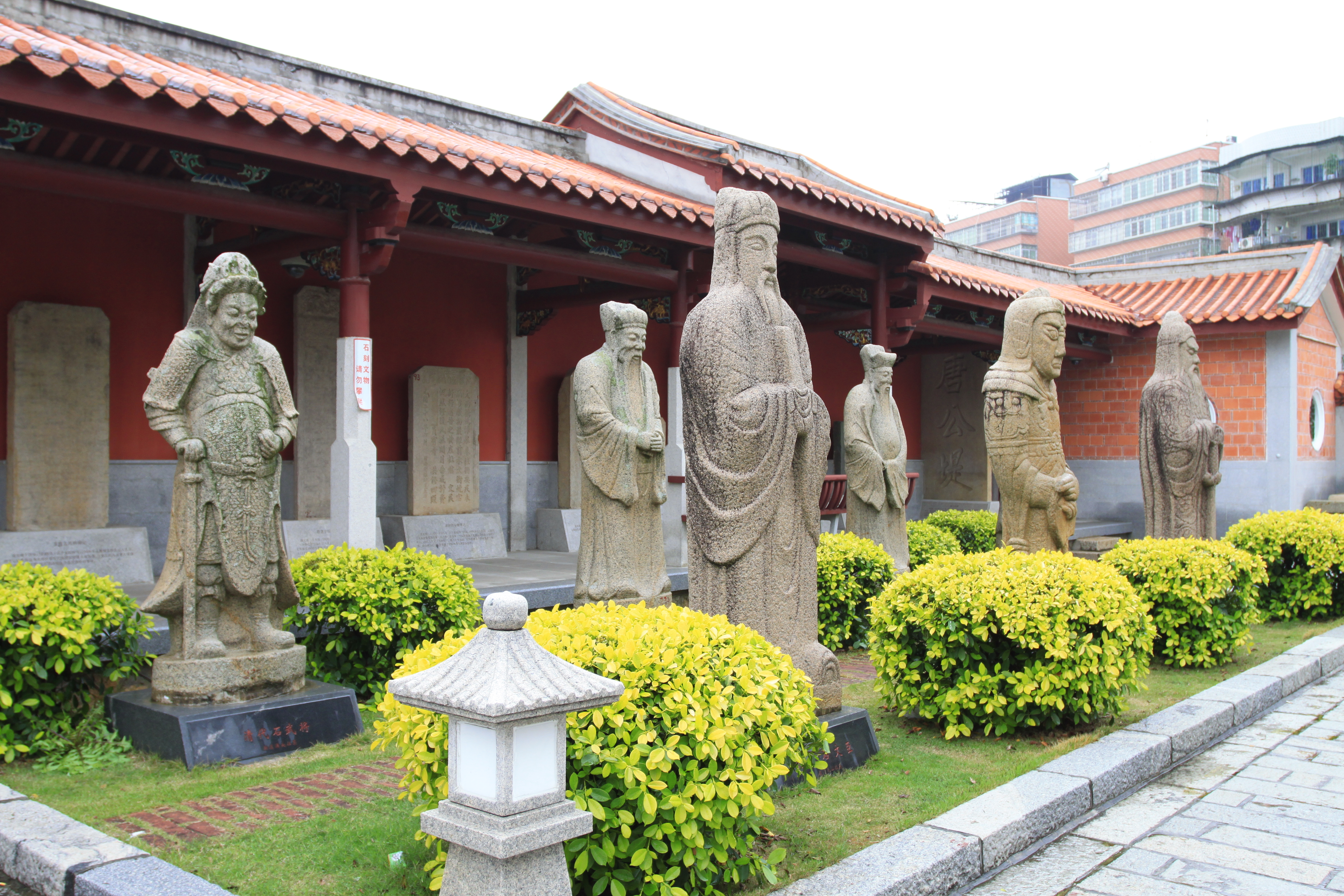
- Tong'an Confucian Temple

- Location in Fujian
- Coordinates: 24°47′21″N 118°09′09″E
- Country: People's Republic of China
- Province: Fujian
- Sub-provincial city: Xiamen

Area
  - Total: 657.59 km^{2} (253.90 sq mi)

Population (2020)
  - Total: 855,920
  - Density: 1,301.6/km^{2} (3,371.1/sq mi)
- Time zone: UTC+8 (China Standard)

Tong'an District (simplified Chinese: 同安区; traditional Chinese: 同安區; pinyin: Tóng'ān Qū; Pe̍h-ōe-jī: Tâng-oaⁿ-khu) is a northern mainland district of Xiamen which faces Quemoy County, Republic of China. To the north is Anxi and Nan'an, and to the south is Jimei. Tong'an is also east of Lianxiang and Changqin to the West. It covers 657.59 square kilometres (253.90 sq mi)

Tong'an District has a population of 855,920 residents. (2020 Census).

The District deserves a nickname of Silver City (Chinese: 銀城; pinyin: Yínchéng; Pe̍h-ōe-jī: Gûn-siâⁿ) because the old city resembled a sycee in plan view.

== Administration ==
Tong’an District administers two subdistricts: Datong and Xiang Ping. It has local authority over six towns. They are Hongtang, Wuxian, Tingxi, Xinming, Xike and Lianhua.

Tong'an District is also attracting foreign investment because of its status as a designated special economic zone in Xiamen.

== Geography ==
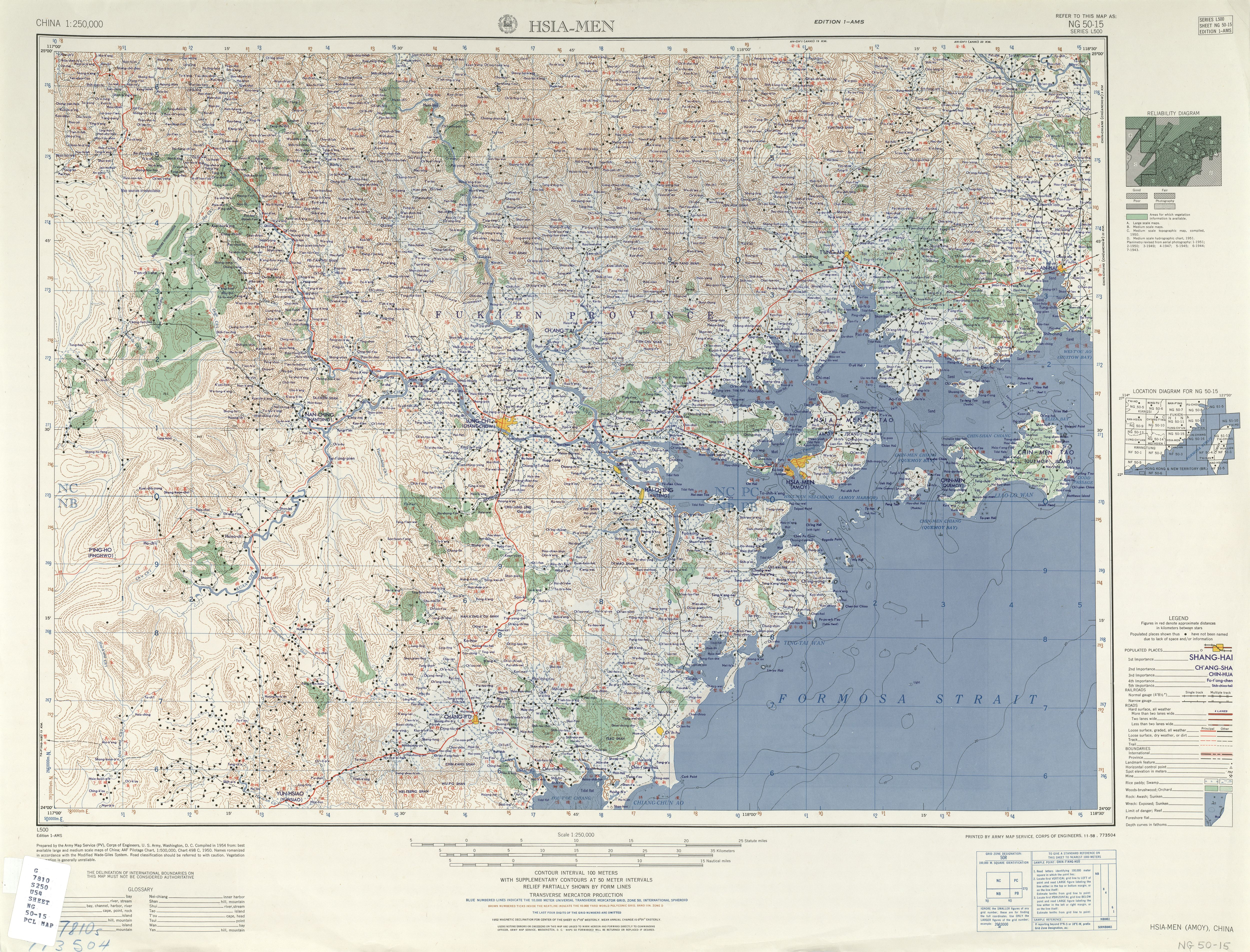
Map including Tong'an (labeled as T’UNG-AN 同安) area (1954)

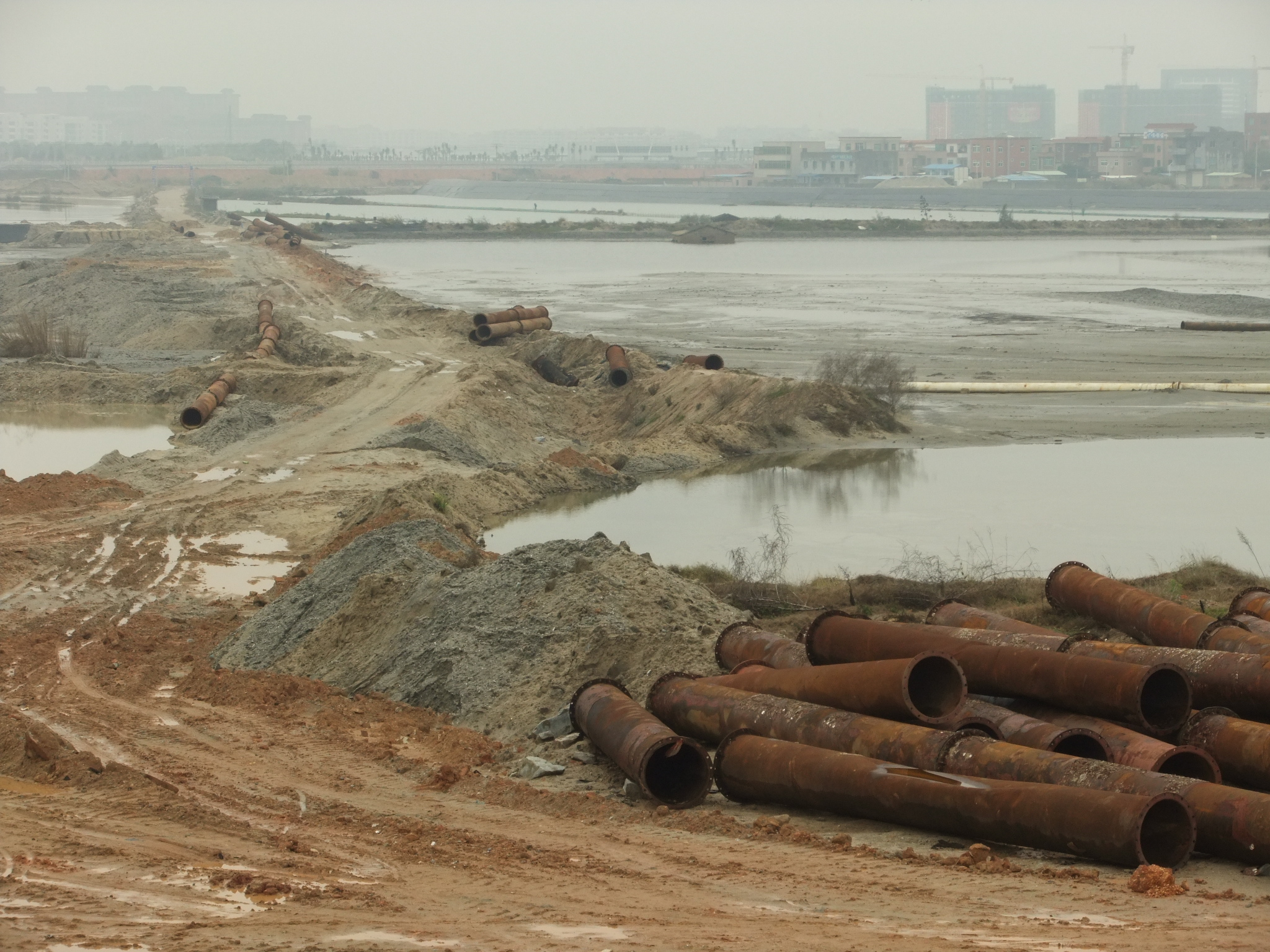
Land reclamation in progress in Bingzhou (丙州) Peninsula (formerly, island) of the Dongzui Bay

Tong'an District is almost coterminous with the basin of the Xixi River ("Western Stream"), the largest river of Xiamen City.

The Xixi starts in the Zhaijianwei Mountains (寨尖尾山) in the northwestern part of Tong'an District, and flows in the general south-eastern direction. After receiving a number of tributaries - Lianhuaxi (莲花溪, Lotus Stream), Aoxi (澳溪), Tingxi (汀溪), it merges with the Dongxi (东溪, Eastern Stream) at the place called Suangxikou (双溪口, "The confluence of two streams).

The Xixi's estuary opens into the Dongzui Harbor (东咀港), which is a bay of Taiwan Strait mostly enclosed by Tong'an District and Xiang'an District on the mainland (on the northwest and east, respectively) and by the Xiamen Island in the south. A number of large bridges have been constructed across the Xixi estuary, carrying roads and a railway between Tong'an and Xiang'an Districts (and, viewed on a larger scale, between Xiamen and Quanzhou).

== History ==
Tong'an was made a county in AD 282 during the Jin Dynasty, but its status was revoked not long after. It was again given "county" status in AD 933 under the Later Tang administration.

Prior to 1914, its jurisdiction covered regions including present day Xiamen City, Kinmen County (ROC) and the north-eastern part of Longhai City. In May 1997, Tong'an lost its county status and became a district within Xiamen.

In September 2003, 5 towns (namely Xindian, Xinxu, Maxiang, Neicuo, and Dadeng) in the eastern and south-eastern part of the then Tong'an District were split off, to form the new Xiang'an District.

== Economy ==
Tong'an has a mild sub tropical climate. This is very suitable for growing crops and plants. It is covered in natural resources such as granite, kaolin earth, mineral water and hot springs. It is emerging as a growing commercial base. The main agricultural products from Tong'an District are prawns, peanuts, longan, and pigs, fruits, vegetables, tea and herbs.

== Transport ==
Tong'an district is at the economic crossroad between Xiamen, Quanzhou and Zhangzhou prefecture level cities. It is an important transport hub because the Fuzhou-Xiamen and Zhangzhou-Quanzhou Highways pass directly through Tong'an District providing direct access to all the counties and villages. The Xiamen International Airport is only 27 km away. It is 32 km from the North Xiamen Freight Transport Railway Station.

== Climate ==
Tong'an climate is subtropical, rich rainfall in mild winters and hot summers. Winters are short, roughly 25 days and summer is hot with up to 152 days. The weather is changeable in spring, and autumn is very cool. Tong'an annual average temperature is 21.86 °C The coldest temperature is 13.9 °C in January and hottest is 28.9 °C in July. The annual average rainfall is 1543.5 mm and 2030.7 hours sunlight per year. The annual average evaporation is 1685.2mm, accumulated temperature is 57.67-77.17°C. This climate is suitable for agriculture, forestry industries, animal husbandry and fisheries.

Climate data for Tong'an, elevation 46 m (151 ft), (1991–2020 normals, extremes 1967–present)
Month	Jan	Feb	Mar	Apr	May	Jun	Jul	Aug	Sep	Oct	Nov	Dec	Year
Record high °C (°F)	28.1 (82.6)	29.5 (85.1)	29.5 (85.1)	33.2 (91.8)	38.7 (101.7)	36.4 (97.5)	39.3 (102.7)	39.5 (103.1)	37.6 (99.7)	35.2 (95.4)	32.4 (90.3)	27.8 (82.0)	39.5 (103.1)
Mean daily maximum °C (°F)	18.6 (65.5)	18.9 (66.0)	21.0 (69.8)	25.1 (77.2)	28.3 (82.9)	30.9 (87.6)	33.3 (91.9)	33.1 (91.6)	31.9 (89.4)	28.9 (84.0)	25.2 (77.4)	20.8 (69.4)	26.3 (79.4)
Daily mean °C (°F)	13.8 (56.8)	14.3 (57.7)	16.5 (61.7)	20.6 (69.1)	24.2 (75.6)	27.1 (80.8)	29.0 (84.2)	28.7 (83.7)	27.5 (81.5)	24.3 (75.7)	20.6 (69.1)	16.0 (60.8)	21.9 (71.4)
Mean daily minimum °C (°F)	10.6 (51.1)	11.2 (52.2)	13.3 (55.9)	17.3 (63.1)	21.2 (70.2)	24.3 (75.7)	25.7 (78.3)	25.5 (77.9)	24.3 (75.7)	20.9 (69.6)	17.2 (63.0)	12.6 (54.7)	18.7 (65.6)
Record low °C (°F)	−1.0 (30.2)	4.0 (39.2)	1.7 (35.1)	10.4 (50.7)	12.9 (55.2)	17.3 (63.1)	21.9 (71.4)	22.2 (72.0)	19.0 (66.2)	13.4 (56.1)	6.3 (43.3)	0.0 (32.0)	−1.0 (30.2)
Average precipitation mm (inches)	43.1 (1.70)	70.5 (2.78)	100.3 (3.95)	115.8 (4.56)	197.8 (7.79)	281.5 (11.08)	192.5 (7.58)	258.6 (10.18)	147.6 (5.81)	43.2 (1.70)	38.4 (1.51)	40.9 (1.61)	1,530.2 (60.25)
Average precipitation days (≥ 0.1 mm)	6.7	10.0	13.6	12.9	15.6	16.6	11.6	13.6	9.8	3.8	4.2	5.5	123.9
Average relative humidity (%)	70	74	75	76	78	82	78	78	72	64	66	66	73
Mean monthly sunshine hours	140.3	104.2	108.0	124.3	132.0	146.2	233.2	206.9	187.9	193.6	164.9	156.9	1,898.4
Percentage possible sunshine	42	32	29	33	32	36	56	52	51	54	51	48	43
Source: China Meteorological Administrationall-time extreme temperaturesAll-time May extremesAll-time July high

== Notable people ==
- Koh Lay Huan (辜禮歡甲, died 1826), Chinese-born businessman who became the first Kapitan Cina (Chinese Kapitan) of Penang
- Souw Beng Kong (1580-1644), the first Kapitan Cina of Batavia
