= Xixi River (Xiamen) =

River in Fujian, China

Coordinates: 24.728268°N 118.145844°E

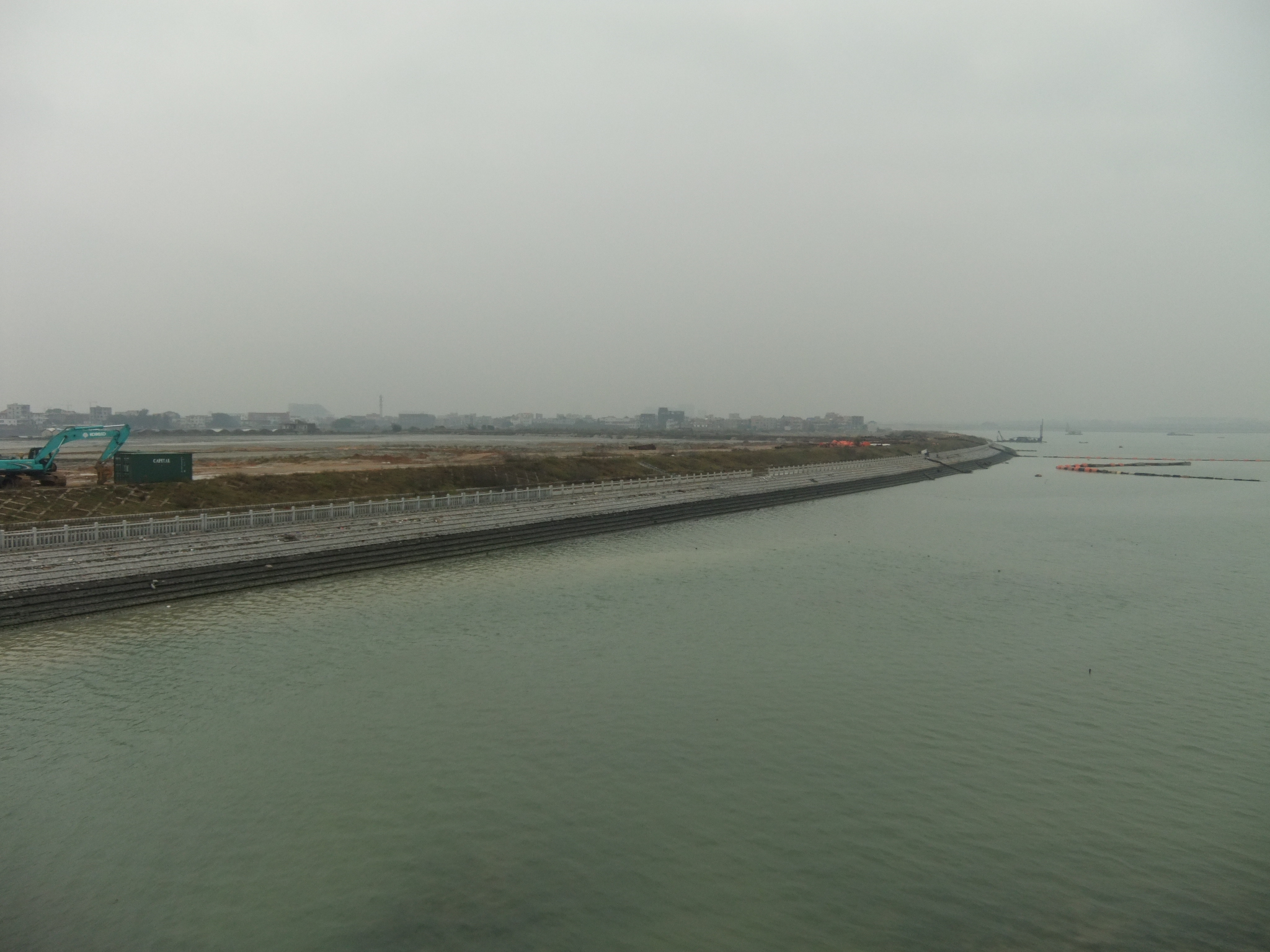
Newly reclaimed land on Bingzhou Island in the Xixi estuary

Xixi (Chinese: 西溪; pinyin: Xixī; Pe̍h-ōe-jī: Sai-khoe; lit. 'Western Stream') is a river in Tong'an District of Xiamen City, in Fujian Province of China. Said to be "Xiamen's largest river", it is 34 kilometres (21 mi) long and has a drainage basin of 494 square kilometres (191 sq mi).

The Xixi starts in the Zhaijianwei Mountains (寨尖尾山 Zhàijiānwěishān) in the northwestern part of Tong'an District, and flows in the general south-eastern direction. After receiving a number of tributaries - Lianhuaxi (莲花溪, Lotus Stream), Aoxi (澳溪), Dingxi (汀溪), it merges with the Dongxi (东溪, Eastern Stream) at the place called Shuangxikou (双溪口, "The confluence of two streams), near Tong'an District's central urban area. It then continues to the south, forming an estuary as it discharges into Dongzui Harbour (东咀港), which is a bay of Taiwan Strait mostly enclosed by Tong'an District and Xiang'an District on the mainland and the Xiamen Island.
