= Dadeng Subdistrict =

Dadeng Subdistrict 大嶝街道 (Chinese) Tateng
- Subdistrict
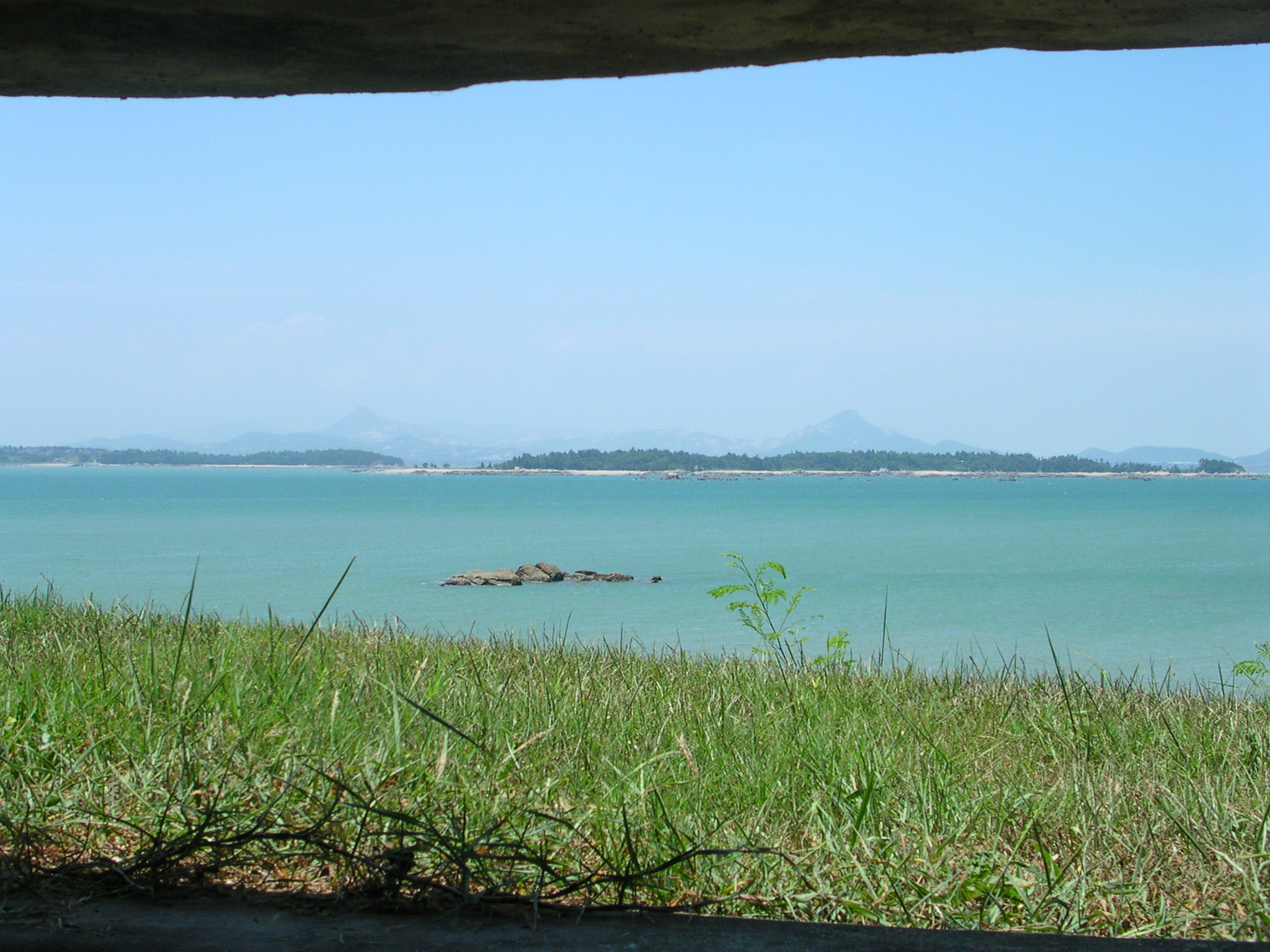
- View of Jiaoyu from Mashan Broadcasting and Observation Station, Jinsha, Kinmen (Quemoy)

- Location in Fujian Dadeng Subdistrict (China)
- Coordinates: 24°34′16″N 118°19′6″E
- Administered by: China
- Claimed by: Republic of China
- PRC Province: Fujian
- Sub-provincial city: Xiamen
- District: Xiang'an
- Village-level divisions: 9 residential communities
- Established: 2005

Area
  - Total: 13.2 km^{2} (5.1 sq mi)

Population (2010)
  - Total: 18,328
  - Density: 1,390/km^{2} (3,600/sq mi)
- Time zone: UTC+8 (China Standard)

Dadeng
Disputed island
- Interactive map of Dadeng

Administration
- China
- PRC Province: Fujian
- Sub-provincial city: Xiamen
- District: Xiang'an

Claimed by
- Republic of China
- ROC Province: Fuchien
- County: Kinmen

Dadeng Subdistrict
- Chinese: 大嶝街道
Transcriptions
Standard Mandarin
- Hanyu Pinyin: Dàdèng Jiēdào
- Wade–Giles: Ta^{4}-têng^{4} Chieh^{1}-tao^{4}

Dadeng Subdistrict (Chinese: 大嶝街道; pinyin: Dàdèng Jiēdào) is a group of three islands under the de facto administration of the People's Republic of China as part of Xiang'an District of Xiamen in southern Fujian, but is also claimed by the Republic of China and historically constituted as an insular subdistrict in Kinmen County (Quemoy).

== History ==
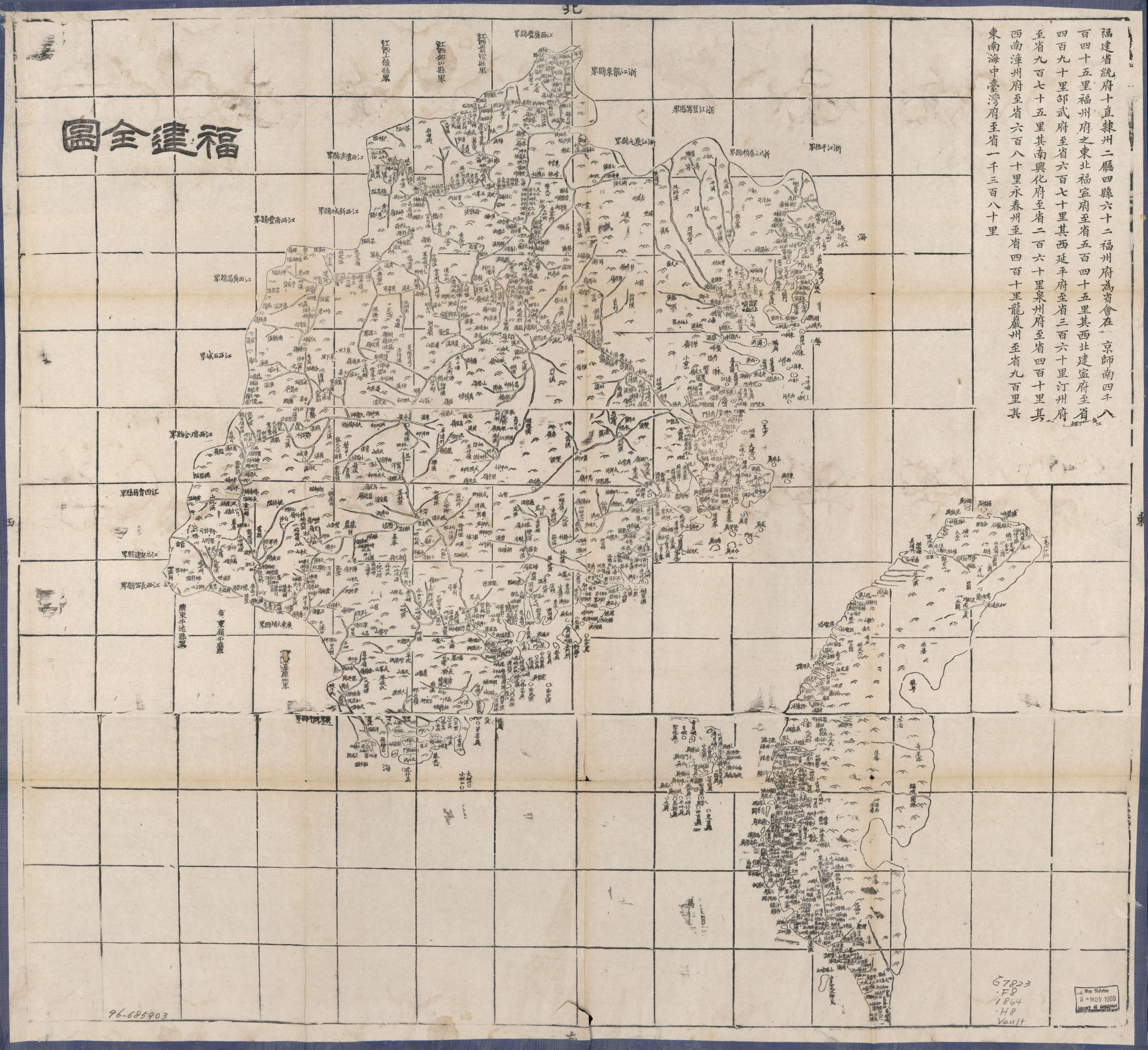
Dadeng and Xiaodeng (labelled as 大嶝㠘 and 小嶝㠘)

From the Song dynasty to the early Republican China period, the area was part of Xiangfeng Li (翔風里).

In 1914, the present-day Dadeng Subdistrict area became part of Xiamen's Siming County.

In 1915, the present-day Dadeng Subdistrict area became part of Kinmen County (Quemoy).

Japan occupied Kinmen County (Quemoy) during the Second Sino-Japanese War from 1937 to 1945. During this period, the county government was moved to Dadeng.

The islands have been under PRC control since October 9 or October 15, 1949 initially as part of Nan'an County. On the day of Qingming Festival in 2005, a monument to the more than 300 PLA soldiers who died during the struggle was erected on Dadeng Island.

In the lead-up to the Battle of Kuningtou in late October 1949, the PLA gathered forces in Aotou (澳頭) (in Xindian, Xiamen), Dadeng (Tateng) and Lianhe (Lienho) (蓮河) (then part of Nan'an County, now also in Xindian).

Dadeng District (大嶝區) was established in 1949.

On September 3, 1954, fourteen 120 mm and 155 mm Chinese Communist artillery in Xiamen (Amoy) and Dadeng (Tateng) fired six thousand rounds at the Kinmen (Quemoy) Islands in a five-hour period. Two Americans of the US Military Assistance Advisory Group, Lieutenant Colonel Alfred Medendorp and Lieutenant Colonel Frank Lynn, were killed in the shelling. On the morning of September 5, three carriers, a cruiser and three destroyers from the United States Seventh Fleet were standing by, patrolling the Taiwan Strait (Formosa Strait) a few miles from Kinmen (Quemoy). On September 7, the Chinese Nationalists responded to the attack with a seventy-six plane air raid on coastal mainland targets, claiming to destroy five of fourteen Chinese Communist artillery pieces, with (ROC) damaged sustained to only three Nationalist planes or (PRC) six Nationalist planes downed and twenty-five damaged. Beijing (Peiping) reported at least sixty deaths as a result of Nationalist bombing. Taipei reported, "great fires at storage points, hundred of junks sunk, and blows at Communist troop concentrations".

In November 1955, a 6,300-foot causeway between Dadeng Island (Tateng Island) and the mainland was under construction by the PRC. On November 28, 1955, Chinese Nationalist 155mm howitzers fired 240 rounds at the causeway. Communist artillery responded with 680 rounds. No major damage was reported.

In the Second Taiwan Strait Crisis in 1958, Dadeng was one of the areas from which PLA forces shelled Kinmen County (Quemoy), Republic of China (Taiwan).

In 1958, Dadeng District became Dadeng Combat Zone Commune (大嶝战地公社). During the Second Taiwan Strait Crisis in 1958, the islands were designated by the State Council of the People's Republic of China as the "Hero's Triangle" (英雄三島).

In January 1971, Dadeng Combat Zone Commune (along with Xiaodeng and Liuhe) became a part of Tong'an County (later Tong'an District).

In 1984, Dadeng Combat Zone Commune became Dadeng Township.

In 1991, Dadeng Township became Dadeng Town.

In October 2002, the government of Dadeng Town was moved from Tianqian Village to Xitian (西田).

At the end of 2002, Dadeng was designated a Taiwan Tourism Trade Zone (对台旅游商贸区).

In 2003, Dadeng Town became a part of Xiang'an District.

In September 2005, Dadeng Town became Dadeng Subdistrict.

In 2019, plans for a building an airport on Dadeng Island by 2020 involved doubling the size of the island.

== Geography ==
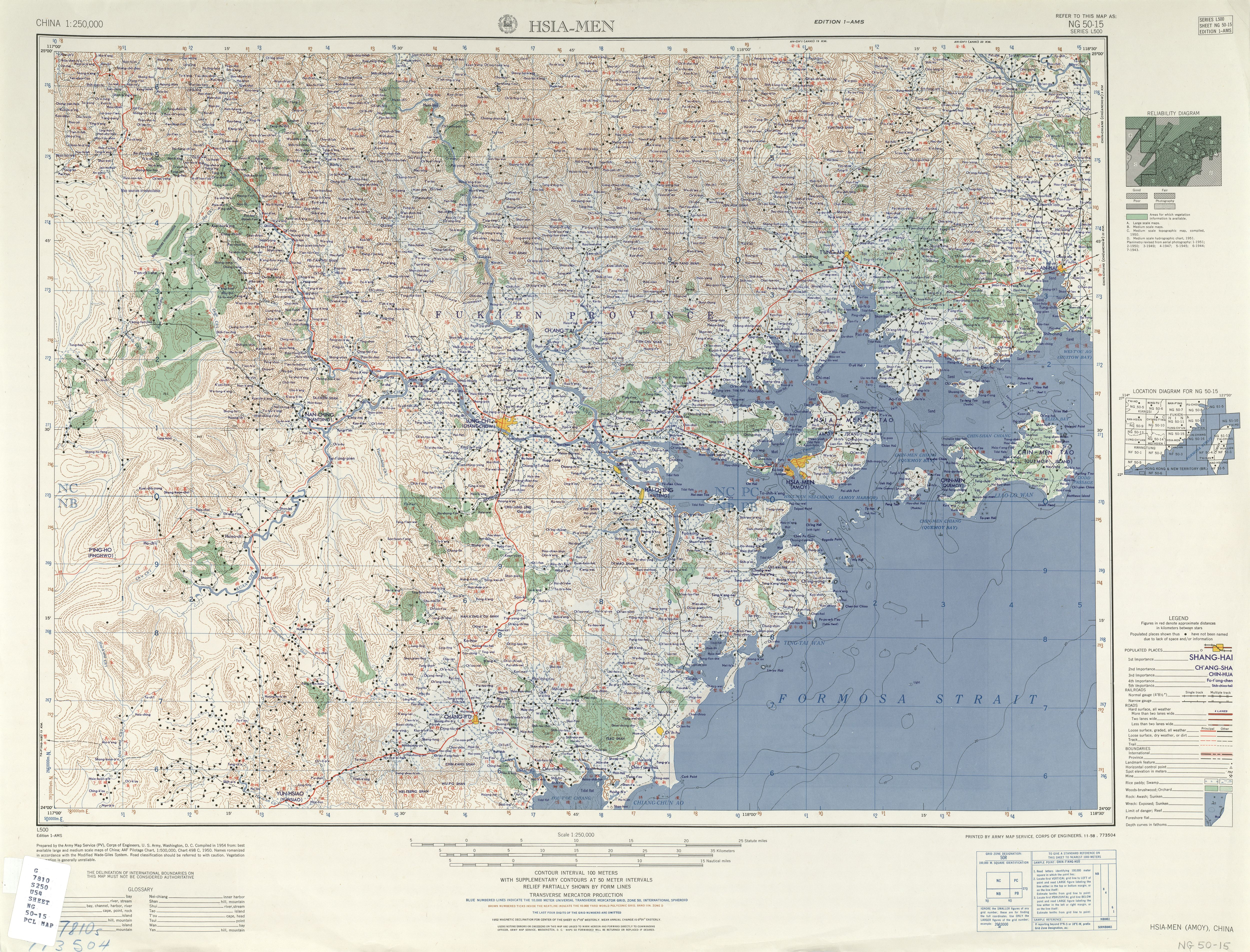
Dadeng (labelled as Ta-teng Tao, Twalin), Xiaodeng (labelled as Hsiao-teng, Town I) and Jiaoyu (labelled as Chiao Hsü, Reef I) (1954)

Dadeng Subdistrict is made up of offshore islands and islets including:

- Dadeng (Tateng, Twalin) (大嶝岛)
- Xiaodeng (Hsiaoteng, Town I., Siao Deng) (小嶝岛)
- Jiaoyu/Jiao Yu (Chiao I., Reef I. 角屿)
- Baihajiao (白蛤礁/白哈礁)

Dadeng (大嶝/大嶝島), Xiaodeng (小嶝/小嶝島) and Jiaoyu (角嶼) were part of Kinmen County in Republican China and are claimed by modern Kinmen County, Republic of China (Taiwan). The islands have been under PRC control since October 9 or October 15, 1949.

At low tide, the coast near Mashan (馬山) in northern Jinsha Township, Kinmen County (Quemoy), ROC (Taiwan) is 1.8 kilometres (1.1 mi) from Jiaoyu. Rock-filled waters make passage between the two areas difficult.

== Administrative divisions ==
Dadeng Subdistrict administers nine residential communities:

- Tianqian (T'ien-ch'ien; 田墘社区), Shantou (山头社区), Xunku (𫊻窟社区; traditional characters: 蟳窟社區), Dengqi (嶝崎社区), Shuanghu (Shuang-hu; 双沪社区), Yangtang (Yang-t'ang; 阳塘社区), Beimen (北门社区), Dongcheng (东埕社区), Xiaodeng (Hsiao-teng; 小嶝社区)

== See also ==
- List of islands of Fujian
- List of township-level divisions of Fujian
- Xiaodeng Island
