= Voice of the Strait =

Chinese radio station

- Type: International public broadcaster
- Country: China
- Availability: International
- Owner: People's Liberation Army Strategic Support Force
- Key people: Zhong Zhigang (钟志刚)
- Launch date: August 24, 1958
- Affiliation(s): Chinese Communist Party
- Official website: www.vos.com.cn

Voice of the Strait (Chinese: 海峡之声), Founded on August 24, 1958. Its predecessor is the PLA Fujian Front Line Broadcasting Station (中国人民解放军福建前线广播电台), established in Yuandang Street No. 15, Gulou District, Fuzhou city, Fujian province, People's Republic of China. is composed of People's Liberation Army opened stations, mainly for the Taiwan radio, broadcast radio the Mandarin and Minnan language dialect program, now has 5 broadcast channels, also set up Chinese classical network radio. The platform is provided with the official website of the network.

The radio's wave power is very large; waves mainly cover Taiwan and East China, Asia, Europe, Africa, Oceania and America, and even the Arctic and Antarctic can also receive shortwave broadcasts belonging to the international radio. While the Mediumwave of power is very small, in the daytime distance near the launch site, almost can not receive.

The interval signal is a bell rendition of "Three Rules of Discipline and Eight Points for Attention".

In 2015, the unit which operates Voice of the Strait was transferred from the People's Liberation Army General Political Department to the People's Liberation Army Strategic Support Force becoming PLASSF Base 311. Base 311 (also known as PLA Unit 61716) is primarily responsible for psychological warfare operations against Taiwan.

== Frequency ==
- News Radio: MW 666 kHz, SW 4940 kHz
- Minnan Radio: MW 783 kHz, SW 6115 kHz
- General Radio: FM 97.9 MHz
- Car & Life Radio: FM 90.6 MHz
- Sunshine FM: FM 99.6 MHz

== See also ==
- Cross-Strait propaganda
  - Voice of Han
  - Fu Hsing Broadcasting Station
- China National Radio
- Radio Taiwan International
