= Xiang'an, Xiamen =

Xiang'an 翔安区
- District
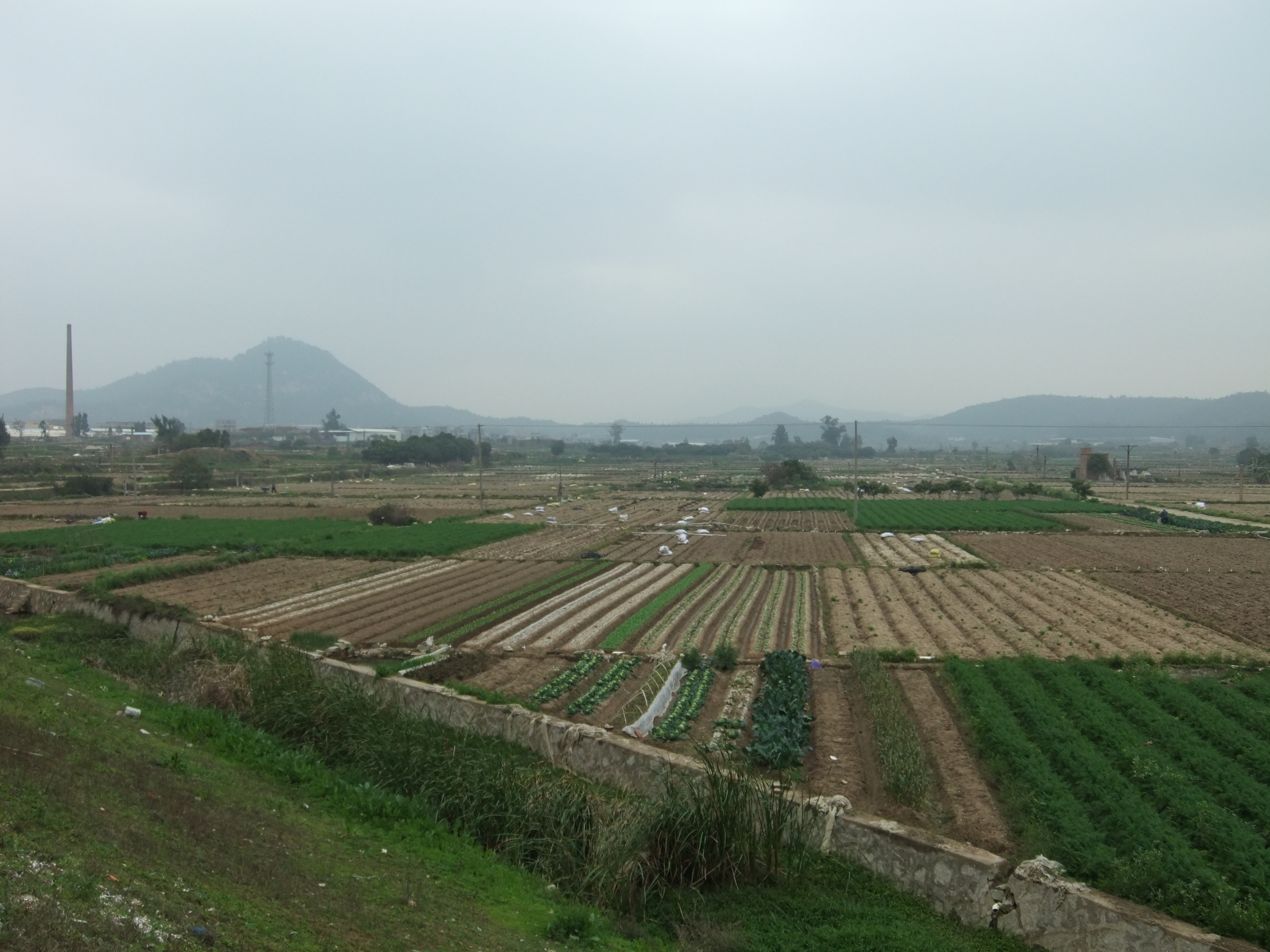
- Rural landscape in Xiang'an District

- Location in Fujian
- Coordinates: 24°37′07″N 118°14′53″E
- Country: People's Republic of China
- Province: Fujian
- Sub-provincial city: Xiamen
- Seat: Dadeng Subdistrict (大嶝街道)

Area
  - Total: 352 km^{2} (136 sq mi)

Population (2020)
  - Total: 578,255
  - Density: 1,640/km^{2} (4,250/sq mi)
- Time zone: UTC+8 (China Standard)
- Postal code: 361101
- Area code: 0592
- Website: web.archive.org/web/20120606051430/http://www.xiangan.gov.cn:80/

Xiang'an (Note: Chinese: 翔安区; pinyin: Xiáng'ān Qū; Pe̍h-ōe-jī: Siông-an-khu;) is one of the districts of Xiamen, People's Republic of China. It is located on the mainland, and is Xiamen's easternmost district.

== Geography ==
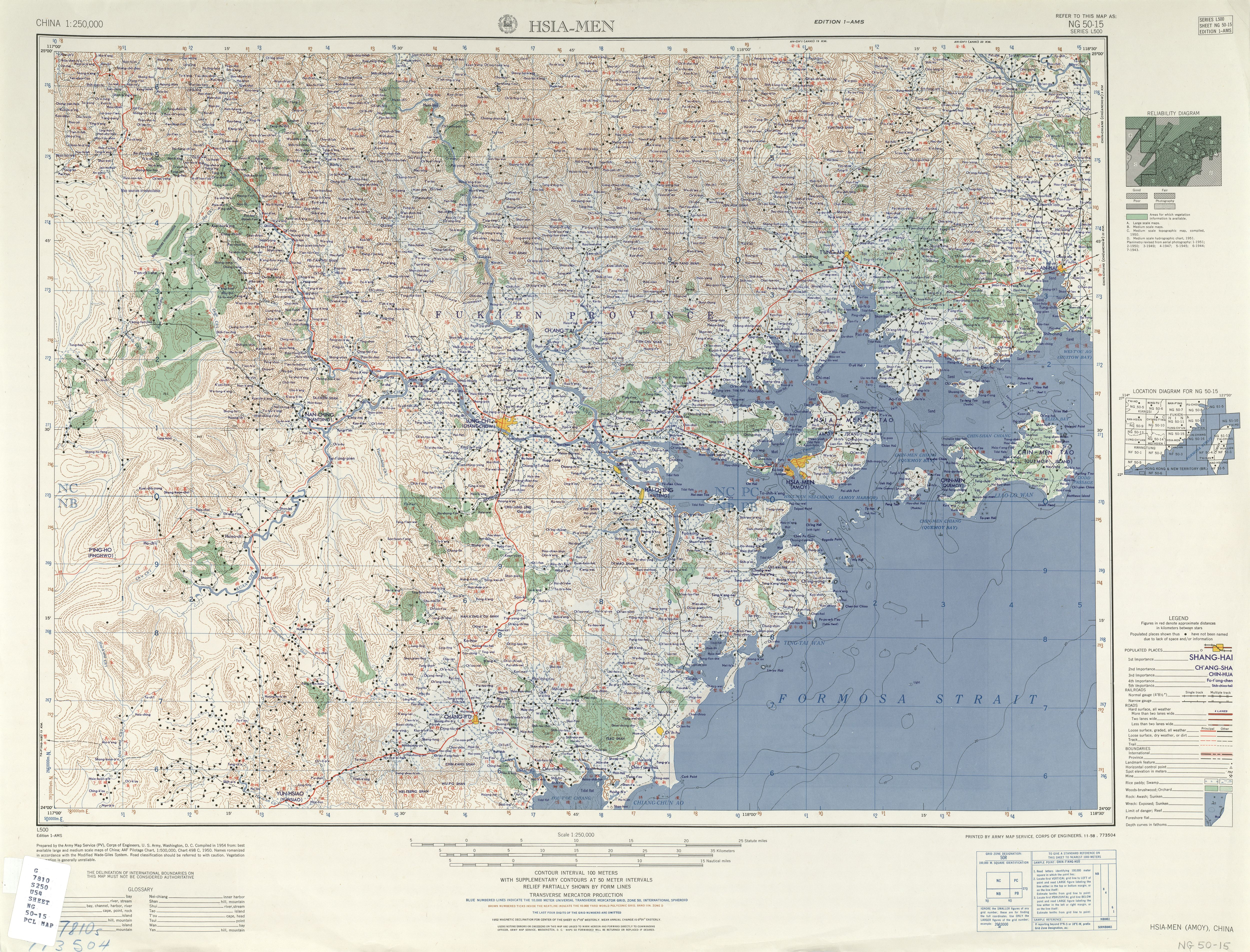
Map including the area of modern Xiang'an District (1954)

Dadeng Subdistrict of Xiang'an District is made up of offshore islands and islets including:

- Dadeng (Tateng) (大嶝岛)
- Xiaodeng (小嶝岛)
- Jiaoyu (角屿)
- Baihajiao (白蛤礁/白哈礁)

Dadeng (大嶝/大嶝島), Xiaodeng (小嶝/小嶝島) and Jiaoyu (角嶼) were part of Kinmen County in Republican China and are claimed by modern Kinmen County, Republic of China (Taiwan). The islands have been under PRC control since October 9 or October 15, 1949.

== Administrative divisions ==
Xiang'an District administers one subdistrict, four towns and one other area:

- Dadeng Subdistrict (大嶝街道, formerly 大嶝镇)
- Xindian (新店镇)
- Xinxu (新圩镇)
- Maxiang (马巷镇)
- Neicuo (内厝镇)
- Damaoshan Farm (大帽山农场)

The district was created out of five towns (鎮) of Tong'an District in October 19, 2003. Since then Dadeng Town has been renamed Dadeng Subdistrict (大嶝街道) and made the district seat.

== Transport ==
The Xiamen Xiang'an Tunnel is located in the district. The tunnel is about 9 km (5.6 mi) long, including 5.95 kilometres (3.70 mi) of road under water. It starts from Wutong of Xiamen Island and terminates at Xibin, Xiang'an District, Xiamen. It was completed in November 2009 and was at the time the first tunnel of its kind on the mainland.

== Healthcare ==
The Healthcare industry started rapidly adopting AI technology applications in 2017 and at the beginning of 2018 the People's Government of Xiang'an, Xiamen announced plans to build China's first healthcare industry centre in Xiamen. To achieve this it partnered with leading technology firms Deloitte and the Cogobuy Group.

Cogobuy Group's subsidiary IngDan (硬蛋) had over 1,000 healthcare innovation projects at the time with many planned for integration into the new healthcare centre. The integration plan involved the projects gradually being introduced into the city's new healthcare centre and focused on promoting healthcare projects, establishing healthcare industry investment funds, as well as the build out of a new healthcare medical data platform.

== Education ==
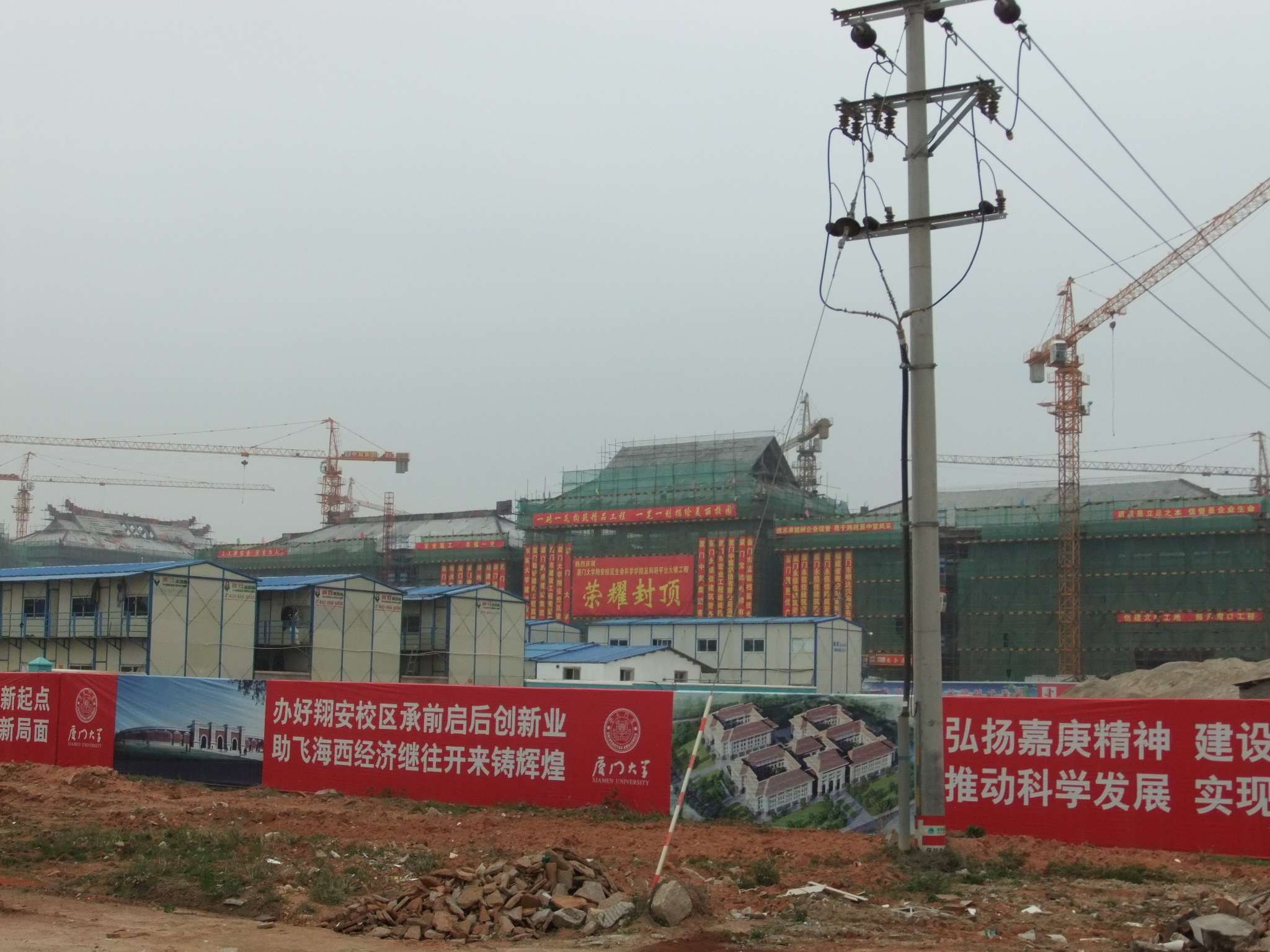
Construction in progress on the future Xiang'an Campus of Xiamen University

Xiang'an district is the location of the new campus of Xiamen University.

Completed in 2013, the 243 hectare campus makes the university the second largest in China by student numbers and area - with regular shuttle buses to the historic Siming Campus in the city centre 33 kilometres (21 mi) away.

It is predicted to accommodate up to 30,000 students. The campus has an automobile-free policy; most journeys by students and faculty are made on bicycles.
