= Mashan Broadcasting and Observation Station =

Former broadcasting and observation station in Jinsha, Kinmen, Taiwan

- 馬山觀測站
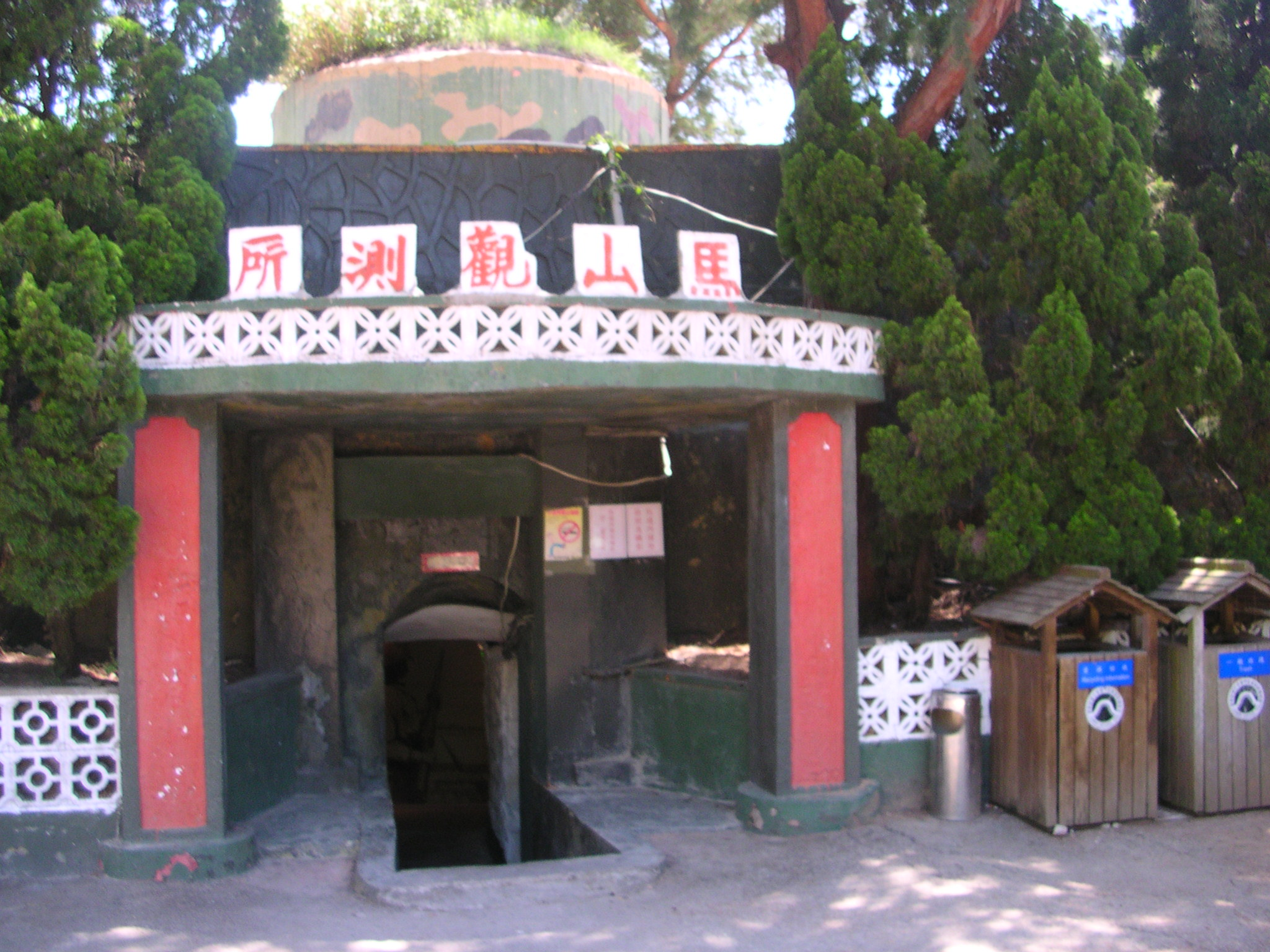
- Entrance of Mashan Observation Post

- Location within Taiwan

General information
- Type: former broadcasting and observation tower
- Location: Jinsha, Kinmen, Taiwan
- Coordinates: 24°31′35.9″N 118°24′35.8″E

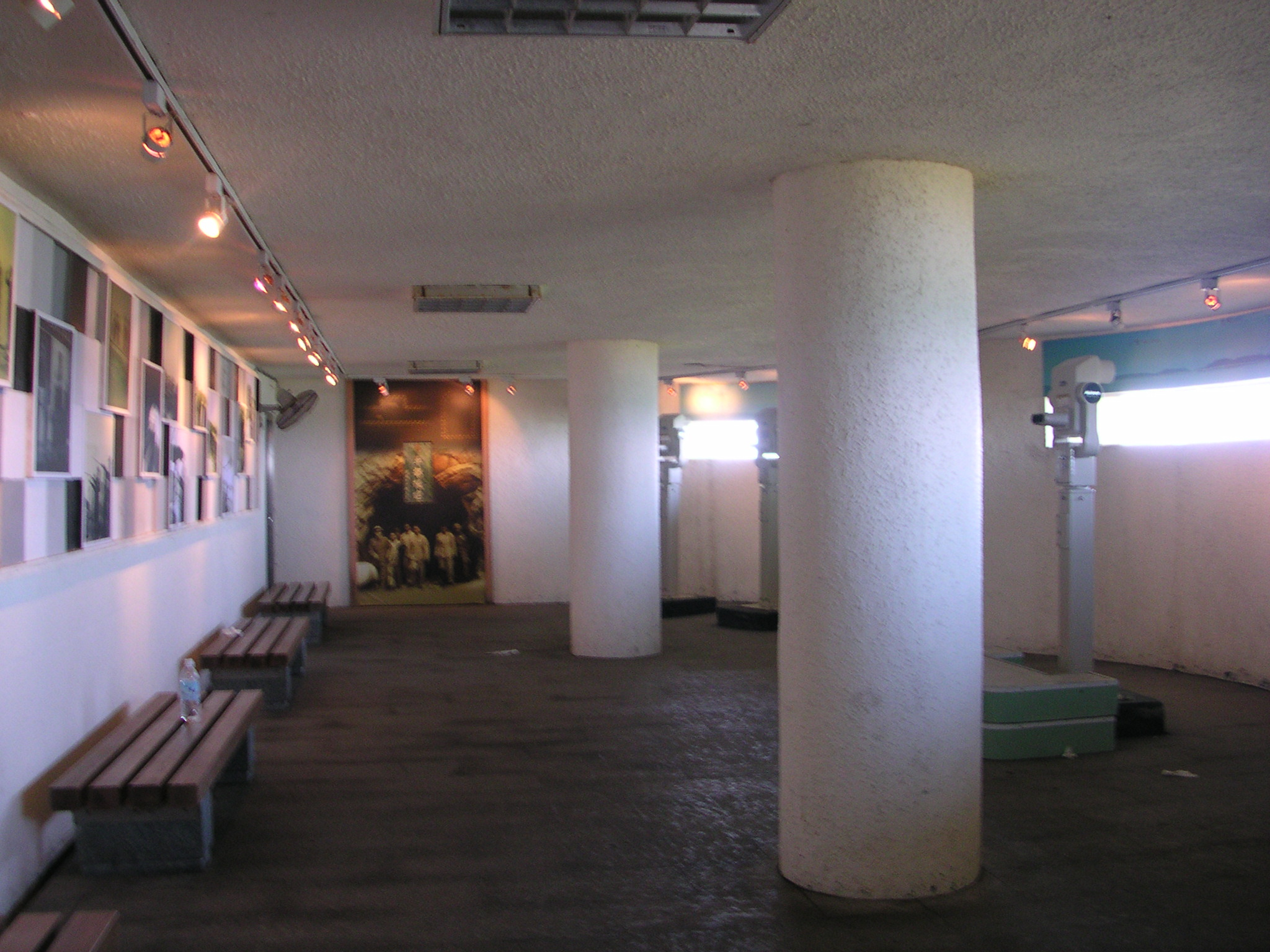
Mashan Broadcasting and Observation Station viewing deck

The Mashan Broadcasting and Observation Station (traditional Chinese: 馬山觀測站; simplified Chinese: 马山观测站; pinyin: Mǎshān Guāncèzhàn) is a historical broadcasting station and observation tower in Jinsha Township, Kinmen County, Taiwan.

== History ==
The station used to send out propaganda message to the People's Liberation Army soldiers in Mainland China to surrender and join the Republic of China Armed Forces.

== Features ==
Xiamen can be observed from the station which is located 1,800 meters away during low tide and 2,100 meters during high tide.

== See also ==
- List of tourist attractions in Taiwan
- Beishan Broadcasting Wall
- Dadeng Subdistrict
