= Xindian, Xiamen =

Xindian 新店镇 Hsin-tien
- Town
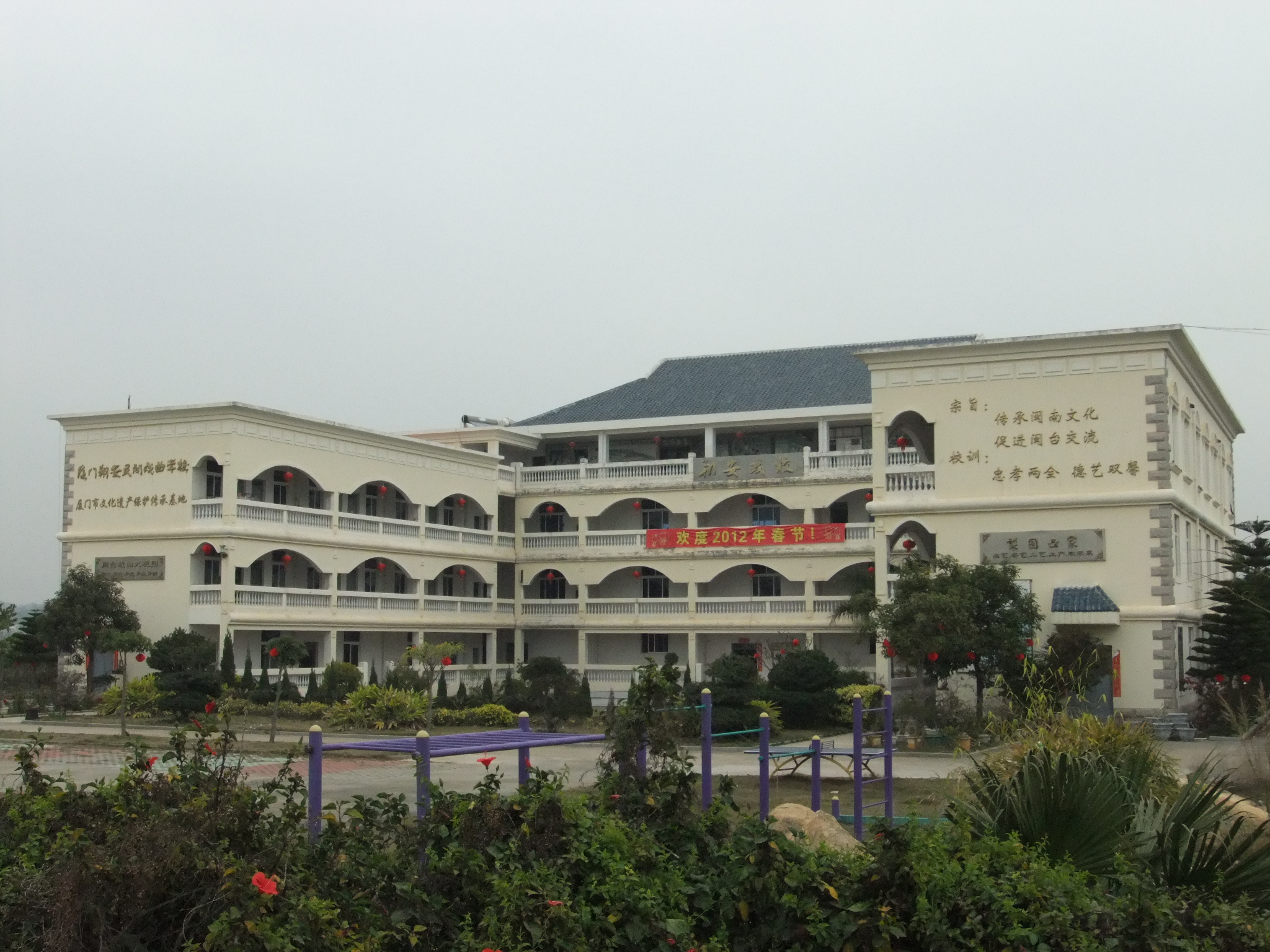
- A school in Lütang

- Location in Fujian Xindian (China)
- Coordinates: 24°36′36″N 118°14′26″E
- Country: People's Republic of China
- Province: Fujian
- Sub-provincial city: Xiamen
- District: Xiang'an
- Village-level divisions: 41 residential communities

Area
  - Total: 135 km^{2} (52 sq mi)

Population (2010)
  - Total: 92,770
  - Density: 687/km^{2} (1,780/sq mi)
- Time zone: UTC+8 (China Standard)

Xindian, Xiamen
- Simplified Chinese: 新店镇
- Traditional Chinese: 新店鎮
Transcriptions
Standard Mandarin
- Hanyu Pinyin: Xīndiàn Zhèn
- Wade–Giles: Hsin¹-tien⁴ Chên⁴

Xindian (simplified Chinese: 新店镇; traditional Chinese: 新店鎮; pinyin: Xīndiàn Zhèn; Pe̍h-ōe-jī: Sin-tiàm-tìn) is a town in Xiang'an District, Xiamen, Fujian, China.

== History ==
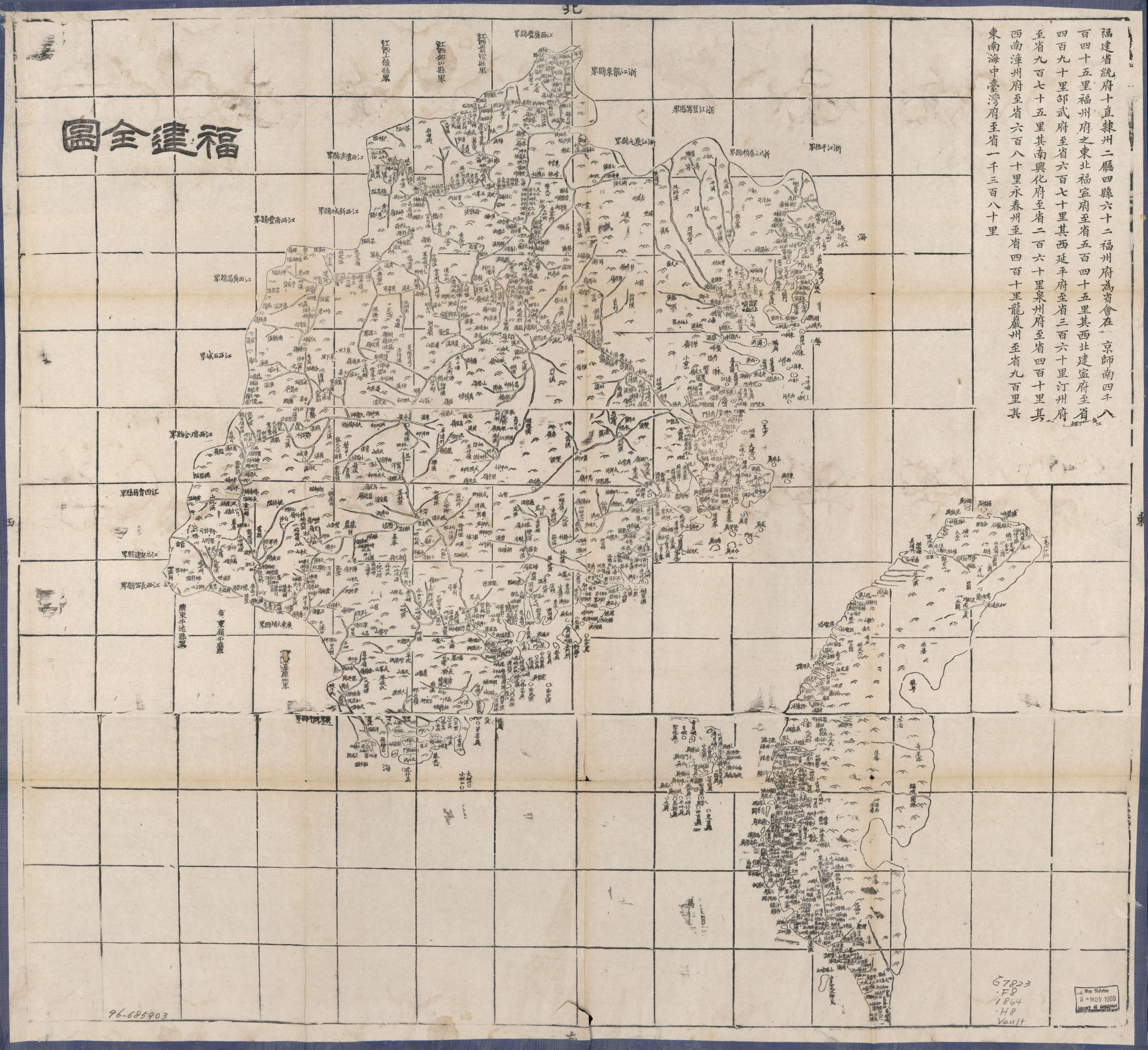
Liuwudian (written as 劉五店司)

In the lead up to the Battle of Kuningtou in 1949, PLA forces massed at Aotou (Ao-t'ou; 澳頭), Dadeng (Tateng) and Lianhe (Lienho; 蓮河) (then part of Nan'an County).

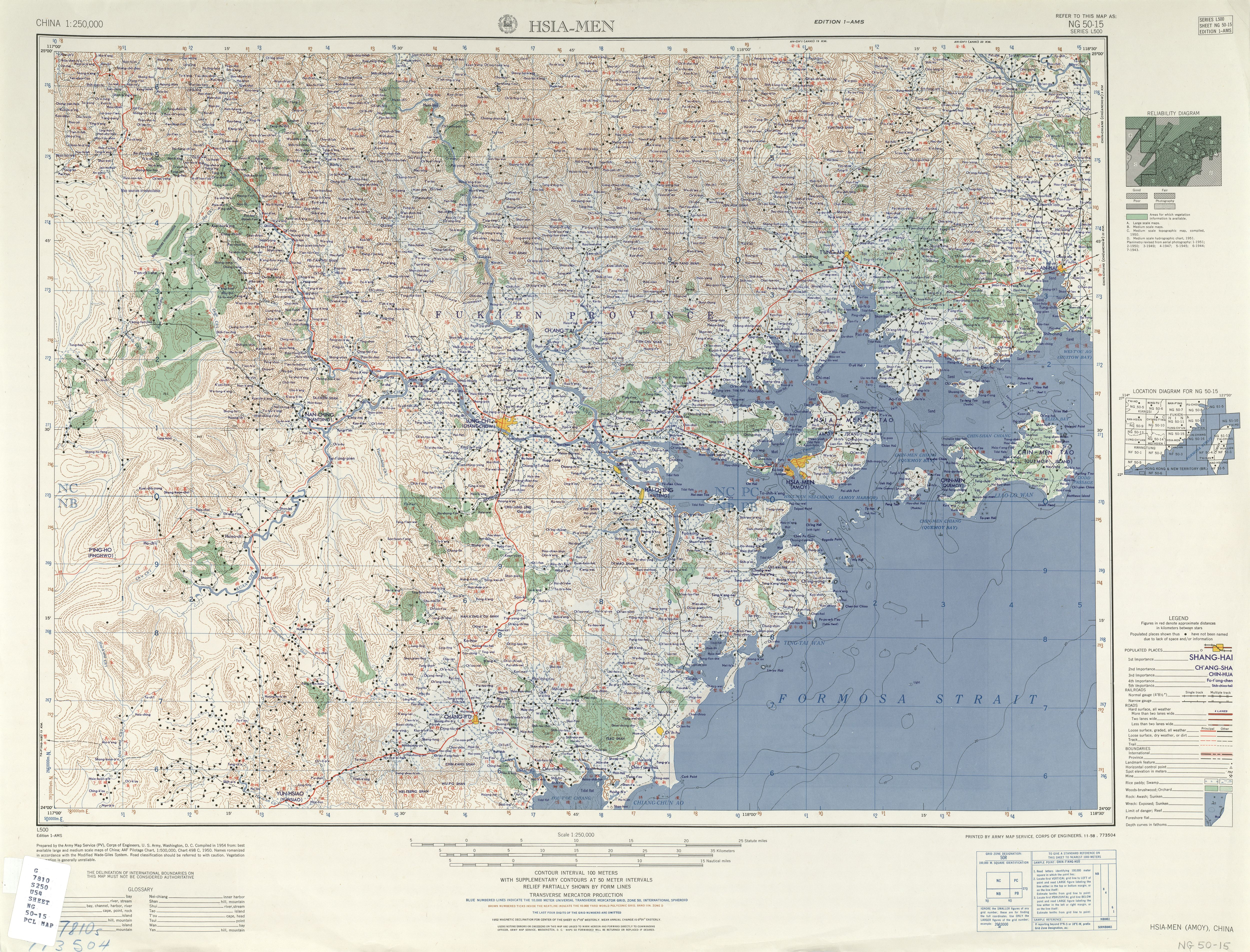
Xindian (labelled as Hsin-tien 新店) (1954)

In the Second Taiwan Strait Crisis in 1958, Lianhe was one of the areas from which PLA forces shelled Kinmen County, Republic of China (Taiwan).

In 1959, Xindian Commune (新店公社) was established.

In January 1971, Dadeng, Xiaodeng and Liuhe were transferred from Nan'an to Tong'an County.

In 1984, Xindian Commune became Xindian Township (新店乡).

In 1987, Xindian Township became Xindian Town.

== Geography ==
The island of Eyu Yu (O-yü Hsü, 鳄鱼屿 'alligator islet') is located to the west of Xindian.

== Administrative divisions ==
Xindian administers forty-one residential communities: Xinxing (新兴社区), Xindian (新店社区), Lianhe (Lien-ho, Lienho; 莲河社区), Xiawu (Hsia-wu; 霞浯社区), Xiaolong (Hsiao-lung; 霄垄社区), Hengcuo (Heng-ts'o; 珩厝社区), Maolin (茂林社区), Dazhai (大宅社区), Lütang (Lü-tang; 吕塘社区), Xiwei (溪尾社区), Xiangwu (祥吴社区), Hutou (湖头社区), Dongkeng (东坑社区), Hongqian (洪前社区), Hongcuo (洪厝社区), Luqian (Lu-ch'ien; 炉前社区), Xiahoubin (下后滨社区), Liuwudian (Liu-wu-tien, Liuwutien; 刘五店社区), Puyuan (P'u-yüan; 浦园社区), Xibin (西滨社区), Aotou (Ao-t'ou; 澳头社区), Oucuo (Ou-ts'o; 欧厝社区), Pengcuo (P'eng-ts'o; 彭厝社区), Qianwu (Ch'ien-wu; 前浯社区), Houcun (后村社区), Caicuo (Ts'ai-ts'o; 蔡厝社区), Chentang (陈塘社区), Dongyuan (Tung-yüan; 东园社区), Shamei (沙美社区), Xiaxu (下许社区), Anshan (垵山社区), Dongjie (东界社区), Zhongzhai (钟宅社区), Pubian (P'u-pien; 浦边社区), Guluo (鼓锣社区), Puxi (浦西社区), Dongxing (东兴社区), Honglinhu (洪琳湖社区), Zengban (曾坂社区), Xiangmei (祥美社区), Guyan (鼓岩社区)

== See also ==
- List of township-level divisions of Fujian
