= Beishan Broadcasting Wall =

Loudspeaker in Jinning, Kinmen, Taiwan

- 北山播音牆
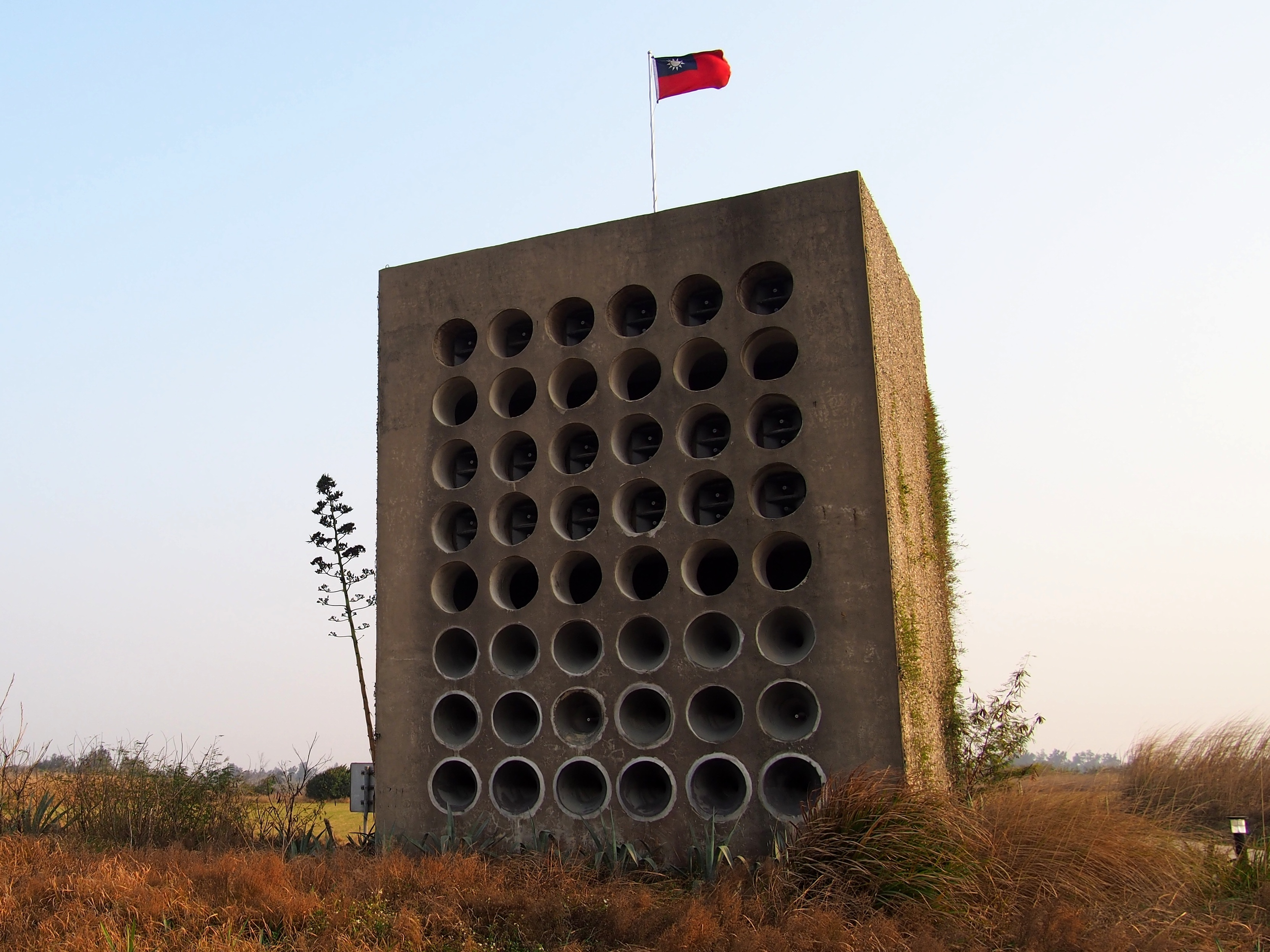
- Interactive map of the Beishan Broadcasting Wall area

General information
- Type: loudspeaker
- Location: Jinning Township, Kinmen, Republic of China
- Coordinates: 24°29′19.9″N 118°18′47.1″E
- Completed: 1967

The Beishan Broadcasting Wall (traditional Chinese: 北山播音牆; simplified Chinese: 北山播音墙; pinyin: Běishān Bòyīn Qiáng; Pe̍h-ōe-jī: Pak-soaⁿ Pò-im-chhiûⁿ) is a propaganda loudspeaker in Jinning Township, Kinmen, Republic of China.

== History ==
The structure was built in 1967 as a psychological Cross-Strait warfare instrument directed towards Mainland China. Material such as songs by Taiwanese singer Teresa Teng and speeches inviting enemy soldiers to defect were played through the loudspeakers. Retaliatory speakers also broadcast messages from the other side of the Strait. It was used until the late 1970s.

== Architecture ==
The stone structure consists of 48 speakers which face the ocean. It stands at a height of around 3-story building.

== See also ==
- Mashan Broadcasting and Observation Station
