= Tong Zhe =

Chinese founder of One-Man University

Tong Zhe 童哲
- Born: May 8, 1987 (age 39); Xiamen, Fujian, China
- Education: Peking University; École Normale Supérieure
- Known for: One-Man University
- Scientific career
- Fields: Theoretical physics Online education

Tong Zhe (Chinese: 童哲, born 8 May 1987) is a Chinese educator known as the founder of One-Man University, an online learning platform with over 140,000 enrolled students as of 2015.

== Degree disputes ==
There have been disputes about Tong's misleading advertising about his degrees. Tong has used ambiguous words such as "undergraduate study at PKU, master's study at ENS" ("北大本，高师硕") to mislead his audience to believe that he had gained a B.S. degree at Peking University and a master's degree at ENS Paris. Forced by the large waves of criticism about this conduct, Tong then posted a blog to clarify his degree situation.
