= Chengdu Tianfu International Airport =

Airport serving Chengdu, Sichuan, China

Chengdu Tianfu International Airport 成都天府国际机场

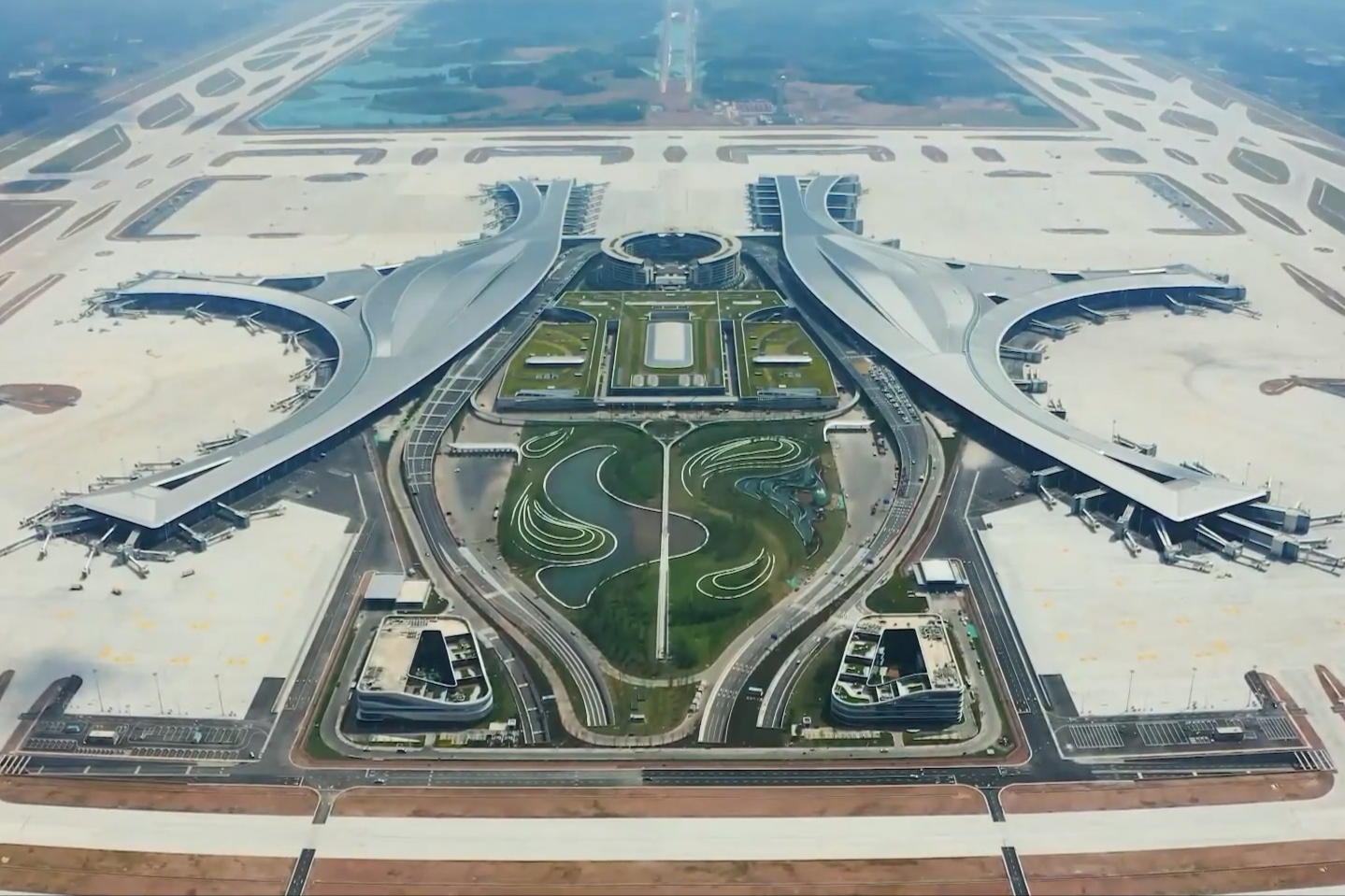
- Aerial view of the airport in 2021
- IATA: TFU; ICAO: ZUTF

Summary
- Airport type: Public
- Owner/Operator: Sichuan Provincial Airport Group
- Serves: Chengdu
- Location: Lujia Town, Jianyang, Sichuan, China
- Opened: 27 June 2021; 5 years ago
- Hub for: Air China; Chengdu Airlines; China Eastern Airlines; Sichuan Airlines
- Focus city for: China Southern Airlines; Lucky Air
- Elevation AMSL: 440 m (1,440 ft)
- Coordinates: 30.319°N 104.445°E
- Website: sctfia.com

Maps
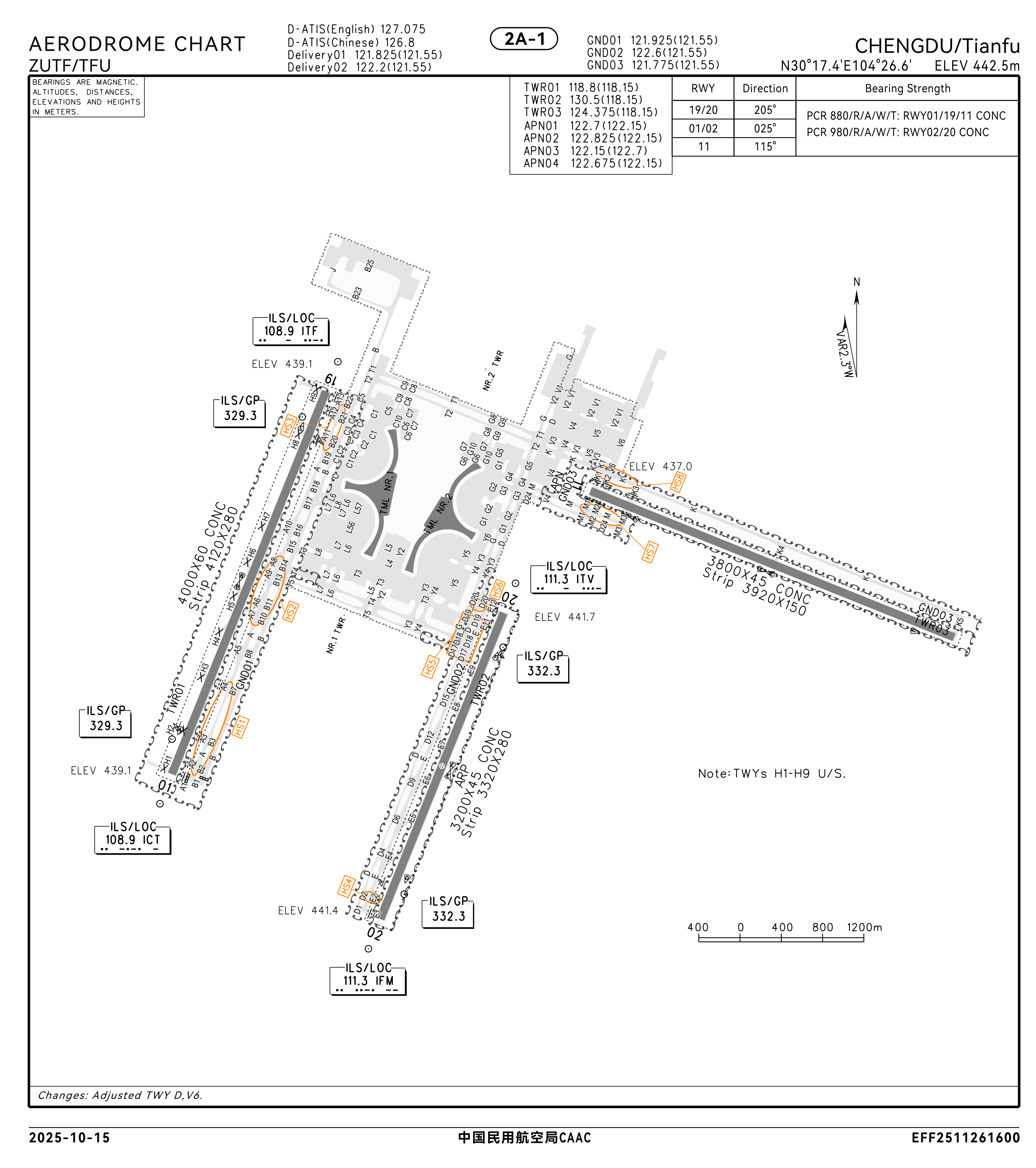
- CAAC airport chart

- Location in Sichuan Location in China

Runways
Direction	Length		Surface
Direction	m	ft	Surface
01/19	4,000	13,123	Concrete
02/20	3,200	10,499	Concrete
11/29 (Note: Used for take-offs in one direction only)	3,800	12,467	Concrete

Statistics (2025)
- Passengers: 56,686,738 ▲3.2%
- Aircraft movements: 383,547 ▲1.3%
- Cargo (Metric tonnes): 434,634.7 ▲12.9%
- Source:, List of the busiest airports in China

Chengdu Tianfu International Airport
- Simplified Chinese: 成都天府国际机场
- Traditional Chinese: 成都天府國際機場
Transcriptions
Standard Mandarin
- Hanyu Pinyin: Chéngdū Tiānfǔ Guójì Jīchǎng
- Wade–Giles: Chʻeng-tu Tʻien-fu Kuo-chi Chi-chʻang

Chengdu Tianfu International Airport (IATA: TFU, ICAO: ZUTF; also known as Tianfu Airport) is one of two international airports serving Chengdu, the capital of Sichuan province in Southwestern China. It was planned in 2013 and opened in 2021, after Chengdu Shuangliu Airport had been exceeding its designed maximum passenger capacity for years.

The airport is located at Lujia Town of Jianyang, 51 km (32 mi) southeast of downtown Chengdu. The construction of this airport began in May 2016, and the airport opened in June 2021. Chengdu is the third city in China to have dual international airports after Beijing and Shanghai.

In 2023, Chengdu Tianfu International Airport and Chengdu Shuangliu International Airport together handled a total of 538,000 flight takeoffs and landings, with a passenger volume of 74.924 million. The annual passenger volume makes Chengdu 3rd among the cities with airport systems in China. Chengdu Tianfu International Airport alone ranks 29th-busiest in the world and the fifth-busiest in China by passenger traffic (44,786,101 passengers in 2023).

== History ==
Plans for a new airport for Chengdu had been in place since 2007. In May 2011, officials confirmed the planning process for selecting a location had started. In June 2013, the Civil Aviation Administration of China officially confirmed and approved Jianyang's Lujia Town as the location for the new airport.

In January 2015, the State Council and Central Military Commission approved the new airport project, and the official name Chengdu Tianfu International Airport (Chinese: 成都天府国际机场) was finalized by the Civil Aviation Administration of China in September 2015. In January 2021, flight testing was done and on 27 June 2021, the first commercial flight departed from the airport. On the same day, Terminal 2 officially entered service.

Terminal 2 serves domestic flights while Terminal 1 serves mostly international flights, though it also serves some domestic flights. The domestic section of Terminal 1 is connected to Terminal 2 via an Innovia automated people mover (APM) for transferring passengers arriving on international flights with domestic connections.

== Design ==
The airport is intended to become the third-largest airport hub in China, after Beijing and Shanghai. The airport opened with three runways (two north–south and one east–west) with two terminals with a capacity of 60 million passengers per year by 2025 and a cargo capacity of 24.45 thousand tonnes.

The full plan includes six runways and four terminals with the capacity to handle 90 million passengers per year. On 1 June 2015, the Sichuan Provincial Airport Group announced a general design scheme for the airport. The winning design was by China Southwest Architectural Design and Research Institute, China Airport Construction Group Corporation, and French architectural firm ADP Ingenierie.

The airport features two terminal buildings in the shape of the mythical Sunbird, used as a logo for the city of Chengdu. From a central hollow circular core, six arms radiate outwards with both terminals mirroring the other.

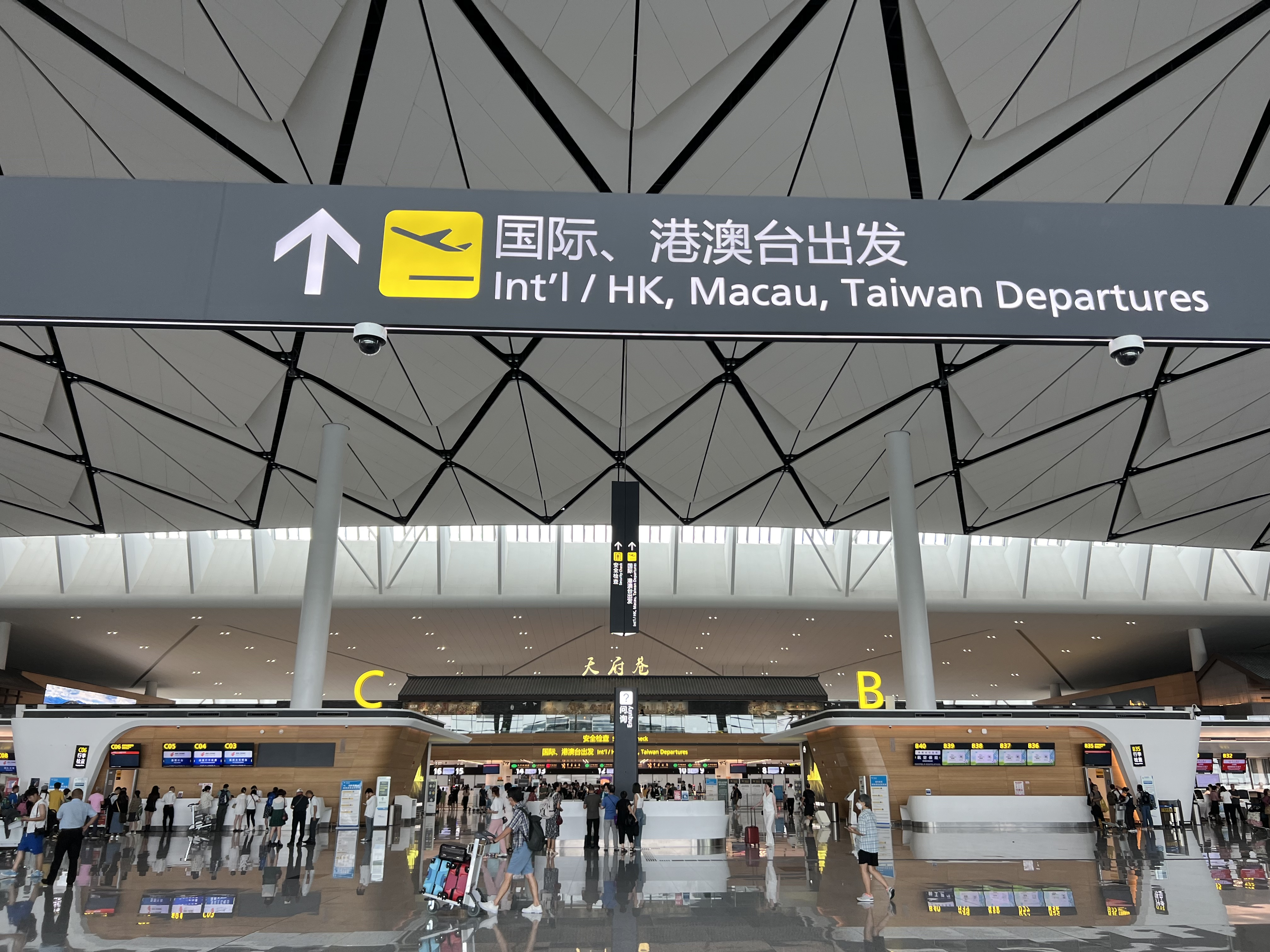
Terminal 1 (int'l departures)

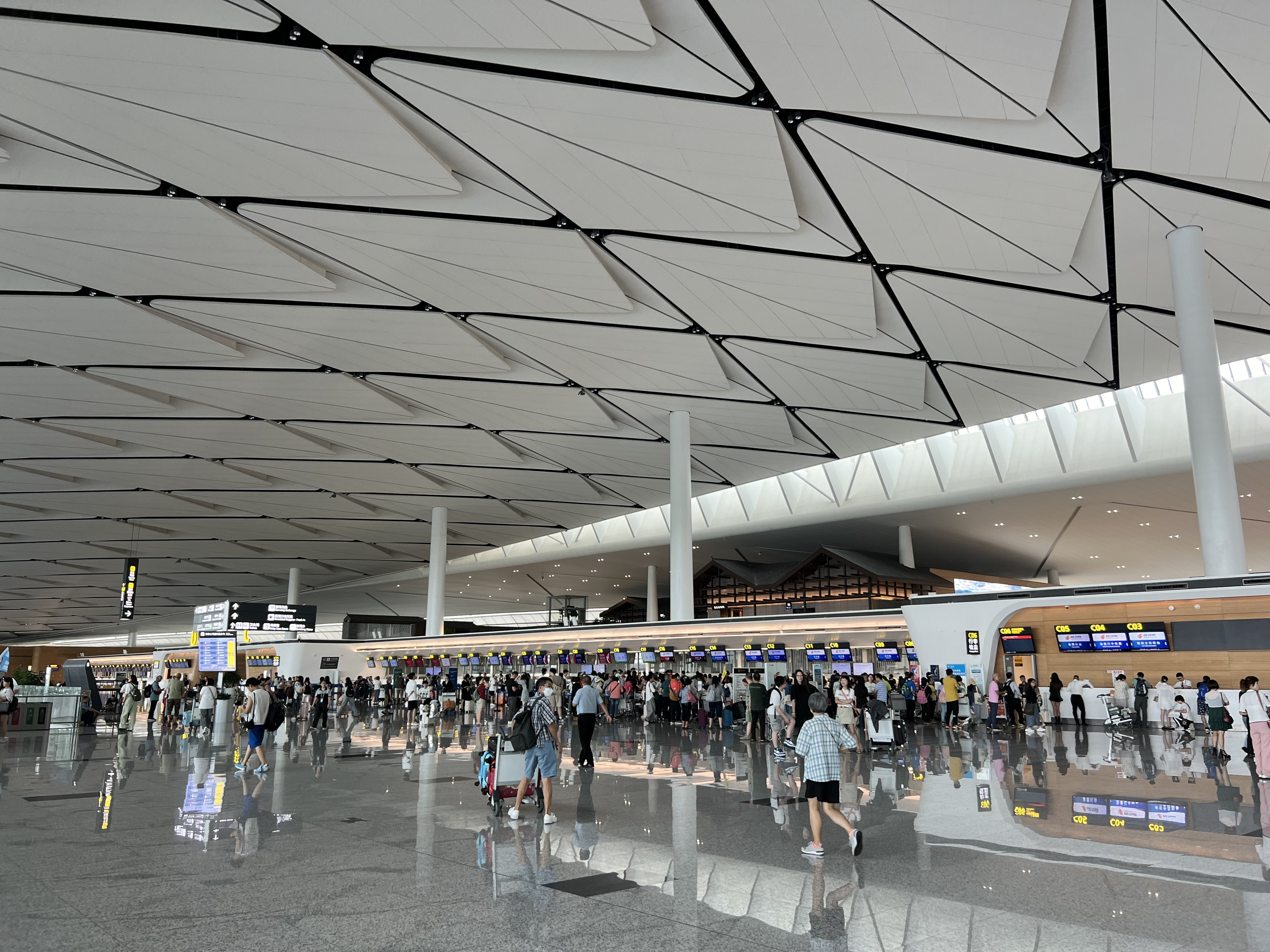
Terminal 1 landside

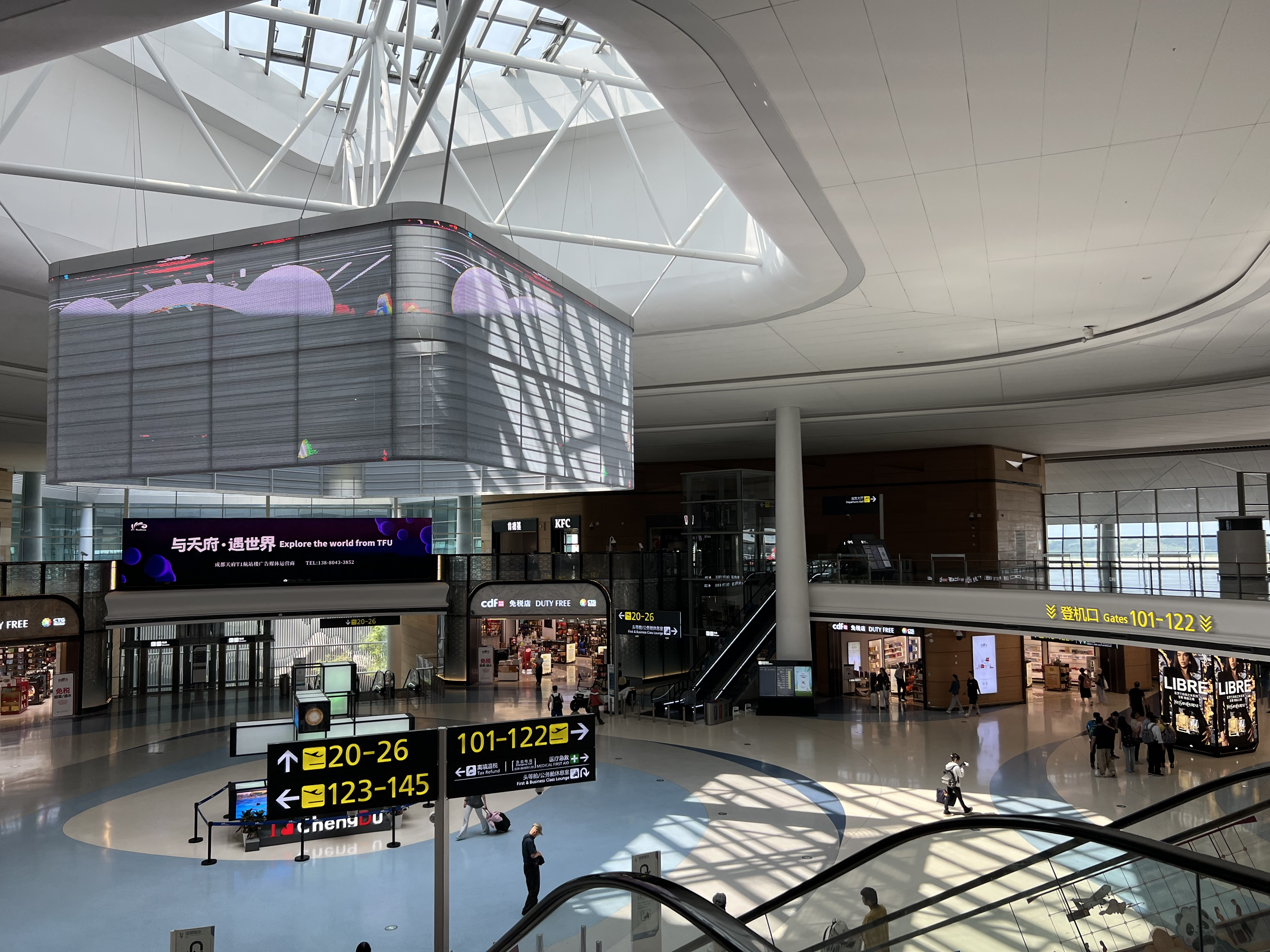
T1 Main Concourse

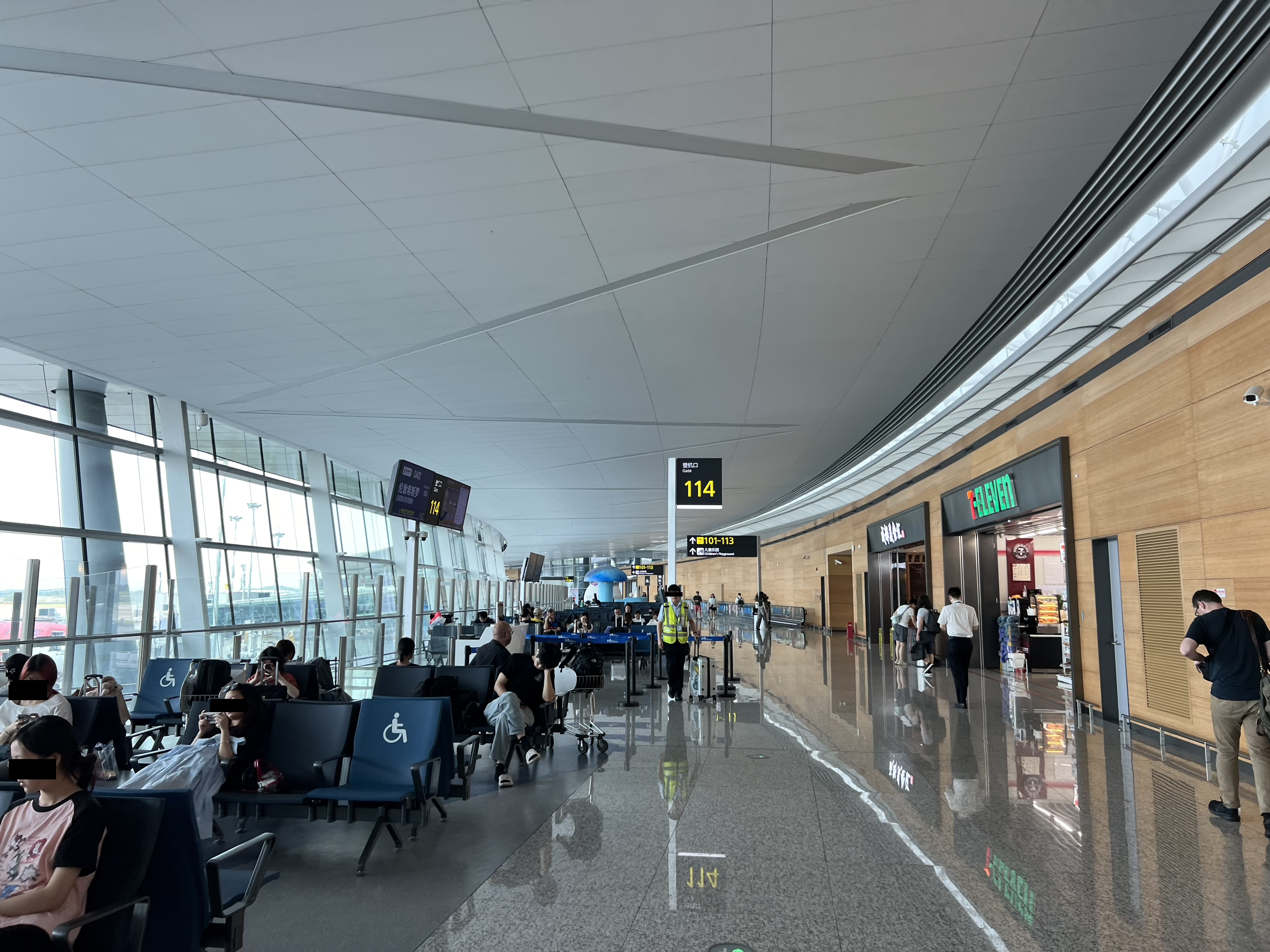
Airside of Terminal 1

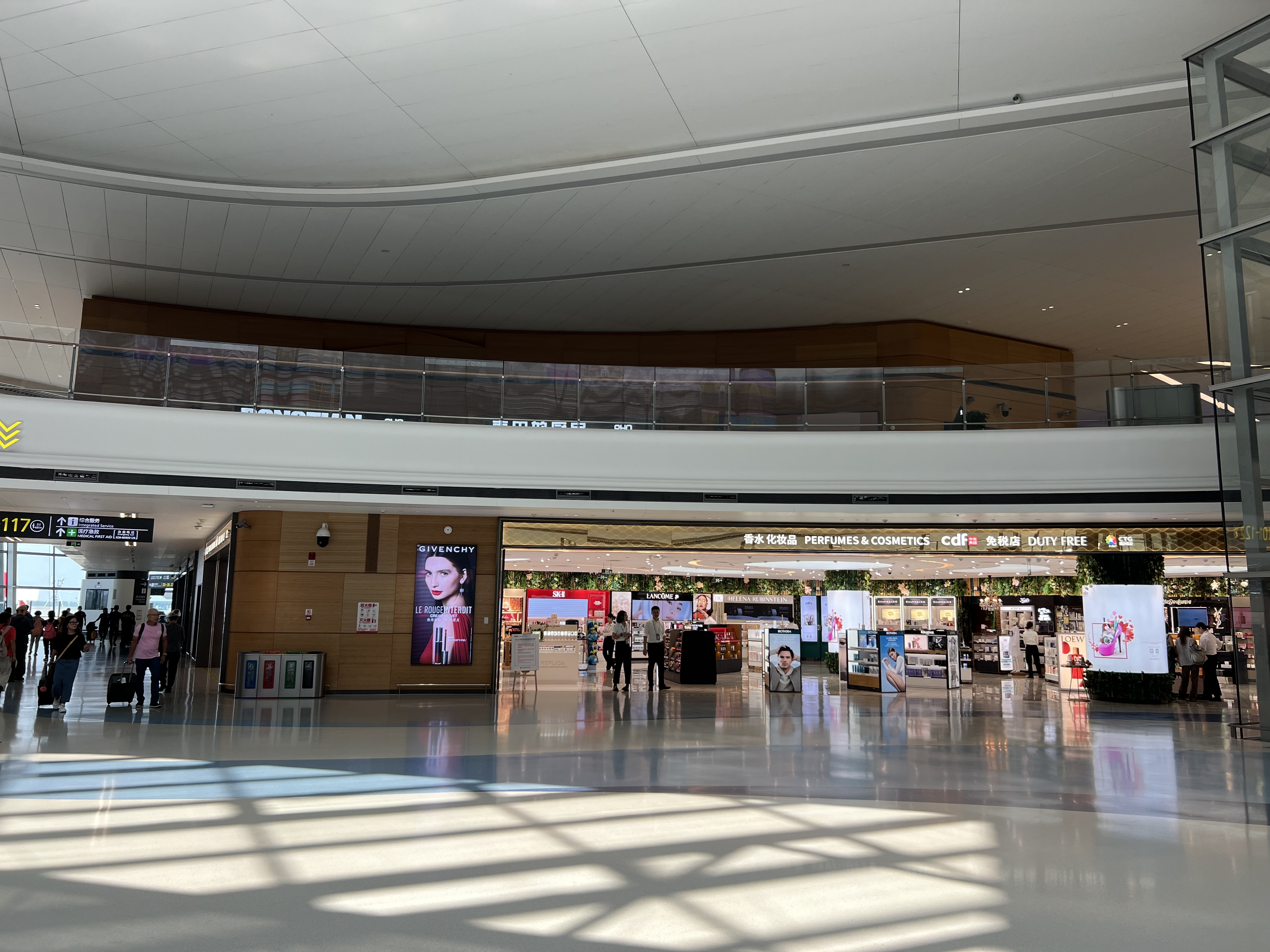
Terminal 1 Int‘l Departure Concourse

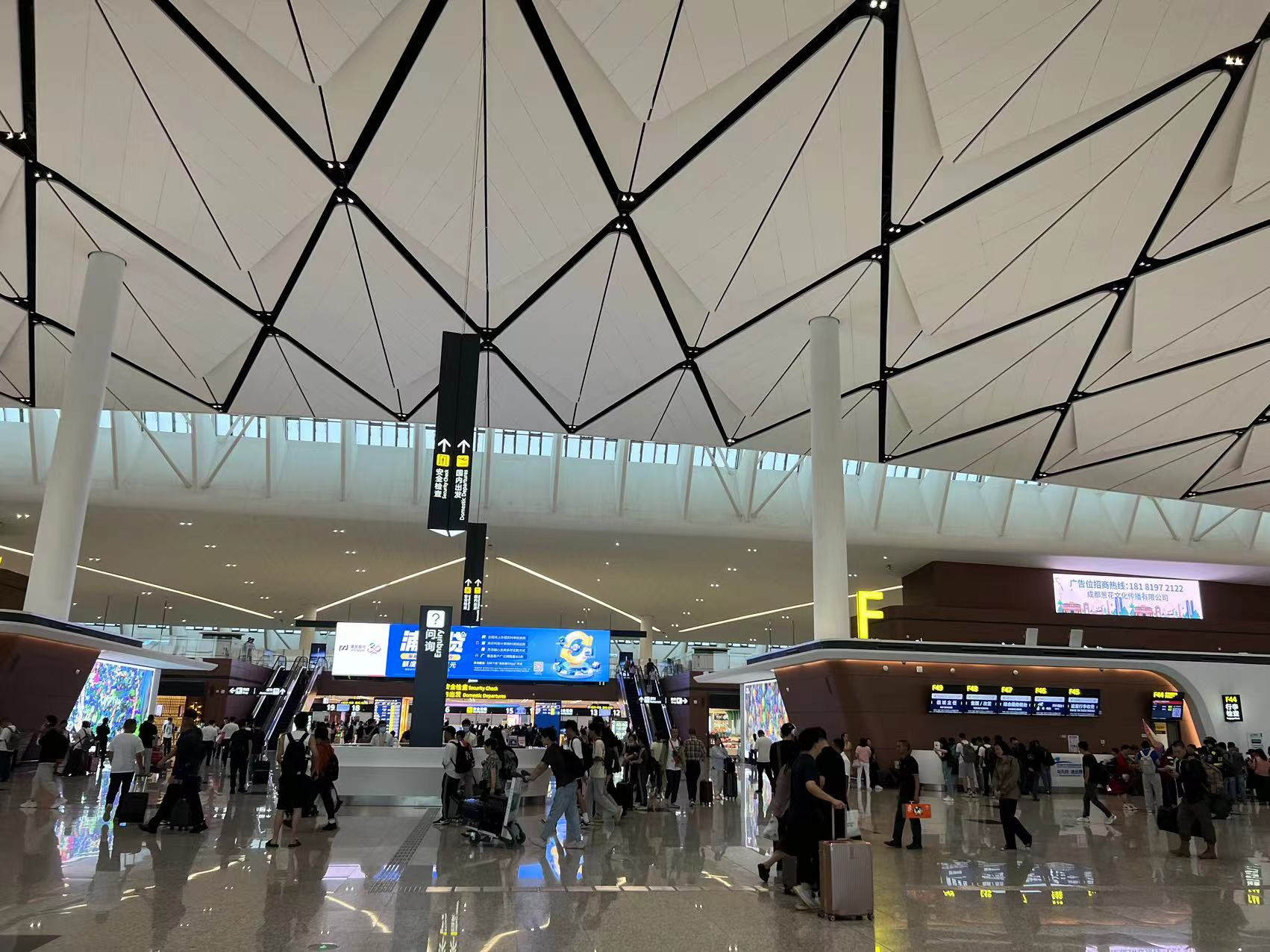
Terminal 2 (domestic departures)

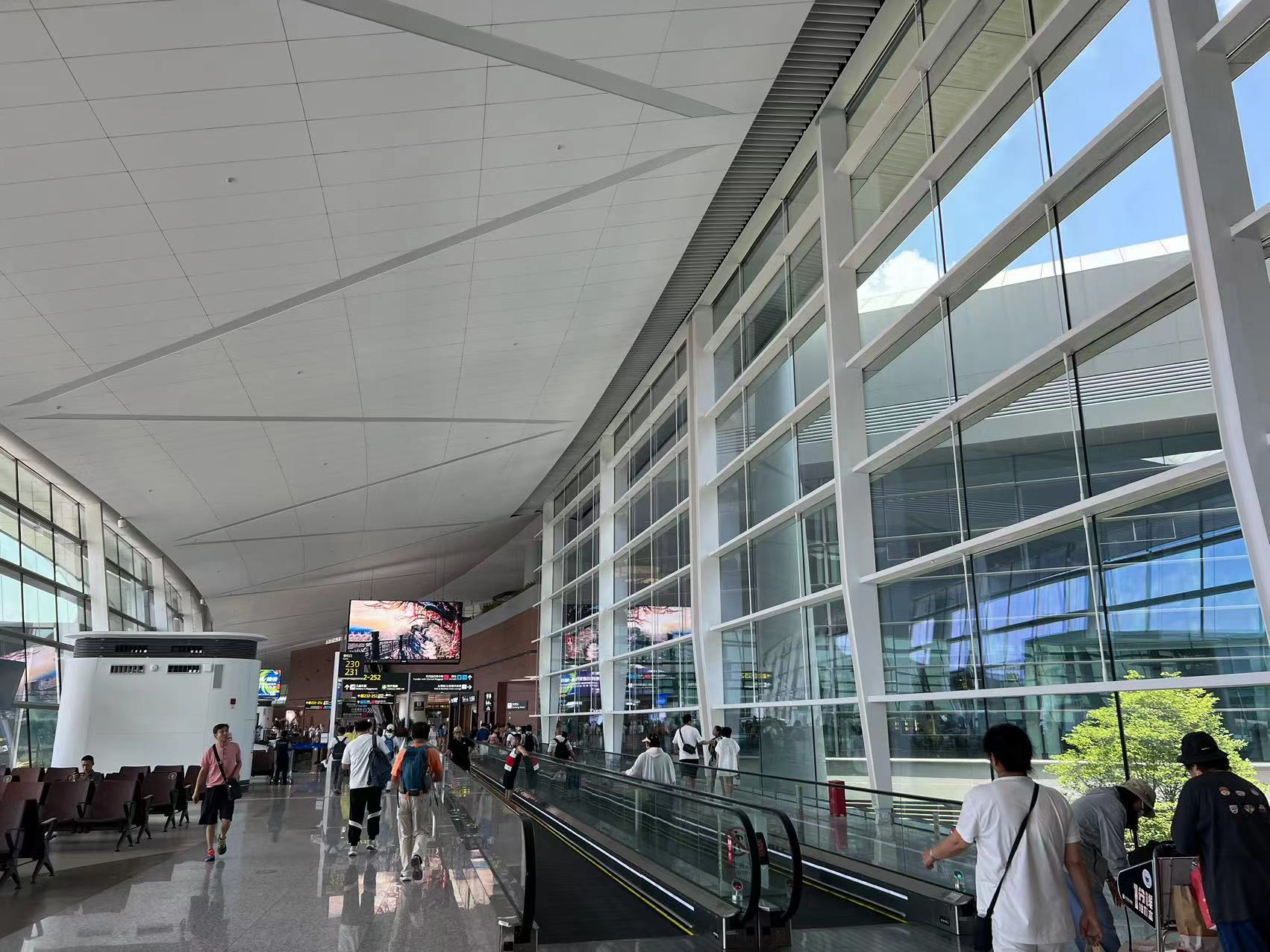
Airside of Terminal 2

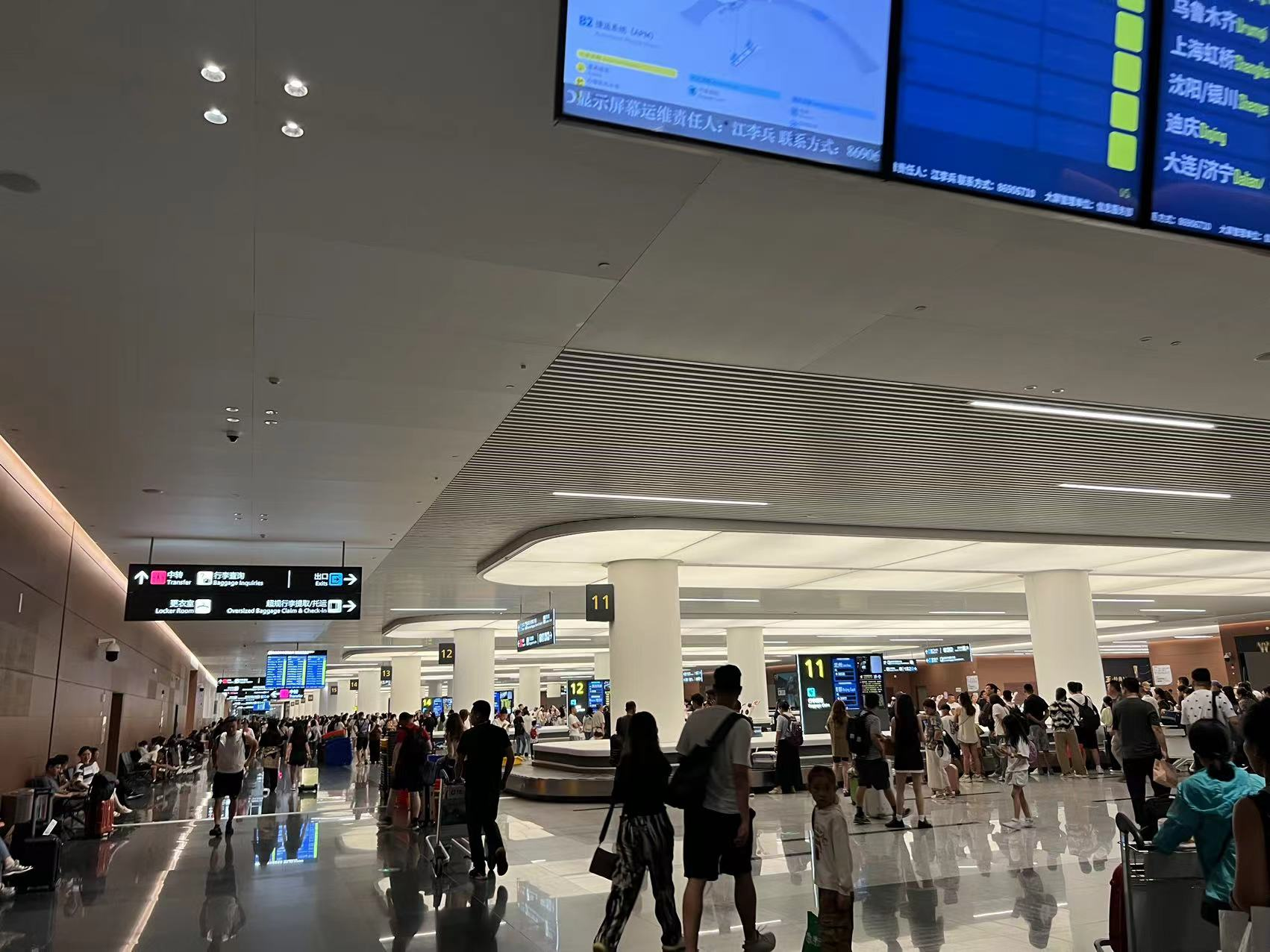
Baggage claim area of T2

== Airlines and destinations ==
Tianfu International Airport is a major base for Air China. The flag carrier operates maintenance facilities, a 1,500-bed staff hostel, and a 2,950 m^{2} (31,800 ft^{2}) lounge at the airport. Due to the COVID-19 pandemic, the airport did not operate international flights until 26 March 2023, taking over most international and cargo routes from Shuangliu International Airport, with the latter specializing in domestic flights. Beginning on 28 March 2023, Air China will change the flight to Taipei Taoyuan from Chengdu Shuangliu to Chengdu Tianfu.

Effective from 30 July 2026, some flights from these airlines will be transferred in batches from Terminal 1 of Tianfu Airport to Terminal 1 of Shuangliu Airport:

- 30 July 2026

- Air China: Chengdu and Taipei-Taoyuan
- Hong Kong Airlines: Chengdu and Hong Kong
- Cathay Pacific: Hong Kong and Chengdu
- Air Macau: Chengdu and Macau

- 31 July 2026

- Air China: Chengdu and Hong Kong
- Sichuan Airlines: Chengdu and Hong Kong, Chengdu and Taipei-Taoyuan
- Cathay Pacific: Chengdu and Hong Kong
- EVA Air: Chengdu and Taipei-Taoyuan

- 1 August 2026

- China Airlines: Chengdu and Taipei-Taoyuan

=== Passenger ===
Airlines	Destinations
Air Busan	Busan
Air China	Aksu, Brussels, Dalian, Fuzhou, Guilin, Hanoi (begins 13 January 2027), Hengyang, Hohhot, Hongyuan, Hotan, Huizhou, Jakarta–Soekarno-Hatta, Jinan, Karamay, Kashgar, Korla, Kuqa, Lanzhou, Linyi, Milan–Malpensa, Nanning, Nantong, Ningbo, Ordos, Paris–Charles de Gaulle, Quanzhou, Sanya, Tokyo–Narita, Wuyishan, Yantai, Yinchuan, Yining, Zhangjiajie, Zhuhai; Seasonal: London–Gatwick
Air Guilin	Guilin,
Air Travel	Baoshan, Kunming, Wuxi, Yantai
Asiana Airlines	Seoul–Incheon
Bangkok Airways	Koh Samui
Beijing Capital Airlines	Korla, Sanya, Yinchuan
Chengdu Airlines	Aral, Bangkok—Suvarnabhumi, Barkol, Beihai,Changzhou, Fuyuan, Fuyun, Hefei, Hohhot, Huizhou, Jixi, Kunming, Lhasa, Lijiang, Qinhuangdao, Qitai, Shache, Shanghai–Pudong, Shijiazhuang, Tacheng, Tumxuk, Turpan, Ürümqi, Xishuangbanna, Yancheng, Yueyang, Zhengzhou, Zhuhai
China Eastern Airlines	Baoshan, Changchun, Changsha, Dalian, Fuzhou, Haikou, Harbin, Huizhou, Jinan, Lhasa, Lijiang, Lincang, Osaka–Kansai, Shenzhen, Taichung, Wuhan, Wuxi, Xishuangbanna, Yantai, Yichang, Yining, Zhanjiang
China Express Airlines	Bayannur, Chifeng, Hohhot, Linyi, Nanjing, Qiqihar, Tangshan, Wuhai, Wuhu, Yan'an
China Southern Airlines	Beijing–Daxing, Changbaishan, Changchun, Changsha, Dalian, Daqing, Haikou, Harbin, Hotan, Kashgar, Korla, Mudanjiang, Nanning, Sanya, Shanghai–Pudong, Shenyang, Ürümqi, Wuhan, Xi'an, Yining, Yiwu, Zhengzhou, Zhuhai
China United Airlines	Foshan, Huizhou, Jinzhou, Jingdezhen, Qingdao, Wenzhou, Yulin (Shaanxi)
Chongqing Airlines	Dali, Huizhou
Colorful Guizhou Airlines	Huai'an, Jiujiang, Mangshi, Ningbo, Pu'er, Shenzhen, Xingyi
Donghai Airlines	Shangrao
Etihad Airways	Abu Dhabi (begins 6 March 2027)
Fuzhou Airlines	Fuzhou
GX Airlines	Jiayuguan, Jinan, Nanning, Xinyang
Hainan Airlines	Sanya, Vienna
Jiangxi Air	Beihai, Zhengzhou
Juneyao Air	Changsha, Liuzhou, Wuxi
Kunming Airlines	Kunming, Taiyuan, Xishuangbanna
Loong Air	Aral, Bishkek, Dalian, Heze, Jiaxing, Jingzhou, Shenzhen, Wenzhou, Xining, Xuzhou
Lucky Air	Bazhong, Bengbu, Dali,, Haikou, Harbin, Jinan, Kunming, Lijiang, Nanchang, Nanjing, Shijiazhuang, Xiamen, Xingtai, Yancheng, Zhuhai
Malaysia Airlines	Kuala Lumpur–International
Nok Air	Phuket
Okay Airways	Jieyang, Tianjin
Qatar Airways	Doha
Qingdao Airlines	Dalian, Hai Phong, Korla, Ürümqi, Zhengzhou
Royal Air Philippines	Charter: Kalibo
Ruili Airlines	Anyang, Datong, Harbin, Kunming, Shenyang, Tangshan, Wuxi, Xinzhou
S7 Airlines	Novosibirsk
Shandong Airlines	Jingdezhen, Lijiang, Xiamen
Shanghai Airlines	Shanghai–Pudong, Ürümqi
Sky Angkor Airlines	Phnom Penh
Shenzhen Airlines	Beijing–Capital, Dalian, Guangzhou, Haikou, Harbin, Hefei, Lanzhou, Nanjing, Nanning, Nantong, Quanzhou, Shaoyang, Shenyang, Shenzhen, Wuhan, Wuxi, Yantai, Yichang
Sichuan Airlines	Aksu, Altay, Anshan, Athens, Auckland (resumes 3 December 2026), Bole, Changzhou, Changde, Daocheng, Denpasar, Diqing, Dubai–International (resumes 1 January 2027), Dunhuang, Fuzhou, Gannan, Jiayuguan, Jiuzhaigou, Kuala Lumpur–International, Linfen, Liuzhou, Los Angeles, Madrid, Moscow–Sheremetyevo, Nanning, Nantong, Saint Petersburg, Sanya, Shijiazhuang, Shiyan, Songyuan, Sydney, Vientiane, Xining,, Yancheng, Yantai, Zhengzhou, Zhoushan, Zhuhai; Seasonal: Mahé
Singapore Airlines	Singapore
Spring Airlines	Altay, Bangkok–Suvarnabhumi, Enshi, Jieyang, Jinan, Phuket
Sun PhuQuoc Airways	Ho Chi Minh City, Phu Quoc
Thai Airways International	Bangkok–Suvarnabhumi
Thai Lion Air	Bangkok–Don Mueang
Tianjin Airlines	Ruoqiang, Tianjin, Ürümqi, Xiangxi
Tibet Airlines	Hong Kong, Lhasa
Turkish Airlines	Istanbul
Urumqi Air	Ürümqi, Zhanjiang
VietJet Air	Hanoi, Ho Chi Minh City
Vietnam Airlines	Hanoi
XiamenAir	Fuzhou
Xizang Airlines	Lancang

=== Cargo ===
Airlines	Destinations	Refs
AirBridgeCargo	Novosibirsk, Zhengzhou (all suspended)	
SF Airlines	Chennai, Delhi, Dhaka, Hangzhou, Kathmandu, Lhasa, Mumbai, Shenzhen	
Sichuan Airlines Cargo	Frankfurt, Delhi, Helsinki, Singapore	
Suparna Airlines Cargo	Moscow–Zhukovsky	
UPS Airlines	Warsaw–Chopin	

== Future expansion ==
The new Terminal 3 and third runway is under construction, scheduled to put into operation at midnight of 28 October 2026.

== Ground transportation ==
=== Internal transportation ===
The two airport terminals are connected by an Innovia automated people mover (APM) supplied by joint venture firm Puzhen Bombardier Transportation Systems Limited, which has also won the operations and maintenance contract.

To connect airport parking to the two terminal buildings there will be a personal rapid transit system, consisting of 6 miles (9.7 km) of guideway, four stations and 22 pods. However, as of 2025, the PRT has not been commissioned.

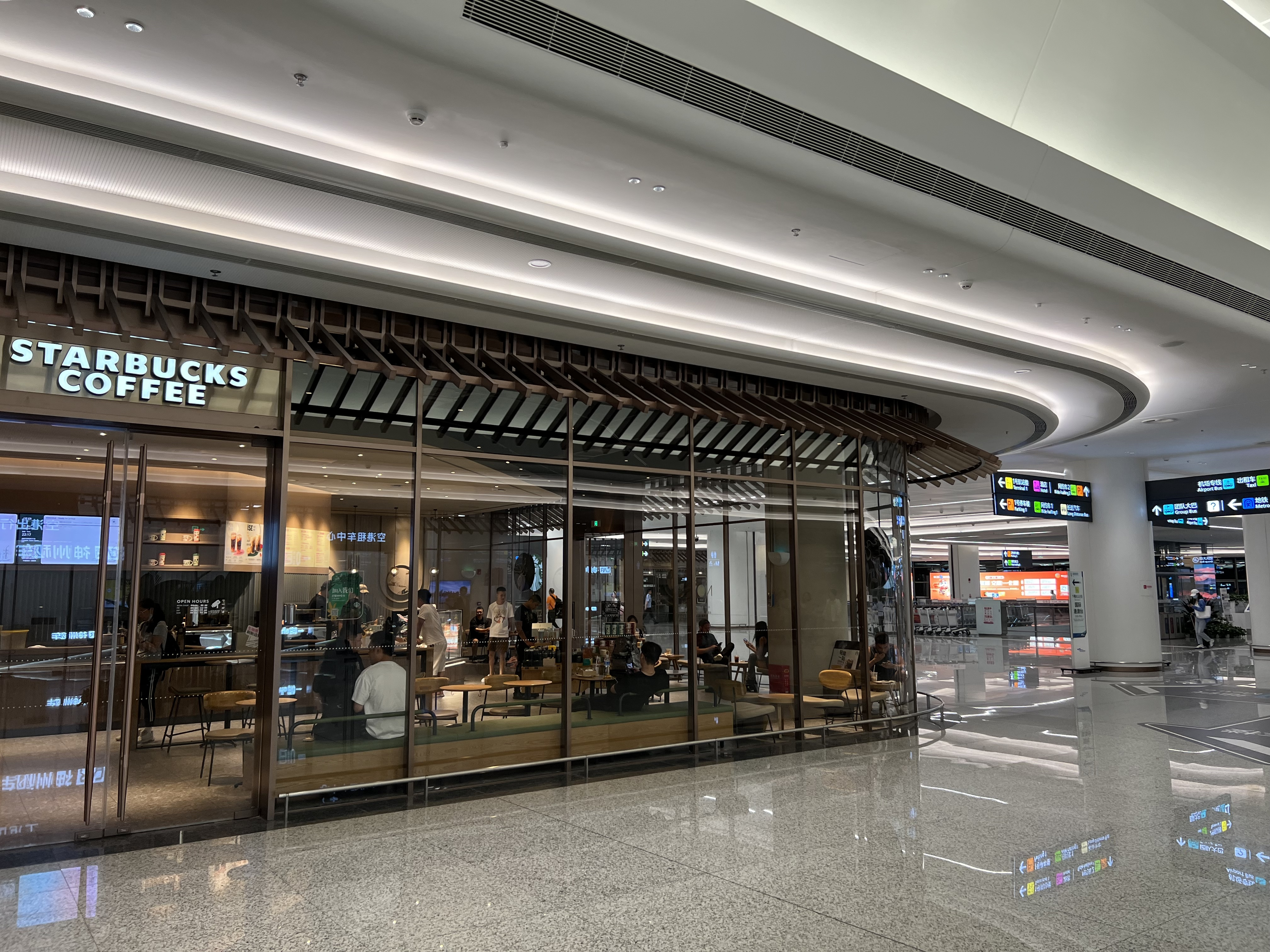
GTC Area of Tianfu Int'l Airport

=== External transportation ===
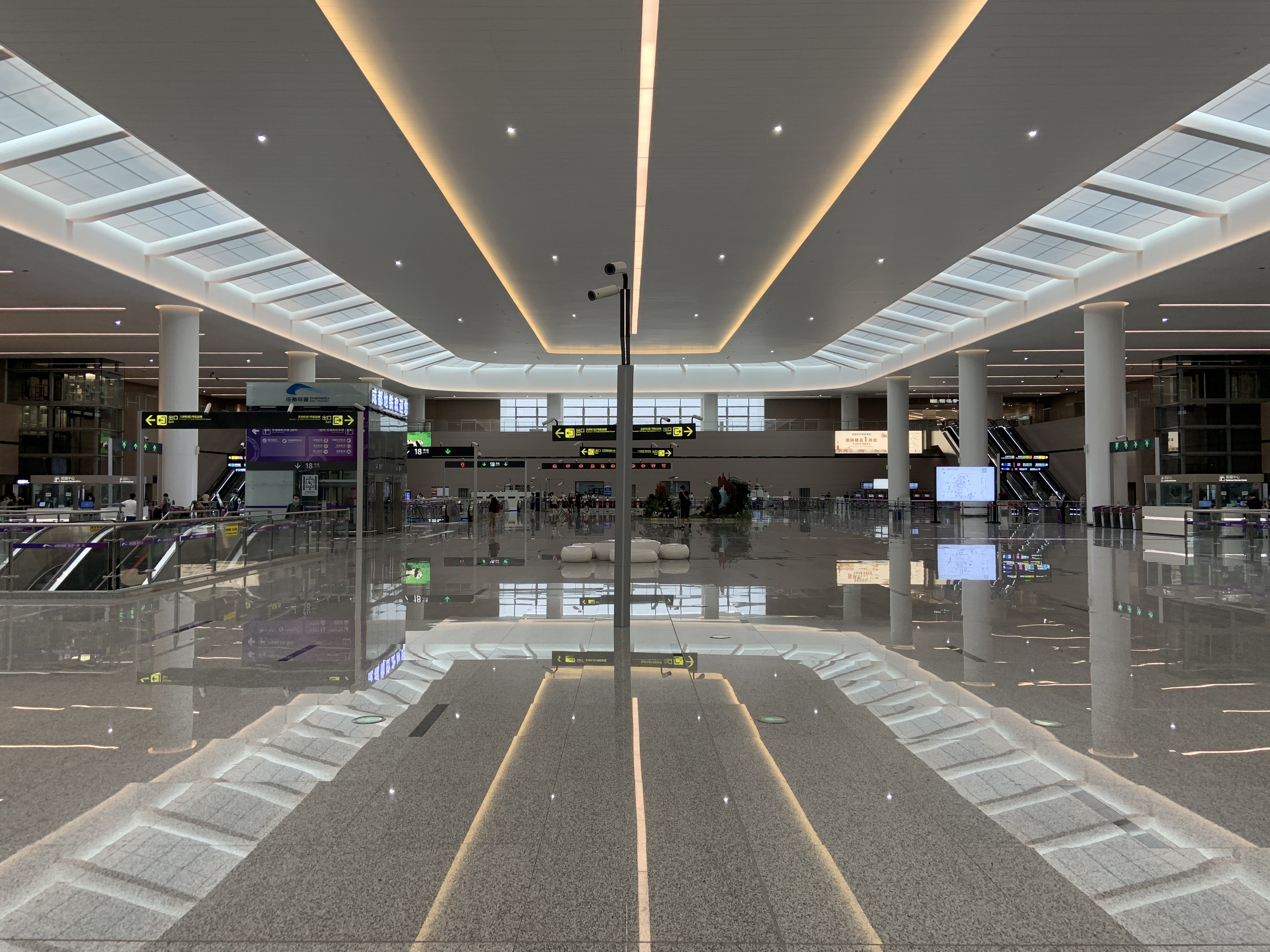
Concourse of Tianfu International Airport Terminal 1&2 Station

==== Highway ====
- Chengdu Tianfu International Airport Expressway connecting the airport to Chengdu's Third Ring Road. Opened December 2020.
- Ziyang - Sanchahu Lake (Jianyang) Highway
- Jianyang - Tianfu Airport - Renshou Highway

==== Metro (Subway) ====
- Chengdu Metro Line 18 - Connection to Chengdu South railway station (about 40 min for normal trains and 30 min for express trains), opened since December 2020 (Chengdu Metro Line 18 Service Hours: 5:55 am to 11:30 pm). Its extension work to Chengdu railway station is under construction.
- Chengdu Metro Line 19, on partially shared tracks with Line 18, has been in operation since November 2023 to provide a 30-minute express connection (about 40 min for normal trains) to Chengdu Shuangliu International Airport.

==== Bus ====
Five bus routes are provided to connect with central Chengdu, and passengers can take different buses to Chunxi Road (via Chengdu East (Chengdu Dong) Railway Station), Global Center, Jinsha Transport Hub Station, and Chengdu Shuangliu International Airport, respectively. The bus service runs 24/7.

==== High-speed train ====
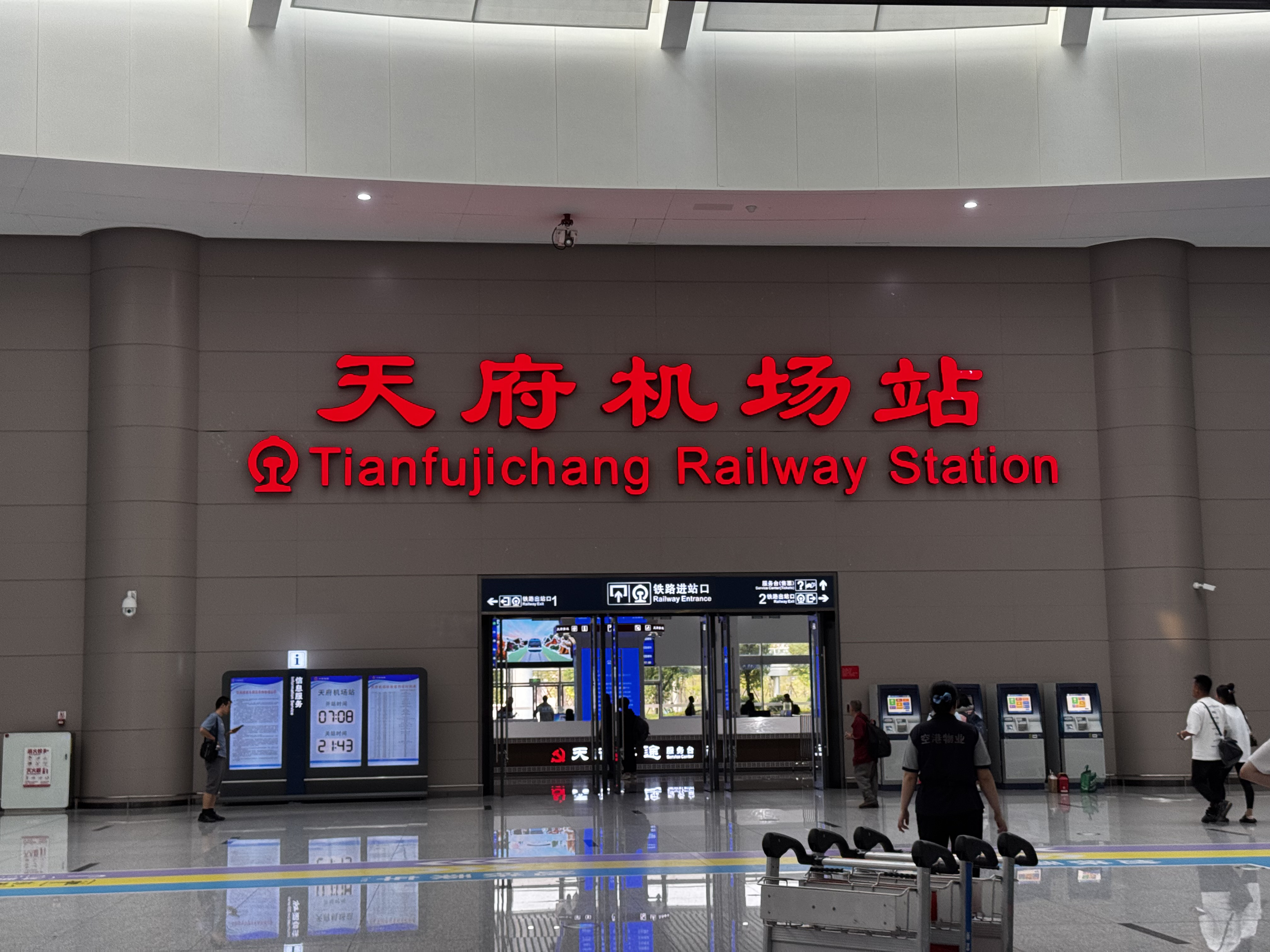
The entrance to CR Tianfu Airport Railway Station

High-speed rail connects to the airport as part of the Chengdu–Yibin high-speed railway connecting northerly to Chengdu East railway station, southerly to Zigong, Ziyang Neijaing and more cities. Tianfu Jichang Station (Tianfu Airport Station) and the high-speed rail station has been in operation since December 2023.

==== Taxi ====
There are taxi and mobile app car-hailing services to the city centre.

== Visa-exemption transit ==
=== 240-hour visa-free transit ===
Holders of passports issued by 54 countries do not require a visa for a 240-hour stay if they are transiting through Chengdu Tianfu International Airport / Chengdu Shuangliu International Airport of entry, provided that they:

- hold passports valid for at least three months from the date of intended arrival and visas for the destination countries (if required); and
- hold ticket receipts (with confirmed seats, if applicable) departing in 240 hours, which shows that their first destination (including stopovers of any kind) outside China is located in a third country. Hong Kong and Macau are considered as third territories for transit purposes.

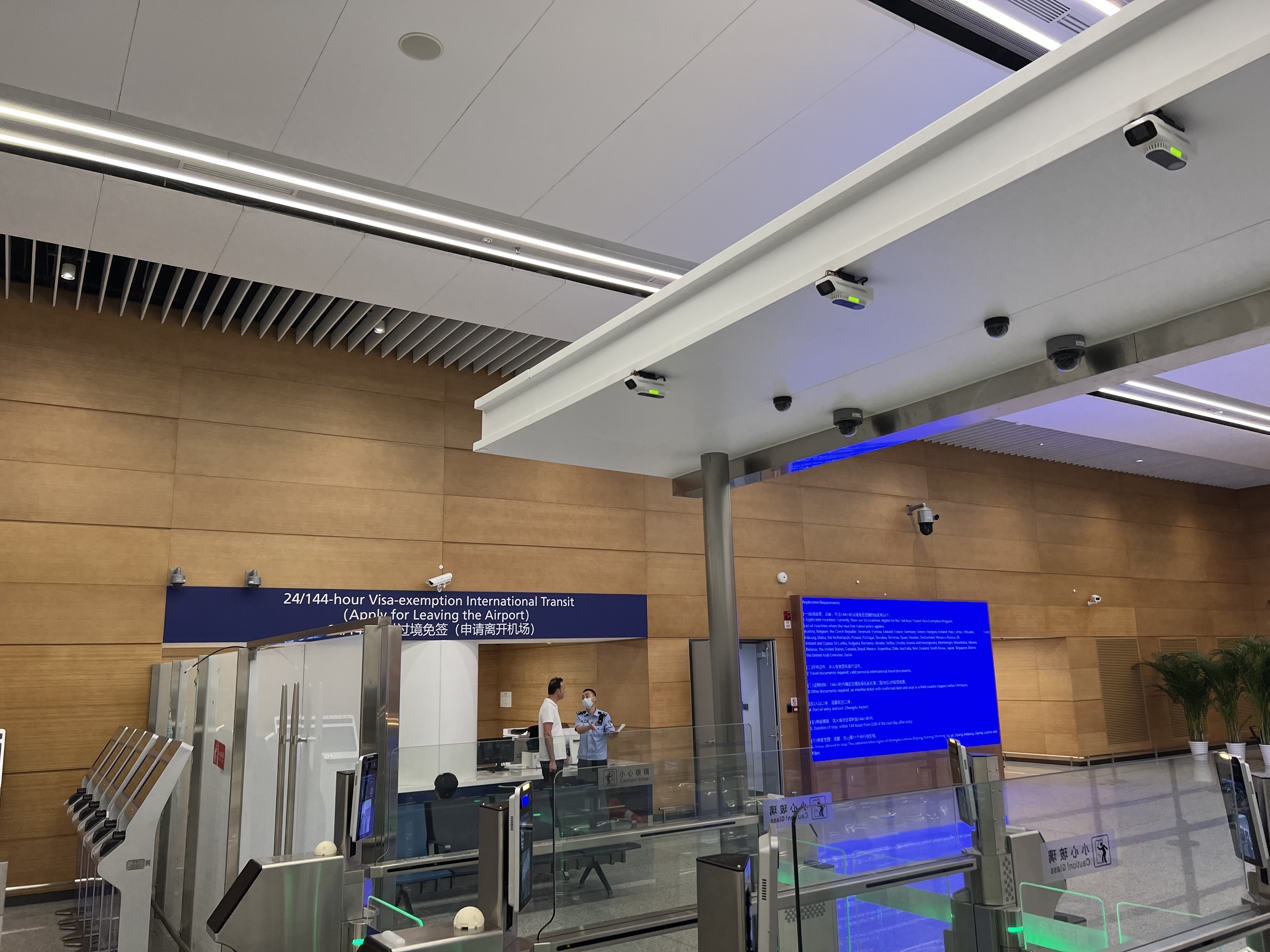
24/144-hour visa-exemption int'l transit application counter at Chengdu Tianfu Int'l Airport

In order to qualify for the 240-hour visa-free transit, the traveler's inbound and outbound flights must directly arrive at and depart from one of the acceptable ports of entry from or to a third country (including one of the two SARs of Hong Kong and Macau). Both flights must have no stopovers of any kind within mainland China prior to arrival or after departure at the port of entry, and the outbound flight's first stop or destination must be in a different country than the inbound flight's. Travels between U.S. territories and the contiguous U.S. are also ineligible for the 240-hour transit-without-visa, unless one of their flights has a stopover in a third country or a SAR.

A passenger who completed the inspection process will be given a temporary entry permit, which may be in the form of a stamp or a sticker, with the approved area of stay as well as date of entry and departure.

Travelers utilizing the 240-hour visa-free transit scheme at Chengdu airports (both Chengdu Tianfu International Airport and Chengdu Shuangliu International Airport) are authorized to travel within the certain region in China according to the policy.

==== Eligible countries ====
- European Union member states (Note: Visa-exempt in general (except nationals of the Czech Republic, Lithuania and Sweden, who are visa-exempt only for transit).)
- Albania
- Argentina
- Australia
- Belarus
- Bosnia and Herzegovina
- Brazil
- Brunei
- Canada
- Chile
- Iceland
- Japan
- Mexico
- Monaco
- Montenegro
- New Zealand
- North Macedonia
- Norway
- Qatar
- Russia
- Serbia
- Singapore
- South Korea
- Switzerland
- Ukraine
- United Arab Emirates
- United Kingdom (Note: For British citizens only.)
- United States

=== 24-hour visa-free transit ===
Under the 24-hour visa-exemption policy, a visa is not required for travelers who:

- hold a passport valid for at least three months from the date of entry;
- arrive by air, cruise ship or train (except for arriving at certain airports listed below);
- hold confirmed air, cruise ship or train tickets to a third-country final destination outside mainland China departing in 24 hours (standby tickets are not allowed); and,
- depart mainland China on a flight, cruise ship or train within 24 hours after arrival.

All nationalities are eligible for the 24-hour visa-exemption international transit through Chengdu Tianfu International Airport.

== See also ==
- List of airports in China
- List of the busiest airports in China
