= Shiyan Wudangshan Airport =

Shiyan Wudangshan Airport 十堰武当山机场
- IATA: WDS; ICAO: ZHSY

Summary
- Airport type: Public
- Serves: Shiyan, Hubei
- Location: Maojian District, Shiyan
- Opened: 5 February 2016; 10 years ago
- Coordinates: 32°35′30″N 110°54′28″E

Map
- Location of airport in Hubei

Runways
Direction	Length		Surface
Direction	m	ft	Surface
13/31	2,600	8,530

Statistics (2025)
- Passengers: 1,533,810
- Cargo: 3,158.6
- Aircraft movements: 15,704
- Source: List of the busiest airports in the People's Republic of China

Shiyan Wudangshan Airport
- Simplified Chinese: 十堰武当山机场
- Traditional Chinese: 十堰武當山機場
Transcriptions
Standard Mandarin
- Hanyu Pinyin: Shíyàn Wǔdāngshān Jīchǎng

Shiyan Wudangshan Airport (IATA: WDS, ICAO: ZHSY) is an airport serving the city of Shiyan in northwestern Hubei Province, China. It is located 15 kilometres (9.3 mi) from the city center and 20 kilometres (12 mi) from Wudangshan, the World Heritage Site after which it is named. The airport cost 1.635 billion yuan to build, and it opened on 5 February 2016, when its inaugural flight arrived from Hangzhou Xiaoshan International Airport.

== History ==
In 1981, Shiyan City included the construction of an airport in its overall plan. The provincial government submitted a report to the Central Military Commission and the State Council on the construction of Shiyan Airport. However, due to the constraints of the then-existing system of separate municipal and prefectural administration, particularly funding constraints, the project ultimately failed.

In 1992, Shiyan officially established an airport construction office and spent several million yuan to hire the Guangzhou Air Force Survey and Design Institute to prepare a feasibility report. This feasibility report alone took more than a year to complete, and on-site site surveys were conducted. Three alternative sites were considered: Liubei in Yunxian County, Bailang, and Sunjiawan in Liuliping. After on-site surveys of Bailang and Liuliping, experts concluded that Bailang was more suitable as a site, but nearly 30 obstacles would result in a massive amount of work. It was estimated that building the airport would require over 700 million yuan, with 56% of the investment going towards earthwork.

In 2002, experts concluded that building a new civil airport within Shiyan is technically very difficult, due to the complex mountainous terrain, coupled with limitations in national aviation planning, investment policies, and scale, this dream, which resembled a dazzling bubble, was shattered once again. In 2002, Shiyan's annual fiscal revenue was about 2 billion yuan, while building an airport would require at least 1.2 billion yuan. Building a new airport is clearly not feasible. Shiyan then opted for a less ambitious plan, aiming to renovate the Laohekou military airport and rename it Wudangshan Airport. It would only take one hour to get from there to Shiyan, and the total investment would only be 50 million yuan. In 2003, some graduates from flight schools were invited to Shiyan to participate in the preparatory work.

In 2003, the Laohekou military airport was converted into Wudangshan Airport for use by Shiyan, and its joint military-civilian use was implemented. The Wudangshan Airport Administration was also officially established.

In 2008, Shiyan devoted itself to the construction of the Western Hubei Ecological and Cultural Tourism Circle, relying on its mountains, rivers, and rich culture to develop integrated mountain and water tourism. At that time, the proposal to build a new airport was submitted for the third time, and Shiyan City re-established the Airport Construction Office.

On October 14, 2012, the State Council and the Central Military Commission approved the airport project; on December 24, 2013, the National Development and Reform Commission approved the airport's feasibility study report, giving the airport construction its permit. The total investment for the airport construction was estimated at 1.533 billion yuan, and it was planned to be completed and open to traffic in 2015. On May 8, 2014, the airport's overall plan was approved. On May 15, 2014, the airport's preliminary design was approved. In December 2015, the Shiyan Wudangshan Airport successfully completed its calibration and test flights. At 8:53 a.m. on February 5, 2016, an A320 passenger plane from Hangzhou Xiaoshan Airport landed smoothly at Wudangshan Airport, marking the official opening of Shiyan Wudangshan Airport.

In 2021, the Wudangshan Airport International Terminal and Apron Construction Project officially commenced. The main project includes a 13,000-square-meter main international terminal building, four Class C jet bridges located near the aircraft parking positions, and service access roads surrounding the apron. The project also includes a parking system with 346 parking spaces in front of the terminal, a 6,710-square-meter underground parking garage and connecting passageways, and a newly built 15,678-square-meter green plaza. The total investment for the project is 450 million RMB, and it was scheduled to be completed in 2024.

On May 24, 2024, the newly built international terminal and apron project at Wudangshan Airport successfully passed the civil aviation industry's acceptance inspection. The international terminal was designed to meet the target of 300,000 international passenger throughput by 2030, and the air port was constructed according to formal international airport standards. On August 27, the National Port Administration Office officially approved the temporary opening of Shiyan Wudangshan Airport for international passenger services, marking the official realization of cross-border charter direct flights at Wudangshan Airport. From October 8 to 17, the airport will launch a charter direct flight route between Shiyan and Hong Kong.

== Facilities ==
The airport has a 2,600-metre (8,500 ft) runway, which can handle Boeing 737-800 and Airbus A320 aircraft. It covers an area of 2800.5 mu.

== Airlines and destinations ==
Airlines	Destinations
Air China	Beijing–Capital, Beijing–Daxing, Dalian, Kunming
Air Guilin	Guilin, Hohhot
Air Travel	Wuxi, Xishuangbanna
Beijing Capital Airlines	Haikou, Lijiang, Nanjing, Shenyang
China Eastern Airlines	Chengdu–Tianfu, Xiamen
China Express Airlines	Chongqing, Wenzhou
China Southern Airlines	Guangzhou
Donghai Airlines	Chongqing, Hangzhou, Quanzhou, Shenzhen
GX Airlines	Jinan, Nanning
LJ Air	Harbin
Shandong Airlines	Guiyang, Qingdao, Taiyuan, Xiamen
Shanghai Airlines	Shanghai–Pudong
Spring Airlines	Lanzhou, Nanjing, Ningbo
Sichuan Airlines	Chengdu–Tianfu
Tianjin Airlines	Sanya, Tianjin, Urumqi, Xi'an
West Air	Lhasa

== See also ==
- List of airports in China
- List of the busiest airports in China
