= Bengbu Tenghu Airport =

Bengbu Tenghu Airport 蚌埠腾湖机场
- Bengbu Tenghu Airport Logo
- IATA: BFY; ICAO: ZSBA

Summary
- Airport type: Public
- Serves: Bengbu, Anhui, China
- Opened: 29 April 2026; 6 months ago
- Coordinates: 33.1660°N 117.0570°E

Map
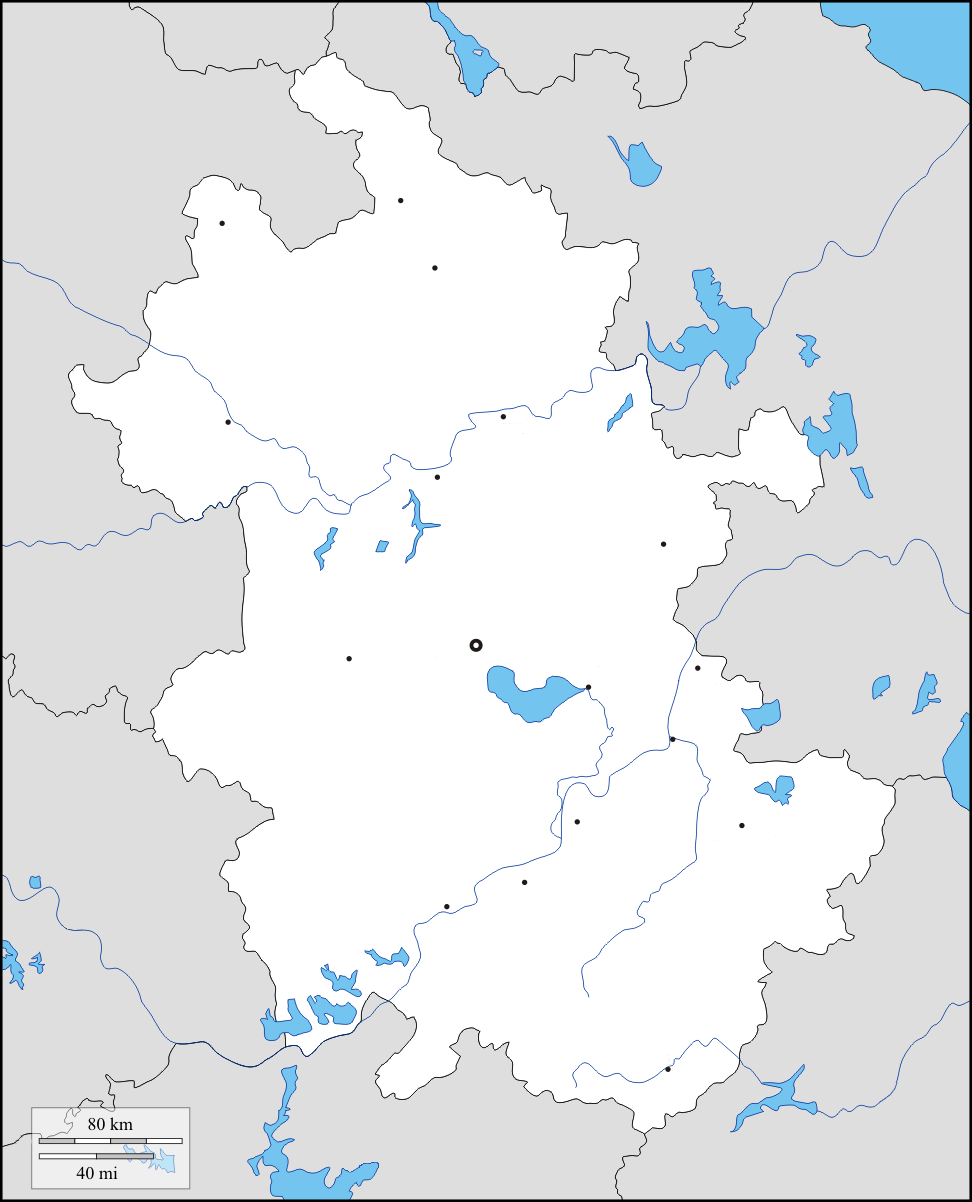
- Location of airport in Anhui#Location in China BFY/ZSBA (China)

Runways
Direction	Length		Surface
Direction	m	ft	Surface
07/25	2,600	8,530	Concrete

Bengbu Tenghu Airport (IATA: BFY, ICAO: ZSBA) is an airport located in Huaiyuan county of Bengbu City in Anhui Province of East China. Construction of Bengbu Tenghu Airport was completed in May 2025, and it commenced operations on 29 April 2026.

== Facilities ==
The airport has a terminal building with an area of 26,000 m^{2} and a single runway class 4C measuring 2,600 m by 45 m. It has 11 parking spots for airplanes.

Bengbu Tenghu Airport is planning to handle 1.8 million passengers and 10000 tons of cargo per year and eventually targeting to be able to handle 6 million passengers and 50,000 tons of cargo per year. The runway will be extended by 600 meters to 3200 meters, and related facilities will be expanded if needed in the future. The airport is planning to open international and cargo routes, targeting 53000 commercial and 800 cargo aircraft movements.

The first commercial flight from Shenzhen to Bengbu Airport operated by Donghai Airlines will be inaugurated on 29 April 2026. From 1 May 2026, Donghai Airlines opened new routes from Shenzhen to Dalian via Bengbu Airport.

In the first year of operation plan, the airport will gradually open 8 routes to 11 cities including Guangzhou, Chengdu, Chongqing, Haikou and Harbin.

== Airlines and Destinations ==
Airlines	Destinations
Donghai Airlines	Shenzhen, Dalian
GX Airlines	Haikou
Lucky Air	Chengdu-Tianfu, Harbin, Kunming

== See also ==
- List of airports in China
- List of the busiest airports in China
