= Baoshan Yunrui Airport =

Baoshan Yunrui Airport 保山云瑞机场
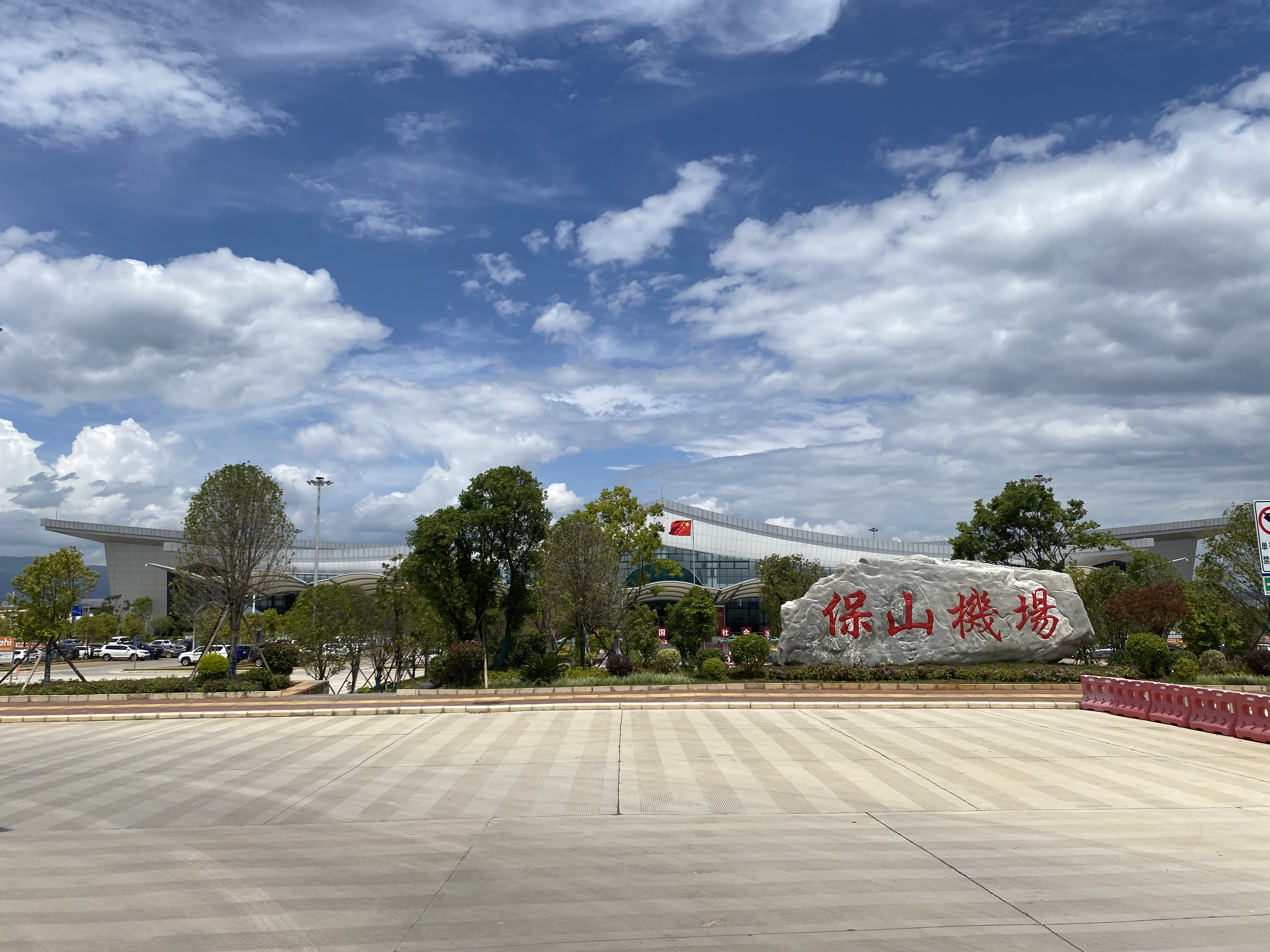
- IATA: BSD; ICAO: ZPBS

Summary
- Airport type: Public
- Serves: Baoshan, Yunnan
- Elevation AMSL: 1,662 m / 5,453 ft
- Coordinates: 25°03′12″N 99°10′06″E
- Website: bs.ynairport.com

Map
- Location of airport in Yunnan

Runways
Direction	Length		Surface
Direction	m	ft	Surface
01/19	2,400	7,874

Statistics (2025)
- Passengers: 474,348
- Aircraft movements: 4,056
- Cargo (metric tons): 1,559.9

Baoshan Yunrui Airport
- Simplified Chinese: 保山云瑞机场
- Traditional Chinese: 保山雲瑞機場
Transcriptions
Standard Mandarin
- Hanyu Pinyin: Bǎoshān Yúnruì Jīchǎng

Baoshan Yunrui Airport (IATA: BSD, ICAO: ZPBS) is an airport in Baoshan, Yunnan, China.

Its single runway is 2,400 m (7,900 ft) long.

The airport has 9 boarding gates, of which 5 are equipped with passenger boarding bridges (jetways).

== History ==
Baoshan Yunrui Airport was originally called Baoshan Airport. Baoshan Airport was first built in 1929, located 9 kilometers from the urban area of Longyang District, Baoshan City, at an altitude of 1664.05 meters. Originally a military airport, it was the main take-off and landing airport for the famous "Hump" air route and an important airport for the Kuomintang government army in the War of Resistance against Japan. After July 1941, Baoshan Airport became a key hub in the Sino-American War of Resistance against Japan. The U.S. Air Force's 14th and 10th Air Forces were successively stationed there, ensuring air transport for the war effort in western Yunnan and the "Hump" airlift route.

In May 1942, to prevent Baoshan Airport from falling into Japanese hands, the Kuomintang destroyed the airport itself. In April 1944, emergency repairs were carried out on the airport to support the Western Yunnan Campaign; in May 1944, US Airforce launched the Western Yunnan Counter-Offensive against the Japanese army. In October 1944, the expansion project of Baoshan Airport began. In October 1945, the expansion project was completed, with the runway extended to 1800 meters long and 45 meters wide.

On December 9, 1949, the 41st Division of the CCP Army officially took over the airport.

Baoshan Airport was converted from a military airport to a civilian airport in 1958, becoming the first prefecture-level civilian airport to open in China. The airport runway was expanded in 1980, and in October 1981, it switched to using Soviet-made An-24 48-seat passenger planes. In May 1990, it was forced to close due to the obsolescence of the aircraft. Four years later, in 1994, after renovation and expansion, the runway was 2,400 meters long, the flight area was classified as 4C, and it could accommodate Boeing 737-700, with a designed annual throughput of 150,000 passengers.

In 2005, Baoshan Airport was officially renamed Baoshan Yunrui Airport.

The expansion and renovation of Baoshan Airport commenced in 2015, with the project implemented in three phases. The first phase included the construction of a new terminal building, taxiways, aprons, and other facilities, with an investment of 1,027.08 million yuan. The second phase included extending the runway 600 meters northward and constructing bypass runways, with an investment of 1,140 million yuan. The third phase primarily involves the construction of a new intersecting runway to enable large passenger aircraft to take off in both directions. Upon completion, the airport will be able to handle 1.8 million passengers annually. The Baoshan Airport expansion and renovation project finally commenced on September 28, 2018. Construction of the new taxiway and apron was completed on September 10, 2020, passed industry acceptance on June 22, 2021, and officially put into use on June 28.

On June 22, 2021, Baoshan Yunrui Airport's Terminal 2 passed industry acceptance; on June 26, the transfer and trial operation of Baoshan Yunrui Airport's Terminal 2 began; and on June 28, Terminal 2 officially opened. Terminal 2 has a building area of 26,929 square meters and five boarding bridges, capable of handling 1.8 million passengers annually.

According to the 2026 Government Report, the renovation and expansion project of Baoshan Yunrui Airport was completed and put into use.

== Airlines and destinations ==
Airlines	Destinations
Air Travel	Changsha, Chengdu–Tianfu, Nanjing, Shenzhen, Wuxi
China Eastern Airlines	Chengdu–Tianfu, Kunming

== See also ==
- List of airports in the People's Republic of China
