= Yichang Sanxia International Airport =

Yichang Sanxia International Airport 宜昌三峡国际机场
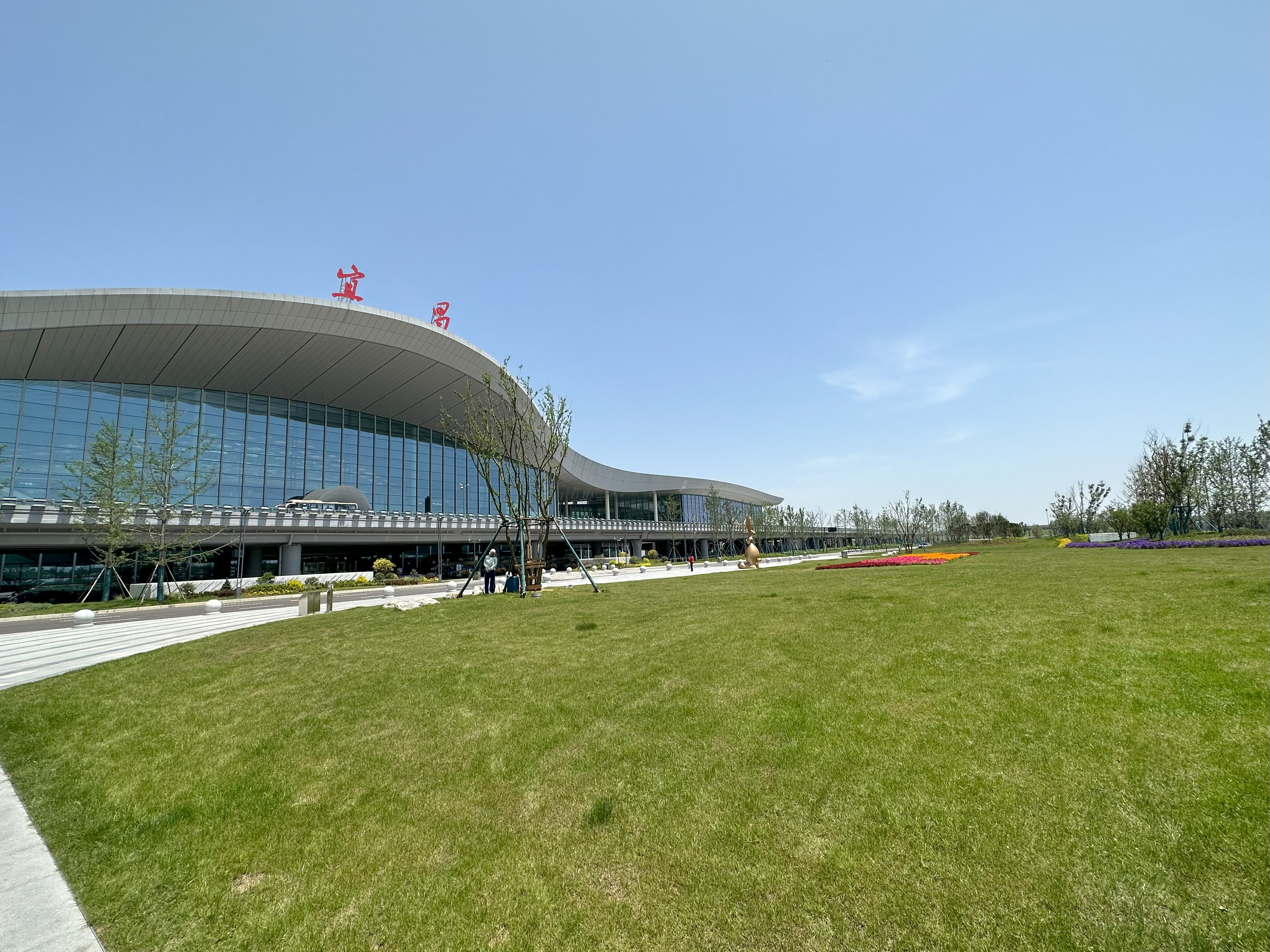
- IATA: YIH; ICAO: ZHYC

Summary
- Airport type: Public
- Operator: HNA Infrastructure Investment Group
- Location: Yichang, Hubei, China
- Elevation AMSL: 205 m (673 ft)
- Coordinates: 30°33′23.3″N 111°28′47.8″E
- Website: www.sanxiaairport.com

Map
- Location in Hubei YIH/ZHYC (China)

Runways
Direction	Length		Surface
Direction	m	ft	Surface
14/32	3,200	10,499	Concrete

Statistics (2025)
- Passengers: 3,406,149
- Aircraft movements: 76,344
- Cargo (metric tons): 13,324.6

Yichang Sanxia International Airport
- Simplified Chinese: 宜昌三峡国际机场
- Traditional Chinese: 宜昌三峽國際機場
Transcriptions
Standard Mandarin
- Hanyu Pinyin: Yíchāng Sānxiá Guójì Jīchǎng

Yichang Sanxia International Airport (IATA: YIH, ICAO: ZHYC), opened to traffic on 28 December 1996, is a Class 4D international regional airport located at the junction of Yunchi Subdistrict in Xiaoting District, Yaoqueling Town in Yiling District, and Anfusi Town in Zhijiang City, about 22 km northwest of downtown Yichang in Hubei Province, China.

== History ==
Yichang Sanxia Airport was approved as a national construction project by the State Council and the Central Military Commission on 18 January 1993. Construction officially began in September 1994. The airport passed national completion acceptance in October 1996, and on 28 December 1996 it received its operating license and opened to air traffic. The first flight to take off from the airport was a Boeing 737 bound for Beijing, departing Yichang at 1:36 p.m. on 28 December 1996.

On 24 February 2022, the runway at Yichang Sanxia Airport was extended to 3,200 meters. On 23 June 2022, the airport's Terminal 2 officially entered service. In July 2022, renovation work began on the T1 International Terminal at Sanxia Airport, and the project has now been fully completed. The number of international contact stands increased from one to four, and the floor area of Terminal 1 expanded from 14,800 square meters to 16,500 square meters. On 17 April 2024, Yichang Sanxia Airport was renamed Yichang Sanxia International Airport.

== Airlines and destinations ==
=== Passenger ===
Airlines	Destinations
Air Changan	Wenzhou, Xi'an; Charter: Kuala Lumpur–International, Kuching
Air China	Beijing–Capital, Beijing–Daxing
Beijing Capital Airlines	Guiyang, Haikou, Hangzhou, Shijiazhuang
Chengdu Airlines	Chengdu–Shuangliu
China Eastern Airlines	Beihai, Chengdu–Tianfu, Fuzhou, Kunming, Quanzhou, Shanghai–Pudong, Taiyuan
China Express Airlines	Guiyang, Zunyi–Maotai
China Southern Airlines	Guangzhou, Jieyang
Donghai Airlines	Beijing–Daxing, Jinan, Lanzhou, Nantong, Qingdao, Shenzhen, Xishuangbanna, Zhuhai
Greater Bay Airlines	Hong Kong
GX Airlines	Nanning, Shenyang
Hainan Airlines	Beijing–Capital, Haikou, Singapore
Jin Air	Seoul–Incheon
Juneyao Air	Shanghai-Pudong
Lucky Air	Kunming, Ningbo
Shanghai Airlines	Shanghai–Pudong
Shenzhen Airlines	Chengdu-Tianfu, Quanzhou, Shenyang, Shenzhen, Taiyuan
Tianjin Airlines	Guiyang, Haikou, Huizhou, Sanya, Shijiazhuang, Tianjin, Ürümqi, Xiamen, Xuzhou, Yangzhou, Yantai, Yinchuan
Xizang Airlines	Dali, Nanjing
Yakutia Airlines	Seasonal charter: Khabarovsk, Vladivostok

== See also ==
- List of airports in the People's Republic of China
