= Wuxi Shuofang Airport =

Commercial airport in Wuxi, Jiangsu, China

Wuxi Shuofang Airport 无锡硕放机场

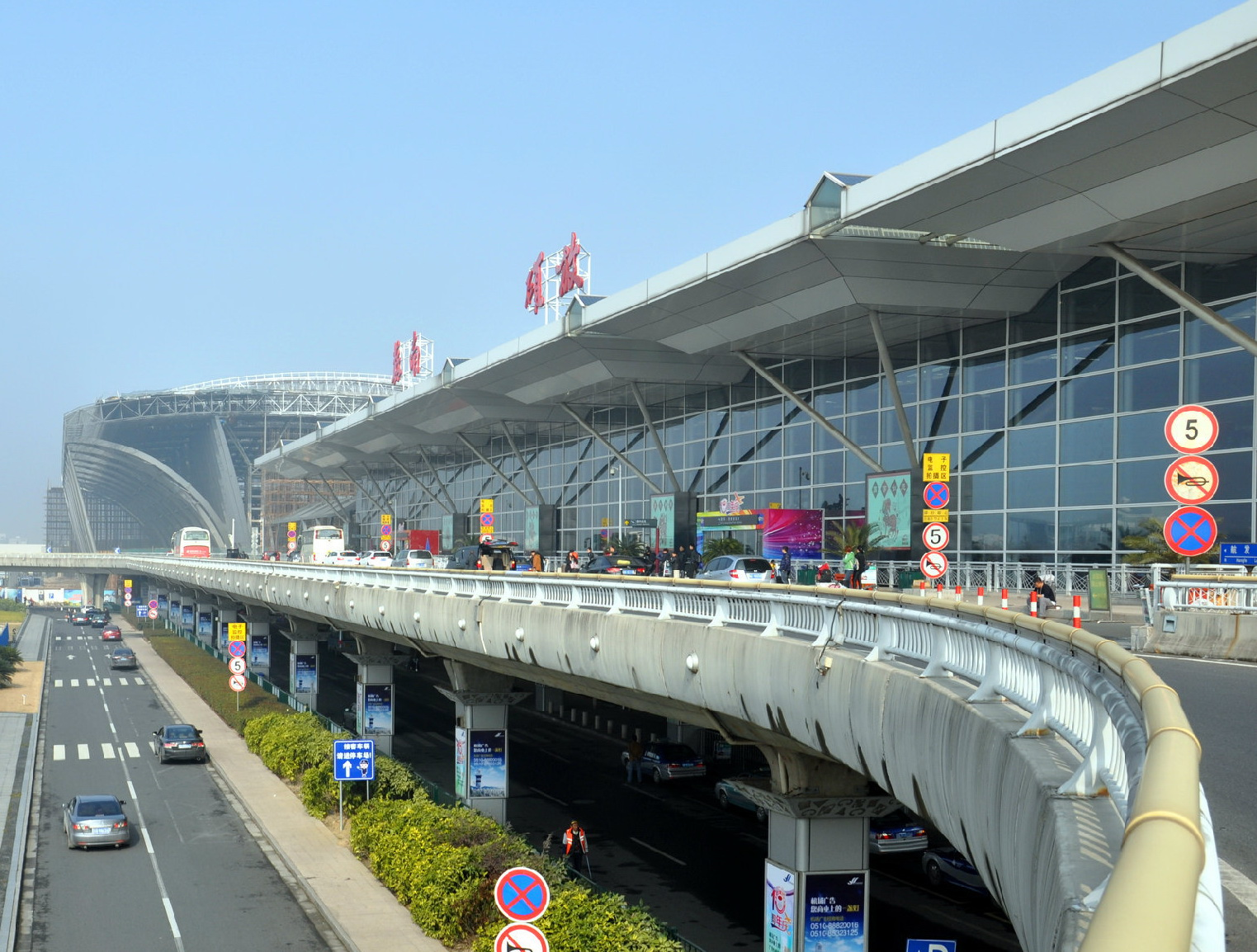
- IATA: WUX; ICAO: ZSWX

Summary
- Airport type: Public
- Owner/Operator: Sunan Shuofang International Airport Ltd.
- Serves: Wuxi; Shanghai; Suzhou
- Location: Shuofang, Xinwu, Wuxi, Jiangsu, China
- Opened: 18 February 2004; 22 years ago
- Hub for: Ruili Airlines
- Operating base for: China Eastern Airlines; Shenzhen Airlines
- Built: 1955; 71 years ago
- Elevation AMSL: 5 m (16 ft)
- Coordinates: 31°29′40″N 120°25′46″E
- Website: www.wuxiairport.com

Maps
- CAAC airport chart
- Location in Jiangsu WUX/ZSWX (China)

Runways
| Direction | Length | | Surface |
| Direction | m | ft | Surface |
|---|---|---|---|
| 03/21 | 3,200 | 10,499 | Asphalt |

Statistics (2025)
- Passengers: 10,967,778
- Cargo (metric tons): 196,706.1
- Aircraft movements: 82,730

Wuxi Shuofang Airport
- Simplified Chinese: 无锡硕放机场
- Traditional Chinese: 無錫碩放機場
Transcriptions
Standard Mandarin
- Hanyu Pinyin: Wúxī Shuòfàng Jīchǎng

Wuxi Shuofang Airport (called Wuxi Suzhou Airport from 17 March 2023) (IATA: WUX, ICAO: ZSWX) is an airport in the city of Wuxi, Jiangsu, China.

The Airport is the second largest airport in Jiangsu Province (after Nanjing Lukou International Airport) and the only profitable airport among the nine airports in Jiangsu Province outside Nanjing Airport. The airport covers an area of 3.24 square kilometers, currently has two terminals, 23 boarding gates (T1 Terminal 1-12, T2 Terminal 13-23), 26 parking stands (currently under construction), a 3,200-meter-long runway with 50-meter width, and an airport flight area grade of 4E.

In May 2023, the airport cargo hub station and part of the supporting second runway taxiway project officially started, which also marked the official start of the airport expansion.

== History ==
In July 2024, on the left is the cargo terminal under construction and part of the taxiway supporting the second runway.

The airport was built in 1955 for military use, and commercial flights only started in 2004 less than 2 years after the nearby Suzhou Guangfu Airport closed traffic to commercial flights.

In May 2023, the airport cargo hub station building and part of the supporting second runway taxiway project officially started, which also marked the official start of the airport expansion.

As of December 14, 2024, the airport served 10 million passengers annually for the first time, making it the second airport in Jiangsu Province with the annual passenger traffic of more than 10 million. The general revision plan of the airport, which includes the construction of a new second runway, the extension of the first runway, the construction of a new Terminal 3, and a comprehensive transportation hub, has been approved by the Civil Aviation Administration of China.

The airport has one runway designated 03/21 which measures 3,200 by 50 metres (10,499 ft × 164 ft).

In the future, Wuxi Shuofang Airport will have two runways and three terminals, T1, T2 and T3. By 2035, it will need to meet the passenger throughput of 21.5 million and cargo throughput of 650,000 tons. In the long term, it will meet the development plan goals of 25 million passenger throughput and 1.2 million tons of cargo throughput by 2050.

== Airlines and destinations ==
=== Passenger ===
| Airlines | Destinations |
|---|---|
| 9 Air | Chifeng, Guangzhou, Guiyang, Shenyang, Vientiane, Yingkou |
| Air Travel | Baoshan, Bazhong, Changchun, Changsha, Chengdu–Tianfu, Harbin, Hohhot, Kunming, Lijiang, Shenyang, Shiyan, Tongren, Xishuangbanna, Yibin, Zunyi–Xinzhou |
| China Eastern Airlines | Beijing–Daxing, Changsha, Chengdu–Tianfu, Chongqing, Guangzhou, Harbin, Jieyang, Kunming, Macau, Ordos, Qingdao, Sanya, Seoul–Incheon, Shenyang, Shenzhen, Taiyuan, Ürümqi, Xiamen, Xi'an |
| China Southern Airlines | Guangzhou, Shenzhen |
| Donghai Airlines | Haikou, Shenzhen, Shijiazhuang, Zhuhai |
| HK Express | Hong Kong |
| Juneyao Air | Changchun, Changzhi, Chengdu–Tianfu, Chongqing, Guilin, Haikou, Harbin, Huizhou, Jeju, Kuala Lumpur-International, Nanning, Qingdao, Sanya, Singapore, Xishuangbanna, Zhuhai |
| Loong Air | Dalian, Lijiang, Xiangyang |
| Lucky Air | Kunming |
| Ruili Airlines | Changsha, Chengdu–Tianfu, Guiyang, Kunming, Mangshi, Shenzhen, Sihanoukville |
| Shenzhen Airlines | Beijing–Capital, Chengdu–Tianfu, Chongqing, Guangzhou, Guiyang, Hong Kong, Huizhou, Lanzhou, Macau, Nanning, Osaka–Kansai, Quanzhou, Seoul–Incheon, Shenyang, Shenzhen, Taiyuan, Xi'an, Yuncheng, Zhuhai |
| Sichuan Airlines | Chengdu–Shuangliu, Chongqing |
| Thai VietJet Air | Bangkok–Suvarnabhumi |
| XiamenAir | Fuzhou |

=== Cargo ===
| Airlines | Destinations |
|---|---|
| Central Airlines | Seoul–Incheon, Shenzhen |
| Donghai Airlines | Beijing–Capital, Quanzhou, Shenzhen |
| SF Airlines | Shenzhen |
| DHL Air UK | East Midlands, Leipzig/Halle |
| Suparna Airlines Cargo | Hong Kong, Shanghai–Pudong |

=== Transport ===
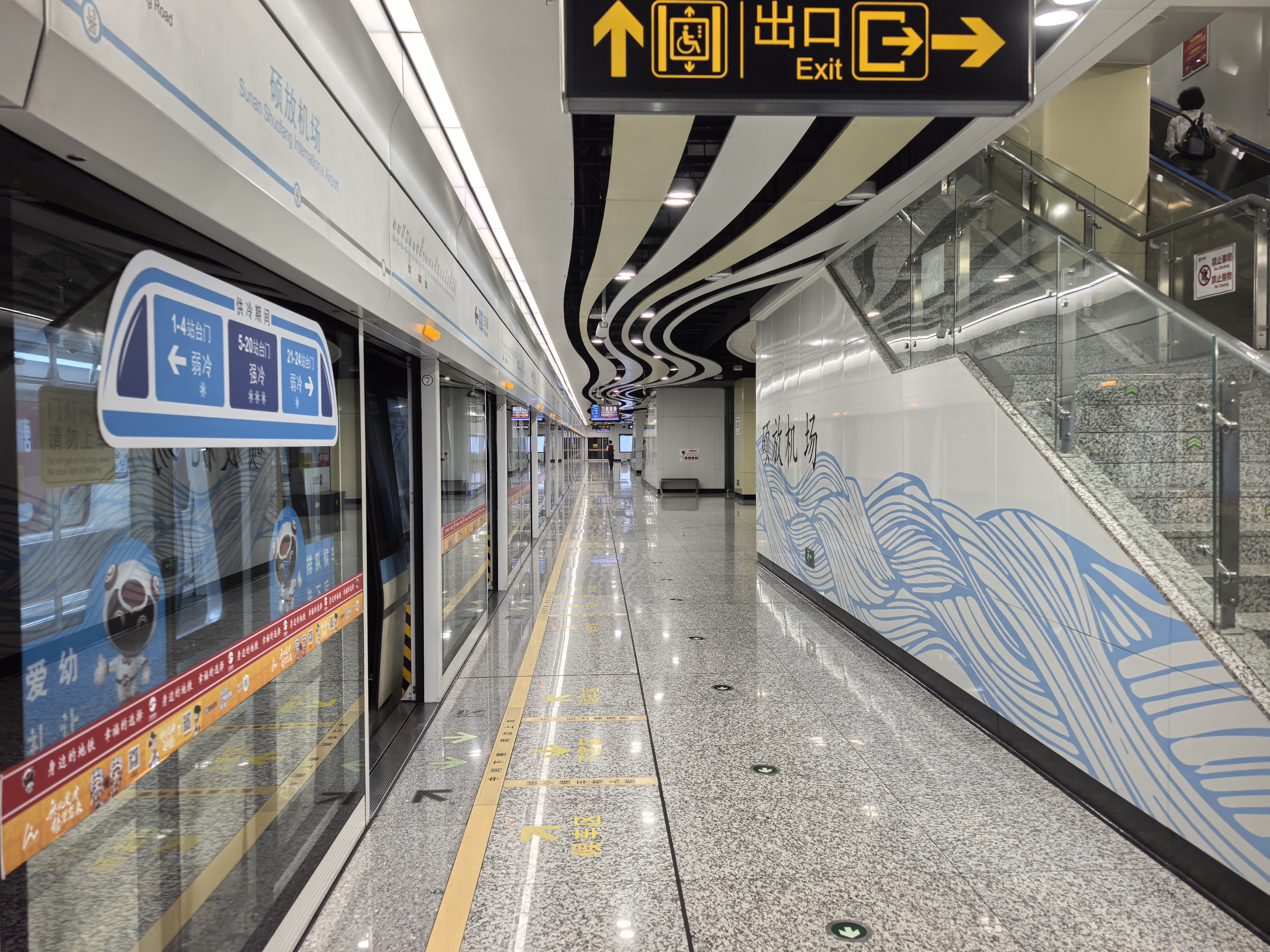
Platform of the metro station

The airport is served by Line 3 of the Wuxi Metro.

== See also ==
- List of airports in China
- List of the busiest airports in China
