= Donghai Airlines =

Chinese airline

Donghai Airlines 东海航空

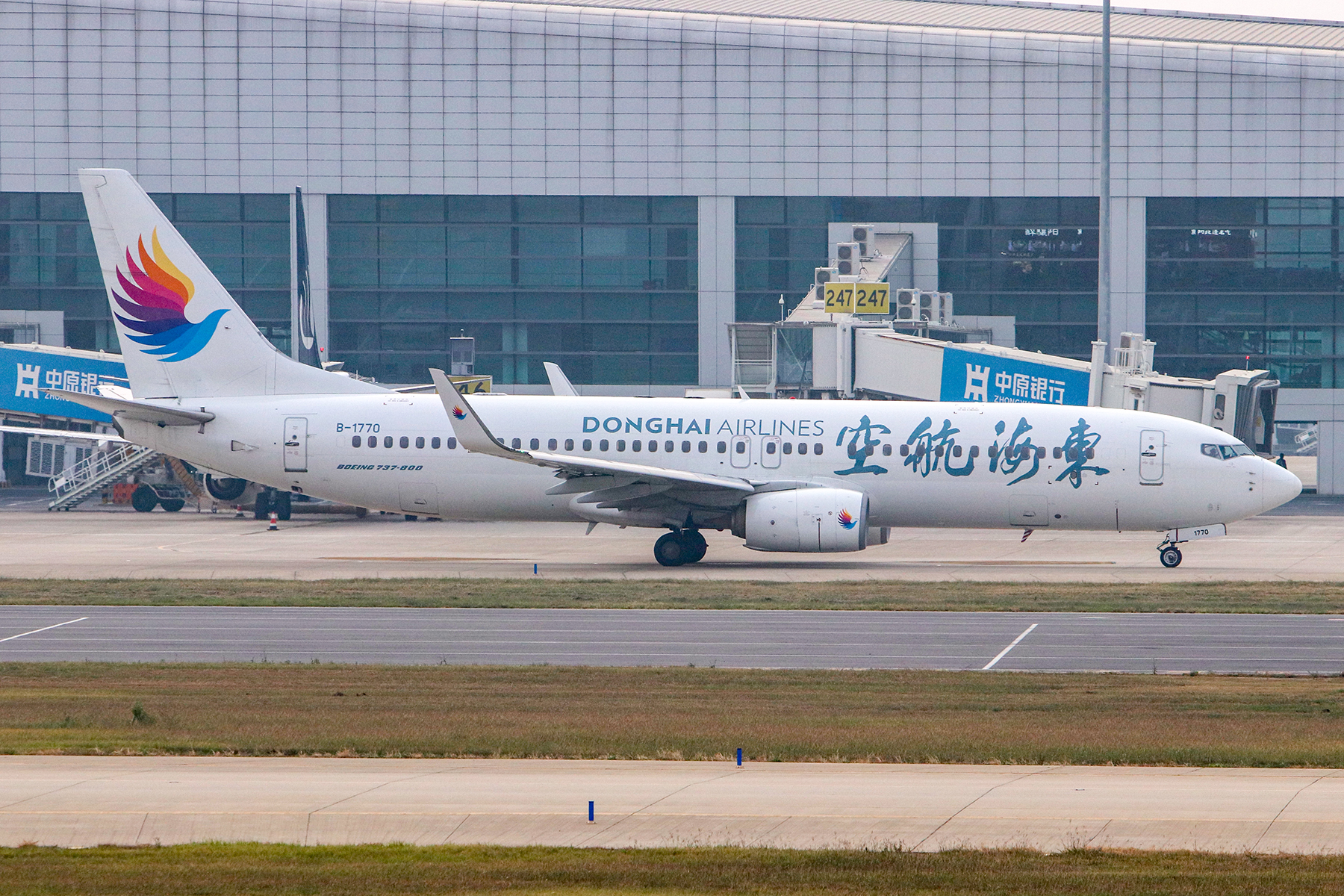
IATA	ICAO	Call sign
DZ	EPA	DONGHAI AIR
- Founded: 2002; 24 years ago
- Hubs: Shenzhen Bao'an International Airport
- Frequent-flyer program: Seagull Club
- Subsidiaries: Donghai Jet Co. Ltd. Greater Bay Airlines
- Fleet size: 21
- Destinations: 41
- Parent company: Sichuan Airlines, Shenzhen Donggang Trade, Donghai United Group and Yonggang
- Headquarters: Shenzhen Bao'an International Airport, Bao'an District, Shenzhen, Guangdong
- Key people: Bill Wong Cho-bau (chairman); Liu Jianping (CEO)
- Website: www.donghaiair.com

Donghai Airlines
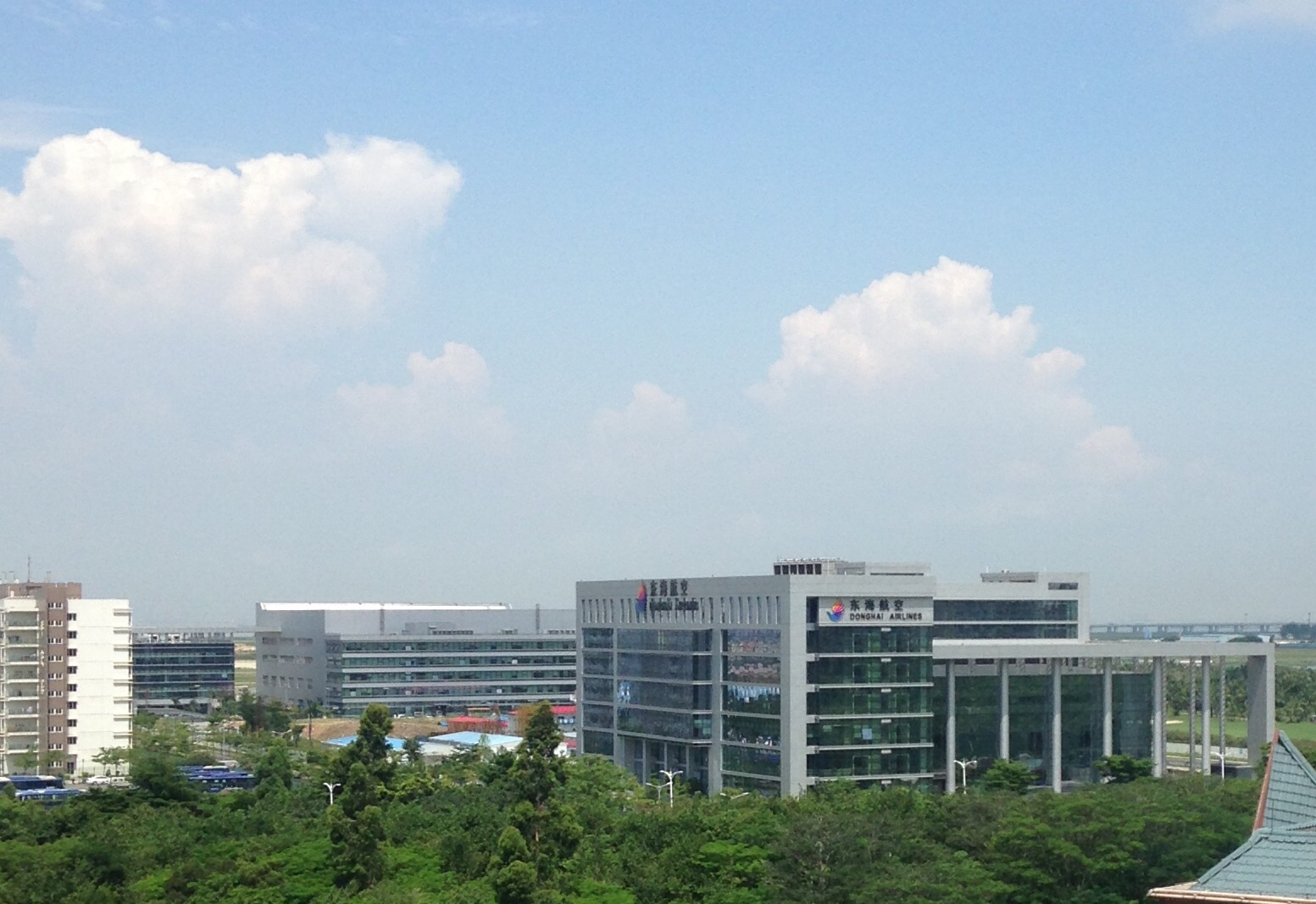
- Donghai Airlines headquarters in Shenzhen
- Simplified Chinese: 东海航空
- Traditional Chinese: 東海航空
Transcriptions
Standard Mandarin
- Hanyu Pinyin: Dōnghǎi Hángkōng
Yue: Cantonese
- Jyutping: dung^{1}hoi^{2} hong^{4}hung^{1}

Donghai Airlines is an airline headquartered in Shenzhen, Guangdong, with its base at Shenzhen Bao'an International Airport.

== History ==
The company was started in November 2002 as Jetwin Cargo Airline, with 2005 being the originally anticipated launch date for flight operations, using Boeing 737 aircraft. Initially, it was owned by Orient Holdings Group (65% ownership) and (Hong Kong company) East Pacific Holdings (35% ownership).

By 2006, the airline still had not become operational, and its name changed to East Pacific Airlines. By then, the company's ownership was as follows: Shenzhen Donggang Trade (51%), Donghai United Group (25%) and Yonggang (24%), and it expected to begin service in August 2006, subject to gaining approval from Chinese aviation authorities. Delivery of its first freighter aircraft, three Boeing 737-300 converted passenger planes, occurred in September 2006.

In 2010, Donghai Jet Co. Ltd. ordered five Challenger jets from Bombardier Aerospace for business jet service. Its received its first Canadair CL-600 business jet on 13 November 2010.

In 2015, the airline announced plans for a major increase in its operations, including the beginning of international and long-haul flights between 2020 and 2023 and to have 120 aircraft by 2025, including Boeing 787 Dreamliners and additional Boeing 737-800 and Boeing 737 MAX aircraft.

== Destinations ==
Country	City	Airport	Notes	Refs
Australia	Darwin	Darwin International Airport	Terminated	
China	Baotou	Baotou Donghe International Airport	Terminated	
China	Beijing	Beijing Capital International Airport	Terminated	
China	Beijing	Beijing Daxing International Airport		
China	Bengbu	Bengbu Tenghu Airport		
China	Changchun	Changchun Longjia International Airport		
China	Changsha	Changsha Huanghua International Airport		
China	Chengdu	Chengdu Shuangliu International Airport	Terminated	
China	Chengdu	Chengdu Tianfu International Airport		
China	Chongqing	Chongqing Jiangbei International Airport		
China	Dalian	Dalian Zhoushuizi International Airport		
China	Datong	Datong Yungang International Airport		
China	Dongying	Dongying Shengli Airport	Terminated	
China	Guilin	Guilin Liangjiang International Airport		
China	Guiyang	Guiyang Longdongbao International Airport	Terminated	
China	Haikou	Haikou Meilan International Airport		
China	Handan	Handan Airport	Terminated	
China	Hangzhou	Hangzhou Xiaoshan International Airport		
China	Harbin	Harbin Taiping International Airport		
China	Huaihua	Huaihua Zhijiang Airport	Terminated	
China	Jining	Jining Da'an Airport	Terminated	
China	Kunming	Kunming Changshui International Airport		
China	Lanzhou	Lanzhou Zhongchuan International Airport		
China	Lianyungang	Lianyungang Huaguoshan International Airport		
China	Lishui	Lishui Airport		
China	Nanchang	Nanchang Changbei International Airport		
China	Nanjing	Nanjing Lukou International Airport		
China	Nantong	Nantong Xingdong Airport		
China	Nanyang	Nanyang Jiangying Airport	Terminated	
China	Qingyang	Qingyang Airport		
China	Quanzhou	Quanzhou Jinjiang International Airport		
China	Shanghai	Shanghai Pudong International Airport		
China	Shenyang	Shenyang Taoxian International Airport		
China	Shenzhen	Shenzhen Bao'an International Airport	Hub	
China	Shiyan	Shiyan Wudangshan Airport		
China	Tianjin	Tianjin Binhai International Airport		
China	Wenzhou	Wenzhou Longwan International Airport		
China	Wuxi	Sunan Shuofang International Airport		
China	Xi'an	Xi'an Xianyang International Airport		
China	Xingyi	Xingyi Wanfenglin Airport	Terminated	
China	Yichang	Yichang Sanxia Airport		
China	Yinchuan	Yinchuan Hedong International Airport		
China	Yiwu	Yiwu Airport		
China	Zhengzhou	Zhengzhou Xinzheng International Airport		
China	Zhoushan	Zhoushan Putuoshan International Airport		
China	Zhuhai	Zhuhai Jinwan Airport		
Laos	Vientiane	Wattay International Airport		
Myanmar	Mandalay	Mandalay International Airport	Terminated	
Myanmar	Nay Pyi Taw	Naypyidaw International Airport	Terminated	
South Korea	Jeju	Jeju International Airport		
Thailand	Rayong	U-Tapao International Airport	Terminated	
Thailand	Chiang Rai	Chiang Rai International Airport	Terminated	
Vietnam	Haiphong	Cat Bi International Airport	Terminated	
Vietnam	Nha Trang	Cam Ranh International Airport		
Vietnam	Van Don	Van Don International Airport	Terminated	

=== Interline agreements ===
- Hahn Air

== Fleet ==
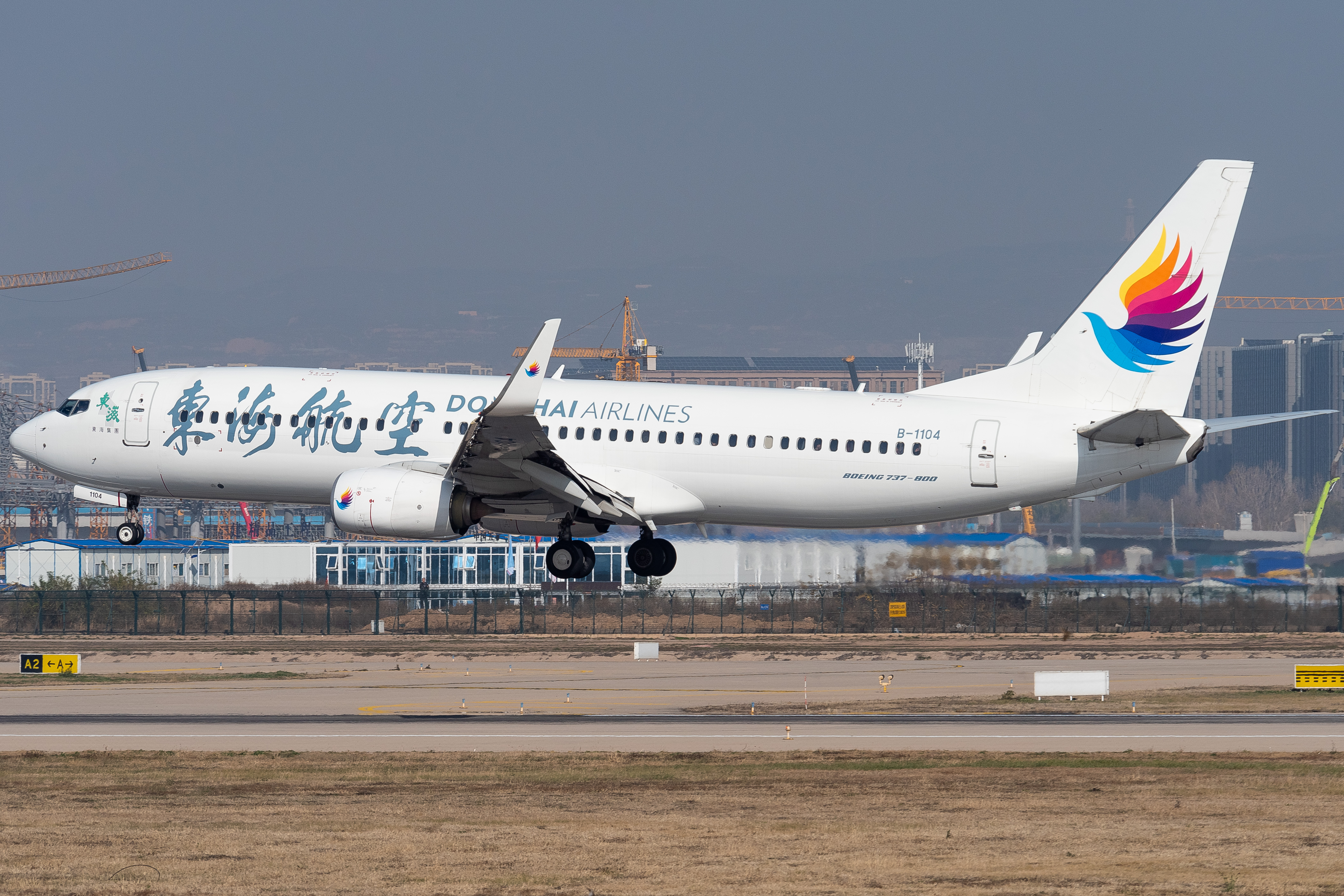
A Donghai Airlines Boeing 737-800 landing at Taiyuan Wusu International Airport, in 2nd generation livery

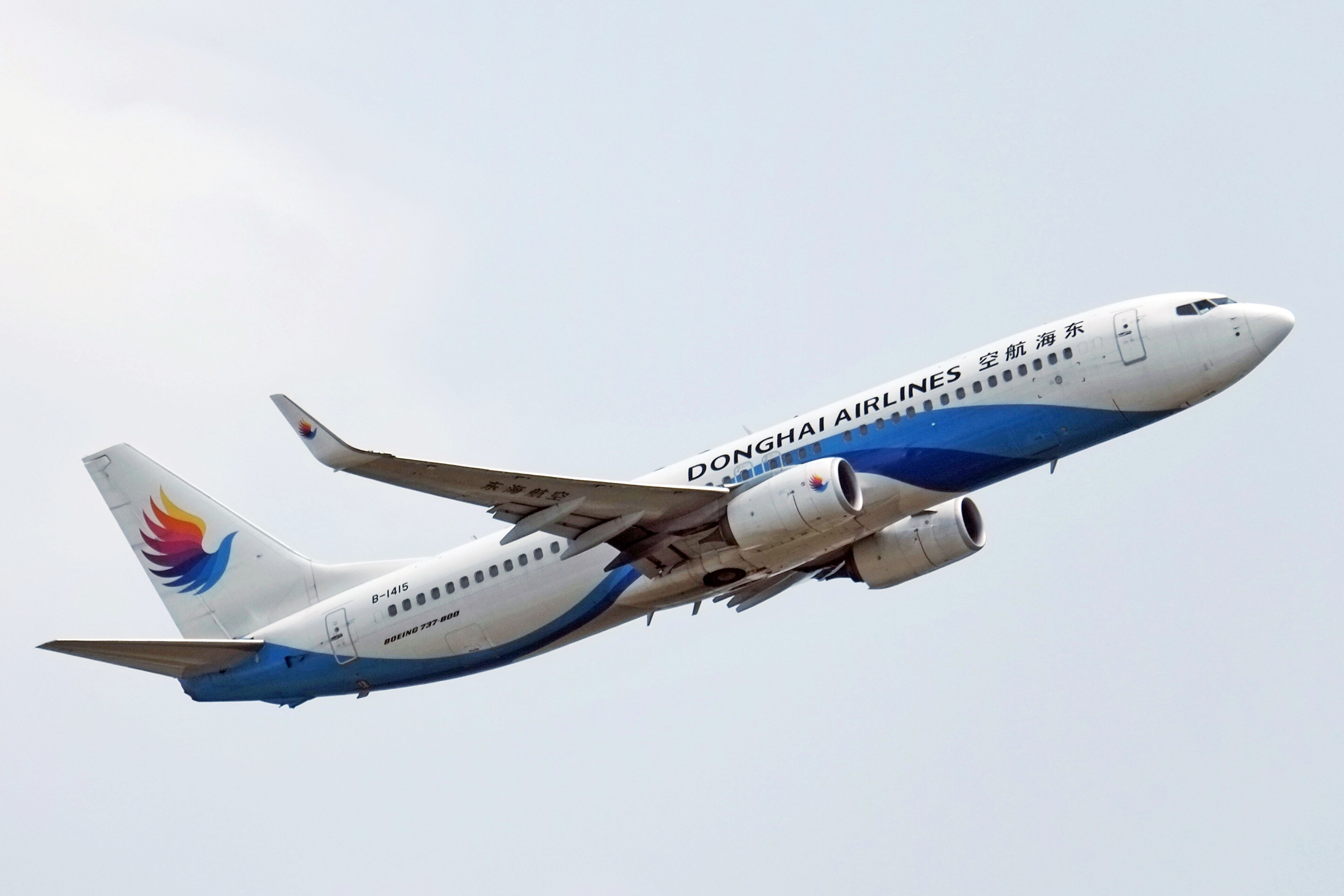
A Donghai Airlines Boeing 737-800 in 1st generation livery

=== Current fleet ===
As of August 2025, Donghai Airlines operates an all-Boeing fleet including the following aircraft:

Donghai Airlines fleet
Aircraft	In service	Orders	Passengers			Notes
Aircraft	In service	Orders	C	Y	Total	Notes
Boeing 737-800	19	—	8	159	167	
Boeing 737 MAX 8	2	23	TBA			Delivery will resume in early 2024
Boeing 787-9	—	5	TBA			
Total	21	28				

=== Former fleet ===
The airline previously operated 8 737-300F between September 2006 and August 2016.
