= Jingdezhen Luojia Airport =

Jingdezhen Luojia Airport 景德镇罗家机场
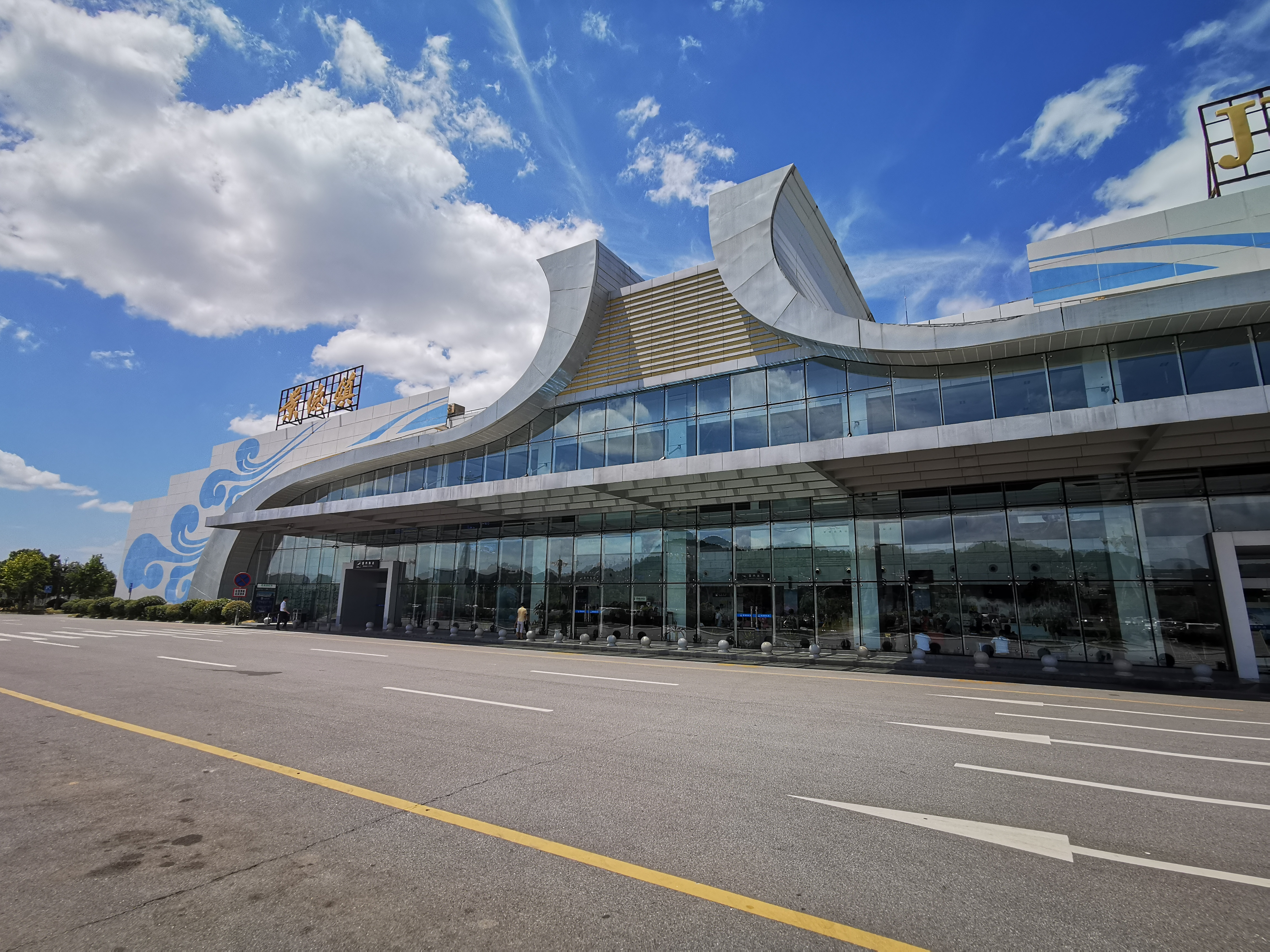
- IATA: JDZ; ICAO: ZSJD

Summary
- Location: Jingdezhen, Jiangxi, China
- Elevation AMSL: 34 m (112 ft)
- Coordinates: 29°20′19″N 117°10′33″E

Map
- Location of airport in Jiangxi

Runways
Direction	Length		Surface
Direction	m	ft	Surface
04/22	2,400	7,874	Concrete

Statistics (2025)
- Passengers: 331,426
- Aircraft movements: 3,290
- Cargo (metric tons): 174.7

Jingdezhen Luojia Airport
- Simplified Chinese: 景德镇罗家机场
- Traditional Chinese: 景德鎮羅家機場
Transcriptions
Standard Mandarin
- Hanyu Pinyin: Jǐngdézhèn Luōjiā Jīchǎng

Jingdezhen Luojia Airport (IATA: JDZ, ICAO: ZSJD) is an airport serving Jingdezhen, a city in the province of Jiangxi in the People's Republic of China.

== History ==
Construction of Jingdezhen Luojia Airport began in November 1959, and at that time the flight zone was classified as Level 1B. In 1960, the Jingdezhen Station of the Civil Aviation Administration of China, responsible for the operation and management of Jingdezhen Airport, was established, and flights between Jingdezhen and Nanchang were launched. The airport officially began operation in September, 1960.

In 1987, the airport was forced to cease operations because it did not meet industry standards.

Five years later, in September 1992, in order to meet the needs of economic development, the Jingdezhen Municipal People's Government invested in acquiring 1,710.06 acres of nearby land for the first phase of the expansion project of Jingdezhen Luojia Airport.

The airport imported and installed advanced communication and navigation equipment from abroad. On September 10, 1996, Jingdezhen Luojia Airport, which had been closed for nine years, resumed operations. China Eastern Airlines used Fokker FK-100 aircraft to operate the Shanghai route, and the airport's flight area rating was changed to 4C.

On December 7, 2008, the groundbreaking ceremony for the new terminal building was held at Jingdezhen Luojia Airport. The project was budgeted for a total investment of 141.11 million yuan. After completion, the project would be able to meet the needs of 600,000 passengers, 20 tons of cargo, and 6,593 aircraft movements per year.

In 2010, the new terminal building of Jingdezhen Airport was put into use.

On June 28, 2021, the airport upgrade project was launched, with a total investment of nearly 120 million yuan. The project included the construction of one vertical connecting taxiway, a five-stand (Category C) apron, one boarding corridor, and ETC facilities. Upon completion, Jingdezhen Airport would become an important hub airport in North-eastern Jiangxi Province, handling 1.3 million passengers, 1,300 tons of cargo annually, and 12,380 flight movements per year. On October 21, the preliminary design and budget estimate for the project were jointly approved by the East China Regional Administration of the Civil Aviation Administration of China and the Jiangxi Provincial Development and Reform Commission.

On December 28, 2023, the airport upgrade project passed the final acceptance inspection. The project was officially put into use on January 22, 2026.

In 2025, the airport's actual passenger throughput was 331,426 and the actual number of aircraft movements was 3,290, both of which were only about half of the targets set in 2008.

== Facilities ==
The airport is at an elevation of 112 feet (34 m) above mean sea level and has one runway which is 2,400 metres (7,874 ft) long.

== Airlines and destinations ==
Airlines	Destinations
Air Changan	Ningbo, Xi'an
Air China	Beijing–Capital, Beijing–Daxing
China United Airlines	Chengdu-Tianfu
Shandong Airlines	Chengdu–Tianfu, Kunming, Qingdao, Xiamen
Shenzhen Airlines	Guangzhou, Shanghai–Hongqiao, Shenzhen

== See also ==
- List of airports in the People's Republic of China
