= Nantong Xingdong International Airport =

Airport serving Nantong, Jiangsu, China

Nantong Xingdong International Airport 南通兴东国际机场
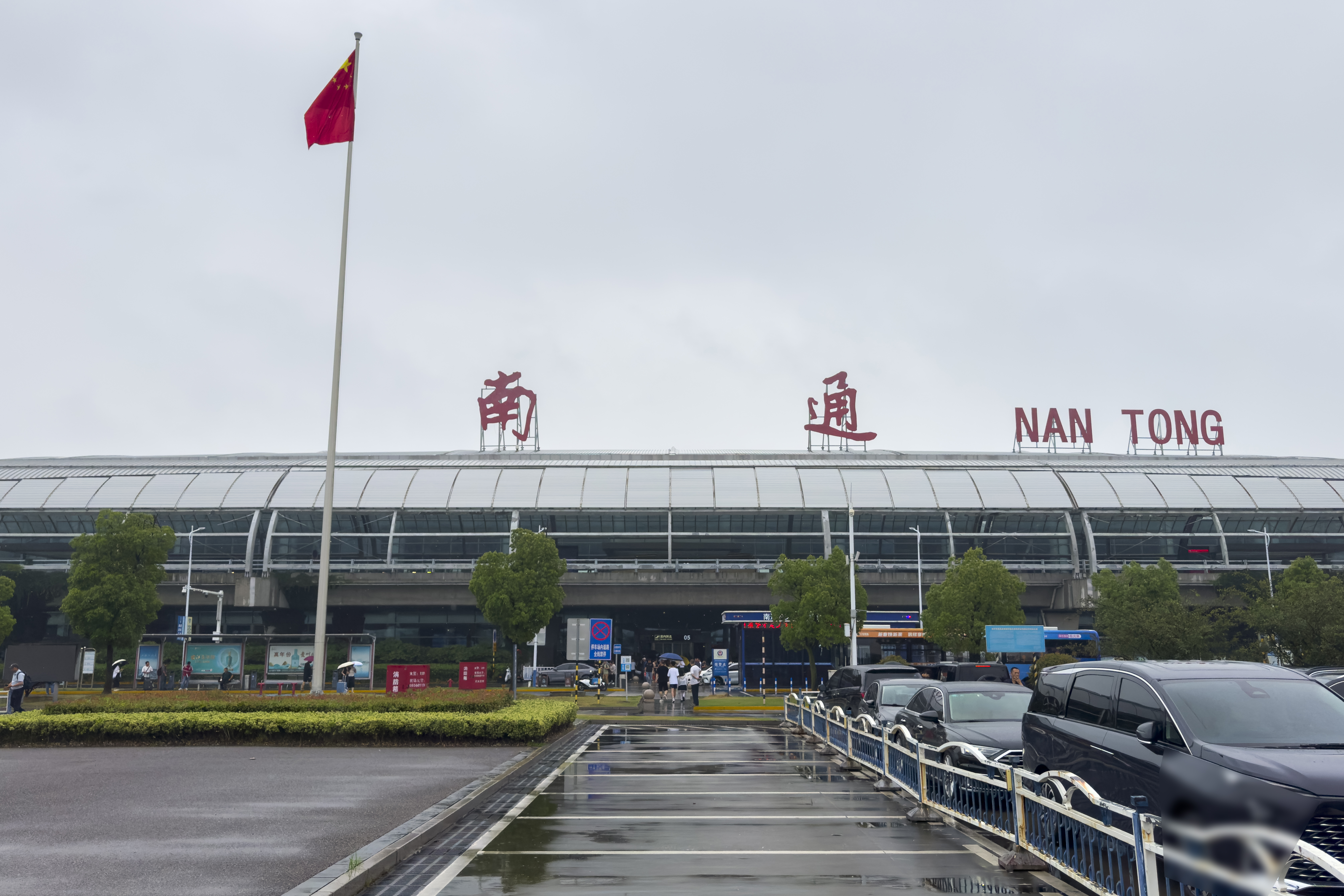
- Terminal 3
- IATA: NTG; ICAO: ZSNT

Summary
- Airport type: Public
- Serves: Nantong
- Location: Xingdong Subdistrict, Tongzhou, Nantong, Jiangsu, China
- Opened: 24 August 1993; 33 years ago
- Elevation AMSL: 16 ft (4.9 m)
- Coordinates: 32°04′15″N 120°58′32″E
- Website: www.ntcaac.com

Map
- Location in Jiangsu NTG/ZSNT (China)

Runways
Direction	Length		Surface
Direction	m	ft	Surface
18/36	3,400	11,155	concrete

Statistics (2023)
- Passengers: 3,659,099
- Aircraft movements: 37,376
- Cargo (metric tons): 60,228.1
- Source: CAAC

Nantong Xingdong International Airport
- Simplified Chinese: 南通兴东国际机场
- Traditional Chinese: 南通興東國際機場
Transcriptions
Standard Mandarin
- Hanyu Pinyin: Nántōng Xìngdōng Guójì Jīchǎng

Nantong Xingdong International Airport (IATA: NTG, ICAO: ZSNT) is an international airport serving the city of Nantong in East China's Jiangsu province. It is located in the town of Xingdong in Tongzhou District, 9.8 kilometres (6.1 mi) northeast of Nantong and 120 km (75 mi) from Shanghai. Construction started in 1990 and flights commenced in 1993. In 2016 the airport handled 1,538,158 passengers and 35,371.1 tons of cargo.

== Facilities ==
The airport has one runway which is 3,400 metres (11,155 ft) long.

== Airlines and destinations ==
=== Passenger ===
Airlines	Destinations
9 Air	Guiyang
Air China	Beijing–Capital, Beijing–Daxing, Chengdu–Tianfu
China Eastern Airlines	Nanchang
China Southern Airlines	Guangzhou, Jieyang
Donghai Airlines	Changchun, Changsha, Chengdu–Tianfu, Chongqing, Guiyang, Haikou, Hohhot, Quanzhou, Sanya, Shenzhen, Tianjin, Xishuangbanna, Yichang, Zhengzhou, Zhuhai
Hebei Airlines	Shijiazhuang
Kunming Airlines	Kunming
Shenzhen Airlines	Beijing–Capital, Changchun, Chengdu–Tianfu, Chongqing, Dalian, Guangzhou, Guiyang, Harbin, Hong Kong, Jieyang, Macau, Nanning, Quanzhou, Sanya, Shenyang, Shenzhen, Taiyuan, Tianjin, Xiamen, Xi'an, Yantai, Zhuhai
Sichuan Airlines	Changsha, Chengdu–Tianfu
Tianjin Airlines	Dalian, Hanzhong, Wuhan, Yulin (Shaanxi)
Tibet Airlines	Lhasa, Xi'an
XiamenAir	Changchun, Changsha, Fuzhou, Harbin

== See also ==
- List of airports in the People's Republic of China
