= Air Travel (airline) =

Chinese airline

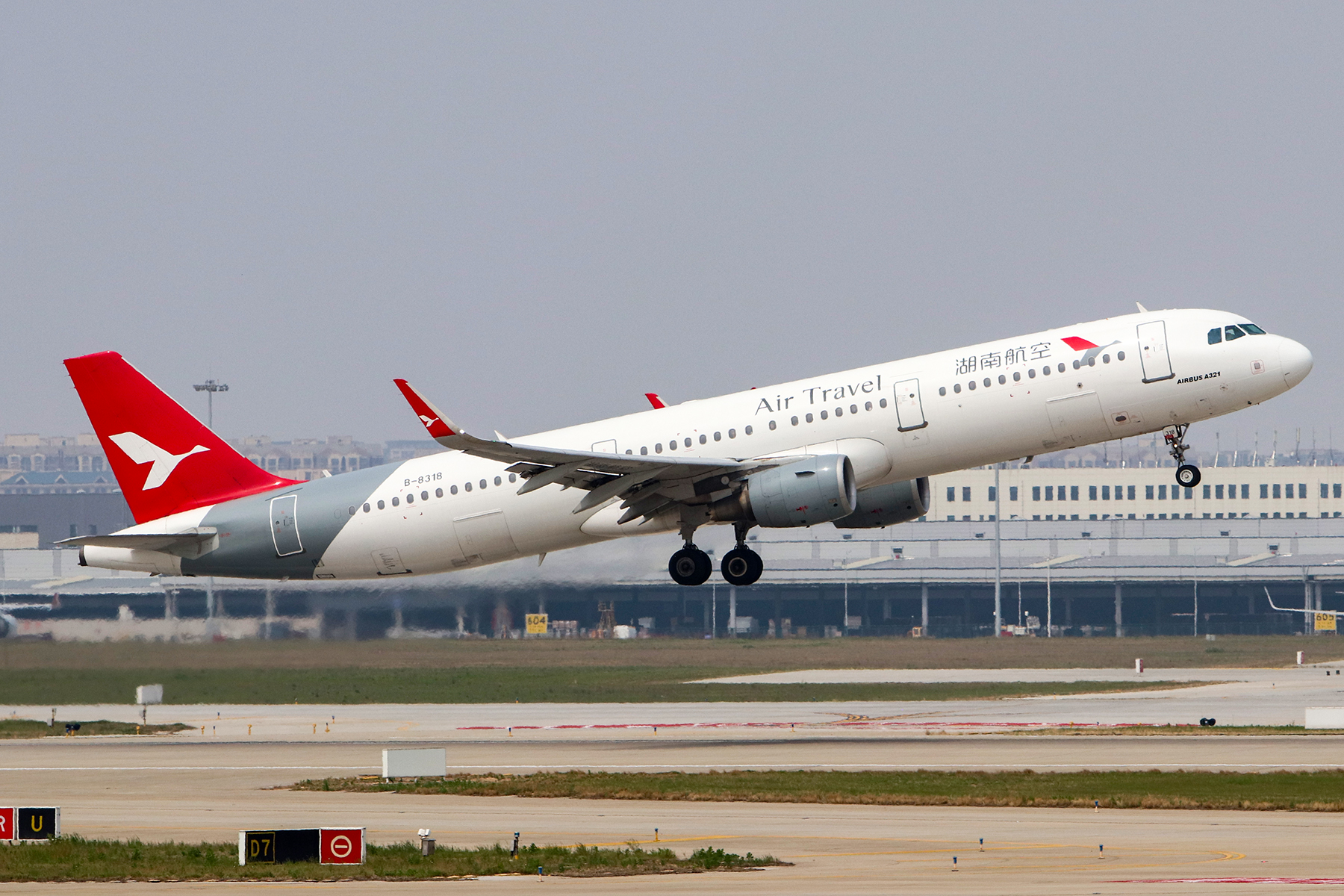
- Air Travel Airbus A321-211
IATA	ICAO	Call sign
A6	OTC	AIR TRAVEL
- Founded: 16 April 2014; 12 years ago (as Hongtu Airlines)
- Commenced operations: 21 May 2016; 10 years ago
- Operating bases: Changsha; Kunming; Nanjing; Wuxi
- Fleet size: 16
- Destinations: 7 (August 2017)
- Headquarters: Changsha, Hunan, China
- Key people: Tang Longcheng, chairman
- Website: www.a6air.com

Air Travel
- Traditional Chinese: 湖南航空股份公司
- Simplified Chinese: 湖南航空股份公司
Transcriptions
Standard Mandarin
- Hanyu Pinyin: Húnán hángkōng gǔfèn gōngsī

Hongtu Airlines
- Traditional Chinese: 紅土航空
- Simplified Chinese: 红土航空
Transcriptions
Standard Mandarin
- Hanyu Pinyin: Hóngtǔ Hángkōng

Air Travel (Chinese: 湖南航空; lit. 'Hunan Airlines') is a Chinese airline operating domestic flights from its hub at Changsha Huanghua International Airport in Hunan Province. The airline launched operations in May 2016 as Hongtu Airlines and rebranded its English name to "Air Travel" in 2018. The airline moved to Hunan from Yunnan in 2020.

== History ==
Air Travel, originally named Hongtu Airlines, received preliminary approval from the Civil Aviation Administration of China (CAAC) on 26 March 2015. In October 2015, the airline's livery was revealed. The red color represents the famous red earth of Dongchuan District in Yunnan Province; in fact, Hongtu in the airline's name, is a transliteration of Chinese: 红土; lit. 'red soil'.

On 22 December 2015, Hongtu Airlines took delivery of its first aircraft, an Airbus A321 originally destined for UTair Aviation. The aircraft is named Dai after the Dai people, an ethnic minority in Yunnan Province. Hongtu Airlines held an inauguration ceremony on 20 May 2016 and began flights the following day, with the inaugural flight operating between Kunming and Nanchang.

The airline underwent a branding change in 2018: its English name became Air Travel, whilst retaining the name 红土航空; 'red soil airline' in Chinese. The company then changed its local name to Hunan Airlines (湖南航空公司) in 2021 following its move to Hunan Province, but retained the name 'Air Travel' in English.

== Corporate affairs ==
Hongtu Airlines is headquartered near Changsha Huanghua International Airport. The airline is a joint venture between Kunming Evergreen Financing (30%); local entrepreneur Tang Longcheng (20%); and five other companies, each holding 10%. The parties have invested a total of CNY600 million (USD96.6 million) in the airline.

== Destinations ==
As of December 2017, Hongtu Airlines flies to the following destinations in China:

Province	City	Airport	Notes
Gansu	Lanzhou	Lanzhou Zhongchuan International Airport	
Guangdong	Zhuhai	Zhuhai Jinwan Airport	
Guangxi	Guilin	Guilin Liangjiang International Airport	
Guangxi	Nanning	Nanning Wuxu International Airport	
Inner Mongolia	Hailar	Hulunbuir Hailar Airport	
Inner Mongolia	Hohhot	Hohhot Baita International Airport	
Jiangsu	Nanjing	Nanjing Lukou International Airport	Base
Jiangsu	Wuxi	Sunan Shuofang International Airport	Base
Jiangsu	Nantong	Nantong Xingdong Airport	
Jiangxi	Nanchang	Nanchang Changbei International Airport	
Jilin	Changchun	Changchun Longjia International Airport	
Henan	Zhengzhou	Zhengzhou Xinzheng International Airport	
Liaoning	Shenyang	Shenyang Taoxian International Airport	
Qinghai	Xining	Xining Caojiabao International Airport	
Shandong	Qingdao	Qingdao Liuting International Airport	
Shandong	Yantai	Yantai Penglai International Airport	
Yunnan	Baoshan	Baoshan Yunrui Airport	
Yunnan	Cangyuan	Cangyuan Washan Airport	
Yunnan	Kunming	Kunming Changshui International Airport	Base
Yunnan	Lijiang	Lijiang Sanyi International Airport	
Zhejiang	Wenzhou	Wenzhou Longwan International Airport	
Hunan	Changsha	Changsha Huanghua International Airport	Base
Jilin	Baishan	Changbaishan Airport	
Inner Mongolia	Hulunbuir	Hulunbuir Hailar Airport	

== Fleet ==
The Hongtu Airlines fleet consists of the following aircraft as of December 2025:

Air Travel fleet
Aircraft	In Service	Orders	Passengers				Notes
Aircraft	In Service	Orders	J	Y+	Y	Total	Notes
Airbus A320-200	5	—	8	6	156	170	
