= Jinan Yaoqiang International Airport =

Airport serving Jinan, Shandong, China

Jinan Yaoqiang International Airport 济南遥墙国际机场
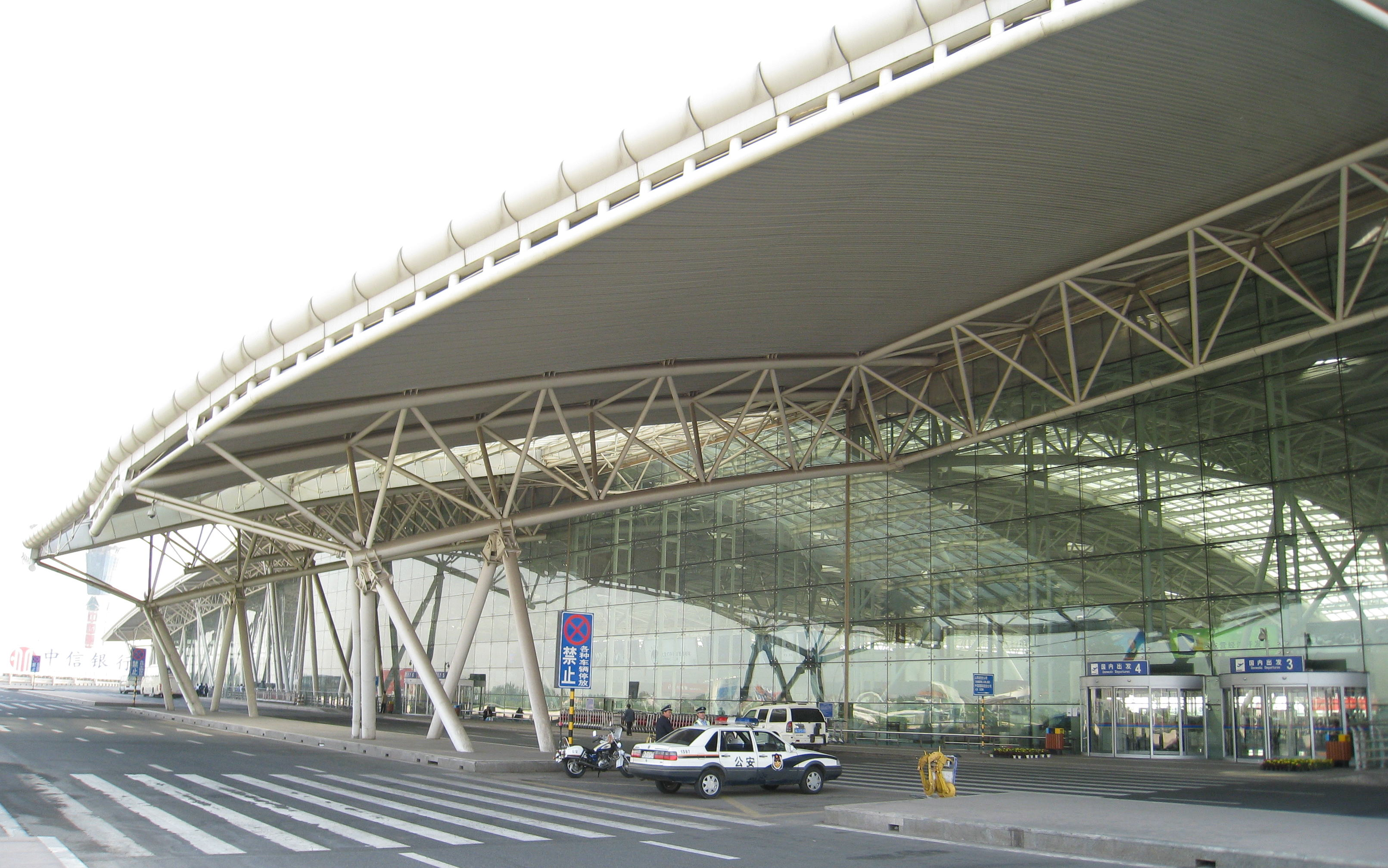
- Outside the terminal in 2009
- IATA: TNA; ICAO: ZSJN

Summary
- Airport type: Public
- Serves: Jinan
- Location: Yaoqiang, Licheng, Jinan, Shandong, China
- Opened: 26 July 1992; 34 years ago
- Hub for: Shandong Airlines; China Eastern Airlines; GX Airlines
- Elevation AMSL: 23 m (75 ft)
- Coordinates: 36°51′26″N 117°12′58″E

Maps
- CAAC airport chart
- Location in Shandong Location in China

Runways
| Direction | Length | | Surface |
| Direction | m | ft | Surface |
|---|---|---|---|
| 01/19 | 3,601 | 11,814 | Concrete |

Statistics (2025)
- Passengers: 20,329,972
- Cargo: 173,706.3 tons
- Aircraft movements: 145,034
- Source: Civil Aviation Administration of China2025

Jinan Yaoqiang International Airport
- Simplified Chinese: 济南遥墙国际机场
- Traditional Chinese: 濟南遙牆國際機場
Transcriptions
Standard Mandarin
- Hanyu Pinyin: Jǐnán Yáoqiáng Guójì Jīchǎng

Jinan Yaoqiang International Airport (IATA: TNA, ICAO: ZSJN) is an airport serving Jinan, the capital of East China's Shandong province. It is located approximately 33 km (21 mi) northeast of the city center and immediately to the north of the Yaoqiang Subdistrict (遥墙街道), after which the airport is named. By road, the airport is connected to the Jinan Ring (济南绕城高速公路), Beijing–Shanghai, and Qingdao–Yinchuan Expressways.

Jinan Yaoqiang International Airport was completed and opened to traffic on 26 July 1992, replacing the former Jinan Zhangzhuang Airport, and the expansion project of the airfield was completed in October 2000. The new terminal opened in March 2005, while the South Finger Gallery project of the terminal was launched in 2010.

According to the official website information of the airport in September 2017, Jinan Yaoqiang International Airport covers an area of 7200 acres, with a total terminal building area of 114000 square meters, including 30000 square meters of the south corridor area, which can ensure an annual passenger throughput of 12 million people, 4500 people during peak hours, and the demand for 100000 aircraft takeoffs and landings. The apron covers an area of 440000 square meters and has 24 boarding bridges. As of the end of 2016, the airport had over 140 air routes.

In December 2016, Sichuan Airlines began non-stop intercontinental service from Jinan to Los Angeles.

In 2025, Jinan Yaoqiang International Airport was the 25th busiest airport in China, with 20,329,972 passengers.

In February 2022, Jinan gained direct flights to Europe with Condor, starting with Frankfurt. Nearly one year later, in January 2023, Condor ceased the service again and started flying to Hefei.

== Historical evolution ==
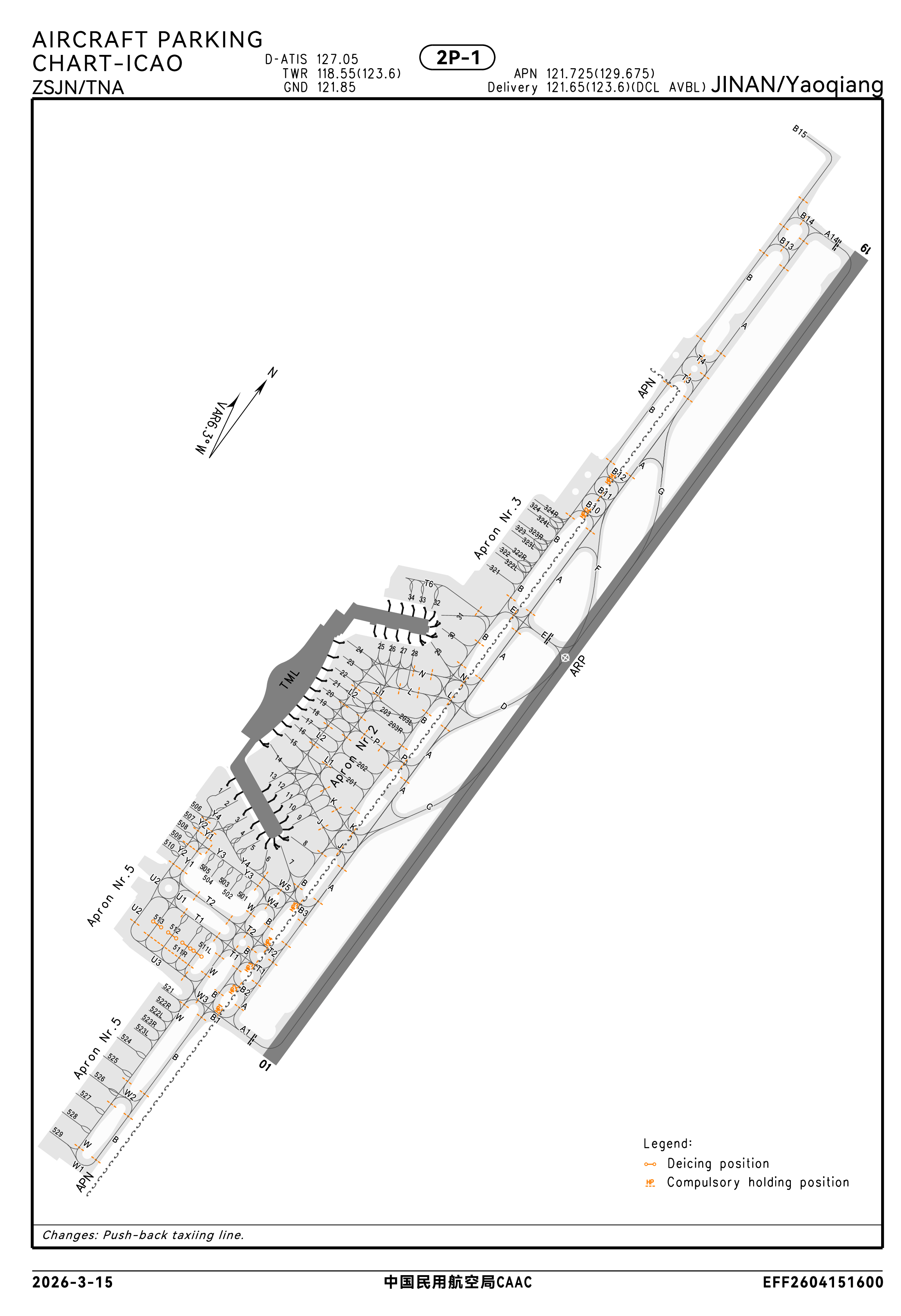
Aircraft parking chart

On 28 March 1985, in order to adapt the civil aviation industry of Shandong Province to the economic development and opening-up needs of Shandong Province and the provincial capital Jinan, the People's Government of Shandong Province submitted a report to the State Council and the Central Military Commission on the construction of Jinan Xiangwangdian Civil Airport. On 11 August of the same year, a supplementary report on the construction of Jinan Civil Aviation Airport was issued.

On 15 November 1990, groundbreaking began at the airport.

On 26 July 1992, the airport was officially opened for navigation, replacing the now-closed Jinan Zhangzhuang Airport. On 17 December 1997, after being reviewed by the Civil Aviation Administration of China, its flight zone level was determined to be 4D.

In 2003, the expansion project of the terminal area was launched with an investment of 1.6 billion yuan, covering an area of 1300 acres.

On 28 March 2005, the terminal area expansion project was put into operation, including the new terminal building and apron projects. The project adopted 2010 as its target year and was designed to handle 8 million passengers annually, including 3,200 during peak hours. The newly constructed terminal building is 465 meters long from north to south, with a width of 120 to 50 meters and a maximum roof height of 32.8 meters. The total floor area is 80,000 square meters. The original terminal building was converted into a 14,000-square-meter cargo facility.

In March 2012, construction of the south concourse (south finger pier) began, with a total investment of approximately 735 million yuan, and an additional 480 acres of development land.

On 30 December 2015, the south concourse project was put into use. The newly opened concourse is located on the south side of the current terminal. It covers 29,400 square meters, consisting of the connecting corridor to the main terminal and the passenger concourse. The corridor is 127 meters long and 25 meters wide; the concourse is 300 meters long and 36 meters wide. The expansion also included 155,000 square meters of new apron, 13 additional boarding bridges (including two dual-end movable bridges), and new transfer and VIP security checkpoints. The terminal’s weak-current and security systems were upgraded as well. After the south concourse opened, the total terminal area reached 114,000 square meters, with 24 boarding bridges, supporting an annual throughput of 12 million passengers, 100,000 tons of cargo and mail, and 100,000 aircraft movements.

In February 2017, the Jinan Urban and Rural Construction Committee website released a bid announcement for the North Concourse Expansion of Jinan Yaoqiang International Airport. The north concourse, designed as an international concourse with transfer and connecting-flight functions, has a planned area of 54,700 square meters and will include 12 boarding bridges. The project also involves modifying parts of the existing taxiway facilities and building a temporary 60,000-square-meter parking area, including a 30,216-square-meter public parking lot and a 30,528-square-meter taxi holding area. Construction of the north concourse began in July 2017 and is expected to be completed in 2020, enabling Jinan Airport to meet the projected 18.23 million passengers by 2022.

On 28 September 2017, construction began on the second parallel taxiway and supporting apron project. With an investment of approximately 310 million yuan and a total construction period of 480 days, the project includes building a second parallel taxiway east of the main runway, expanding the existing apron, and constructing service roads. After completion, 11 new aircraft stands will be added, significantly improving runway efficiency, reducing aircraft waiting times, and enhancing overall operational capacity.

In October 2018, the airport's overnight passenger accommodation project received approval from the Provincial Development and Reform Commission. Located southwest of the existing terminal, the complex consists of a five-star hotel and a three-star hotel, with about 600 rooms and an estimated total investment of 600 million yuan.

According to the master plan for Jinan Yaoqiang International Airport, the long-term goal is the "3-4-8" development plan: three terminal buildings, four runways, and the capacity to handle 80 million passengers annually in the future.

== Future expansions ==
In September 2019, CAAC approved a new master plan for the airport.

== Airlines and destinations ==
Jinan Yaoqiang International Airport (TNA) serves as a major regional aviation hub in eastern China, operating approximately 150 routes to over 90 cities worldwide. It currently handles an average of 1,100 passenger flights daily.

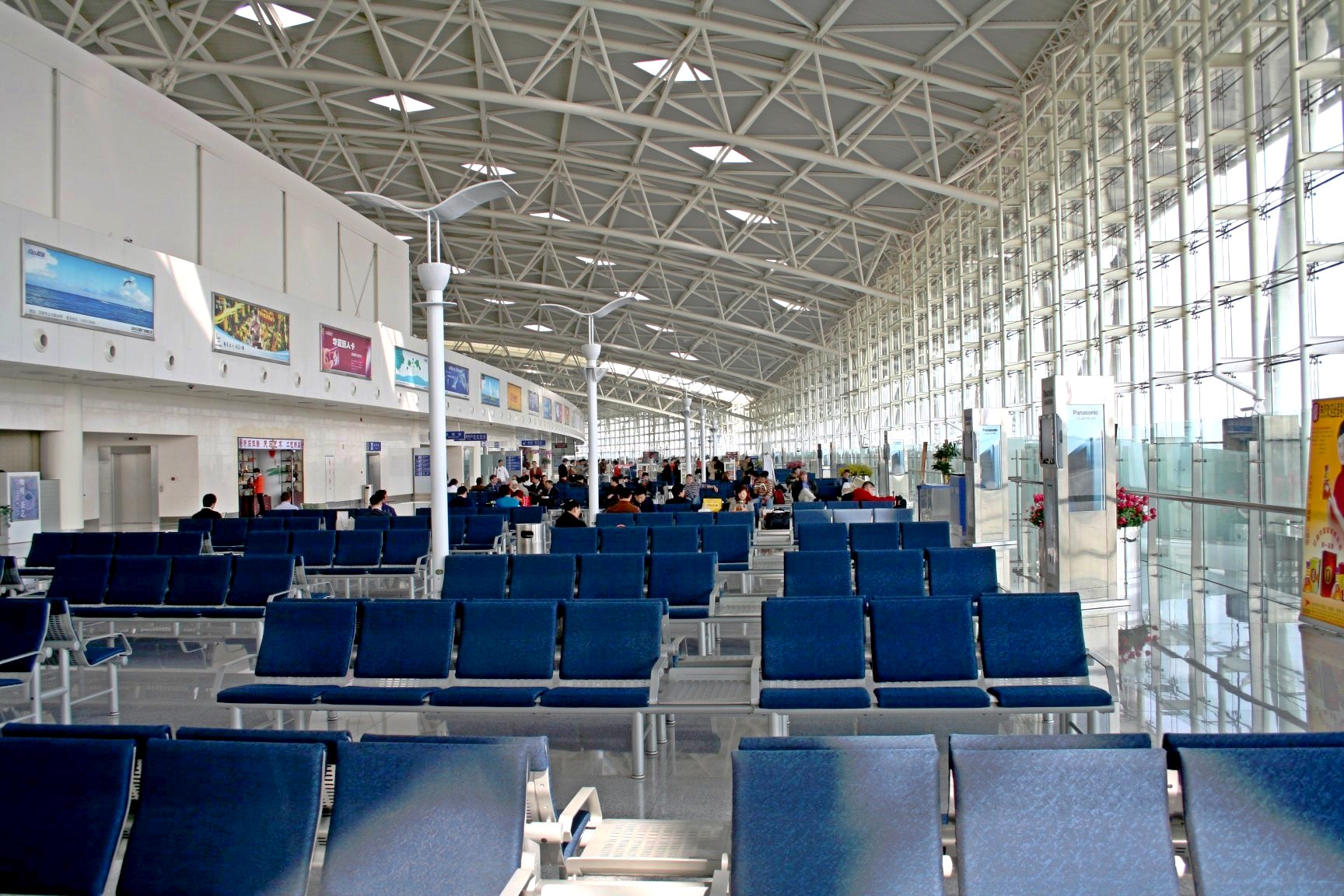
Inside the terminal building

| Airlines | Destinations |
|---|---|
| Air China | Changsha, Chengdu–Tianfu, Dalian |
| Air Guilin | Guilin, Qionghai, Qitai, Xishuangbanna |
| Air Macau | Macau |
| Beijing Capital Airlines | Haikou, Harbin, Lijiang |
| Chengdu Airlines | Changsha, Chengdu–Tianfu, Fuzhou, Hailar, Hami, Jixi, Shihezi, Yining |
| China Eastern Airlines | Changchun, Chengdu–Tianfu, Chongqing, Guangzhou, Huizhou, Jiamusi, Kunming, Lanzhou, Nanchang, Ordos, Qiqihar, Shanghai–Hongqiao, Shanghai–Pudong, Sydney, Wuhan, Xi'an, Xining, Yinchuan |
| China Express Airlines | Chifeng, Hohhot, Xilinhot |
| China Southern Airlines | Guangzhou, Jieyang, Kashgar, Shenzhen, Urumqi |
| Colorful Guizhou Airlines | Guiyang |
| Donghai Airlines | Shangrao, Shenzhen, Yichang |
| GX Airlines | Chengdu–Tianfu, Chifeng, Guilin, Haikou, Hanoi, Hengyang, Holingol, Jakarta–Soekarno-Hatta, Nanning, Shenyang, Shiyan, Vientiane, Yulin (Shaanxi), |
| Hainan Airlines | Changsha, Guangzhou, Haikou, Harbin, Sanya, Shenyang, Urumqi |
| Jiangxi Air | Nanchang, Shenyang |
| Kunming Airlines | Jingzhou, Kunming |
| Loong Air | Changchun |
| Lucky Air | Chengdu–Tianfu, Ganzhou, Kunming, Luzhou, Xishuangbanna |
| Okay Airways | Changsha, Harbin |
| Qingdao Airlines | Changchun, Guiyang |
| Shandong Airlines | Bangkok–Suvarnabhumi, Changchun, Changsha, Chengdu–Tianfu, Chongqing, Dalian, Fuzhou, Guangzhou, Guilin, Guiyang, Hanoi, Haikou, Harbin, Hohhot, Ho Chi Minh City, Hong Kong, Kashgar, Korla, Kuala Lumpur–International, Kunming, Lanzhou, Lijiang, Nanchang, Nanning, Osaka–Kansai, Quanzhou, Sanya, Seoul–Incheon, Shanghai–Hongqiao, Shenyang, Shenzhen, Singapore, Taizhou, Urumqi, Weihai, Wenzhou, Wuhan, Wuyishan, Xiamen, Xi'an, Xining, Yangzhou, Yantai, Yinchuan, Yuncheng, Zhoushan, Zhuhai |
| Shenzhen Airlines | Guangzhou, Shenzhen |
| Sichuan Airlines | Bazhong, Changchun, Chengdu–Shuangliu, Chengdu–Tianfu, Chongqing, Guangyuan, Harbin, Kunming, Nanning, Sanya, Wenzhou, Xishuangbanna |
| Spring Airlines | Chengdu–Tianfu, Dalian, Enshi, Lanzhou, Shenzhen |
| Suparna Airlines | Mianyang, Shenzhen |
| Tianjin Airlines | Haikou, Tongliao |
| Trinity Airways | Seoul–Incheon |
| West Air | Changsha, Chongqing, Sanya, Shenzhen |
| XiamenAir | Changchun, Changsha, Fuzhou, Harbin, Quanzhou, Urumqi, Xiamen |
| Xizang Airlines | Chengdu–Shuangliu, Kunming, Xishuangbanna |

=== Cargo ===
| Airlines | Destinations |
|---|---|
| ASL Airlines | Liege |
| Atlas Air | Luxembourg |
| China Postal Airlines | Nanjing |
| One Air | London–Heathrow |
| SF Airlines | Ezhou |
| Shandong Airlines | Osaka-Kansai |

== Transport ==
The airport is served by Line 3 of Jinan Metro.

== See also ==
- List of the busiest airports in China
