= Nanchang Changbei International Airport =

Commercial airport serving Nanchang, Jiangxi, China

Nanchang Changbei International Airport 南昌昌北国际机场
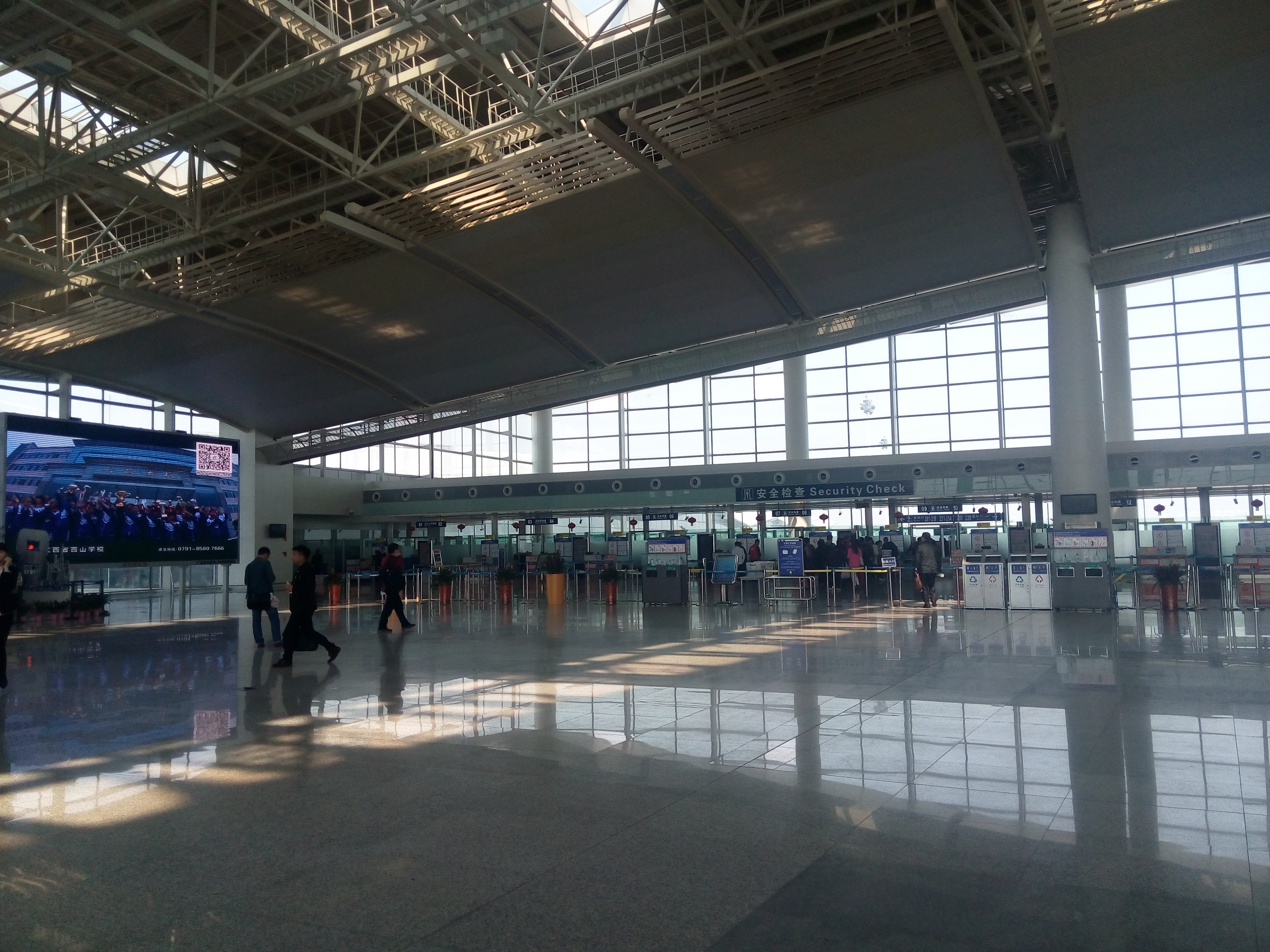
- IATA: KHN; ICAO: ZSCN

Summary
- Airport type: Public
- Operator: Capital Airport Holding
- Serves: Nanchang
- Location: Lehua Town, Xinjian District, Nanchang, Jiangxi, China
- Opened: 10 September 1999; 27 years ago
- Hub for: China Eastern Airlines; Jiangxi Air
- Elevation AMSL: 44 m (144 ft)
- Coordinates: 28°51′54″N 115°54′00″E

Maps
- CAAC airport chart
- Location in Jiangxi KHN/ZSCN (China)

Runways
Direction	Length		Surface
Direction	m	ft	Surface
03/21	3,400	11,155	Concrete

Statistics (2025)
- Passengers: 11,936,032
- Aircraft movements: 92,149
- Cargo (metric tons): 42,413.6
- Source: List of the busiest airports in the People's Republic of China

Nanchang Changbei International Airport
- Simplified Chinese: 南昌昌北国际机场
- Traditional Chinese: 南昌昌北國際機場
Transcriptions
Standard Mandarin
- Hanyu Pinyin: Nánchāng Chāngběi Guójì Jīchǎng

Nanchang Changbei International Airport (IATA: KHN, ICAO: ZSCN) is an international airport serving Nanchang, the capital of East China's Jiangxi province. It is located 28 km (17 mi) north of Nanchang. Construction began in October 1996 and the airport went into operation on 10 September 1999, replacing Nanchang Xiangtang Airport. It was upgraded to an international airport and was greatly expanded in 2008–2011.

According to the Civil Aviation Administration of China, in 2025, Nanchang Changbei International Airport recorded 92,149 flight takeoffs and landings, and 11.936 million passenger movements, representing a year-on-year increases of 4.1% and 5.9% respectively.

== History ==
Before Changbei, Nanchang Xiangtang Airport, a dual-use civil and military airport, served as Nanchang's main airport from 1957 to 1999. From 102 passengers in 1957, by 1996 Xiangtang served more than 800,000 passengers annually and could no longer accommodate more traffic. In 1996, construction began for Changbei Airport, originally designed to handle 2 million passengers annually. On 10 September 1999, Changbei Airport was opened and all commercial flights were transferred from Xiangtang, which reverted to sole military use.

In 2003, Capital Airport Holding took over the operation of Changbei Airport from the Jiangxi Provincial Government. In the same year, it handled more than 1 million annual passengers for the first time. In 2004, Changbei was upgraded to an international airport. Passenger volume grew exponentially in the 2000s, and the airport underwent major expansion in 2008. At its completion in 2011, Changbei Airport became a Class 4E international airport, capable of handling 12 million passengers per year.

However, the rapid expansion of China's high-speed railway network diverted much of the airport's passenger volume, and passenger growth at Changbei slowed to 6.3%, 3.4%, and 5% in 2014, 2015, and 2016, respectively. The governments of Nanchang city and Jiangxi province began subsidizing new flights in 2017 and passenger volume grew by 39% in that year and exceeded 10 million for the first time. By 2018, the airport hosts 46 airlines, which operate 127 routes connecting Nanchang with 68 cities. The third phase of expansion, which will connect the airport to Nanchang Metro and the Nanchang–Jiujiang high-speed railway, is under construction.

== Airlines and destinations ==
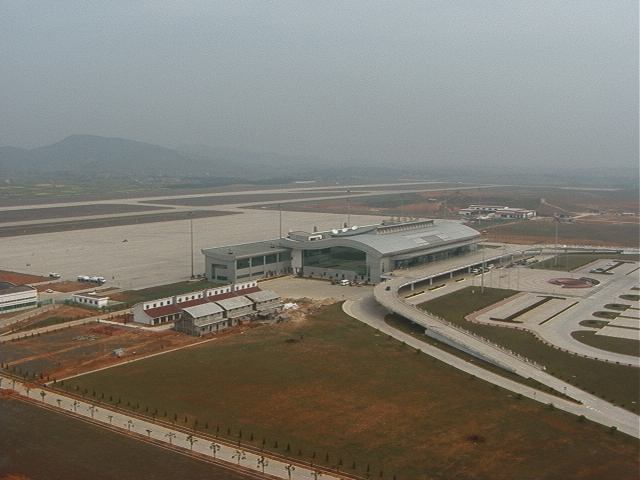
The airport in April 2000, shortly after going into operation

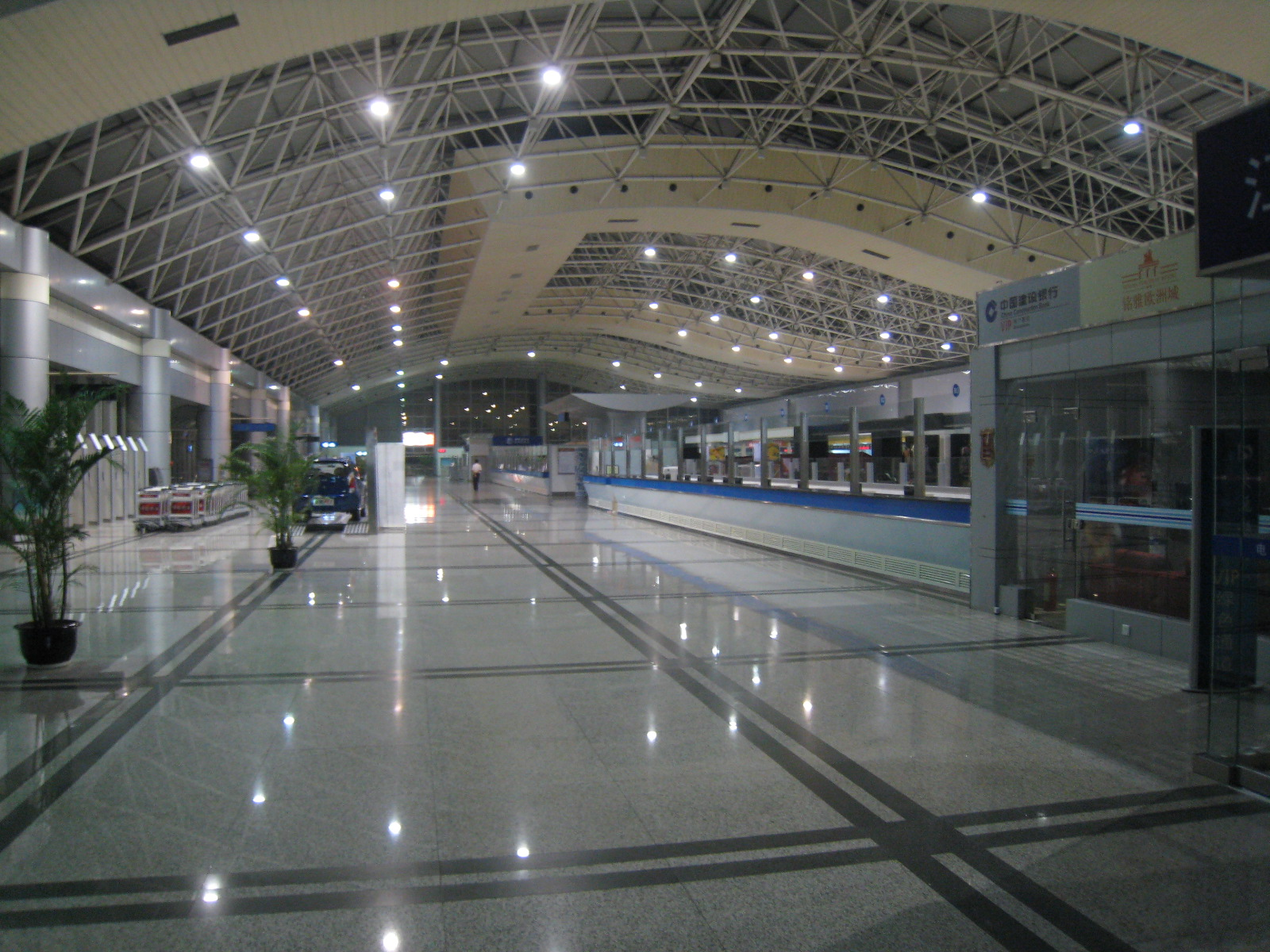
Terminal interior

Airlines	Destinations
Air China	Beijing–Capital, Beijing–Daxing, Chengdu–Shuangliu, Chengdu–Tianfu, Chongqing
Air Travel	Changsha, Kunming, Lanzhou, Lijiang, Mangshi
Beijing Capital Airlines	Haikou, Lijiang, Xining
China Eastern Airlines	Beijing–Daxing, Changchun, Chengdu–Tianfu, Dalian, Enshi, Guangzhou, Guilin, Haikou, Harbin, Hohhot, Huai'an, Jinan, Jinzhou, Kunming, Lanzhou, Lianyungang, Longnan, Macau, Nanning, Nantong, Ningbo, Qingdao, Qingyang, Shanghai–Hongqiao, Shanghai–Pudong, Shenyang, Shijiazhuang, Singapore, Taiyuan, Weihai, Wenzhou, Xi'an, Xining, Xishuangbanna, Yangzhou, Yantai, Yinchuan, Zhanjiang, Zhuhai
China Express Airlines	Zhoushan
China Southern Airlines	Guangzhou
Colorful Guizhou Airlines	Libo, Tongren, Xingyi
Hainan Airlines	Beijing–Capital, Dalian, Haikou, Hohhot, Nanning, Sanya
Jiangxi Air	Beijing–Daxing, Chengdu–Tianfu, Chongqing, Guiyang, Haikou, Harbin, Huai'an, Jinan, Kuala Lumpur–International, Kunming, Liuzhou, Luoyang, Luzhou, Nanyang, Qingdao, Shenyang, Taiyuan, Tianjin, Ürümqi, Xiamen, Xi'an, Xuzhou, Yancheng, Zunyi–Xinzhou
Lucky Air	Chengdu–Tianfu, Dali, Kunming, Xishuangbanna
Okay Airways	Xi'an
Qingdao Airlines	Qingdao, Xishuangbanna
Shandong Airlines	Jinan, Qingdao, Zhuhai
Shanghai Airlines	Shanghai–Hongqiao
Shenzhen Airlines	Chengdu–Tianfu, Chongqing, Dalian, Haikou, Harbin, Kunming, Linyi, Nanning, Shenyang, Shenzhen, Taiyuan, Tianjin, Yuncheng
Sichuan Airlines	Chengdu–Tianfu, Chongqing, Nanning, Tianjin, Zhoushan
Spring Airlines	Changchun, Dalian, Lanzhou, Qingdao, Taiyuan, Tianjin, Xi'an, Yinchuan
Tianjin Airlines	Jining, Yulin (Shaanxi), Zhuhai
Thai Lion Air	Bangkok–Don Mueang
West Air	Chongqing, Harbin, Sanya

== Incidents ==
- Part of the airport exterior roof collapsed during strong winds on 4 March 2018.

== See also ==
- List of airports in China
