= Lanzhou Zhongchuan International Airport =

Airport serving Lanzhou, Gansu, China

Lanzhou Zhongchuan International Airport 兰州中川国际机场
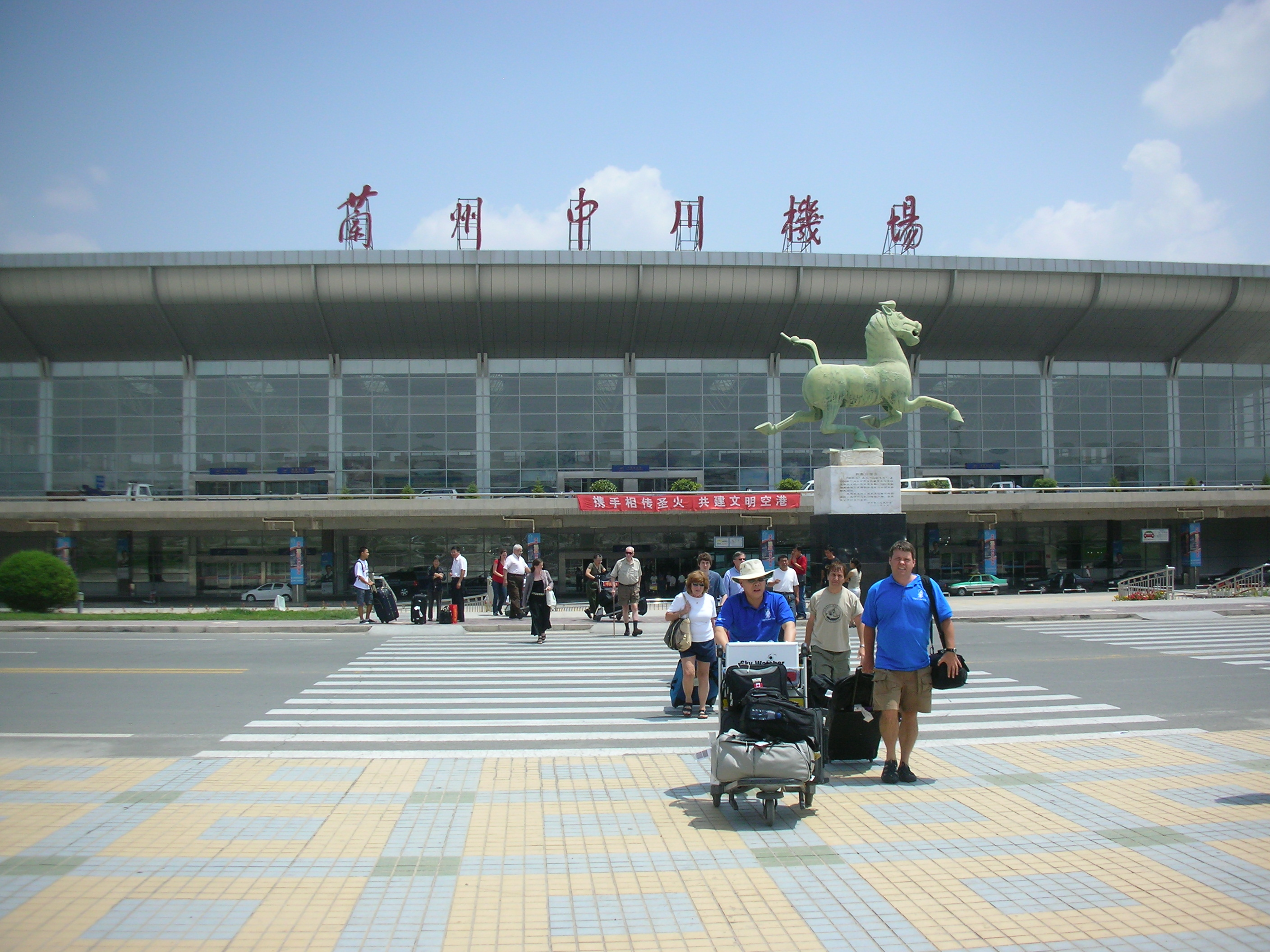
- IATA: LHW; ICAO: ZLLL

Summary
- Airport type: Public
- Operator: Gansu Airport Group
- Serves: Lanzhou
- Location: Zhongchuan, Lanzhou New Area, Gansu, China
- Opened: 26 July 1970; 56 years ago
- Focus city for: China Eastern Airlines; Hainan Airlines; Spring Airlines
- Elevation AMSL: 1,947 m (6,388 ft)
- Coordinates: 36°30′54″N 103°37′12″E

Maps
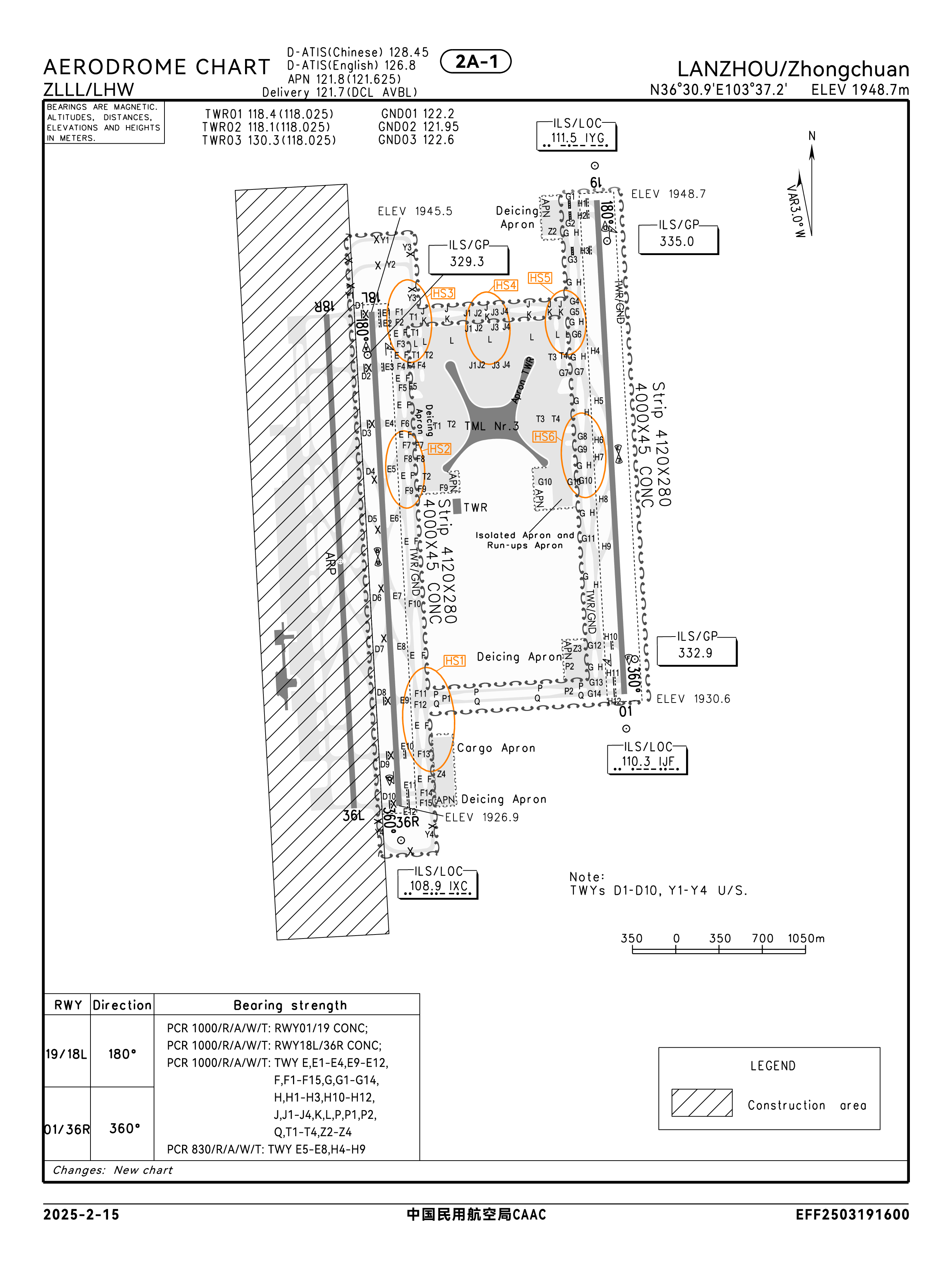
- CAAC airport chart

- Location in Gansu Location in China

Runways
Direction	Length		Surface
Direction	m	ft	Surface
01/19	4,000	13,123	Concrete
18L/36R	4,000	13,123	Concrete
18R/36L	4,000	13,123	Concrete

Statistics (2025)
- Passengers: 17,734,885
- Cargo (Metric tonnes): 86,144.3
- Aircraft movements: 126,112
- Source: List of the busiest airports in the People's Republic of China

Lanzhou Zhongchuan International Airport
- Simplified Chinese: 兰州中川国际机场
- Traditional Chinese: 蘭州中川國際機場
Transcriptions
Standard Mandarin
- Hanyu Pinyin: Lánzhōu Zhōngchuān Guójì Jīchǎng

Lanzhou Zhongchuan International Airport (IATA: LHW, ICAO: ZLLL) is an international airport serving Lanzhou, the capital of Northwest China's Gansu province. It is located 71 kilometres (44 mi) northwest of downtown Lanzhou. It was opened in 1970 and serves as a major air hub for the province of Gansu and western China. Its newest main terminal opened in 2025 accommodates 87 gates divided over 4 piers.

Lanzhou Airport is a focus city for China Eastern Airlines, Spring Airlines, and Hainan Airlines. Passenger traffic at Lanzhou Airport in 2025 was 17.7 million. In 2025, the airport was ranked 29th busiest in China.

== History ==
CAAC airport chart before phase 3 expansion

Lanzhou's first airport, Gongxingdun Airport, was located just 2 kilometres (1.2 mi) from the city centre. By 1957, the Civil Aviation Administration of China decided that Gongxingun Airport's location was too restrictive for the aviation needs of Lanzhou and designated a new site near Zhongchuan town. Due to the geography of Lanzhou, this closest suitable location is 71 km (44 mi) from downtown Lanzhou, which makes it the furthest airport it China from the center of the city it serves.

In 1968, construction was started on Lanzhou airport and on July 26, 1970, the maiden flight took place with the first aircraft landing of an Ilyushin Il-14. At the time, the airport handled 5 domestic routes. In 1980, Zhongchuan Airport handled 100,000 passengers annually, growing to 500,000 in 1995. On June 15, 1997, an expansion project was officially started.

In 2001, the current Terminal 1 was put into operation, allowing handling of 2.6 million annual passengers. In 2010, Lanzhou airport's passenger throughput exceeded 3 million people a year and the second expansion project started.

Terminal 2 officially started construction in 2010, after preliminary design approval and with an investment budget of 1.488 billion yuan and a designed passenger capacity of 10 million annually. In 2013, Lanzhou airport's passenger throughput exceeded 5 million passengers per annum, increasing the official Lanzhou airport ranking among the major airports within China. Terminal 2 opened in 2015 and later that year the Lanzhou–Zhongchuan Airport intercity railway between the airport and Lanzhou's urban area opened. By 2019, the Zhongchuan airport handled over 15 million passengers annually.

=== Third Expansion Phase ===
The third expansion phase, which began in 2019 at a cost of 31.69 billion Yuan, has now been completed. It includes the construction of the new Terminal 3, two new 4,000 meters (13,000 ft) long runways, and expanded airport facilities. Terminal 3 is four times larger than the combined floor area of the previous terminals.

To make way for the expansion, the entirety of the adjacent namesake Zhongchuan town and several villages—totaling 10.7 square kilometres (4.1 sq mi) — were demolished, and residents were relocated to Lanzhou and Lanzhou New Area. Terminal 3 and the expanded facilities officially opened on 20 March 2025.

=== Statistics ===
Annual passenger and cargo statistics
Year	Passengers	Change	Cargo (×1000 tons)	Change	Source
1980	100,000				
1995	500,000				
1996	650,000				
2010	3,000,000				
2011	3,809,000	▲5.7%	32	▲4.2%	
2012	4,584,000	▲20.33%	36	▲12.22%	
2013	5,650,000	▲23.26%	42	▲16.15%	
2014	6,589,000	▲16.63%	47	▲12.49%	
2015	8,009,000	▲21.55%	50	▲6.66%	
2016	10,897,000	▲36.1%	59	▲18.7%	
2017	12,816,000	▲17.6%	61	▲2.4%	
2018	13,858,000	▲8.1%	61	▲0.9%	
2019	15,303,000	▲10.4%	72	▲17.2%	
2020	11,127,000	▼ -27.3%	70	▼ -2.8%	
2021	12,171,000	▲9.4%	73	▲4.5%	
2022	5,942,000	▼ -51.2%	56	▼ -24.1%	
2023	15,637,379	▲163.1%	75	▲35.6%	
2024	17,001,000	▲8.7%	86	▲14.3%	

== Terminal complex ==
The new Terminal 3, which replaced the two older terminals is scheduled to handle all flights from 20 March 2025 onwards.

=== Terminal 1 ===
Shaped like the letter T, this terminal consisted of eight airbridges. The original terminal had a single airside level for arrivals and departures. Arrivals were segregated by a glass screen from departing passengers. Check-in was handled on the upper level, while the lower level housed the baggage hall.

With the opening of Terminal 2 in 2015, this terminal's landside facilities have been shut down for refurbishment and parts of the terminal will be mothballed until future growth warrants the reopening of these facilities. Airside lounges, gates and shops remain in use.

=== Terminal 2 ===
Designed and shaped to resemble the wing of flying geese, at 61,000 m^{2} (660,000 sq ft), this terminal greatly increased the operational space at Lanzhou Airport. It added an extra two piers to the existing terminal. It houses 30 extra check-in desks, 12 passenger gates, 9 airbridges and separate levels for arriving and departing passengers. The new terminal was opened for travellers in February 2015. After opening of the new Terminal 3, Terminal 2 was closed for renovations and is expected to transformed into a Cargo Terminal post renovation.

=== Terminal 3 ===
Terminal 3 construction preparations started in 2019. With a floor area of 400,000 square metres (4,300,000 sq ft), it dwarfs Terminals 1 and 2. The terminal has 87 gates, arranged over four piers. It officially opened on 20 March 2025.

A number of state-of-the-art IT infrastructures have been implemented, including 5G-Advanced network coverage and the use of a digital twin to aid operations.

== Airlines and destinations ==
=== Passenger ===
Airlines	Destinations
9 Air	Changsha, Guangzhou, Haikou
Air Asia	Charter: Kuala Lumpur
Air China	Aksu, Beijing–Capital, Beijing–Daxing, Chengdu–Shuangliu, Chengdu–Tianfu, Dunhuang, Hangzhou, Korla, Shanghai–Pudong, Tianjin, Wuhan
Air Guilin	Haikou
Air Travel	Kunming, Nanchang
Beijing Capital Airlines	Haikou, Hangzhou, Nanjing, Sanya
Chengdu Airlines	Barkol, Chengdu–Shuangliu, Chengdu–Tianfu, Fuyun, Kashgar, Qitai, Shache
China Eastern Airlines	Bangkok–Suvarnabhumi, Beijing–Daxing, Changchun, Changsha, Chengdu–Tianfu, Dunhuang, Guangzhou, Guilin, Haikou, Hangzhou, Hefei, Hohhot, Hong Kong, Huai'an, Jiayuguan, Jieyang, Jinan, Kuala Lumpur–International, Kunming, Longnan, Nagoya–Centrair, Nanchang, Nanjing, Ordos, Qingdao, Qingyang, Shanghai–Hongqiao, Shanghai–Pudong, Shenzhen, Shijiazhuang, Tianjin, Wuhan, Xiamen, Zhangjiajie, Zhengzhou
China Express Airlines	Chongqing, Dunhuang, Hami, Huizhou, Jiayuguan, Jinchang, Longnan, Qingyang, Quzhou, Yibin, Zhangye
China Southern Airlines	Beijing–Daxing, Changsha, Guangzhou, Guiyang, Haikou, Hangzhou, Kunming, Nanning, Shanghai–Pudong, Shenyang, Shenzhen, Ürümqi, Wuhan
China United Airlines	Beijing–Daxing, Yulin (Shaanxi)
Donghai Airlines	Qingyang, Shenzhen, Yichang, Zhuhai
Fuzhou Airlines	Changsha, Kashgar, Taiyuan
GX Airlines	Haikou, Qingyang
Hainan Airlines	Beihai, Beijing–Capital, Changsha, Dalian, Guangzhou, Guiyang, Haikou, Hangzhou, Hanzhong, Lianyungang, Linfen, Longnan, Nanchong, Nanjing, Sanya, Shenzhen, Shijiazhuang, Singapore, Tongren, Ürümqi, Xiamen
Hong Kong Airlines	Charter: Hong Kong
Juneyao Air	Bangkok–Don Mueang, Chizhou, Guiyang, Jinchang, Longnan, Qingyang, Shanghai–Hongqiao, Shanghai–Pudong, Vientiane, Zhangye
Loong Air	Enshi, Guangzhou, Hangzhou, Jiaxing, Jingzhou, Wenzhou, Xiangyang
Lucky Air	Kunming
Okay Airways	Sanya
Qingdao Airlines	Changsha, Hotan
Ruili Airlines	Jiayuguan, Kunming, Lijiang, Xishuangbanna
Shandong Airlines	Jinan, Qingdao, Taiyuan, Ürümqi, Xiamen, Zhengzhou
Shanghai Airlines	Shanghai–Hongqiao, Shanghai–Pudong
Shenzhen Airlines	Chengdu–Tianfu, Guangzhou, Nanjing, Shenzhen, Wuxi Zhengzhou, Zunyi–Maotai
Sichuan Airlines	Chengdu–Shuangliu, Chengdu–Tianfu, Chongqing, Dunhuang, Guiyang, Hangzhou, Harbin, Kunming, Mianyang, Sanya, Tianjin, Ürümqi
Spring Airlines	Aksu, Altay, Ankang, Bangkok–Don Mueang, Bangkok–Suvarnabhumi, Changchun, Changsha, Changzhou, Chengdu–Tianfu, Dalian, Fuzhou, Guangzhou, Guilin, Hangzhou, Harbin, Hefei, Hohhot, Jieyang, Jinan, Karamay, Kashgar, Korla, Luoyang, Nanchang, Ningbo, Shanghai–Hongqiao, Shanghai–Pudong, Shaoyang, Shenyang, Shenzhen, Shihezi, Shijiazhuang, Shiyan, Tianjin, Ürümqi, Xiamen, Yangzhou, Yining
Tianjin Airlines	Aral, Dalian, Haikou, Qingyang, Tianjin, Ürümqi, Yan'an
Tibet Airlines	Lhasa
Urumqi Air	Bole, Changsha, Hong Kong, Hotan, Huai'an, Ürümqi, Yangzhou, Zhengzhou
XiamenAir	Changsha, Dalian, Fuzhou, Hangzhou, Hengyang, Nanjing, Wanzhou, Wuhan, Xiamen, Zhengzhou

=== Cargo ===
Airlines	Destinations
SF Airlines	Almaty
YTO Cargo Airlines	Lahore

== Ground transportation ==
The newly opened Terminal 3 is directly connected with a Ground Transportation Center at 5 minutes walking distance, which offers bus and railway connections. A subway station is reserved. The eyecatcher of the Ground Transportation Center is a 2000 m^{2} curved LED display symbolizing 'the water of the Yellow River falling down from the sky'.

=== Rail ===
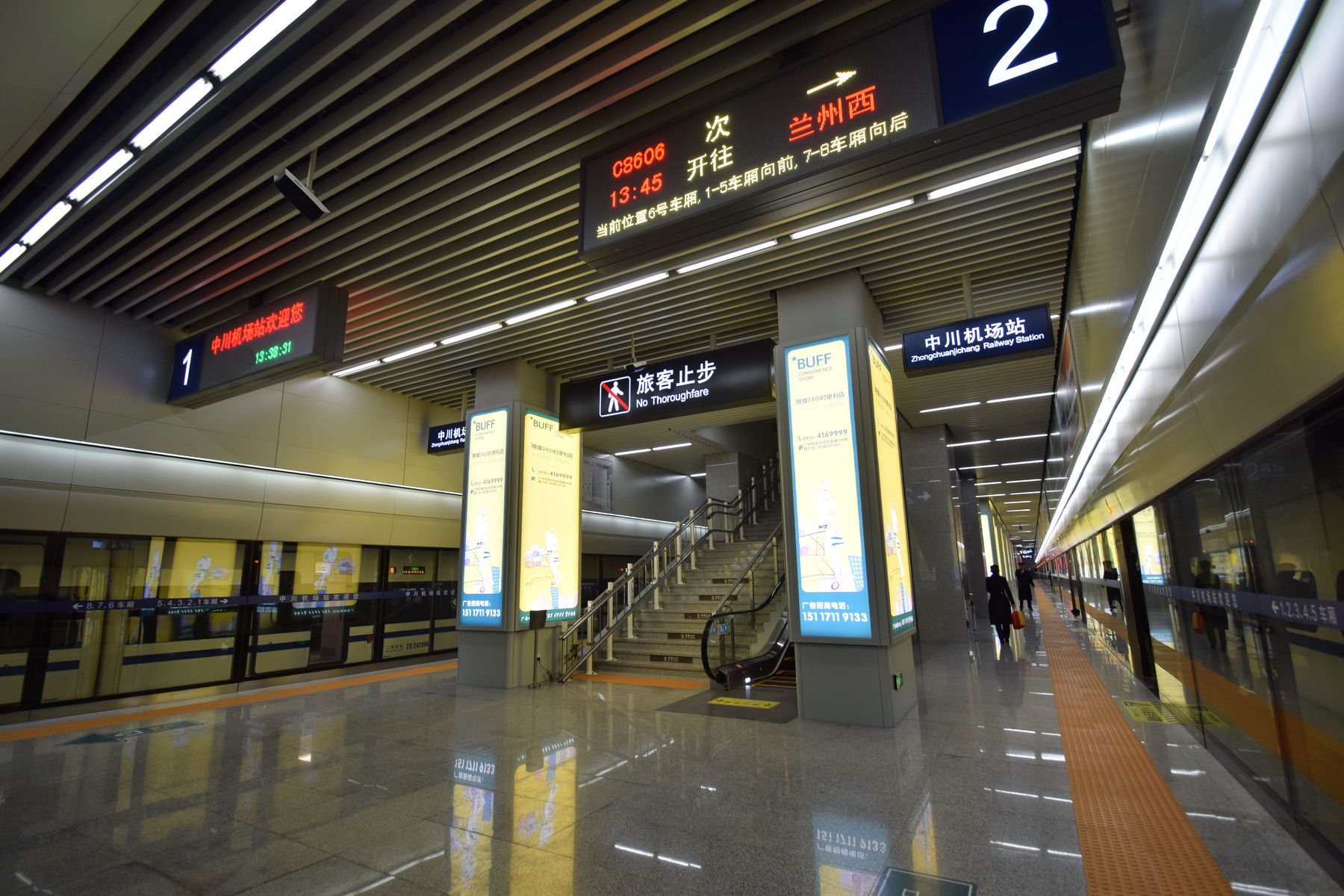
Zhongchuan Airport Railway Station, serving Terminal 1 and 2

The Lanzhou–Zhongchuan Airport intercity railway between the airport and the city started operation on 30 September 2015. It provides fast train services between Zhongchuan Airport East railway station and Lanzhou West railway station then continuing to Lanzhou railway station as well as trains to Wuwei and Yinchuan. Travel time to Lanzhou West railway station is 38 minutes. As a pilot project, passenger who have passed the railway security check do not have to pass through security again at the airport. Terminals 1 and 2 were served by Zhongchuan Airport Railway Station, Terminal 3 is served by Zhongchuan Airport Railway East Station.

=== Road ===
Shuttle bus

There are three Airport Express Shuttle Bus services available from the airport. All routes cost 30RMB.

- Line 1 runs to the Lanzhou Eastern Hotel, Tianshui Middle Road, opposite Lanzhou University western gate. The return service leaves from opposite the JJ Sun Hotel (next to CAAC Ticket Office), Donggang West Road. Travel time is about one hour, due to the distance of the airport from the city centre. This is the closest service to Lanzhou Railway Station.
- Line 2 runs to Golden Lily Hotel, Xijin East Road, via Taohai Market, Anning West Road. This is the closest service to Lanzhou West Railway Station.
- Line 3 runs to Qingshuiqiao in western Lanzhou.

Taxi

Taxi service is relatively expensive due to the long distance to the airport from downtown Lanzhou.

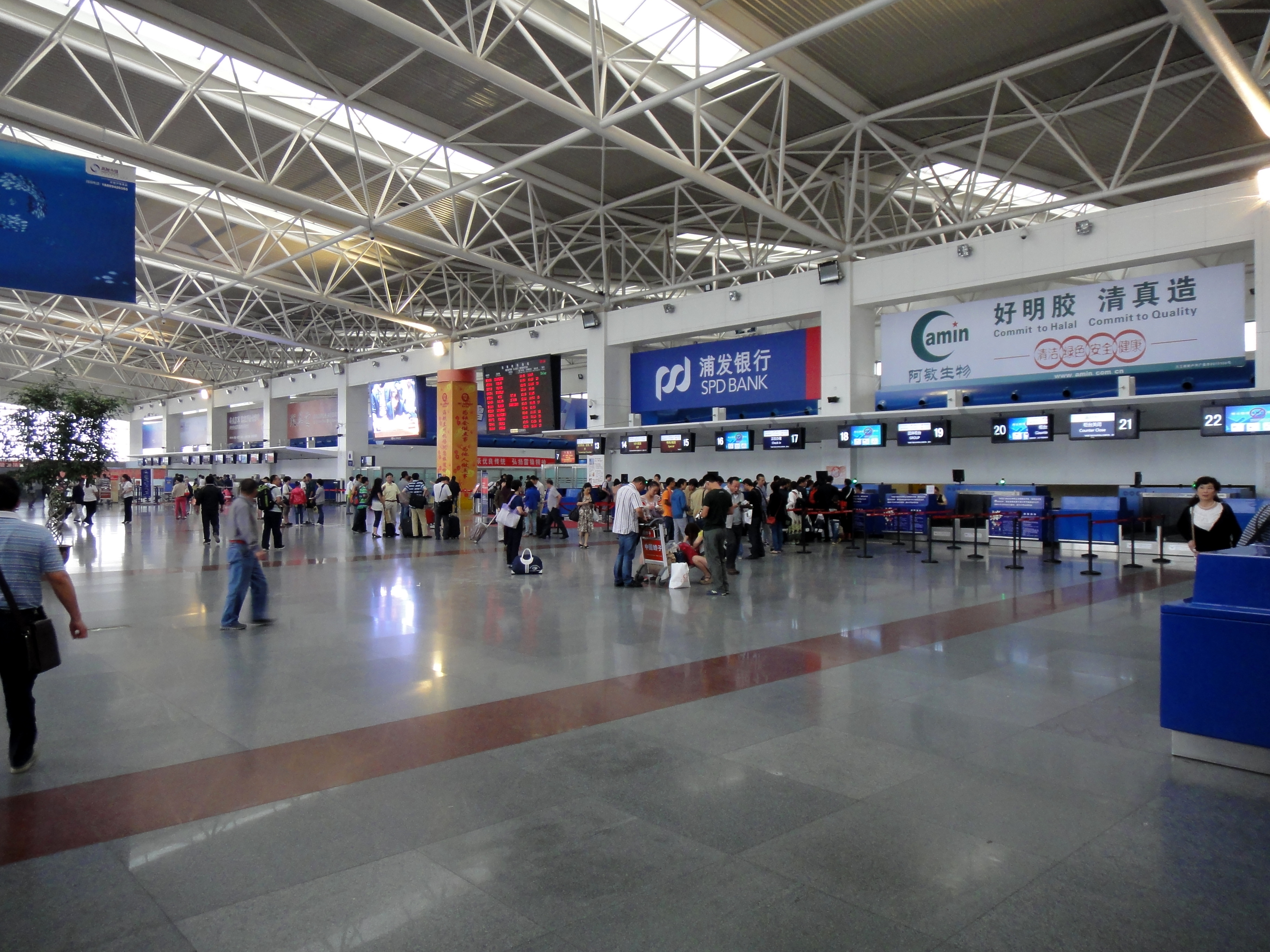
Departure Hall of Lanzhou Airport Terminal 1

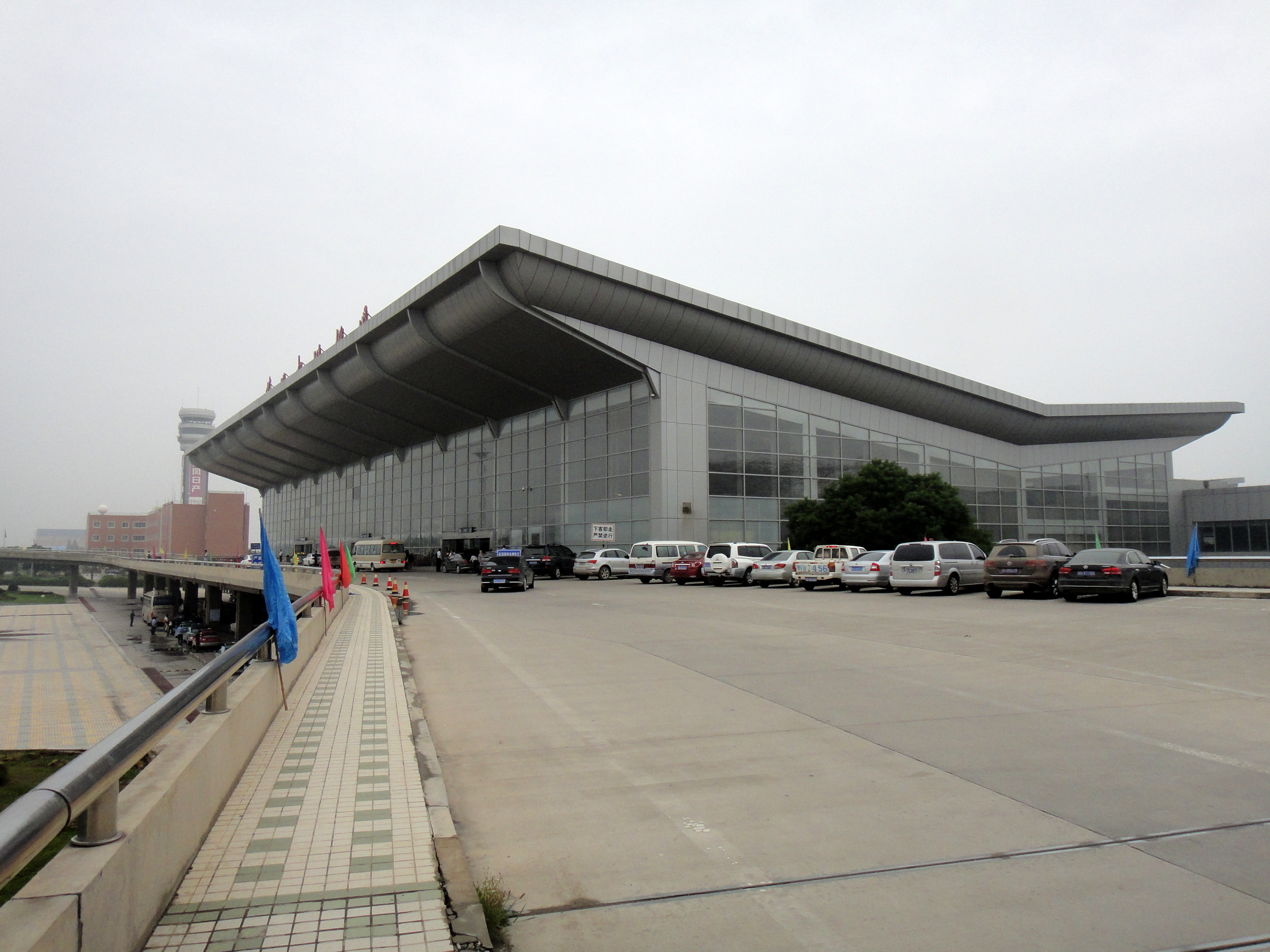
Existing terminal as seen from the south

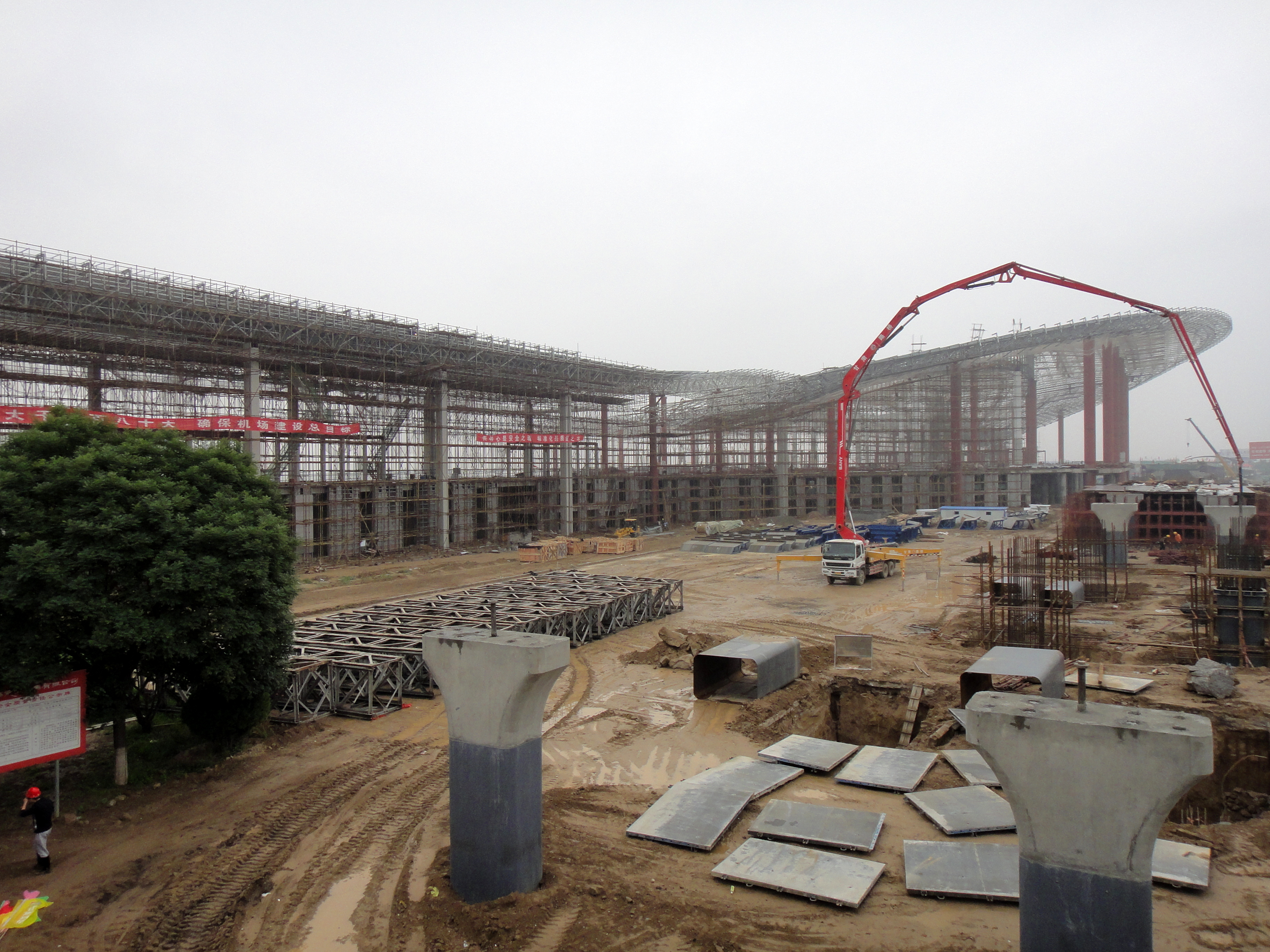
New terminal at Lanzhou Airport under construction to the immediate south of the existing terminal

== See also ==
- List of airports in China
