= Zhangye Ganzhou Airport =

Zhangye Ganzhou Airport 张掖甘州机场
- IATA: YZY; ICAO: ZLZY

Summary
- Airport type: Military/Public
- Serves: Zhangye, Gansu
- Location: Ganzhou District, Zhangye
- Opened: 1 November 2011; 14 years ago
- Coordinates: 38°48′07″N 100°40′30″E

Map
- Location of airport in Gansu

Runways
Direction	Length		Surface
Direction	m	ft	Surface
11/29	3,000	9,843	Concrete

Statistics (2025)
- Passengers: 297,932
- Aircraft movements: 3,026
- Cargo (metric tons): 190.3

Zhangye Ganzhou Airport
- Simplified Chinese: 张掖甘州机场
- Traditional Chinese: 張掖甘州機場
Transcriptions
Standard Mandarin
- Hanyu Pinyin: Zhāngyè Gānzhōu Jīchǎng

Zhangye Ganzhou Airport (IATA: YZY, ICAO: ZLZY) is a dual-use military and civil airport serving the city of Zhangye in Gansu Province, China. It is located 24 kilometers (15 mi) from the city center. Construction began in May 2010 to convert the air base to a dual-use airport, at an estimated cost of 313 million yuan. The airport was opened on 1 November 2011.

== History ==
Zhangye Ganzhou Airport was formerly known as Air Force Zhangye Airport. On November 14, 2008, the initial work on the dual-use reconstruction project of the air force airport was officially launched. In 2009, the State Council and the Central Military Commission approved the construction of Zhangye Airport for both military and civilian use. On May 11, 2010, the reconstruction project officially commenced.

On August 24, the calibration aircraft of the Civil Aviation Flight Inspection Center of China arrived at Zhangye Ganzhou Airport. On August 27, 2011, Zhangye Airport completed its calibration flight mission. The test flight was successful on October 14, 2011. On October 26, 2011, Zhangye Airport completed its acceptance test. On November 1, 2011, Zhangye Airport officially opened to traffic, with its civilian section named "Zhangye Ganzhou Airport." The airport launched the Xi'an-Lanzhou-Zhangye route operated by Tianjin Airlines EMB145 on the same day.

On March 30, 2025, Zhangye Ganzhou Airport suspended operations due to airport facility renovation and upgrades, with all routes and flights suspended. On May 16, 2025, Zhangye Airport officially resumed operations, with flight G54069 being its inaugural flight.

== Facilities ==
The airport has one 3,000-meter (9,800 ft) runway (class 4C), and a 4,126-square-meter terminal building. It is designed to handle 243,000 passengers and 1,700 tons of cargo annually by 2020.

== Airlines and destinations ==
Airlines	Destinations
China Eastern Airlines	Xi'an
China Express Airlines	Dunhuang, Lanzhou
China Southern Airlines	Guangzhou, Wuhan
China United Airlines	Beijing–Daxing
Spring Airlines	Shanghai–Pudong
Tianjin Airlines	Chongqing, Urumqi

== See also ==
- List of airports in China
- List of the busiest airports in China
- List of People's Liberation Army Air Force airbases
