= Dunhuang Mogao International Airport =

Dunhuang Mogao International Airport 敦煌莫高国际机场
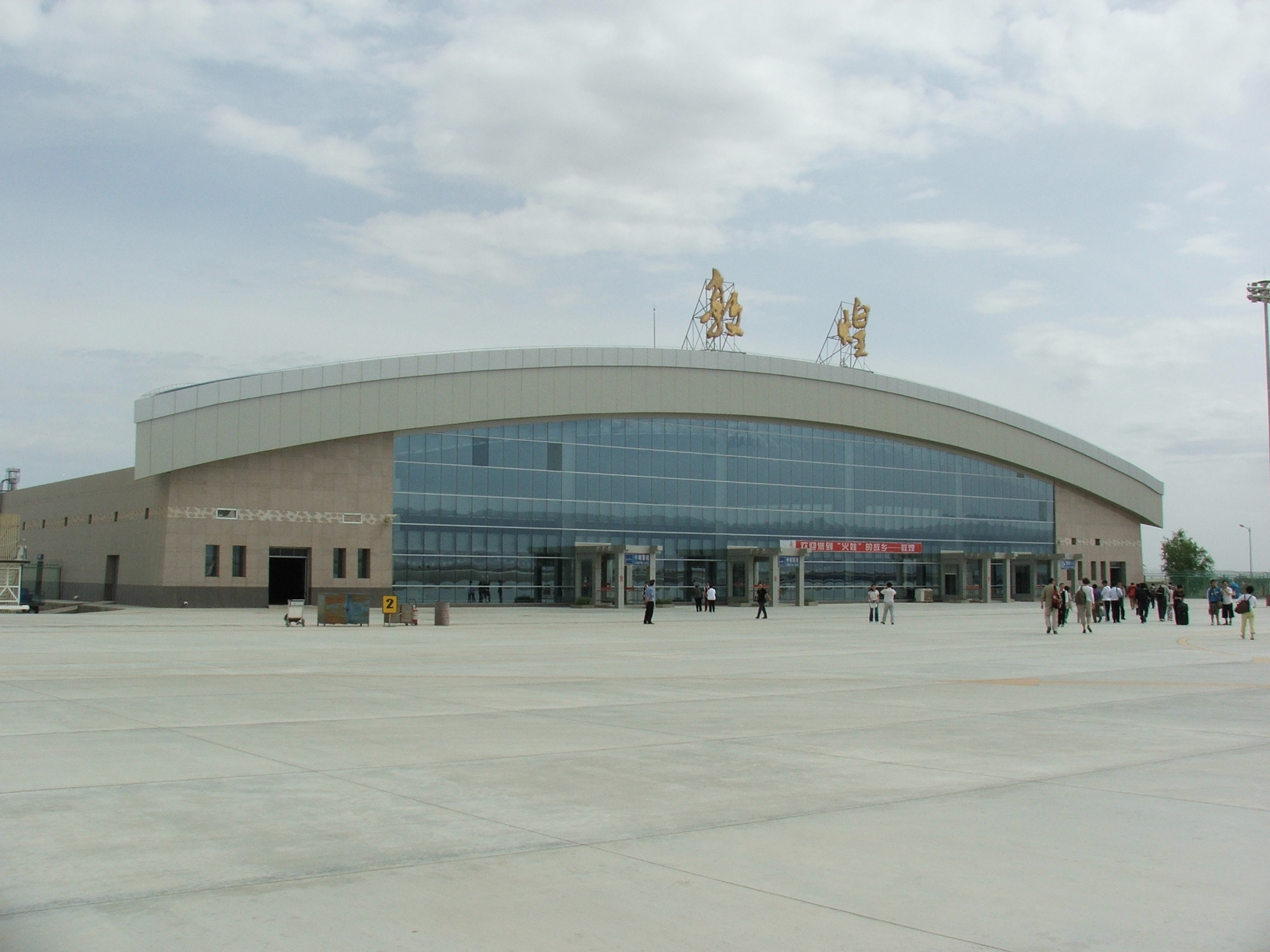
- IATA: DNH; ICAO: ZLDH

Summary
- Airport type: Public
- Serves: Dunhuang, Gansu
- Location: Mogao, Dunhuang
- Opened: July 1982; 44 years ago
- Elevation AMSL: 1,124.7 m (3,690 ft)
- Coordinates: 40°09′43″N 094°48′44″E

Map
- Location in Gansu DNH/ZLDH (China)

Runways
Direction	Length		Surface
Direction	m	ft	Surface
08/26	3,400	11,155

Statistics (2025)
- Passengers: 1,285,341
- Aircraft movements: 12,536
- Cargo (metric tons): 1,861.1
- Source: CAAC

Dunhuang Mogao International Airport
- Simplified Chinese: 敦煌莫高国际机场
- Traditional Chinese: 敦煌莫高國際機場
Transcriptions
Standard Mandarin
- Hanyu Pinyin: Dūnhuáng Mògāo Guójì Jīchǎng

Dunhuang Mogao International Airport (IATA: DNH, ICAO: ZLDH) is an airport serving the city of Dunhuang in Gansu Province, China. Airport is located 12.7 kilometers from downtown Dunhuang. It is an important domestic tourist feeder airport and serves as a major alternate airport for Ürümqi Diwopu International Airport in Xinjiang, as well as an emergency landing airport along Eurasian air routes. As of 2021, the airport had established partnerships with 13 airlines, operating 28 routes connecting 16 domestic cities.

In 2020, Dunhuang Airport was officially renamed Dunhuang Mogao International Airport, marking its transition to an international airport. It became the third county-level city airport in China to gain international status, following Yiwu Airport and Manzhouli Xijiao Airport.

In 2023, the airport handled 1,223,490 passengers.

== History ==
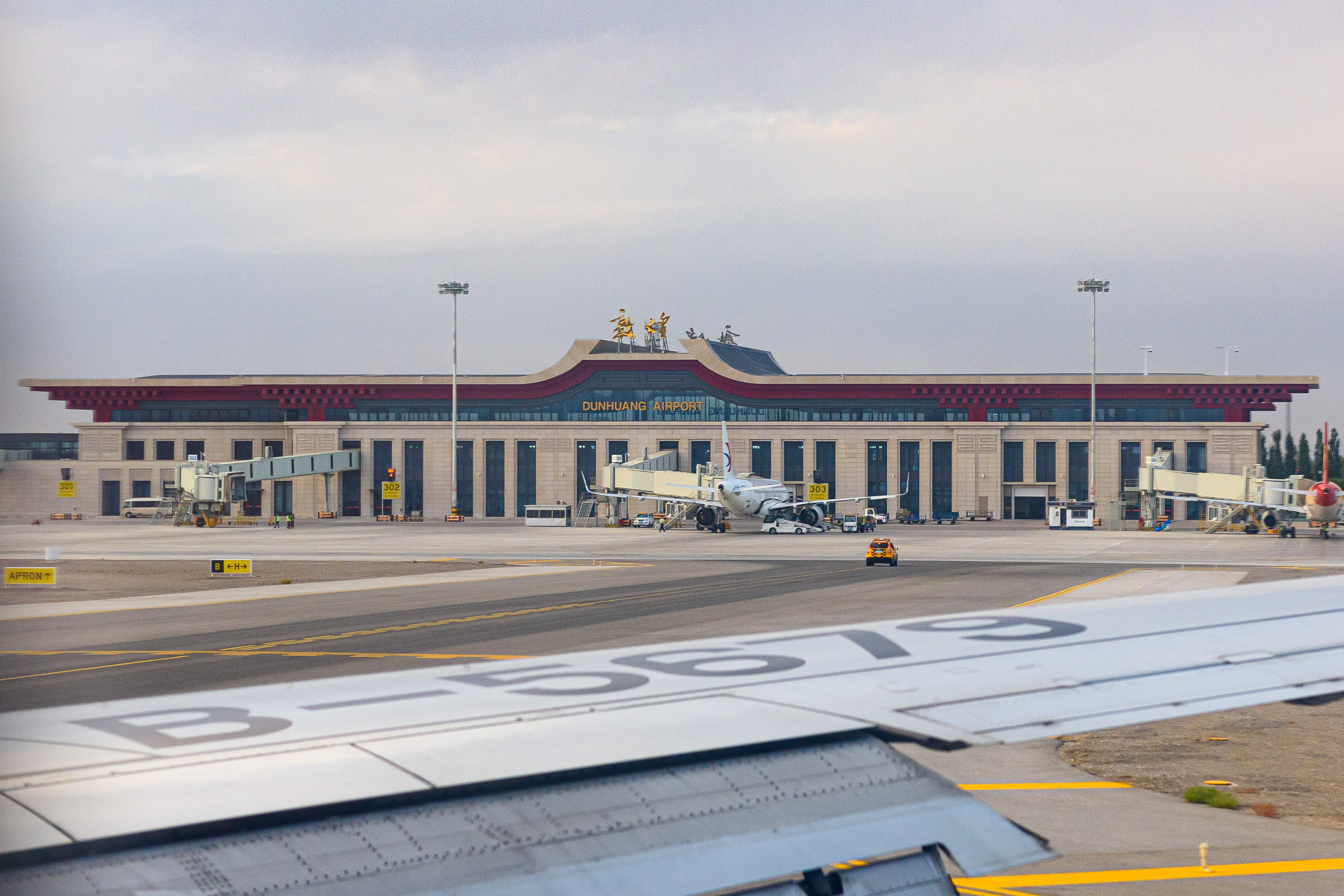
Airside of Terminal 3, Dunhuang Airport

On January 19, 1982, the Civil Aviation Administration of China (CAAC) approved the Lanzhou Administration's report on constructing an airport in Dunhuang to meet the growing aviation demand from tourism and local oilfield development. The project was included in the 1982 construction plan. Due to limited funding (capped at RMB 3 million), the initial phase prioritized building a runway and essential communication and safety infrastructure for Antonov An-24 operations only

On February 21 of the same year, the Dunhuang County government allocated 1,968.6 mu of Gobi Desert land for the project. By July 31, 1982, the airport had completed a 1,800-meter-long, 30-meter-wide runway, a 110-meter-long taxiway, and two 60-meter-wide aprons—meeting the minimum requirements for flight operations (classified as 3C). That day, An-24 aircraft B-3424 successfully conducted a test flight. However, no passenger terminal or control tower was built, so passengers waited in garages, and aircraft were directed from rooftops or communication vans.

Due to poor subgrade conditions, the runway quickly suffered from salt swelling and cracking. In 1987, the provincial government and CAAC initiated major runway repairs.

In 1984, the airport added a 60 m^{2} maintenance room and a 45 m^{2} fuel equipment room. Between 1986 and 1987, the first major expansion was carried out, including a new 1,780 m^{2} terminal, an extension of the runway to 2,200 meters, and the installation of night lighting. On August 7, 1987, a BAe 146 aircraft carrying 90 passengers successfully completed the first Lanzhou–Dunhuang flight.

To meet rising tourism demand, Beijing–Dunhuang flights officially launched on March 17, 1988. On June 1, 1988, a charter route between Xi'an, Dunhuang, and Beijing began operation. That same year, residential housing for airport staff was completed.

Despite repeated repairs, salt swelling remained unresolved. With tourism growing, the provincial government and CAAC agreed in the early 1990s to abandon the old runway and construct a new one capable of accommodating Boeing 737, Boeing 757, and Tupolev Tu-154 aircraft. On September 30, 1994, the State Planning Commission of China approved the proposal.

In December 1997, a revised feasibility report for the expansion was completed. It proposed rotating the existing runway 6 degrees clockwise, shifting it 200 meters south and 190 meters east, yielding a new 2,800-meter-long, 45-meter-wide runway. On December 28, 1999, the second phase of the airport expansion began. The new runway successfully passed a test flight on September 7, 2001. On August 18, 2002, a new terminal was put into use, completing the expansion. The airport was reclassified from 3C to 4C, with five aircraft stands.

In 2007, two new C-class stands were added to the east apron and approved on July 24, 2008.

In November 2013, the latest phase of expansion at Dunhuang Airport officially began. Designed to meet a projected annual passenger throughput of 960,000 and cargo volume of 500 tons by 2020, the project included construction of a new 6,000 m^{2} terminal, renovation of the existing terminal, a 5,500 m^{2} parking lot expansion, and a 46,700 m^{2} apron expansion with six additional aircraft stands.

On January 1, 2016, the airport's fourth expansion phase commenced. The non-aviation components were completed on July 19, civil aviation equipment installation and testing finished on August 10, and the project passed preliminary inspection on August 15. Final acceptance was granted on August 18, and the new facilities began trial operations on August 31.

From March 15 to May 25, 2017, Dunhuang Airport temporarily suspended operations due to airfield expansion works.

Following the upgrades, the newly built Terminal 3 had a total floor area of 12,198 m^{2}. The existing Terminal 2 was converted into an international departure hall, expanding from 4,383 m^{2} to 5,182 m^{2}. The airport's classification was raised from 4C to 4D, and the runway was extended eastward from 2,800 to 3,400 meters. Its annual passenger handling capacity increased from 300,000 to 960,000, with annual cargo capacity reaching 1,700 tons.

On August 17, 2017, the extended 3,400-meter runway was officially opened for use.

On May 27, 2020, the airport was officially renamed Dunhuang Mogao International Airport, making it China's third international airport located in a county-level city, following Yiwu Airport and Manzhouli Xijiao Airport.

== Facilities ==
Dunhuang International Airport has two terminals: Terminal 2 and Terminal 3. Terminal 2 serves international passengers and has an area of 5,182 square meters; Terminal 3 serves domestic passengers and has an area of 12,198 square meters.

The airport has a runway that is 3,400 meters long and 45 meters wide; the apron area is 2.21 million square meters and there are 20 aircraft stands, including 1 Class E stand, 2 Class D stands and 17 Class C stands; it can meet the needs of 960,000 passengers or 1,700 tons of cargo throughput per year.

== Airlines and destinations ==
Airlines	Destinations
Air Chang'an	Xi'an
Air China	Beijing–Capital, Hangzhou, Lanzhou, Wuhan
Batik Air Malaysia	Charter: Kuala Lumpur–International
China Eastern Airlines	Beijing–Daxing, Hefei, Huatugou, Lanzhou, Shanghai–Pudong, Xi'an, Xining
China Express Airlines	Chongqing, Hami, Jiayuguan, Jinchang, Lanzhou, Longnan, Qingyang, Zhangye
Fuzhou Airlines	Xi'an
Greater Bay Airlines	Hong Kong
Hainan Airlines	Guangzhou
Sichuan Airlines	Chengdu–Tianfu, Hangzhou, Kunming, Lanzhou, Xining
Tianjin Airlines	Chongqing, Urumqi

== See also ==
- List of airports in China
- List of the busiest airports in China
