= Jinchang Jinchuan Airport =

Jinchang Jinchuan Airport 金昌金川机场
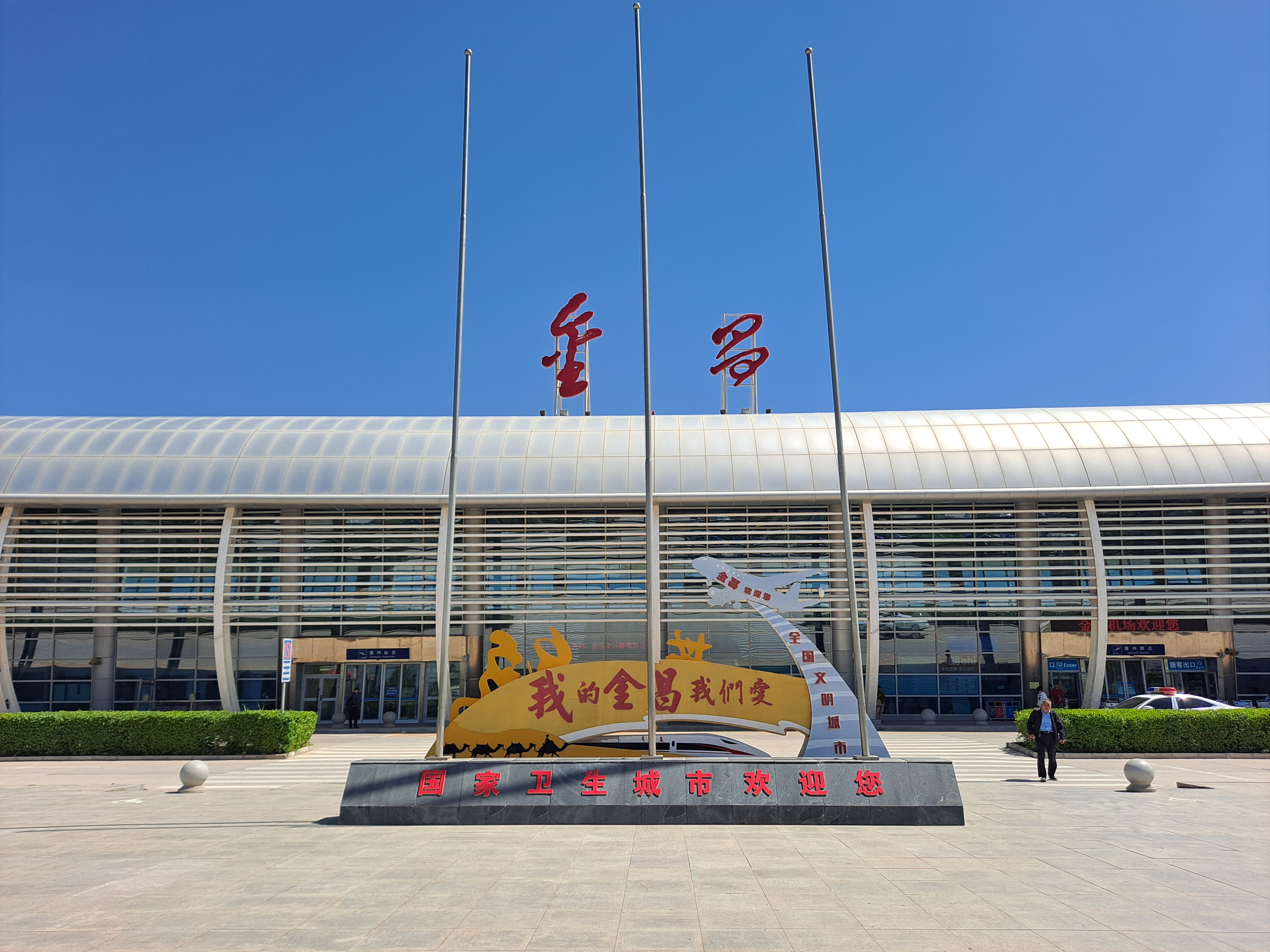
- IATA: JIC; ICAO: ZLJC

Summary
- Airport type: Public
- Serves: Jinchang, Gansu
- Location: Shuangwan, Jinchuan District, Jinchang, Gansu
- Opened: 29 August 2011; 14 years ago
- Coordinates: 38°32′31″N 102°20′52″E

Map
- Location of airport in Gansu

Runways
Direction	Length		Surface
Direction	m	ft	Surface
13/31	3,000	9,843	Concrete

Statistics (2021)
- Passengers: 180,280
- Aircraft movements: 2,395
- Cargo (metric tons): 485.3
- Source: AirNews, STV

Jinchang Jinchuan Airport
- Simplified Chinese: 金昌金川机场
- Traditional Chinese: 金昌金川機場
Transcriptions
Standard Mandarin
- Hanyu Pinyin: Jīnchāng Jīnchuān Jīchǎng

Jinchang Jinchuan Airport (IATA: JIC, ICAO: ZLJC) is an airport serving the city of Jinchang in Gansu Province, China. The airport was built with an investment of 343 million yuan, and was opened on 29 August 2011. It is the sixth civil airport in Gansu and the first to be built since 1982.

== Facilities ==
The airport has a 3,000-metre (9,800 ft) runway, and a 3,960-square-metre (42,600 sq ft) terminal building. It is designed to handle 200,000 passengers and 1,200 metric tons (1,200 long tons; 1,300 short tons) of cargo annually.

== Airlines and destinations ==
Airlines	Destinations
China Eastern Airlines	Xi'an
China Express Airlines	Chongqing, Dunhuang, Jiayuguan, Lanzhou
China Southern Airlines	Guangzhou, Wuhan
Hebei Airlines	Beijing–Daxing
Juneyao Air	Lanzhou, Shanghai–Pudong
Tianjin Airlines	Hangzhou, Ürümqi

== See also ==
- List of airports in China
- List of the busiest airports in China
