= Qingyang Airport =

Qingyang Airport 庆阳机场
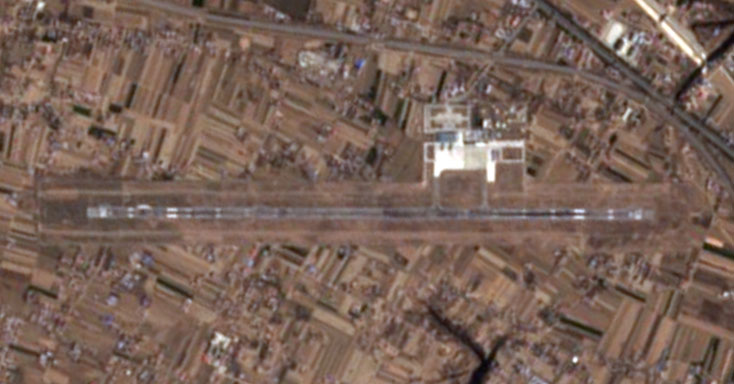
- IATA: IQN; ICAO: ZLQY

Summary
- Airport type: Public
- Serves: Qingyang, Gansu
- Location: Pengyuan, Xifeng District, Qingyang, Gansu
- Opened: October 1, 1977; 48 years ago
- Coordinates: 35°47′59″N 107°36′10″E

Map
- Location of airport in Gansu

Runways
Direction	Length		Surface
Direction	m	ft	Surface
14/32	2,600	8,530	Asphalt

Statistics (2025)
- Passengers: 607,386
- Aircraft movements: 30,154
- Cargo (metric tons): 159.4

Qingyang Airport
- Simplified Chinese: 庆阳机场
- Traditional Chinese: 慶陽機場
Transcriptions
Standard Mandarin
- Hanyu Pinyin: Qìngyáng Jīchǎng

Qingyang Airport (IATA: IQN, ICAO: ZLQY) is an airport serving the city of Qingyang in Gansu Province, China. Qingyang airport was unofficially called "Qingyang Xifeng Airport (庆阳西峰机场)" in Aviation Information System.

== History ==
Qingyang Airport was built in 1976 and opened to traffic on October 1, 1977, with a runway length of 1,800 m. The airport was closed in 1993 due to the ageing of the runway and the lack of suitable aircraft types. In 2003, Qingyang Airport was renovated as a 3C regional airport and was officially reopened on December 26, 2005. After the resumption of flights, Qingyang Airport was closed again in September 2010 due to the low flight classification and short runway, limited routes and the elimination of suitable aircraft types. On 21 November 2012, the airport resumed flights after an expansion to meet the 4C condition The expanded runway is 2,600 metres long and 48 metres wide. It is expected to handle 160,000 passengers, 550 tonnes of cargo and mail, and 3,200 aircraft movements in 2020.

== Statistics ==
Year	Passengers	Cargo	Notes
2019	488,805		
2020	359,522		
2023	432,904	256.2 tonnes	

== Airlines and destinations ==
Airlines	Destinations
China Eastern Airlines	Lanzhou, Nanchang
China Express Airlines	Dunhuang, Lanzhou, Jiayuguan
Donghai Airlines	Lanzhou, Shenzhen
GX Airlines	Haikou, Lanzhou
Hebei Airlines	Beijing–Daxing, Chongqing
Juneyao Air	Lanzhou, Shanghai–Pudong
Tianjin Airlines	Lanzhou, Tianjin
Urumqi Air	Hangzhou, Urumqi

== See also ==
- List of airports in China
- List of the busiest airports in China
