= Jiayuguan Jiuquan Airport =

Jiayuguan Jiuquan Airport 嘉峪关酒泉机场
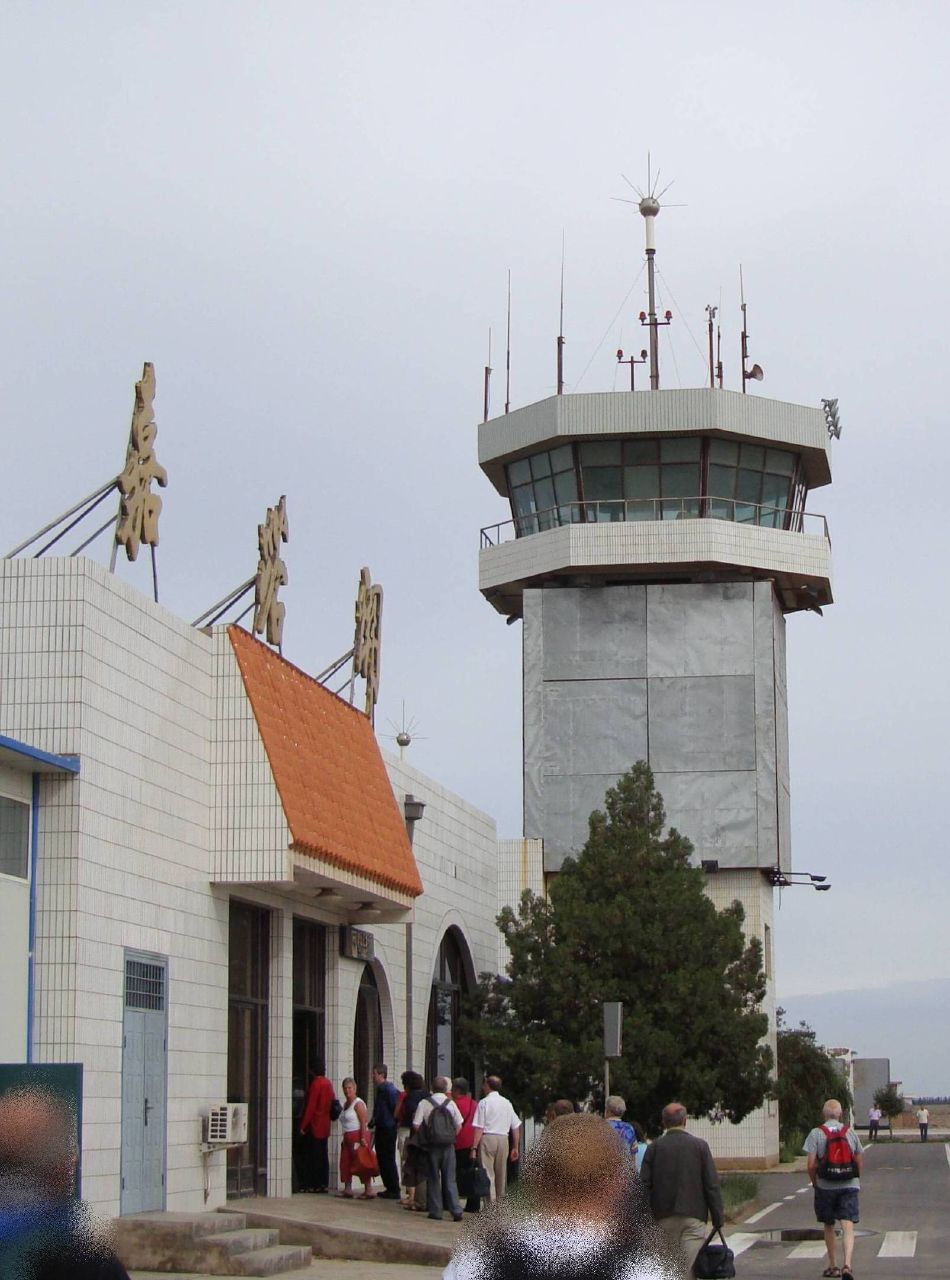
- Jiayuguan Airport
- IATA: JGN; ICAO: ZLJQ

Summary
- Airport type: Public
- Serves: Jiayuguan and Jiuquan
- Location: Jiayuguan, Gansu
- Elevation AMSL: 1,558 m (5,112 ft)
- Coordinates: 39°51′25″N 98°20′29″E

Map
- Location of airport in Gansu

Runways
Direction	Length		Surface
Direction	m	ft	Surface
14/32	3,000	9,843	paved

Statistics (2025)
- Passengers: 1,280,756
- Aircraft movements: 11,638
- Cargo (metric tons): 3,085.6
- Source: CAAC

Jiayuguan Jiuquan Airport
- Simplified Chinese: 嘉峪关酒泉机场
- Traditional Chinese: 嘉峪關酒泉機場
Transcriptions
Standard Mandarin
- Hanyu Pinyin: Jiāyùguān Jiǔquán Jīchǎng

Jiayuguan Jiuquan Airport (IATA: JGN, ICAO: ZLJQ) is an airport in Jiayuguan City, Gansu Province, China. It is located 9 kilometers northeast of Jiayuguan and also close to the city of Jiuquan. First built in 1938 for military use, the airport was rebuilt at the current location in 1953 and was formerly called Jiuquan Airport. It was expanded and reopened in August 2006. It is an important regional airport in Gansu Province and the only domestic and international E-class aircraft alternate (emergency) airport on the Lanzhou–Urumqi route and the Eurasian air route.

The airport was closed on 26 March 2023, by the Civil Aviation Administration of China for the major renovation and expansion works.

== History ==
In the 21st year of the Republic of China (1932), Eurasia Aviation Company built a temporary airfield at Xintiandun, 20 kilometers north of Jiuquan urban area. The airfield had only a dirt runway and two temporary earthen buildings for aircraft crew, serving four-seat Junkers planes manufactured in Germany. This marked the beginning of aviation in Jiuquan. In June 1938, Eurasia Aviation Company constructed Jiuquan South Suburb Airport on a gravel beach 4 kilometers south of the city.

The airport experienced frequent accidents in its early days. In 1938, strong winds caused 10 SB aircraft to lose their way; four landed successfully, while six crashed near Jiuquan. In 1947, a military C-47 transport plane crashed in Xishan, Jiuquan, killing all on board.

In the spring of 1949, Eurasia Aviation Company withdrew all personnel and equipment from Jiuquan to Shanghai. The Nationalist army dismantled equipment and damaged the airport facilities. Later, the airport was taken over by the People's Liberation Army(PLA). In October 1949, the PLA and the Soviet Eurasia Aviation Company carried out repairs on the runway, buildings, and roads at Jiuquan South Suburb Airport. Before the establishment of the Sino-Soviet Civil Aviation Corporation in July 1950, both SKOGA conducted construction work for the aviation station and airport maintenance in Jiuquan. The Sino-Soviet Civil Aviation Corporation began building the Jiuquan Aviation Station in 1952.

The Jiuquan Aviation Station was completed and put into operation on July 1, 1953, and the original South Suburb Airport was abandoned. Civil aviation service started the same year. In 1971, after Jiayuguan was upgraded to a prefecture-level city, Jiuquan Aviation Station was renamed Jiayuguan Aviation Station. Since 1987, Jiayuguan Airport has hosted multiple international and domestic gliding competitions and is recognized as one of the world's three most famous gliding bases alongside those in Australia and South Africa.

On November 28, 2004, the Jiayuguan Airport Company was officially established under Gansu Airport Group Co., Ltd. On August 9, 2005, the feasibility study report for the Jiayuguan Airport expansion project was approved by the National Development and Reform Commission. Construction began on October 28. The airport was temporarily closed for construction on March 1, 2006. Following a strategic cooperation agreement between Gansu Province and Hainan Airlines Group, Jiayuguan Airport was placed under HNA Group management on May 25. The expansion project was completed and accepted on July 31. Jiayuguan Airport resumed operations on August 4, with the runway length extended from 2800 meters to 3000 meters, apron positions increased to two Class C and one Class E stands, and the airport's aerodrome reference code upgraded to 4D.

In December 2008, the expansion project of the terminal area at Jiayuguan Airport was approved. In May 2009, the terminal area expansion and renovation broke ground. The project included the construction of a new 8,330-square-meter terminal building with a one-and-a-half-story passenger flow system and two boarding bridges; a new 26,000-square-meter apron and connecting roads; a new 7,200-square-meter parking lot and station plaza; an upgraded omnidirectional beacon and instrument landing system; and supporting facilities. On August 30, 2010, the Jiayuguan Airport expansion project was officially completed. On September 28, the project passed industry acceptance. In April 2019, the "Jiayuguan Airport Master Plan (2018 edition)" was approved by the Northwest Regional Administration of Civil Aviation Administration of China.

On March 20, 2023, with the approval of the General Office of the Civil Aviation Administration of China, Jiayuguan Airport was officially renamed "Jiayuguan Jiuquan Airport", with the English name "JIAYUGUAN JIUQUAN AIRPORT".

According to the approval by the Northwest Regional Administration of Civil Aviation, Jiayuguan Jiuquan Airport was closed and suspended from operation starting at 00:00 on March 26, 2023, for flight zone expansion and renovation construction. On September 7, 2023, after over five months of suspension (the planned construction period was six months), Jiayuguan Jiuquan Airport officially resumed operations. The total investment for the expansion project was 1.213 billion RMB, which included the construction and renovation of existing runways and apron; construction of a new 14,000 square meter T2 terminal building; renovation of the T1 terminal; construction of a new control tower and air traffic control building; expansion of the terminal area; and supporting facilities including navigation lighting, air traffic control, power supply, heating and cooling, and communication systems. After the expansion, the airport's aerodrome reference code is 4D (also accommodating emergency landings of Class E aircraft), capable of meeting the target for 2030 of an annual passenger throughput of 1.6 million, cargo and mail throughput of 10,000 tons, and 15,181 aircraft movements.

== Airlines and destinations ==
Airlines	Destinations
9 Air	Changsha, Guangzhou, Haikou, Ürümqi
China Eastern Airlines	Beijing–Daxing, Lanzhou, Shanghai–Hongqiao, Shanghai–Pudong, Wuhan, Xi'an, Yinchuan
China Express Airlines	Chongqing, Dunhuang, Jinchang, Lanzhou, Longnan, Qingyang
GX Airlines	Chengdu–Tianfu, Nanning
Jiangxi Air	Zhengzhou
Ruili Airlines	Kunming, Lanzhou
Sichuan Airlines	Chengdu–Tianfu
XiamenAir	Beijing–Daxing, Changsha, Xiamen

== See also ==
- List of airports in China
- List of the busiest airports in China
