= Longnan Chengxian Airport =

Airport in Longnan, Gansu, China

Longnan Chengxian Airport 陇南成县机场
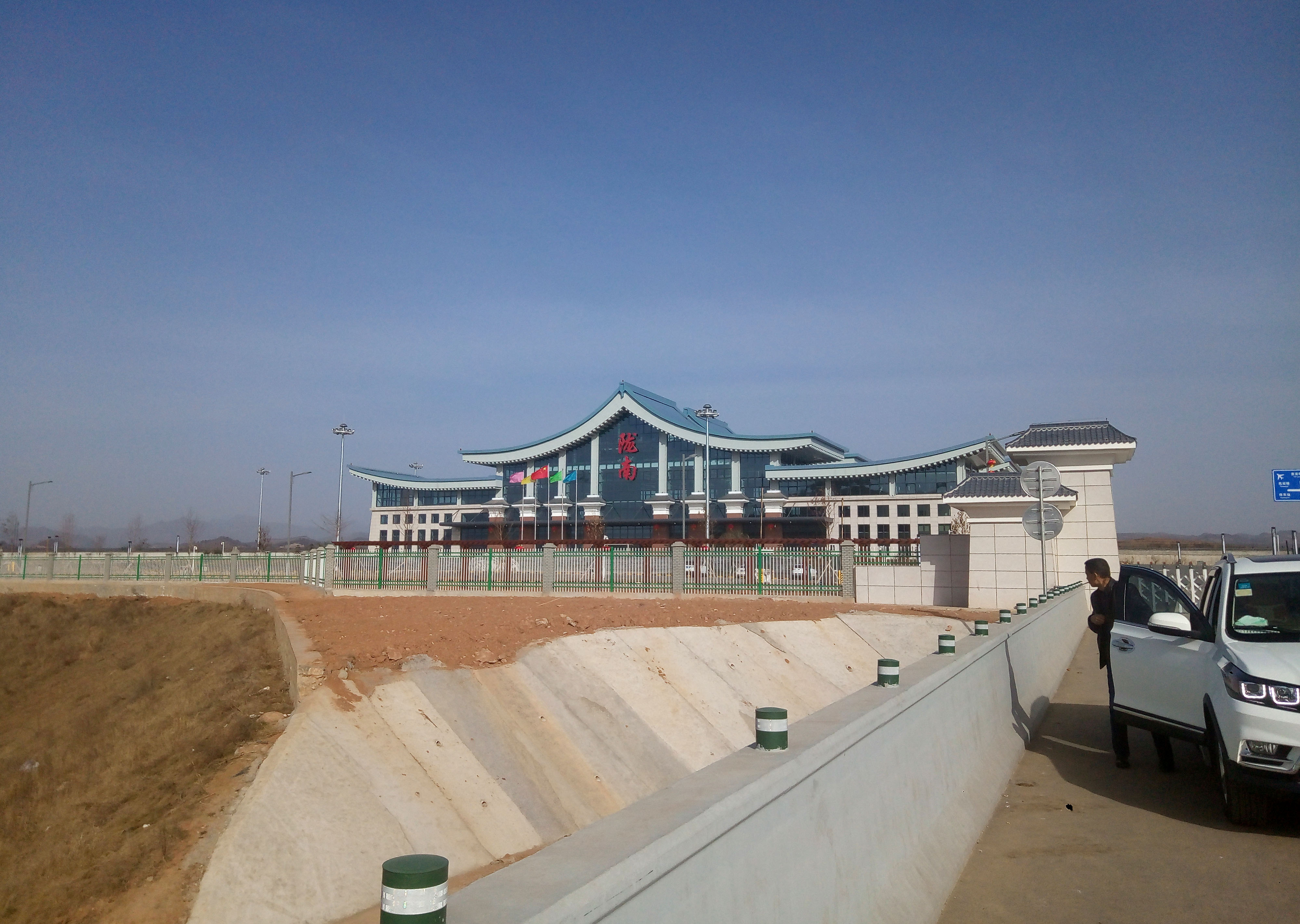
- Terminal building of Chengxian Airport
- IATA: LNL; ICAO: ZLLN

Summary
- Airport type: Public
- Serves: Longnan, Gansu
- Location: Cheng County, Gansu
- Opened: 25 March 2018
- Elevation AMSL: 1,130 m (3,710 ft)
- Coordinates: 33.788°N 105.797°E

Map
- Location of airport in Gansu

Runways
Direction	Length		Surface
Direction	m	ft	Surface
09/27	2,800	9,186

Statistics (2021)
- Passengers: 292,902
- Aircraft movements: 4,361
- Cargo (metric tons): 1124.5

Longnan Chengxian Airport
- Simplified Chinese: 陇南成县机场
- Traditional Chinese: 隴南成縣機場
Transcriptions
Standard Mandarin
- Hanyu Pinyin: Lǒngnán Chéngxiàn Jīchǎng

Longnan Chengxian Airport (IATA: LNL, ICAO: ZLLN) also known as Longnan Chengzhou Airport is an airport serving the city of Longnan in southern Gansu Province, China. It is located 10 kilometres (6.2 mi) from the seat of Cheng County, which is under the administration of Longnan city. The airport received approval from the State Council of China in July 2012, with a construction budget of 1.2 billion yuan. It was opened on 25 March 2018.

== History ==
On May 30, 2012, the State Council approved the construction of Longnan Chengxian Airport.

On September 13, 2017, the airport passed the flight inspection by the Civil Aviation Administration of China; on October 13, the airport's verification test flight was completed; it passed the final acceptance inspection on December 15–16. From December 20th to 22nd, 2017, the Northwest Regional Administration of Civil Aviation, together with the Gansu Regulatory Bureau, organized and completed the industry acceptance inspection.

On March 24, 2018, the Northwest Regional Administration of the Civil Aviation Administration of China issued a civil airport operating license to Longnan Airport. The airport operating permit includes: Flight area rating 4C; runway length 2800 meters, width 45 meters; airport elevation 1130.8 meters; pavement grade PCN 62/R/B/W/T; maximum permitted aircraft types: B737-800, A321-200; fire and rescue level 6, etc. On March 25, 2018, a Bombardier CRJ-900 aircraft operated by China Express Airlines, took off from Chongqing Jiangbei Airport and landed at Longnan Chengxian Airport, completing the airport's maiden voyage.

Starting in late September 2025, the airport launched a "non-stop construction" project to enhance the flight area's support capabilities. The project would last approximately 100 days and is scheduled for completion by the end of 2025, with the aim of further improving operational safety and efficiency. The project mainly included expanding the apron to the east side to add three (3B) general aviation parking positions, along with supporting facilities and equipment.

== Facilities ==
Longnan Airport is classified as a 4C domestic regional airport. It has a 3,500-square-meter terminal building and four aircraft parking spaces. It is projected to handle 150,000 passengers, 500 tons of cargo, and 2,150 aircraft movements annually by 2020.

== Airlines and destinations ==
Airlines	Destinations
China Eastern Airlines	Lanzhou, Nanchang
China Express Airlines	Dunhuang,, Jiayuguan, Lanzhou
Fuzhou Airlines	Xiamen, Xining
Hainan Airlines	Haikou, Lanzhou
Hebei Airlines	Beijing–Daxing, Guiyang
Juneyao Air	Lanzhou, Shanghai–Pudong
Shandong Airlines	Qingdao, Xi'an
Suparna Airlines	Shenzhen, Turpan
Urumqi Air	Hangzhou, Urumqi

== See also ==
- List of airports in China
- List of the busiest airports in China
