= GX Airlines =

Chinese airline

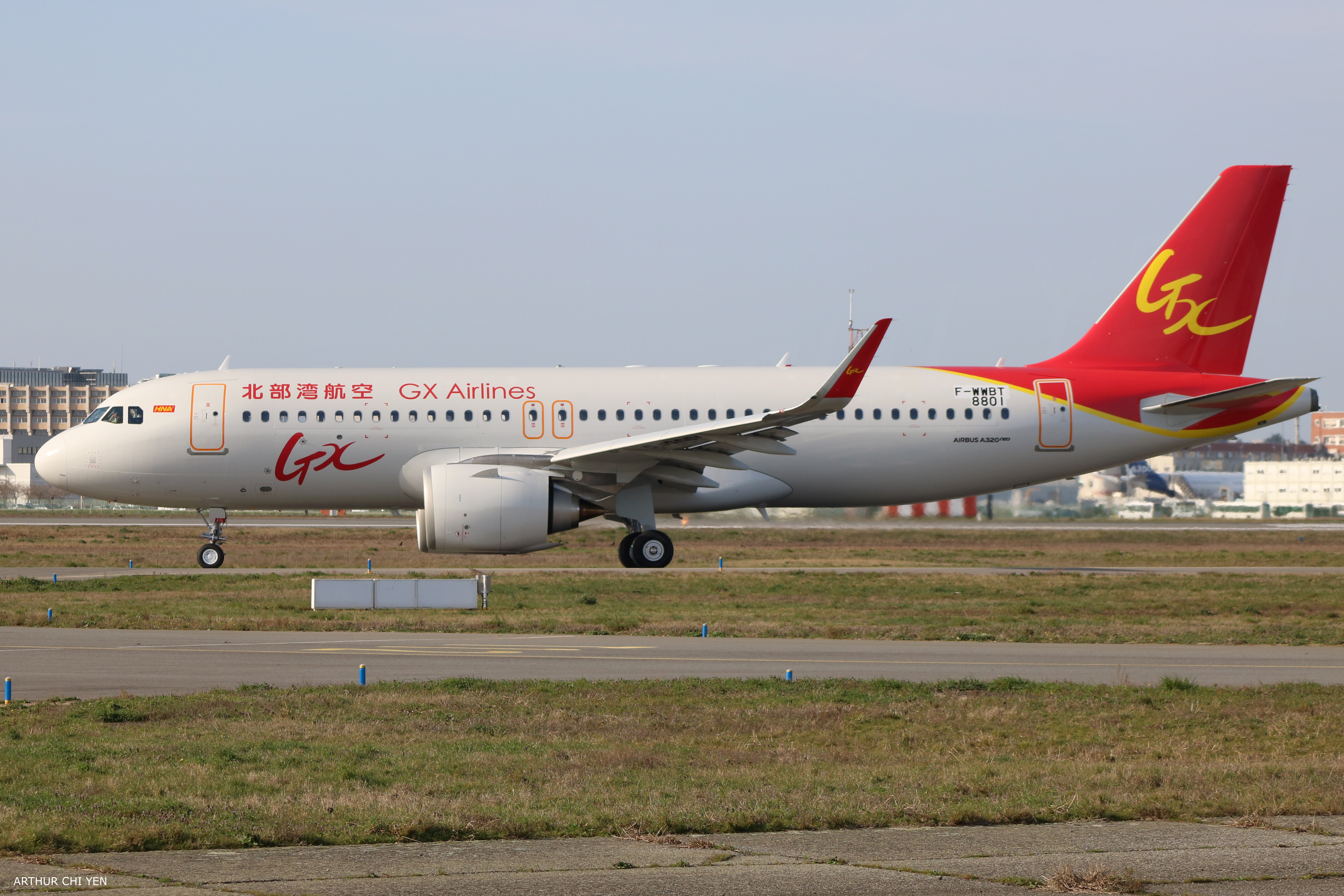
- GX Airlines A320neo
IATA	ICAO	Call sign
GX	CBG	GREEN CITY
- Commenced operations: 16 February 2015; 11 years ago
- Operating bases: Nanning Wuxu International Airport
- Fleet size: 25 (As of June 2026)
- Destinations: 59 (As of June 2026)
- Parent company: HNA Aviation
- Key people: Wu Chongyang, Chairman and President
- Website: www.gxairlines.com

Guangxi Beibu Gulf Airlines Co., Ltd.
- Traditional Chinese: 廣西北部灣航空責任公司
- Simplified Chinese: 广西北部湾航空责任公司
- Literal meaning: Guangxi Gulf of Tonkin Airline Limited Liability Company
Transcriptions
Standard Mandarin
- Hanyu Pinyin: Guǎngxī Běibùwān Hángkōng Zérèngōngsī

Guangxi Beibu Gulf Airlines (Chinese: 北部湾航空; pinyin: Běibùwān hángkōng), or simply GX Airlines, is a Chinese airline based at Nanning Wuxu International Airport. It is a joint venture between Tianjin Airlines and the Guangxi Beibu Gulf Investment Group. GX Airlines commenced operations on 16 February 2015 as one of the first airlines based in Guangxi.

== History ==
GX Airlines is a joint venture between Tianjin Airlines and the Guangxi Beibu Gulf Investment Group. Tianjin Airlines has a 70% (21 billion yuan) stake and the investment group has a 30% (9 billion yuan) stake in the airline. GX Airlines received its first aircraft, an Embraer 190 leased from Tianjin Airlines, and its air operator's certificate on 1 February 2015.

The airline conducted its first flight on 13 February of the same year, between its base of Nanning and Haikou, Hainan Province.

In November 2015, GX Airlines inducted its first foreign pilots. As of July 2026, the airline has a fleet of eight Embraer 190 aircraft. GX Airlines also plans to begin flights to Hong Kong, Taiwan, Macau and destinations in Northeast and Southeast Asia.

== Destinations ==
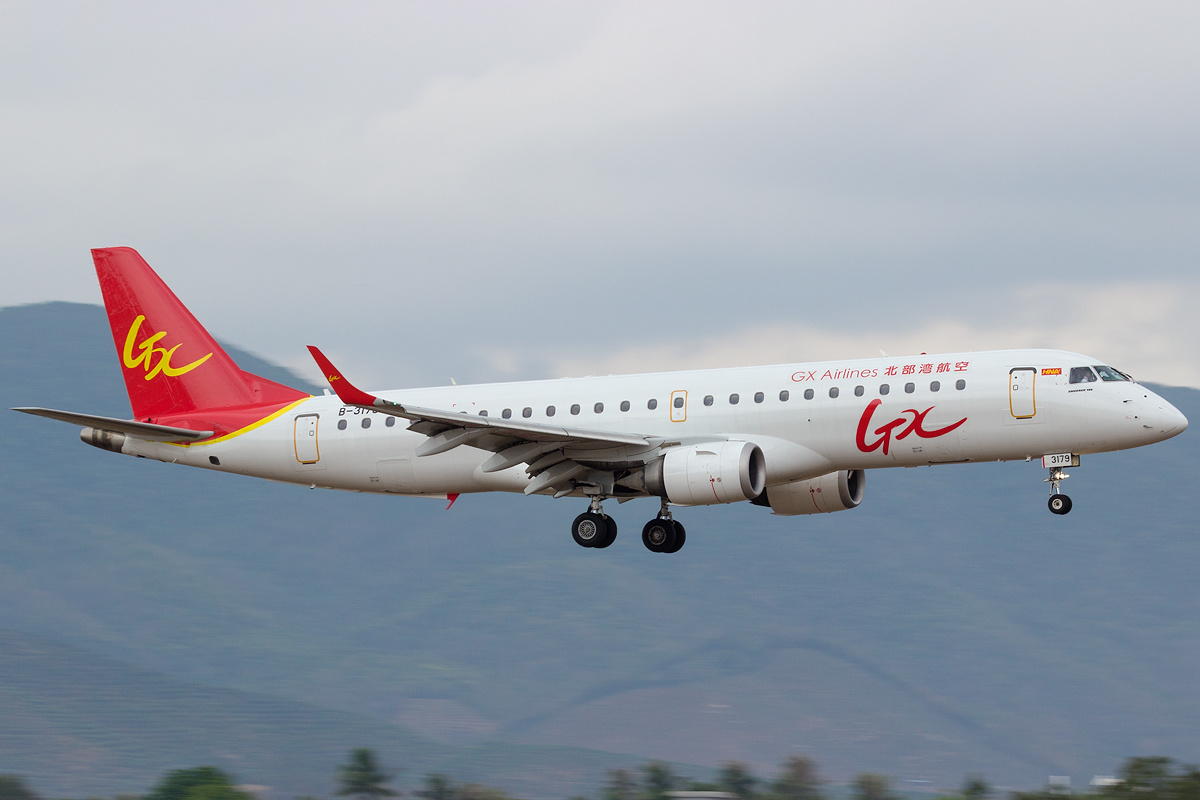
GX Airlines Embraer 190 approaching Sanya Phoenix International Airport

As of June 2026, GX Airlines flies to 59 destinations

- Nanning
- Qingyang
- Lanzhou
- Harbin
- Hohhot
- Xiamen
- Lijiang
- Zhoushan
- Xining
- Heze
- Ordos
- Nanyang
- Jinan
- Xining
- Haikou
- Ordos
- Heze
- Zhoushan

Seasonal:

- Bangkok Suvarnabhumi
- Zhengzhou
- Dalian
- Chengdu Tianfu
- Changsha
- Xuzhou

== Fleet ==
As of August 2025, the GX Airlines fleet consists of the following aircraft:

GX Airlines fleet
Aircraft	In service	Orders	Passengers	Ref.
Airbus A320-200	10	—	174/180	
Airbus A320neo	6	—	186	
Embraer 190	7	—	106	
Total	23	—		
