= Tianjin Airlines =

Chinese airline

Tianjin Airlines 天津航空

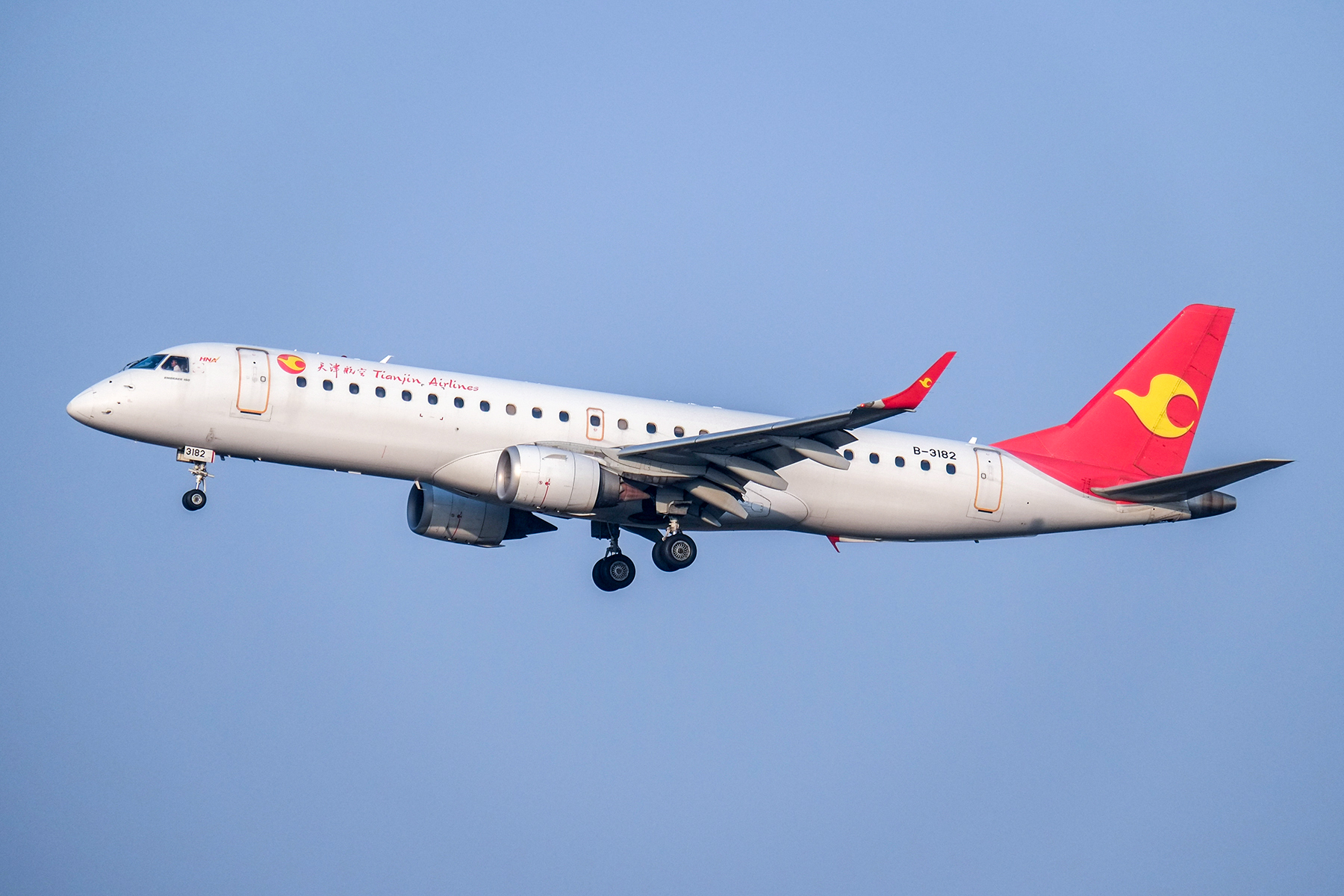
- Tianjin Airlines ERJ 190-100 LR in standard livery
IATA	ICAO	Call sign
GS	GCR	BOHAI
- Founded: 2004; 22 years ago (as Grand China Express Air); June 8, 2009; 17 years ago (Changed name to Tianjin Airlines)
- Commenced operations: 2007; 19 years ago
- Hubs: Tianjin
- Secondary hubs: Haikou; Hohhot; Ürümqi; Xi'an
- Focus cities: Chongqing; Dalian; Guiyang; Nanning
- Frequent-flyer program: Fortune Wings Club
- Subsidiaries: GX Airlines
- Fleet size: 103
- Destinations: 147
- Parent company: HNA Aviation
- Headquarters: Dongli, Tianjin, China
- Website: tianjin-air.com

Tianjin Airlines (Chinese: 天津航空; pinyin: Tiānjīn Hángkōng — formerly Grand China Express Air) is a Chinese airline headquartered in Tianjin Binhai International Airport passenger terminal building, Dongli District, Tianjin, operating domestic scheduled passenger flights out of Tianjin Binhai International Airport.

== History ==
Grand China Air was established in 2004 in an effort to merge the major aviation assets of Hainan Airlines, China Xinhua Airlines, Changan Airlines and Shanxi Airlines, and received its operating licence from the Civil Aviation Administration of China in 2007. Scheduled flights were launched under the brand name Grand China Express Air, using 29-32 seat Fairchild Dornier 328JET aircraft. At that time, the company was China's largest regional airline, operating on 78 routes linking 54 cities. On June 8, 2009, the airline's name was changed to Tianjin Airlines. As of August 2011, 63 destinations are served (excluding those operated on behalf of Hainan Airlines), though by 2012, the airline intends to fly on more than 450 routes linking at least 90 cities, taking more than 90% of the domestic regional aviation market.

In mid 2015, Tianjin Airlines signed a contract for 22 Embraer aircraft (20 Embraer 195s and 2 Embraer 190-E2s). It is part of a larger agreement made in 2014 for 40 aircraft, the remaining 18 to be approved by the Chinese authorities. The first Embraer 195 will be delivered later in 2015 and the first Embraer 190-E2 in 2018.

The airline plans to launch international long-haul services and is to take delivery of its first Airbus A330 aircraft in 2016 to serve destinations in Europe, North America and southeast Asia.

In 2016, Tianjin Airlines launched long-haul services to Auckland in New Zealand, London-Gatwick in the UK and Moscow-Sheremetyevo in Russia. Long-haul services to Melbourne are to begin from October 2017.

In March 2018, Tianjin Airlines has replaced previously planned Xi'an - London Gatwick service to London Heathrow, starting May 7, 2018.

== Destinations ==
Tianjin Airlines is a major player in the regional airline markets of Xinjiang and Inner Mongolia, known for shuttling passengers between the regional capitals to various feeder airports.

=== Codeshare agreements ===
Tianjin Airlines has codeshare agreements with the following airlines:

- Hainan Airlines

== Fleet ==
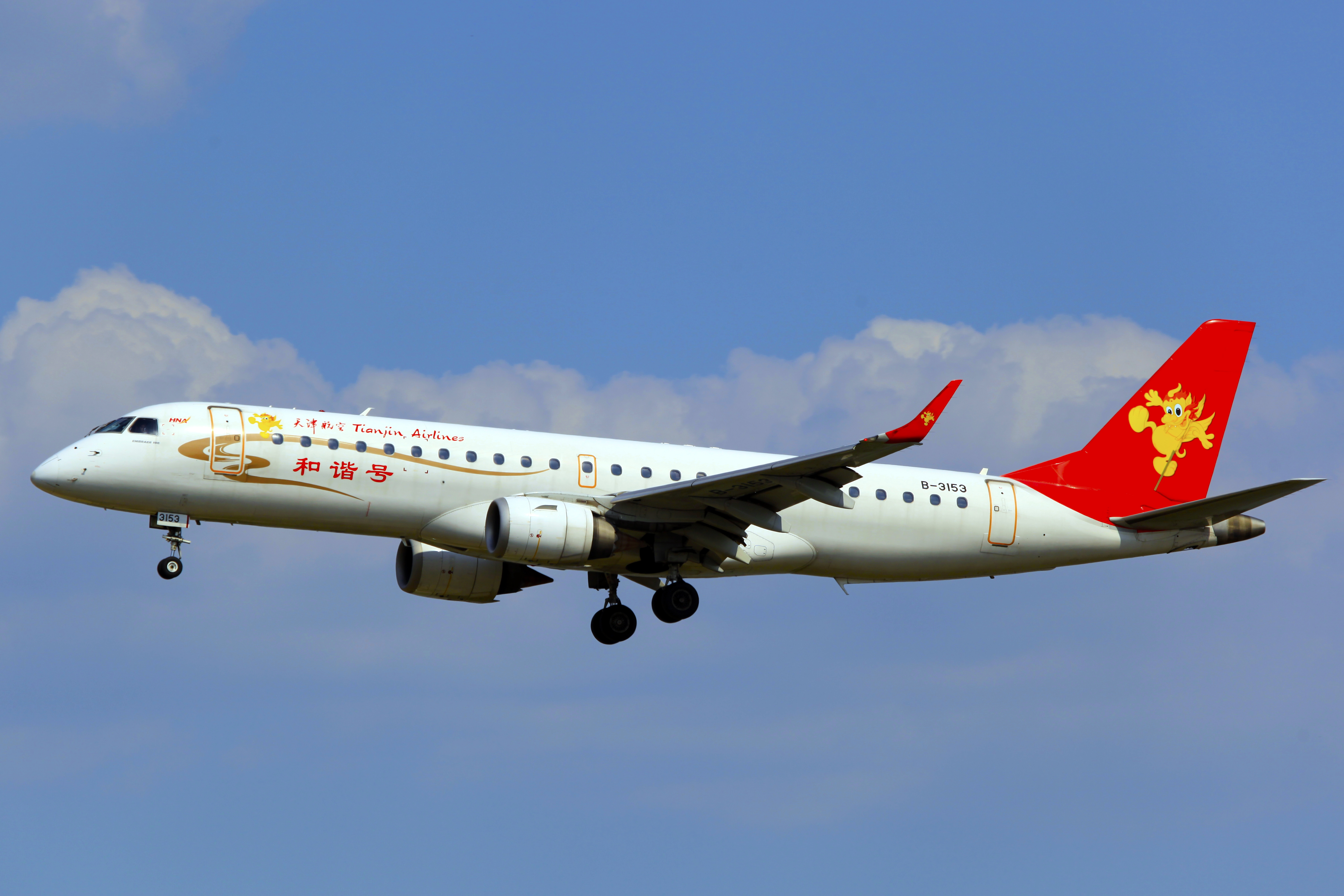
Tianjin Airlines Embraer 190 at Qingdao Liuting International Airport (2013)

As of August 2025, the Tianjin Airlines fleet consists of the following aircraft:

Tianjin Airlines fleet
Aircraft	In Service	Orders	Passengers			Notes
Aircraft	In Service	Orders	J	Y	Total	Notes
Airbus A320-200	27	—	8	150	158	
Airbus A320-200	27	—	—	174	174	
Airbus A320-200	27	—	—	180	180	
Airbus A320neo	15	—	—	174	174	
Airbus A321-200	2	—	—	220	220	
Airbus A321-200	2	—	—	230	230	
Airbus A330-200	4	—	18	242	260	
Embraer 190	38	—	6	92	98	
Embraer 190	38	—	—	106	106	
Embraer 195	17	—	—	122	122	
Embraer 190-E2	—	20	TBA			
Total	103	20				

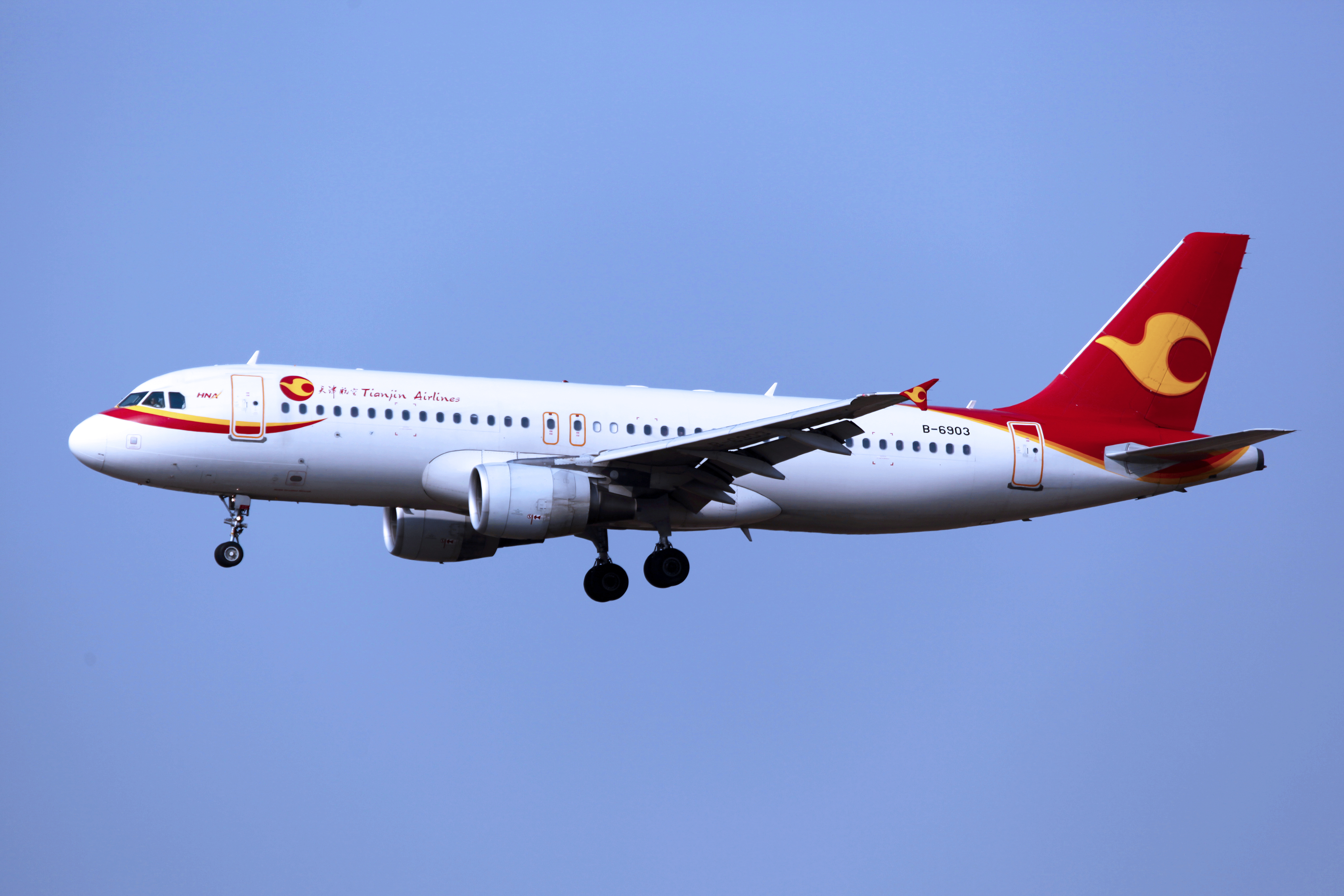
Tianjin Airlines Airbus A320-200 in 2015

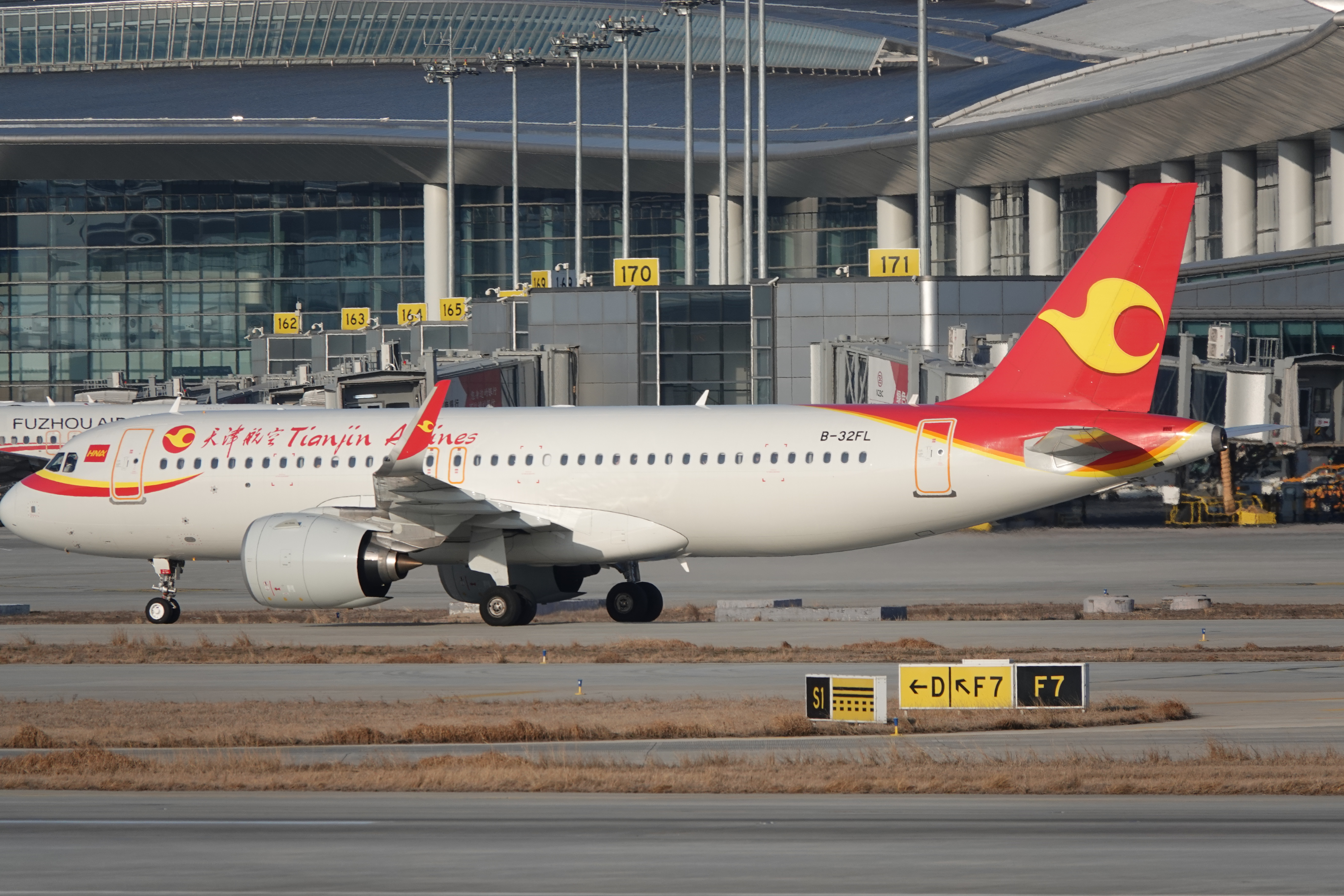
Tianjin Airlines Airbus A320neo in 2024

Tianjin Airlines Airbus A321-200 in 2023

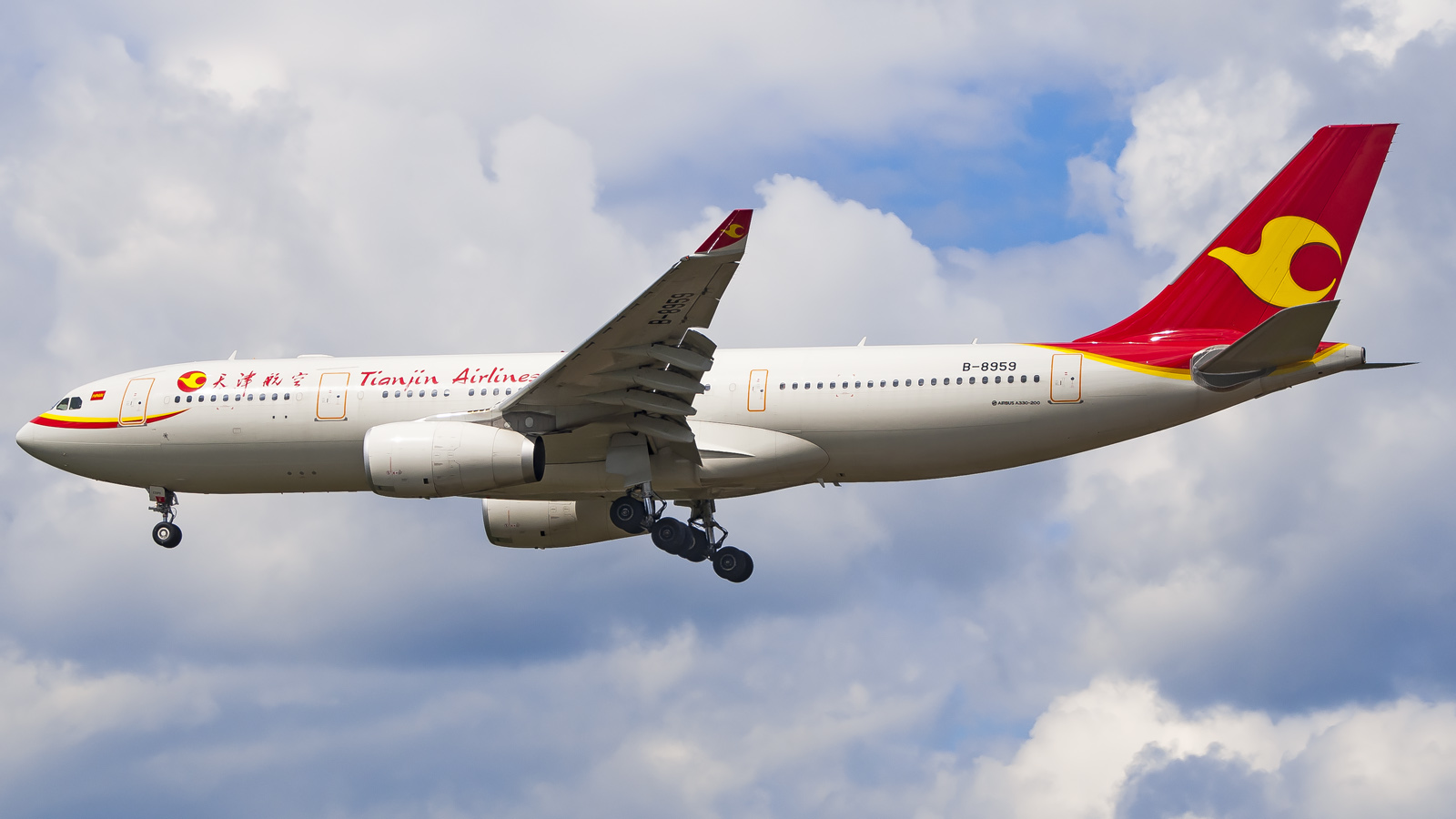
Tianjin Airlines Airbus A330-200 in 2017

Tianjin Airlines Embraer 190 in 2013

Tianjin Airlines Embraer 195 in 2024

=== Fleet history ===
Tianjin Airlines has previously operated the following aircraft:

- Airbus A330-300 (delivered to Hong Kong Airlines)
- Embraer ERJ-145
- Fairchild Dornier 328JET
Tianjin Airlines Airbus A330-300 in 2019

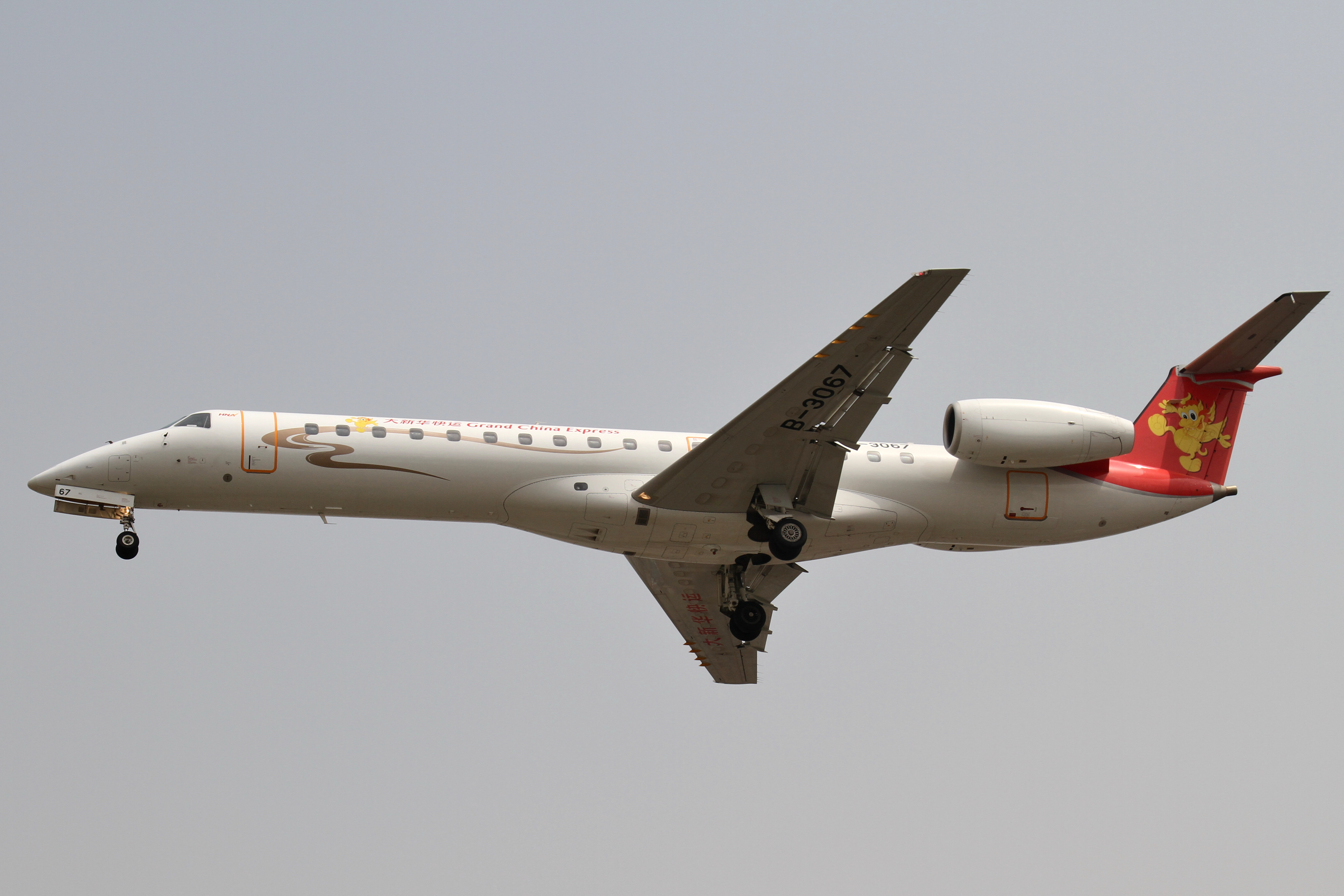
Tianjin Airlines Embraer ERJ-145 in 2010

== Accidents and incidents ==
- On June 29, 2012, there was an attempted hijacking of Tianjin Airlines Flight 7554, an Embraer ERJ-190, by six ethnic Uyghur men. Passengers and crew overpowered the hijackers. The aircraft returned to Hotan at 12:45 pm, where 11 passengers and crew and two hijackers were treated for injuries. Two hijackers died of injuries they sustained during the fight on the aircraft. This marked the first serious hijacking attempt in China since 1990.
