= Putuo District =

Putuo District (普陀区) is the name of two districts. It may refer to:

- Putuo District, Shanghai
- Putuo District, Zhoushan, Zhejiang

== See also ==
- Putao District, Kachin State, Burma
- Putuo (disambiguation)
