= Dongji =

Dongji may refer to:

- Dongzhi (solar term)
- Dongji Island, Wangan Township, Penghu County (the Pescadores), Taiwan (Republic of China)
- Dongji, Shandong (董集镇), town in and subdivision of Kenli District, Dongying, Shandong, China
- Dongji, Zhejiang (东极镇), town in and subdivision of Putuo District, Zhouhai, Zhejiang, China

== See also ==
- Fuyuan Dongji Airport, Heilongjiang
