= Putuo =

Putuo is the Chinese rendering of Sanskrit Potalaka. It may refer to the following places in China:

- Mount Putuo, one of the four Buddhist holy mountains of China
- Putuo District, Zhoushan, Zhejiang Province: location of Mount Putuo
- Putuo District, Shanghai
- Putuo Zongcheng Temple, in Chengde, Hebei Province
- South Putuo Temple, in Xiamen, Fujian Province
