= Trans Island Limousine Service =

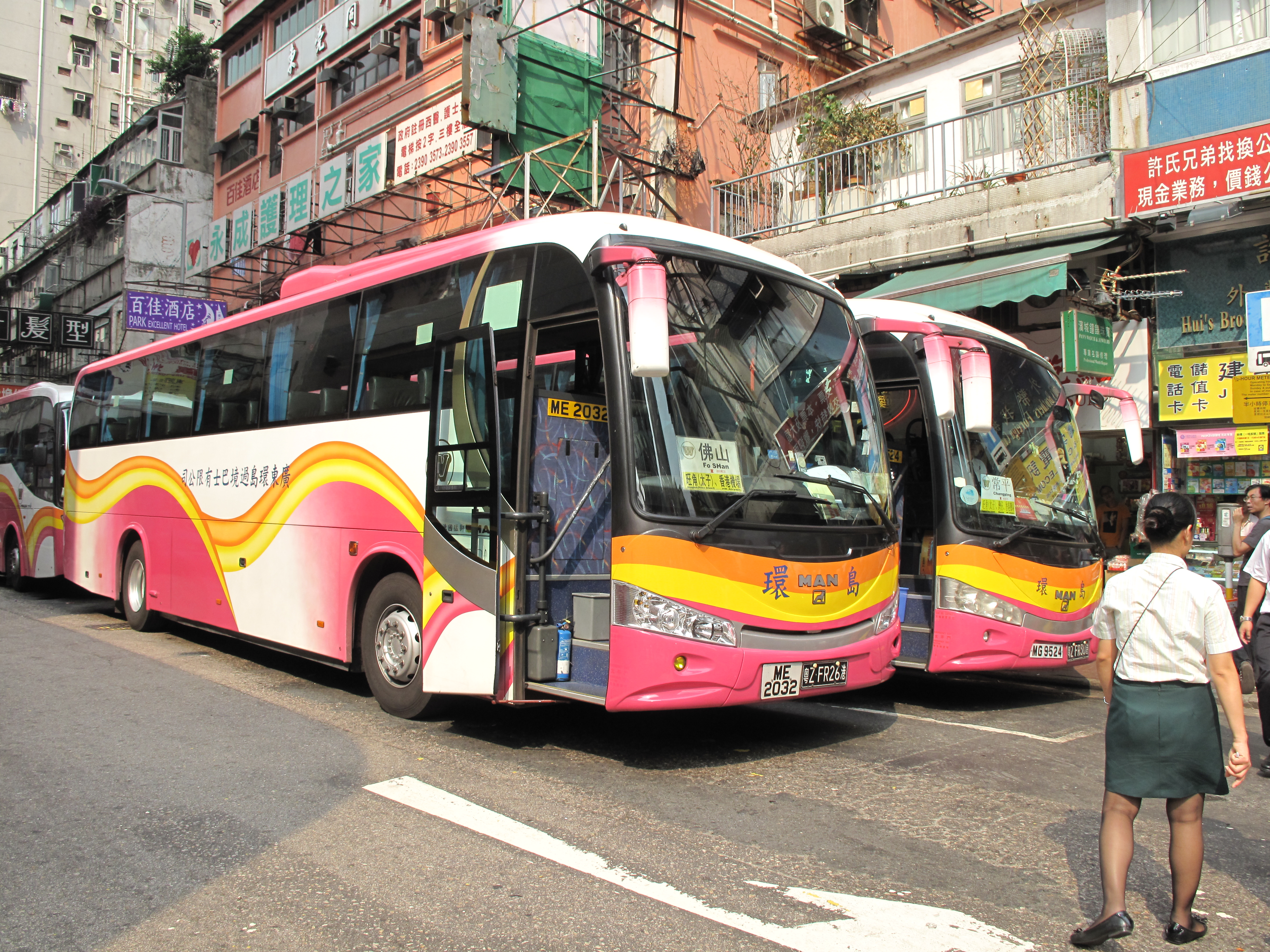
Located Prince Edward, Hong Kong

Trans Island Limousine Service Ltd (a.k.a. TIL) is a subsidiary of Kwoon Chung Bus Company. It is the main cross-boundary bus company in Hong Kong. The company was established in 1973, providing cross boundary coach service between Hong Kong and Guangdong Province, China/Shenzhen International Airport. From 2010, TIL worked with SZIA to provide up-stream check-in services for passengers taking a flight from SZIA in Hong Kong. Up-stream check-in service is available in a number of TIL ticketing centers, including Mong Kok (Prince Edward), Tsim Sha Tsui, Kowloon Tong, Sheung Wan and Shenzhen Bay Port.

== Introduction ==
=== Coach Service ===
Trans Island Limousine Service Ltd uses the following brands to provide cross boundary services:

- Trans Island Chinalink for services from Hong Kong to Guangdong Province, China
- Kwoon Chung Trans Island Shenzhen Airport Link for services from Hong Kong to Shenzhen International Airport.
- GoGo TIL for services from Hong Kong International Airport to Guangdong Province, China and Shenzhen International Airport.

=== Limousine Service ===
Inter-Continental Hire Care Ltd was established in 1968 as a subsidiary of Trans Island Limousine Service Ltd. The main business of IHC is providing cross boundary limousine and coach private hiring service, and is branded "Limo Club". It also provides hotel shuttle service from Hong Kong International Airport to most of the hotels in Hong Kong. It is under the brand of "Airport Hotelink". It is the sole operator providing shuttle services to hotels from HKIA.

Blackbird Worldwide is a premier global ground transportation company that offers an array of premium services to clients worldwide. With their strong reputation for quality service, they have now expanded their operations to Hong Kong.

== Routes to Guangdong Province ==
Stops in Hong Kong:

- Mongkok (Prince Edward)
- Tsim Sha Tsui
- Sheung Wan
- Causeway Bay

Stops in Guangdong:

- Chaoyang
- Foshan
- Guangzhou
- Huadu
- Kaiping
- Shenzhen OCT East
- Panyu District
- Shenzhen Bay Port
- Shenzhen International Airport
- Shunde District
- Taishan
- Nan Ao
- Xinhui
- Yangjiang
- Zhongshan

== Route to Shenzhen Bay Port ==
- From Hong Kong to Shenzhen
  - Mongkok (Prince Edward)
  - Tsim Sha Tsui
  - Sheung Wan
  - Causeway Bay
  - Ocean Park Hong Kong
- From Shenzhen to Hong Kong drop off point
  - Mongkok (Prince Edward)
  - Mongkok (Langham Place)
  - Yau Ma Tei
  - Jordan
  - Tsim Sha Tsui (Harbour City)
  - Sheung Wan
  - Central
  - Wan Chai
  - Causeway Bay
  - Hong Kong Ocean Park
  - Hong Kong Disneyland Resort
  - Hong Kong International Airport

== Route to Shenzhen Airport ==
- From Hong Kong to Shenzhen
  - Mongkok (Prince Edward)
  - Tsim Sha Tsui
  - Kowloon Tong
  - Sheung Wan
  - Wan Chai
  - Causeway Bay
  - Ocean Park Hong Kong
  - Shenzhen Bay Port
  - Huanggang Port Control Point
- From Shenzhen to Hong Kong drop off point
  - Mongkok (Prince Edward)
  - Mongkok (Langham Place)
  - Yau Ma Tei
  - Jordan
  - Tsim Sha Tsui (Harbour City)
  - Sheung Wan
  - Central
  - Wan Chai
  - Causeway Bay
  - Hong Kong Ocean Park
  - Hong Kong Disneyland Resort
  - Hong Kong International Airport
