= Zhoushan Putuoshan International Airport =

Zhoushan Putuoshan International Airport 舟山普陀山国际机场
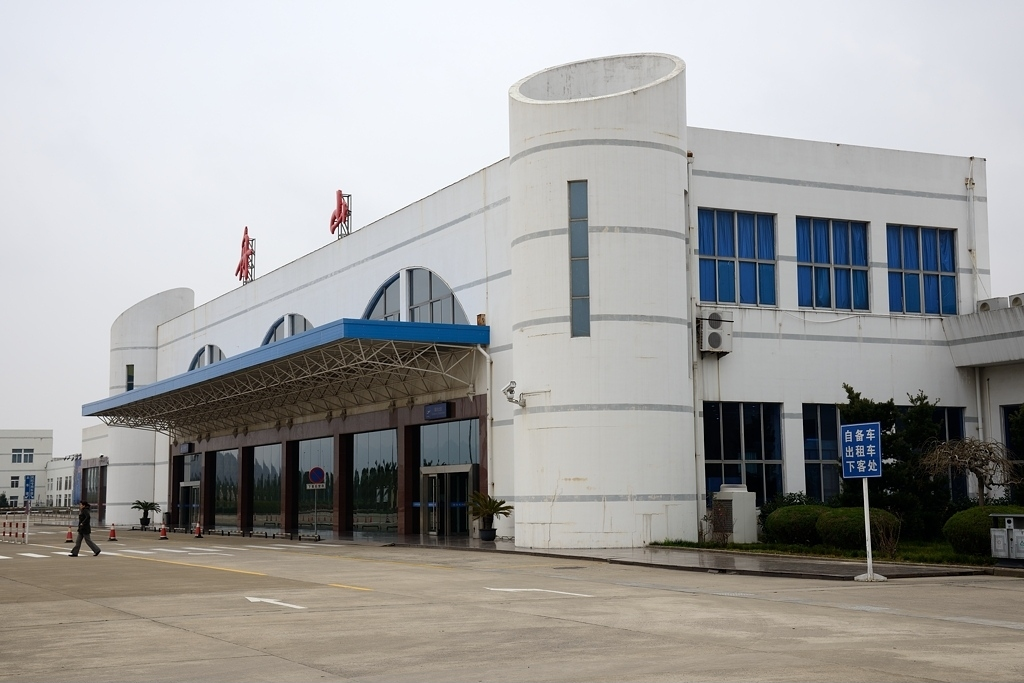
- Terminal building
- IATA: HSN; ICAO: ZSZS

Summary
- Airport type: Public/Military
- Serves: Zhoushan, Zhejiang
- Location: Zhujiajian Island, Putuo District
- Elevation AMSL: 1.8 m (5.9 ft)
- Coordinates: 29°56′03″N 122°21′44″E
- Website: zsairport.com.cn

Maps
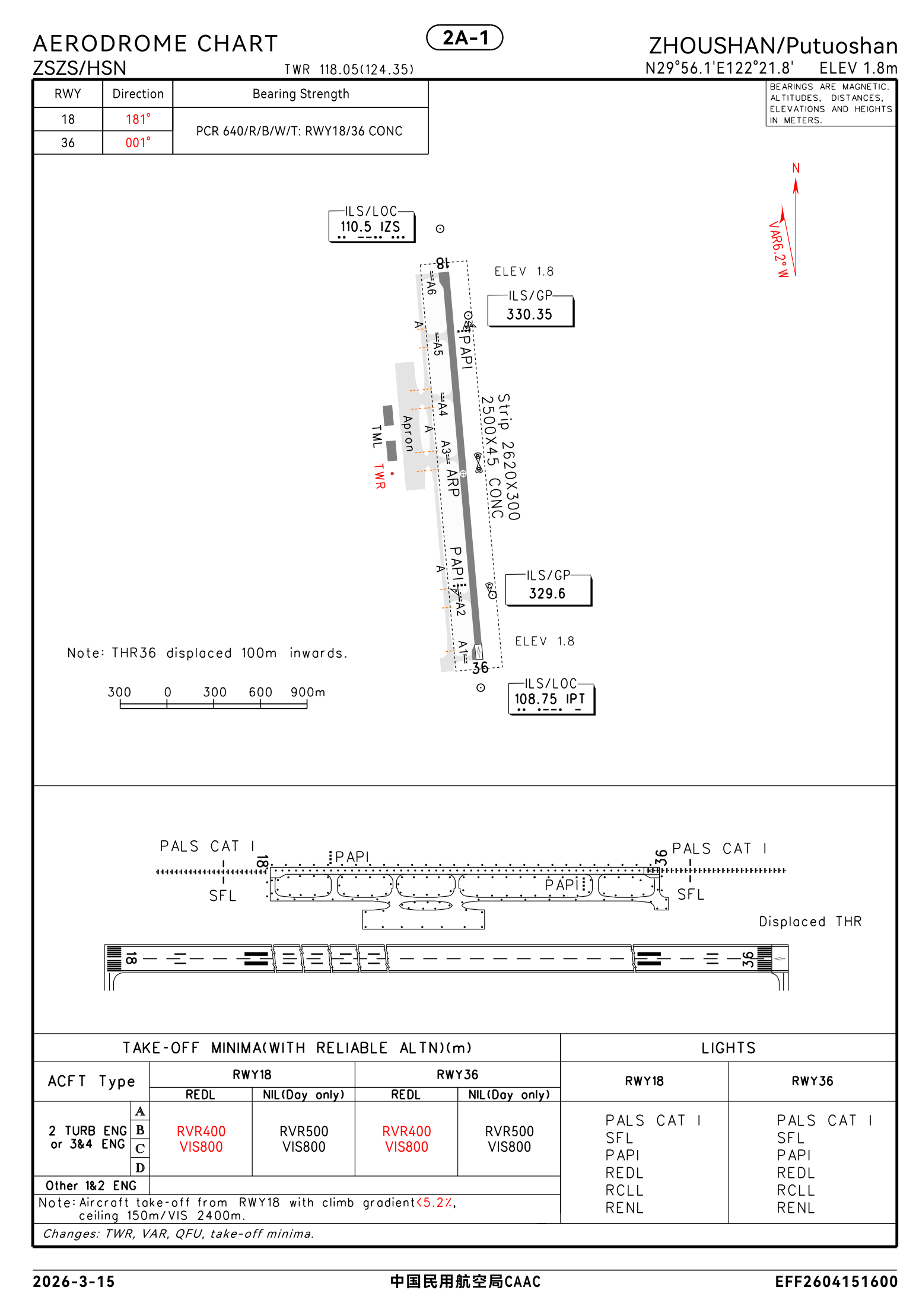
- CAAC airport chart

- Location in Zhejiang HSN/ZSZS (China)

Runways
Direction	Length		Surface
Direction	m	ft	Surface
18/36	2,500	8,202	Concrete

Statistics (2025)
- Passengers: 2,888,463
- Aircraft movements: 4,908.2
- Cargo (metric tons): 30,468
- Source: CAAC

Zhoushan Putuoshan International Airport
- Simplified Chinese: 舟山普陀山国际机场
- Traditional Chinese: 舟山普陀山國際機場
Transcriptions
Standard Mandarin
- Hanyu Pinyin: Zhōushān Pǔtuóshān Guójì Jīchǎng

Zhoushan Putuoshan International Airport (IATA: HSN, ICAO: ZSZS) is an airport situated on Zhujiajian Island in Zhoushan, Zhejiang, China. Construction originally started following an agreement signed 19 January 1994 in Zhoushan, between Zhoushan Civil Aviation Airport Construction, Zhejiang Province and the Asian Pacific Development Corporation.

== History ==
In 1988, the proposal to build an airport on Zhujiajian Island was approved by the State Council and the Central Military Commission. The selected site lay near the state‑owned Shuguang Farm in the central part of Zhujiajian Island. Construction formally began after an agreement was signed on 19 January 1994, and the airport, originally named Zhoushan Zhujiajian Airport, opened to traffic in August 1997.

In March 1988, with approval from the State Council and the Central Military Commission, the Zhoushan Municipal Government decided to build a new civil airport on Zhujiajian Island, selecting a site near the Shuguang Farm. The facility was named Zhoushan Zhujiajian Airport. Construction began in January 1995 and was completed at the end of March 1997, with a total investment of approximately 380 million yuan. The airport held its inaugural flight ceremony on 28 July 1997 and officially opened to traffic on 8 August, launching its first routes to Shanghai and Xiamen.

The airport occupies roughly 3,004 mu (亩) of land, with an elevation of 1.8 meters, a PCN of 53, a 2,500‑meter runway, a 52,000‑square‑meter apron, and a 6,400‑square‑meter terminal building. In April 1998, the airport was officially renamed Zhoushan Putuoshan Airport. Its airfield classification was upgraded from 3C to 4C in July 1998, and further to 4D in December 1999.

In November 2012, the East China Regional Administration of the Civil Aviation Administration of China approved the Master Plan for Zhoushan Putuoshan Airport. The plan designated a long‑term airfield rating of 4D, suitable for large aircraft such as the Boeing 767 and Airbus A300.

- Near‑term plan (to 2020): capacity for 2 million passengers, 10,000 tons of cargo, and 25,419 annual aircraft movements; a 3,000‑square‑meter terminal; and 12 aircraft stands.
- Long‑term plan (to 2040): capacity for 5 million passengers, 28,000 tons of cargo, and 56,692 annual movements; terminal expansion to 52,500 square meters; and 22 aircraft stands.

On 2 December 2014, annual passenger throughput surpassed 500,000, marking the airport’s entry into the category of medium‑sized civil airports. By November 2014, Zhoushan Airport operated 12 direct routes serving 11 cities.

On 12 March 2017, officials from the Zhoushan Aviation Industrial Park Construction Headquarters announced at the Putuoshan Airport expansion site on Zhujiajian that the Zhoushan Aviation Industrial Park would be developed as "one park, two zones."

- The aircraft manufacturing zone is located on Zhujiajian Island.
- The components manufacturing zone is located in the Zhoushan Economic Development Zone in northern Zhoushan Island.

The Zhujiajian aircraft manufacturing zone covers 7.88 square kilometers, divided into a trunk‑aircraft manufacturing area, general‑aviation manufacturing area, aviation‑supporting area, and an airport bonded zone. The Boeing facilities are located in the trunk‑aircraft manufacturing area and consist of two parts:

1. The Boeing–COMAC joint‑venture 737 Completion Center, and
2. The Boeing‑owned 737 Delivery Center, located adjacent to it.

According to the plan, the joint venture handles interior installation, painting, maintenance, delivery support, and related services for the 737 MAX series. At full capacity, the center can deliver up to 100 aircraft per year and create 2,000 jobs.

On 15 December 2018, the Boeing Zhoushan 737 Completion and Delivery Center—jointly established by Boeing and COMAC—delivered its first aircraft, which was received by Air China.

In 2023, Putuoshan Airport surpassed 2 million passengers for the first time and completed its expansion project. In October of the same year, the airport passed the national inspection for port‑of‑entry opening, gaining international aviation capabilities. On 7 March 2024, with approval from the Civil Aviation Administration of China, the airport was officially renamed Zhoushan Putuoshan International Airport. Following the renaming, the airport plans to launch its first international route to Hong Kong.

== Military use ==
The airport is used as a Coast Guard Air Station by the China Coast Guard's 1st Aviation Group, which is part of the East China Sea Bureau.

== Airlines and destinations ==
The following airlines serve the airport with scheduled flights:

Airlines	Destinations
Air Travel	Changsha, Kunming
Chengdu Airlines	Chengdu–Tianfu, Chizhou
China Eastern Airlines	Wuhan, Xiamen, Yantai
China Express Airlines	Anqing, Changsha, Chongqing, Ganzhou, Huai'an, Jining, Lianyungang, Linyi, Lishui, Nanchang, Quzhou, Taiyuan, Wenzhou, Xuzhou, Yancheng, Yangzhou, Zhengzhou
China Southern Airlines	Guangzhou, Jieyang
China United Airlines	Beijing–Daxing, Foshan
Colorful Guizhou Airlines	Lishui
Donghai Airlines	Changchun, Shenyang, Shenzhen
Fuzhou Airlines	Dalian, Fuzhou, Harbin, Tianjin, Xiamen
Greater Bay Airlines	Hong Kong
GX Airlines	Changsha
Qingdao Airlines	Qingdao, Quanzhou
Shandong Airlines	Jinan, Qingdao, Quanzhou, Xiamen
Shanghai Airlines	Jieyang, Zhengzhou
Shenzhen Airlines	Quanzhou, Zhengzhou
Sichuan Airlines	Chengdu–Tianfu, Chongqing, Dazhou, Nanchang
West Air	Chongqing, Fuyang
XiamenAir	Quanzhou, Xiamen

== See also ==
- List of airports in the People's Republic of China
