= Shenzhen Bao'an International Airport =

Airport serving Shenzhen, Guangdong, China

Shenzhen Bao'an International Airport 深圳宝安国际机场

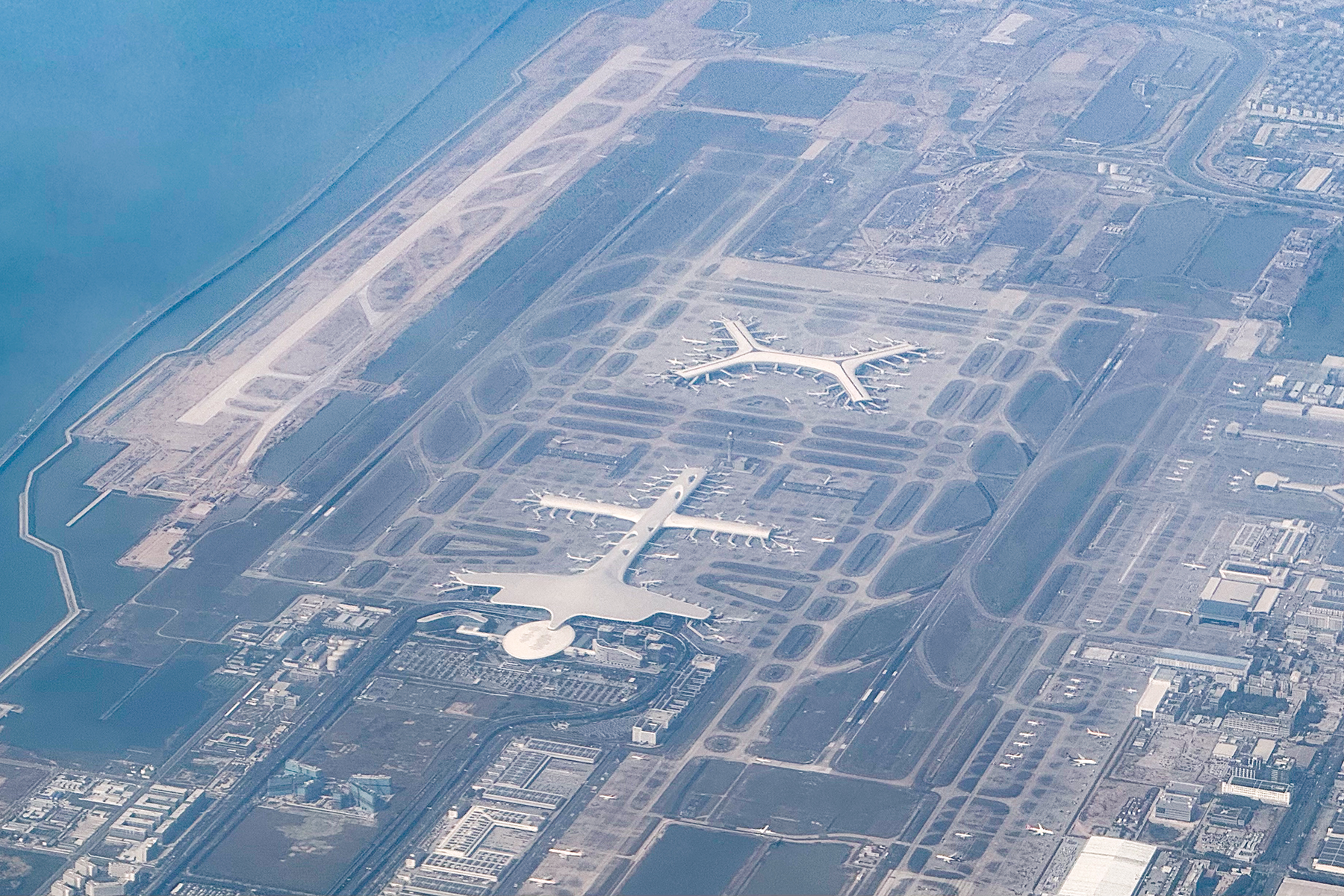
- Aerial view of Shenzhen Bao'an International Airport
- IATA: SZX; ICAO: ZGSZ

Summary
- Airport type: Public
- Owner/Operator: Shenzhen Airport Company Ltd.
- Serves: Pearl River Delta
- Location: Bao'an, Shenzhen, Guangdong, China
- Opened: 12 October 1991; 35 years ago
- Hub for: China Southern Airlines; Donghai Airlines; Hainan Airlines; SF Airlines; Shenzhen Airlines; UPS Airlines
- Focus city for: Air China
- Elevation AMSL: 4 m (13 ft)
- Coordinates: 22°38′22″N 113°48′39″E
- Website: szairport.com

Maps
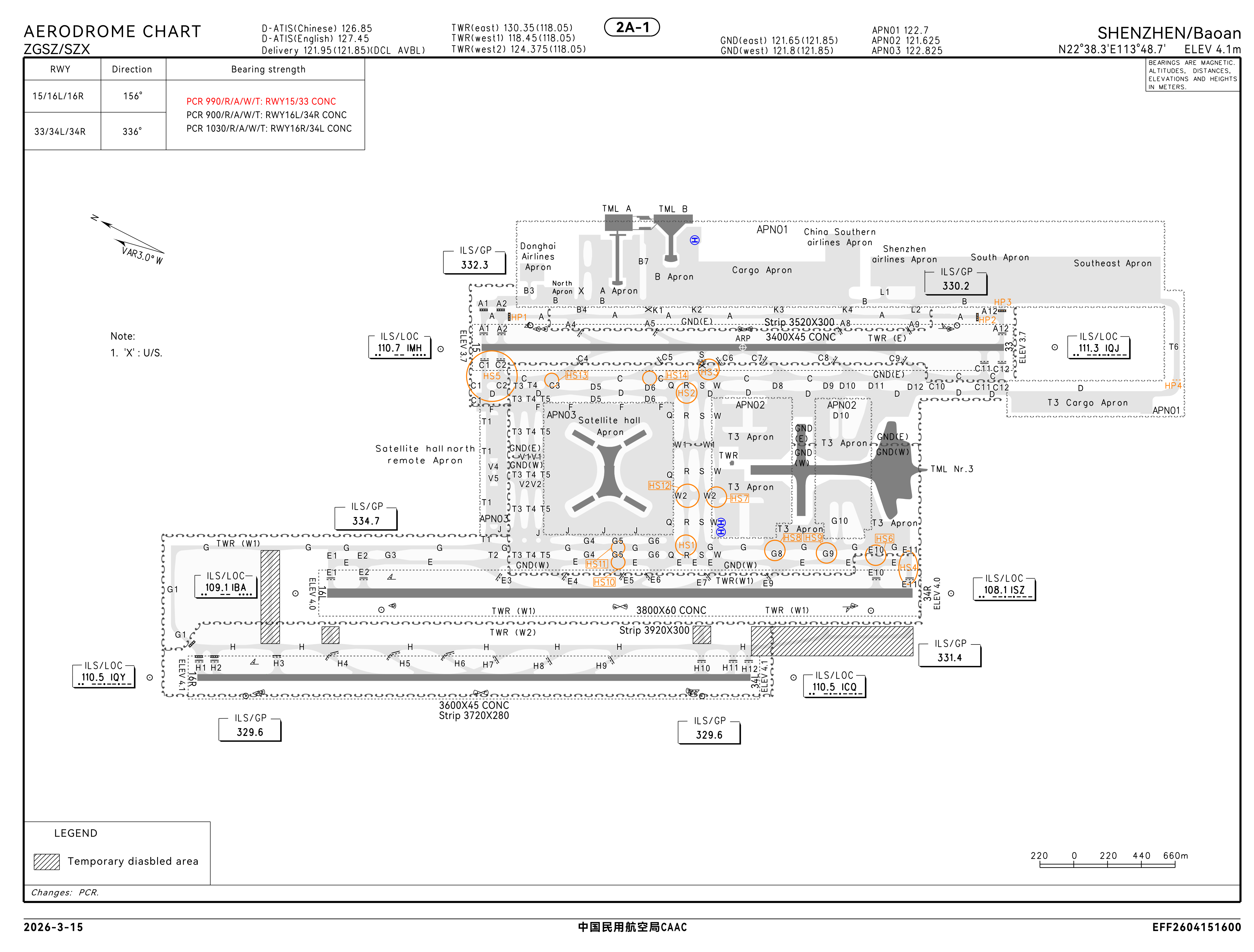
- CAAC aerodrome chart

- Location in Guangdong Location in China

Runways
| Direction | Length | | Surface |
| Direction | m | ft | Surface |
|---|---|---|---|
| 15/33 | 3,400 | 11,155 | Concrete |
| 16L/34R | 3,800 | 12,467 | Concrete |
| 16R/34L | 3,600 | 11,811 | Concrete |

Statistics (2025)
- Passengers: 66,485,213 ▲8.1%
- Aircraft movements: 448,019 ▲4.6%
- Tonnes of cargo: 2,050,835.9 ▲9.0%
- Source:, List of the busiest airports in China

Shenzhen Bao'an International Airport
- Simplified Chinese: 深圳宝安国际机场
- Traditional Chinese: 深圳寶安國際機場
Transcriptions
Standard Mandarin
- Hanyu Pinyin: Shēnzhèn Bǎo'ān Guójì Jīchǎng
- Wade–Giles: Shen^{1}-chen^{4} Pao^{1}-an^{1} Kuo^{2}-chi^{4} Chi^{1}-chʻang^{3}
- Yale Romanization: Shen1 jen4 Gwo2 ji4 Ji1 chang3
Yue: Cantonese
- Jyutping: sam^{1}zan^{3} bou^{2}on^{1} Gwok^{3}zai^{3} Gei^{1}coeng^{4}

Shenzhen Bao'an International Airport (IATA: SZX, ICAO: ZGSZ) — formerly Shenzhen Huangtian Airport (until 2001) — is an international airport serving the city of Shenzhen in South Central China's Guangdong province. It is on the east bank of the Pearl River in Bao'an District, 32 km (20 mi) northwest of the city centre. It is a hub for Shenzhen Airlines, China Southern Airlines and Donghai Airlines and for cargo airline SF Airlines while serving as a focus city for Hainan Airlines. The airport also serves as an Asian-Pacific cargo hub for UPS Airlines. The airport underwent major expansions in the 2010s, with a second runway opening in 2011, and a new terminal in 2013. On 29 November 2025, a third runway officially opened.

It is one of the three largest airports serving the Pearl River Delta, alongside Hong Kong International Airport and Guangzhou Baiyun International Airport. The airport has direct ferry routes to Hong Kong International Airport, where passengers can transit without going through immigration and custom checks.

== History ==
The airport was opened on 12 October 1991. It occupies an area of 10.8 km^{2} (2,700 acres). Its first runway is 3400 m long and 45 m wide, and it has 53 parking spaces on its apron. Shenzhen airport handled 52,734,934 passengers in 2023, according to Civil Aviation Administration of China, making it the fourth-busiest airport in mainland China. The airport was also the world's twenty-fourth busiest and the twentieth-busiest airport in terms of cargo traffic, registering 1,600,347.7 tonnes of freight in 2023. In terms of passenger movements, Shenzhen airport was the 5th busiest airport in China in 2018. Air China launched the first intercontinental air route out of Shenzhen, to Frankfurt Airport, Germany, on 21 May 2016.

=== Former terminals ===
Terminal A and B primarily served domestic flights. Terminal D, the international terminal, was opened in December 2008. It had no air gates of its own, just airside bus service to distant positions around the airport. These terminals covered an area of 152,000 square meters (1,640,000 sq ft) and consisted of 24 jetways. All three former terminals were closed on 27 November 2013, with the brand new replacement Terminal 3 opening the following day.

=== Current terminal ===
At the beginning of 2008 the 1.6 km (0.99 mi) long new terminal commenced being built as one of main works for the 2011 Summer Universiade. Designed by the architectural firm Studio Fuksas, this new terminal building was called "Terminal 3" from the beginning of construction until its formal opening. Soon after the decision of the closure of Terminals A, B and D, "Terminal 3" was renamed as it was the only terminal building in operation. The terminal was opened on 28 November 2013 after four years of planning and construction.

Terminal 3 covers an area of 450,000 square meters with 6 floors (4 are above and 2 are underground). Dubbed by locals as the "giant flying fish", the terminal is a key traffic hub in the Pearl River Delta region. With 63 boarding gates, the terminal will handle approximately 14,000 passengers per hour during peak traffic and designed to handle 45 million passengers per year

Current terminal
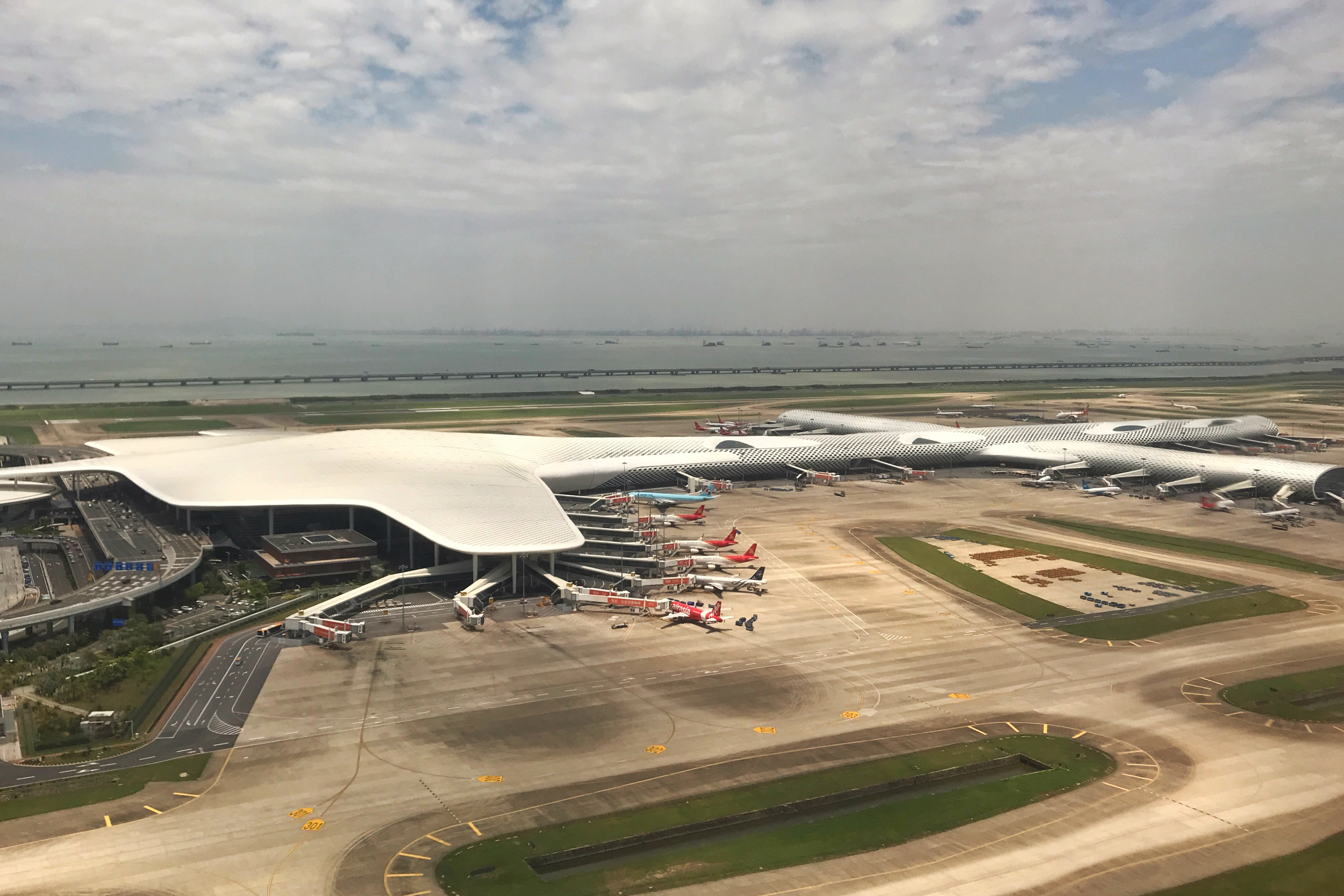
Aerial view

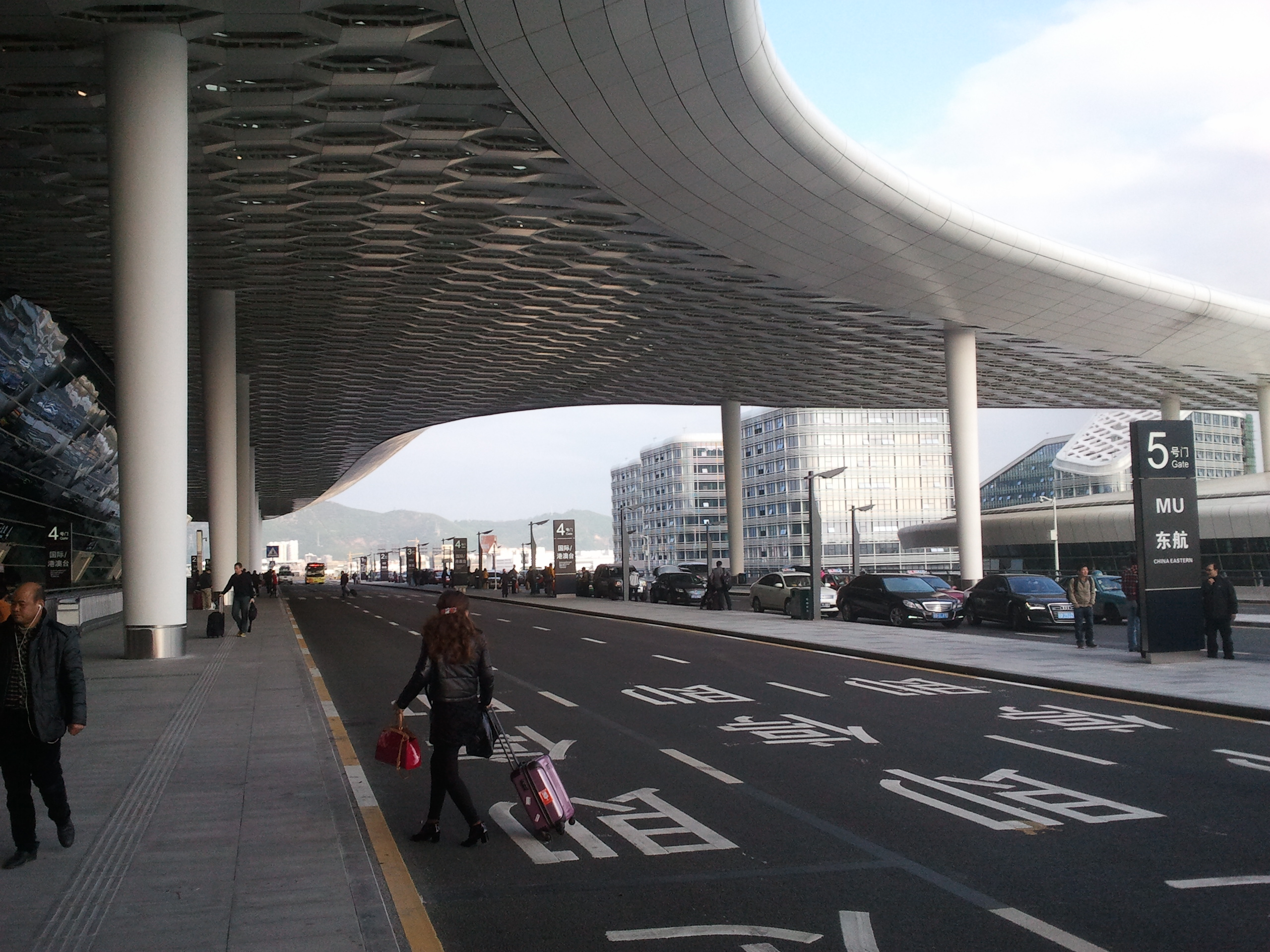
Departure drop-off

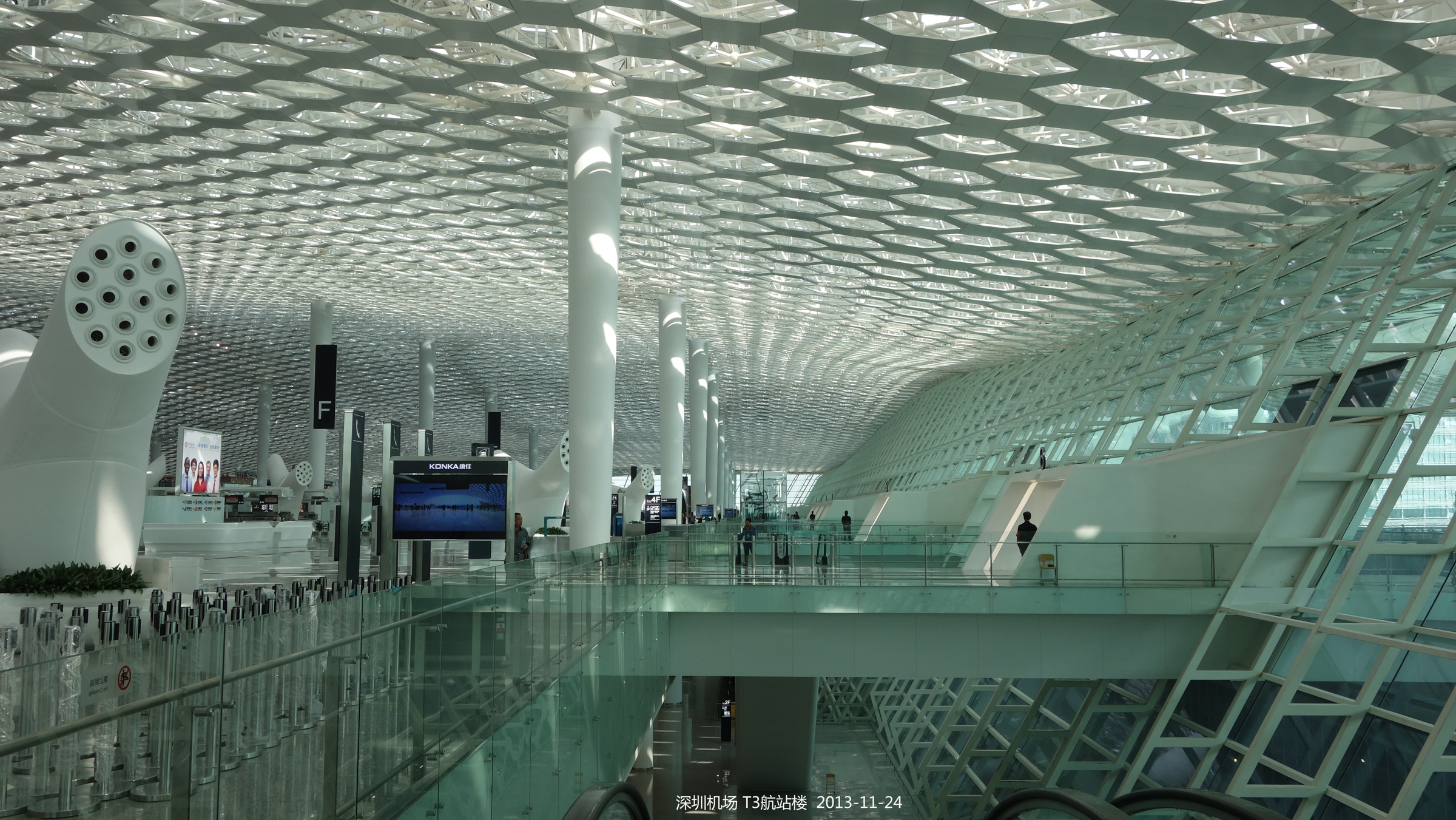
Departure hall entrance

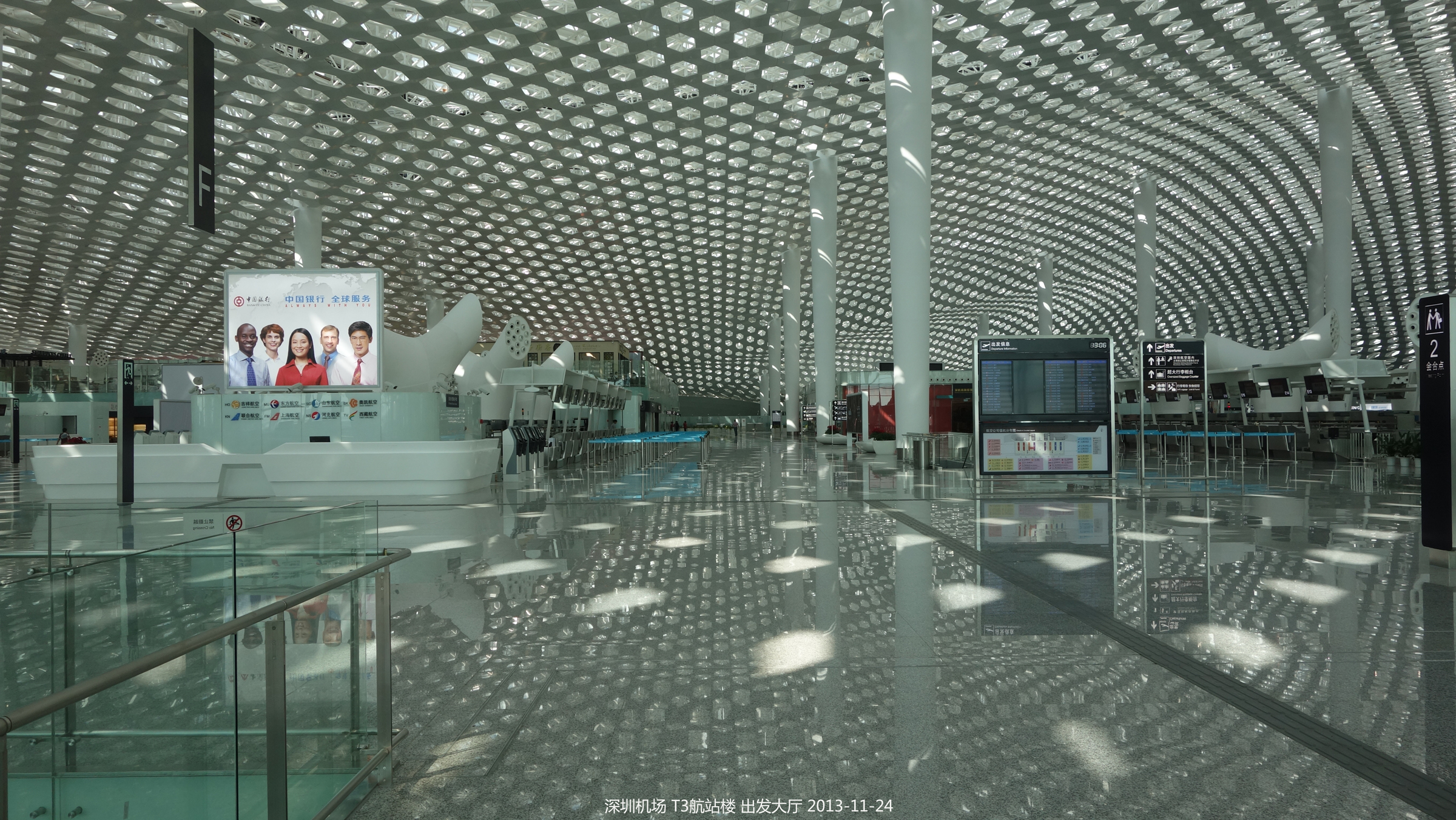
Departure hall

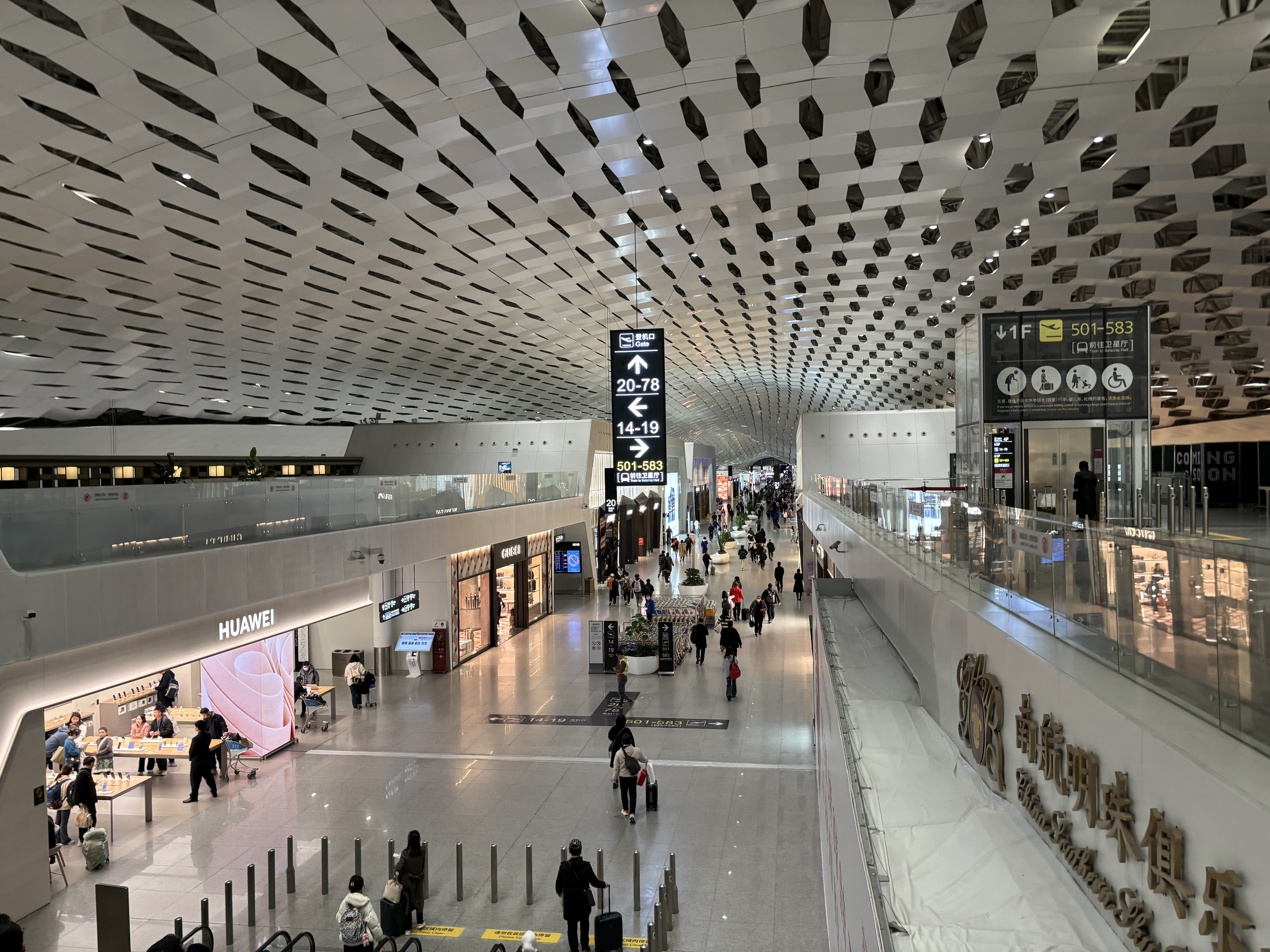
Domestic concourse

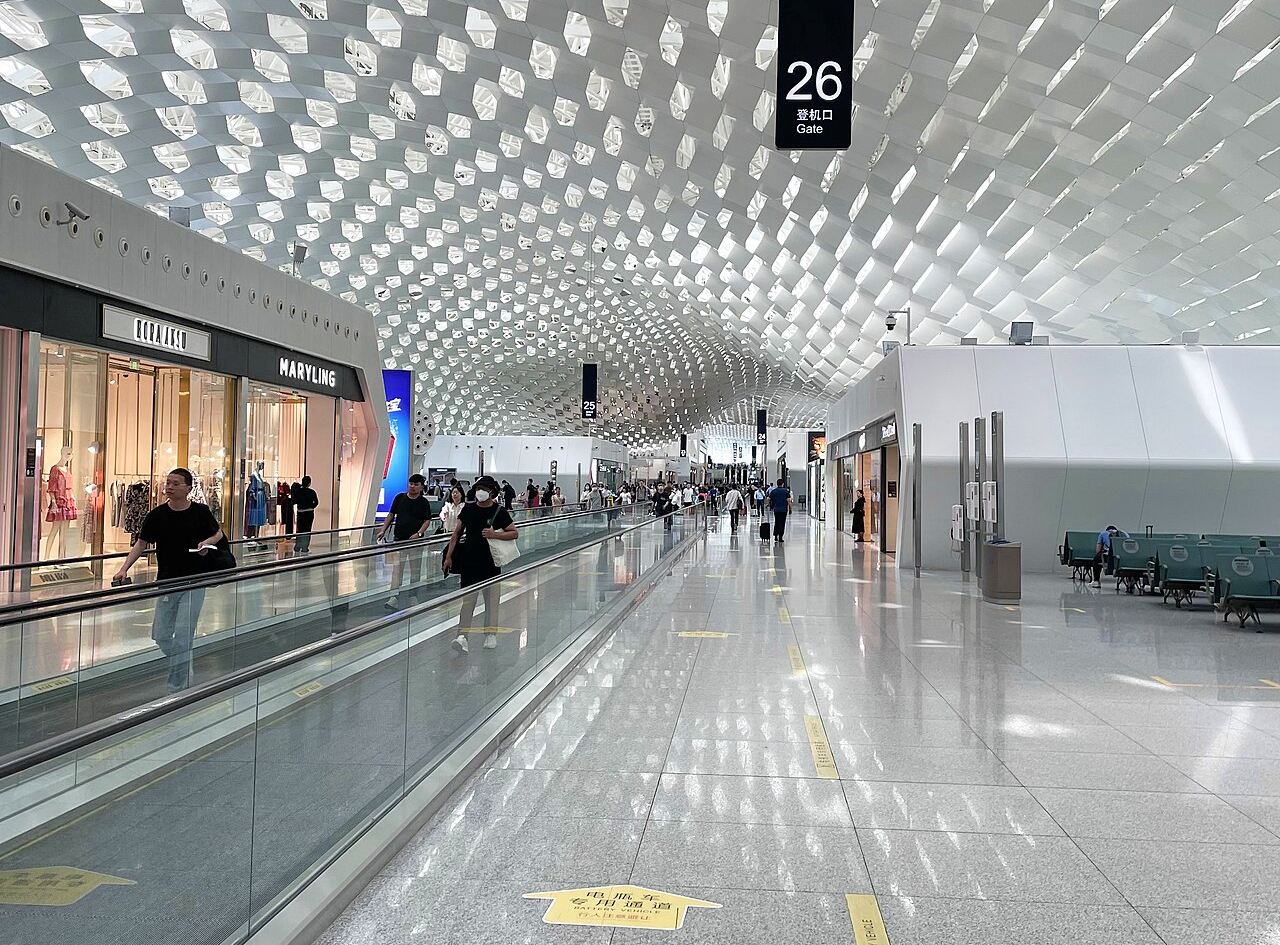
Domestic concourse

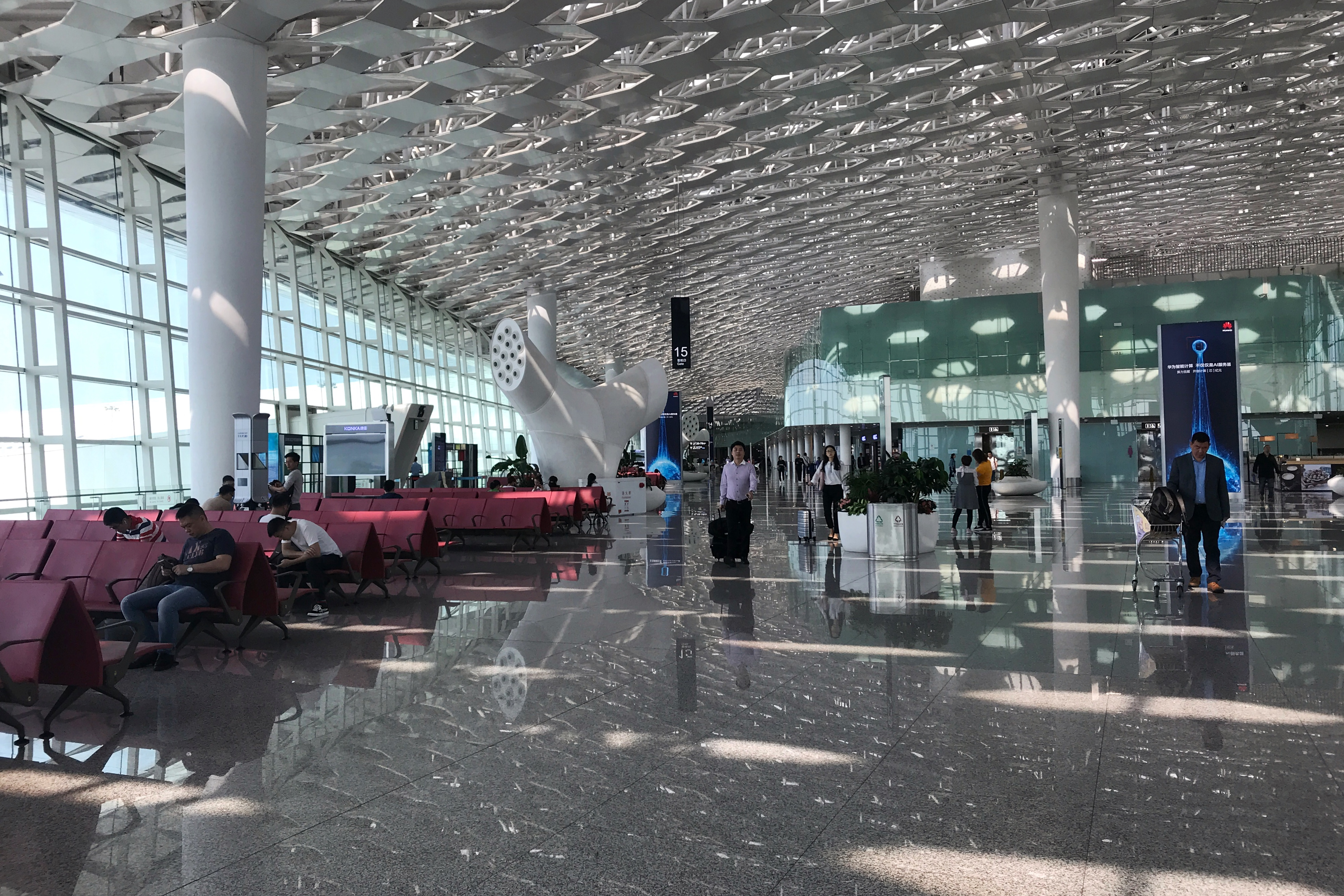
Domestic gates

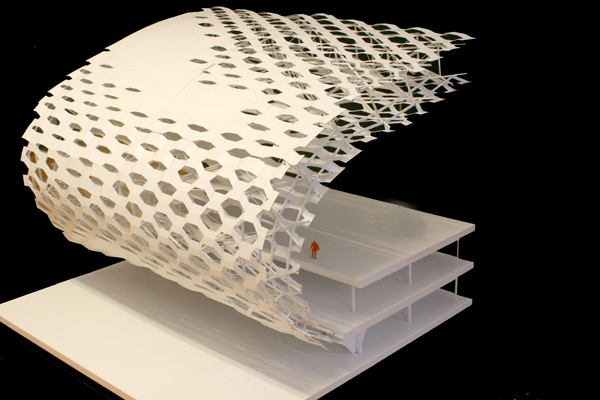
Parametric developed structure and facade

=== Further expansions ===
A new satellite concourse, designed by Aedas, opened in December 2021. It is located directly to the north of the existing Terminal 3 building and is designed with a capacity of 22 million passengers per year. It is directly connected to the main terminal by an automated people mover (APM) system.

Satellite concourse
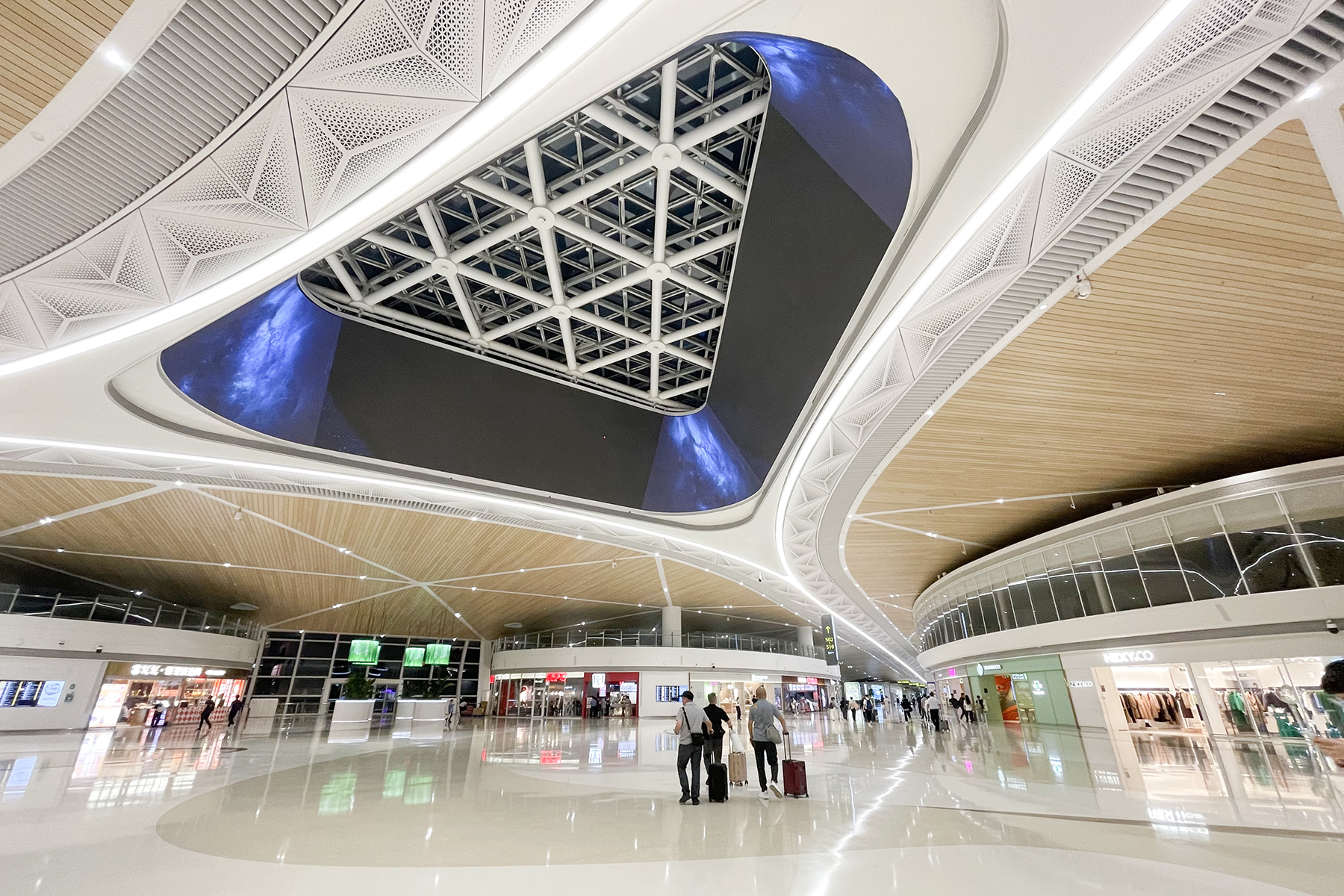
Satellite concourse hall

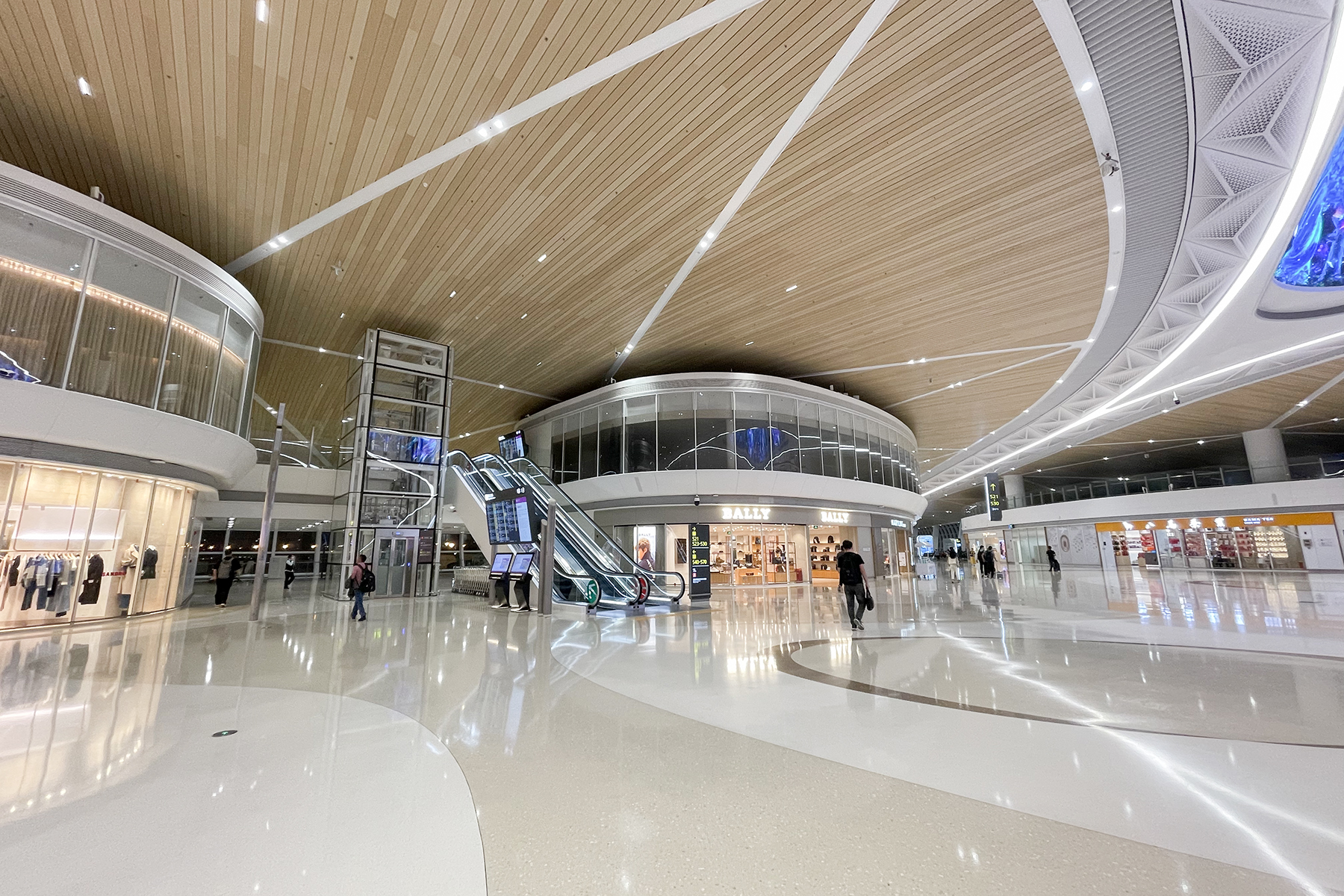
Departure hall

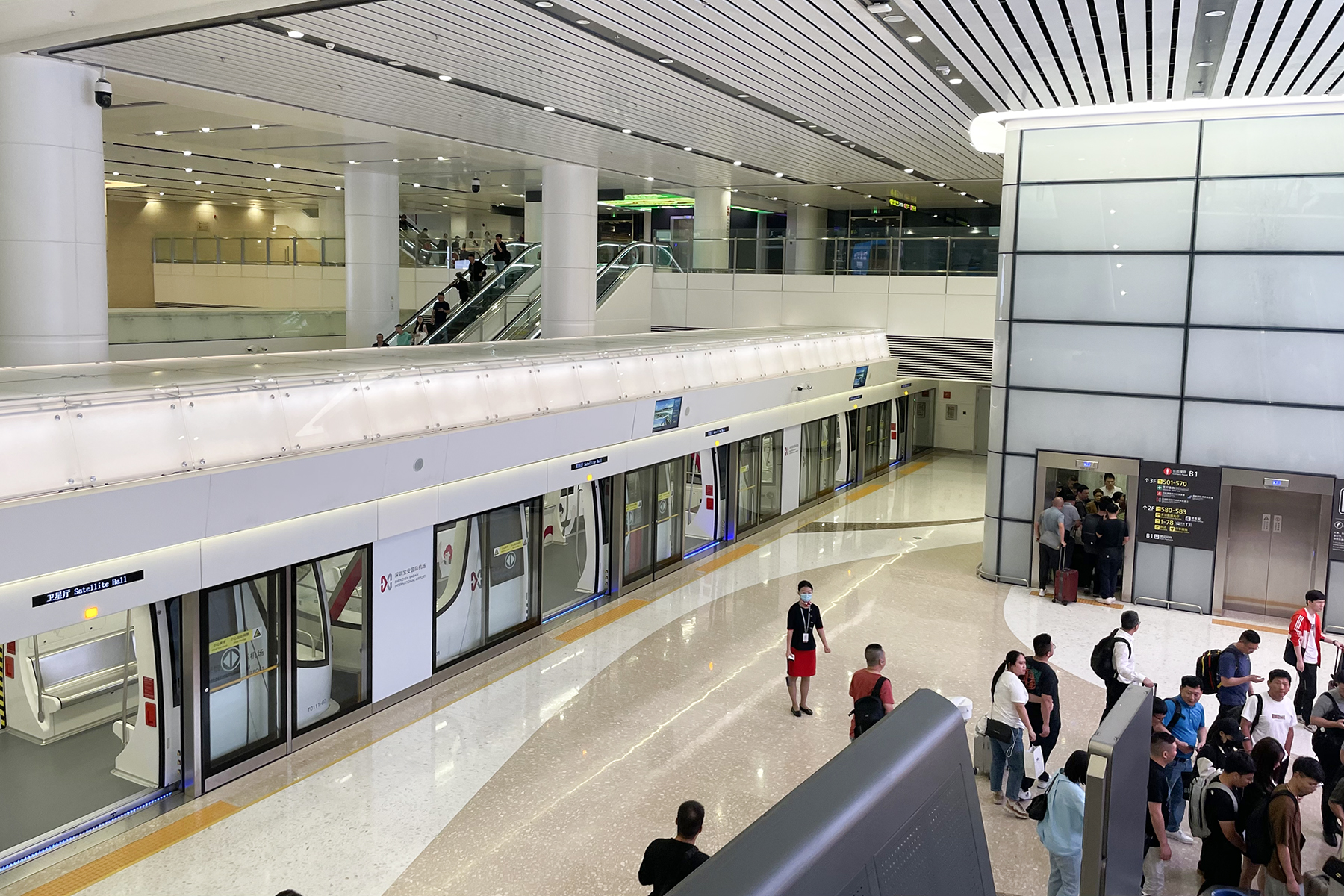
Automated people mover station

== Passenger transport facilities ==
The passenger transport facilities are divided into three parts: a main terminal building and two large corridors—1,050 meters (3,440 ft) long and 650 meters (2,130 ft) wide—that form a cross shape. The current terminal is three times the size of former Terminals A and B, with 450,000 square meters (4,800,000 sq ft) of floor space, 62 boarding gates and the ability to accommodate any type of plane in the world. The main building has four floors above ground and two floors underground. A connecting Ground Transport Center adjoins the terminal to the south. The main building's third floor is the waiting area for domestic and international flights, which depart from the east wing.

== Airlines and destinations ==
=== Passenger ===
| Airlines | Destinations |
|---|---|
| Air Cambodia | Phnom Penh, Siem Reap, Sihanoukville |
| Air China | Beijing–Capital, Chengdu–Shuangliu, Chengdu–Tianfu, Chongqing, Dazhou, Frankfurt, Guiyang, Hangzhou, Johannesburg–O.R. Tambo, Los Angeles, Shanghai–Pudong, Tianjin, Wuhan |
| Air Travel | Baoshan, Nanjing |
| AirAsia | Kota Kinabalu, Kuala Lumpur–International, Penang |
| All Nippon Airways | Tokyo–Haneda |
| Asiana Airlines | Seoul–Incheon |
| Beijing Capital Airlines | Lijiang |
| Cambodia Airways | Phnom Penh |
| Chengdu Airlines | Chengdu–Shuangliu |
| China Airlines | Kaohsiung, Taipei–Taoyuan |
| China Eastern Airlines | Bangkok–Suvarnabhumi, Beijing–Daxing, Chengdu–Tianfu, Chongqing, Hangzhou, Jinzhou, Kunming, Lanzhou, Nanjing, Ningbo, Qingdao, Shanghai–Hongqiao, Shanghai–Pudong, Taiyuan, Wuhan, Wuxi, Xi'an |
| China Southern Airlines | Ankang, Anyang, Bangkok–Suvarnabhumi, Beijing–Daxing, Bijie, Changchun, Changde, Changsha, Changzhou, Chengdu–Shuangliu, Chengdu–Tianfu, Chiang Mai, Chongqing, Dali, Dalian, Dandong, Dubai–International, Fuyang, Guangyuan, Guiyang, Haikou, Hangzhou, Hanoi, Harbin, Hefei, Heze, Ho Chi Minh City, Hohhot, Huai'an, Jakarta–Soekarno-Hatta, Jiamusi, Jinan, Jining, Kashgar, Kuala Lumpur–International, Kunming, Lanzhou, Lijiang, Liuzhou, Luoyang, Luzhou, Mexico City–Benito Juárez, Mianyang, Moscow–Sheremetyevo, Mudanjiang, Nanchong, Nanjing, Nanyang, Ningbo, Nyingchi, Ordos, Qingdao, Qinhuangdao, Qiqihar, Riyadh, Sanya, Seoul–Incheon, Shanghai–Hongqiao, Shanghai–Pudong, Shenyang, Singapore, Surabaya, Sydney–Kingsford Smith, Taipei–Taoyuan, Taiyuan, Tianjin, Tokyo–Narita, Urumqi, Wenzhou, Wuhan, Xi'an, Xishuangbanna, Yan'an, Yancheng, Yangon, Yinchuan, Yiwu, Zhangjiajie, Zhengzhou, Zunyi–Maotai; Seasonal: Yanji |
| China United Airlines | Beijing–Daxing, Wenzhou |
| Chongqing Airlines | Chongqing, Hechi, Taizhou, Wushan |
| Colorful Guizhou Airlines | Chengdu–Tianfu, Xingyi |
| Donghai Airlines | Beijing–Daxing, Bengbu, Changchun, Changzhi, Chengdu–Tianfu, Chongqing, Dalian, Datong, Haikou, Hangzhou, Jinan, Jingzhou, Kunming, Lanzhou, Lianyungang, Lishui, Nanjing, Nantong, Qingdao, Qingyang, Shanghai–Pudong, Shangrao, Shiyan, Taiyuan, Vientane, Wanzhou, Wuxi, Xi'an, Xishuangbanna, Yichang, Yiwu, Zhengzhou, Zhongwei, Zhoushan, Zunyi–Xinzhou; Charter: Medan |
| Emirates | Dubai–International |
| Etihad Airways | Abu Dhabi (begins 7 March 2027) |
| Hainan Airlines | Auckland, Beijing–Capital, Brussels, Budapest, Cairo, Changchun, Chengdu–Shuangliu, Chongqing, Dalian, Guiyang, Haikou, Hangzhou, Hanzhong, Harbin, Hohhot, Kashgar, Kunming, Lanzhou, Madrid, Milan–Malpensa, Nanjing, Ningbo, Paris–Charles de Gaulle, Qingdao, Rizhao, Rome–Fiumicino, Sanya, Shanghai–Hongqiao, Shanghai–Pudong, Taiyuan, Tel Aviv, Tianjin, Urumqi, Vancouver, Vienna, Wenzhou, Xiamen, Xi'an, Xuzhou, Yulin (Shaanxi), Zhengzhou |
| Hebei Airlines | Shijiazhuang |
| Hunnu Air | Ulaanbaatar |
| Jiangxi Air | Zhengzhou |
| Juneyao Air | Lijiang, Shanghai–Hongqiao, Shanghai–Pudong |
| Korean Air | Seoul–Incheon |
| Kunming Airlines | Kunming |
| LJ Air | Harbin, Hohhot, Linfen, Ordos |
| Loong Air | Changchun, Chengdu–Tianfu, Enshi, Hangzhou, Harbin, Heze, Jiaxing, Xining, Xuzhou |
| Lucky Air | Kunming |
| Mahan Air | Tehran–Imam Khomeini |
| Malaysia Airlines | Kuala Lumpur–International |
| Maldivian | Seasonal: Bangkok–Suvarnabhumi, Malé |
| Okay Airways | Changchun, Ezhou, Jiujiang, Shijiazhuang, Tianjin, Xi'an, Xinyang, Yangzhou |
| Parata Air | Seoul–Incheon |
| Ruili Airlines | Wuxi |
| Shandong Airlines | Jinan, Qingdao, Shenyang, Weihai, Wuyishan, Yantai |
| Shanghai Airlines | Shanghai–Hongqiao |
| Shenzhen Airlines | Bangkok–Suvarnabhumi, Bandar Seri Begawan, Barcelona, Bazhong, Beijing–Capital, Changchun, Changzhou, Chengdu–Shuangliu, Chengdu–Tianfu, Chizhou, Chongqing, Dalian, Doha, Haikou, Hai Phong, Hangzhou, Hanoi, Harbin, Hefei, Ho Chi Minh City, Hohhot, Jakarta–Soekarno-Hatta, Jeju, Jiaxing, Jinan, Jingdezhen, Kuala Lumpur–International, Kunming, Lanzhou, Lijiang, Linyi, London–Heathrow, Lishui, Manila, Melbourne, Mianyang, Nanchang, Nanjing, Nanning, Nantong, Ningbo, Osaka–Kansai, Penang, Phnom Penh, Phuket, Qingdao, Sanya, Seoul–Incheon, Shanghai–Hongqiao, Shanghai–Pudong, Shaoyang, Shenyang, Shijiazhuang, Singapore, Sydney–Kingsford Smith (begins 14 December 2026), Taipei–Taoyuan, Taiyuan, Taizhou, Tianjin, Tokyo–Narita, Urumqi, Wenzhou, Wuhan, Wuhu, Wuxi, Xi'an, Xiangyang, Xining, Yangzhou, Yantai, Yibin, Yichang, Yichun (Jiangxi), Yinchuan, Yuncheng, Zhanjiang, Zhengzhou; Charter: Bandar Seri Begawan |
| Sichuan Airlines | Chengdu–Shuangliu, Chongqing, Kunming, Nyingchi, Xi'an, Xichang |
| Singapore Airlines | Singapore |
| Sky Shuttle | Macau–Terminal Marítimo |
| Spring Airlines | Changchun, Chongqing, Dalian, Dongying, Harbin, Huai'an, Jakarta–Soekarno-Hatta, Jinan, Lanzhou, Nanjing, Nanyang, Ningbo, Phnom Penh, Shanghai–Hongqiao, Shijiazhuang, Tongliao, Wuhai, Wuhan, Xi'an |
| Suparna Airlines | Guiyang, Hailar, Hangzhou, Hohhot, Jinan, Langzhong, Longnan, Nanjing, Shanghai–Pudong, Turpan, Yulin (Guangxi), Zhengzhou |
| Thai AirAsia | Bangkok–Don Mueang |
| Thai Lion Air | Bangkok–Don Mueang |
| Tianjin Airlines | Anqing, Tianjin |
| Tibet Airlines | Chengdu–Shuangliu, Lhasa, Lijiang, Mianyang, Xi'an |
| TransNusa | Charter: Manado |
| Uni Air | Taipei–Taoyuan |
| West Air | Chongqing, Hefei, Jinan, Zhengzhou |
| XiamenAir | Beijing–Daxing, Changchun, Chongqing, Hangzhou, Harbin, Luzhou, Quzhou, Shanghai–Hongqiao, Shenyang, Tianjin |

=== Cargo ===
| Airlines | Destinations |
|---|---|
| AeroLogic | Leipzig/Halle |
| ASL Airlines Belgium | Liège |
| Cardig Air | Hanoi |
| Cargolux | Bangkok–Suvarnabhumi, Budapest, Luxembourg |
| Central Airlines | Beijing–Daxing, Cebu, Davao, Hefei, Jakarta–Soekarno-Hatta, Manila, Paris–Charles de Gaulle, Riyadh, Weifang, Wenzhou, Wuxi |
| China Airlines Cargo | Taipei–Taoyuan |
| China Cargo Airlines | Jakarta–Soekarno-Hatta, Shanghai–Pudong |
| China Postal Airlines | Osaka–Kansai |
| China Southern Cargo | Beijing–Capital |
| Donghai Airlines | Chengdu–Shuangliu, Hong Kong, Manila, Shanghai–Pudong |
| Ethiopian Airlines Cargo | Addis Ababa, Liège |
| EVA Air Cargo | Taipei–Taoyuan |
| FedEx Express | Anchorage, Manila |
| Jingdong Airlines | Beijing–Daxing, Clark,Kuala Lumpur-International, Singapore |
| K-Mile Air | Bangkok, Kuala Lumpur |
| Longhao Airlines | Bangkok–Suvarnabhumi, Ho Chi Minh City, Kuala Lumpur–International, Manila, Osaka–Kansai, Singapore, Weifang, Wuxi |
| My Indo Airlines | Balikpapan, Singapore |
| SF Airlines | Bangkok–Suvarnabhumi, Beijing–Capital, Bengaluru, Chengdu–Shuangliu, Chennai, Delhi, Ezhou, Hangzhou, Ho Chi Minh City, Hong Kong, Kota Kinabalu, Kuala Lumpur–International, Los Angeles, Manila, Nantong, Osaka–Kansai, Phnom Penh, Shanghai–Pudong, Singapore, Taipei–Taoyuan, Wenzhou, Wuhan, Wuxi, Zhengzhou |
| Suparna Airlines Cargo | Dhaka, Hangzhou, Hong Kong, Shanghai–Pudong |
| Turkmenistan Airlines Cargo | Ashgabat |
| UPS Airlines | Anchorage, Bangkok–Suvarnabhumi, Clark, Cologne/Bonn, Dubai–International, Ho Chi Minh City, Kuala Lumpur–International, Mumbai, Osaka–Kansai, Seoul–Incheon, Singapore |

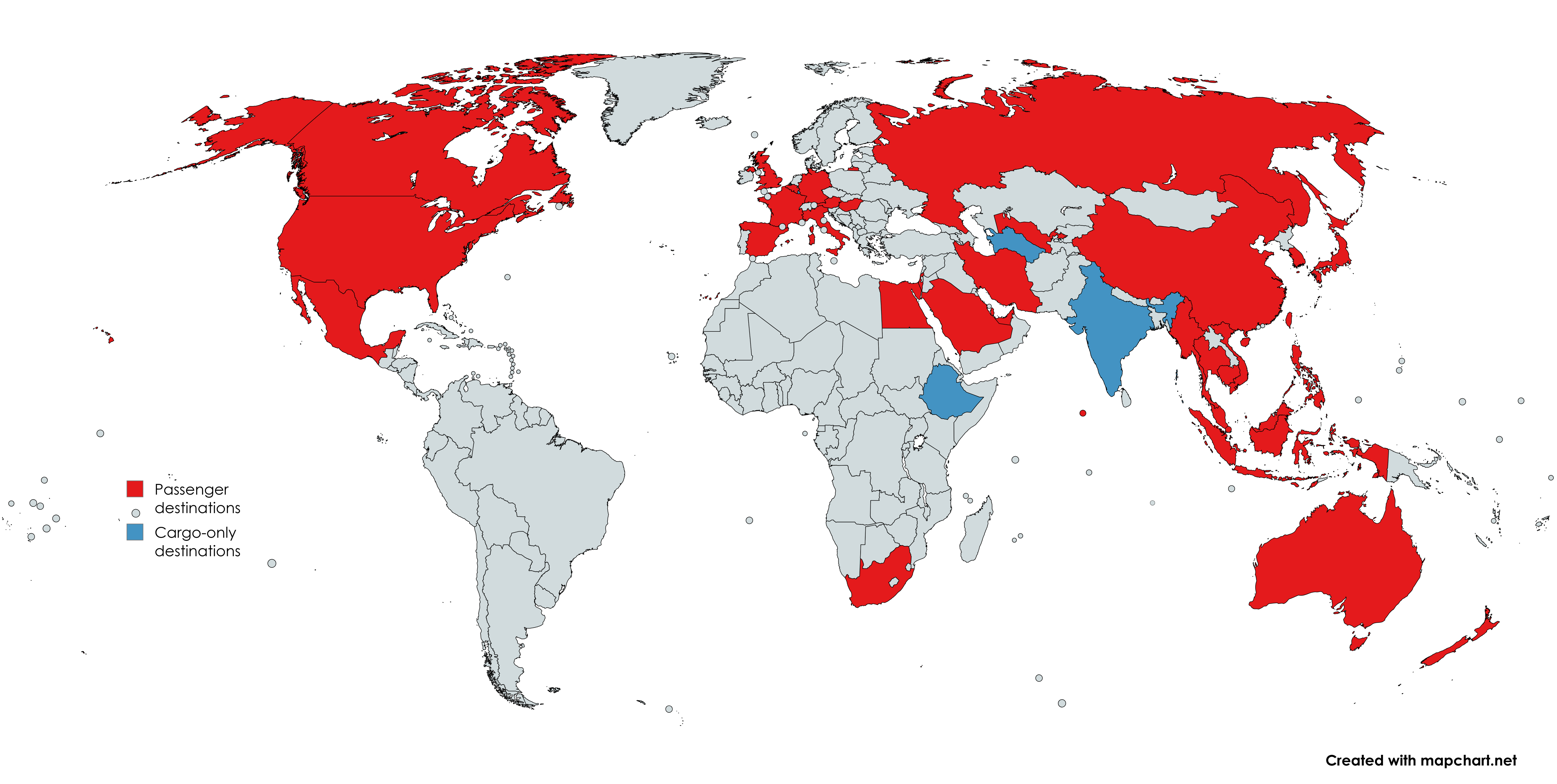
Red shows passenger destinations, blue shows cargo-only destinations

== Ground transportation ==
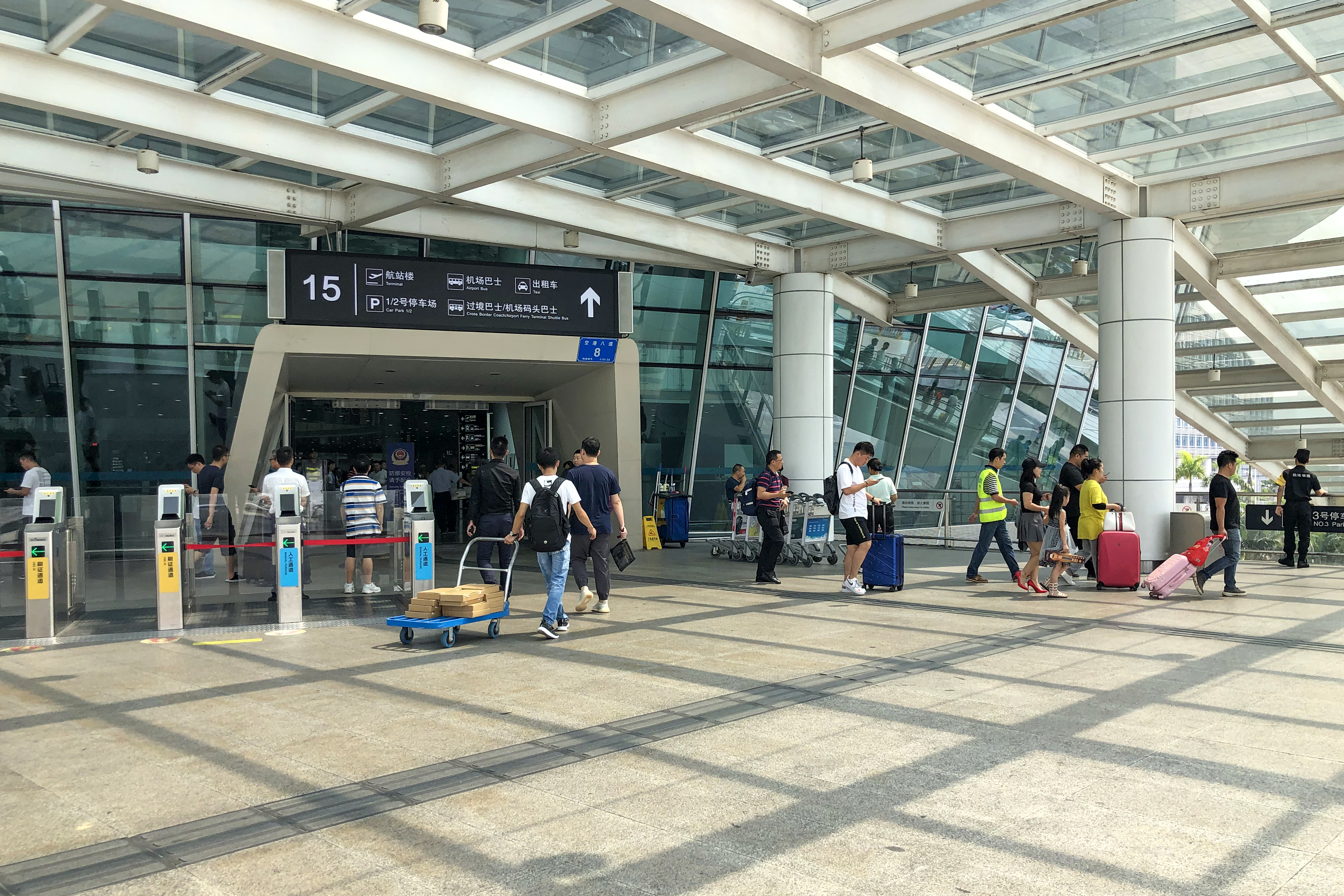
Ground Transportation Center entrance

=== Ground Transportation Center ===
The baggage areas are a short walks away from the Ground Transportation Center (GTC), where passengers can take buses, taxis and Shenzhen Metro trains. The transportation center offers local and long-distance bus services on the first floor, with taxi and Airport Express Shuttle 330 bus services on the second floor. The underground floor connects with Airport Station on Metro Line 11. Bus M416 also provides a shuttle service to Hourui Station on Line 1. In the future, it will also connect to the Guangzhou-Dongguan-Shenzhen Intercity Railway, which is under construction.

Regular bus and minibus services links the airport with the rest of the city. Intercity bus services to some other nearby cities such as Zhongshan, Hong Kong and Dongguan are also available.

Local taxis, and often some taxis from Dongguan, can pick up passengers there from three designated waiting areas. These areas have the capacity to handle 21 taxi cabs picking up passengers simultaneously.

=== Metro / rail ===
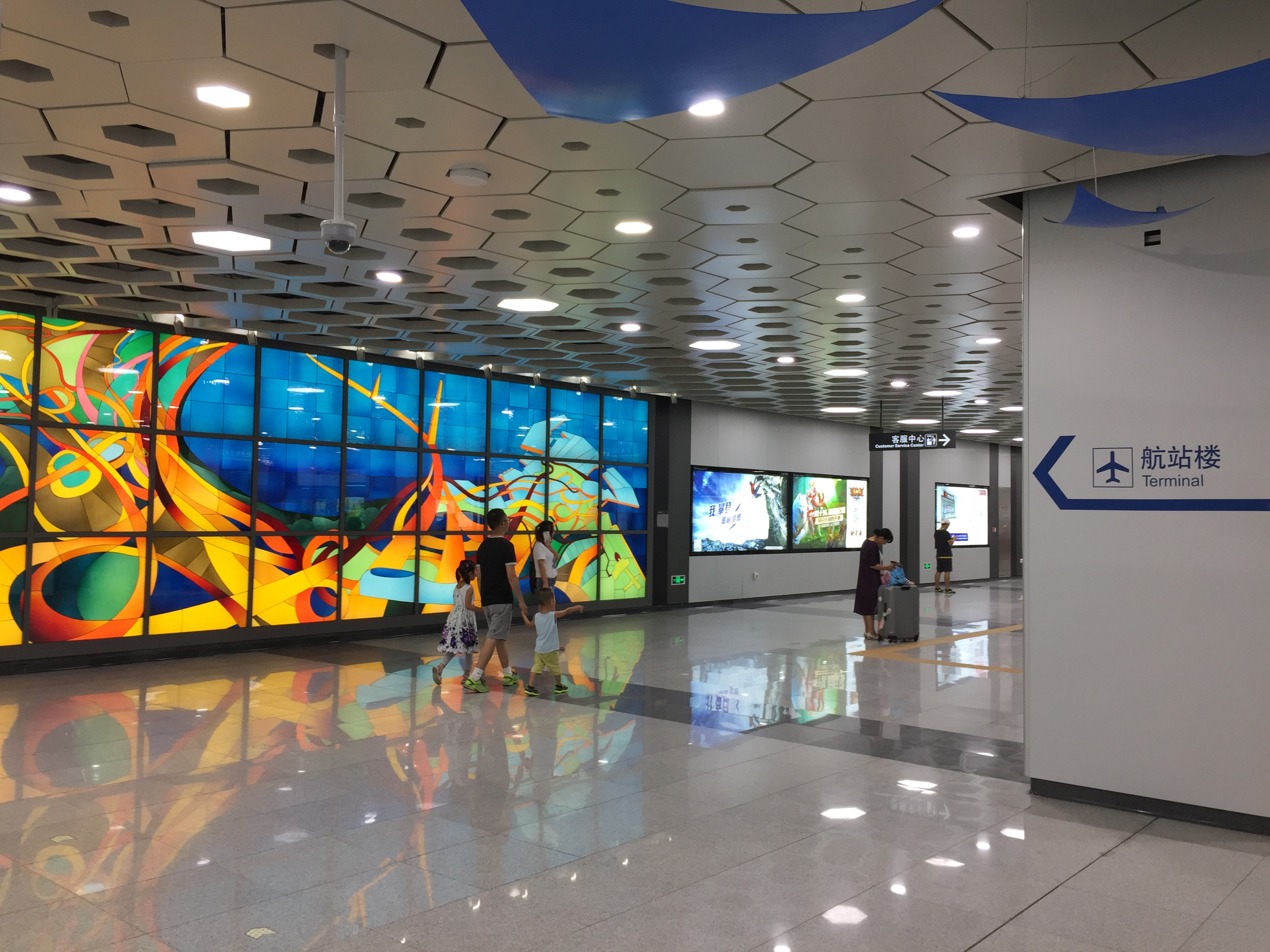
Airport station

Airport station on Line 11 has direct link to the Ground Transport Center of the current terminal, with eastbound service from the airport via Bao'an and Nanshan to Futian station, connecting with Futian railway station High Speed Rail services, and westbound service via Fuyong, Shajing and Songgang to Bitou.

There are also shuttle services connecting with Line 1 of the Shenzhen Metro. Non-stopping service M416 runs between Hourui Station and the new terminal.

Airport North Station on Line 11 is also built, under the site of future new Terminal project - "Terminal 4". However, Airport North Station is inaccessible to or from any of the airport facilities. Line 20 (Shenzhen International Exhibition Center Conveyance Project) links Airport North Station on Line 11 with services to Chongqing Road, International Exhibition Center South, International Exhibition Center North and International Conference Center stations. Line 20 opened in December 2021.

Guangzhou–Shenzhen intercity railway currently serves Shenzhen Airport Station and Shenzhen Airport North Station. In the future, Shenzhen–Maoming High-Speed Railway and Hong Kong–Shenzhen Western Express Railway are planned to stop here.

=== Ferry ===
Fast ferries are available to Outer Harbour Ferry Terminal and Taipa Ferry Terminal in Macau plus to the Skypier Ferry Terminal at Hong Kong International Airport via the nearby Fuyong Pier. Free shuttle buses connect the pier and the airport.

Direct services to Hong Kong Island and Kowloon were suspended because the Terminals A & B's long distance from the ferry terminal made it unpopular for commuters. However, with the opening of Terminal C, direct services may be resumed because it is much closer.

=== Airport express shuttle bus ===
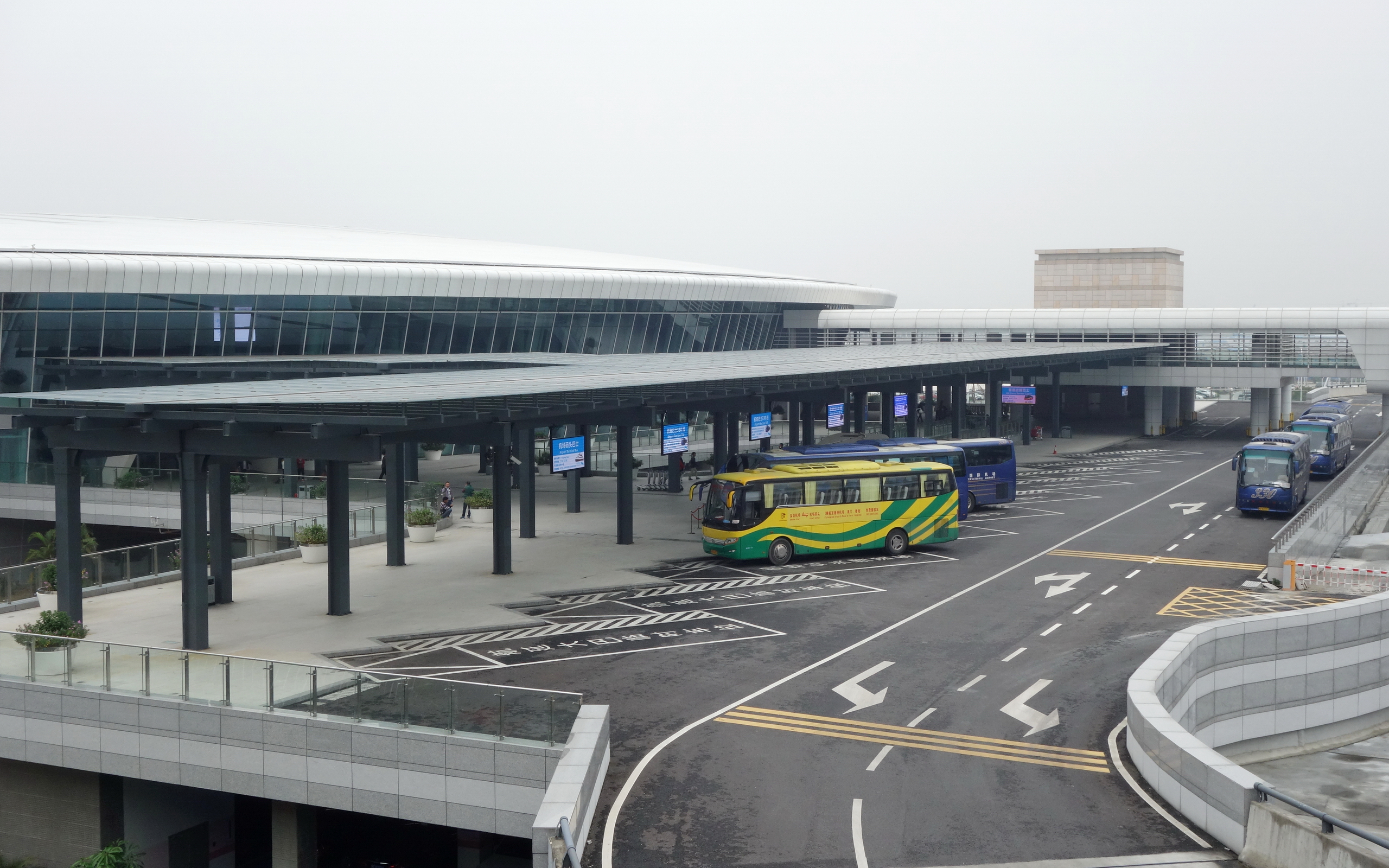
Airport express shuttle bus station

There are many bus routes between the airport and the urban area, most of them via expressways. A future service connecting the airport with Shenzhen North station is expected to start when the new Terminal 3 opens as part of five new major airport express shuttle buses.

=== Cross-border buses ===
Buses currently run mostly via Shenzhen Bay Control Point to many destinations across Hong Kong, Kowloon and the New Territories. Coach service is provided by Trans Island Limousine Service Ltd serving SZIA and Hong Kong, including Sheung Wan, Causeway Bay, Mong Kok (Prince Edward), Tsim Sha Tsui and Hong Kong International Airport.

A direct coach service, operated by Chinalink Bus Company, is available at Elements Mall in Hong Kong. Passengers may check-in for their flights at the bus terminal but luggage must still be carried to the airport by the passengers. The service operates from Kowloon station on the Airport Express (MTR) line direct to the Shenzhen International airport.

=== Shenzhen–Zhongshan Bridge ===
The completed Shenzhen–Zhongshan Bridge will directly connect Shenzhen Baoan International Airport on the eastern side of the Pearl River Delta with the city of Zhongshan on the western side. It will consist of a series of bridges and tunnels and will cut travel time from Shenzhen to Zhongshan to less than 30 minutes. Construction of the proposed 51 km (32 mi) eight-lane link started in 2017, with completion scheduled for 2024.

== Other facilities ==
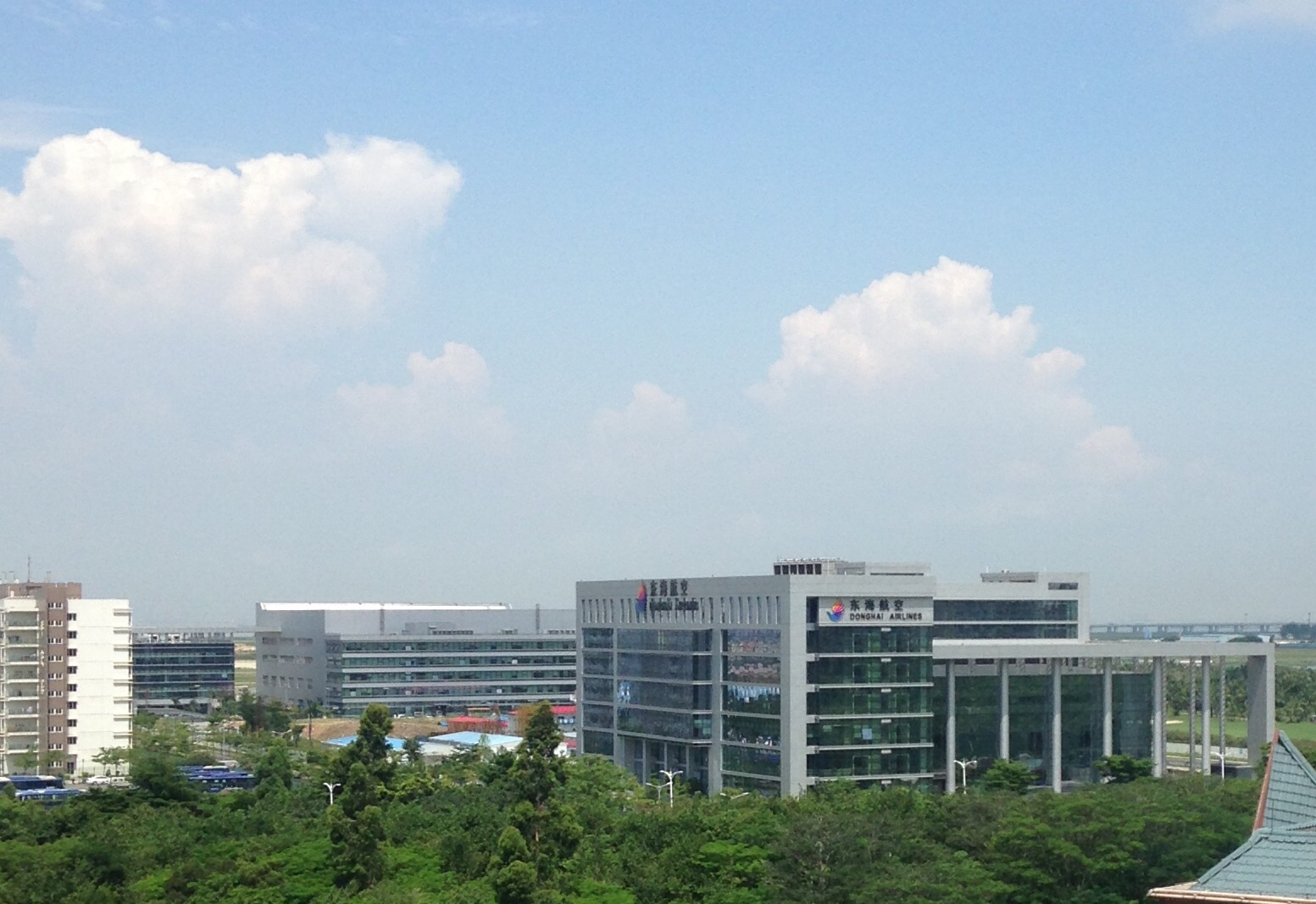
Donghai Airlines headquarters

Shenzhen Airlines is headquartered on the grounds of the airport. Jade Cargo International was headquartered on the sixth floor of the Shenzhen Airlines Flight Operations Building on grounds of Shenzhen Baoan International Airport. Shenzhen Donghai Airlines has its head office in the Shenzhen Airlines facility on the airport property.

SF Airlines has its headquarters in the No.1 Freight Depot of the International Shipping Center.

== Accidents and incidents ==
- China Southern Airlines Flight 3456 - crashed while landing on 8 May 1997

== See also ==
- List of airports in China
- List of airports in Guangdong province, from 1911-current (Zh-Wiki)
