= Lishui Airport =

Airport in Lishui, Zhejiang, China

Lishui Airport 丽水机场
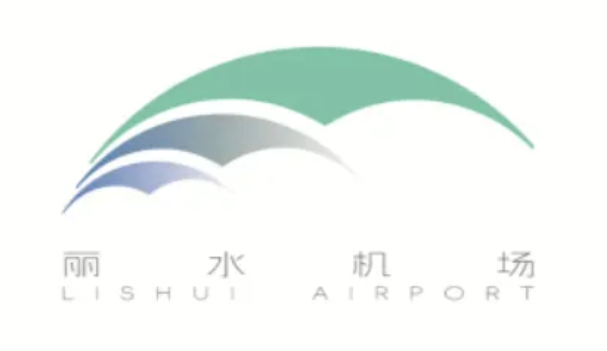
- IATA: LIJ; ICAO: ZSLI

Summary
- Airport type: Public / Military
- Operator: Zhejiang Airport Group
- Serves: Lishui, Zhejiang, China
- Opened: 18 July 2025; 15 months ago
- Coordinates: 28°22′15″N 119°50′05″E

Map
- Location of airport in Zhejiang

Runways
Direction	Length		Surface
Direction	m	ft	Surface
06/24	2,800	9,186

Lishui Airport
- Simplified Chinese: 丽水机场
- Traditional Chinese: 麗水機場
Transcriptions
Standard Mandarin
- Hanyu Pinyin: Líshuǐ Jīchǎng

Lishui Airport (IATA: LIJ, ICAO: ZSLI) is a civil and military dual-use airport serving the city of Lishui in Zhejiang Province, China. The airport project began in 2009, and it received approval from the national government and the Central Military Commission in December 2016.

The construction budget for the airport is CN¥2.64 billion, of which 40% is provided by CAAC, 20% from the National Development and Reform Commission, and 20% from Zhejiang Provincial Government. On October 24, 2024, the runway at Lishui Airport was completed. The airport opened on July 18, 2025.

== Name and logo ==
The name and logo (pictured) of Lishui Airport were selected in a naming competition. The name "Lishui Airport," with no secondary proper name, was selected over other names such as Lishui Chuzhou Airport, Lishui Liancheng Airport, and Lishui Nanshan Airport. The logo was designed by Liu Ketong and selected out of a total of 385 proposals.

== Facilities ==
Lishui Airport will have a 2,800-metre (9,200 ft) and 45-meter (147 ft) wide runway (class 4C), along with a 12,100-square-metre (130,000 sq ft) terminal building. It will also have eight Class C aircraft parking stands, three of which will be bridge stands. It is projected to serve 1 million passengers and 4000 tons of cargo annually by 2025.

== Airlines and destinations ==
Airlines	Destinations
Air China	Beijing–Capital
China Eastern Airlines	Shanghai–Pudong
China Express Airlines	Changsha, Chengdu, Zhoushan
China Southern Airlines	Guangzhou, Jieyang
Colorful Guizhou Airlines	Guiyang, Wuhan, Yibin, Zhoushan
Donghai Airlines	Kunming, Qingdao, Shenzhen
Hainan Airlines	Chongqing
Shenzhen Airlines	Shenzhen
Tianjin Airlines	Xi'an

== See also ==
- List of airports in China
- List of the busiest airports in China
