= Dongji, Zhejiang =

Dongji 东极镇
- Town
- Location in Zhejiang
- Coordinates (Dongji government): 30°11′34″N 122°41′06″E
- Country: People's Republic of China
- Province: Zhejiang
- Prefecture-level city: Zhoushan
- District: Putuo

Area
  - Land: 11.7 km^{2} (4.5 sq mi)

Population
  - Total: 6,287
  - Density: 537/km^{2} (1,390/sq mi)
- Time zone: UTC+8 (China Standard)
- Postal code: 316100
- Area code: 0580
- Website: dongji.putuo.gov.cn (Simplified Chinese)

The town of Dongji (simplified Chinese: 东极; traditional Chinese: 東極; pinyin: Dōngjí; lit. 'east extremity') is an administrative division of Putuo District, Zhoushan, Zhejiang province, China. The town, as an administrative unit, occupies several minor islands of the Zhoushan Archipelago, namely:

- the islands of the Zhongjieshan Archipelago (中街山列岛), the three largest of which, west to east, are Huangxing (黄兴岛) Island, Miaozihu Island (庙子湖岛), and Qingbang Island (青浜岛).
- Dongfushan Island a few miles to the southeast of them.
- A few tiny islets farther east, at the easternmost extremity of the archipelago.

Most of the town's population resides on the larger islands of the Zhongjieshan Archipelago. The actual urban area, i.e. the "town" as marked on most maps, is in Miaozihu Island.

Lisbon Maru was sunk near these islands on October 1, 1942.
