= Putuo, Zhoushan =

Putuo 普陀区
- District
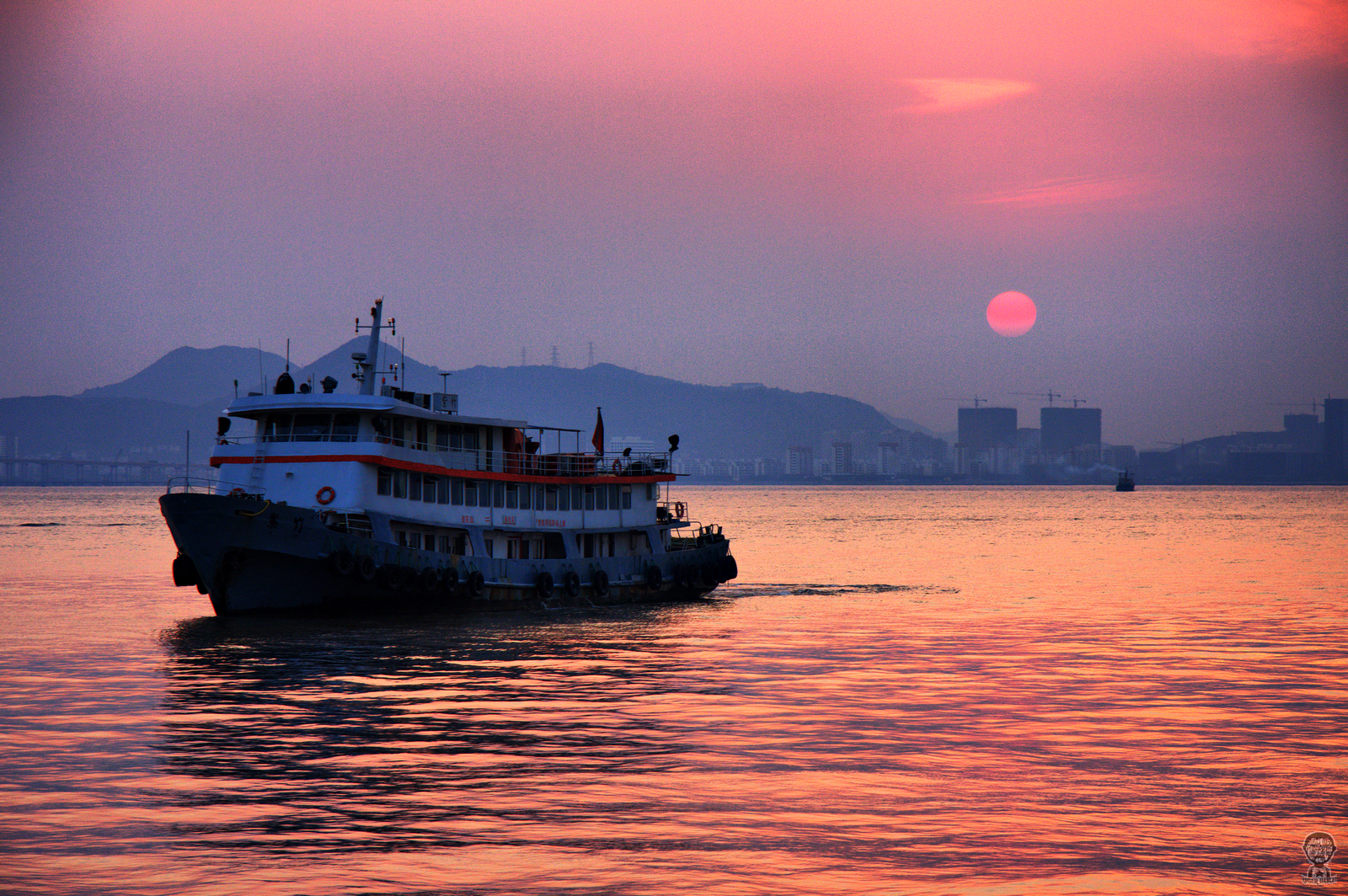

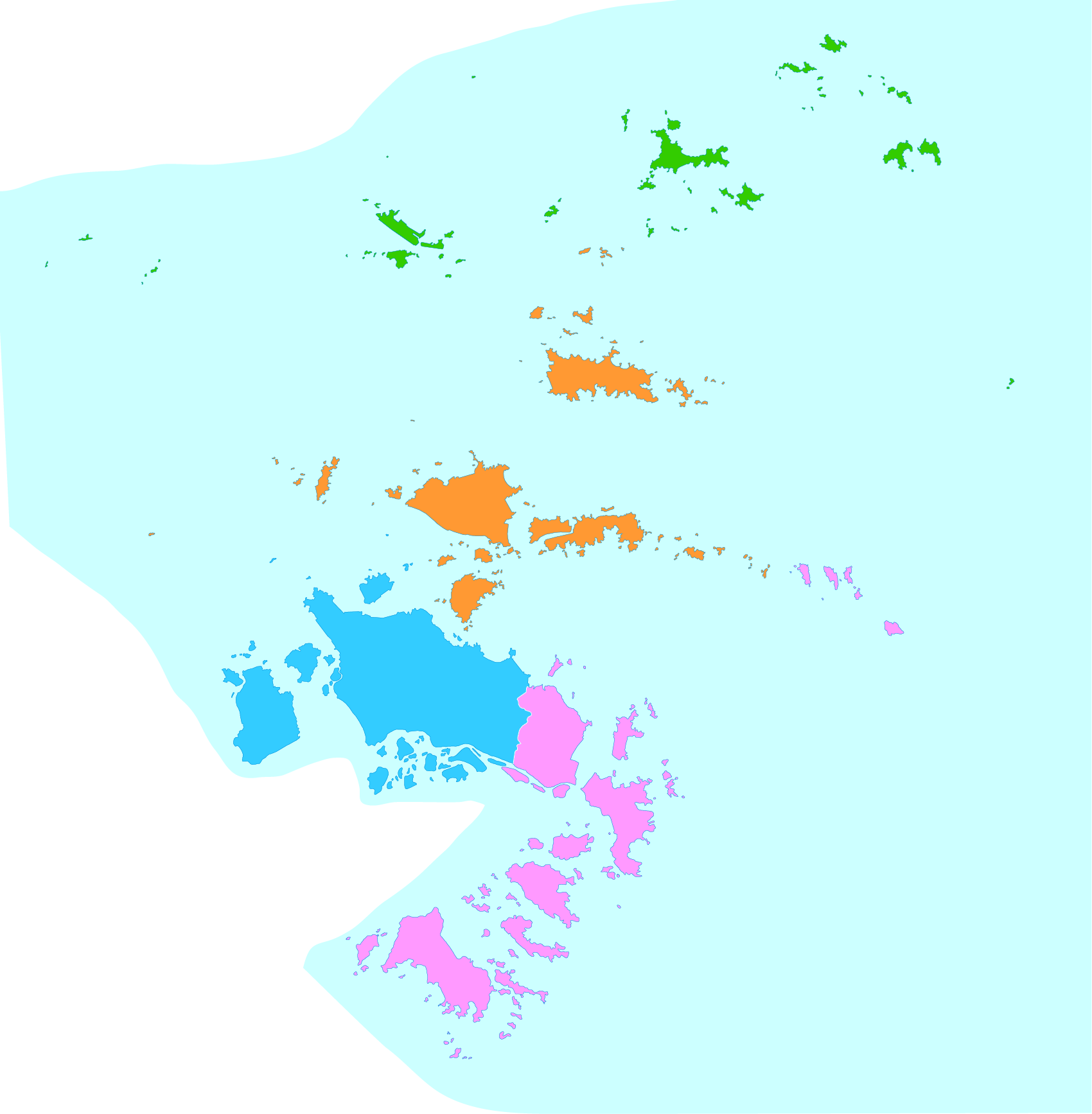
- Putuo District is in pink here on the map.

- Location in Zhejiang
- Coordinates: 29°54′N 122°23′E
- Country: People's Republic of China
- Province: Zhejiang
- Prefecture-level city: Zhoushan

Area
  - Total: 461.48 km^{2} (178.18 sq mi)
  - Land: 458.6 km^{2} (177.1 sq mi)

Population (2017)
  - Total: 1,284,700
  - Density: 2,801/km^{2} (7,255/sq mi)
- Time zone: UTC+8 (China Standard)
- Postal code: 200333

Putuo (the former county)
- Chinese: 普陀
- Postal: Puto
Transcriptions
Standard Mandarin
- Hanyu Pinyin: Pǔtuó
- Wade–Giles: P'u^{3}-t'o^{2}

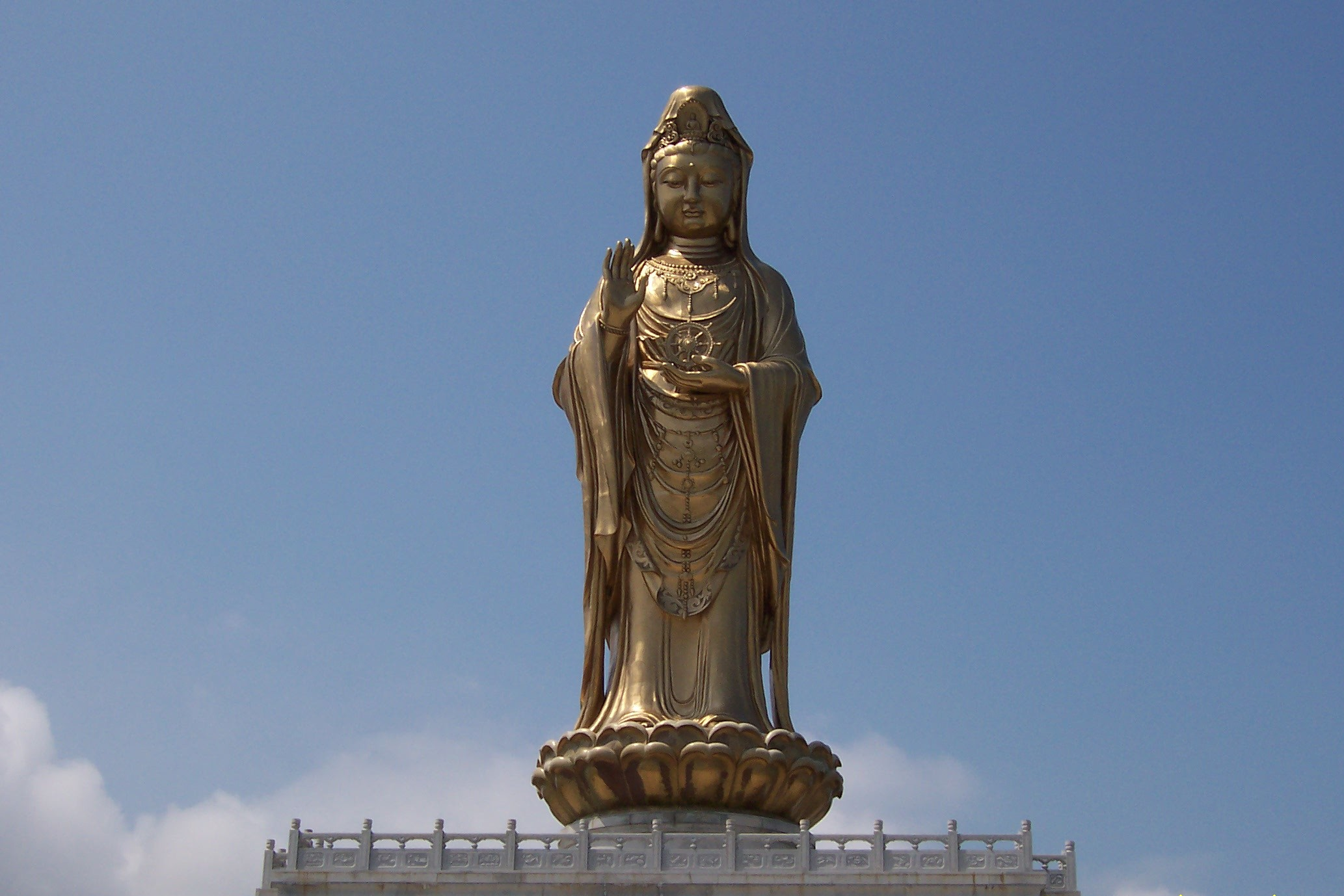
Statue of Guanyin, Mount Putuo

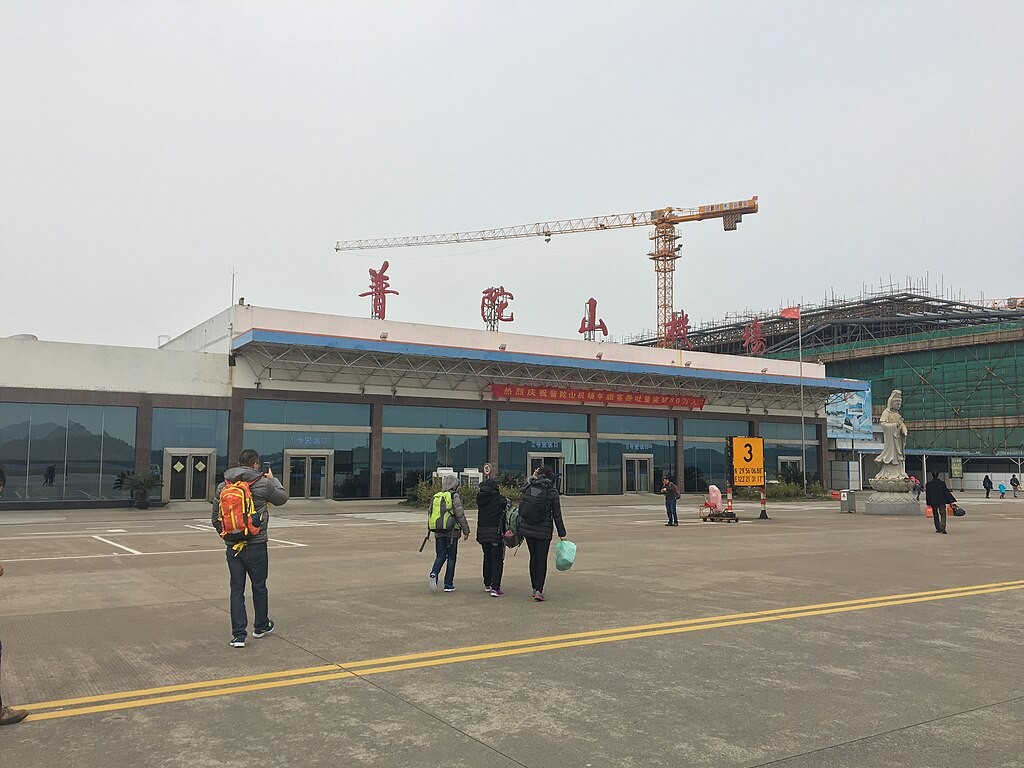
Zhoushan Putuoshan Airport

Putuo District is a district of Zhoushan City, Zhejiang, China with a population of 386,600. The district used to be a county. In 1987, it was combined with the neighbouring county of Dinghai to form the city of Zhoushan.

Tourism is the most important sector of Putuo's economy, which mostly depend on its Buddhist pilgrimage mountain Mount Putuo. There are three main types of transportation to and from Putuo: air, land and water.

== Basic Information ==
- District Seat: Shenjiamen Sub-District
- Population: 386,600 as of 2024
- Area: 6,730 km^{2} (2,600 sq mi) (459 km^{2} or 177 sq mi terrestrial, 6,271 km^{2} or 2,421 sq mi marine)
- Population Density: 825/km^{2} (2,140/sq mi)
- Gross Domestic Product: 488.16 billion yuan as of 2024
- Per capita GDP: 126,300 yuan (approximately 17,734.91 US Dollars)

== Economy ==
Putuo District's economy consists of diverse aspects.

In 2024, the agriculture, forestry, animal husbandry and fishery (primary industries) reached gross output of CNY 191.93 billion; the total retail sales of consumer goods reached CNY 224.89 billion; the total value of goods imported and exported reached CNY 589.89 billion.

Tourism is one of the important sectors of its economy, mostly depend on its mountain resources. In 2024, Mount Putuo reached CNY 10.11 billion tourism revenue, along with accommodation revenue of CNY 610 million, catering revenue of CNY 127 million, and wholesale and retail revenue of CNY 75 million.

Its ship and marine engineering industry achieved CNY 14.12 billion revenue in 2023. To 2019, there are four shipyards located in Putuo district, repaired total 707ships (607 foreign vessels) in 2018.

== Geography ==
Putuo District occupies the southeastern part of Zhoushan archipelago. It includes the eastern end of the archipelago Zhoushan Island, which is the largest island of the archipelago, and many dozens of smaller islands. Among them:

- the small, but famous Putuo Island (Putuo Shan, i.e. "Mount Putuo"). Putuo Island with nearby small islets is administratively organized as Putuo Town within Putuo District.
- Zhujiajian Island, connected to Zhoushan Island by a bridge, and administratively organized as Zhujiajian Town.
- Dengbu Island, organized as an eponymous township
- Mayi Island (literally, "Ant Island"), organized as an eponymous township
- Zhongjieshan Island Chain (中街山列岛), organized as Dongji.
- many others, with half a dozen towns and townships on them

== Administrative divisions ==
Subdistricts:

- Shenjiamen Subdistrict (沈家门街道), Goushan Subdistrict (勾山街道), Donggang Subdistrict (东港街道), Zhanmao Subdistrict (展茅街道), Zhujiajian Subdistrict (朱家尖街道)

Towns:

- Liuheng (六横镇), Taohua (桃花镇), Xiazhi (虾峙镇), Dongji (东极镇), Putuoshan (普陀山镇)

Townships:

- Baisha Township (白沙乡), Dengbu Township (登步乡), Mayidao Township (蚂蚁岛乡)

== Climate ==
Climate data for Putuo, elevation 85 m (279 ft), (1991–2020 normals, extremes 1981–present)
Month	Jan	Feb	Mar	Apr	May	Jun	Jul	Aug	Sep	Oct	Nov	Dec	Year
Record high °C (°F)	21.5 (70.7)	23.9 (75.0)	28.9 (84.0)	29.9 (85.8)	29.7 (85.5)	32.9 (91.2)	38.1 (100.6)	39.1 (102.4)	36.1 (97.0)	33.2 (91.8)	27.2 (81.0)	23.4 (74.1)	39.1 (102.4)
Mean daily maximum °C (°F)	9.6 (49.3)	10.6 (51.1)	13.6 (56.5)	18.4 (65.1)	22.8 (73.0)	26.0 (78.8)	30.3 (86.5)	31.0 (87.8)	27.6 (81.7)	23.3 (73.9)	18.4 (65.1)	12.5 (54.5)	20.3 (68.6)
Daily mean °C (°F)	6.5 (43.7)	7.3 (45.1)	10.1 (50.2)	14.5 (58.1)	19.2 (66.6)	22.8 (73.0)	26.7 (80.1)	27.3 (81.1)	24.5 (76.1)	20.1 (68.2)	15.2 (59.4)	9.3 (48.7)	17.0 (62.5)
Mean daily minimum °C (°F)	4.1 (39.4)	4.7 (40.5)	7.4 (45.3)	11.6 (52.9)	16.6 (61.9)	20.6 (69.1)	24.2 (75.6)	25.0 (77.0)	22.2 (72.0)	17.8 (64.0)	12.7 (54.9)	6.8 (44.2)	14.5 (58.1)
Record low °C (°F)	−5.7 (21.7)	−3.6 (25.5)	−1.5 (29.3)	3.3 (37.9)	8.3 (46.9)	12.5 (54.5)	18.3 (64.9)	19.0 (66.2)	15.5 (59.9)	6.8 (44.2)	1.1 (34.0)	−5.4 (22.3)	−5.7 (21.7)
Average precipitation mm (inches)	77.1 (3.04)	81.3 (3.20)	126.4 (4.98)	105.0 (4.13)	124.7 (4.91)	203.1 (8.00)	93.1 (3.67)	133.7 (5.26)	151.4 (5.96)	99.2 (3.91)	88.4 (3.48)	76.6 (3.02)	1,360 (53.56)
Average precipitation days (≥ 0.1 mm)	11.8	11.5	15.2	14.1	14.1	16.6	9.5	11.2	12.0	9.0	11.0	10.7	146.7
Average snowy days	1.9	1.7	0.5	0	0	0	0	0	0	0	0	0.7	4.8
Average relative humidity (%)	75	76	79	80	84	90	87	86	81	75	75	72	80
Mean monthly sunshine hours	113.1	113.1	133.8	157.5	162.4	121.4	236.6	234.3	179.2	176.4	125.5	129.9	1,883.2
Percentage possible sunshine	35	36	36	41	38	29	55	58	49	50	40	41	42
Source: China Meteorological Administration all-time extreme temperature All-time Oct extreme

== Transportation ==
Zhoushan Putuoshan Airport

Zhoushan Putuoshan Airport is located on Zhujiajian Island, Putuo District, Zhoushan, which became international airport in 2018. In 2024, the annual passenger traffic of the airport was over 250 million, and its waypoints reached 35 China's cities, which made it enter into the list of medium-sized international airports. According to data released from CAAC (Civil Aviation Administration of China) in September 2025, Zhoushan Putuoshan Airport ranked No.25 among all East China airports, featuring monthly passenger traffic of 183,876; In terms of cargo and mail throughput, Zhoushan Putuoshan Airport ranked No.29 among all East China ariports; And it ranked No.23 in terms of aircraft operations.

Land transportation

There are three major coach terminals in Zhoushan: Zhoushan (Dinghai) Passenger Transport Center, Shenjiamen Putuo Coach Station, and Banshengdong Coach Station. There are shuttle buses connect to near cities, such as Shanghai, Hangzhou, Ningbo.

- Shenjiamen Putuo Coach Station - Shanghai South Coach Station (ltinerary about 6 hours)
- Shenjiamen Putuo Coach Station - Hangzhou East Coach Station (Itinerary about 5 hours)
- Shenjiamen Putuo Coach Station - Ningbo Coach Station or Ningbo North Coach Station (Itinerary about 1.5 hours)

Water transportation

There are ferries running between Zhoushan Islands. The ferry terminals are located in Shenjiamen Banshengdong, Sanjiang and Shenjiamen Duntou.

== Sister cities ==
- Port St. Lucie, Florida, United States of America
- Gokseong County, Jeollanamdo, South Korea ( friendly exchanges since 2001)

== Religion ==
Buddhist pilgrimage mountain Mount Putuo is located in the Putuo district. As a part of Chinese Buddhism, Bodhisattva Guanyin has been the religious symbol of Mount Putuo for over 1000 years.

Mount Putuo first became a Buddhist pilgrimage center during the Song dynasty and the Yuan dynasty. However, along with the emerging of Confucian orthodoxy, holistic development of Buddhism declined during the early and middle periods of the Ming dynasty. In terms of the official statement of defending the island from coastal piracy, the religious establishments on the Mount Putuo were destroyed at that time, resulting in a blank period of religious activity for about 200 years. By the late period of the Ming dynasty, the Buddhism gained support from the Wanli emperor and other officials, Mount Putuo revived to be a pilgrimage site.

Then Mount Putuo gained more sponsor from the Kangxi emperor, and continued to develop during the Qianlong reign and the Yongzheng reign during the Qing dynasty. But when entering into the late period of the Qing dynasty, the impact the Opium Wars and the Taiping Rebellion had on transprotation caused pilgrimages to Mount Putuo to decline again. After 1870, Mount Putuo experienced a "late Qing revival", re-established itself as an active and wealthy pilgrimage site.

In the 21st century, Mount Putuo's religious development encountered with financial issues. During 2017-2018, Putuoshan Tourism Development, which is the operator of Mount Putuo, once sought listing assets around Mount Putuo, then withdrawn its IPO application because of massive social pressure. Local Buddhist activists criticized the IPO is a "marketing of faith", which is against its religion protection goal.
