= Zhujiajian Island =

Island in Zhejiang, China

Coordinates: 29.9°N 122.4°E

South Beach of Zhujiajian Island, Zhoushan

Zhujiajian Island (Chinese: 朱家尖) is the 5th largest island in Zhoushan Islands, Zhejiang Province, China and location of the Zhoushan Putuoshan International Airport. It is connected to Zhoushan by cross-sea bridge.

Attractions include Donsha, Nansha, and Wushitang beaches, Baishan Hill, and Zhuwu Road. "Ten-li Golden Sand" is a series of five connected beaches spanning approximately 6.3 km long and has hosted the Zhoushan International Sand Sculpture Festival since approximately 2000. The island is also a popular surfing destination.
