= Yangmei =

Yangmei may refer to:

== Fruit ==
- Myrica rubra, or yangmei (杨梅), a Chinese fruit

== Places ==
- Yangmei District (楊梅區), district of Taoyuan City, Taiwan
- Yangmei, Jiangxi (扬眉镇), town in Chongyi County
- Yangmei, Huazhou (杨梅镇), Guangdong
- Yangmei, Yangshan County (杨梅镇), Guangdong
- Yangmei Ancient Town (杨美), Nanning, Guangxi
- Yangmei, Rong County (杨梅镇), Guangxi
