= Jiangxi, Guangxi =

Jiangxi 江西镇
- Town
- Location in Guangxi
- Coordinates: 22°46′38″N 108°5′43″E
- Country: People's Republic of China
- Autonomous Region: Guangxi
- Prefecture-level city: Nanning
- District: Jiangnan District
- Time zone: UTC+8 (China Standard)

Jiangxi (Chinese: 江西) is a town of Jiangnan District, Nanning, Guangxi, China. As of 2020, it administers Jiangxi Residential Community and the following ten villages:

- Jinjiang Village (锦江村)
- Tongxin Village (同新村)
- Tonghua Village (同华村)
- Tongning Village (同宁村)
- Tongliang Village (同良村)
- Anping Village (安平村)
- Zhixin Village (智信村)
- Yangmei Village (扬美村)
- Nalang Village (那廊村)
- Tongjiang Village (同江村)
