= Nanning Wuxu International Airport =

Airport serving Wuxu, Guangxi, China

Nanning Wuxu International Airport 南宁吴圩国际机场 Nanzningz Vuzhih Gozci Gihcangz
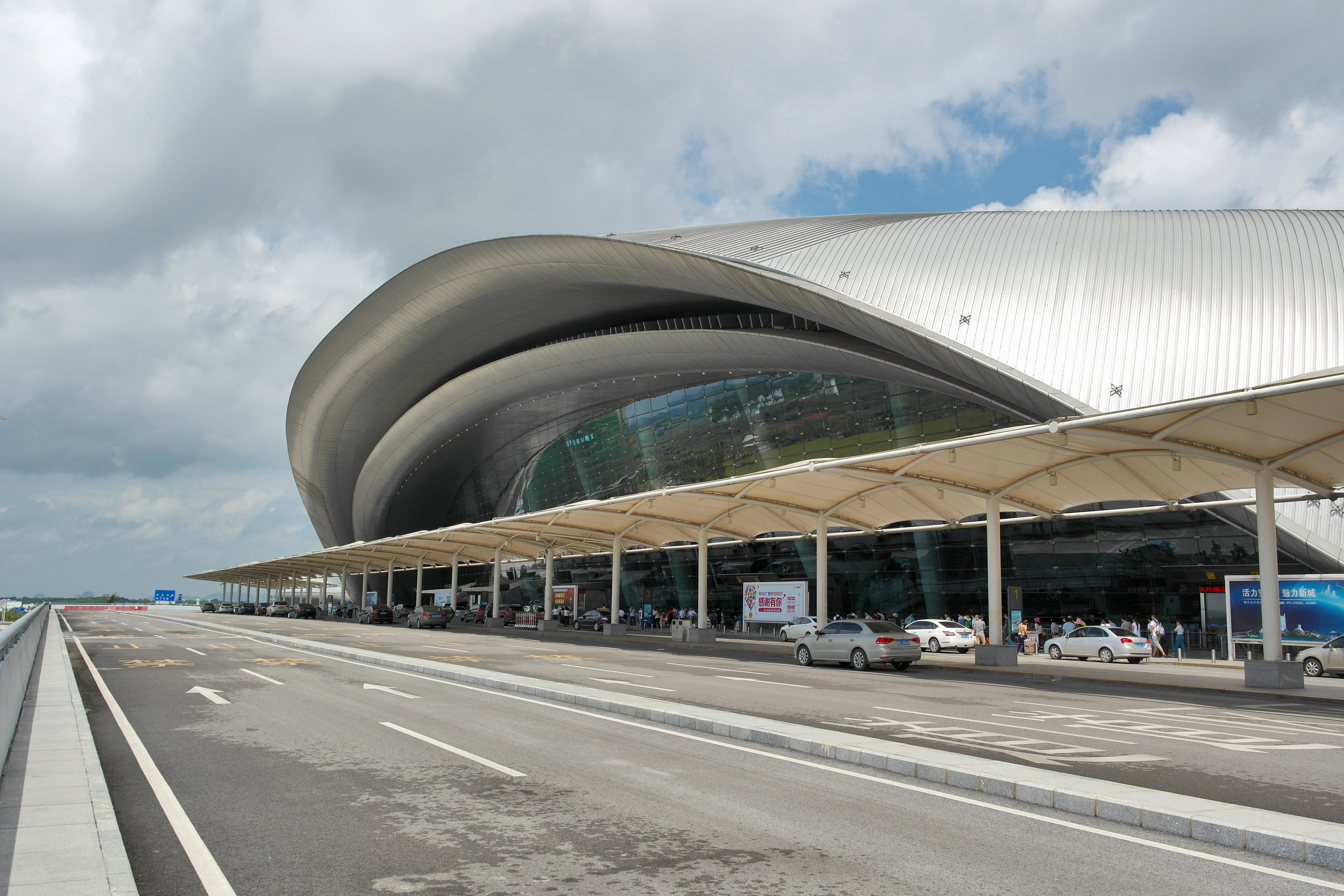
- Entrance to Nanning Wuxu International Airport Terminal 2, which opened in 2014
- IATA: NNG; ICAO: ZGNN

Summary
- Airport type: Public / military
- Serves: Nanning
- Location: Wuxu, Jiangnan, Nanning, Guangxi, China
- Opened: November 1962; 64 years ago
- Hub for: GX Airlines
- Elevation AMSL: 128 m (420 ft)
- Coordinates: 22°36′29.76″N 108°10′20.79″E

Maps
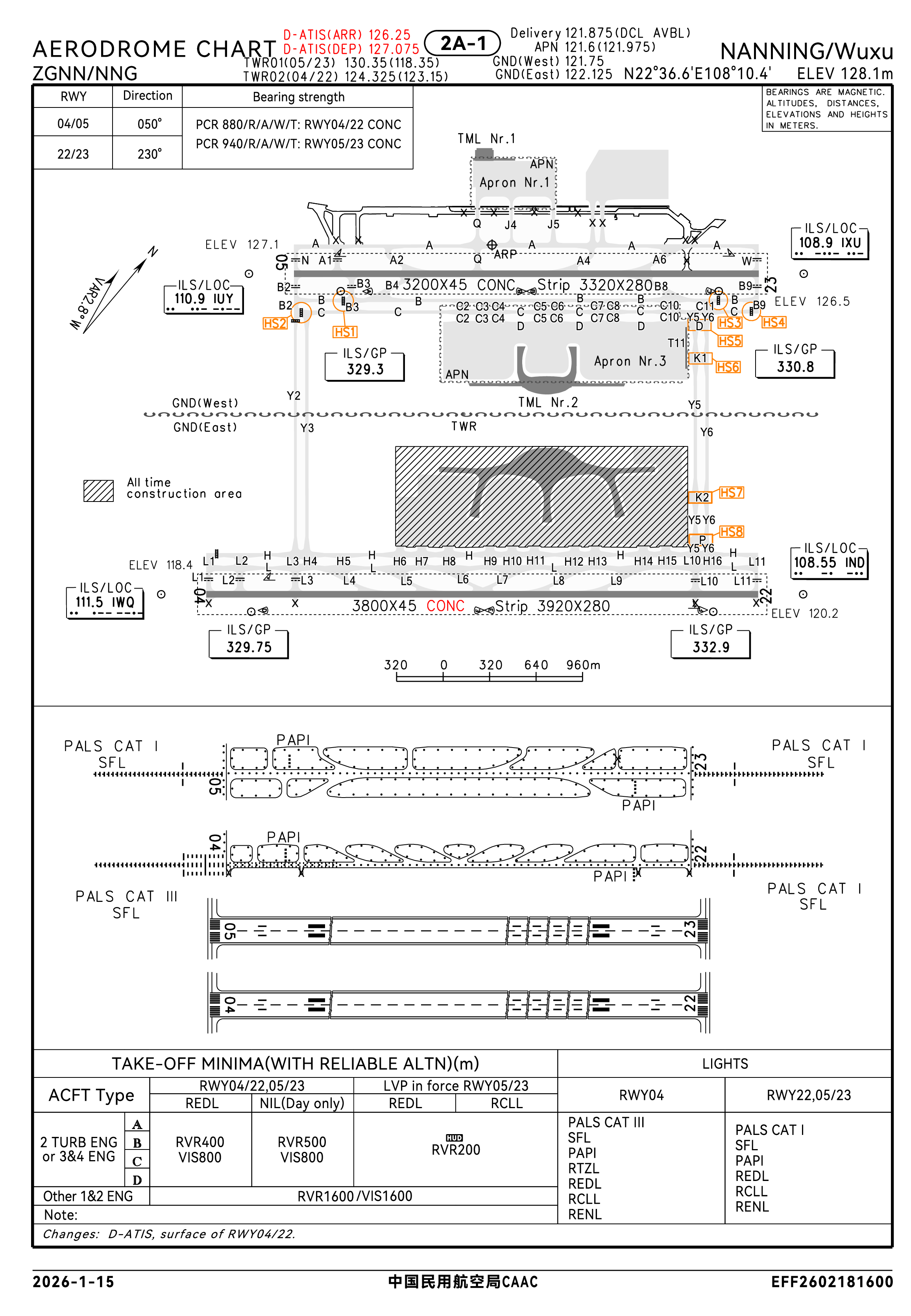
- CAAC airport chart

- Location in Guangxi Location in China

Runways
Direction	Length		Surface
Direction	m	ft	Surface
04/22	3,800	12,467	Concrete
05/23	3,200	10,499	Concrete

Statistics (2025)
- Passengers: 13,502,293
- Aircraft movements: 97,966
- Freight (in tonnes): 186,616.7
- Source: List of the busiest airports in China

Nanning Wuxu International Airport

Chinese name
- Traditional Chinese: 南寧吳圩國際機場
- Simplified Chinese: 南宁吴圩国际机场
Transcriptions
Standard Mandarin
- Hanyu Pinyin: Nánníng Wúxū Guójì Jīchǎng

Zhuang name
- Zhuang: Nanzningz Vuzhih Gozci Gihcangz

Nanning Wuxu International Airport (IATA: NNG, ICAO: ZGNN), known as Air Force Nanning Air Base when used for military purposes, is a joint‑use civil–military international airport serving Nanning, the capital of South Central China's Guangxi Zhuang Autonomous Region. It is located 32 km (20 mi) southwest of the centre of the city. The airport was built in 1962, with improvements made in 1990. Terminal 2 entered official operation on September 25, 2014. Its design was inspired by the Han‑dynasty "Phoenix Lantern" unearthed in Hepu, Guangxi. The building covers 189,000 m^{2} (2,030,000 sq ft), has three floors, and is equipped with 32 passenger boarding bridges.

It is designed to handle 16 million passengers annually. The number of passengers reached 1 million in 2002, and jumped to 2 million by 2006. The number of passengers reached 15 million passengers in 2019.

Classified as a 4E‑grade airfield, it is the largest airport in Guangxi and serves as an important provincial trunk‑line airport as well as a designated gateway hub to ASEAN. In 2025, the airport handled 13.5 million passengers, a year‑on‑year decrease of 3.6 percent; 186,616.7 tons of cargo and mail, down 8.1 percent; and 97,966 aircraft movements, an decrease of 7.5 percent. These figures ranked the airport 33th, 22nd, and 38th respectively among airports in China that year.

== History ==
The administrative predecessor of Nanning Wuxu International Airport was the authority that once managed Yongning Airfield (邕寧機場) and Nanning Airfield (南寧機場), which had been built in 1929 by the New Guangxi Clique (新桂系軍閥) for military purposes.

From 1942 to 1945, the Yongning Airfield served as a base for the U.S. Army Air Forces' Fourteenth Air Force — the successor to the Flying Tigers — and was primarily used by P‑38 reconnaissance aircraft conducting intelligence missions. After the end of the War of Resistance, the airfield was closed in October 1945.

In May 1945, after Nanning was restored, the Air Force of the National Revolutionary Army re‑entered the airfield and began repairing and expanding the facilities. They rebuilt structures and converted the original brick‑and‑stone runway into a taxiway, while constructing a new east–west runway with a gravel‑and‑earth surface measuring 1,545 meters in length, 45 meters in width, and 25 cm in thickness. Work came to a halt when Japan announced its unconditional surrender.^{:235}

On December 4, 1949, following the defeat of Nationalist forces in the Guangxi Campaign, the Republic of China Air Force abandoned Yongning Airport. Before departing, they strafed the fuel depot with machine‑gun fire, causing most of the buildings to burn down and leaving the airfield nearly in ruins.^{:288} That evening, units of the People's Liberation Army's 116th Division occupied the airport without encountering resistance. Shortly thereafter, Yongning Airport was renamed Nanning Airport.

In October 1958, because Nanning Airport was too close to the urban area and its facilities had become outdated, it was decided that a new airport was needed to serve the city. The site for the new airport was selected in the Wuxu area, 31 kilometers from downtown Nanning.^{:313} Construction of Nanning Wuxu Airport began at the end of 1958, and the airport entered operation in November 1962, after which the management organization of the old Nanning Airport began relocating to the new Wuxu facility.^{:313} When first built, the runway was 2,400 meters long and 45 meters wide, constructed primarily of reinforced concrete, and capable of handling aircraft such as the An‑2, C‑46, and C‑47.

In 1989, in response to growing aviation demand and with approval from the Civil Aviation Administration of China, an investment of 22 million yuan was allocated to upgrade the runway at Nanning Wuxu International Airport, which had been operating under heavy load for nearly thirty years. A concrete overlay, averaging 22 to 26 centimeters in thickness, was added to the existing runway, taxiways, and apron, and the runway was extended 300 meters to the south. A full set of supporting facilities, including upgraded runway lighting, was also completed, raising the airport's operational standards and enabling MD‑82 aircraft to take off and land safely. By 1990, total cumulative investment in Nanning Airport construction had exceeded 51.7 million yuan, allowing it to accommodate the MD‑82 and all smaller aircraft types.

In July 1995, Nanning Wuxu Airport began construction of a new terminal building with a floor area of 25,885 square meters, along with an expanded apron and newly built taxiways. The new terminal entered service in April 1998 and was designed to handle an annual passenger throughput of 2.5 million. The cargo warehouse covered 2,000 square meters and had a planned annual cargo‑and‑mail capacity of 30,000 tons.

In 2003, the airport was officially renamed Nanning Wuxu International Airport.

In 2006, Nanning Wuxu International Airport expanded its apron to 124,000 square meters and added two new Class‑E parking stands for large aircraft, along with a 315‑meter taxiway. These upgrades enabled the airport to accommodate wide‑body aircraft such as the Boeing 747.

In December 2008, Nanning Wuxu International Airport commissioned a new airfield, which included a newly built runway. The new runway measured 3,200 meters in length and 45 meters in width, with 7.5‑meter shoulders on both sides. At the same time, the old runway was extended 500 meters to the north and converted into a taxiway. Additional rapid‑exit taxiways and several perpendicular taxiways were constructed between the runway and the new taxiway system, and the apron and aircraft stands were also expanded. These upgrades significantly enhanced the airport's operational capacity and ensured the safe arrival and departure of the special aircraft carrying national leaders attending the China-ASEAN Summit that year.

In 2010, Nanning Wuxu International Airport undertook another expansion of its existing terminal area as an interim measure to cope with rapidly increasing traffic before the new terminal complex was completed. The project included a 6,815‑square‑meter northward extension of the existing terminal building, along with interior renovations. The apron was expanded to the north, a new taxiway was constructed, and the northern section of the airport's cargo terminal was enlarged by an additional 2,928 square meters.

In October 2011, construction began on the new terminal area and supporting facilities at Nanning Wuxu International Airport. The project was designed to meet the airport's projected 2020 capacity requirements: 16 million passengers annually (13.6 million domestic and 2.4 million international) along with a peak‑hour throughput of 6,027 passengers, 164,000 tons of cargo and mail, and 137,600 aircraft movements.

Major components of the project included the construction of a new 3,200‑meter parallel taxiway on the east side of the existing runway, with additional segments of a second parallel taxiway built at the eastern ends of the system. The plan also called for a 50‑stand apron, a new 189,000‑square‑meter terminal building, and a full suite of auxiliary and public‑service facilities such as administrative offices, fire‑rescue stations, power and water supply systems, cooling plants, and access roads. The project further encompassed air‑traffic‑control works, facilities for the CAAC Guangxi Regulatory Bureau, on‑airport and off‑airport fuel‑supply systems, and the construction of Shenzhen Airlines' Nanning base. The total investment for the project was approximately 8 billion yuan.

On September 25, 2014, Terminal 2 of Nanning Wuxu International Airport officially opened.

Construction of Terminal 3 began in January 2023, with a designed annual passenger throughput of 34 million. The project is expected to be completed in 2027.

== Airlines and destinations ==
=== Passenger ===
Airlines	Destinations
AirAsia	Kuala Lumpur–International
Air Cambodia	Phnom Penh
Air China	Beijing–Capital, Beijing–Daxing, Chengdu–Tianfu, Hangzhou, Tianjin
Air Macau	Macau
Batik Air	Charter: Jakarta–Soekarno-Hatta
Beijing Capital Airlines	Enshi, Haikou, Hangzhou, Jieyang, Jingzhou, Lijiang, Qingdao
China Eastern Airlines	Hefei, Jinggangshan, Kunming, Nanchang, Nanjing, Ningbo, Qingdao, Shanghai–Pudong, Taiyuan
China Southern Airlines	Beijing–Daxing, Changchun, Changsha, Chengdu–Tianfu, Chongqing, Guangzhou, Hangzhou, Harbin, Haikou, Nanjing, Ningbo, Qingdao, Shanghai–Pudong, Shenyang, Ürümqi, Wuhan, Xiamen, Xi'an, Yancheng, Zhengzhou
Fuzhou Airlines	Fuzhou
GX Airlines	Bangkok–Suvarnabhumi, Bozhou, Changsha, Chengdu–Tianfu, Dalian, Fuyang, Ganzhou, Haikou, Hai Phong, Hanoi, Harbin, Hohhot, Huai'an, Jakarta–Soekarno-Hatta, Jiayuguan, Jinan, Jining, Luoyang, Qingdao, Shenyang, Shiyan, Vientiane, Wanzhou, Xi'an, Xiangyang, Xining, Xuzhou, Yichang, Yulin (Shaanxi), Zhangjiajie
Hainan Airlines	Beijing–Capital, Dalian, Haikou, Harbin, Nanchang, Sanya, Tianjin, Xi'an
Hebei Airlines	Beijing–Daxing
Juneyao Air	Nanjing, Shanghai–Hongqiao, Wuxi, Wenzhou
Lao Airlines	Vientiane
Loong Air	Wenzhou
Okay Airways	Chongqing, Hefei, Sanya, Tianjin, Yinchuan
Qingdao Airlines	Changchun, Hefei, Ningbo, Qingdao, Taizhou
Royal Brunei Airlines	Bandar Seri Begawan
Ruili Airlines	Xishuangbanna
Scoot	Singapore
Shandong Airlines	Harbin, Jinan, Qingdao, Quzhou, Wuhan
Shanghai Airlines	Shanghai–Hongqiao, Shanghai–Pudong, Wenzhou
Shenzhen Airlines	Beijing–Capital, Changchun, Changzhou, Chengdu–Tianfu, Chongqing, Fuzhou, Harbin, Hefei, Hong Kong, Lianyungang, Linyi, Manila, Nanchang, Nanjing, Nantong, Quanzhou, Shenyang, Shenzhen, Taiyuan, Wuhan, Wuxi, Xi'an, Yuncheng, Zhengzhou
Sichuan Airlines	Chengdu–Shuangliu, Chengdu–Tianfu, Guangyuan, Hangzhou, Harbin, Jinan, Luzhou, Nanchang, Tianjin, Ürümqi, Wuhan
Spring Airlines	Bangkok–Suvarnabhumi, Dalian, Ningbo, Shijiazhuang, Yangzhou
Suparna Airlines	Fuzhou, Shanghai–Pudong, Zhengzhou
Tianjin Airlines	Haikou, Wuhan
West Air	Taiyuan, Yangon, Zhengzhou
XiamenAir	Fuzhou, Hangzhou, Quanzhou, Xiamen
Xizang Airlines	Lhasa, Mianyang

=== Cargo ===
Airlines	Destinations
Central Airlines	Bangkok–Suvarnabhumi, Ho Chi Minh City
China Cargo Airlines	Shanghai–Pudong
China Postal Airlines	Nanchang, Nanjing
Longhao Airlines	Bangkok–Suvarnabhumi, Ho Chi Minh City, Yangon, Zhengzhou
Raya Airways	Kuala Lumpur–Subang
Royal Air Philippines	Clark
SF Airlines	Hangzhou, Ho Chi Minh City, Shenzhen
Sichuan Airlines	Singapore
Tianjin Air Cargo	Clark, Dhaka, Ho Chi Minh City, Manila, Singapore, Yangon
YTO Cargo Airlines	Chennai, Delhi, Dhaka, Karachi, Kuala Lumpur–International, Singapore

== Ground transportation ==
Beside parking facilities and taxis, two airport bus lines connect the airport with the city center: Line No. 1 serving the Chaoyang Road Airline Ticket Office (near the Nanning Railway Station) and Line No. 2 serving Wuxiang Square. The Nanning–Pingxiang high-speed railway has a dedicated station at the airport, Wuxu Airport Railway Station.

== See also ==
- List of airports in China
- List of the busiest airports in China
