= Wuxu Airport railway station =

Railway station in Nanning, Guangxi

Wuxu Jichang 吴圩机场
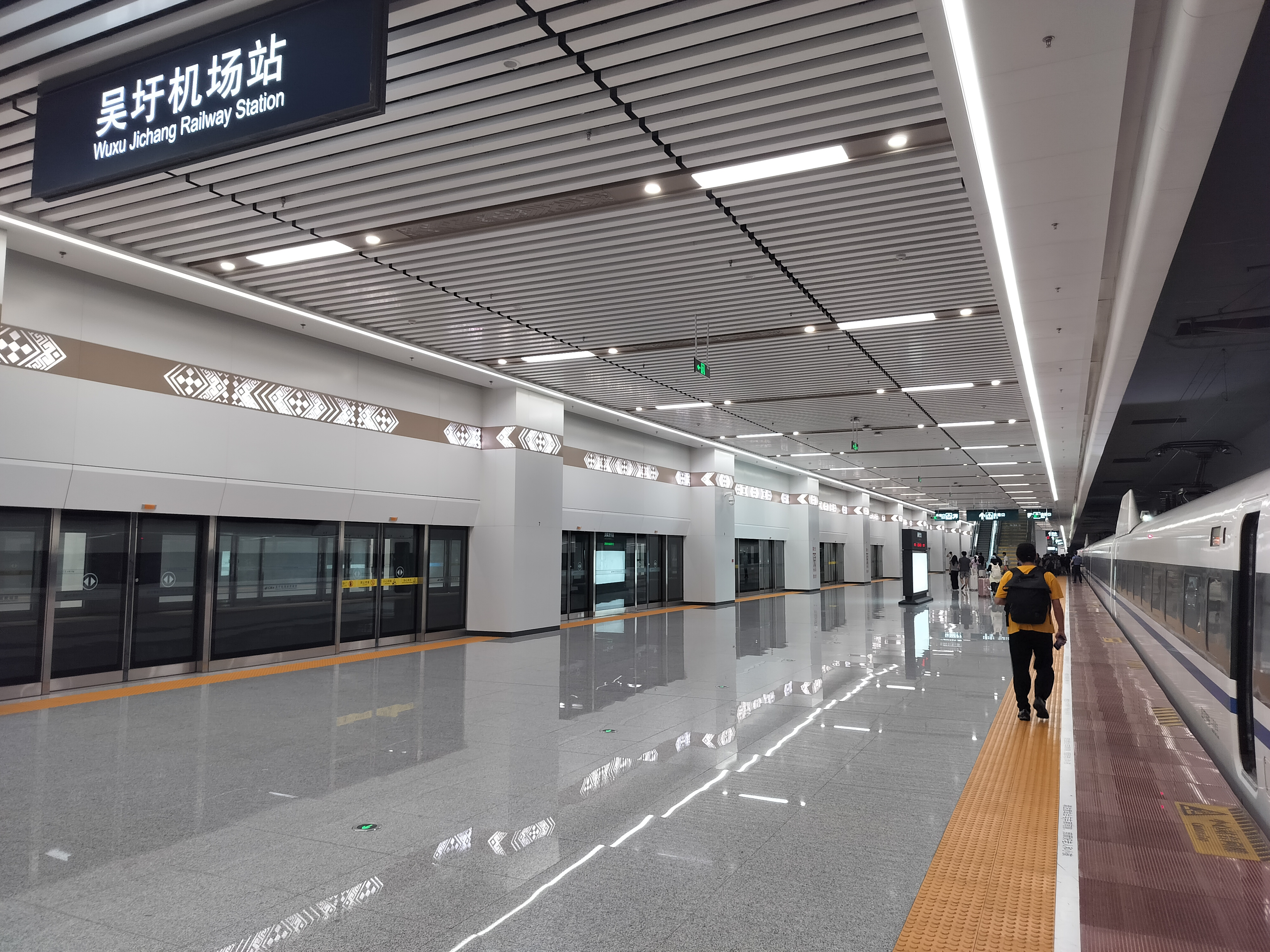

General information
- Location: Jiangnan District, Nanning, Guangxi; China
- Coordinates: 22°36′9.3″N 108°11′0.7″E
- Line: Nanning–Pingxiang high-speed railway
- Connections: Nanning Wuxu International Airport
Location

Wuxu Jichang (Wuxu Airport) railway station (Chinese: 吴圩机场站; pinyin: Wúxū Jīchǎng zhàn) is a railway station in Jiangnan District, Nanning, Guangxi, China. It is an intermediate station on the Nanning–Pingxiang high-speed railway. The station opened on 5 December 2022.

The railway station is adjacent to Terminal 2 of Nanning Wuxu International Airport. The planned Terminal 3 will be located at the other side of the station.

| Preceding station | China Railway High-speed | Following station |
|---|---|---|
| Nanning Terminus | Nanning–Pingxiang high-speed railway | Fusui South towards Pingxiang East |
