= Wuhan Nanhu Airport =

Former airport in Wuhan, China (1936–1995)

Wuhan Nanhu Airport 武汉南湖机场
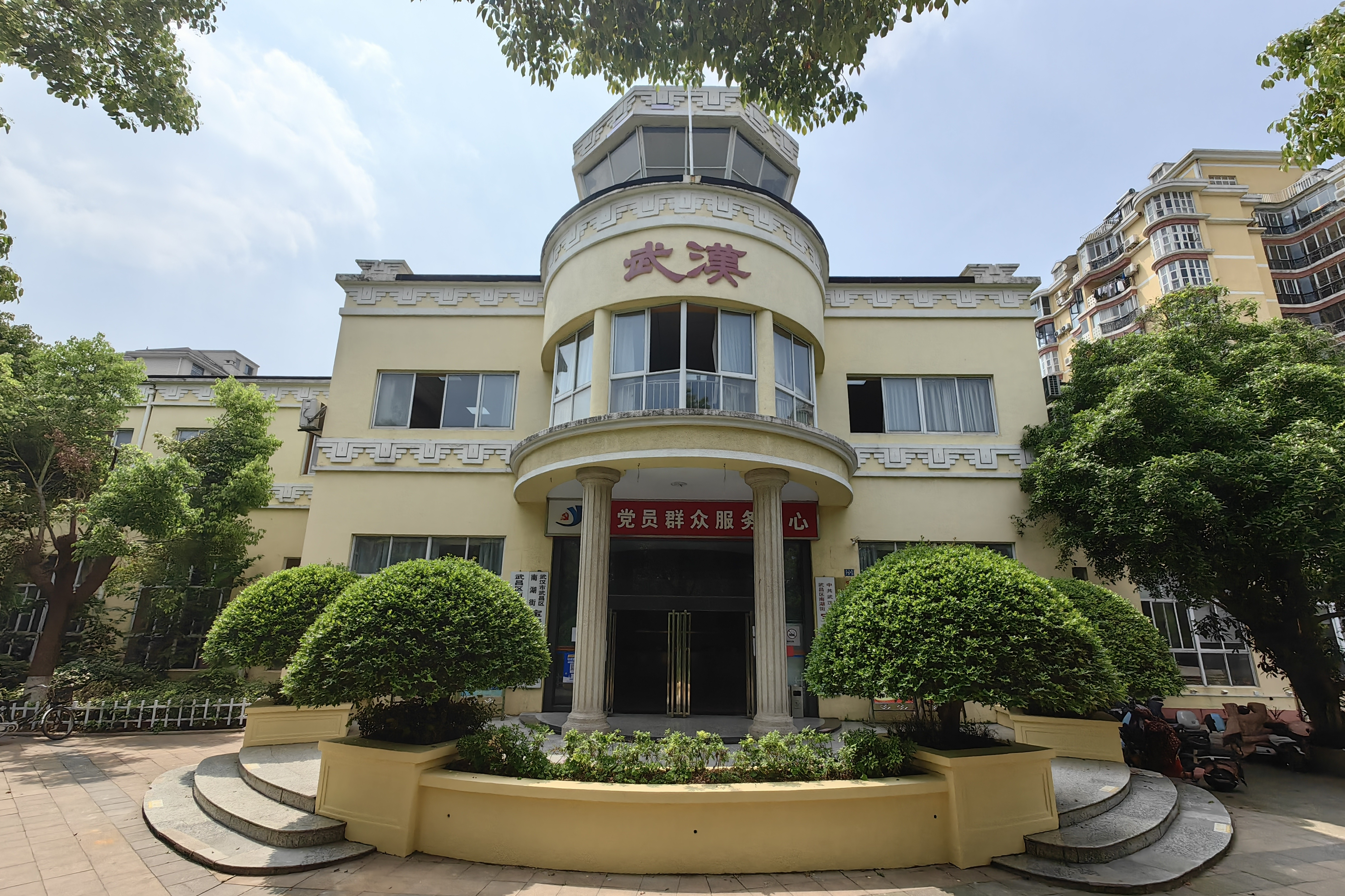
- The former control tower of Nanhu Airport in 2024
- IATA: ~~WUH~~; ICAO: ~~ZHHH~~

Summary
- Airport type: Defunct
- Serves: Wuhan
- Location: Wuchang, Wuhan, Hubei, China
- Opened: 1936
- Closed: 15 April 1995
- Coordinates: 30°30′35.13″N 114°18′45.67″E

Map
- Location in Hubei Location in China

Runways
Direction	Length		Surface
Direction	ft	m	Surface
18/36	5,945	1,812	Concrete
~~08/26~~	4,757	1,450	~~Concrete~~

Wuhan Nanhu Airport ~~(IATA: WUH, ICAO: ZHHH)~~ was an airport that served Wuhan, the capital of South Central China's Hubei province. Built in 1936, the airport served as a military air base during the Republic of China period, before being converted to a civilian airport after the founding of the People's Republic of China. The airport closed in 1995, and most of its flights were transferred to Wuhan Tianhe International Airport.

== Operational history ==
=== Republic of China ===
After the 1911 Revolution, the Hubei Military Government formed an aviation team. Pan Shizhong, a member of the team, built an airship hangar in Nanhu Lake to prepare for airship operations. During World War I, airplanes began to play a role in the military field. After that, the Nationalist government built aircraft repair hangars in various places across the country, including in Nanhu.

In 1936, to defend against threats from invading Japanese forces, the Hubei provincinal government started the construction of an airport on the bank of South Lake (after which the airport is named after) in Wuchang District. The completed airport has one runway in the east-west direction paved with gravel, and was managed by the Republic of China Air Force (ROCAF). In 1938, after the outbreak of the Battle of Wuhan, the Military Affairs Commission made the decision to abandon the city, and troops in the city destroyed the remaining key infrastructure, including Nanhu Airport.

After the takeover of the city by Japanese forces and the airport coming under Japanese control, the existing runway was renovated, expanded and newly paved with cement. In addition, a new north-south runway was built. The Japanese used forced labour to complete the works. In the meantime, anti-war sentiments emerged among occupying Japanese troops due to the pyrrhic victory during the Battle of Wuhan. On 19 January 1939, Japanese ground workers at Nanhu Airport started a mutiny, in which 13 planes and one oil depot were destroyed.

Following the surrender of Japan, the control of Nanhu Airport was returned to the ROCAF. In 1947, the Civil Aeronautics Administration (CAA) established an air traffic control centre at Nanhu Airport, with Xujiapeng Airport established as the primary civilian airport. The following year, due to heavy rain causing the runway at Xujiapeng Airport to become unusable, the CAA sought permission from the ROCAF to temporarily allow civilian airliners to enter Nanhu Airport. In the same year, the CAA decided to abolish the east-west runway and renovate the north-south runway. The airport was used by China National Aviation Corporation (CNAC) and Central Air Transport (CATC).

Shortly prior to the takeover of the city by the People's Liberation Army (PLA), the airport was abandoned and both the CNAC and CATC offices were evacuated. After PLA occupied the city, the airport management was transferred to the Civil Aviation Administration of China (CAAC), and the east-west runway was repaired for operations.

=== People's Republic of China ===
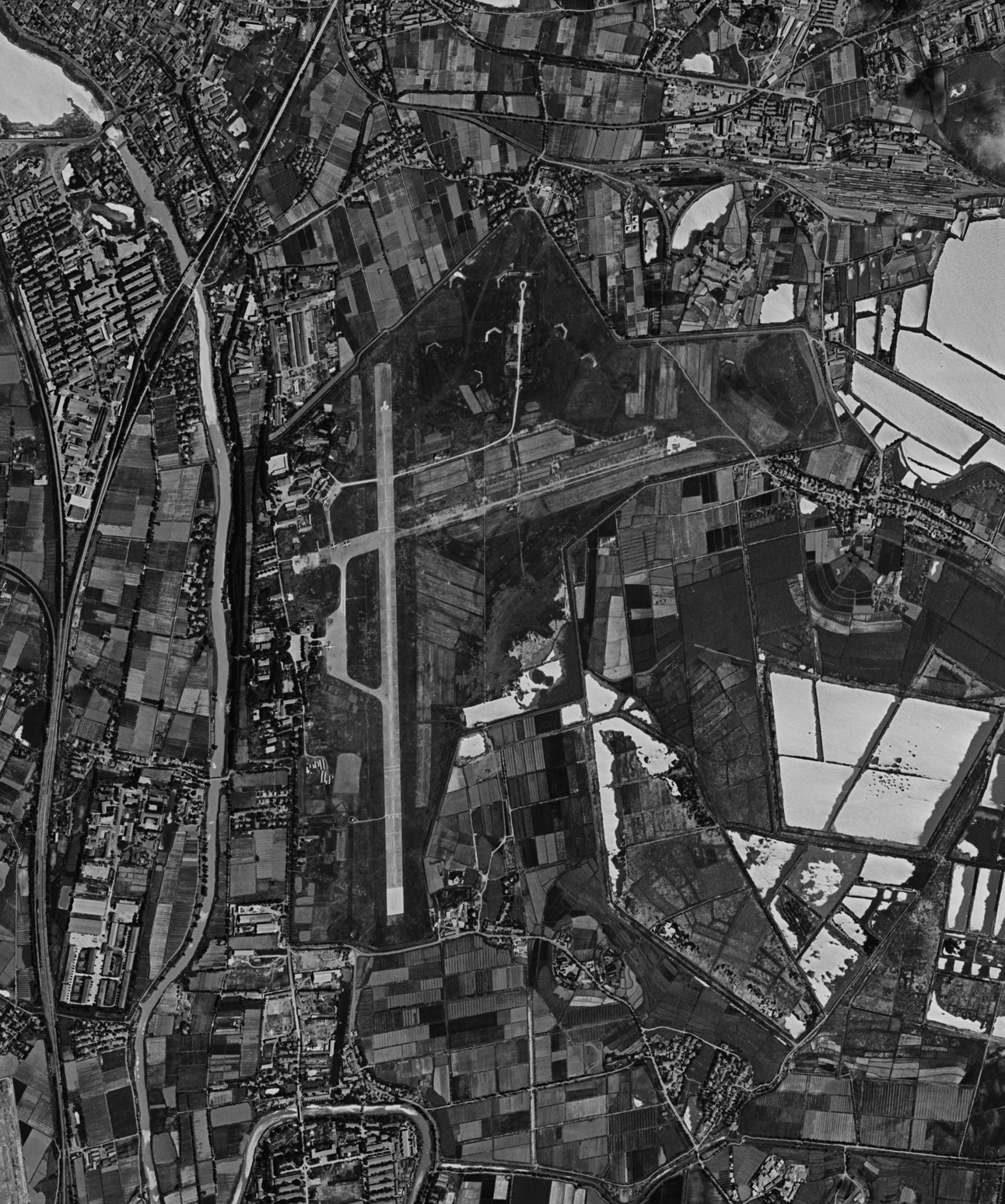
Satellite imagery of Nanhu Airport in 1978

After the founding of the People's Republic of China, the CAAC, under the direction of Zhou Enlai, established two flights from Wuhan: Tianjin-Wuhan-Guangzhou and Tianjin-Wuhan-Chongqing. Although the flights were planned to stop at Wangjiadun Airport, the planes made their stopover at Nanhu Airport instead. A welcome ceremony was held when the two flights landed at Nanhu Airport for the first time on 1 August 1950. The airport was re-designated as a civilian airport the following year, and opened scheduled flights to Beijing, Shanghai and Chongqing.

In 1953, Nanhu Airport was renovated, with works including the extension and repairs of the north-south runway, aprons and terminals. This was the second largest airport expansion project in China at the time, following works carried out at Tianjin Zhangguizhuang Airport (present day Tianjin Binhai International Airport). The north-south runway after renovation was 1,300 metres (4,300 ft) long and 50 metres (160 ft) wide.

In 1974, to accommodate larger airplanes such as the Antonov An-24, the runway length was further extended to 1,492 metres (4,895 ft). From 1976 to 1984, more renovation works were carried out to the airport premises in order for flights using larger planes to land at the airport.

As part of the sixth five-year plan, Nanhu Airport underwent several expansions. Following a successful test flight on a Boeing 737-200, the runway was extended and thickened, and the apron was widened to meet the requirements of the aircraft. Another expansion took place in 1985, in which the runway was further extended by 200 metres (660 ft), the apron was expanded by 24,000 square metres (260,000 sq ft) and 2,000 square metres (22,000 sq ft) of terminal space was built. By the end of the year, the runway of Nanhu Airport is 1,812 metres (5,945 ft) long, 50 metres (160 ft) wide and 0.24 metres (0.79 ft) thick, capable of handling the Boeing 737-200 and other smaller aircraft; the apron is 46,000 square meters, and can park more than ten 737-200s at the same time. Flights to Hong Kong were opened in 1987 following approval from the State Council of China. In 1988, the total passenger volume at Nanhu Airport surpassed 500,000.

=== Closure ===
Despite several expansion works carried out over the years, Nanhu Airport was unable to meet the needs of Wuhan's urban and civil aviation development. Its 1,812-meter runway was still the shortest among all civil airports in provincial capitals across the country at that time. In addition, the airport's oil depot has a small capacity and no dedicated railway line, requiring delivery by trucks. Trucks traveling to and from the airport have to pass a railway crossing on the Beijing–Guangzhou railway, causing congested traffic. The built-up surrounding area resulted in no more space for further expansion. There were plans for a new airport to be built as far back as 1958; these did not go through due to various reasons.

In July 1985, following approval from the State Council and the Central Military Commission, construction for the new Wuhan Tianhe Airport started in the town of Tianhe in Huangpi County (present day Huangpi District). On 4 January 1992, the State Council and the Central Military Commission approved the decommissioning of Nanhu Airport, and required the CAAC to transfer the ownership of the land to the city government.

Following the completion of Tianhe Airport in April 1995, relocation works began on the 4 April. On 14 April, the last inbound flight landed at Nanhu Airport at 22:19. The airport officially closed on the following day with the opening of Tianhe Airport.

== Post-closure ==
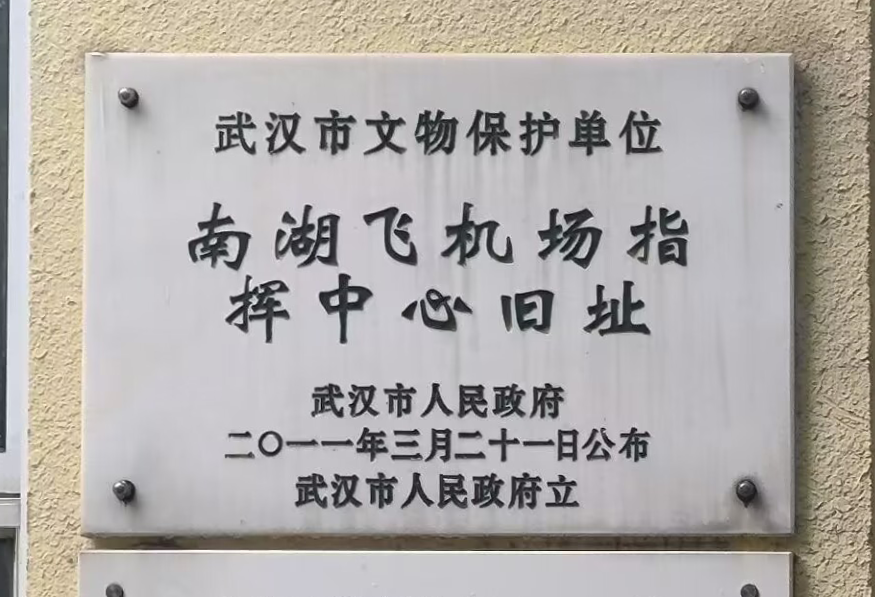
Plaque listing the former airport control tower as a protected heritage site

After ownership of the airport was transferred to the city government, the land was sold to China Baoan Group for real estate development. The former runway was rebuilt to become Heng'an Road.

In 2011, the former airport control tower building was listed as a protected heritage site in the city of Wuhan. It is currently being used as the office for the residents' committee of the surrounding housing estate and the property management office for China Baoan Group.
