= Nanning–Pingxiang high-speed railway =

High-speed rail line in China

Overview
- Native name: 南凭高速铁路
- Status: Operational
- Termini: Nanning; Pingxiang East

Service
- Operator(s): China Railway Nanning Group

Technical
- Line length: 119.3 km (74.1 mi) (Nanning–Chongzuo South)
- Track gauge: 1,435 mm (4 ft 8 1/2 in)
- Operating speed: 250 km/h (155 mph)

Nanning–Pingxiang high-speed railway is a high-speed railway between Nanning and Pingxiang in Guangxi, China. Rather than being a central government initiative, this project is largely being coordinated at a regional level, in Guangxi.

== History ==
The railway is being built in two sections: Nanning to Chongzuo, and Chongzuo to Pingxiang. Construction on the Nanning to Chongzuo section started on 28 October 2018. Construction on the Chongzuo to Pingxiang section started on 28 September 2020.

Erection of the overhead wires for the Nanning to Chongzuo section began in December 2020.

The Nanning to Chongzuo section was opened on 5 December 2022.

== Route ==
Between Fusui South and Pingxiang East, the line runs roughly parallel to the Hunan–Guangxi railway.

=== Stations ===
Station Name	Chinese	Transport connections
Nanning	南宁	1 2
Wuxu Airport	吴圩机场	Nanning Wuxu Airport
Fusui South	扶绥南	
Qujiu South (reserved)	渠旧南	
Chongzuo South	崇左南	
Ningming East	宁明东	
Longzhou	龙州	
Pingxiang East	凭祥东	

== Future Development ==
It would connect to railways in northern Vietnam, and this line is seen as the first stage of a high-speed network reaching as far as Singapore. Cross-border traffic will connect to the proposed North-South Express Railway.
