= Wuhan Tianhe International Airport =

Airport serving Wuhan, Hubei, China

Wuhan Tianhe International Airport 武汉天河国际机场
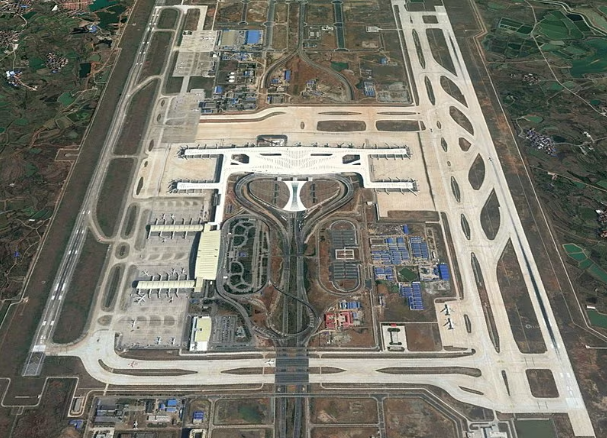
- IATA: WUH; ICAO: ZHHH

Summary
- Airport type: Public
- Operator: Wuhan Tianhe International Airport Co. Ltd.
- Serves: Wuhan
- Location: Huangpi, Wuhan, Hubei, China
- Opened: 15 April 1995; 31 years ago
- Hub for: China Eastern Airlines; China Southern Airlines
- Focus city for: Air China
- Elevation AMSL: 34.5 m (113 ft)
- Coordinates: 30°47′06″N 114°12′24″E
- Website: www.whairport.com

Maps
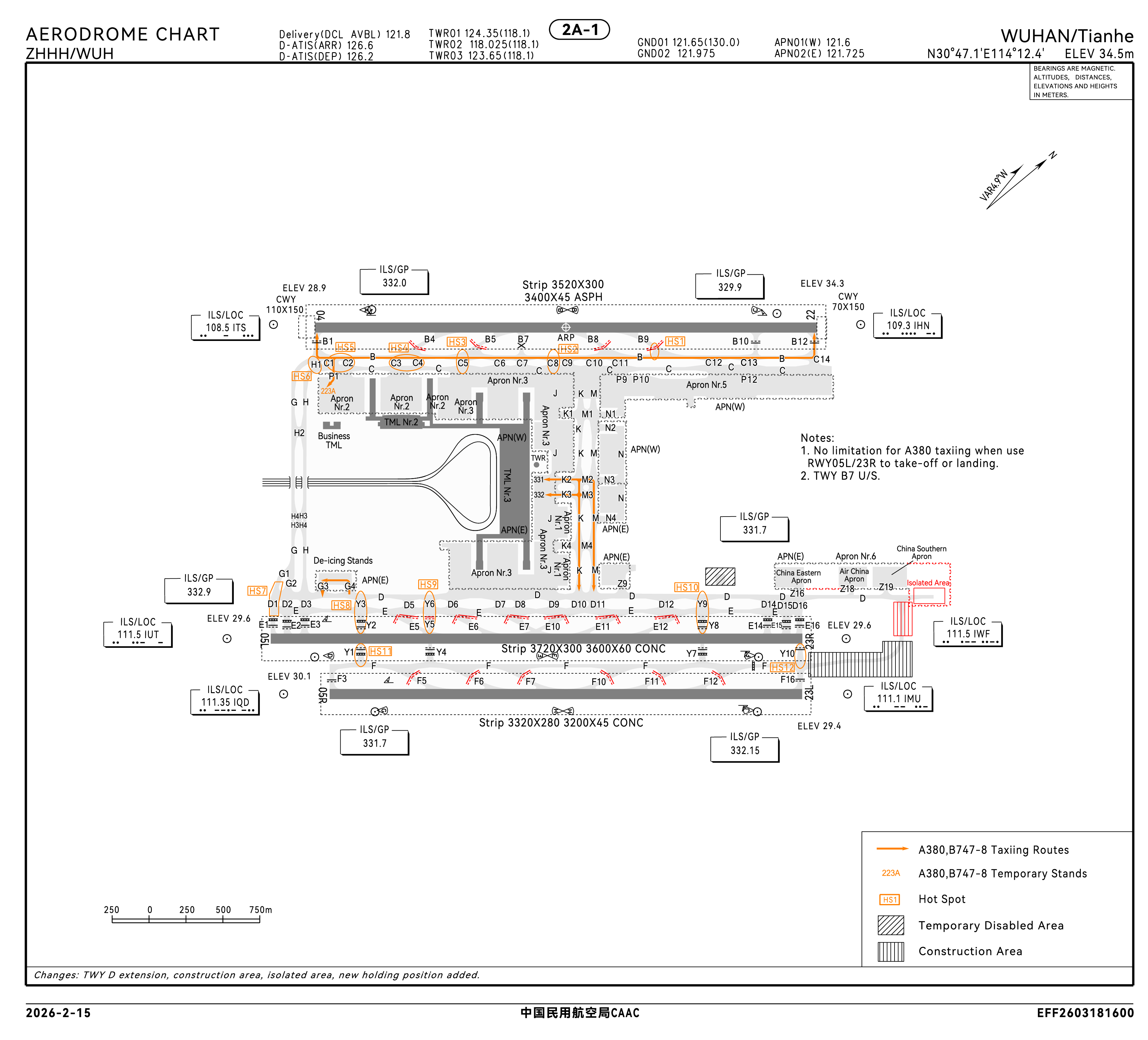
- CAAC airport chart

- Location in Hubei Location in China

Runways
Direction	Length		Surface
Direction	m	ft	Surface
04/22	3,400	11,155	Asphalt
05L/23R	3,600	11,811	Concrete
05R/23L	3,200	10,499	Concrete

Statistics (2025)
- Passengers: 31,339,277 ▼0.2%
- Cargo (Metric tonnes): 179,668.7 ▲3.8%
- Aircraft movements: 219,454 ▼0.9%
- Sources:CAAC

Wuhan Tianhe International Airport
- Simplified Chinese: 武汉天河国际机场
- Traditional Chinese: 武漢天河國際機場
Transcriptions
Standard Mandarin
- Hanyu Pinyin: Wǔhàn Tiānhé Guójì Jīchǎng

Wuhan Tianhe International Airport (IATA: WUH, ICAO: ZHHH) is an international airport serving Wuhan, the capital of South Central China's Hubei province. It was opened on 15 April 1995, replacing the old Wuhan Wangjiadun Airport and Nanhu Airport as the major airport of Wuhan. The airport is located in Wuhan's suburban Huangpi District, around 26 km (16 mi) to the north of Wuhan city center.

It is the busiest airport in central China as it is geographically located in the centre of China's airline route network. The airport served 31,339,277 passengers in 2025, making it the 14th busiest airport by passenger traffic in China. The airport is a hub for China Eastern Airlines and China Southern Airlines while serving as a focus city for Air China. The name Tianhe (天河) can be literally translated as "Sky River"; Tianhe is also one of the names for the Milky Way in ancient Chinese.

Since 2019, passengers from 53 countries such as the EU countries, Japan, the Republic of Korea, Russia, and the U.S., when transiting to a third country, can enter China from this airport without a Chinese visa for up to 144 hours.

== History ==
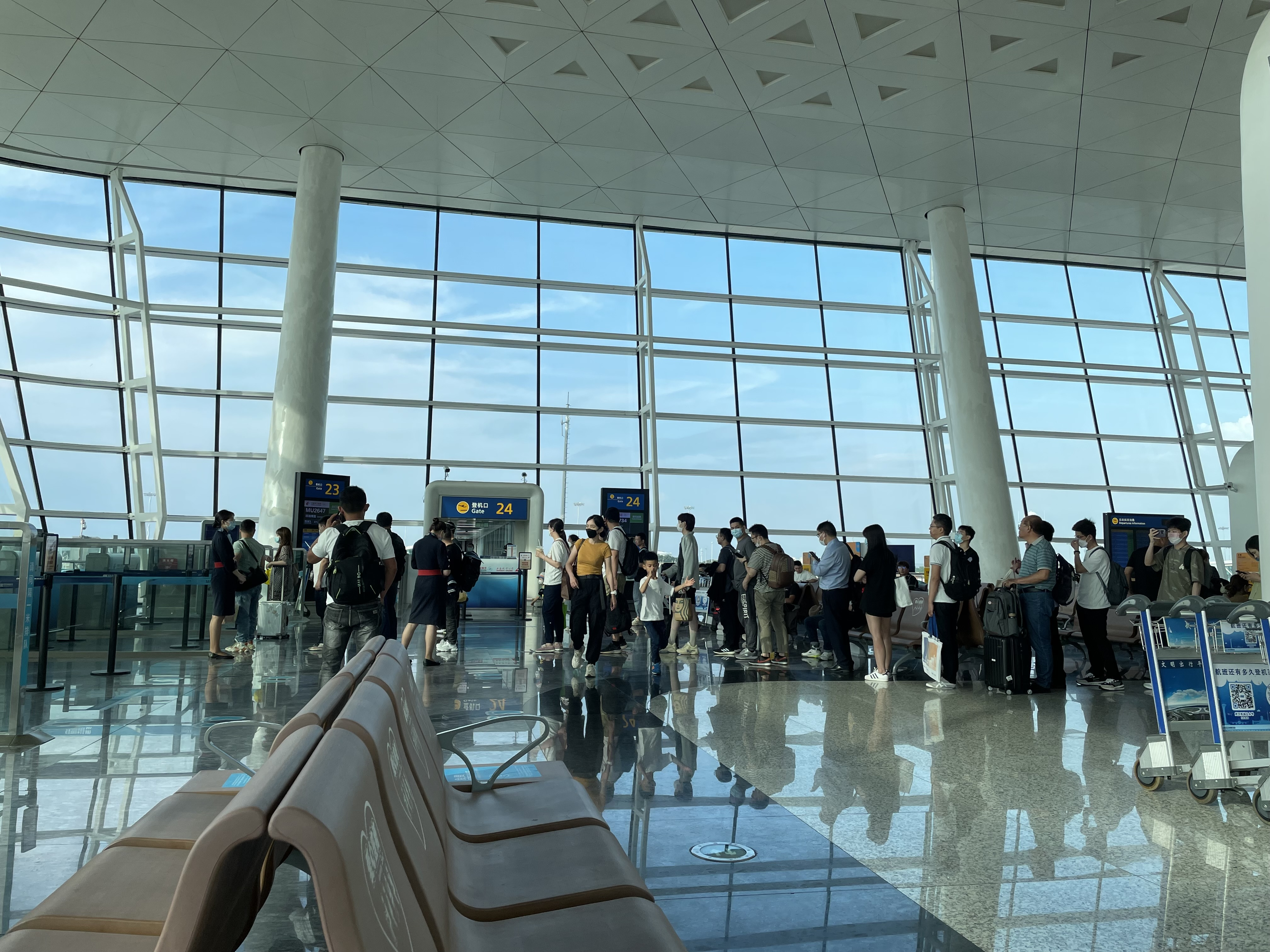
Gates at Terminal 3

To replace the old Wangjiadun Airport and Nanhu Airport, the Chinese government permitted plans to build a commercial airport in Tianhe Town, Huangpi District, Wuhan on 1 July 1985. The first term construction started in December 1989 and finished in April 1994. It initially operated domestic flights but later in 2000, the CAA re-designated it as an international airport.

Nanhu Airport was the main airport of Wuhan before 1995. Although built in 1936 as a military airport and 1951 as a civil airport, it was located near the city center, and by 1994, air traffic had greatly increased and the airport was too small to handle larger amount of passengers. The first international flight from and to Wuhan only started on Halloween 1992, when Wuhan-Vientiane route was opened.

The airport was opened on 15 April 1995, and the old Nanhu Airport was closed at the same time. Any passengers still waiting at Nanhu Airport were immediately taken by bus to the new Tianhe Airport. Wangjiadun Airport was still open at that time, but mainly for military operations, and was closed and then demolished in 2007.

The airport has expanded three times – first for terminal 2 and second for terminal 3, a new control tower, and the second runway. The third expansion was started in 2022 and completed in early 2025, adding a third runway (3,200 meters long). Future plans include adding a fourth terminal, a satellite terminal, and potentially a fourth runway. Wuhan opened up to intercontinental flights when Air France began service from Paris on 11 April 2012, and two years later opened up to the United States non-stop when China Southern Airlines announced, in September 2014, a daily non-stop flight to San Francisco, originating from Guangzhou, operating with a Boeing 787 to begin 16 December 2014.

On 23 January 2020, the airport was closed due to the 2020 Hubei lockdowns in response to the COVID-19 pandemic, where the first outbreak happened in Wuhan. The airport reopened on 8 April 2020 following a large-scale disinfection.

== Facilities ==
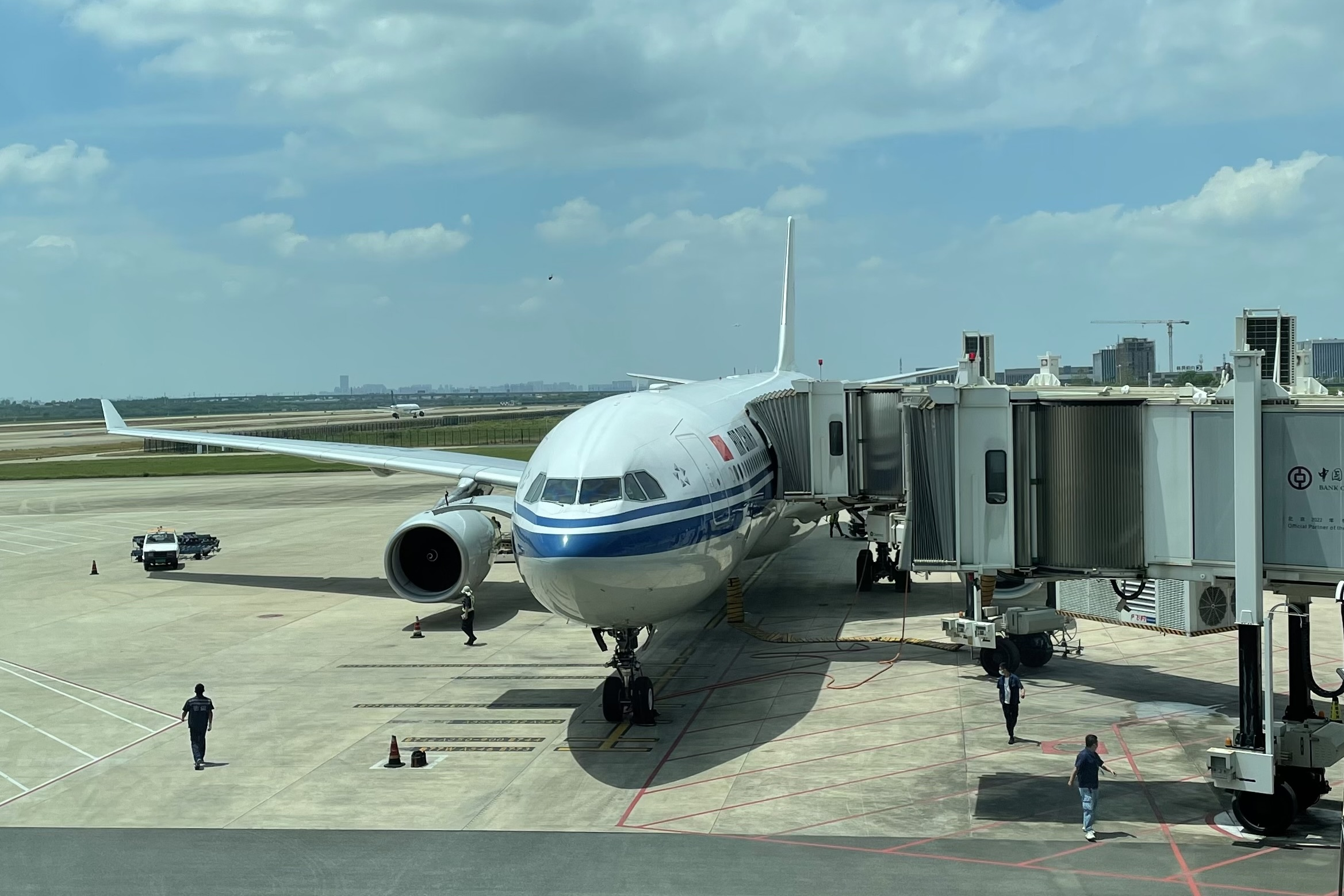
An Air China Airbus A330-300 at Wuhan Tianhe International Airport

=== Runways ===
Tianhe International Airport has three runways:

- Runway West (04/22) with a length of 3,400 m (11,200 ft) and width of 45 m (148 ft), equipped with asphalt surface. Runway 04 is able for ILS CAT II, runway 22 able for ILS CATI.
- Runway East 1 (05L/23R) with a length of 3,600 m (11,800 ft) and width of 60 m (200 ft), equipped with concrete surface. Runway 05L is able for ILS CAT II, runway 23R able for ILS CAT I.
- Runway East 2 (05R/23L) with a length of 3,200 m (10,500 ft), equipped with concrete surface.

=== Terminals ===
==== Terminal 1 (demolished) ====
Terminal 1 was opened in 1995 when all flight services were transferred from Nanhu Airport to Tianhe International Airport. It was located at where the west concourse of Terminal 3 stands nowadays. It had been the only terminal of the airport until Terminal 2 was completed in 2008.

From 2008 onwards, all domestic flights were operated at T2 while international flights were still operated at T1. T1 was closed in 2010 after serving international flights for two years. A new international terminal was built in 2010, and has undergone subsequent expansions after seeing major increase of international travelers. The terminal was demolished during the construction of Terminal 3.

==== Terminal 2 ====
Terminal 2 was the main terminal for Tianhe Airport during 2008–2017, which handled only domestic airlines. It has a floor area of 121,200 square meters and a designed capacity to handle 13 million passengers and 320,000 tons of cargo a year. The project was completed on 15 April 2008, at a total cost of 3.37 billion yuan (421.5 million US dollars). By 2010, Wuhan served at least five international and 100 domestic routes. The airport's cargo-handling capacity is to reach 144,000 tons.

Terminal 2 was closed when Terminal 3 were officially opened in mid-2017 for the upgrade construction, and it reopened on 15 April 2024.

==== Fixed-base operator (formerly the International Terminal) ====
The International Terminal was opened in December 2010 and all international flights and flights to Hong Kong, Macau and Taiwan operated at the International Terminal from 2010 to 2017. After the old Terminal 1 was closed in 2010, the International Terminal was sometimes mistakenly called "T1" by passengers.

The single-floor terminal is located at the southwest of Terminal 2. It has a floor area of 5310 square meters, shared by both departure and arrival facilities. To handle wide-body jet within limited ramp, there is no air-bridge for this terminal.

Due to its compact size and the growing number of international flights, there were complaints that Terminal 1 was "too crowded". In 2013, the average departure traffic was 880 per hour during the peak season, which was far greater than its designed maximum capacity of 550.

The International Terminal was closed in mid-2017 and then turned to a terminal for chartered flights and VIP flights in 2019, following the conclusion of 2019 Military World Games.

==== Terminal 3 ====
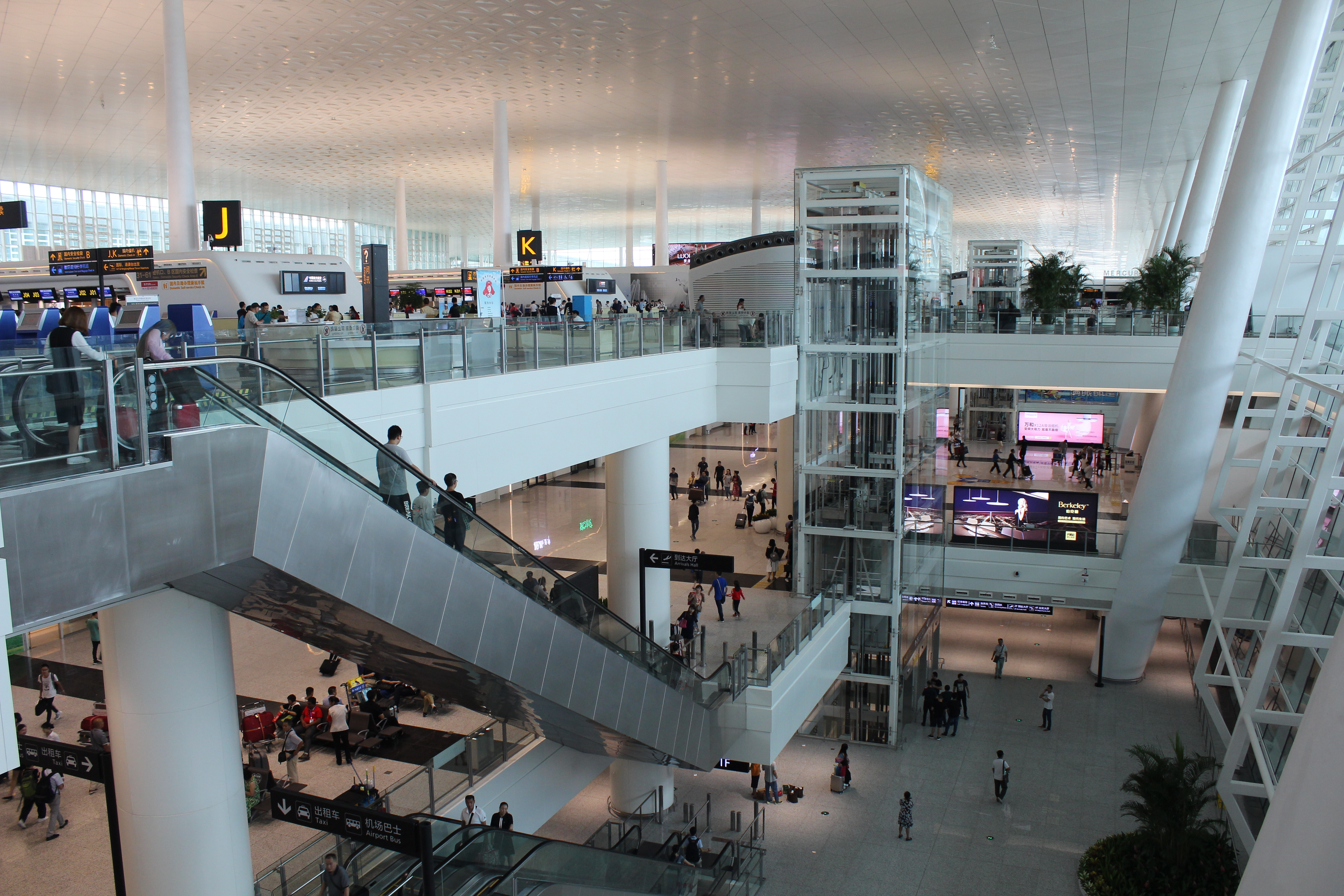
Multi-level view of Terminal 3

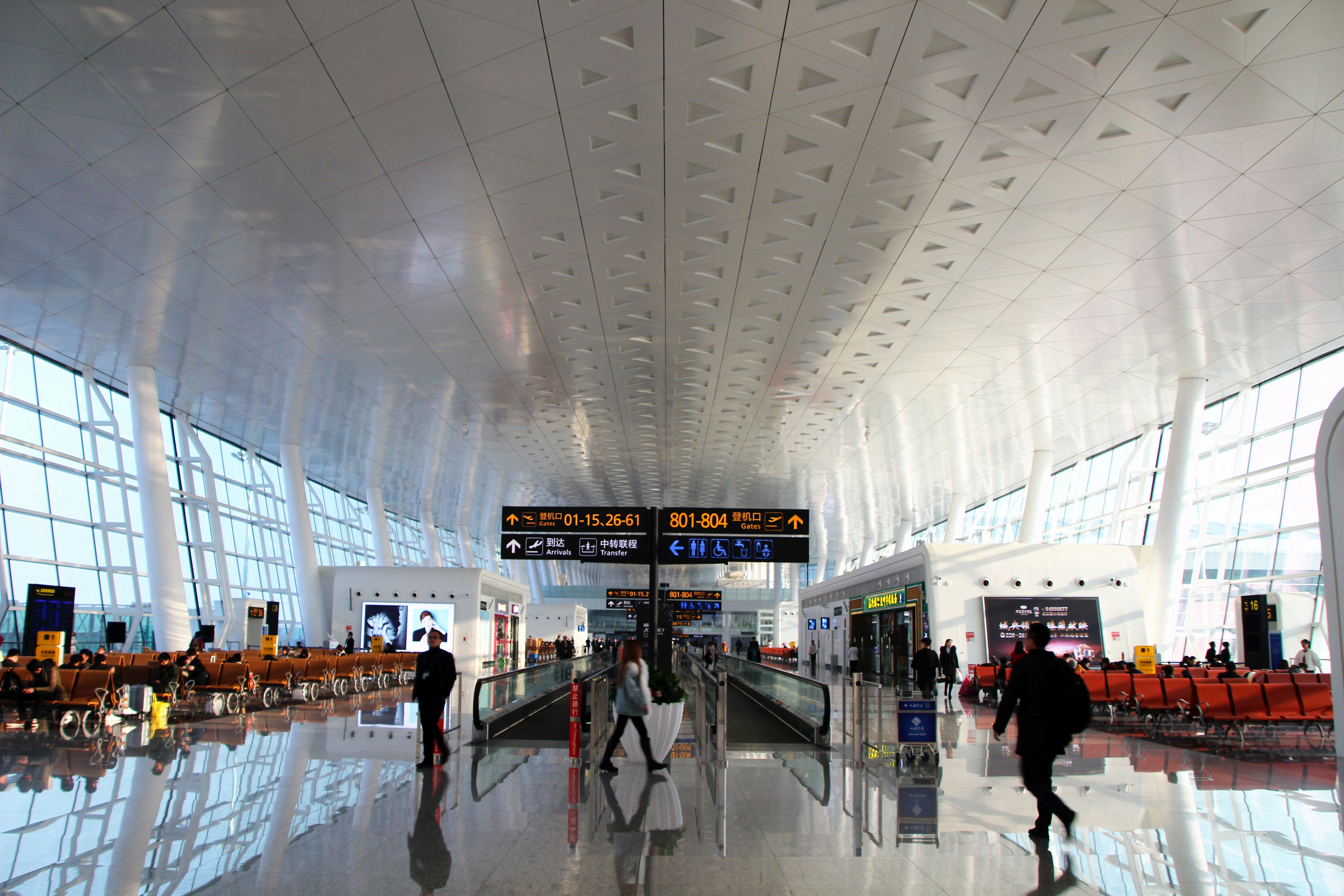
Terminal 3 domestic departure concourse A

Since 31 August 2017, all flights from the original International Terminal and T2 have been moved to Terminal 3, which has a passenger capacity of 35 million. Following the opening of the new Terminal 3, International Terminal (IT) and Terminal 2 (T2) were closed temporarily for renovation. T2 will undergo renovation and reopen when passengers in T3 exceed the design limit. However, and has since re-opened as the expended Terminal 2 for domestic flights only. The T3 has a new departure lounge, restaurants and duty-free shops.

The construction of Terminal 3 started in June 2013 and it was opened on 31 August 2017. A new runway, new control tower, and a transportation hub connecting the airport to the city with an intercity railway and a metro line have been built and opened along with the new terminal.

== Future development ==
According to the 2019–2025 development plan by Hubei Provincial Development and Reform Commission, the fourth terminal, a new satellite terminal and a third runway will be built.

Presently, Tianhe is the only passenger airport in the Wuhan metropolitan area proper; the second closest passenger airport to the city would be the Ezhou Huahu International Airport in the nearby city of Ezhou. Wuhan Hannan General Airport only serves general aviation.

In the early 2010s, the city authorities were considering repurposing the military Shanpo Airfield (山坡机场; 30°05′17″N 114°18′52″E), located in the city's far southern suburbs (Shanpo Township, Jiangxia District), as a commercial cargo airport. If the plans are ever implemented, Shanpo will become Wuhan's second airport.

== Airlines and destinations ==
=== Passenger ===
Airlines	Destinations
9 Air	Chengde, Dalian, Guangzhou
Air China	Baotou, Beijing–Capital, Beijing–Daxing, Changchun, Chengdu–Shuangliu, Chengdu–Tianfu, Chongqing, Dazhou, Dunhuang, Guangzhou, Guiyang, Haikou, Hohhot, Huizhou, Jieyang, Korla, Lanzhou, Linfen, Macau, Nyingchi, Qingdao, Shenyang, Shenzhen, Tianjin, Ürümqi, Xiamen, Xi'an, Zhuhai
AirAsia	Kuala Lumpur–International
Beijing Capital Airlines	Dalian, Haikou, Lijiang, Qingdao, Sanya, Shenyang, Yantai
Cathay Pacific	Hong Kong
Chengdu Airlines	Beihai, Chengdu–Shuangliu, Fuzhou, Hotan, Lhasa, Shenyang, Taizhou, Yining
China Eastern Airlines	Bangkok–Suvarnabhumi, Beihai, Beijing–Daxing, Chengdu–Tianfu, Chongqing, Dali, Dalian, Datong, Dongying, Enshi, Fuzhou, Guangzhou, Guiyang, Haikou, Hangzhou, Hanoi, Hong Kong, Huai'an, Huizhou, Jiayuguan, Jieyang, Jinan, Jinzhou, Kaohsiung, Kuala Lumpur–International, Kunming, Lanzhou, Liuzhou, Ningbo, Ordos, Phnom Penh, Qingdao, Qionghai, Quanzhou, Rizhao, Sanya, Shanghai–Hongqiao, Shanghai–Pudong, Shennongjia, Shenyang, Shenzhen, Singapore, Sydney–Kingsford Smith, Taipei–Taoyuan, Taiyuan, Taizhou, Tianjin, Tokyo–Narita, Ürümqi, Vientiane, Wenzhou, Xiamen, Xi'an, Xining, Yancheng, Yantai, Yibin, Yinchuan, Yiwu, Yuncheng, Yulin (Shaanxi), Zhoushan, Zunyi–Xinzhou
China Express Airlines	Guiyang, Lianyungang, Zhangjiajie
China Southern Airlines	Bangkok–Don Mueang, Beijing–Daxing, Bole, Changchun, Changzhi, Chengdu–Tianfu, Chongqing, Dalian, Dubai–International, Enshi, Guangzhou, Guiyang, Haikou, Hangzhou, Harbin, Ho Chi Minh City, Hohhot, Huizhou, Jieyang, Jinchang, Kaohsiung, Kunming, Kuqa, Lanzhou, Linyi, London–Heathrow, Moscow–Sheremetyevo, Nagoya–Centrair, Nanning, Ningbo, Phuket, Qingdao, San Francisco, Sanya, Seoul–Incheon, Shanghai–Pudong, Shenyang, Shenzhen, Shiyan, Taipei–Taoyuan, Tianjin, Tokyo–Narita, Ulanhot, Ürümqi, Wenzhou, Xiamen, Xi'an, Xining, Xishuangbanna, Yinchuan, Yiwu, Zhangye, Zhuhai
Chongqing Airlines	Changchun, Chongqing, Guiyang
Colorful Guizhou Airlines	Lishui, Xingyi, Yibin
Fuzhou Airlines	Harbin
Grand China Air	Harbin
Hainan Airlines	Beijing–Capital, Changchun, Fuzhou, Haikou, Ningbo, Qingdao, Sanming, Sanya, Taiyuan, Tongren, Ürümqi, Wenzhou
Juneyao Air	Dalian, Hohhot, Lijiang, Shanghai–Hongqiao, Shanghai–Pudong
Korean Air	Seoul–Incheon
Kunming Airlines	Kunming
Loong Air	Aksu, Changchun, Hangzhou, Harbin, Wenzhou, Xishuangbanna, Yinchuan, Zhuhai
Lucky Air	Dali, Kunming, Lhasa, Lijiang, Tengchong
Mandarin Airlines	Taipei–Songshan
Okay Airways	Kunming
Ruili Airlines	Kunming, Mangshi, Xining
Scoot	Singapore
Shandong Airlines	Beijing–Capital, Guiyang, Jinan, Nanning, Qingdao, Shenyang, Taiyuan, Ürümqi, Xiamen, Yantai, Zhuhai
Shanghai Airlines	Shanghai–Hongqiao
Shenzhen Airlines	Chengdu–Tianfu, Harbin, Lanzhou, Nanning, Quanzhou, Shenyang, Shenzhen, Taiyuan, Yuncheng
Sichuan Airlines	Chengdu–Shuangliu, Chengdu–Tianfu, Chongqing, Harbin, Nanning, Shennongjia
Spring Airlines	Jieyang, Shenzhen, Wuhai
Suparna Airlines	Qingdao
Thai AirAsia	Bangkok–Don Mueang
Tianjin Airlines	Beihai, Chifeng, Dalian, Haikou, Hailar, Nanning, Nantong, Tongliao, Ulanqab, Yulin (Shaanxi)
Tibet Airlines	Chengdu–Shuangliu, Lhasa, Mianyang
Trinity Airways	Seoul–Incheon
Urumqi Air	Ürümqi, Yinchuan, Zhanjiang
XiamenAir	Ankang, Chongqing, Dalian, Fuzhou, Hangzhou, Heze, Hohhot, Jakarta–Soekarno-Hatta, Lanzhou, Luzhou, Mianyang, Nanchong, Quanzhou, Shenyang, Tianjin, Ürümqi, Xiamen, Xiangyang, Xining, Yinchuan

=== Cargo ===
Airlines	Destinations
Aeroméxico Cargo	Mexico City
China Postal Airlines	Nanjing
Emirates SkyCargo	Dubai–Al Maktoum
Kalitta Air	Anchorage, Chicago–O'Hare
SF Airlines	Frankfurt, Hangzhou, Hanoi, Hong Kong, Osaka–Kansai, Shenzhen, Tokyo–Narita, Zhengzhou
Yangtze River Express	Guangzhou, Hangzhou, Shenzhen

== Gallery ==
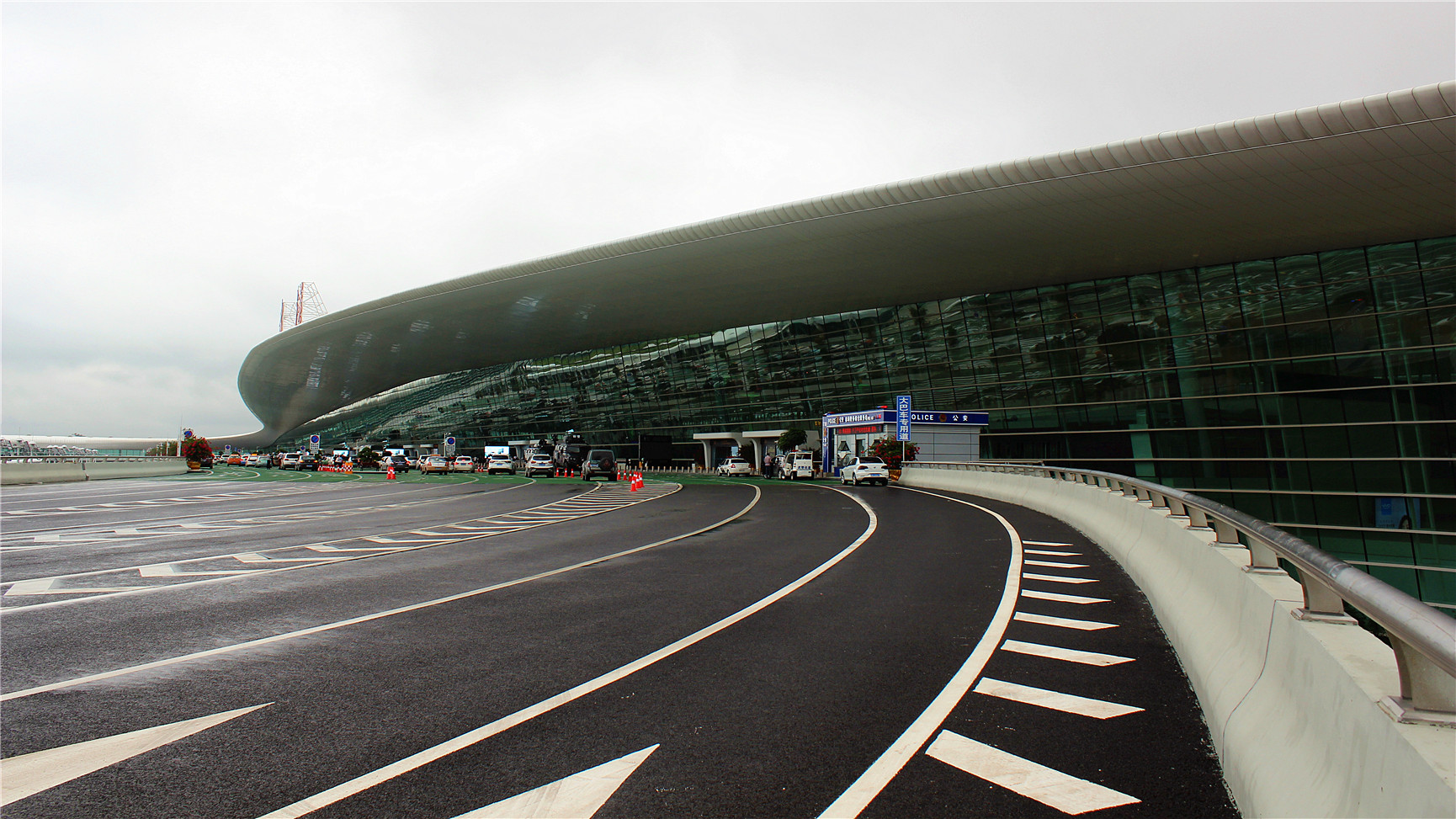
Departures drop-off lanes

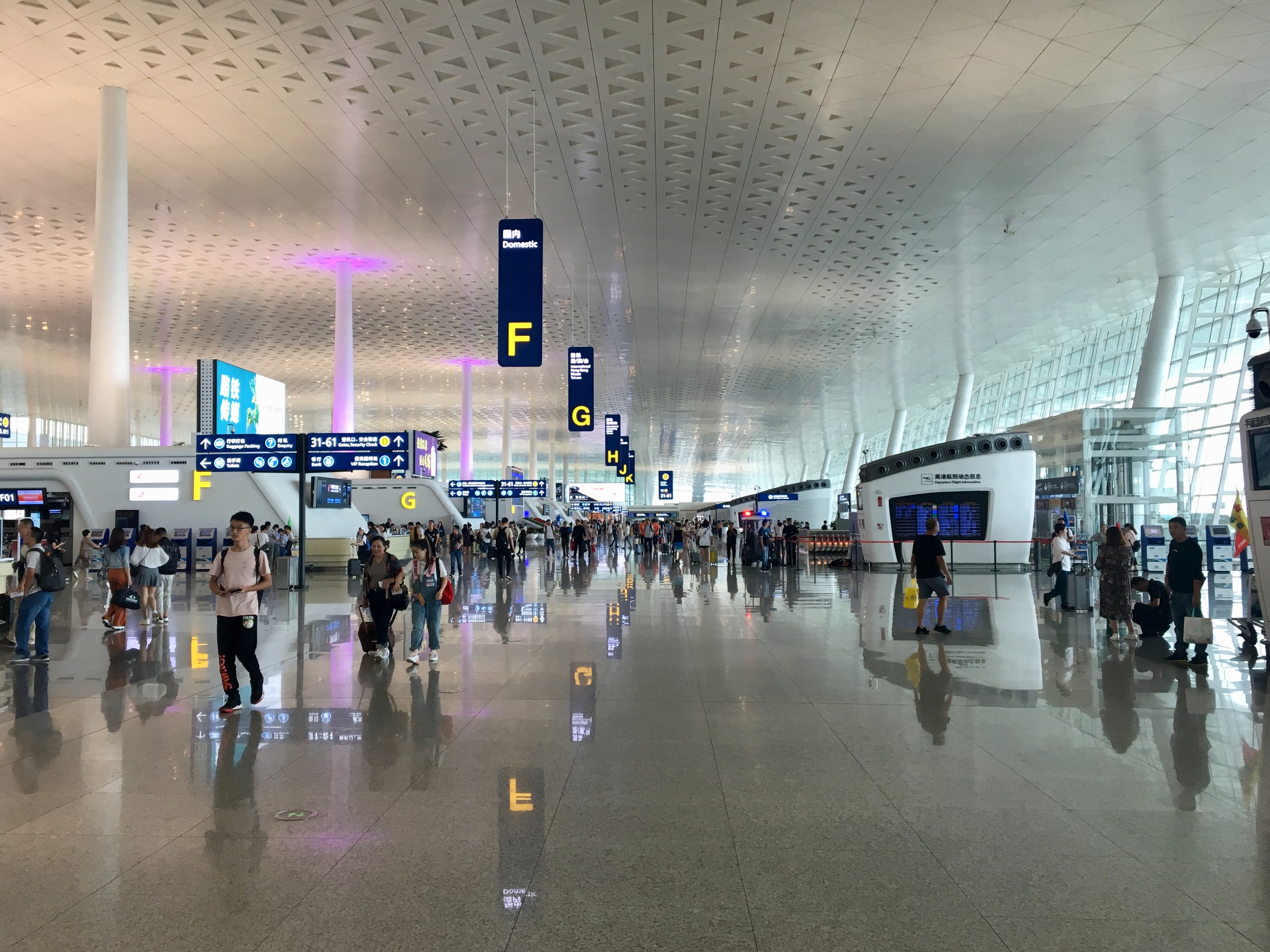
Check-in hall

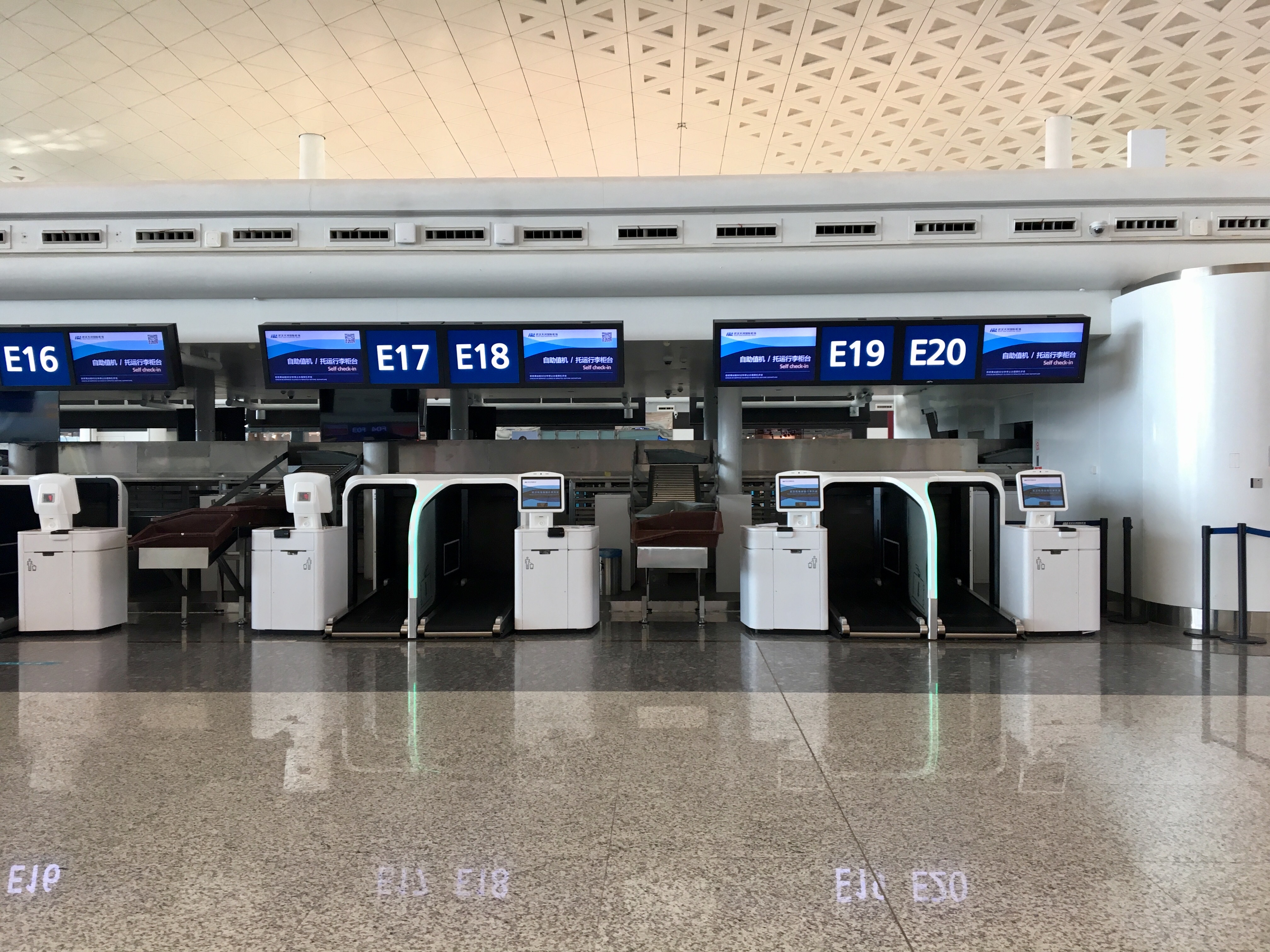
Baggage Drop kiosks at self check-in counters

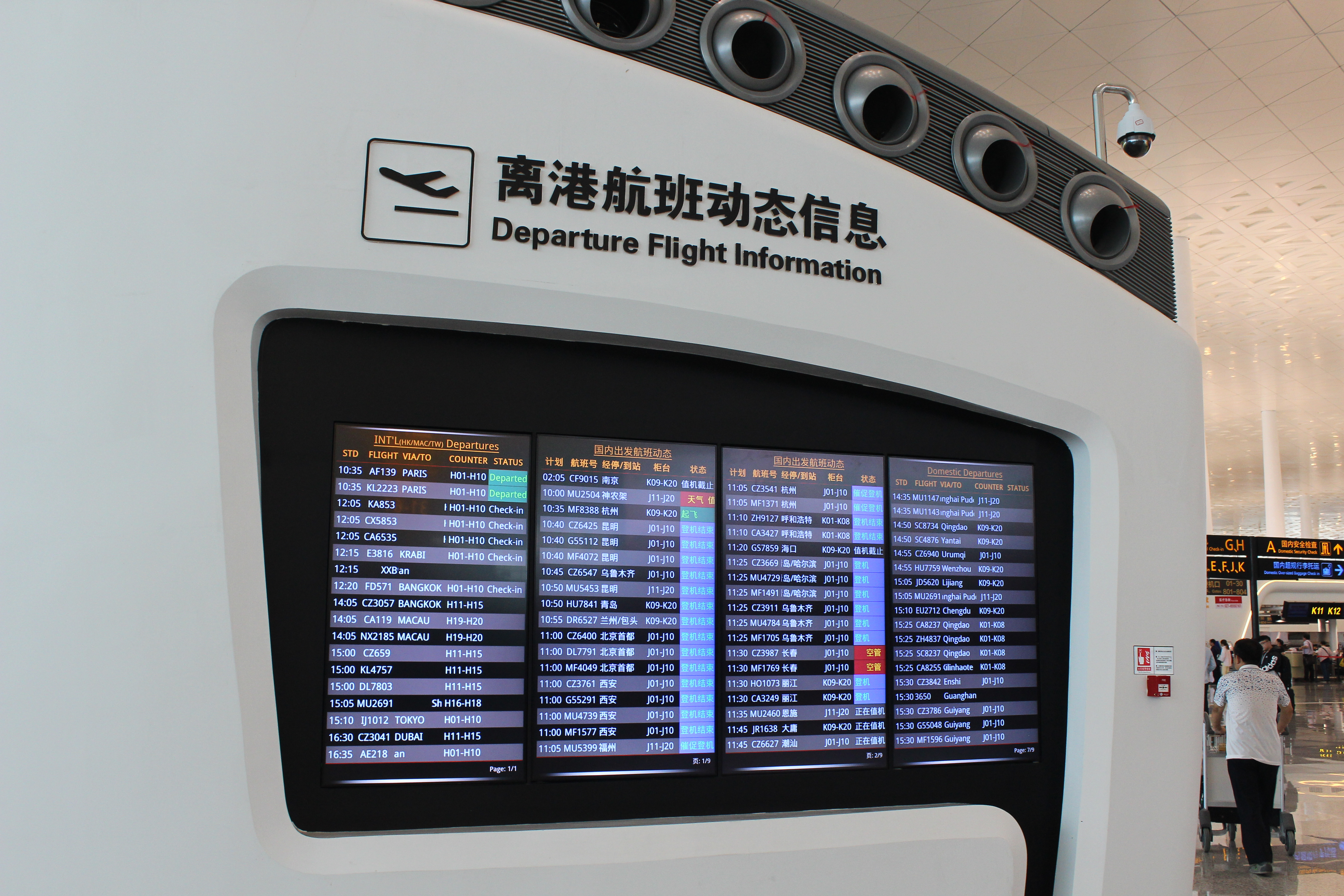
Info panel for departing flights

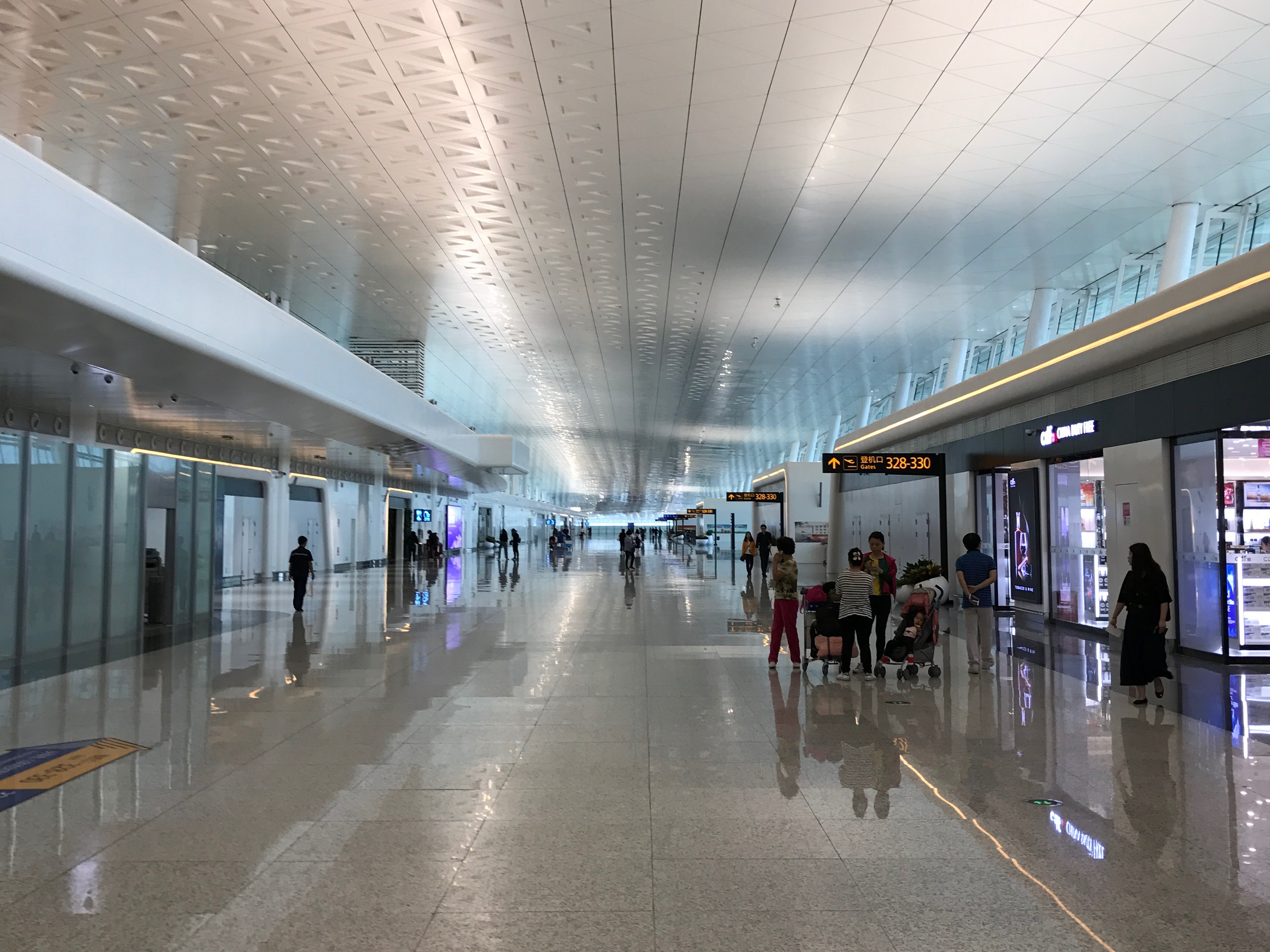
International departure hall

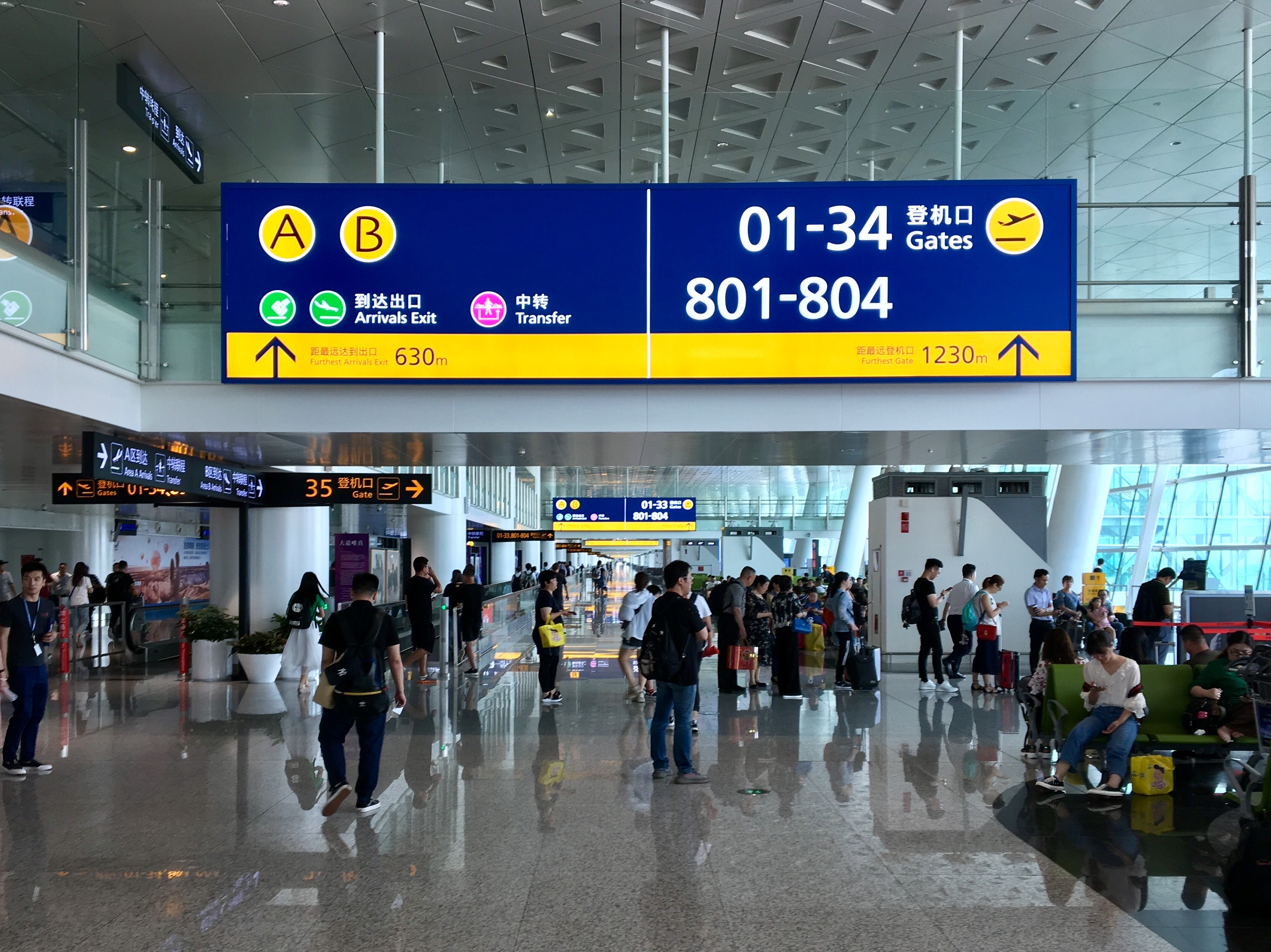
Central gates

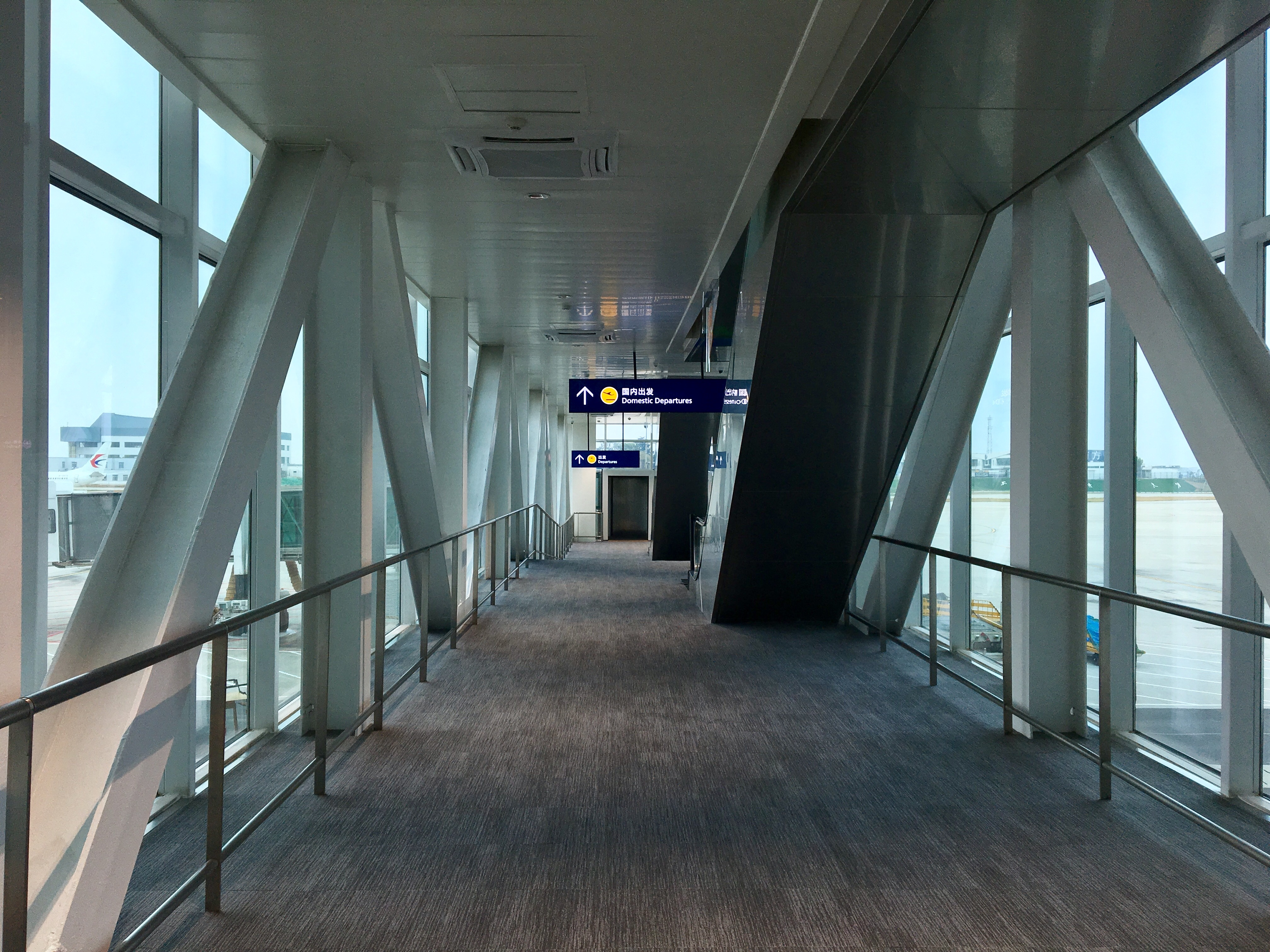
Inside of jet bridge

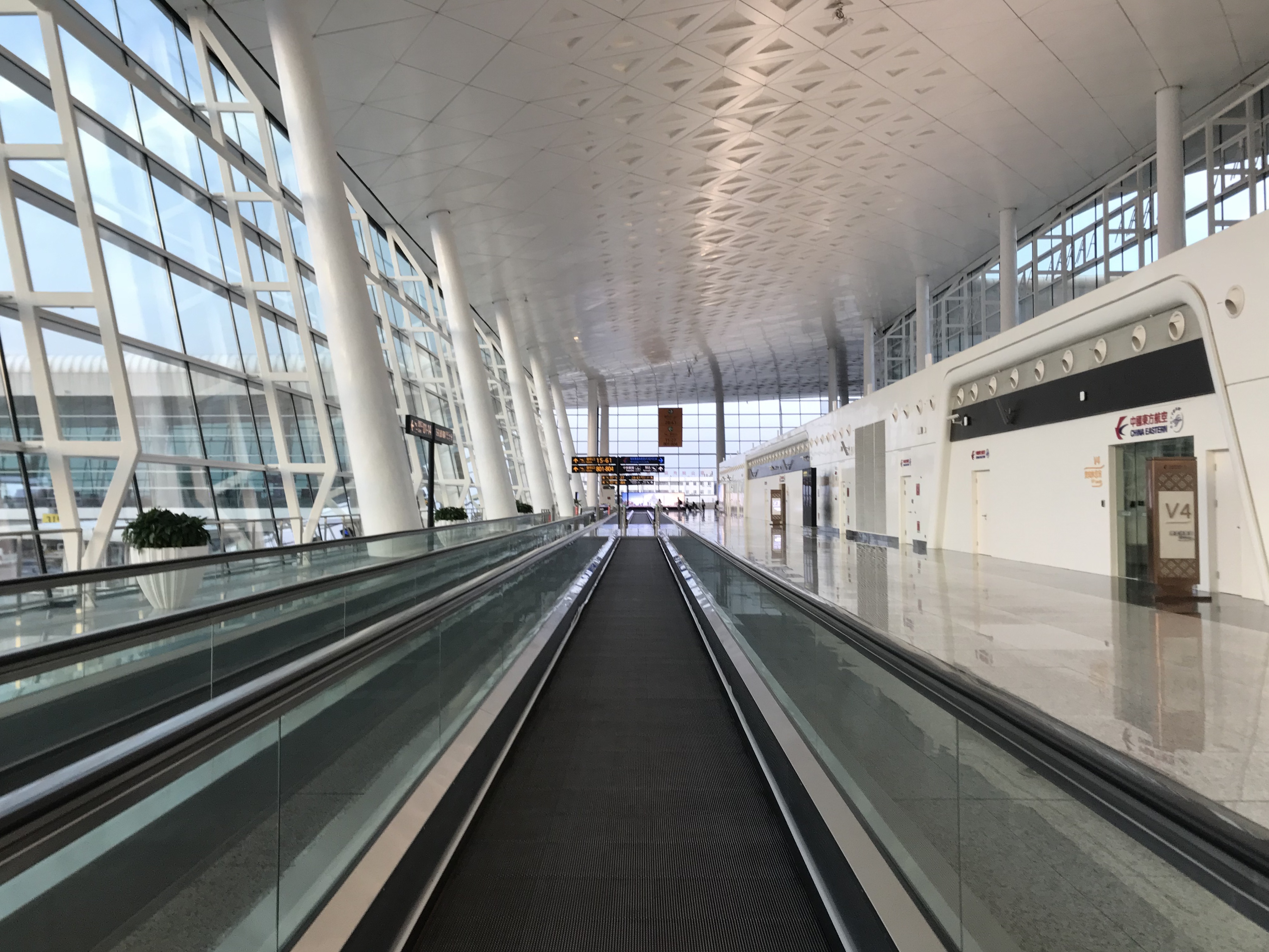
Moving walkway

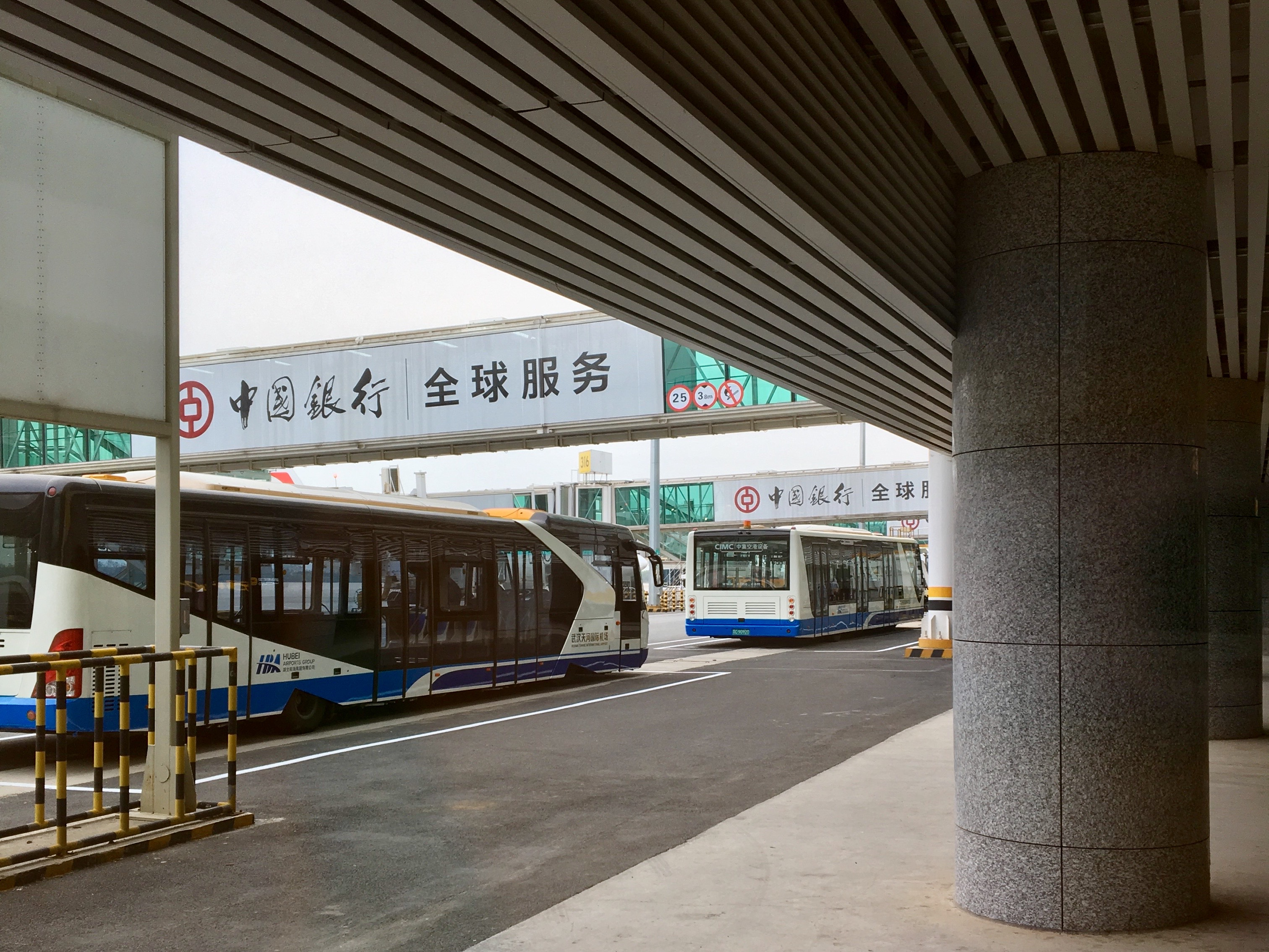
Shuttle buses for remote gates

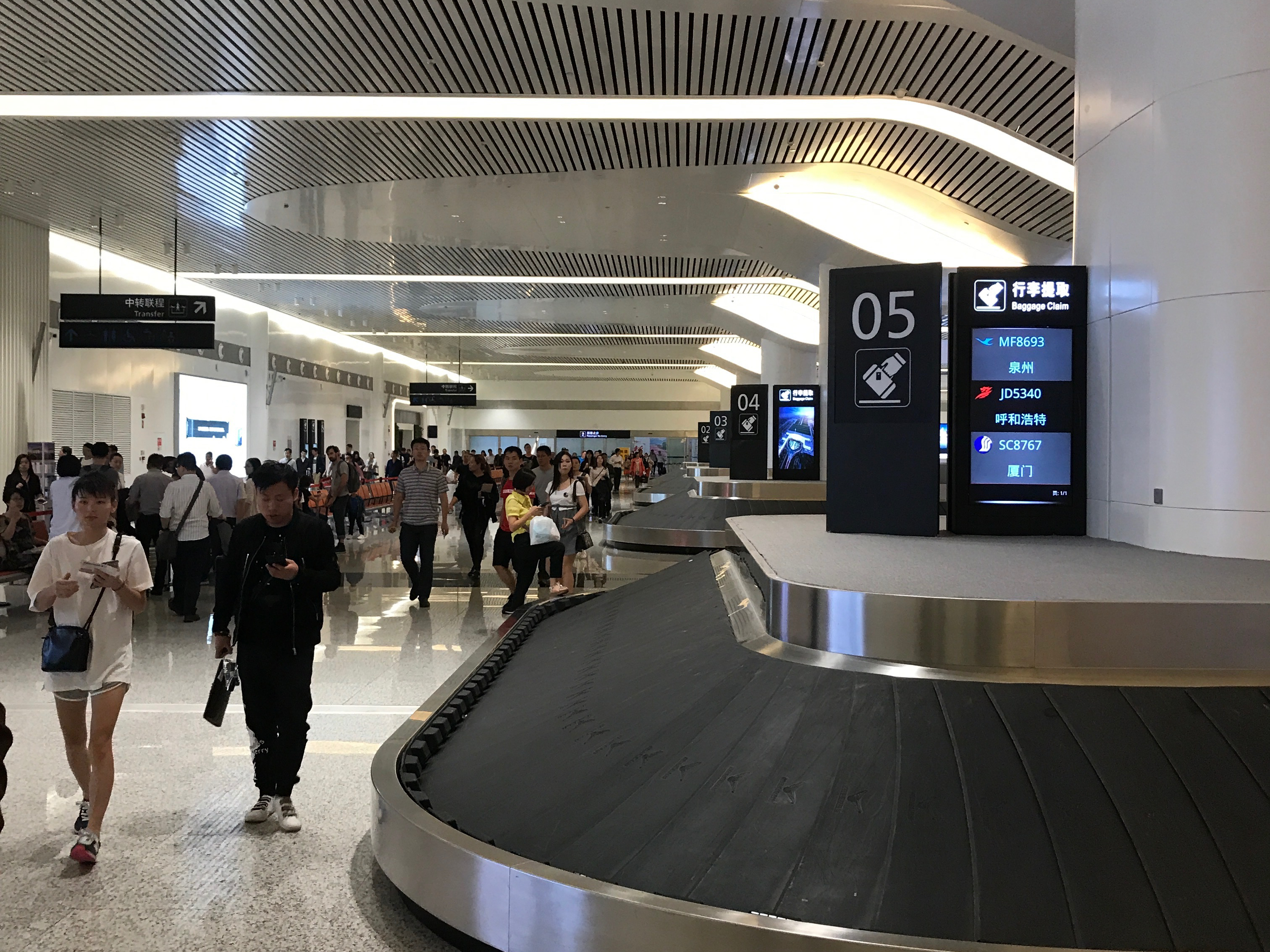
Baggage claim

== Transportation ==
=== Roads ===
Two tolled expressways, the S18 Wuhan Airport Expressway and the S19 Wuhan Airport 2nd Expressway, connect the airport to downtown Hankou.

=== Public transport ===
There is a limited bus service between Wuhan Tianhe Airport and several bus stops in the urban area of Wuhan.

The Wuhan–Xiaogan intercity railway, one of the lines of the Wuhan Metropolitan Area intercity railway, serves Wuhan Tianhe Airport. This railway opened in December 2016.

The extension of Line 2 of Wuhan Metro to Tianhe International Airport station opened on 28 December 2016.
