= Wuxu, Nanning =

Wuxu 吴圩镇
- Town
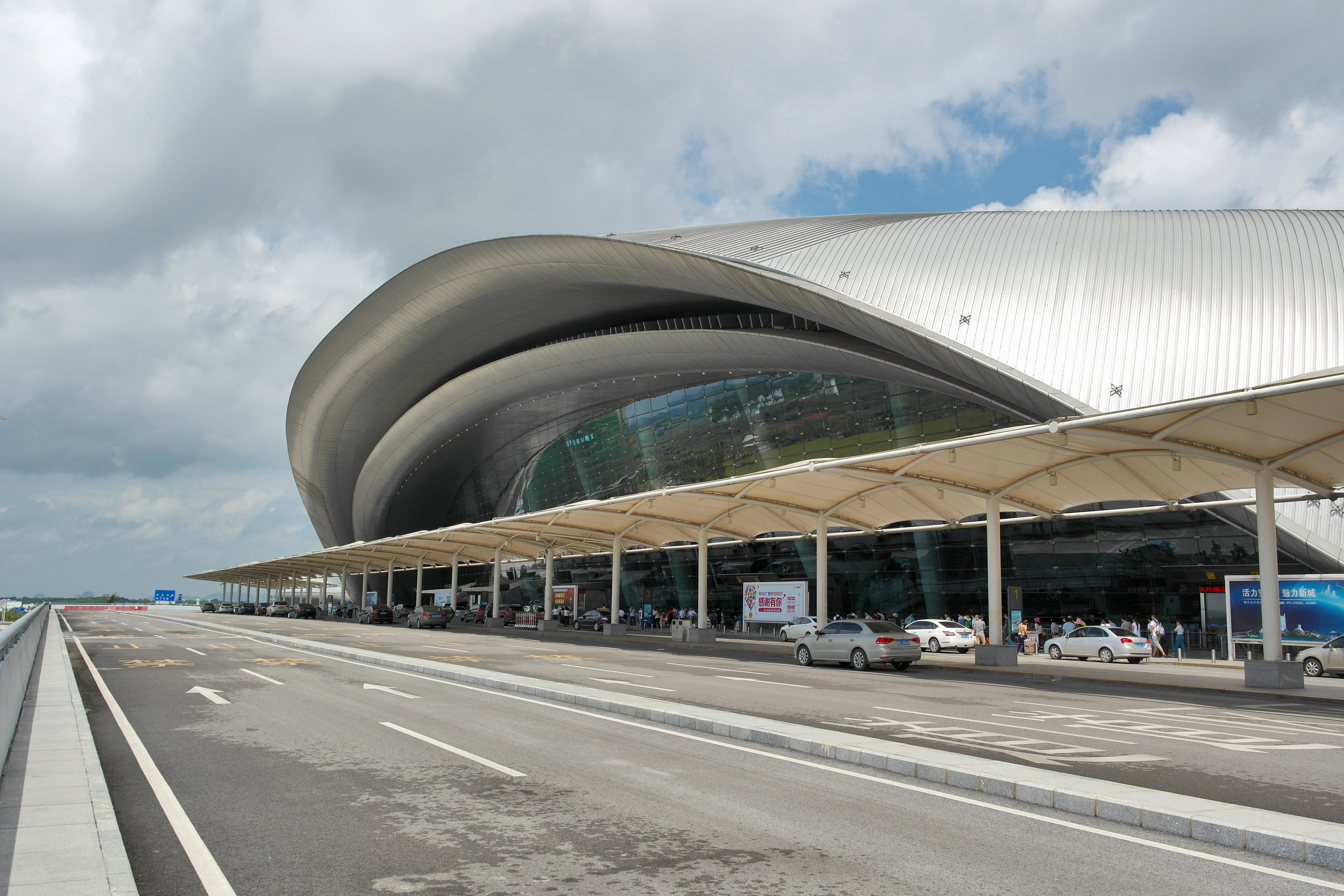
- Terminal 2 of Nanning Wuxu International Airport

- Location in Guangxi
- Coordinates: 22°38′57″N 108°13′13″E
- Country: People's Republic of China
- Autonomous region: Guangxi
- Prefecture-level city: Nanning
- District: Jiangnan District
- Time zone: UTC+8 (China Standard)

Wuxu (simplified Chinese: 吴圩; traditional Chinese: 吳圩; pinyin: Wúxū) is a town in Jiangnan District, Nanning, Guangxi. It is best known for the Nanning Wuxu International Airport which is located within the town's limits. As of 2020, it administers the following three residential communities and ten villages:

- Wuxu Community
- Mingyang Community (明阳社区)
- Minghong Community (明弘社区)
- Pingdong Village (平垌村)
- Pingdan Village (平丹村)
- Nade Village (那德村)
- Dingning Village (定宁村)
- Kangning Village (康宁村)
- Xiangning Village (祥宁村)
- Yonghong Village (永红村)
- Tanbai Village (坛白村)
- Nabei Village (那备村)
- Xinqiao Village (新桥村)
