= Jiangnan, Nanning =

Jiangnan 江南区 · Gyanghnanz Gih
- District
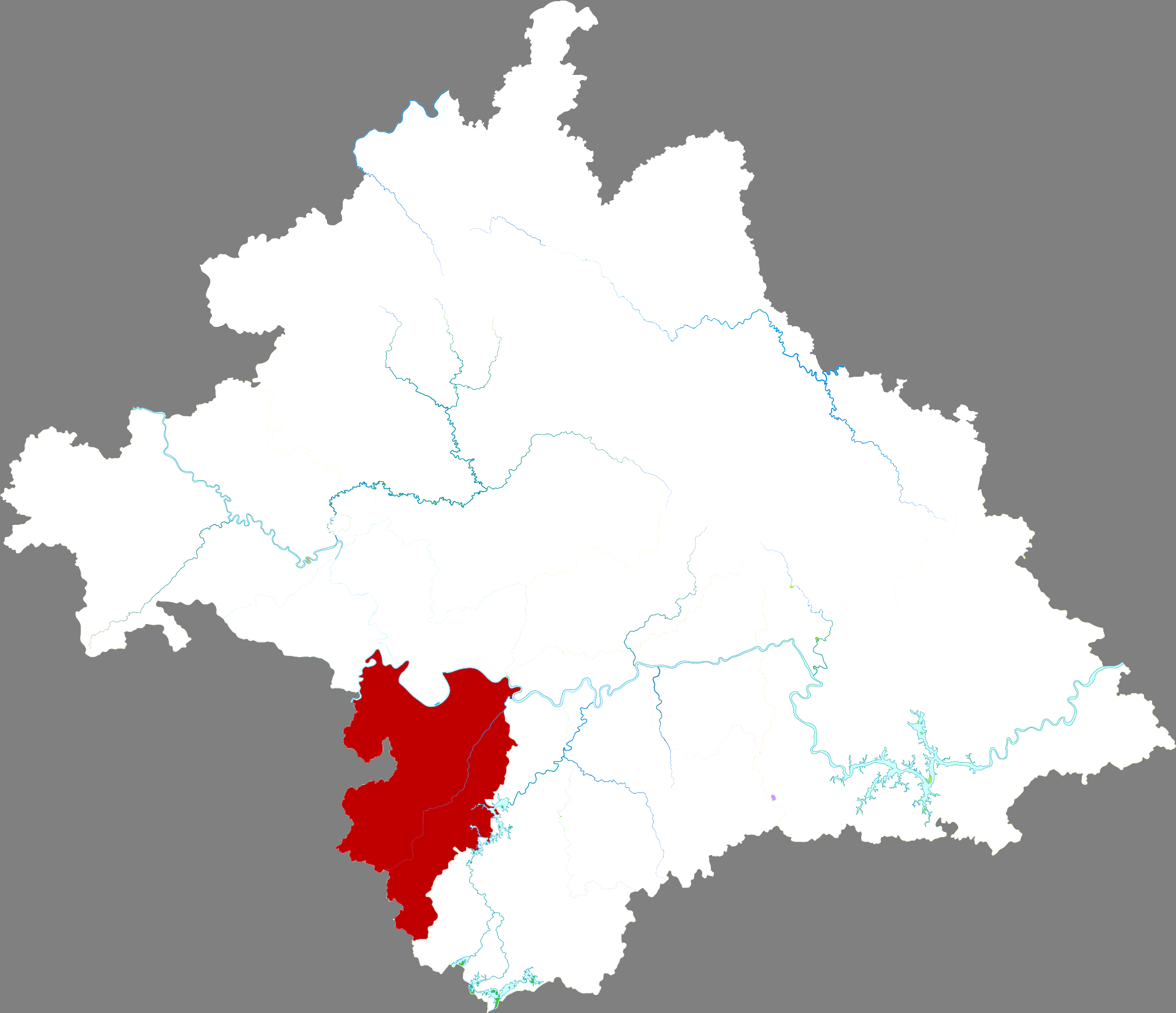
- Location in Nanning

- Location in Guangxi
- Coordinates: 22°48′02″N 108°16′40″E
- Country: China
- Autonomous region: Guangxi
- Prefecture-level city: Nanning
- Subdivisions: 5 subdistricts 4 towns
- District seat: Jiangnan Subdistrict

Area
  - Total: 1,298 km^{2} (501 sq mi)

Population (2020)
  - Total: 542,100
  - Density: 417.6/km^{2} (1,082/sq mi)
- Time zone: UTC+8 (China Standard)
- Website: jnq.nanning.gov.cn

Jiangnan District (simplified Chinese: 江南区; traditional Chinese: 江南區; pinyin: Jiāngnán Qū; Standard Zhuang: Gyanghnanz Gih) is one of seven districts of the prefecture-level city of Nanning, the capital of Guangxi Zhuang Autonomous Region, South China.

== Administrative divisions ==
There are 5 subdistricts and 4 towns in the district:

Subdistricts:

- Jiangnan Subdistrict (江南街道), Fujianyuan Subdistrict (福建园街道), Shajing Subdistrict (沙井街道), Nahong Subdistrict (那洪街道), Jinkai Subdistrict (金凯街道)

Towns:

- Jiangxi (江西镇), Wuxu (吴圩镇), Suxu (苏圩镇), Yan'an (延安镇)
