= Yangmei Ancient Town =

Village in Nanning, Guangxi, China

Coordinates: 22.844°N 108.0615°E

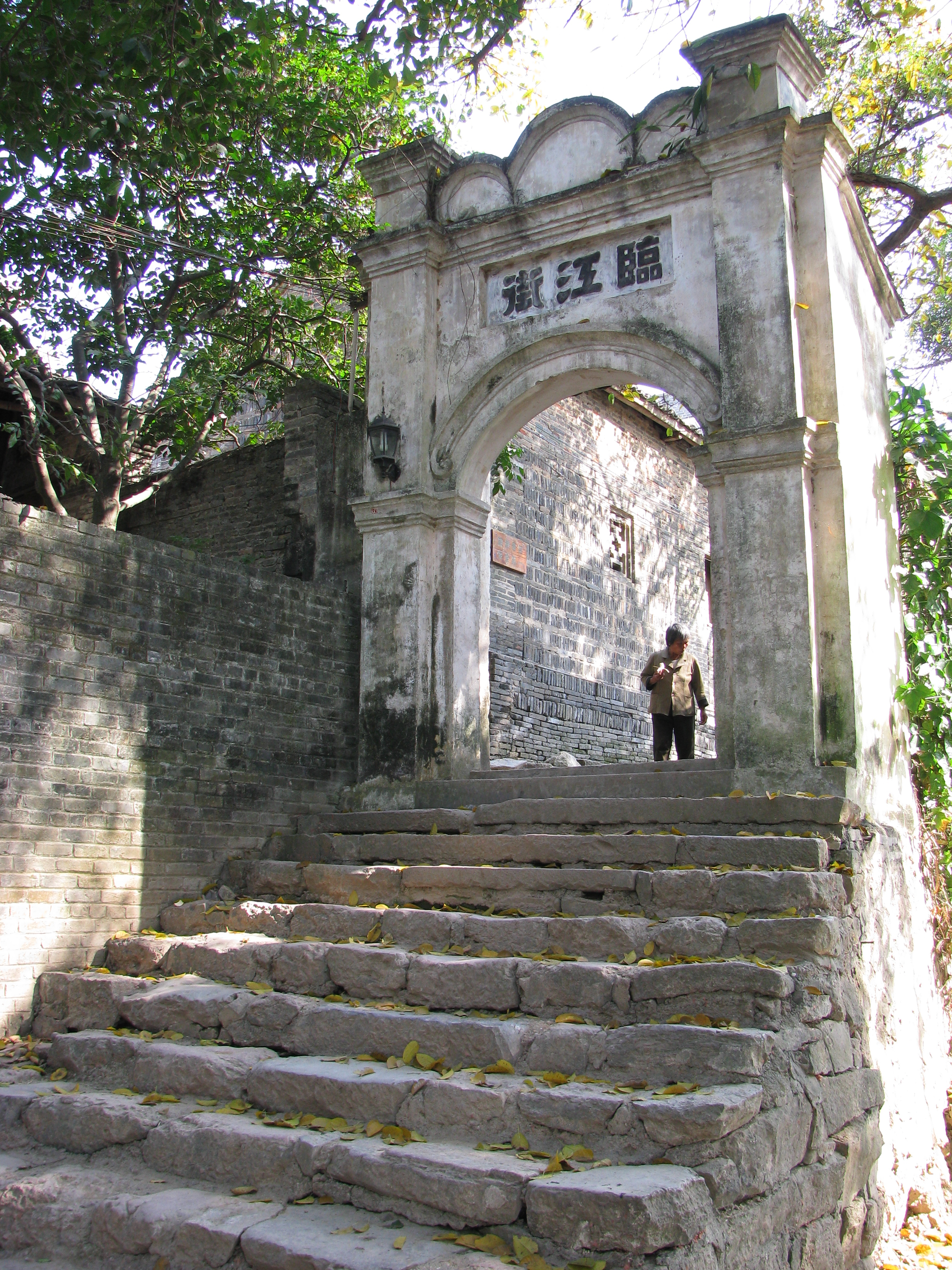
One of the old gates on the river side of the city wall in Yangmei

Yangmei Ancient Town (Chinese: 杨美古镇; pinyin: Yángméi Gǔ Zhèn) is a traditional town located on the Yong River in Nanning, Guangxi, China. The town's population is approximately 5,300.

It contains a great deal of architecture from China's dynastic past (particularly the Ming Dynasty) and is a popular tourist destination. It is located about 30 km west of Nanning.
