= List of defunct airports in China =

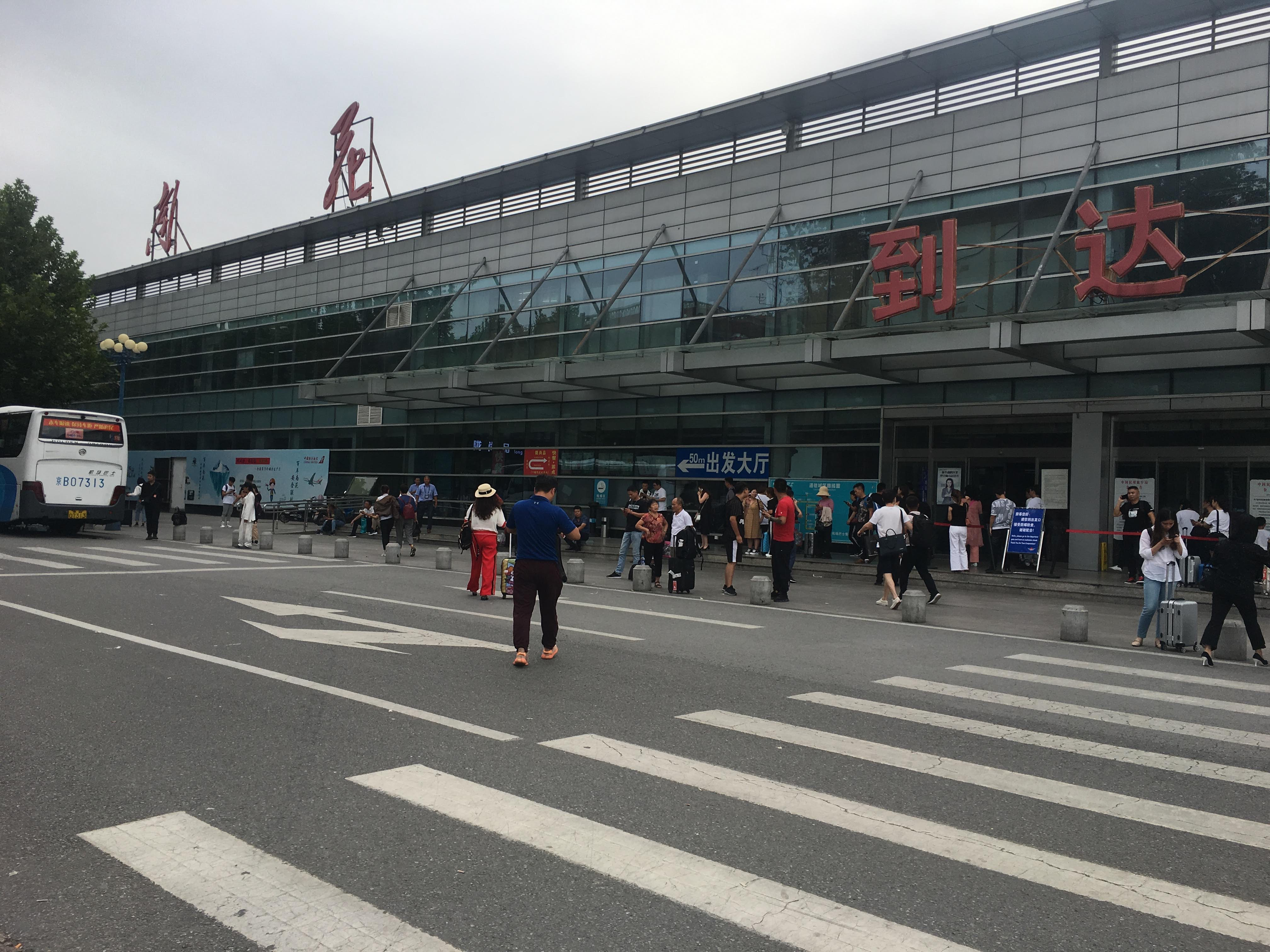
Beijing Nanyuan Airport was China's oldest airport, operating between 1910 and 2019, before having all civil operations transferred to the newly built Beijing Daxing International Airport.

In recent decades, China has experienced a drastic increase in demand for civil flight operations, becoming the fastest-growing passenger air market in the world. As a result, many of China's existing airport infrastructures were not sufficient to cope with the increased demands. As a result, larger and modern new airports are being constantly built to cope with the increased demand. As more modern airports are built, many existing airports are shut down for civilian use; however, many still operate as military airbases or for other purposes.

The following is a list of former civil airports in China. The opening and closing dates refer to the time during which civil operations were present. Some airports may have been operating for non-civil use outside these dates. For example, Shenyang Dongta Airport was established in April 1921; however, civilian operations did not commence until 1950.

== Civil airports ==
City served	ICAO	IATA	Airport name	Date opened	Date closed	Notes
Anhui
Hefei	HFE	ZSQF	Hefei Luogang Airport	November 1977	29 May 2013	
Hefei	Unknown	Unknown	Hefei Sanlijie Airport	1 January 1957	November 1977	
Wuhu	WHU	ZSWU	Wuhu Wanli Airport	Unknown	30 April 2021	Currently operates as a military base.
Beijing
Beijing	ZBNY	NAY	Beijing Nanyuan Airport	1910	25 September 2019	
Chongqing
Chongqing	Unknown	Unknown	Chongqing Baishiyi Airport	1936	22 January 1990	Currently operates as a military base.
Chongqing	Unknown	Unknown	Chongqing Guangyangba Airport	Unknown	Unknown	
Chongqing	LIA	ZULP	Liangping Airport	14 July 1988	25 May 2003	
Gansu
Lanzhou	LHW	ZLLL	Gongxingdun Airport	1932	16 July 1970	
Guangdong
Guangzhou	CAN	ZGGG	Guangzhou Baiyun International Airport (1933–2004)	1933	5 August 2004	
Shantou	SWA	ZGOW	Shantou Waisha Airport	15 April 1974	15 December 2011	Currently operates as a military base.
Zhanjiang	ZHA	ZGZJ	Zhanjiang Airport	1952	24 March 2022	
Guangxi
Guilin	KWL	ZGKL	Guilin Qifengling Airport	1958	1 October 1996	Currently operates as a military base.
Wuzhou	WUZ	ZGWZ	Wuzhou Changzhoudao Airport	July 1995	23 January 2019	
Hainan
Haikou	HAK	ZGHK	Haikou Dayingshan Airport	1934	25 May 1999	
Hebei
Qinhuangdao	SHP	ZBSH	Qinhuangdao Shanhaiguan Airport	15 April 1985	31 March 2016	Currently operates as a military base.
Henan
Anyang	AYN	ZHAY	Anyang Airport	1955	Unknown	
Zhengzhou	CGO	ZHCC	Zhengzhou Dongjiao Airport	1 August 1956	28 August 1997	
Hong Kong
Hong Kong	HKG	VHHH	Kai Tak Airport	25 January 1925	6 July 1998	
Hubei
Jingzhou	SHS	ZHSS	Shashi Airport	1929	7 May 2002	
Hunan
Changsha	CSX	ZGCS	Changsha Datuopu Airport	1957	29 August 1989	Currently operates as a military air base.
Hengyang	HNY	ZGHY	Hengyang Bajialing Airport	1955	November 1995	
Inner Mongolia
Xilinhot	Unknown	Unknown	Xilinhot Airport (former)	1 October 1958	22 July 1992	
Jiangsu
Lianyungang	LYG	ZSLG	Lianyungang Baitabu Airport	26 March 1985	2 December 2021	Currently operates as a military base.
Suzhou	SZV	ZSSZ	Suzhou Guangfu Airport	February 1994	29 October 2002	Currently operates as a military base.
Nanjing	NKG	Z08T	Nanjing Dajiaochang Airport	13 November 1959	25 March 2008	Operated as a military base until 2015.
Xuzhou	Unknown	Unknown	Xuzhou Daguozhuang Airport	Unknown	8 November 1997	
Jiangxi
Ganzhou	KOW	ZSCZ	Ganzhou Huangjin Airport (former)	13 November 1959	25 March 2008	
Nanchang	Unknown	Unknown	Nanchang Laoyingfang Airport	May 1948	1949	
Nanchang	KHN	none	Nanchang Xiangtang Airport	1 January 1957	10 September 1999	Currently operates as a military base.
Jilin
Changchun	CGQ	ZYCC	Changchun Dafangshen Airport	October 1960	27 August 2005	Currently operates as a military air base.
Jilin City	JIL	ZYJL	Jilin Ertaizi Airport	1 April 1991	3 October 2005	Currently operates as a military air base; to be reopened for civil use.
Liaoning
Jinzhou	JNZ	ZYJZ	Jinzhou Xiaolingzi Airport	1993	10 December 2015	Currently operates as a military base.
Shenyang	SHE	ZYYY	Shenyang Dongta Airport	1950	16 April 1989	
Qinghai
Xining	Unknown	Unknown	Lejiawan Airport	1931	27 December 1991	Currently operates as a military base.
Shaanxi
Ankang	AKA	ZLAK	Ankang Wulipu Airport	1938	24 September 2020	
Hanzhong	HZG	ZLHZ	Hanzhong Xiguan Airport	1937	13 August 2014	
Xi'an	SIA	ZLSN	Xi'an Xiguan Airport	1924	1 September 1991	
Yan'an	Unknown	Unknown	Yan'an Dongguan Airport	1 October 1958	1980	
Yan'an	ENY	ZLYA	Yan'an Ershilipu Airport	1980	8 November 2018	
Yulin	UYN	ZLYL	Yulin Xisha Airport	1988	March 2008	
Shandong
Jinan	Unknown	Unknown	Jinan Zhangzhuang Airport	Unknown	26 July 1992	
Jining	JNG	ZSJG	Jining Qufu Airport	28 December 2008	28 December 2023	
Qingdao	TAO	ZSQD	Qingdao Liuting International Airport	5 August 1982	12 August 2021	
Yantai	YNT	ZSYT	Yantai Laishan Airport	8 October 1984	28 May 2015	
Shanghai
Shanghai	Unknown	ZSSL	Shanghai Longhua Airport	1922	1966	Currently a heliport.
Shanghai	Unknown	Unknown	Shanghai Jiangwan Airport	1939	1994	
Shanxi
Huairen	Unknown	Unknown	Shuozhou Huairen Airport	Unknown	2006	Currently operates as a military base.
Taiyuan	Unknown	Unknown	Taiyuan Chengbei Airport	May 1934	1951	
Taiyuan	Unknown	Unknown	Taiyuan Qinxian Airport	October 1950	1975	
Sichuan
Dazhou	DAX	ZUDX	Dazhou Heshi Airport	1940	18 May 2022	Currently operates a general aviation airport.
Luzhou	LZO	ZULZ	Luzhou Lantian Airport	1945	10 September 2018	
Yibin	YBP	ZUYB	Yibin Caiba Airport	16 December 1992	4 December 2019	Currently operates as a military base.
Xinjiang
Kuqa	Unknown	Unknown	Kuqa Airport	1939	14 September 1998	
Qiemo	IQM	ZWCM	Qiemo Airport	1979	May 2011	
Yunnan
Kunming	KMG	ZPPP	Kunming Wujiaba International Airport	1923	28 June 2012	
Zhejiang
Hangzhou	HGH	ZSHC	Hangzhou Jianqiao Airport	1 January 1957	29 December 2000	Currently operates as a military base.
