= HNY =

HNY may refer to:

- Happy New Year (2014 film)
- Hengyang Nanyue Airport, IATA code HNY
- Hengyang Bajialing Airport, former IATA code HNY
- Hny (trigraph)

== See also ==
- Happy New Year (disambiguation)
