= Hengyang Nanyue Airport =

Hengyang Nanyue Airport 衡阳南岳机场
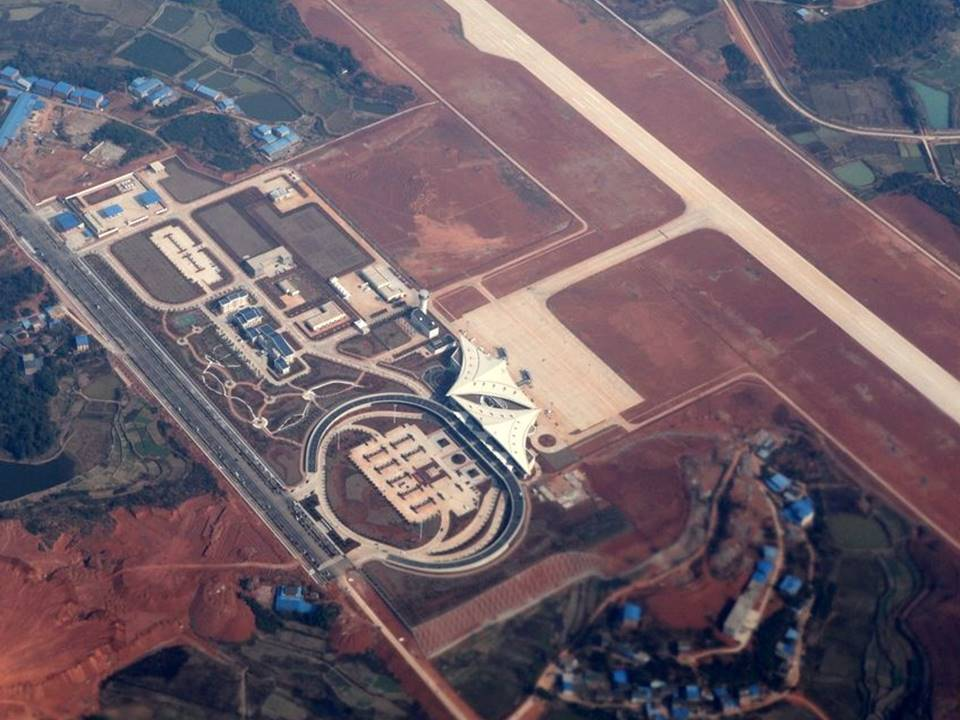
- IATA: HNY; ICAO: ZGHY

Summary
- Airport type: Public
- Serves: Hengyang, Hunan, China
- Location: Yunji Town, Hengnan County
- Opened: 23 December 2014
- Coordinates: 26°43′26″N 112°37′6″E

Map
- Location of airport in Hunan

Runways
Direction	Length		Surface
Direction	m	ft	Surface
04/22	2,600	8,530	Concrete

Statistics (2025)
- Passengers: 1,145,286 ▲10.1%
- Aircraft movements: 10,902 ▲7.7%
- Cargo (metric tons): 260.7 ▼24.0%
- Source:CAAC

Hengyang Nanyue Airport
- Simplified Chinese: 衡阳南岳机场
- Traditional Chinese: 衡陽南嶽機場
Transcriptions
Standard Mandarin
- Hanyu Pinyin: Héngyáng Nányuè Jīchǎng

Hengyang Nanyue Airport (IATA: HNY, ICAO: ZGHY) is an airport serving the city of Hengyang in Hunan province, China. Located in Yunji Town, Hengnan County, the airport is named after Mount Heng, also known as Nanyue. It replaced the old Bajialing Airport, which was shut down in 1995. Construction of the airport started on 7 January 2012 with a total investment of 656 million yuan, and the airport was opened on 23 December 2014, with an inaugural flight from Beijing Nanyuan Airport.

== History ==
Hengyang Nanyue Airport began site selection in 2008 and received approval documents from the Civil Aviation Administration of China in January 2009. Hengyang Nanyue Airport covered an area of 2,247 acres and involved 26 villager groups in the four villages of Dongwu, Puxian, Shanfeng and Gutang in Yunji Town, Hengnan County.

In December 2010, it received project approval from the State Council and the Central Military Commission. In 2011, the state implemented macro-control and controlled the approval of new investment projects, and the project was temporarily shelved. On February 22, 2012, the feasibility study report of Nanyue Airport was approved by the National Development and Reform Commission, and construction can officially begin.

On May 30, 2012, Hengyang Nanyue Airport held its official ground‑breaking ceremony, marking the start of a major infrastructure project included in China’s national Twelfth Five‑Year Plan. With a total investment of 656.17 million yuan, the airport was designed as a domestic regional facility built to Class 4C flight area standards, with the capacity to upgrade to Class 4D. The newly-built runway is 2,600 meters long and 45 meters wide, with a taxiway of 160.5‑meter long and 18‑meter‑wide, an apron of 31,000 square meters, a terminal building of 14,300 square meters and 5 parking spaces, which can guarantee the take-off and landing of Airbus 320, Boeing 738 and below models. The project was scheduled for a two‑year construction period, with the airport expected to open to air traffic in early 2014.

On December 23, 2014, a Boeing 737 passenger plane flew from Beijing Nanyuan Airport to Hengyang Nanyue Airport in Hunan, marking the official opening of Hengyang Nanyue Airport in Hunan. Hunan Hengyang Nanyue Civil Airport was planned and constructed in accordance with domestic regional airport standard. The designed annual passenger throughput was 450,000, and the designed freight throughput was 1,600 tons. At the opening ceremony, Yang Xinguo, deputy director of the Central and Southern Bureau, issued a civil transport airport license to Hengyang Nanyue Airport.

In 2017, the passenger throughput was 479,000. In 2018, passenger throughput reached 816,000, far exceeding the original design capacity of 450,000 passengers. In 2019, Hengyang's aviation market far exceeded development expectations. The airport reconstruction and expansion originally planned to be implemented in 2025 started early that year and was officially put into use in 2021. After the reconstruction and expansion, the parking spaces will be increased to 11, the fire protection and medical rescue protection levels will be upgraded to level 7 and level 6 respectively, and the annual passenger throughput will be increased to 2 million.

== Facilities ==
The airport has a runway that is 2,600 metres (8,500 ft) long and 45 metres (148 ft) wide (class 4C), capable of handling Boeing 737 and Airbus A320 aircraft, and a 14,300-square-metre (154,000 ft^{2}) terminal building with 3 aerobridges, and five aircraft parking places. It is projected to serve 360,000 passengers annually by 2020.

== Airlines and destinations ==
Airlines	Destinations
9 Air	Xishuangbanna
Air China	Beijing–Capital, Chengdu–Tianfu
China Eastern Airlines	Qingdao
GX Airlines	Jinan
Hainan Airlines	Haikou
Juneyao Air	Lijiang, Wenzhou
Shanghai Airlines	Kunming, Shanghai–Pudong
Spring Airlines	Shanghai–Hongqiao
Tianjin Airlines	Chongqing, Guiyang, Haikou, Hangzhou, Nanjing, Sanya, Tianjin, Xi'an
XiamenAir	Lanzhou, Xiamen

== See also ==
- List of airports in China
- List of the busiest airports in China
