= Taiyuan Wusu International Airport =

Airport serving Taiyuan, Shanxi, China

Taiyuan Wusu International Airport 太原武宿国际机场
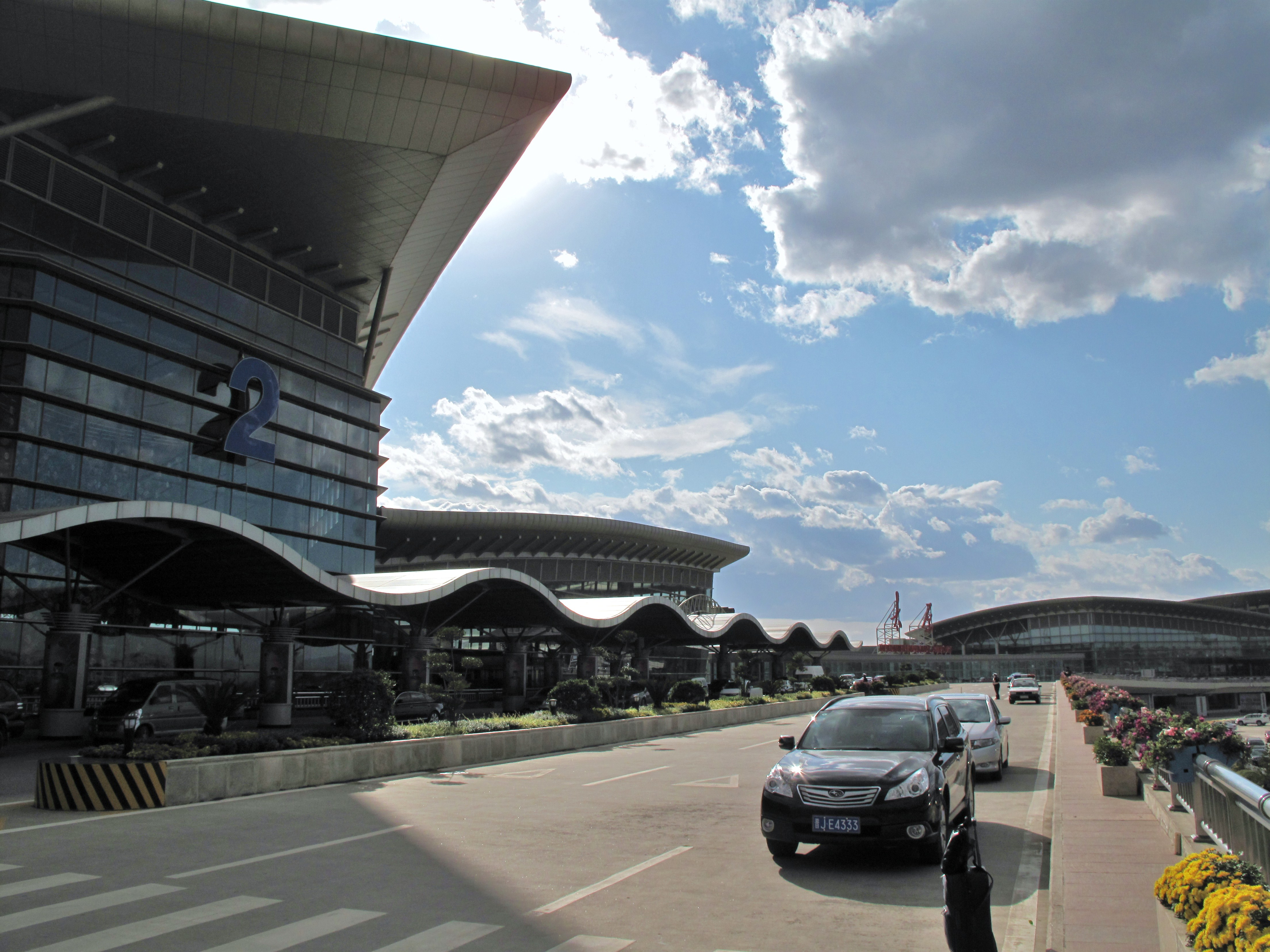
- IATA: TYN; ICAO: ZBYN

Summary
- Airport type: Public
- Serves: Taiyuan
- Location: Xiaodian, Taiyuan, Shanxi, China
- Opened: July 1, 1971; 55 years ago
- Focus city for: China Eastern Airlines; Hainan Airlines
- Operating base for: West Air
- Elevation AMSL: 785 m (2,575 ft)
- Coordinates: 37°44′49″N 112°37′42″E

Maps
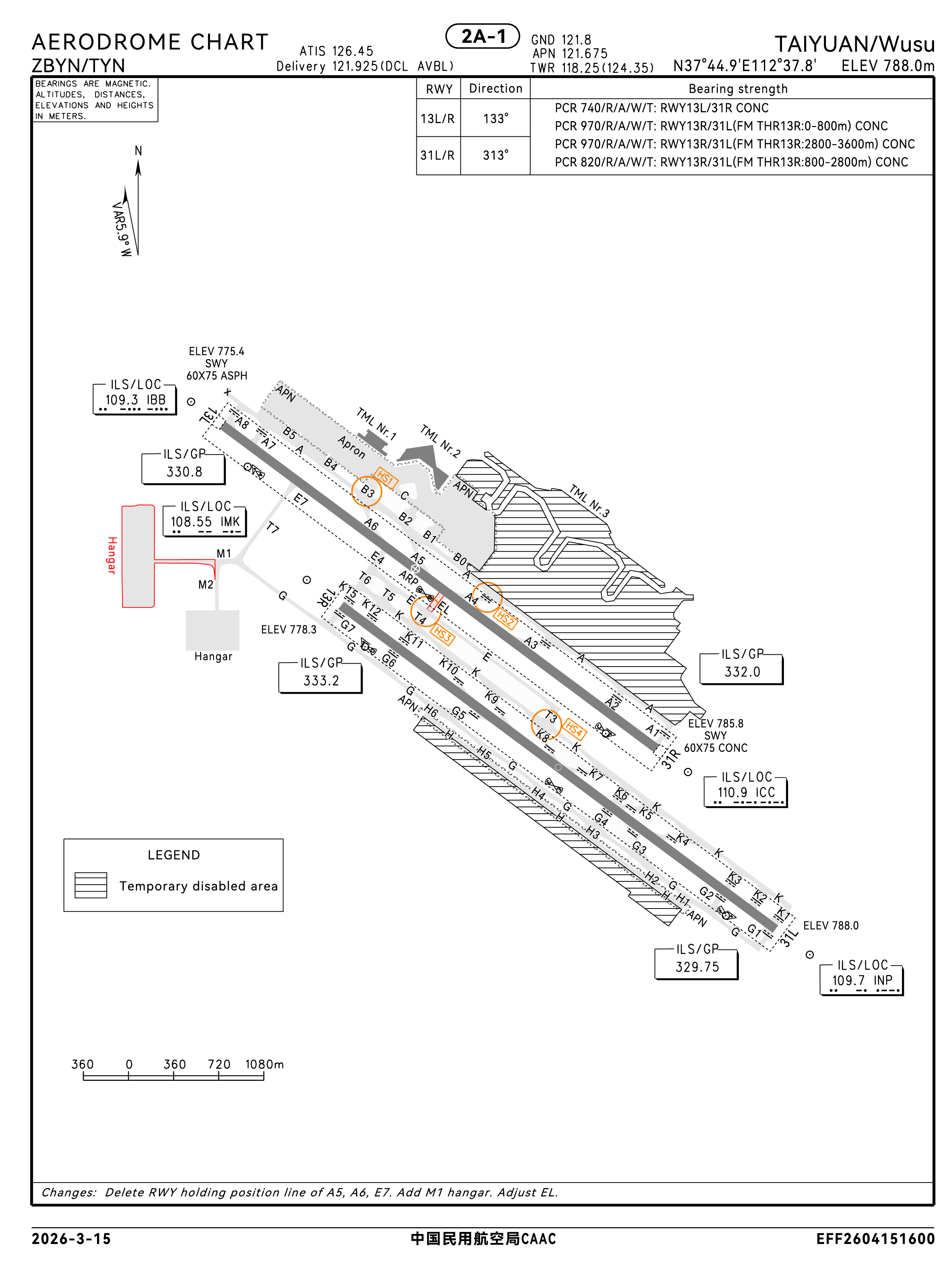
- CAAC airport chart

- Location in Shanxi Location in China

Runways
Direction	Length		Surface
Direction	m	ft	Surface
13L/31R	3,600	11,811	Concrete
13R/31L	3,600	11,811	Concrete

Statistics (2025)
- Passengers: 14,573,546
- Aircraft movements: 107,127
- Cargo (Metric tonnes): 76,464.4
- Source: List of the busiest airports in the People's Republic of China

Taiyuan Wusu International Airport
- Simplified Chinese: 太原武宿国际机场
- Traditional Chinese: 太原武宿國際機場
Transcriptions
Standard Mandarin
- Hanyu Pinyin: Tàiyuán Wǔsù Guójì Jīchǎng

Taiyuan Wusu International Airport (IATA: TYN, ICAO: ZBYN) is an international airport serving Taiyuan, the capital of North China's Shanxi province. It is the largest airport in Shanxi and is located about 15 kilometers (9.3 miles) southeast of downtown Taiyuan.

== History ==
On February 6, 1939 (the 28th year of the Republic), the Japanese military proposed establishing a civil airport between Taiyuan and Yuci, citing the need to "maintain public order in Shanxi Province and promote industrial development" (維持山西省之治安及產業開發). With the approval of Wang Yitang's (王揖唐) Provisional Government of the Republic of China, the Shanxi Provincial Government issued an airfield survey order to Liang Ruzhang (梁如璋), director of the Taiyuan Highway Engineering Bureau. In June 1939, construction of Wusu Airport began, named after the nearby Wusu Village. The construction project was undertaken by a team organized by the Japanese engineer Akishima Nobuo (秋島信雄).

In November 1939, the airport was opened to traffic, operated as a joint military-civilian airport. In March 1940 (the 29th year of the Republic), based on designs prepared by the Highway Division of the Taiyuan Highway Engineering Bureau, the existing southern section was extended northward toward Xinying Village. After leveling and compacting the ground, a north–south runway measuring 1,000 meters long and 80 meters wide was built, along with an east–west earthen taxiway 700 meters long and 30 meters wide. The earthen taxiway was later upgraded to a concrete surface.

On 11 August 1944, twenty Allied U.S. bombers arrived over Taiyuan and carried out air raids against Japanese military targets, including the Taiyuan airfield, barracks, and the arsenal. Thirteen Japanese aircraft were destroyed on the spot, and the arsenal was bombed to the point that production had to cease.

In 1945, operations were suspended, and the airport was repaired and reopened in November 1946. In 1948 during the Liberation of Taiyuan, the airport was captured by the People's Liberation Army. Following capture in October 1948, operations were suspended again, and the airport was converted for military use. Since December 1951, the city of Taiyuan was served by the nearby Taiyuan Qinxian Airport, which was equipped with a single concrete runway. On December 9, 1959, Wusu Airport was approved for allocation to civil aviation, however, implementation was shelved due to economic reasons. By the late 1960s, Qinxian Airport was unable to accommodate the region's growing needs, and ownership of Wusu Airport was transferred to the Civil Aviation Administration of China in November 1969. On April 1, 1970, construction work aimed at upgrading pre-existing facilities began, which included the construction of a new terminal. On July 1, 1971, Taiyuan Wusu Airport was officially opened, and operations were relocated from Qinxian Airport. In 1984, the terminal building was expanded, and the airport was approved to be opened for foreign traffic on 30 March, 1993.

=== International operations ===
By the 1990s, Taiyuan Wusu Airport was significantly upgraded for international use. On February 21, 1995, Terminal 1 (T1) entered trial operations. On January 21, 1996, the newer runway 13/31 entered trial operations. On December 25, 1996, T1 and runway 13/31 was opened, and the airfield classification was upgraded from 4C to 4D. Subsequently, the old runway and terminal building was decommissioned. On January 12, 2004, it was designated as an international airport, and was approved to expand foreign access. Since March 2006, the airport has undergone an expansion phase with a new terminal at a cost of CNY 1.57 billion, and is capable of serving 6 million passengers a year. Construction was completed in late 2007. Since this expansion, it has been able to serve as a diversionary airport for Beijing Capital International Airport, and notably performed that function during the 2008 Summer Olympics. On November 13, 2007, the airport was renamed to Taiyuan Wusu International Airport. On September 1, 2008, Terminal 2 (T2) opened, and T1 closed 4 days later for renovation. In January 2012, the airfield classification was upgraded from 4D to 4E, and T1 was reopened on January 1, 2014.

Since March 2020, after the easing of the COVID‑19 outbreak in China, some international flights bound for Beijing and Shanghai were diverted to airports such as Taiyuan and Tianjin in order to reduce the pressure of preventing imported cases. The airport is a focus city for both China Eastern Airlines and Hainan Airlines. As of 2020, Taiyuan Wusu International Airport was the 30th busiest airport in the People's Republic of China, with 9,013,205 passengers.

On 7 September 2021, the National Development and Reform Commission (NDRC) officially issued its approval of the Project Proposal for the Phase III Expansion of Taiyuan Wusu International Airport, marking the formal establishment of the project.

At the end of 2021, construction work for the airport’s Phase III expansion officially began. The new works are divided into three major zones: the terminal area, the landside transport area, and the airside flight area. The terminal area includes the T3 terminal building, outdoor works for T3, and an integrated ground‑transportation center.

This phase of the project included a new 400,000‑square‑meter T3 terminal, a second runway 3,600 meters long and 45 meters wide, an apron with 127 aircraft stands, a 50,000‑square‑meter integrated transportation center, a 130,000‑square‑meter parking structure, and new cargo, catering, maintenance, and auxiliary production facilities, along with supporting power, water, drainage, and fuel‑supply infrastructure.

At 7:00 on December 25, 2025, the new second runway of Taiyuan Wusu International Airport was officially put into operation, and the original first runway was closed for renovation.

== Airlines and destinations ==
Airlines	Destinations
9 Air	Nanjing
Air China	Beijing–Capital, Chengdu–Tianfu, Tianjin, Wenzhou, Xining
Air Guilin	Korla, Qitai
Beijing Capital Airlines	Changchun, Haikou, Lijiang, Sanya
China Eastern Airlines	Bangkok–Suvarnabhumi, Beihai, Changsha, Changzhou, Chengdu–Tianfu, Chongqing, Dalian, Fuzhou, Guangzhou, Guilin, Guiyang, Hangzhou, Harbin, Hefei, Hong Kong, Jieyang, Kuala Lumpur-International, Kunming, Nanchang, Nanjing, Nanning, Ningbo, Ordos, Qingdao, Sanya, Shanghai–Hongqiao, Shanghai–Pudong, Shenzhen, Ürümqi, Wenzhou, Wuhan, Wuxi, Xiamen, Yichang, Yinchuan, Zhanjiang; Seasonal: Macau
China Express Airlines	Huai'an, Yancheng, Zhoushan
China Southern Airlines	Changsha, Dalian, Guangzhou, Jiaxing, Shenzhen, Ürümqi, Yiwu, Zhuhai
China United Airlines	Wenzhou
Colorful Guizhou Airlines	Yibin
Donghai Airlines	Jingzhou, Shangrao, Shenzhen, Zhuhai
Fuzhou Airlines	Harbin, Lanzhou
GX Airlines	Yinchuan
Hainan Airlines	Changsha, Dalian, Fuzhou, Guangzhou, Haikou, Hangzhou, Hefei, Nanjing, Qingdao, Sanya, Shenzhen, Ürümqi, Wuhan, Xiamen, Zhuhai
Jiangxi Air	Nanchang
Juneyao Air	Nanjing, Shanghai–Hongqiao, Shanghai–Pudong
Kunming Airlines	Changsha, Chengdu–Tianfu, Chongqing, Guiyang, Kunming, Nanjing, Tengchong
LJ Air	Changsha, Changzhou, Harbin, Huizhou, Qingdao, Xining, Xishuangbanna, Yancheng, Zhanjiang
Loong Air	Chengdu–Tianfu, Shenyang
Lucky Air	Kunming
Okay Airways	Changsha, Shenyang
Ruili Airlines	Chongqing, Kunming, Mangshi, Qingdao, Xining, Yinchuan
Shandong Airlines	Baotou, Changchun, Chongqing, Guiyang, Lanzhou, Linyi, Qingdao, Shenyang, Shiyan, Ürümqi, Wuhan, Xiamen
Shanghai Airlines	Shanghai–Hongqiao
Shenzhen Airlines	Hefei, Nanchang, Nanjing, Nanning, Nantong, Quanzhou, Shenyang, Shenzhen, Wuhan, Wuxi Yichang
Sichuan Airlines	Chengdu–Shuangliu, Chengdu–Tianfu, Chongqing, Sanya, Shenyang
Spring Airlines	Nanchang, Shanghai–Pudong, Shenyang
Suparna Airlines	Zhuhai
Tianjin Airlines	Tianjin
Urumqi Air	Aksu, Urumqi
West Air	Chongqing, Nanning, Yangon
XiamenAir	Fuzhou, Hangzhou, Nanjing, Xiamen
Xizang Airlines	Chengdu–Shuangliu, Harbin, Lijiang

== See also ==
- List of airports in China
- China's busiest airports by passenger traffic
