= JY Air =

Battery electric compact sedan

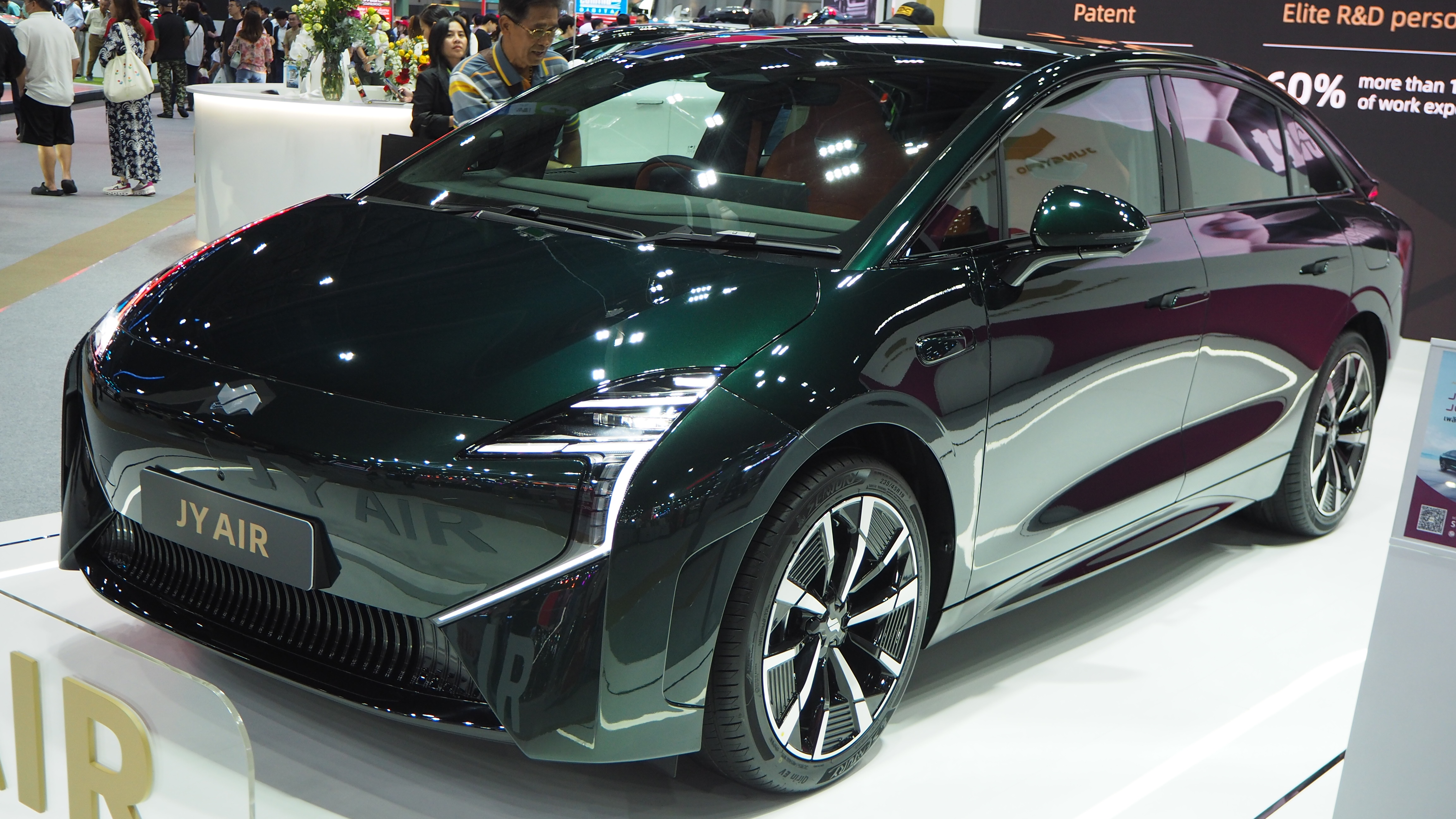
- 2024 Juneyao JY Air Plus (Thailand)

Overview
- Manufacturer: JuneYao Auto
- Production: 2024–present
- Assembly: China: Putian; Thailand: Suphan Buri (SAKUN.C)

Body and chassis
- Class: Compact car
- Body style: 4-door sedan
- Layout: Rear-motor, rear-wheel drive

Powertrain
- Engine: Permanent-magnet synchronous motor
- Power output: 204 hp (152 kW) (Standard); 216 hp (161 kW) (Plus)
- Battery: 51 kWh CATL SENXING LFP; 64 kWh CATL SENXING LFP
- Range: Max 520 km (NEDC)

Dimensions
- Wheelbase: 2,800 mm (110 in)
- Length: 4,550 mm (179 in)
- Width: 1,860 mm (73 in)
- Height: 1,515 mm (60 in)

The JY Air (Chinese: 吉祥AIR; pinyin: Jíxiáng Air), also known as the JuneYao Air, is a battery electric compact sedan produced by JuneYao Auto, the automotive division of the Chinese aviation giant Juneyao Group (which also owns Juneyao Air).

== Overview ==
The JY Air's interior has a Crystal OS-powered 15.6-inch touchscreen. It also adopts the Qualcomm's Snapdragon 8155 chip. JuneYao says that the car's interior is inspired by the business class cabin of airlines.

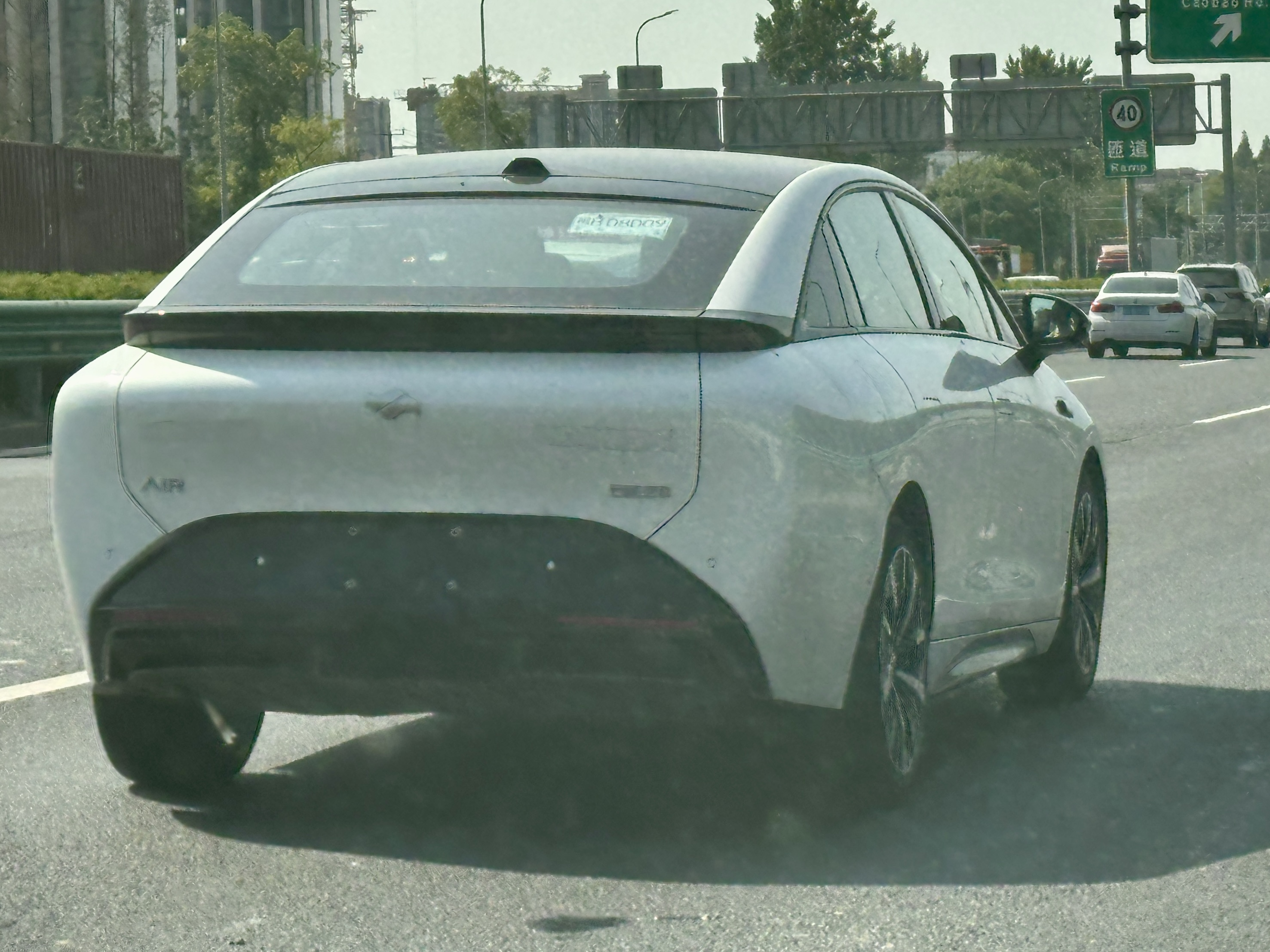
Rear view

== Markets ==
=== Thailand ===
The Air was launched in Thailand on 2 December 2024.

=== China ===
The Air was launched in China on 7 May 2025.

=== Nepal ===
The Air was launched in Nepal on 27 August 2025.

== Sales and production ==
| Year | Sales | |
| Year | China | Thailand |
|---|---|---|
| 2025 | | 45 (Note: Figures based on registration (Thailand)) |
