= Jinzhou Jinzhouwan Airport =

Airport in Liaoning, China

Jinzhou Jinzhouwan Airport 锦州锦州湾机场
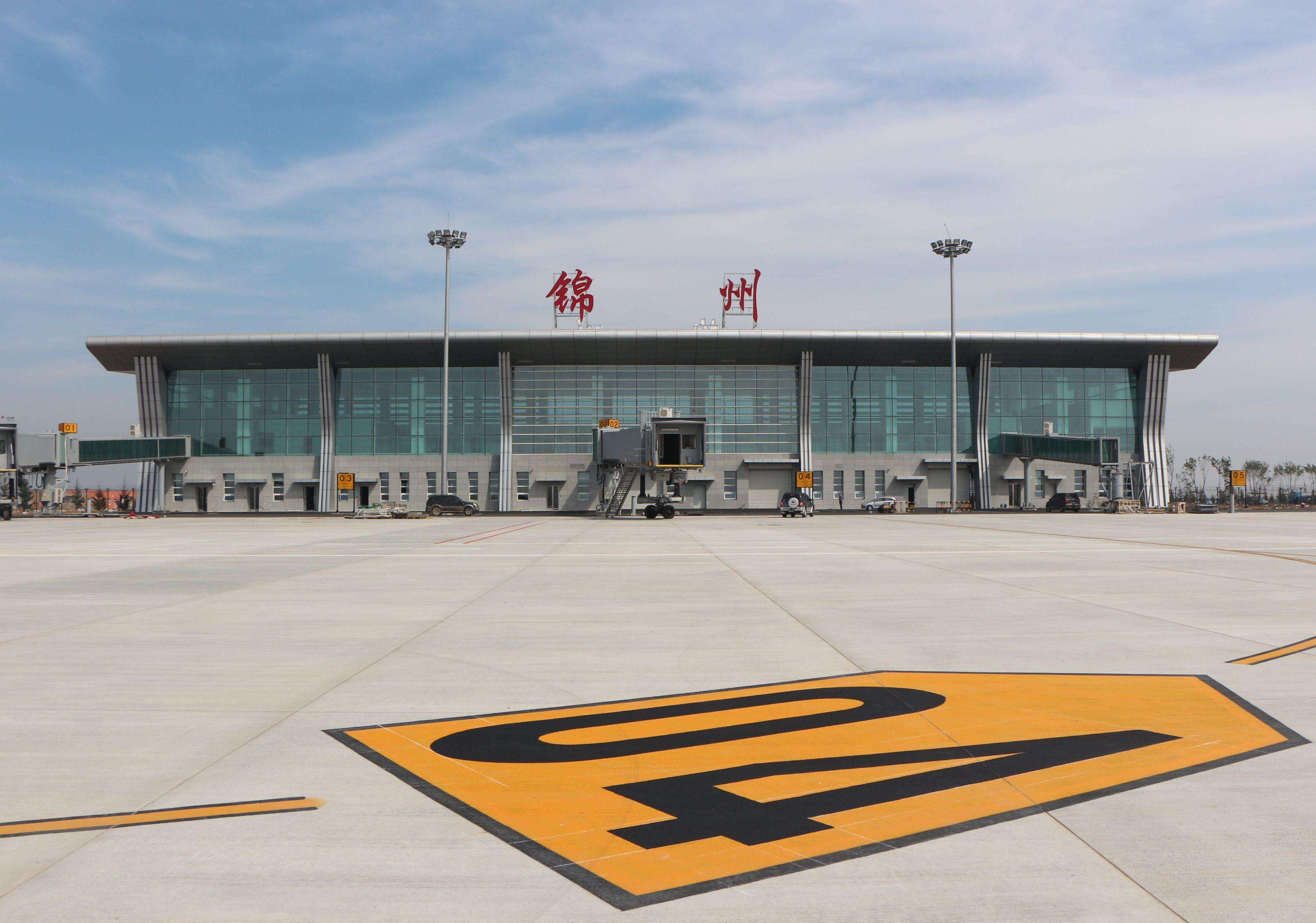
- IATA: JNZ; ICAO: ZYJZ

Summary
- Airport type: Public
- Serves: Jinzhou, Liaoning, China
- Location: Jianye Township, Linghai
- Opened: 10 December 2015; 10 years ago
- Coordinates: 40°55′48″N 121°16′48″E

Map
- Location of airport in Liaoning

Runways
Direction	Length		Surface
Direction	m	ft	Surface
04/22	2,500	8,202	Concrete

Statistics (2025)
- Passengers: 285,167
- Aircraft movements: 2,112
- Cargo (metric tons): 608.9
- Source: List of the busiest airports in the People's Republic of China

Jinzhou Jinzhouwan Airport
- Simplified Chinese: 锦州锦州湾机场
- Traditional Chinese: 錦州錦州灣機場
Transcriptions
Standard Mandarin
- Hanyu Pinyin: Jǐnzhōu Jǐnzhōuwān Jīchǎng

Jinzhou Jinzhouwan Airport (IATA: JNZ, ICAO: ZYJZ) is an airport serving the city of Jinzhou in western Liaoning province of Northeast China. It also called "Jinzhou Bay Airport". It is located in Jianye Township, Linghai city. The airport received approval from the State Council of China in November 2012. The projected total investment is 762 million yuan.

The airport was opened on 10 December 2015, when all flights serving Jinzhou were transferred from the old Jinzhou Xiaolingzi Airport, which became a dedicated military airport.

== History ==
Jinzhou Bay Airport can be traced back to its predecessors, Xiaolingzi Airport and Jinzhou Xiaolingzi Airport.

Xiaolingzi Airport was a military airport built in 1939, and a 500-meter-long and 60-meter-wide runway was built in 1940. In 1993, with the approval of the State Council and the Central Military Commission, Xiaolingzi Airport was expanded and renovated into a joint military-civilian airport. The civilian part of the airport was called Jinzhou Xiaolingzi Airport.

In late 2008, the Jinzhou government decided to relocate the Jinzhou Civil Airport.

On February 12, 2009, the groundbreaking ceremony for Jinzhou Jinzhouwan Airport was held. The airport's flight area was designed to 4C standards, with a newly built 2,500-meter-long runway; the terminal area was designed to meet the target of 550,000 passenger trips and 3,750 cargo throughput by 2020.

On December 10, 2015, Jinzhou Jinzhouwan Airport officially opened. On the same day, civilian routes at Jinzhou Xiaolingzi Airport were suspended.

== Facilities ==
The airport has a 2,500-meter runway (class 4C) and a 7,200-square-meter terminal building. It is projected to handle 550,000 passengers and 3,750 tons of cargo annually.

== Airlines and destinations ==
Airlines	Destinations
China Eastern Airlines	Nanchang, Shanghai–Pudong, Shenzhen, Wuhan, Yangzhou
China United Airlines	Chengdu–Tianfu
XiamenAir	Changzhou, Fuzhou

== See also ==
- List of airports in China
- List of the busiest airports in China
