= Taiyuan Guangshe Airport =

Former airport of Taiyuan, Shanxi, China (1923–1951)

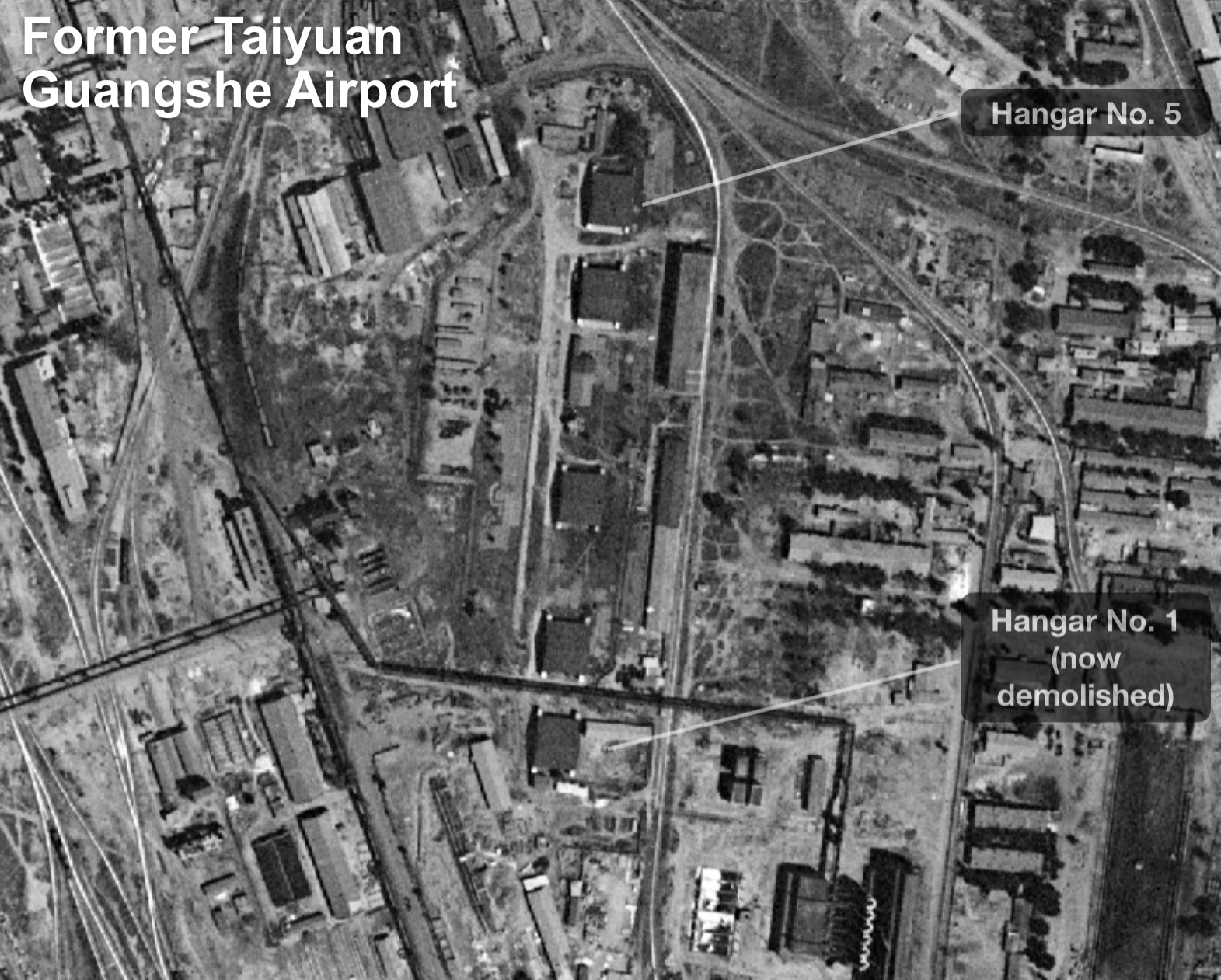
- Remains of Guangshe Airport in May 26, 1967, captured by KH-7.
- IATA: none; ICAO: none

Summary
- Airport type: Defunct
- Serves: Taiyuan
- Location: Shanxi, China
- Opened: May 1934
- Closed: December 1951
- Passenger services ceased: December 1951
- Coordinates: 37°55′53″N 112°31′29″E

Map
- Shown within China Taiyuan Guangshe Airport (Shanxi)

Taiyuan Guangshe Airport, also known as Taiyuan Chengbei Airport and Taiyuan North Airport, was an airport serving Taiyuan located in Guangshe, Shanxi province in North China. It was built in 1923 as the first airport in the province, and formally opened for civilian operations in October 1934. After becoming obsolete by the 1950s, the airport was replaced by Taiyuan Qinxian Airport in December 1951.

== History ==
In 1920, Chinese warlord of Shanxi province, Yan Xishan, sought to develop an Air Force and began sending students to study in France. The Shanxi Military Artisans' Training Factory was also established in Taiyuan, which included an aircraft assembly workshop. In 1923, Chengbei Airport was established by the Shanxi Provincial Governor's Office as a military training airfield. Located outside the North Gate of Taiyuan, (now west of Guangshe Village) it was the first airport in the province, and only had a single earthen runway with minimal facilities. Throughout its early years, it was mainly used for aviation training. In 1925, Yan Xishan sent his secretary and French-trained student Pan Lianru to France to purchase two aircraft. The two of which were named "Peng-1" and "Peng-2," and there were additional plans to acquire 40 more. An aviation corps and an aviation preparatory school were also established at the airport. In 1934, the Northwest Steel Plant began construction near the airfield, which would later become the Taiyuan Steel Plant. On 1 May 1934, civil aviation services commenced at the airport alongside military operations. During noon on 8 November 1934, Chinese military leader Chiang Kai-shek, accompanied by Soong Mei-ling, arrived at Chengbei Airport for a diplomatic mission with Yan Xishan. He had brought military and political dignitaries to the airport to greet them.

In 1937, after the Japanese occupied Taiyuan, they repaired and expanded the airfield. In November 1939, civil aviation services suspended, and were transferred to the nearby Wusu Airport. At the end of World War II, Yan Xishan resumed control of the airport and continued to expand it. On 3 March 1946, a three-person military mediation team arrived at Chengbei Airport. The group composed of CCP representative Zho Enlai, Nationalist representative Zhang Zhizhong, and American advisor Marshall. At some point, five hangars were built, each encompassing approximately 105 square meters. During the Liberation of Taiyuan in 1948, the People's Liberation Army (PLA) captured Wusu Airport, leading to the reinforcement of Chengbei Airport by the defending Shanxi Provincial Army. Throughout the campaign, Chengbei Airport operated as the primary transportation and staging base for Yan's forces, due to its concealment and difficulty for the PLA's artillery to observe and fire at. Guard towers were built at each corner of the five hangars, and a three-level bunker was also built. On 22 April 1949, the 20th Corps led by Yang Chengwu arrived at Guangshe, and the 68th Army captured the airport. Following capture by the PLA, aviation operations completely ceased. After liberation, the bunker was used by the Taiyuan Steel Plant to store toxic and radioactive materials, and a small door was carved into the wall for this purpose.

=== Civilian operations ===
On 1 July 1950, a Sino-Soviet Civil Aviation Station was established at Chengbei Airport. On 1 August 1950, the airport resumed operations and was renamed to Taiyuan Guangshe Airport, named after the nearby Guanshe Village. However, the airport's location and proximity to the Taiyuan Steel plants reduced airspace clearance for aircraft landing and taking off from the runway. In December 1951, civil aviation services were suspended, and operations were transferred to Taiyuan Qinxian Airport. Following the transfer, Guangshe Airport ceased aviation use, and ownership of the airport was transferred to the steel plant for redevelopment.

== Legacy ==
In 2009, the city government designated the old bunker as a historic building, and was placed under protection. The bunker has three levels, one underground and two above ground—built with one meter thick walls using reinforced concrete. The entrance to the bunker was within a tunnel, which also connected to the government building for Yan Xishan's use. During the expansion of the Taiyuan Steel Plant, the No. 1 Hangar was demolished, while the other four were retained. Today, these hangars are the only surviving civil-aircraft hangars from the Republican period in the province, and were integrated into a war relic exhibition area. In August 2014, the Taiyuan Museum Park opened, covering an area of 700,000 square meters, which included the former hangars and bunker, a steam locomotive, and a decommissioned blast furnace site.
