= JuneYao Auto =

Chinese car company

Juneyao Auto
- Industry: Automotive
- Founded: 2023; 3 years ago
- Headquarters: Shanghai, China
- Area served: China; Thailand; Hong Kong
- Key people: Jean Zhu (Director of the Overseas Business Division)
- Products: Electric vehicles
- Parent: Juneyao Group
- Website: juneyaoauto.com

JuneYao Auto (Chinese: 吉祥汽车; pinyin: Jíxiáng Qìchē), sometimes abbreviated to JY Auto, is a Chinese automotive manufacturer. Founded in 2023, JY Auto is headquartered in Shanghai, and manufactures vehicles in Putian, Fujian.

The company was established by Juneyao Group, following its acquisition of Yudo Auto. The group, founded in 1991, is better known for its airline, Juneyao Air.

== Models ==
The Yudo Yuntu continues under the Yudo Auto name and is the sole model that continues under JuneYao ownership.

The first JuneYao branded model is the JY Air launched in 2024 in Thailand and in China from Spring 2025. The 4.55m long car features an aerodynamic design with a drag coefficient of 0.23 Cd.

Two version of the Air are produced; a 51.2 kWh battery with a 147 kW (200 PS; 197 bhp)/ 250 Nm motor powering the rear wheels and can be charged with 70 kW DC. The top level Air has a large 64.1 kWh battery pack a slightly higher output motor 159 kW (216 PS; 213 bhp) and faster 136 kW DC charging.

== Operations ==
Manufacturing for JY Auto takes place in Putian, Fujian, at the former Yudo Auto plant.
