= Zhanjiang Wuchuan International Airport =

Airport in Guangdong, China

- IATA: ZHA; ICAO: ZGZJ

Summary
- Airport type: Public
- Serves: Zhanjiang, Maoming, Yangjiang
- Location: Wuchuan, Zhanjiang, Guangdong, China
- Opened: 24 March 2022; 4 years ago
- Coordinates: 21°28′54″N 110°35′25″E

Map
- Location in Guangdong ZHA/ZGZJ (China)

Runways
Direction	Length		Surface
Direction	m	ft	Surface
15/33	3,200	10,499

Statistics (2025)
- Passengers: 3,122,262
- Aircraft movements: 29,068
- Cargo (metric tons): 11,617.5

Zhanjiang Wuchuan International Airport
- Simplified Chinese: 湛江吴川国际机场
- Traditional Chinese: 湛江吳川國際機場
Transcriptions
Standard Mandarin
- Hanyu Pinyin: Zhànjiāng Wúchuān Guójì Jīchǎng

Zhanjiang Wuchuan International Airport (IATA: ZHA, ICAO: ZGZJ) is an international airport serving Zhanjiang in South China's Guangdong province. It is a civil airport located in Tangdu Town, Wuchuan City, Zhanjiang, Guangdong Province. It is approximately 35 kilometers from downtown Zhanjiang. The airport is classified as a class 4E facility and is the largest and highest-grade airport in the western Guangdong region. The airport opened on 24 March 2022, replacing the Zhanjiang Airport in Xiashan. On 20 February 2024, Zhanjiang Wuchuan Airport was renamed to "Zhanjiang Wuchuan International Airport".

== Airport overview ==
Zhanjiang Wuchuan International Airport is the relocated airport replacing the original Zhanjiang Airport, covering about 57 hectares. It has a single class 4E runway measuring 3,200 by 45 meters, along with a parallel taxiway of the same length. The airport offers 30 aircraft stands—17 contact gates and 13 remote stands—and can handle 5.1 million passengers and 30,000 tons of cargo annually.

The terminal building covers 61,800 square meters and features a two-and-a-half-story concourse design, with a maximum height of 39.1 meters. The first floor includes waiting areas for remote stands, domestic baggage claim, arrival halls, and international arrivals. The second floor houses the check-in counters, domestic security screening, international departure checks, domestic and international departure lounges, and the security control center.

There is also a 100,000-square-meter parking lot with 1,703 parking spaces.

The under-construction branch of the Shenzhen–Zhanjiang high-speed railway runs underneath the airport and will have a station serving the terminal.

== History ==
In October 2009, Guangdong Province held a meeting on the development of Western Guangdong, during which both Zhanjiang and Maoming proposed relocating the old Zhanjiang Airport to a new site between the two cities to build a new international airport.

In July 2010, the governments of Zhanjiang, Maoming, and Guangdong Airport Authority held a joint meeting to discuss the relocation of Zhanjiang Airport. The three parties reached a consensus and signed the "Framework Agreement on the Relocation of Zhanjiang Airport." The meeting also established the Zhanjiang Airport Relocation Leading Group.

By May 2014, preliminary site selection for the relocation was completed. In October, the Civil Aviation Engineering Consulting Company organized experts to conduct on-site inspections and evaluations of three candidate sites: Lianjiang Pingtan, Wuchuan Heshan, and Wuchuan Xinwu. After comprehensive comparison, the experts recommended the Wuchuan Heshan site. In January 2015, the Civil Aviation Administration of China officially approved the relocation project report, endorsing Heshan as the recommended site.

In August 2016, land acquisition and demolition commenced, involving the relocation of nine natural villages including Gaoling, Hemu, Malanpo, Yalan, Changtang, Daxiaowan, Maoyuan, Shanya, and Nating.

On December 20, 2016, the project held a groundbreaking ceremony for initial survey and measurement work, marking the start of full-scale construction.

In May 2017, the Zhanjiang municipal government launched an international design competition for the airport terminal. In June, Guangdong Province proposed upgrading the airport's classification from 4C to 4E, which was approved by the Civil Aviation Administration of China.

By June 2018, all project land had been acquired, and 5,817 residents from the nine villages were relocated to the state-run Wuchuan Forest Farm in Zhongtang Industrial Area.

On October 19, 2019, the construction ceremony for the Zhanjiang Airport relocation project was held, with then Governor of Guangdong Ma Xingrui attending and officially announcing the start of construction.

On January 5, 2021, the Civil Aviation Administration of China officially approved the naming of the relocated airport as "Zhanjiang Wuchuan Airport," with the English name "ZHANJIANG WUCHUAN AIRPORT."

On July 22, 2021, the main structure of the terminal building at Zhanjiang Wuchuan Airport was completed. On September 8, the relocation project, undertaken by China Construction Eighth Engineering Division. Corp. LTD, passed its completion acceptance. On October 21, a China Southern Airlines Airbus A320 successfully landed on the runway, marking the successful completion of on-site test flights.

On November 24, around 200 airport staff and civil aviation families participated in the first trial operation. On December 2, nearly 2,000 Zhanjiang residents took part in a second trial operation, which stress-tested the airport with peak traffic of 40 flights per hour and 4,000 passengers. On March 18, 2022, the final round of pre-opening trial operations took place.

At midnight on March 24, 2022, Zhanjiang Wuchuan Airport officially opened, and the passenger facilities of the existing Zhanjiang Airport were closed, with all flights transferred to Zhanjiang Wuchuan Airport.

On January 12, 2024, Zhanjiang's air port customs expanded its operations to foreign aircraft after passing the national inspection, marking the official international aviation capability of the airport. On February 20, 2024, the airport was officially renamed "Zhanjiang Wuchuan International Airport" by the Civil Aviation Administration of China.

== Airlines and destinations ==
Airlines	Destinations
Air Chang'an	Xi'an
Air China	Beijing–Capital, Chengdu–Tianfu, Chongqing, Hangzhou, Shanghai–Pudong, Wenzhou
China Eastern Airlines	Beijing–Daxing, Chengdu–Tianfu, Ganzhou, Hefei, Jieyang, Kunming, Nanchang, Nanjing, Shanghai–Pudong, Shenyang, Taiyuan, Xi'an
China Express Airlines	Chongqing, Guiyang, Qionghai, Quzhou, Zunyi–Maotai
China Southern Airlines	Guangzhou, Sanya, Zhengzhou
China United Airlines	Beijing–Daxing
LJ Air	Harbin, Ningbo, Taiyuan, Tianjin, Xishuangbanna
Ruili Airlines	Fuzhou, Kunming
Shanghai Airlines	Shanghai–Pudong
Shenzhen Airlines	Nanjing, Quanzhou, Shenzhen
Urumqi Air	Changsha, Chengdu–Tianfu, Kashgar, Wuhan Zhengzhou

== Future development ==
The long-term (2050) plan for the Zhanjiang Airport relocation project envisions an annual passenger throughput of 17 million and cargo throughput of 102,000 tons. Plans include constructing a second parallel taxiway, increasing the number of aircraft parking stands to 45 (including 5 E-class stands and 40 C-class stands), and expanding the terminal building area to 155,000 square meters.

== See also ==
- Zhanjiang Airport
- List of airports in China
