= Ganzhou Huangjin Airport =

Airport serving Ganzhou, Jiangxi, China

Ganzhou Huangjin Airport 赣州黄金机场
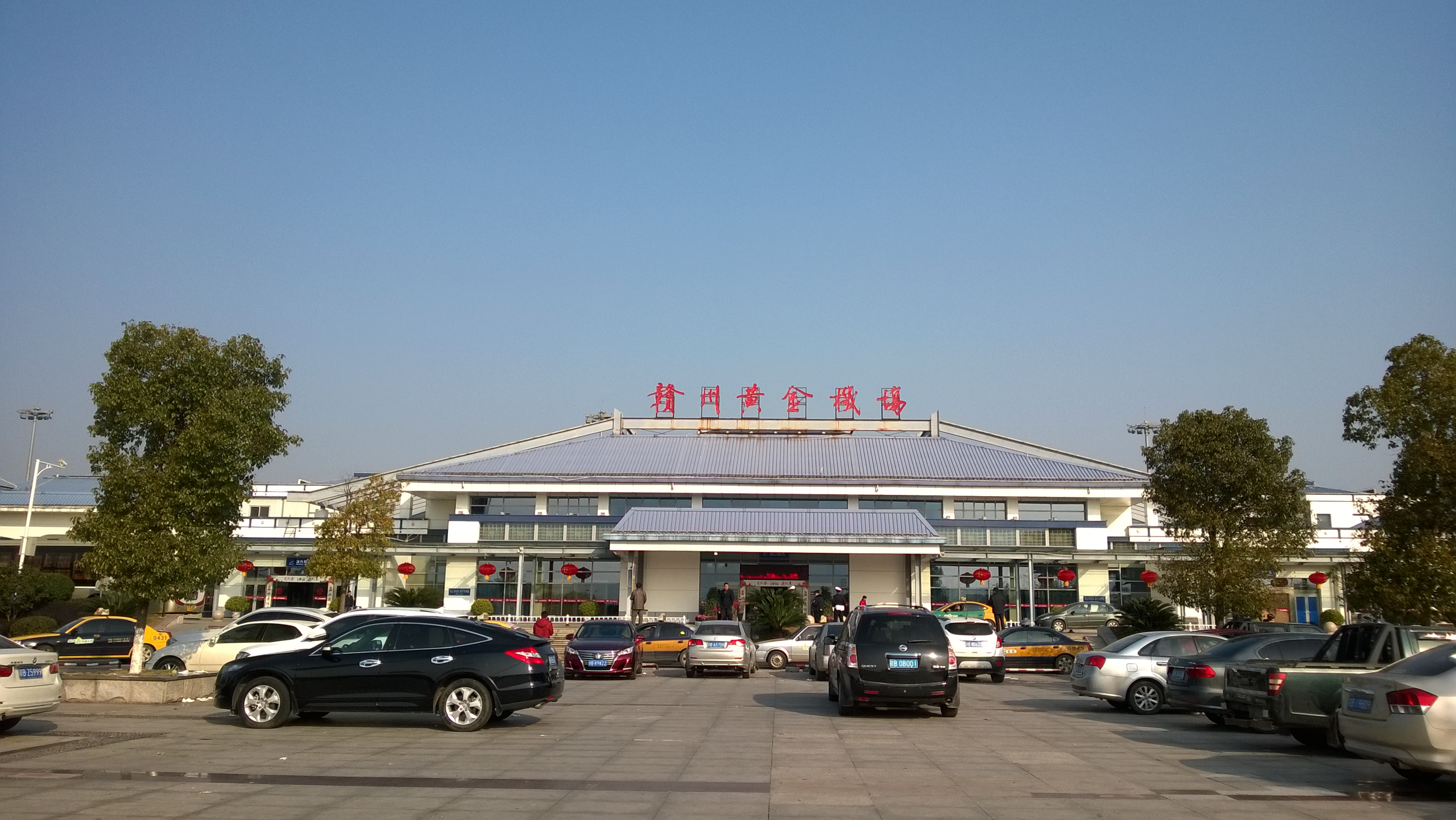
- Terminal 1 building (under reconstruction)
- IATA: KOW; ICAO: ZSGZ

Summary
- Airport type: Public
- Serves: Ganzhou
- Location: Fenggang, Nankang, Ganzhou, Jiangxi, China
- Opened: 26 March 2008; 18 years ago
- Coordinates: 25°51′06″N 114°46′36″E

Map
- Location of airport in Jiangxi

Runways
Direction	Length		Surface
Direction	m	ft	Surface
07/25	2,600	8,530	Asphalt

Statistics (2025)
- Passengers: 2,235,615
- Aircraft movements: 18,676
- Cargo (metric tons): 7,527.1

Ganzhou Huangjin Airport
- Simplified Chinese: 赣州黄金机场
- Traditional Chinese: 贛州黃金機場
Transcriptions
Standard Mandarin
- Hanyu Pinyin: Gànzhōu Huángjīn Jīchǎng

Ganzhou Huangjin Airport (IATA: KOW, ICAO: ZSGZ) is an airport serving the city of Ganzhou in East China's Jiangxi province. It is located in the town of Fenggang in Nankang District of Ganzhou. It is 16 kilometers from the city center of Ganzhou.

The airport was built with a total investment of 520 million yuan to replace the old airport of the same name. After the last flight departed the old airport on 25 March 2008, all services were transferred to the new airport, which officially opened the next day.

== History ==
Ganzhou Airport was originally called Nanwai Airport, located at the former Nanmenwai Daxiaochang (the site of the present-day Jiangxi Air Pressure Plant). Construction of the airport began in 1930 and was built by the Kuomintang government for political and military needs. It was completed in 1932 and was mainly used for military purposes and the transportation of tungsten ore from southern Jiangxi. It also served as a landing point for flights to Chongqing. In 1936, the airport was moved to Huangjin Airport.

The construction was completed in 1937, the main runway, paved with gravel, was 1200 meters long, and the secondary runway was 900 meters long. Both runways were 40 meters wide and 32 centimeters thick. The airport was primarily used for military purposes at the time, but civilian flights also flew to Chongqing, the wartime capital.

During World War II, the U.S. Air Force Fourteenth Air Force used the airport as a photographic reconnaissance base as part of its support for China's resistance against Japan. U.S. troops flew P-38 Lightning fighters equipped with mapping cameras but without weapons from Ganzhou Airport to areas controlled by the Japanese to obtain intelligence. In 1938, the original Nanwai Airport was completely destroyed and abandoned by Japanese aircraft. Shortly afterward, Huangjin Airport was also bombed by the Japanese army. The bombing was most severe in 1945, with the airport runway riddled with bomb craters, rendering the airport unusable and essentially paralyzed.

The main runway was renovated and repaired in October 1959, and widened by 10 meters. The airport reopened to civil aviation on November 13 of the same year. However, it was subsequently suspended several times.

The airport's major development period was in the mid-to-late 1980s. In July 1987, with the approval of the Civil Aviation Administration of China, Huangjin Airport began expansion construction. The works were completed on July 10, 1988. A concrete runway, 1,600 meters long, 30 meters wide and 22 centimeters thick, was built, which can accommodate aircraft up to BAE-146 and meets the 3C standard. Navigation beacons, aprons, and a liaison station were also built. From October 10, 1988 to May 30, 1992, the airport opened routes to Nanchang and Guangzhou.

In July 1992, the airport underwent a second phase of expansion, increasing the runway to 2200 meters and adding runway lighting, an air traffic control tower, and a terminal building, achieving 4C airworthiness standards. The types of aircraft that could take off and land also evolved from the early Y-5, to the Soviet-made Il-2, Il-14, and An-14, and now to the Boeing 737—something we couldn't have imagined at the time.

On March 25, 2008, the last flight to Xiamen, MU2993, departed the airport. After all airport services were transferred to the newly built Ganzhou Huangjin Airport, this airport was permanently closed. The new Huangjin Airport is located in Emei Village, Fenggang Town, Nankang District, 16 kilometers from downtown Ganzhou. It covers an area of 2,668 mu (approximately 174 hectares) and was planned as a 4D-level civil airport, but was initially built to 4C-level regional airport standards. The total investment was 520 million yuan. It officially opened to traffic on March 26, 2008.

From March 22, 2013, the Ganzhou Municipal People's Government, together with the Civil Aviation Administration of East China, held a review meeting on the overall plan of Ganzhou Huangjin Airport. The expert group believed that the submitted "Overall Plan of Ganzhou Huangjin Airport" was feasible in principle and agreed to pass the review. According to the plan, Ganzhou Huangjin Airport will be built into a medium-sized airport, with a short-term goal of 2 million passengers per year by 2025 and a long-term goal of 5 million passengers per year by 2045.

In 2025, the airport will handle 2,235,615 passengers, a 15.4% increase compared to the same period last year, and about 12% higher than the planned target.

== Facilities ==
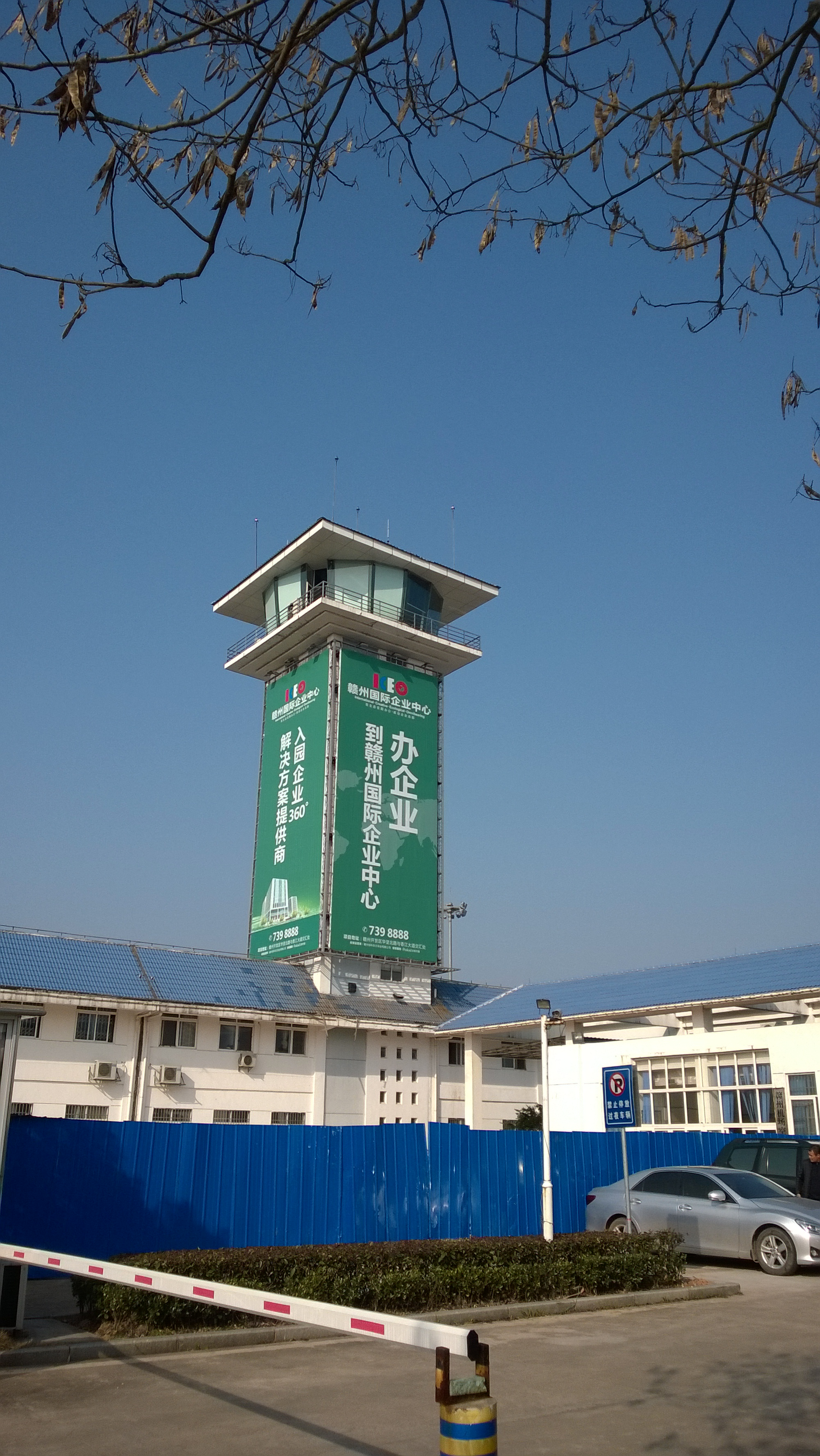
Control tower

The airport has a runway that is 2,600 meters (8,530 ft 2 in) long, 45 meters (147 ft 8 in) wide, and 34 centimeters (13 in) thick (class 4C, expandable to 4D). It also has a 7,186-square-meter (77,350 sq ft) terminal building and a 36,000-square-meter (390,000 sq ft) aircraft parking lot with five parking aprons. It is designed with an annual handling capacity of 500,000 passengers, 3,000 tons of cargo, and 6,200 aircraft movements. The airport occupies an area of 2668 mu (178 ha).

== Airlines and destinations ==
Airlines	Destinations
Air China	Beijing–Capital
China Eastern Airlines	Hefei, Qingdao, Shanghai–Hongqiao, Shanghai–Pudong, Zhanjiang
China Express Airlines	Changzhou, Chongqing, Tianjin, Wenzhou, Zhoushan
China Southern Airlines	Beijing–Daxing
GX Airlines	Dalian, Nanning, Qingdao
Loong Air	Guiyang, Ningbo
Lucky Air	Chengdu–Tianfu, Haikou, Hangzhou, Harbin, Jinan, Kunming, Nanjing
Sichuan Airlines	Chengdu–Tianfu
Tianjin Airlines	Xi'an, Zhuhai
West Air	Sanya, Zhengzhou

== See also ==
- Ganzhou Huangjin Airport (former)
- List of airports in China
- List of the busiest airports in China
