= Ganzhou Huangjin Airport (former) =

Former airport that served Ganzhou, Jiangxi, China (1936–2008)

Ganzhou Huangjin Airport 赣州黄金机场
- IATA: ~~KOW~~; ICAO: ~~ZSGZ~~

Summary
- Airport type: Defunct
- Serves: ~~Ganzhou~~
- Location: Shuinan New Area, Zhanggong, Ganzhou, Jiangxi, China
- Opened: 13 November 1959
- Closed: 25 March 2008
- Built: 1936
- Coordinates: 25°49′36″N 114°54′46″E

Map
- Location of airport in China

Runways
Direction	Length		Surface
Direction	m	ft	Surface
~~07/25~~	2,200	7,218	~~Concrete~~ (closed)

Ganzhou Huangjin Airport ~~(IATA: KOW, ICAO: ZSGZ)~~ was an airport that served the city of Ganzhou in East China's Jiangxi province. It was located in Shuinan New Area in Zhanggong District, and was named after the nearby village of Huangjin. Originally built in 1936, it was one of the first civil airports in China, but was closed on 25 March 2008 when all services were transferred to the new airport of the same name.

== History ==
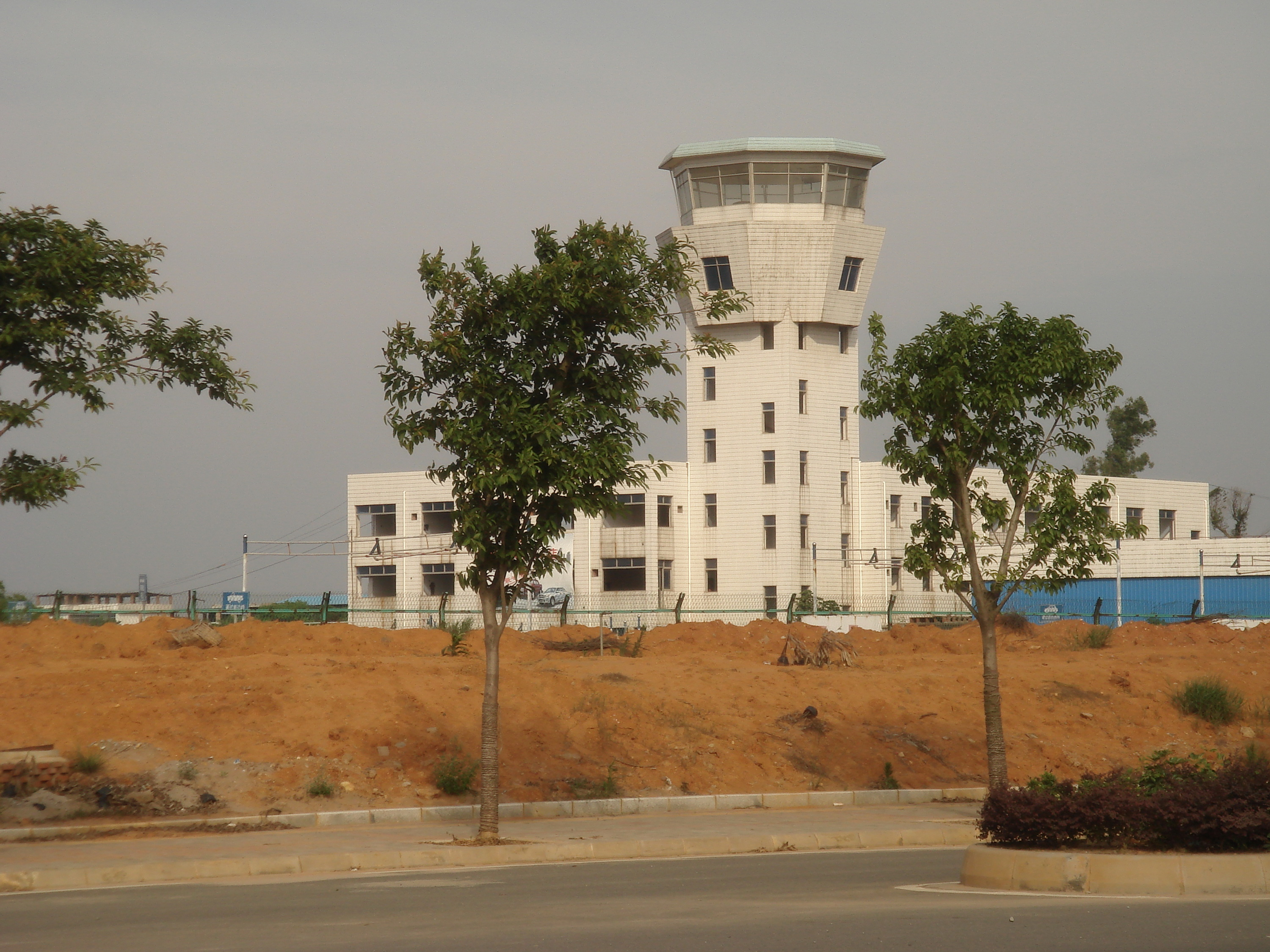
The terminal building of the former airport.

The earliest construction of the airport is 1930, and was originally called Nanwai (南外) airport, serving as a rudimentary waypoint between Chongqing and all points to southern and eastern seaboard. The airport was rebuilt in 1936 with a 1,200-meter main runway and a 900-meter auxiliary runway. Both runways were 40 meters wide and 32 centimeters thick. The airport was mainly used by the military, but also had civil flights to Chongqing, China's wartime capital.

During World War II, the airport was known as Kanchow (Kan Hsien) Airfield and was used by the United States Army Air Forces Fourteenth Air Force as part of the China Defensive Campaign (1942–1945). Kanchow was used as a photo-reconnaissance base by the Americans, which flew unarmed P-38 Lightning aircraft equipped with an array of mapping cameras on combat missions over Japanese-held territory. The airport also was the temporary base of many P-51 Mustang and B-25 Mitchell medium bombers during the war, which rotated flights in and out of the airfield frequently. The Americans closed their facilities at the airport in September 1945 at the end of the war.

In 1959 the main runway was repaired and widened by 10 meters, and the airport was opened to civil flights on 13 November 1959, but later ceased operation. In 1987 and 1992 the airport was expanded twice, with its runway lengthened to 2,200 meters and widened to 45 meters (class 4C). It was closed for the last time on 25 March 2008, when all flights were transferred to the new Ganzhou Huangjin Airport. Its final flight was China Eastern Airlines Flight 2993 to Xiamen Gaoqi International Airport.

== See also ==
- List of airports in China
