= Taiyuan Qinxian Airport =

Former airport of Taiyuan, Shanxi, China (1948–1975)

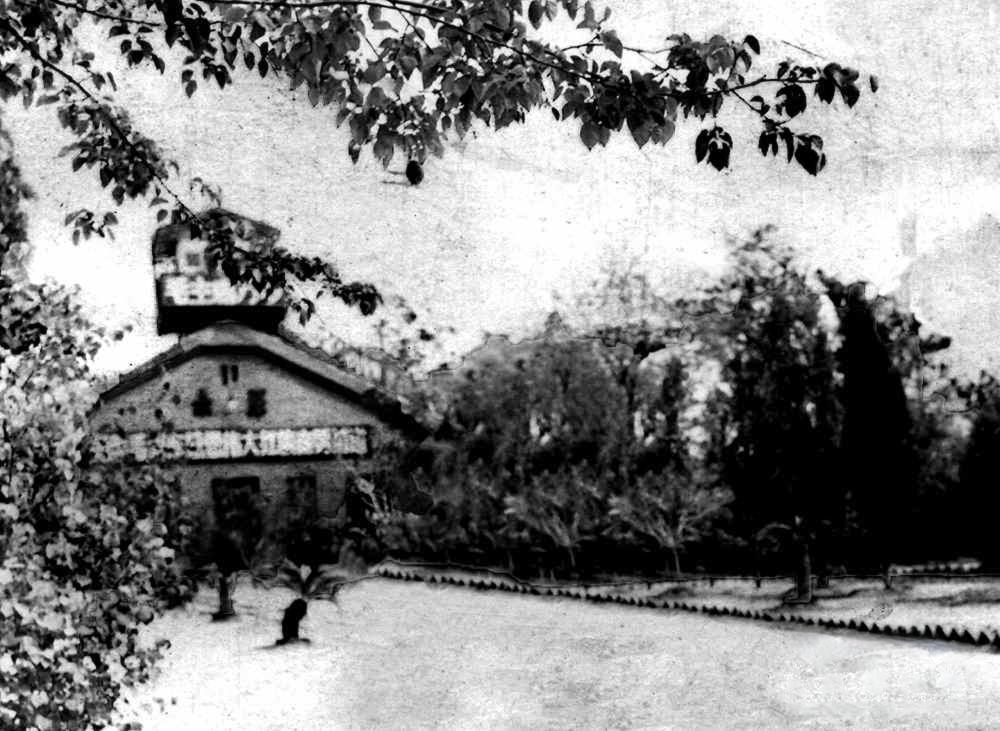
- The terminal of Taiyuan Qinxian Airport during the 1960s.
- IATA: none; ICAO: none

Summary
- Airport type: Defunct
- Serves: Taiyuan
- Location: Xiaodian District, Shanxi, China
- Opened: October 1950
- Closed: 1975
- Passenger services ceased: July 1971
- Coordinates: 37°49′37″N 112°33′33″E

Map
- Location in Shanxi Location in China

Runways
| Direction | Length | | Surface |
| Direction | m | ft | Surface |
|---|---|---|---|
| 18/36 | 1,484 | 4,868.8 | Concrete |

Taiyuan Qinxian Airport was a domestic airport serving Taiyuan located in Xiaodian District, Shanxi province in North China. It was built in 1948 and formally opened for civilian operations in October 1950, and became obsolete by the 1970s. The airport was replaced by Taiyuan Wusu International Airport in July 1971, and was decommissioned in 1975.

== History ==
Before liberation, Taiyuan had two airports, one was Wusu Airport, which was for military use, and the other was Taiyuan Chengbei Airport, which was for civilian use. During the Liberation of Taiyuan in 1948, the People's Liberation Army captured Taiyuan Wusu Airport. The defending Shanxi Provincial Army led by warlord Yan Xishan were trapped within the city, facing food shortages and a low morale. Qinxian Airport and an adjacent barracks was subsequently established in October 1948 in the Dayingpan area of the city. The airport was able to accommodate transport aircraft, and the barracks garrisoned the Second and Third Battalions. The airfield was used to evacuate personnel and fly in supplies. The existing Chengbei Airport was also reinforced, and two temporary backup airfields were established at Gelaogou and Honggou. After the PLA captured Taiyuan, operations at Qinxian Airport were suspended in December 1949 but the airport was retained.

=== Civilian operations ===
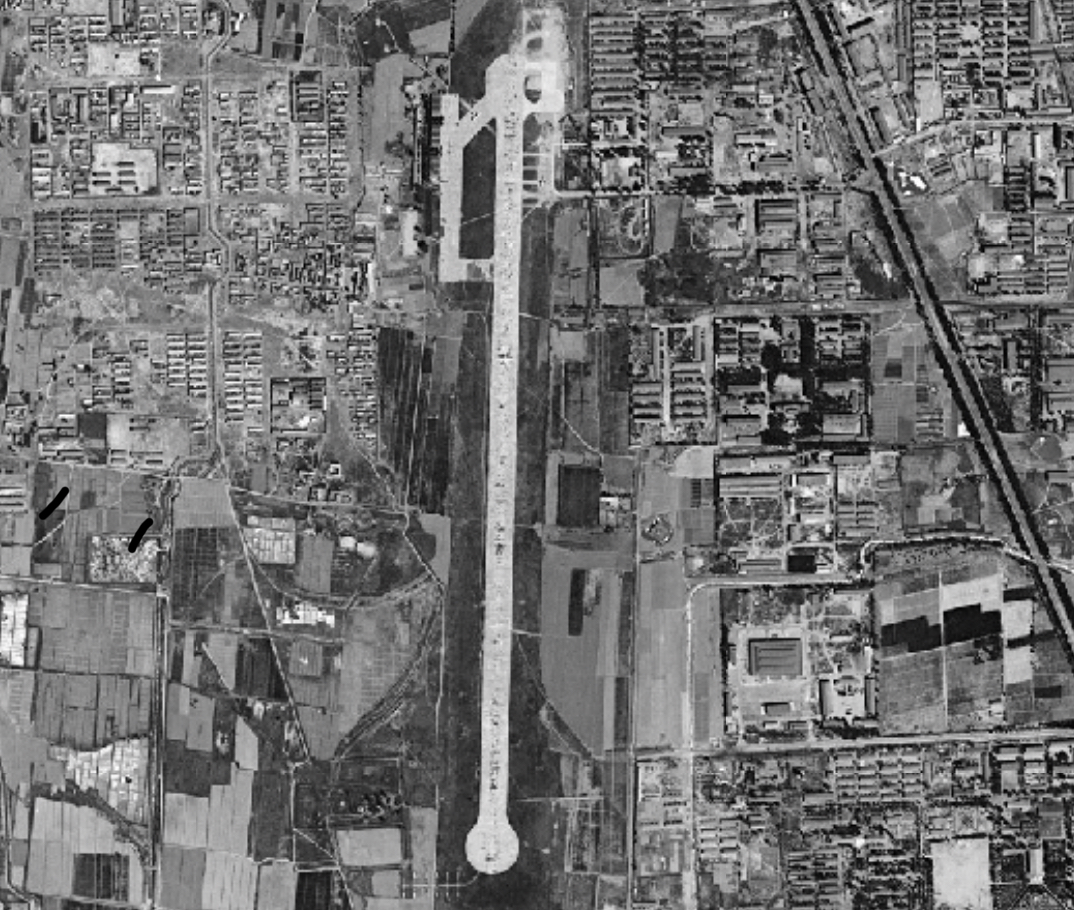
Declassified satellite imagery of Qinxiang Airport captured by KH-7 Gambit on 26 May, 1967.

In October 1950, Qinxian Airport was reopened for operations. In July 1950, the Sino-Soviet Civil Aviation Taiyuan Station was established at Chengbei Airport, however due to its proximity to Taiyuan Steel which reduced airspace clearance, it was relocated to Qinxian Airport in December 1951. As a result, Qinxian Airport began functioning as a civil aviation facility for Taiyuan. The ownership of the former barracks was transferred to the Civil Aviation Bureau of the Military Commission for the construction of the Taiyuan Civil Aviation Machinery Repair Factory. On 15 January 1951, construction of the factory began, and was completed on 25 April. The factory inauguration ceremony was held on 1 May 1951. On 7 May 1952, the Taiyuan Civil Aviation Machinery Repair Factory was placed under the Aviation Industry Bureau of the Ministry of Heavy Industry of the Central People's Government, and on 28 June it was renamed State-Owned Factory No. 221, with the external name Taiyuan Taihang Instrument Factory.

In January 1955, the civil aviation organization at the airport was official named Civil Aviation Taiyuan Station, and operated as a regional branch of the Civil Aviation Administration of China (CAAC), responsible for managing flights. In January 1960, responsibility for the station was transferred to the Civil Aviation Administration of Shanxi Province. On 1 November 1964, Qinxian Airport was included in two CAAC Airlines routes, which included the Peking - Taiyuan - Sian - Lanchow route and Peking - Taiyuan - Sian - Chengtu route. By 1967, Qinxian Airport operated an approximately 1,484 meter long and 50 meter wide concrete runway, equipped with turnaround pads on both ends. On the northern end is a concrete apron with 9 small hangars.

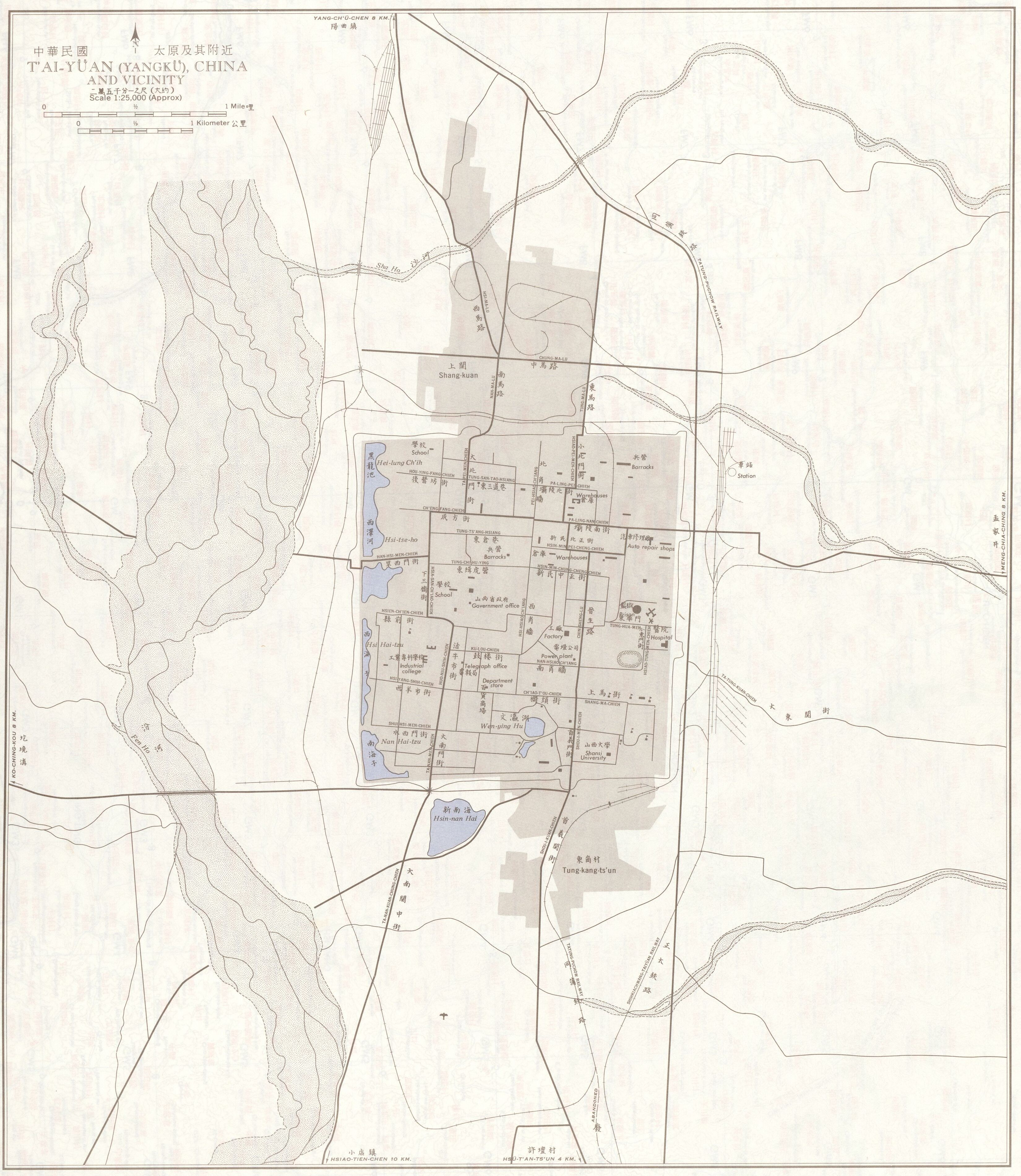
Map of Taiyuan, made 1954 by U.S. Army, with the airport depicted with a basic indication in the lower half of the map.

=== Closure ===
By the 1970s, Qinxian Airport was unable to cater the city's growing demand, and plans were made to replace the airport. Furthermore, the city of Taiyuan had encroached to the airport, with the surrounding buildings and overhead high-voltage lines exceeding the airport clearance requirements, similarly to how Chengbei Airport closed. In July 1971, all civil aviation operations were relocated to Taiyuan Wusu International Airport. In 1975, Qinxian Airport was officially decommissioned and demolished. However, the Taihang Instrument Factory remained at the former Qinxian site.
