= Jinzhou Xiaolingzi Airport =

Jinzhou Xiaolingzi Airport 锦州小岭子机场
- IATA: JNZ; ICAO: ZYJZ

Summary
- Airport type: Military (former public)
- Location: Jinzhou, Liaoning, China
- Coordinates: 41°06′05″N 121°03′42″E

Map
- Location of airport in Liaoning

Runways
Direction	Length		Surface
Direction	m	ft	Surface
02/20	2,600	8,530	Concrete

Jinzhou Xiaolingzi Airport (Chinese: 锦州小岭子机场) is a military airport in the city of Jinzhou in Liaoning province, Northeast China. It was converted to a civil/military dual-use airport in 1993. On 10 December 2015, the new Jinzhou Bay Airport was opened and all civil flights were transferred to the new airport. Xiaolingzi Airport reverted to its original use as a military airport.

== Facilities ==
The airport has one runway which is 2,600 metres (8,530 ft) long with ILS on one side.

== See also ==
- List of airports in China
- List of People's Liberation Army Air Force airbases
