= 9 Air =

Chinese low-cost airline

9 Air 九元航空

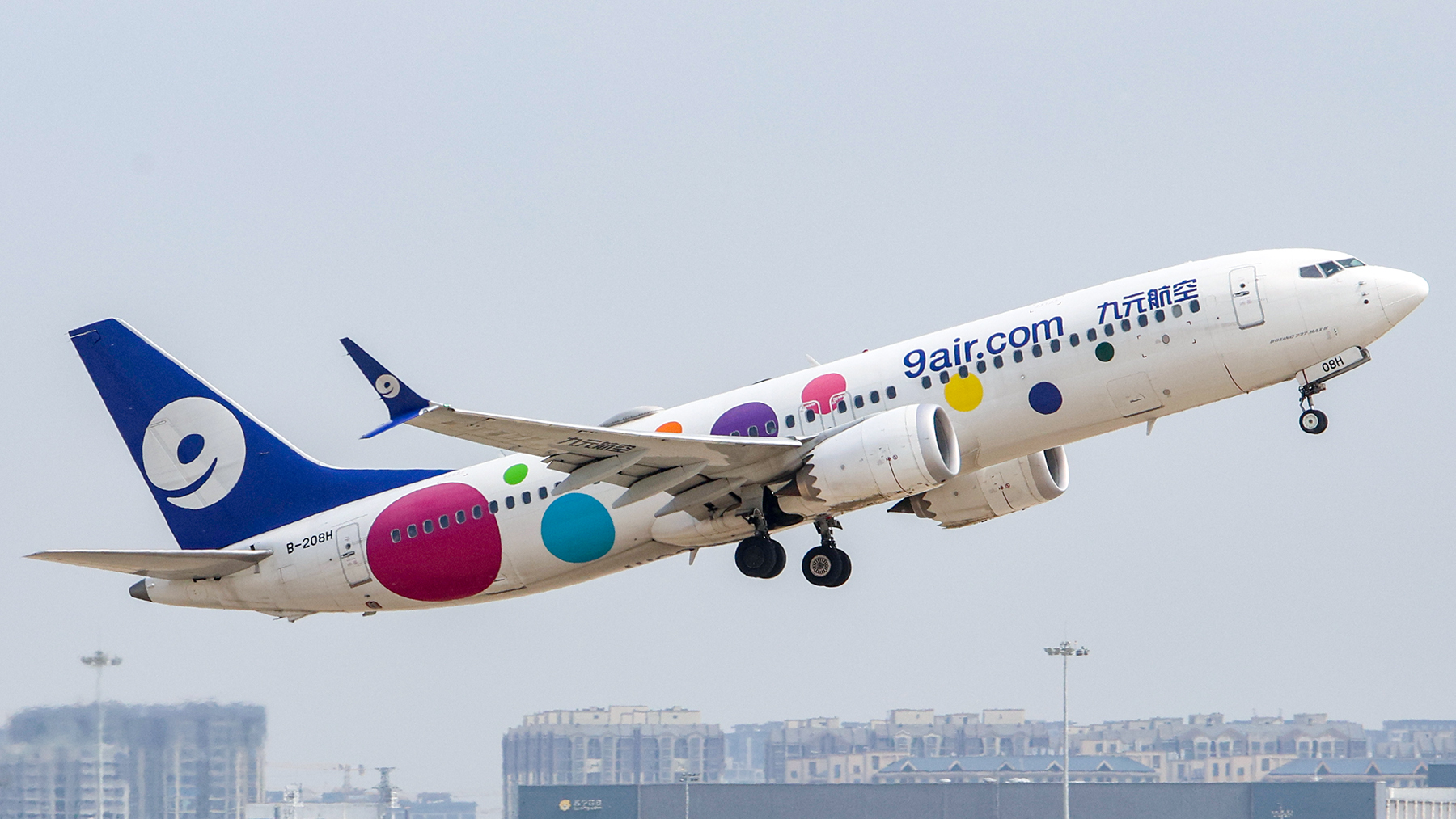
- A Boeing 737 MAX of 9 Air
IATA	ICAO	Call sign
AQ	JYH	TRANS JADE
- Founded: February 12, 2014; 12 years ago
- Commenced operations: December 2, 2014; 11 years ago
- Hubs: Guangzhou Baiyun International Airport
- Fleet size: 27
- Destinations: 60
- Parent company: Juneyao Air
- Headquarters: Guangzhou, Guangdong, China
- Website: 9air.com

9 Air
- Chinese: 九元航空公司
Transcriptions
Standard Mandarin
- Hanyu Pinyin: Jiǔyuán Hángkōng Gōngsī
- Wade–Giles: Chiu^{3}-yüan^{2} Hang^{2}-k'ung^{1}-kung^{1}-ssŭ^{1}
Yue: Cantonese
- Jyutping: gau2 jyun4 hong4 hung1 gung1 si1

Jiuyuan Airlines Co., Ltd or 9 Air (九元航空) is a Chinese low-cost airline headquartered in Baiyun, Guangzhou, Guangdong, China. 9 Air was created as a subsidiary of Juneyao Air in 2014.

9 Air is the first and only low-cost airline in Central and Southern China, with Guangzhou Baiyun International Airport as the main operating base. It launched its first flight on December 2, 2014, and officially started commercial operations on January 15, 2015.

== History ==
On 2 December 2014, 9 Air commenced first charter flight from Baiyun Airport to Zhanjiang Airport.

9 Air's daily operations were initiated on 15 January 2015 for the route from Guangzhou – Wenzhou – Harbin.

On August 30, 2014, the first aircraft of 9 Air arrived in Guangzhou, a Boeing 737-8GP(WL) with tail number B-1715 leased from CMIG Aviation Leasing. The vertical tail was painted orange.

On July 15, 2016, Boeing delivered the first 9 Air-owned aircraft on the anniversary of Boeing's 100th birthday. For this Boeing 737-800, 9 Air and Boeing chose a special commemorative edition of gold tail livery.

On January 23, 2018, the 9 Air's Wi-Fi Internet service test on the Boeing 737 was successful. 9 Air became the first domestic airline to achieve in-flight Wi-Fi access on a narrow-body aircraft.

On October 30, 2018, the 17th new aircraft and the first Boeing 737 MAX arrived in Guangzhou, tail number B-206J, and the vertical tail was painted in red.

On July 8, 2019, 9 Air launched a direct flight from Guangzhou to Sihanoukville, Cambodia, becoming the first Chinese airline operating this route. As of June 2020, 9 Air is no longer operating this route.

On March 17, 2020, 9 Air flew the first cargo charter flight between China and Myanmar, and received the Chinese Chamber of Commerce in Myanmar's request for assistance. 9 Air flew flight AQ1359 Guangzhou-Yangon, delivering urgently needed materials to ensure the normal operation and stability of the local Chinese business plants and overseas Chinese workers. On March 19, 2020, four rescue flights were dispatched from Shenzhen and Guangzhou, and 573 Hubei citizens who were stranded in Thailand were able to return home safely.

On March 31, 2020, 9 Air successfully obtained the cabin cargo operation qualification from CAAC.

== Services ==
=== Economy ===
9 Air offers all-economy seating across its fleet. The cabin includes extra leg room seats, the ability to buy on board meals, and non-alcoholic drinks.

== Destinations ==
As of April 2026 the airline serves destinations in 6 countries throughout East Asia and South East Asia.

== Fleet ==
As of August 2025, 9 Air operates the following aircraft:

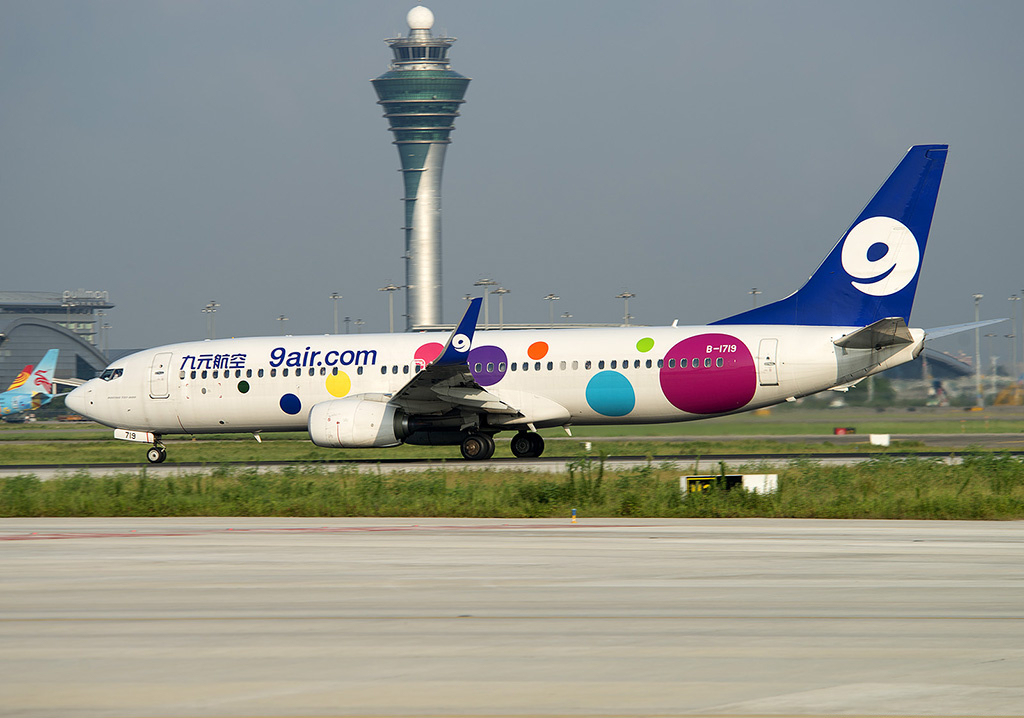
Boeing 737-800

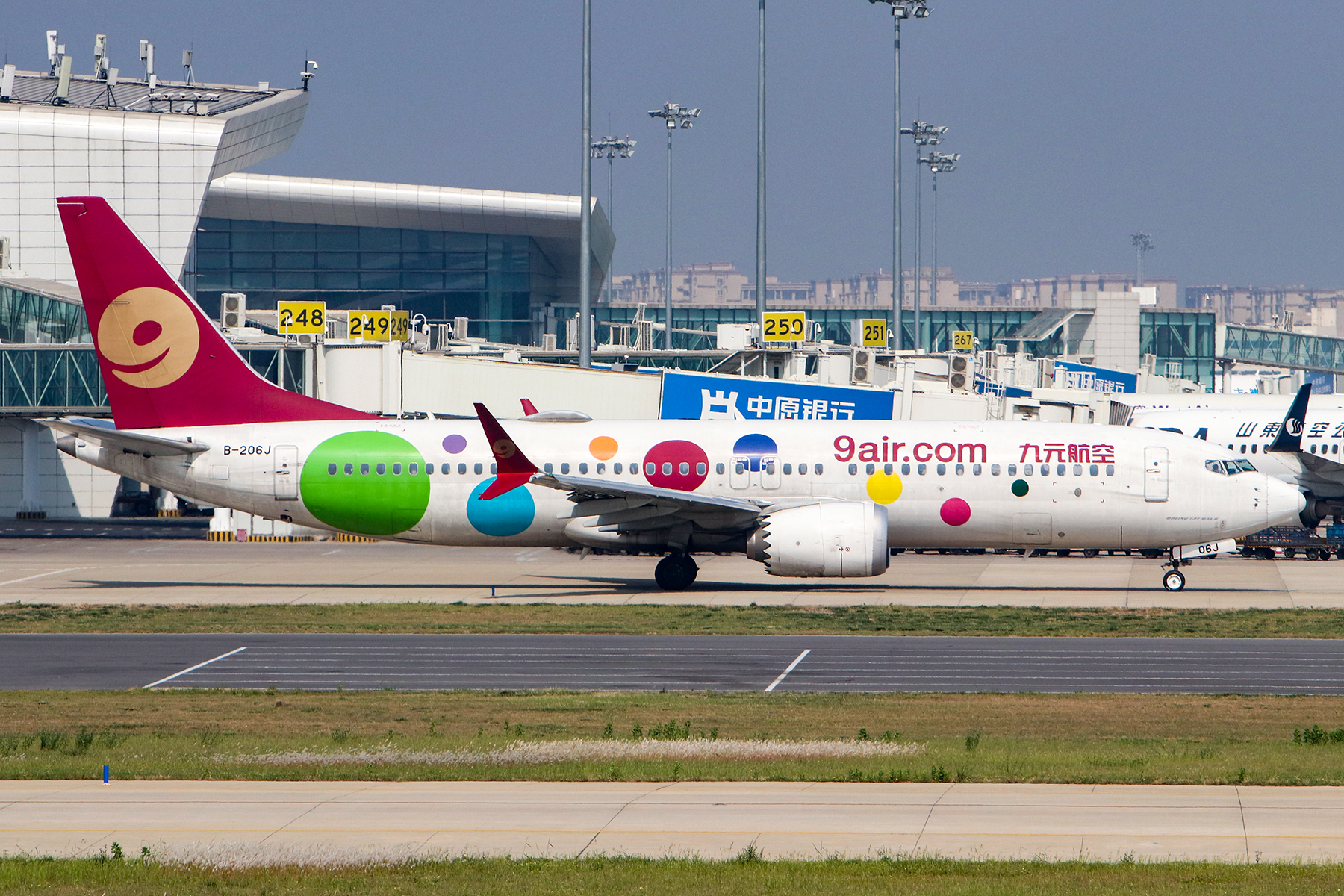
Boeing 737 MAX 8

9 Air fleet
Aircraft	In service	Orders	Passengers	Notes
Boeing 737-800	22	—	189	
Boeing 737 MAX 8	5	—	189	
Total	27	—		
