= Zhanjiang Airport =

Former airport in Guangdong, China

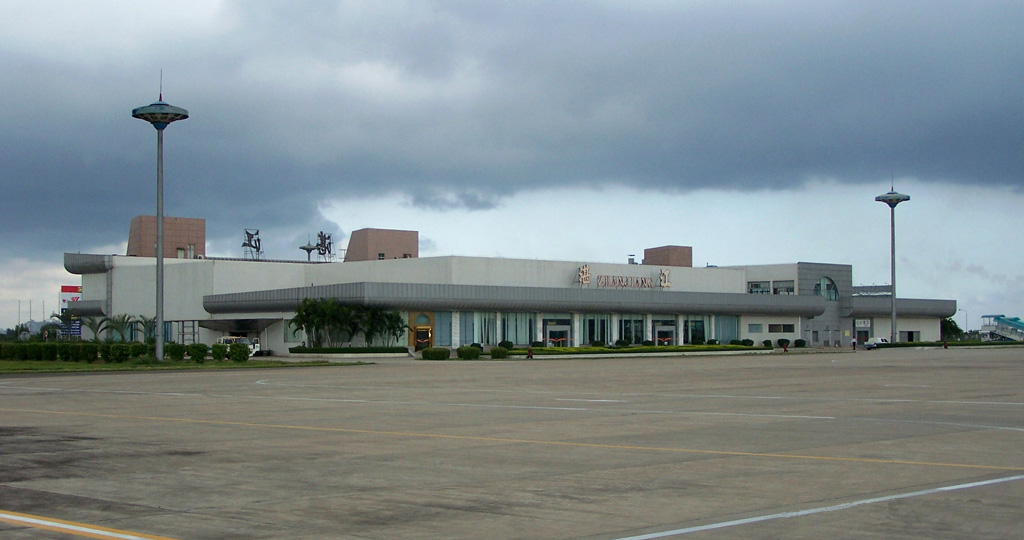
- IATA: ZHA; ICAO: ZGZJ

Summary
- Airport type: Defunct
- Serves: Zhanjiang
- Location: Xiashan, Zhanjiang, Guangdong, China
- Opened: 1952
- Closed: 24 March 2022
- Elevation AMSL: 38 m / 125 ft
- Coordinates: 21°13′03″N 110°21′28″E

Map
- Location within Guangdong

Runways
Direction	Length		Surface
Direction	m	ft	Surface
16/34	2,400	7,874	Asphalt (closed)

Statistics (2021)
- Passengers: 2,508,238
- Aircraft movements: 28,206
- Cargo (metric tons): 5,794.8
- Source: List of the busiest airports in the People's Republic of China

Zhanjiang Airport
- Traditional Chinese: 湛江機場
- Simplified Chinese: 湛江机场
Transcriptions
Standard Mandarin
- Hanyu Pinyin: Zhànjiāng Jīchǎng
Yue: Cantonese
- Jyutping: zaam3 gong1 gei1 coeng4

Alternative Chinese name
- Traditional Chinese: 湛江西廳國際機場
- Simplified Chinese: 湛江西厅国际机场
Transcriptions
Standard Mandarin
- Hanyu Pinyin: Zhànjiāng Xītīng Guójì Jīchǎng
Yue: Cantonese
- Jyutping: zaam3 gong1 sai1 teng1 gwok3 zai3 gei1 coeng4

Zhanjiang Airport (Chinese: 湛江机场) (IATA: ZHA, ICAO: ZGZJ) was an airport in Zhanjiang, Guangdong, China.

It was also called Zhanjiang Xiting International Airport (Chinese: 湛江西厅国际机场), Zhanjiang Potou International Airport (Chinese: 湛江坡头国际机场), or Zhanjiang Xiashan International Airport (Chinese: 湛江霞山国际机场). It began operations in 1952 and closed on 24 March 2022, when the new Zhanjiang Wuchuan Airport opened.

== See also ==
- List of airports in China
