= Hengyang Bajialing Airport =

- IATA: ~~HNY~~; ICAO: ~~ZGHY~~

Summary
- Airport type: Military/Public (defunct)
- Serves: Hengyang, Hunan, China
- Coordinates: 26°54′19″N 112°37′40″E

Map
- Location of the airport Bajialing Airport (China)

Runways
Direction	Length		Surface
Direction	m	ft	Surface
03/21	1,575	5,167	Paved

Hengyang Bajialing Airport
- Traditional Chinese: 衡陽八甲嶺機場
- Simplified Chinese: 衡阳八甲岭机场
Transcriptions
Standard Mandarin
- Hanyu Pinyin: Héngyáng Bājiǎlǐng Jīchǎng
- Wade–Giles: Heng-yang Pa-chia-ling Chi-ch'ang

Hengyang Bajialing Airport is a former military and civil airport in the city of Hengyang in Hunan Province, China. It is located in Zhuhui District east of the Xiang River. Bajialing Airport has not served commercial flights since 1995, and the new Hengyang Nanyue Airport was opened in December 2014 to serve as Hengyang's civil airport.

== History ==
The airport was built in September 1929. During World War II, it was the largest airport in southern China under Allied control, and in 1944 was a major battleground of the Defense of Hengyang, a fierce battle fought between the Imperial Japanese Army and China's National Revolutionary Army.

After the war, Hengyang Airport briefly served civil flights in 1955. It was expanded in 1986, and it served commercial flights again between 1988 and 1995; however, all flights ceased in November 1995.

== See also ==
- List of airports in China
- List of the busiest airports in China
