= Juneyao Air =

Airline of China

Juneyao Air 吉祥航空

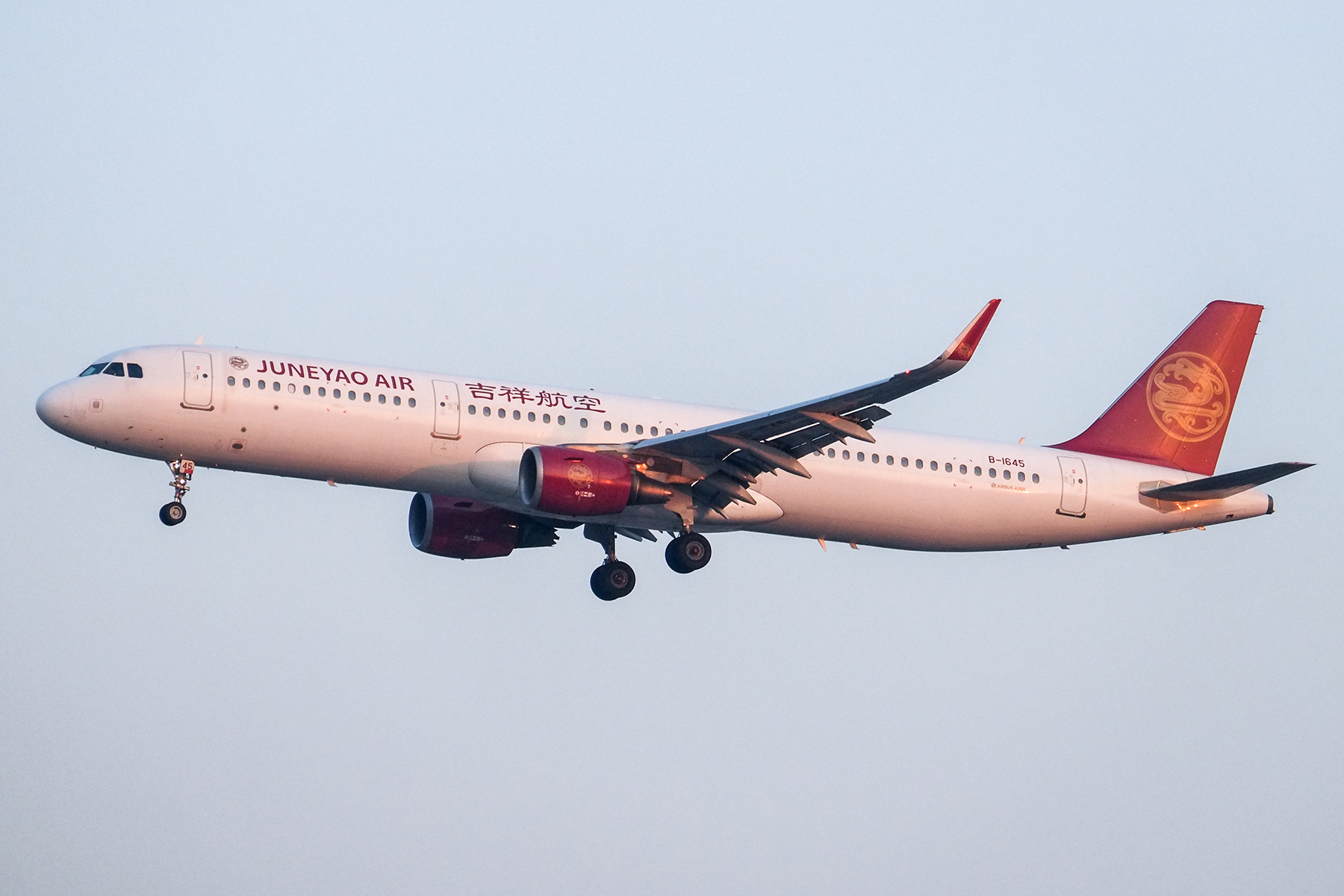
- Juneyao Air Airbus A321-200
IATA	ICAO	Call sign
HO	DKH	AIR JUNEYAO
- Founded: 30 June 2005; 21 years ago
- Commenced operations: 25 September 2006; 20 years ago
- Hubs: Shanghai–Hongqiao; Shanghai–Pudong
- Secondary hubs: Beijing–Daxing; Nanjing
- Frequent-flyer program: Juneyao Air Club
- Alliance: Star Alliance (connecting partner)
- Subsidiaries: 9 Air
- Fleet size: 105 (As of October 2026)
- Destinations: 99
- Parent company: Juneyao Group
- Traded as: SSE: 603885
- Headquarters: Pudong, Shanghai
- Key people: Cheng Ji Yu (general manager & CEO); Jun Jin Wang (Chairman)
- Website: global.juneyaoair.com

Juneyao Airlines Co. Ltd.
- Chinese: 上海吉祥航空股份公司
Transcriptions
Standard Mandarin
- Hanyu Pinyin: Shànghǎi Jíxiáng Hángkōng Gǔfèn Gōngsī
- Wade–Giles: Shang^{4}-hai^{3} Chi^{2}-hsiang^{2} Hang^{2}-k'ung^{1} Ku^{3}-fên^{4} K'ung^{1}-ssŭ^{1}

Juneyao Air (Chinese: 吉祥航空; pinyin: Jíxiáng Hángkōng; lit. 'Auspicious Airlines'; formerly known as Juneyao Airlines) is an airline headquartered in Pudong, Shanghai, China.

The airline operates both domestic and international services from two Shanghai airports (Hongqiao and Pudong). The company was founded in 2005 as a subsidiary of Shanghai JuneYao (Group) Co., Ltd, and started operations in September 2006. It reported a net profit of about CNY1.05 billion ($161.3 million) in 2015. The airline entered the automotive segment in 2023 by creating the JuneYao Auto branch. To begin the vehicle development and production, Juneyao Air acquired the financially troubled Yudo startup.

== History ==
Juneyao Air was founded in 2005 (as Junyao Airlines). In March 2006, the airline ordered 2 Airbus A319 and 6 Airbus A320 aircraft with 3 aircraft (2 Airbus A319 and 1 Airbus A320) to be delivered that same year under a lease agreement with GECAS. The first aircraft, an Airbus A319, was delivered in September, and services commenced on 25 September. Before services commenced, Junyao Airlines rebranded to "Juneyao Airlines" after deciding against the name "Phoenix Airlines".

In September 2006, Juneyao Air launched first commercial flight.

In early 2010, Juneyao Airlines's parent company, Juneyao Group, sold its 71.4% stake in Okay Airways to Datian Wu Liu, in order to concentrate on Juneyao Airlines. By 2014, due to a large number of low cost carriers entering China, Juneyao Airlines applied to launch a low cost carrier subsidiary, 9 Air, to be based in Guangzhou. 9 Air commenced operations in January 2015. In May 2015, Juneyao Air stocks was listed on the Shanghai Stock Exchange Main Board. In September 2016, Juneyao Airlines signed a memorandum of understanding with Boeing for 10 Boeing 787-9 aircraft. At this time, the airline had a fleet of 60 Airbus A320 family aircraft. In January 2017, a firm order for 5 787-9 aircraft (with options for 5 more) was approved, with deliveries scheduled for 2018 and 2019. The airline's first 787 was delivered in October 2018. Initially operating domestic services, Juneyao Airline's 787 aircraft operated its first international flight between Shanghai and Singapore in February 2019. At the start of 2019, China Eastern Air Holding acquired a 7% stake in Juneyao Airlines. In February 2019, the airline applied to operate flights to Vladivostok, Cairo, and London.

In June 2019, Juneyao Air launched an intercontinental flight from Shanghai to Helsinki, making it the first private airline in China using wide-body aircraft to operate an intercontinental flight.

In June 2020, China Eastern Airlines announced the launch of Sanya International Airlines, with Juneyao Airlines to acquire a 15% stake in the airline. At the end of 2020, the airline suffered a loss of CNY 749 million due to the effects of the COVID-19 pandemic. In March 2023, Juneyao Air took delivery of its first Airbus A321neo, assembled locally in Tianjin. In July 2025, it was announced that the airline will be taking over the Singapore-Wuxi route from Jetstar Asia, who will be ceasing operations on 31 July 2025. The route will be serviced using an Airbus A320neo aircraft, and will be flying between the two cities on a four times a week basis starting 29 August 2025.

== Corporate affairs ==
The headquarters are in Pudong.

They were formerly in Changning, Shanghai.

== Destinations ==
As of May 2026, the airlines operates more than 260 domestic and international air routes; connects more than 220 destinations in East Asia, Southeast Asia, Europe and Australia.

=== Alliance ===
- Juneyao Air joined Star Alliance as a Connecting Partner on 23 May 2017.

=== Joint ventures ===
Juneyao Air has the following joint venture agreements (as of October 2025):

- Finnair

=== Codeshare agreements ===
Juneyao Air has the following codeshare agreements (as of October 2025):

- Aegean Airlines
- Air China
- All Nippon Airways
- Asiana Airlines
- China Eastern Airlines
- China Southern Airlines
- EVA Air
- Finnair
- Shenzhen Airlines
- Sichuan Airlines
- Singapore Airlines

=== Interline agreements ===
Juneyao Air has the following interline agreements (as of October 2025):

- Air Canada
- My Freighter Airlines

== Fleet ==
=== Current fleet ===
As of August 2025, Juneyao Air operates the following aircraft:

Juneyao Air fleet
Aircraft	In service	Orders	Passengers			Notes
Aircraft	In service	Orders	J	Y	Total	Notes
Airbus A320-200	30	—	8	156	164	
Airbus A320neo	22	13	8	156	164	
Airbus A321-200	27	—	8	190	198	
Airbus A321neo	14	12	8	199	207	
Boeing 787-9	10	—	29	295	324	Order with 5 options.
Total	103	25				

The airline took delivery of its first Boeing 787 Dreamliner in October 2018. Juneyao Airlines has previously been an all-Airbus operator.

On 29 December 2025, Juneyao Airlines said in its filing to the Shanghai bourse the plan to sign an agreement for buying 25 A320-family jets. Airbus recorded the order in March 2026.

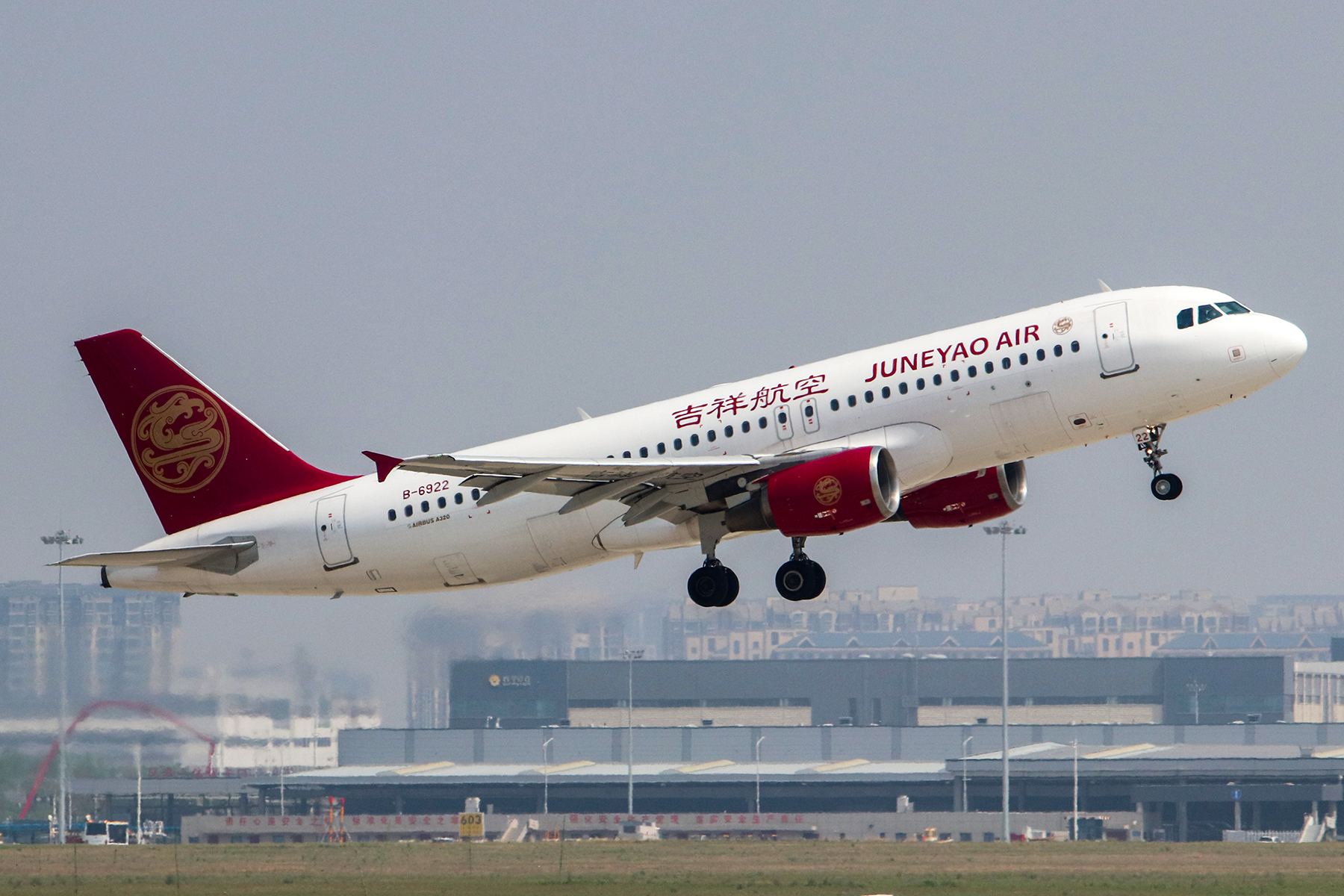
Juneyao Air Airbus A320-200 in 2024

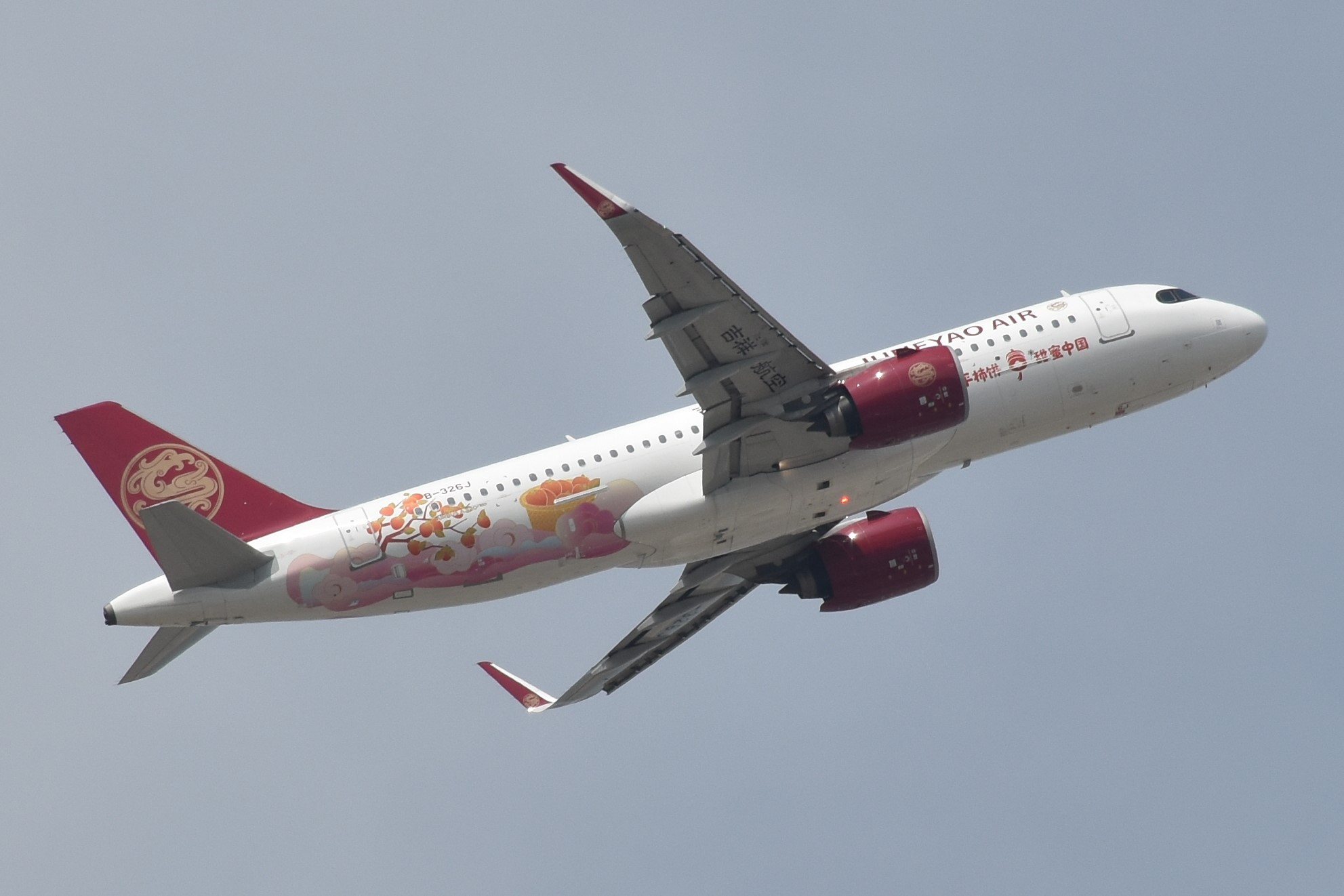
Juneyao Air Airbus A320neo, painted in a special Fuping Dried Persimmon livery in 2023

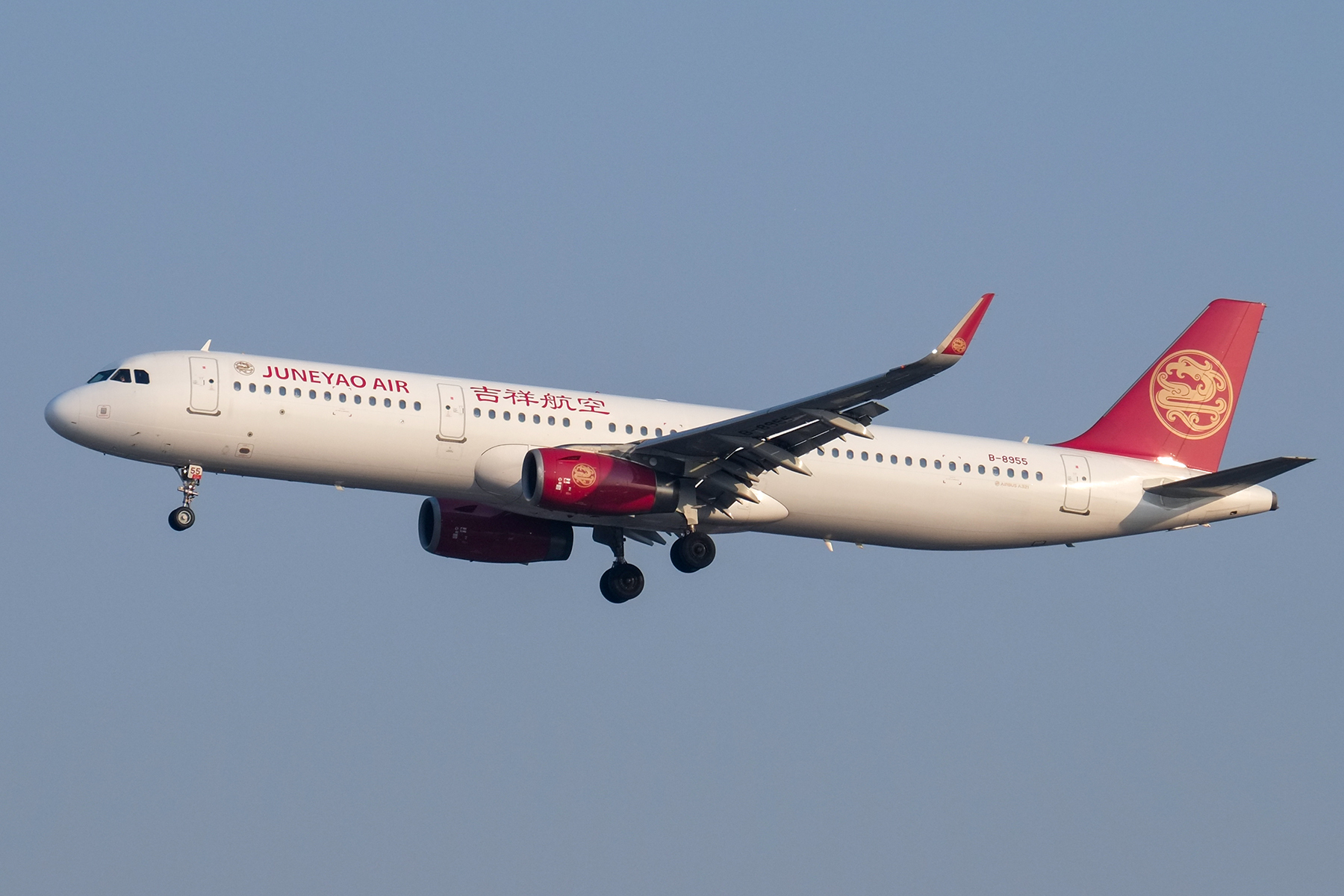
Juneyao Air Airbus A321-200 in 2024

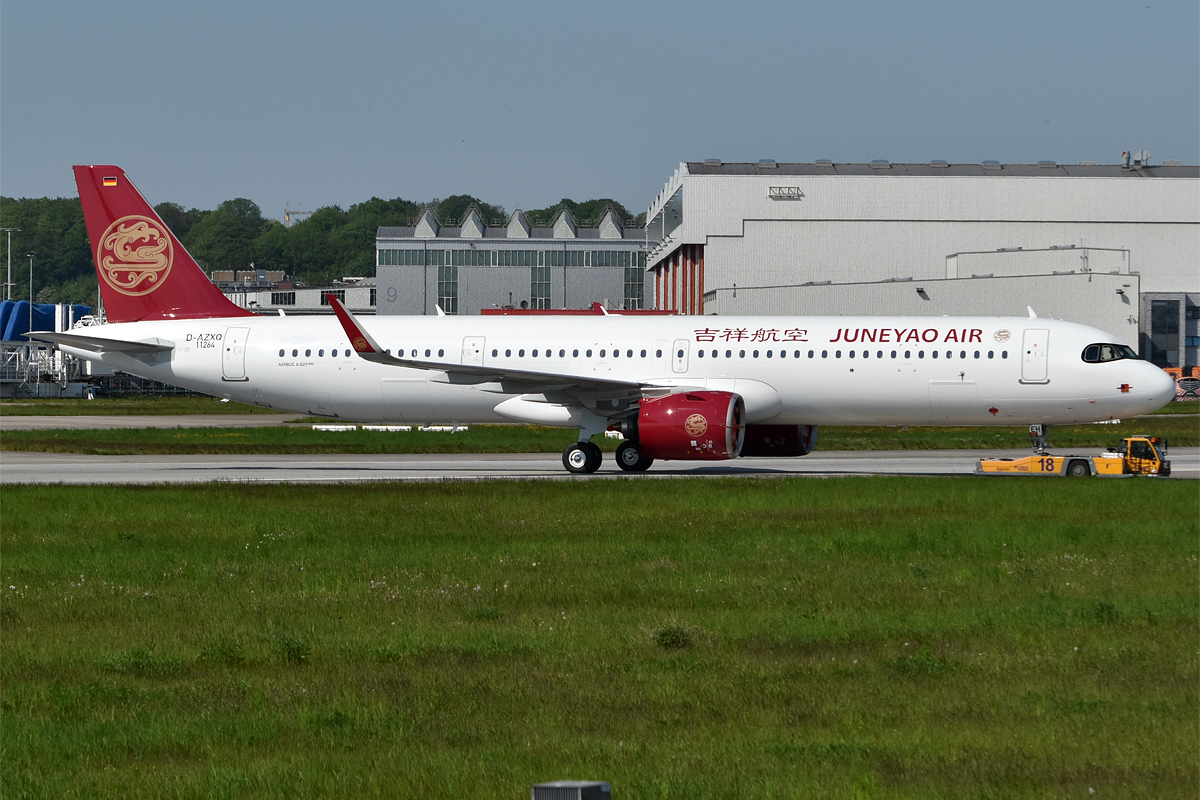
Juneyao Air Airbus A321neo in 2023

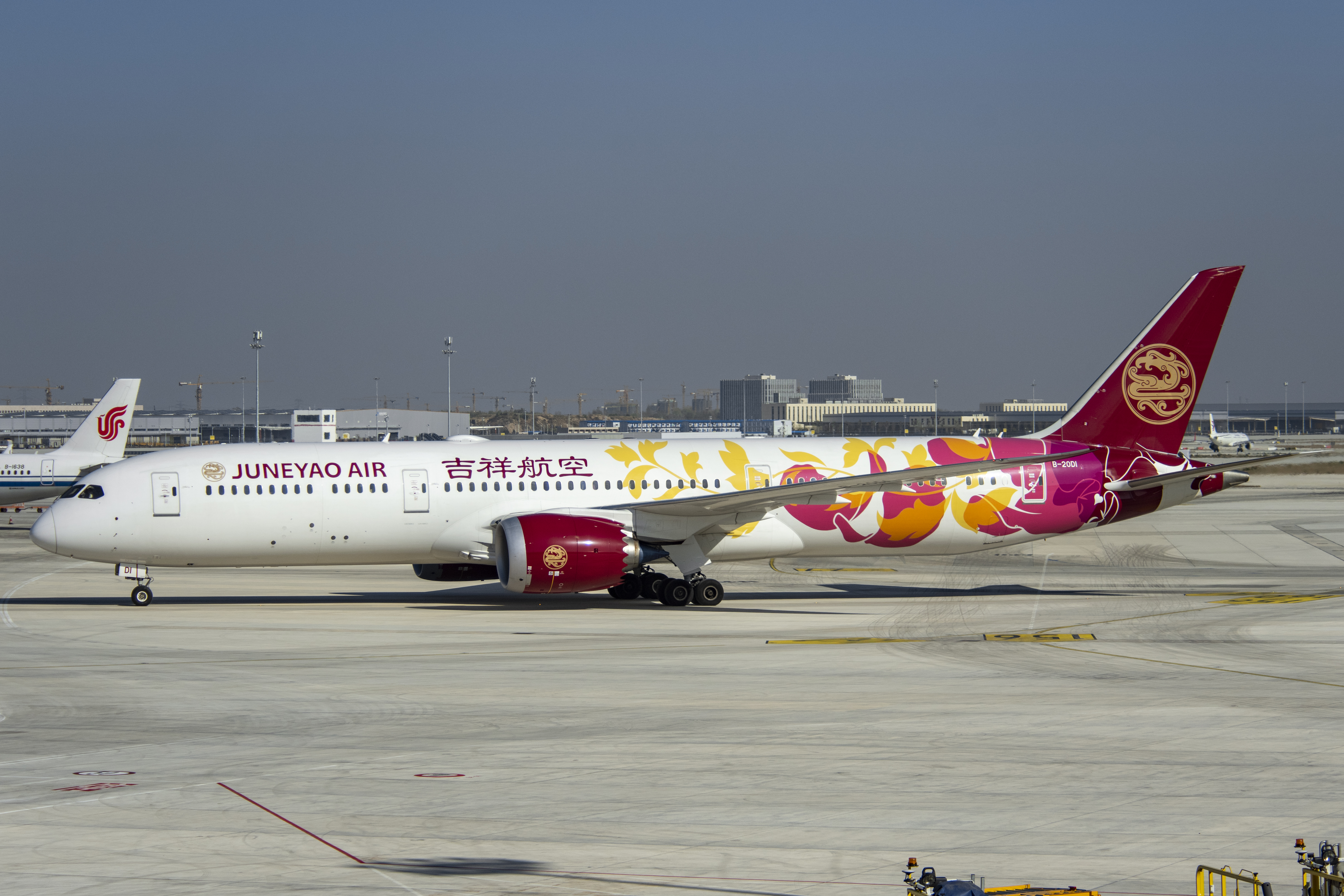
A Boeing 787-9 of Juneyao Air painted in a special Colorful Floral livery

=== Former fleet ===
- 2 Airbus A319-100s
- 13 Airbus A320-200s

== Cabin ==
=== Business class ===
Business class on the Boeing 787-9s consist of leather Thompson Aero Vantage XL seats configured in 1-2-1 configuration. The seats are 22 inches wide and can convert into a 78-inch lie flat bed. The seats are also equipped with a bi-fold tray table including a personal device holder as well as an 18-inch HD touchscreen display and Universal AC and USB-A sockets. On narrow-body aircraft, business class are configured in a 2-2 configuration.

=== Economy class ===
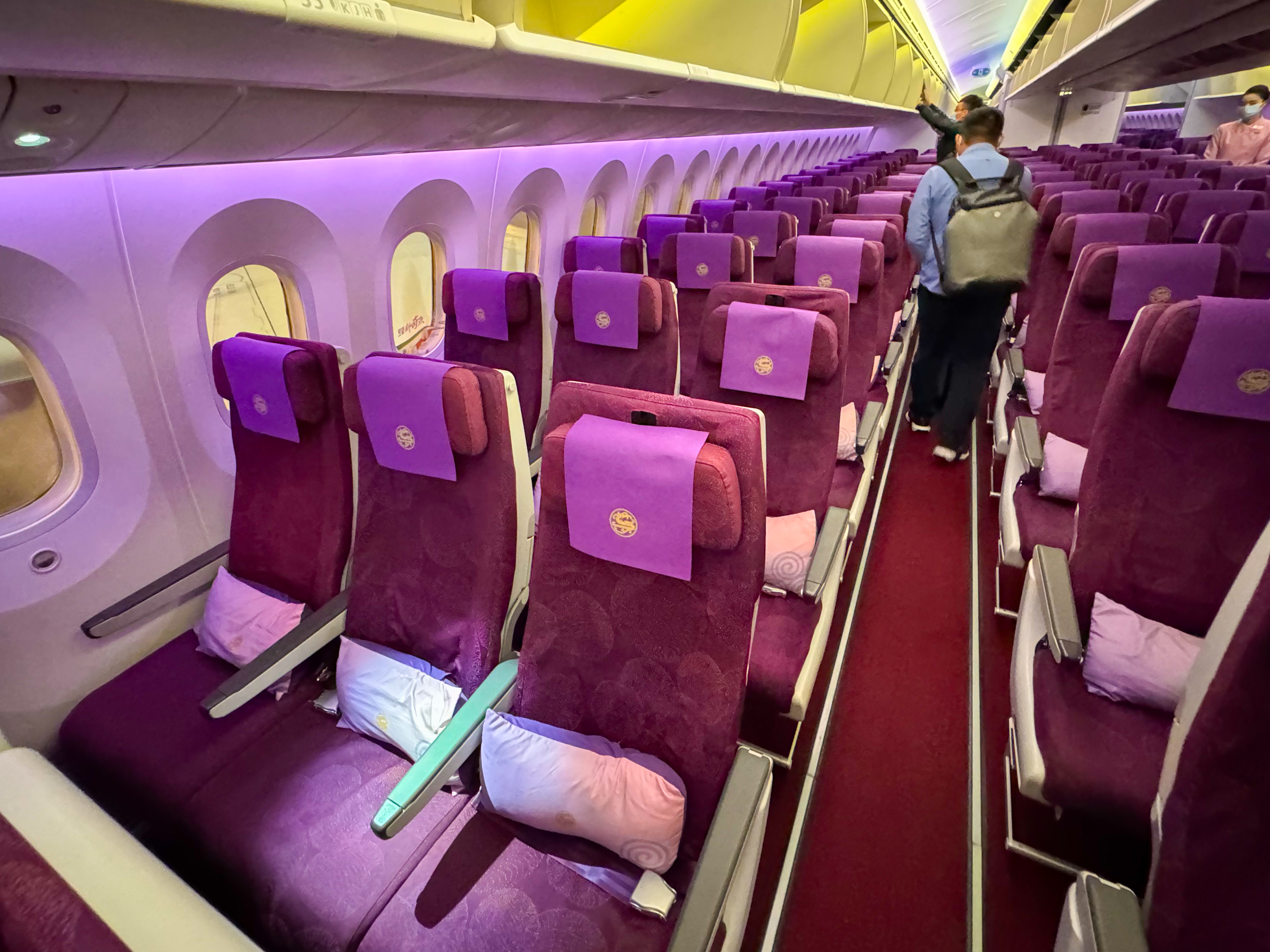
Juneyao Air Boeing 787-9 economy class

On the Boeing 787-9s, economy class consists of Recaro CL3710 seats, with a four way adjustable headrest and bi-fold table, configured in a 3-3-3 configuration. The seats have a row pitch between 31 and 32 inches, and a seat width of 17.1 inches. The seat also comes with a 11.6-inch HD touchscreen display and a USB-A socket. On the Airbus narrow-body aircraft, economy class is configured in a 3-3 configuration and seats come with USB-A sockets.

=== Inflight Wi-Fi ===
Inflight Wi-Fi is available on Boeing 787-9 aircraft.
