= Xiangxi Biancheng Airport =

Xiangxi Biancheng Airport 湘西边城机场
- IATA: DXJ; ICAO: ZGXX

Summary
- Airport type: Public
- Serves: Xiangxi, Hunan, China
- Location: Huayuan County
- Coordinates: 28.4972°N 109.5218°E

Map
- Location of airport in Hunan

Runways
Direction	Length		Surface
Direction	m	ft	Surface
04/22	2,600	8,530	Concrete

Statistics (2025)
- Passengers: 361,027
- Aircraft movements: 3,664
- Cargo (metric tons): 0.9

Xiangxi Biancheng Airport
- Simplified Chinese: 湘西边城机场
- Traditional Chinese: 湘西邊城機場
Transcriptions
Standard Mandarin
- Hanyu Pinyin: Xiāngxī Bianchéng Jīchǎng

Xiangxi Biancheng Airport (IATA: DXJ, ICAO: ZGXX) is an airport serving Xiangxi Tujia and Miao Autonomous Prefecture in Hunan Province, China. It is located in Huayuan County. The airport is a dual-use general aviation and commercial aviation airport.

Construction of the airport started in 2020 with an investment of CNY 1.67 billion. The airport opened on August 18, 2023.

== History ==
In early 2014, the site selection process for Xiangxi Airport officially began. Initially, 12 locations were selected, and ultimately 3 locations were chosen based on suitability. From July 9 to 11, 2014, experts from the Civil Aviation Administration of China conducted on-site inspections of three proposed sites for civil airports in western Hunan. They recommended Laotianping in Huayuan County as the preferred site for the Xiangxi civil airport, which was named Xiangxi Liye Airport and designated as a domestic feeder airport.

On February 10, 2015, the site selection for Xiangxi Liye Airport was approved by the Civil Aviation Administration of China. On October 10, 2016, the State Council and the Central Military Commission approved the construction of Liye Airport in Xiangxi. On July 27, 2017, the National Development and Reform Commission approved the feasibility study report for the construction of a new civil airport in Xiangxi, Hunan Province. The project was designed to handle 300,000 passengers and 450 tons of cargo annually. Major construction included a new 2,600-meter-long and 45-meter-wide runway, equipped with Category I precision approach systems for both primary and secondary landing directions; a 3,000-square-meter terminal building; and an apron with four aircraft stands.

Construction of the airport commenced in August 2018. In January 2022, the airport was formally named as Xiangxi Biancheng Airport by the Civil Aviation Administration of China. On January 7, 2023, a Chinese civil aviation calibration aircraft took off from Xiangxi Biancheng Airport and completed the airport calibration work. On August 18, 2023, Xiangxi Biancheng Airport officially opened to traffic. The inaugural flight was operated by Capital Airlines flight JD5323, a subsidiary of Hainan Airlines. It departed from Beijing Daxing at 7:25 on August 18, 2023, and arrived in Xiangxi at 10:15.

== Facilities ==
The Xiangxi Biancheng Airport terminal building has a floor area of 11,000 square meters and five aircraft parking positions (three boarding bridges). The airport has a 4C flight zone rating and a runway length of 2,600 meters.

== Airlines and destinations ==
Airlines	Destinations
Beijing Capital Airlines	Xi'an
China United Airlines	Beijing–Daxing
Colorful Guizhou Airlines	Ningbo
Ruili Airlines	Kunming, Shenyang
Tianjin Airlines	Chengdu–Tianfu, Quanzhou, Xi'an
West Air	Haikou, Zhengzhou

== See also ==
- List of airports in China
- List of the busiest airports in China
- Zhangjiajie Hehua International Airport
