= Qiannan Libo Airport =

Qiannan Libo Airport 黔南荔波机场
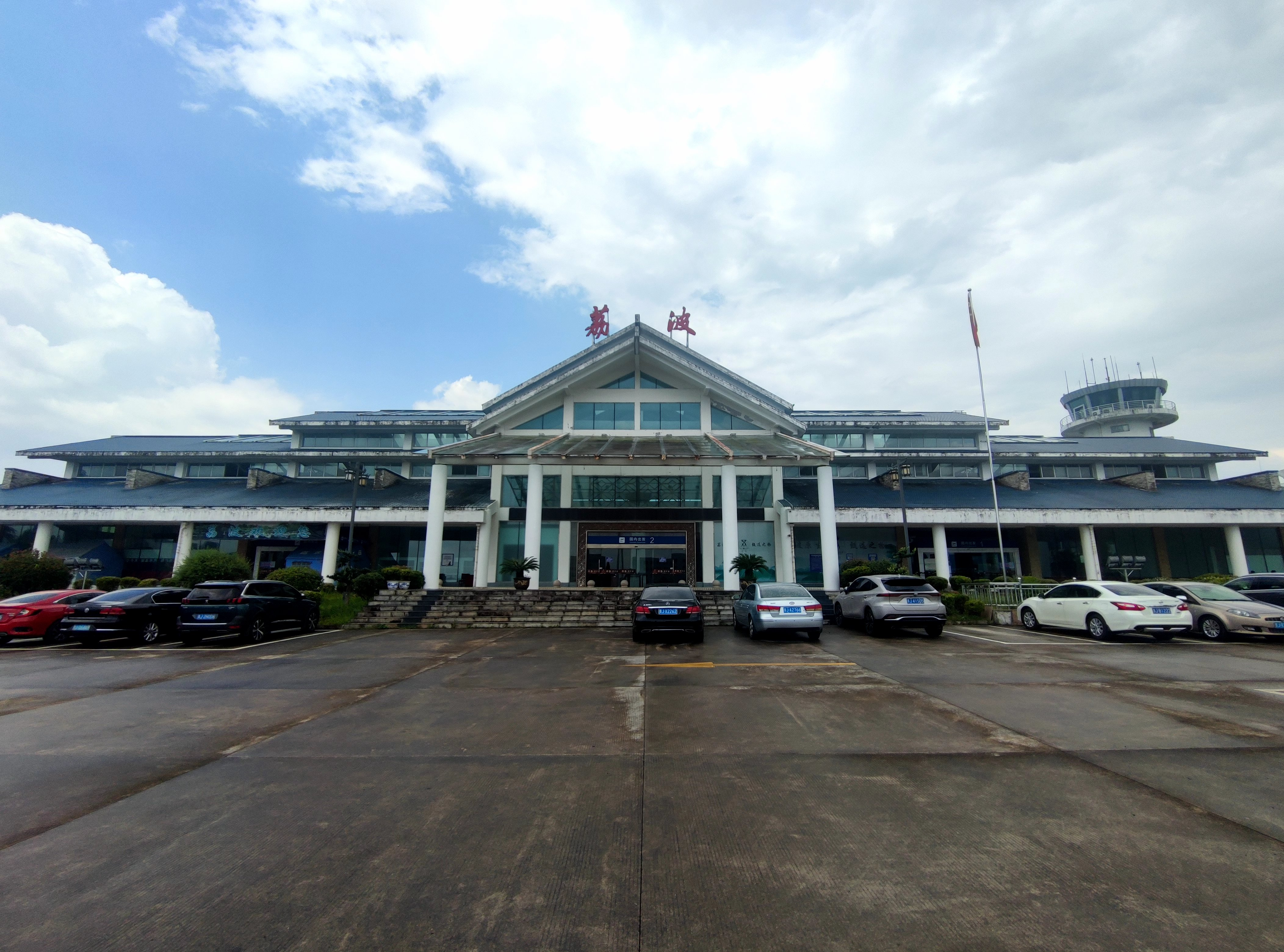
- IATA: LLB; ICAO: ZULB

Summary
- Airport type: Public
- Location: Libo County, Guizhou, China
- Coordinates: 25°27′09″N 107°57′42″E

Map
- Location of airport in Guizhou

Runways
Direction	Length		Surface
Direction	m	ft	Surface
03/21	2,300	7,546

Statistics (2021)
- Passengers: 71,783
- Aircraft movements: 952
- Cargo (metric tons): 2.8

Qiannan Libo Airport
- Simplified Chinese: 黔南荔波机场
- Traditional Chinese: 黔南荔波機場
Transcriptions
Standard Mandarin
- Hanyu Pinyin: Qiánnán Lìbō Jīchǎng

Qiannan Libo Airport (IATA: LLB, ICAO: ZULB) is an airport serving Libo County, Qiannan Buyei and Miao Autonomous Prefecture, Guizhou Province, China. It is formerly called Libo Airport (Chinese: 荔波机场) until December 2020. Construction for the airport started in July 2003 and was completed in September 2007 at a total cost of 390 million yuan. However, since its opening the airport has been plagued by the lack of flights and passengers, handling only 151 passengers in all of 2009.

== Airlines and destinations ==
Airlines	Destinations
Air Chang'an	Xi'an, Zhuhai
Colorful Guizhou Airlines	Guiyang, Hefei, Nanchang, Taizhou, Tongren, Xingyi

== See also ==
- List of airports in China
- List of the busiest airports in China
