= Xingyi Wanfenglin Airport =

Xingyi Wanfenglin Airport 兴义万峰林机场
- IATA: ACX; ICAO: ZUYI

Summary
- Airport type: Public
- Serves: Xingyi, Guizhou, China
- Opened: 2004
- Coordinates: 25°05′18″N 104°57′31″E

Map
- Location of airport in Guizhou

Runways
| Direction | Length | | Surface |
| Direction | m | ft | Surface |
|---|---|---|---|
| 16/34 | 2,300 | 7,546 |

Statistics (2025)
- Passengers: 1,466,421
- Aircraft movements: 17,598
- Cargo (metric tons): 2,501.7

Xingyi Wanfenglin Airport
- Simplified Chinese: 兴义万峰林机场
- Traditional Chinese: 興義萬峰林機場
Transcriptions
Standard Mandarin
- Hanyu Pinyin: Xìngyì Wànfēnglín Jīchǎng

Xingyi Wanfenglin Airport (IATA: ACX, ICAO: ZUYI) is a class 3C airport serving the city of Xingyi in Guizhou Province, China. It was opened in 2004. The airport is located 7 kilometers from the city center, and 15 kilometers from Wanfenglin National Geopark. Originally called Xingyi Airport, in April 2014 it was renamed Xingyi Wanfenglin Airport.

== History ==
On August 15, 2000, the feasibility study report for Xingyi Airport was approved by the State Council; seven days later, on August 23, the airport project was officially approved by the State Council; on September 22, the State Council and the Central Military Commission jointly approved the construction of the new Xingyi civilian airport. During this period, a series of tasks were completed, including site selection, geological survey, pre-feasibility study, preparation and evaluation of the feasibility study report, environmental impact assessment, soil and water conservation plan, geological hazard risk assessment and approval, preliminary design demonstration, investment budget, land acquisition, forest land occupation, timber harvesting, resettlement, and pilot section construction. Finally, on December 28, 2000, the airport project officially commenced construction, with an estimated investment of 363.84 million yuan (including 223.76 million yuan from central government bonds, 111.88 million yuan from civil aviation special funds, and 28.2 million yuan from local matching funds). Due to foundation treatment, process adjustments, and some design changes, the total investment in the airport project will exceed 400 million yuan.

The airport took about three years to build. At 9:05 AM on July 18, 2004, Xingyi Airport officially opened to traffic as a China Eastern Airlines CRJ-200 aircraft that took off from Kunming Wujiaba Airport landed at Xingyi Airport.

Although Xingyi Airport was originally built as a regional 4C‑class airport and opened to traffic in 2004, its early years saw only a limited number of routes to nearby hubs such as Guiyang, Kunming, and Chongqing. However, as Qianxinan Prefecture's tourism sector expanded and external exchanges increased, the airport's original facilities gradually became insufficient for the growing demand and for the operational requirements of mainstream aircraft types. This capacity constraint limited the introduction of new routes. In 2012, the Xingyi Airport Master Plan (2012 Edition) was approved by the Civil Aviation Administration of China, and later that year the preliminary feasibility study for the airport's first-phase reconstruction and expansion project passed evaluation and was submitted to the National Development and Reform Commission for approval.

The expansion project included extending the runway 500 meters southward to a total length of 2,800 meters, enabling the airport to accommodate aircraft such as the B737‑800, B737‑700, A320, CRJ‑200, and ERJ‑190; adding a vertical connecting road to the south of the original connecting road and adding 4 apron for a total of 7 aircraft seats; building supporting production, office, and living service facilities. The total investment of the project is 635 million yuan, and the funding sources are from national subsidy funds and local government self-raised funds. On October 28, 2014, the airport reconstruction and expansion project officially started construction.

On May 5, 2016, it passed the industry acceptance of the Civil Aviation Southwest Regional Administration, and completed the flight calibration and test flight of performance-based navigation (PBN) flight procedures and traditional flight procedures. The handover to the reconstruction and expansion headquarters was completed on May 30, 2016. After the reconstruction of Xingyi Airport, it was renamed Xingyi Wanfenglin Airport and the number of routes increased significantly. The airport operated flights not only to Guiyang, Kunming, Guangzhou, and Chongqing, but also to major cities including Beijing, Shanghai, Chengdu, Nanning, Sanya, Guilin, Xiamen, and others, restoring and adding multiple domestic connections as part of its long‑term development plan. On July 21, 2016, the first phase of reconstruction and expansion was fully put into operation. In November, the construction of the second phase of reconstruction and expansion began, with a new T2 terminal and related supporting facilities.

On August 18, 2018, Xingyi Wanfenglin Airport T2 terminal was officially put into operation. This phase of the airport terminal and supporting facilities reconstruction and expansion project included a new 15,298-square-meter terminal, four boarding bridges and other equipment and facilities. At the same time, 1,000 square meters of the T1 terminal was also renovated. After the renovation, the building area of the cargo warehouse was increased to 1,300 square meters; the new parking lot was increased to 8,150 square meters; three aprons and a vertical connecting taxiway were also added.

== Airlines and destinations ==
| Airlines | Destinations |
|---|---|
| 9 Air | Nanjing, Wenzhou |
| China Eastern Airlines | Shanghai–Pudong |
| China Express Airlines | Beihai, Chongqing |
| China Southern Airlines | Guangzhou |
| China United Airlines | Beijing–Daxing |
| Colorful Guizhou Airlines | Bijie, Chengdu–Tianfu, Fuzhou, Guiyang, Hefei, Libo, Nanchang, Ningbo, Shenzhen, Tongren, Wuhan, Xi'an, Zhuhai, Zunyi–Xinzhou |
| Okay Airways | Chongqing, Haikou, Hangzhou, Xishuangbanna |
| Tianjin Airlines | Guiyang, Huizhou |

== See also ==
- List of airports in China
- List of the busiest airports in China
