= Tongren Fenghuang Airport =

Tongren Fenghuang Airport 铜仁凤凰机场
- IATA: TEN; ICAO: ZUTR

Summary
- Airport type: Public
- Serves: Tongren and Fenghuang
- Location: Songtao County, Tongren, Guizhou, China
- Elevation AMSL: 705 m (2,313 ft)
- Coordinates: 27°53′00″N 109°18′32″E

Map
- Location in Guizhou TEN/ZUTR (China)

Runways
Direction	Length		Surface
Direction	m	ft	Surface
04/22	2,750	9,022	Asphalt

Statistics (2025)
- Passengers: 604,944
- Aircraft movements: 5,734
- Cargo (metric tons): 338.9

Tongren Fenghuang Airport
- Simplified Chinese: 铜仁凤凰机场
- Traditional Chinese: 銅仁鳳凰機場
Transcriptions
Standard Mandarin
- Hanyu Pinyin: Tóngrén Fènghuáng Jīchǎng

Tongren Fenghuang Airport (IATA: TEN, ICAO: ZUTR) is an airport serving the city of Tongren in Guizhou Province, China. It is located in Daxing Subdistrict in Songtao Miao Autonomous County, 21 kilometers from Tongren and 34 kilometers from Fenghuang, a popular tourist destination in neighboring Hunan Province. The airport was opened in 2001. Originally called Tongren Daxing Airport (铜仁大兴机场), it was renamed in October 2009.

== History ==
Construction of Tongren Fenghuang Airport (then named Tongren Daxing Airport) began in 1958, but was suspended several times due to the Cultural Revolution.

The airport was completed at the end of March 1971 and officially opened to traffic on April 20, 1972. The airport runway was a concrete-gravel runway, 1,500 meters long and 40 meters wide.

In 1981, Daxing Airport was forced to close due to insufficient passenger and cargo traffic, making it unsustainable.

In 1997, Tongren Prefecture invested 163 million yuan to expand the airport, mainly for B737-300 passenger planes, with a 4C flight zone rating, a 2,000-meter runway, and a terminal building with a floor area of 2,415 square meters. The airport reopened in July 2001.

On July 21, 2001, the renovation and expansion works were completed and the airport officially resumed operation.

In October 2009, with the approval of the Civil Aviation Administration of China, Tongren Daxing Airport was renamed Tongren Fenghuang Airport.

For a long time, Tongren Airport had suffered from inadequate facilities, mainly due to its short runway, which couldn't meet the needs of mainstream aircraft types. In August 2009, the Tongren Airport expansion project was launched. The main project was to extend the runway northward by 600 meters to 2600 meters, constructing a new 136.5-meter-long and 18-meter-wide perpendicular taxiway, relocating the existing North Terminal, renovating the existing terminal building, and increasing the number of aprons from two to four, with a total investment of 429 million RMB. After the expansion is completed, it is projected that by 2020, the airport's annual passenger throughput would reach 800,000, and its annual cargo throughput would reach 1200 tons. In 2025, the airport's actual passenger throughput was 604,944 and its cargo throughput was 338.9 metric tons, both figures far below the target.

== Accidents ==
On 5 January 1960, a fire broke out at the Tongren Airport (under-construction), killing 175 and injuring 5. This is the deadliest airport fire in China.

== Airlines and destinations ==
Airlines	Destinations
Air Chang'an	Xiamen, Xi'an
Air Guilin	Haikou, Zhengzhou
Air Travel	Kunming, Nanjing, Wenzhou, Wuxi
China Express Airlines	Guiyang
China United Airlines	Beijing–Daxing
Colorful Guizhou Airlines	Bijie, Guiyang, Hefei, Libo, Nanchang, Xingyi, Zhuhai
Juneyao Air	Shanghai–Pudong

== See also ==
- List of airports in China
- List of the busiest airports in China
