= Anyang Airport =

- IATA: AYN; ICAO: ZHAY

Summary
- Airport type: Military, former public
- Serves: Anyang, Henan, China
- Coordinates: 36°08′02″N 114°20′38″E

Map
- Location of airport in Henan

Runways
Direction	Length		Surface
Direction	m	ft	Surface
01L/19R	1,020	3,346	concrete
01R/19L	1,020	3,346	concrete
- Source: GCM, STV

Anyang Airport
- Traditional Chinese: 安陽機場
- Simplified Chinese: 安阳机场
Transcriptions
Standard Mandarin
- Hanyu Pinyin: Ānyáng Jīchǎng

Anyang Airport (IATA: AYN, ICAO: ZHAY) is a military airport in the city of Anyang in Henan Province, China.

== Passenger ==
Airlines	Destinations
Beijing Capital Airlines	Harbin, Sanya
China Southern Airlines	Guangzhou, Shenzhen
Ruili Airlines	Chengdu–Tianfu, Shenyang
Suparna Airlines	Shanghai–Pudong

== See also ==
- List of airports in China
- List of the busiest airports in China
