= BFJ =

BFJ may refer to:

- IATA code for Bijie Feixiong Airport
- Battle Fever J, a Japanese TV series
- Bund freier Jugend, former Austrian Neonazi group
