= Ningbo Lishe International Airport =

Airport serving Ningbo, Zhejiang, China

Ningbo Lishe International Airport 宁波栎社国际机场

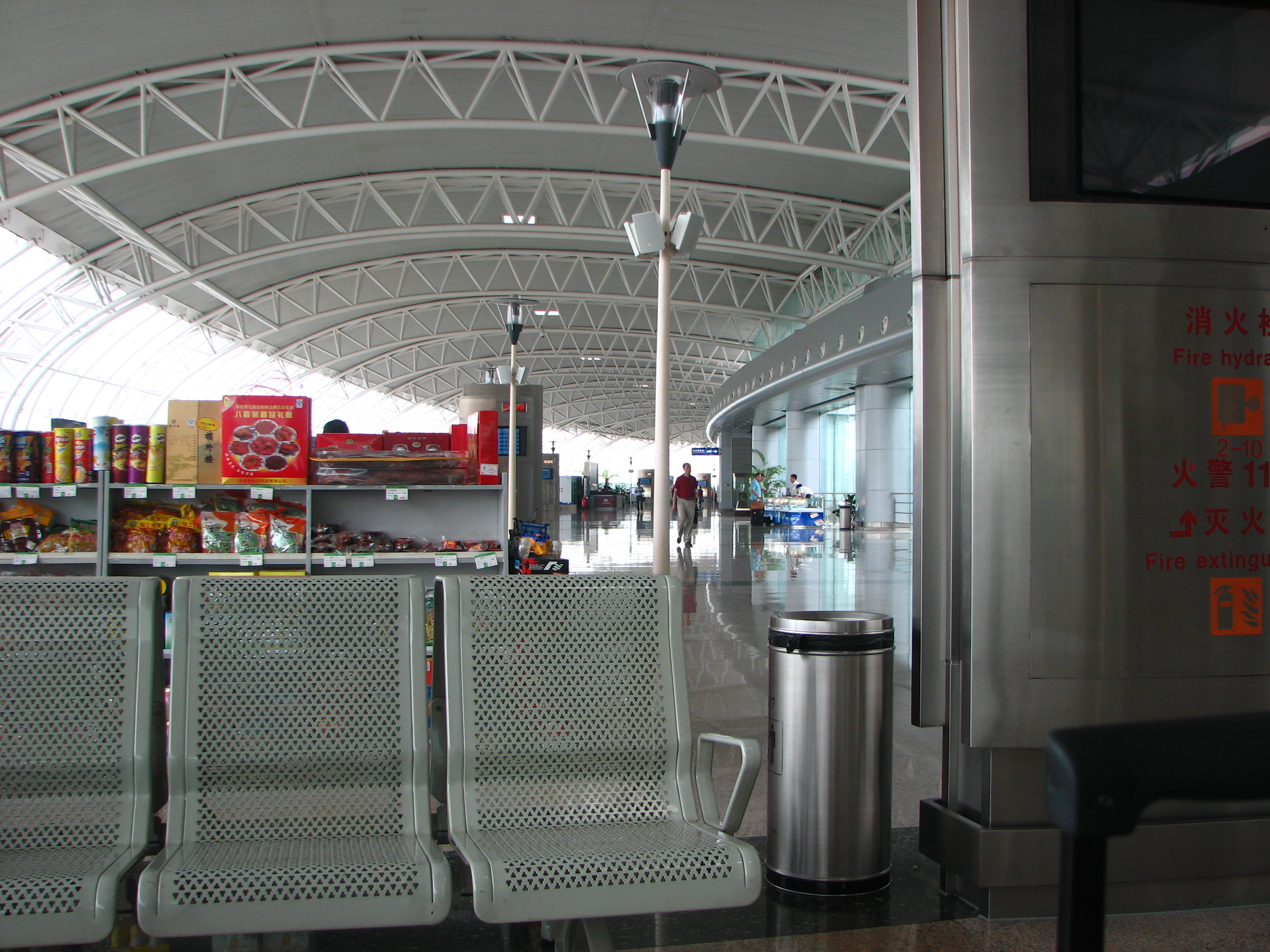
- IATA: NGB; ICAO: ZSNB

Summary
- Airport type: Public
- Operator: Ningbo Lishe International Airport Co. Ltd.
- Serves: Ningbo
- Location: Haishu District, Ningbo, Zhejiang, China
- Opened: 30 June 1990; 36 years ago
- Focus city for: China Eastern Airlines
- Elevation AMSL: 4 m (13 ft)
- Coordinates: 29°49′36″N 121°27′43″E
- Website: www.nbairport.com

Maps
- CAAC airport chart
- Location in Zhejiang Location in China

Runways
Direction	Length		Surface
Direction	m	ft	Surface
13/31	3,200	10,499	Concrete

Statistics (2025)
- Passengers: 16,125,459 ▲9.4%
- Aircraft movements: 113,483 ▲4.4%
- Cargo: 160,124.2 ▼5.0%

Ningbo Lishe International Airport
- Simplified Chinese: 宁波栎社国际机场
- Traditional Chinese: 寧波櫟社國際機場
Transcriptions
Standard Mandarin
- Hanyu Pinyin: Níngbō Lìshè Guójì Jīchǎng

Ningbo Lishe International Airport (IATA: NGB, ICAO: ZSNB) is an international airport serving Ningbo, a major city in the Yangtze River Delta region and the second largest city in East China's Zhejiang Province.

In 2025, the airport handled 16.1 million passengers, ranking 30th in China. It was the 27th busiest airport in China by cargo traffic in 2025.

== History ==
Ningbo's Lishe was an auxiliary air force base of the Republic-era Chinese Nationalist Air Force, and was the final launching point of Martin B-10 bombers commanded by Captain Xu Huansheng and Lieutenant Tong Yanbo of the 14th Bomber Squadron of the 8th Bomber Group in their famous transoceanic raid to Nagasaki and other cities in the Empire of Japan on 19–20 May 1938.

In 1985, the Central Government of China approved the construction of Ningbo Lishe Airport. On 30 June 1990, it was opened to the public and became the first civil-only airport in Zhejiang. The construction cost was RMB 126 million.

In July 1992, the airport opened for international service with direct flights to Hong Kong. In November 1998, service to Macau with onward code-share connection to Taipei and Kaohsiung started. International cargo flights started by the end of 1998.

In March 1997, Great Wall Airlines established a hub at the facility. The airport had services to 38 domestic destinations in China and international services to Hong Kong, Seoul, and Macau. It was served by 16 airlines.

On 8 October 2002, the T1 Terminal of Ningbo Lishe Airport commenced operations.

It was renamed to Ningbo Lishe International Airport on 29 November 2005.

On 8 February 2006, the flight area expansion was completed.

On 2 December 2015, the third phase of the project started in full.

On 29 December 2019, the T2 terminal of Ningbo Lishe International Airport was officially transferred and opened, and the T1 terminal was closed simultaneously

On 8 April 2022, the T1 terminal renovation project of Ningbo Lishe International Airport officially started.

On 22 December 2023, the T1 terminal of Ningbo Lishe International Airport was officially reopened.

In 2025, Ningbo Lishe International Airport reported 1.071 million cross-border passenger traffic, 21.6% up from 2024.

=== Growth ===
The airport is one of the fastest growing in China. In 1992, 286,021 passengers and 4,064 tons of cargo passed through the airport. In 2002, the figures grew to 1.28 million passengers and over 20,000 tons of cargo. Annual growth rate is 17.8% and 19.8% for passenger traffic and cargo traffic respectively.

In 2004, the airport handled 1.85 million passengers and 34,800 tons of cargo. It was expected to handle 2.3 million passengers and 52,000 tons of cargo in 2008.

As of February 2026, the airport has 81 domestic destinations and 12 international destinations, and is served by over 40 airlines.

== Facilities ==
A new passenger terminal was opened on 8 October 2002 at a construction cost of RMB 770 million with an annual capacity of 3.8 million passengers. It can handle 1,700 passengers at maximum per hour. The departure lounge occupies 43,500 m^{2}. The new apron occupies an area of 87,000 m^{2}. The new terminal has 16 departure gates and seven jetways. The new parking facility associated has 360 parking spaces.

== Airlines and destinations ==
=== Passenger ===
Airlines	Destinations
9 Air	Changchun, Guiyang, Harbin
Air Chang'an	Guiyang, Jingdezhen, Xi'an
Air China	Beijing–Capital, Beijing–Daxing, Chengdu–Shuangliu, Chengdu–Tianfu, Chongqing, Guangzhou
Air Macau	Macau
Air Travel	Changsha
Batik Air	Charter: Manado
Beijing Capital Airlines	Dali
Cathay Pacific	Hong Kong
Chengdu Airlines	Chengdu–Shuangliu
China Eastern Airlines	Beijing–Daxing, Changbaishan, Changsha, Chengdu–Tianfu, Chongqing, Dalian, Guangzhou, Guilin, Guiyang, Harbin, Ho Chi Minh City, Hong Kong, Jieyang, Kunming, Kuqa, Nanning, Nanchang, Qingdao, Shenyang, Shenzhen, Singapore, Taipei–Taoyuan, Taiyuan, Wuhan, Xi'an, Xining, Xishuangbanna, Zhengzhou, Zhuhai
China Express Airlines	Chongqing, Jingzhou, Lianyungang
China Southern Airlines	Beijing–Daxing, Changsha, Dalian, Guangzhou, Guiyang, Harbin, Jieyang, Nanning, Shenyang, Shenzhen, Ürümqi, Wuhan
China United Airlines	Beijing–Daxing
Chongqing Airlines	Chongqing, Guangzhou
Colorful Guizhou Airlines	Bijie, Chengdu–Tianfu, Chongqing, Guiyang, Huizhou, Jiujiang, Luzhou, Wanzhou, Xiangxi, Xichang, Xingyi, Yibin, Yueyang
Donghai Airlines	Zunyi–Xinzhou
Hainan Airlines	Changchun, Changsha, Dalian, Guangzhou, Haikou, Qingdao, Shenzhen, Tianjin, Ürümqi, Wuhan, Zhengzhou
Hebei Airlines	Beijing–Daxing
HK Express	Hong Kong
Lao Airlines	Vientiane
LJ Air	Changsha, Linfen, Xishuangbanna, Zhanjiang
Loong Air	Bazhong, Changchun, Chongqing, Enshi, Ganzhou, Guangyuan, Guiyang, Harbin, Kashgar, Lijiang, Luzhou, Mangshi, Qingdao, Shenyang, Weihai, Xi'an, Xiangyang, Yinchuan, Zhuhai
Lucky Air	Guiyang, Kunming, Lijiang, Xishuangbanna, Yichang, Zunyi–Maotai
Okay Airways	Xi'an
Qingdao Airlines	Harbin, Nanning, Qingdao, Weihai
Royal Air Philippines	Charter: Caticlan
Ruili Airlines	Kunming
Shandong Airlines	Haikou, Qingdao, Ürümqi, Zhengzhou, Zhuhai
Shanghai Airlines	Budapest, Changchun, Shanghai–Pudong, Yantai
Shenzhen Airlines	Harbin, Linyi, Shenzhen, Yuncheng
Sichuan Airlines	Chengdu–Shuangliu, Chengdu–Tianfu, Chongqing, Kunming, Sanya, Tianjin, Xichang
Spring Airlines	Bangkok–Suvarnabhumi, Changchun, Chongqing, Dalian, Guangzhou, Guilin, Guiyang, Harbin, Jeju, Jieyang, Jinggangshan, Kaohsiung, Kunming, Lanzhou, Mianyang, Nanning, Phuket (resumes 18 December 2026), Qingdao, Sanya, Shenyang, Shenzhen, Shijiazhuang, Shiyan, Tianjin, Ürümqi, Xi'an, Zhuhai
Spring Japan	Tokyo–Narita
Tianjin Airlines	Dalian, Yantai
Urumqi Air	Zhengzhou
VietJet Air	Seasonal charter: Phu Quoc
XiamenAir	Changchun, Xiamen

=== Cargo ===
Airlines	Destinations
Central Airlines	Osaka–Kansai
China Cargo Airlines	Amsterdam
Hong Kong Air Cargo	Hong Kong
Longhao Airlines	Manila, Osaka–Kansai
Qantas Freight	Hobart
YTO Cargo Airlines	Seoul-Incheon

== Ground transportation ==
Free bus service between the airport and Lishe International Airport Station is available every 10 minutes. There are limousine airport buses to downtown Ningbo every hour. There are buses to prefectures farther away from Ningbo with less frequency.

== Accidents and incidents ==
- On 7 August 2023, a Kalitta Air Boeing 747-481F (N401KZ), operating from Anchorage to Ningbo, suffered a runway excursion upon landing at the airport. There have been no injuries reported from the incident. The incident resulted in the closure of the airport with arriving flights already airborne diverting, while the remainder of flights departing from the airport on the day canceled.

== See also ==
- List of airports in the People's Republic of China
- List of the busiest airports in the People's Republic of China
