= Anyang Hongqiqu Airport =

Anyang Hongqiqu Airport 安阳红旗渠机场
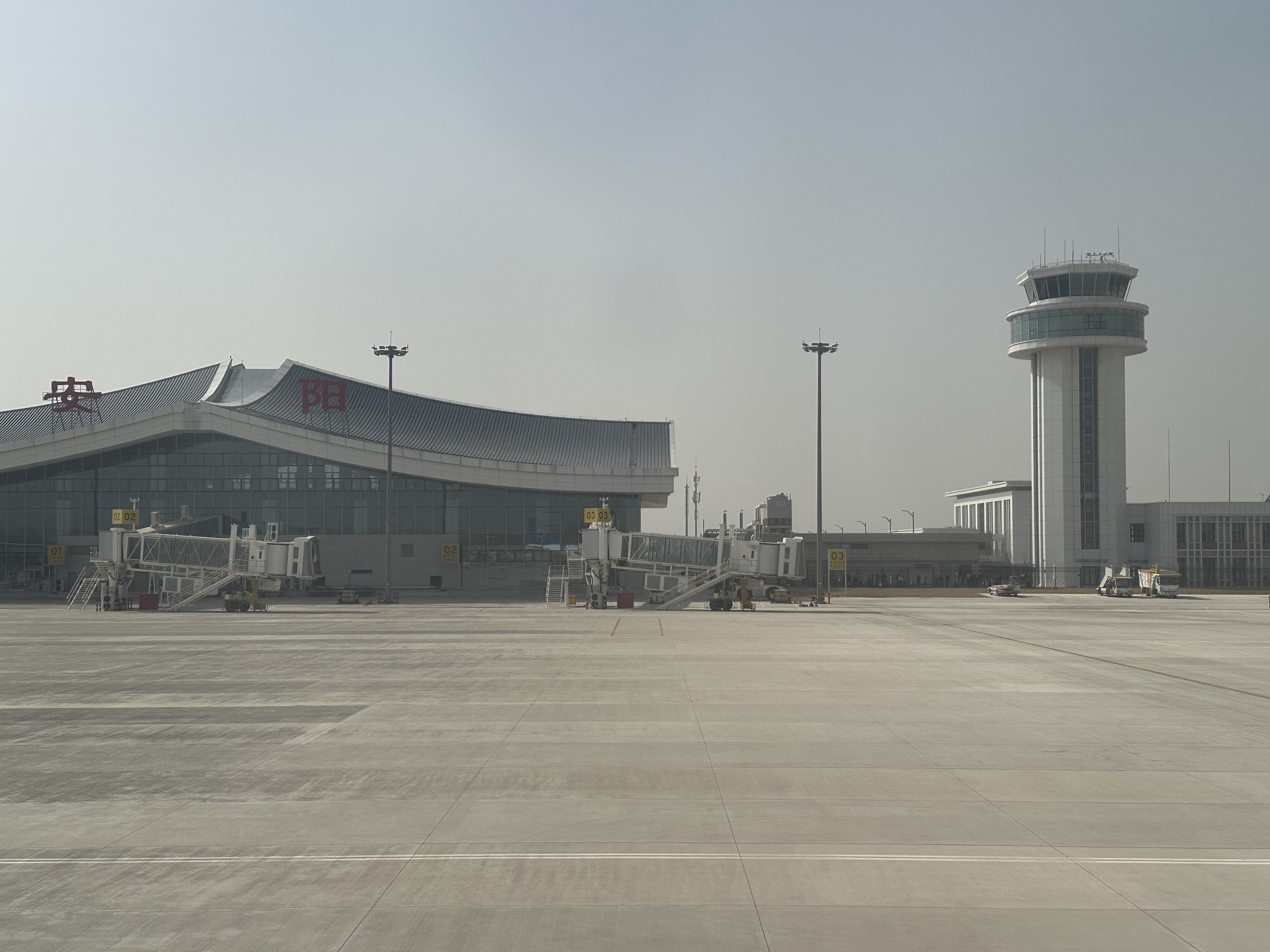
- IATA: HQQ; ICAO: ZHQQ

Summary
- Airport type: Public
- Serves: Anyang, Henan, China
- Coordinates: 35°52′15″N 114°27′43″E

Map
- Location of airport in Henan

Runways
Direction	Length		Surface
Direction	m	ft	Surface
03/21	2,600	8,530

Anyang Hongqiqu Airport
- Simplified Chinese: 安阳红旗渠机场
- Traditional Chinese: 安陽紅旗渠機場
Transcriptions
Standard Mandarin
- Hanyu Pinyin: Ānyáng Hóngqíqú Jīchǎng

Anyang Hongqiqu Airport (IATA: HQQ, ICAO: ZHQQ) is an airport located in Tangyin country of Anyang city in Henan province of Central China. The airport opened on November 29, 2023.

== Airlines and destinations ==
Airlines	Destinations
Beijing Capital Airlines	Harbin, Sanya
China Southern Airlines	Guangzhou, Shenzhen
Ruili Airlines	Chengdu–Tianfu, Shenyang

== See also ==
- List of airports in China
- List of the busiest airports in China
