= VariFlight =

Chinese information technology company

- Available in: English, Chinese, Russian
- Founded: 2005
- Headquarters: Hefei, Anhui, China
- Key people: Hongfeng Zheng (CEO)
- Industry: Civil Aviation Data, Aircraft Tracking
- Website: www.variflight.com
- Current status: Active

Feeyo Technology Co., Ltd, (Chinese: 飞友科技有限公司), abbreviated as VariFlight, is a civil aviation digital technology enterprise established in 2005. Operating under the international brand VariFlight and the Mainland China brand Feichangzhun (Pinyin: Fēichángzhǔn), the company maintains its China headquarters in Hefei, Anhui Province, and its international headquarters in Singapore. It also operates branch offices in major hubs including Beijing, Shanghai, Nanjing, Chengdu, and Hong Kong. The company primarily provides flight status data services, airport operation management systems, passenger travel applications, and industry data analysis products and services.

== History ==
Formerly known as Hefei VariFlight Technology Co.,Ltd, the company was founded in Hefei in 2005 by CEO Zheng Hongfeng. During its early stages, the firm primarily provided flight information services for Chinese enterprises and initiated research into flight status and delay-related data.

2009: Attained 100% coverage of Chinese domestic flights and released the inaugural version of the VariFlight mobile application.From 2010: Expanded into the international flight data sector, eventually covering over 94% of global commercial flights.2011: Officially launched the passenger-facing flight management app "Feichangzhun" (VariFlight’s Chinese brand), providing flight tracking services for individual users. VariFlight started to cooperate with China's domestic airports on hubs' operation efficiency and punctuality improvement in 2014.

In 2017, VariFlight launched strategic cooperation with ICAO. Both parties collaborated on organizing the First Asia Pacific Ministerial Conference on Civil Aviation, 2018.

On 23 August 2019, VariFlight launched Airsavvi, a new brand dedicated to its travel data business for corporate clients.

2022: Provided technical support for the formulation and formal implementation of China's first industry standard for Airport Collaborative Decision Making (A-CDM). 2023–2025: Participated in the development of civil aviation data assetization and trusted data spaces, exploring the circulation and sharing of industry data elements.

== Data sources ==
The company uses the following sources to obtain flight status data and related information:

- Air Traffic Control
- Airlines
- Airports
- ADS-B.

== Aviation Data Services ==
Data coverage encompasses flight schedules, takeoff/landing times, flight trajectories, operational status, and meteorological information. The company provides continuous monitoring for the vast majority of Chinese domestic flights and major global commercial flights, offering robust data support for aviation operational analysis, forecasting, and management.

=== Airport Operation Management Systems ===
VariFlight Technology provides digital solutions for airports, airlines, and Air Traffic Control (ATC) units, centered on Airport Collaborative Decision Making (A-CDM) and Total Airport Management (TAM). These solutions support resource coordination, information sharing, and operational monitoring under complex conditions, enhancing operational transparency and collaborative efficiency.

=== Passenger Travel Services ===
Feichangzhun / VariFlight: Launched in 2011, this application provides passengers with flight status inquiries, itinerary management, and delay warnings, covering all stages of travel (pre-flight, in-flight, and post-flight).

VariFlight Pro: A professional edition integrated within the application for advanced user requirements.

=== A-CDM ===
VariFlight A-CDM (Airport Collaborative Decision Making) is an information system dedicated to the improvement of airport ground operations, safety and the growth of a hub's overall punctuality. Data sources: ADS-B, electronic blocks, apron vehicle positioning and video analysis. In the end of 2017, 81 airports located in Mainland China and outside have installed VariFlight's A-CDM. Among those airports are: Kunming Changshui International Airport, Guiyang Longdongbao International Airport, Shanghai Pudong International Airport, etc.

Shanghai Pudong International Airport has been using A-CDM developed by VariFlight since January 2017. The system is aimed to improve on-time performance and safety of the airport's operations. By June 2017, Shanghai Pudong airport recorded 62.7% punctuality rate, which was a 15% increase compared to the same period the previous year.

== Technical R&D and Industry Cooperation ==
Feeyo Technologyhas established the Joint Laboratory for Airport Internet of Things (IoT) with Hohai University, the Joint Research Center for Transportation Big Data with Nanjing University of Aeronautics and Astronautics (NUAA), and conducts collaborative research with the Civil Aviation Flight University of China (CAFUC). The company also participates in the development of post-doctoral research workstations.
