= Sanya Phoenix International Airport =

Airport serving Sanya, Hainan, China

Sanya Phoenix International Airport 三亚凤凰国际机场
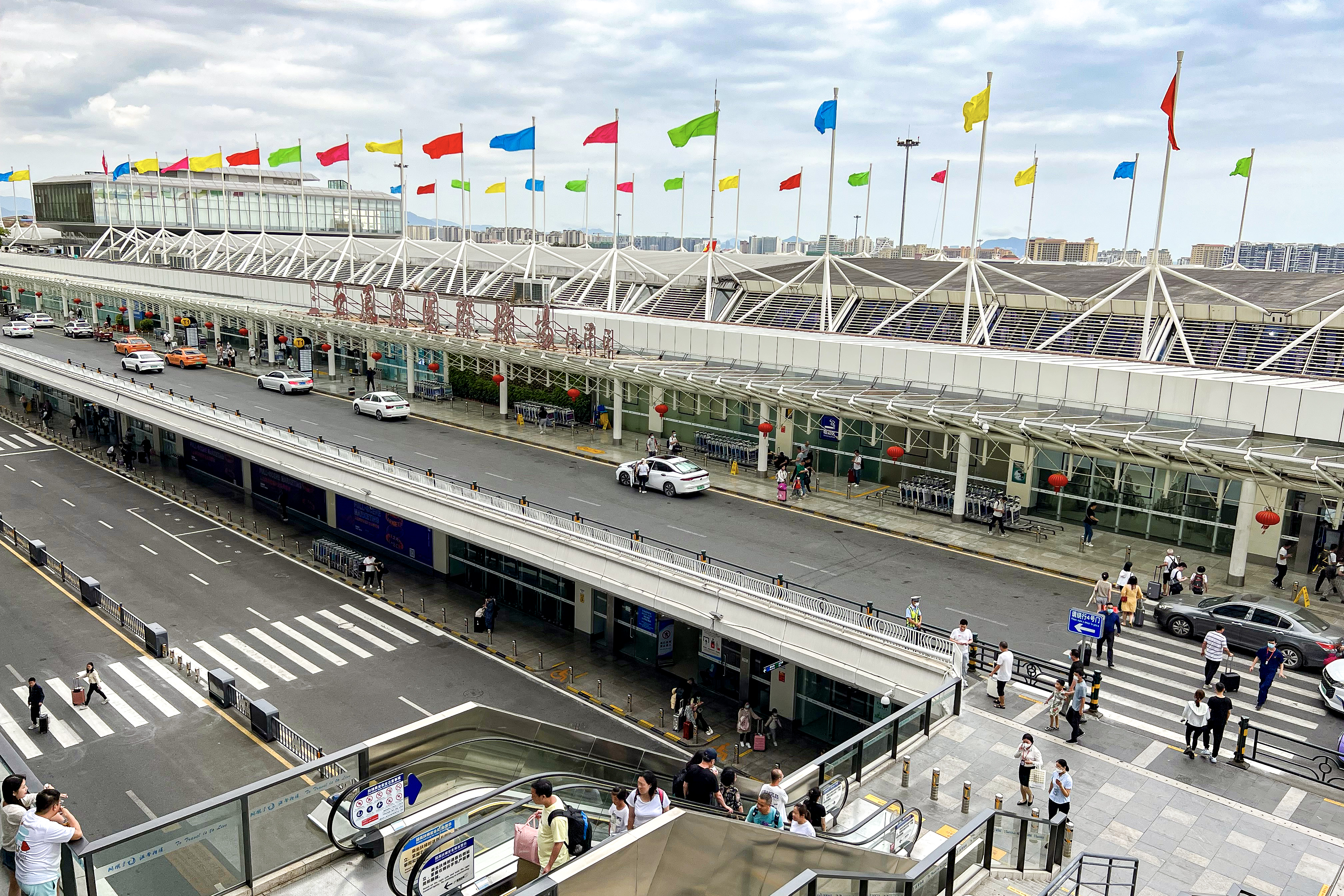
- Terminal 1 in March 2023
- IATA: SYX; ICAO: ZJSY

Summary
- Airport type: Public
- Operator: HNA Infrastructure Investment Group
- Serves: Sanya
- Location: Tianya, Sanya, Hainan, China
- Opened: 1 July 1994; 32 years ago
- Hub for: China Southern Airlines
- Elevation AMSL: 27 m (89 ft)
- Coordinates: 18°18′10.43″N 109°24′44.18″E
- Website: www.sanyaairport.com

Maps
- CAAC airport chart
- Location in Hainan SYX/ZJSY (China)

Runways
Direction	Length		Surface
Direction	m	ft	Surface
08/26	3,400	11,155	Concrete

Statistics (2025)
- Total passengers: 22,685,734
- Cargo (in tons): 117,135.6
- Aircraft movements: 139,873
- Source: List of the busiest airports in the People's Republic of China

Sanya Phoenix International Airport
- Simplified Chinese: 三亚凤凰国际机场
- Traditional Chinese: 三亞鳳凰國際機場
Transcriptions
Standard Mandarin
- Hanyu Pinyin: Sānyà Fènghuáng Guójì Jīcháng

Sanya Phoenix International Airport (IATA: SYX, ICAO: ZJSY) is an international airport serving the city of Sanya in South Central China's Hainan province. It is located about 15 km (9 mi) northwest of the city center.

Sanya Phoenix International Airport is a main airport hub and comprises close to ten thousand acres. The runway is about 3,400 metres (11,200 feet) long and 60 metres (200 feet) wide, which satisfies the take off and landing requirements of a fully weighted Boeing 747, Airbus A340 or other large aircraft.

It is the second busiest airport in Hainan, the busiest being Haikou Meilan International Airport. However, it was the first airport in Hainan to launch transcontinental air service, when Transaero Airlines started operating non-stop to Sanya from Moscow as early as 2007. The service was discontinued after Transaero ceased operations in 2015. Since 2017, several Russian airlines including IrAero, Alrosa and Azur Air have begun operating from various Russian cities, fueling the growth of tourism from Russia in Hainan.

In 2025, it was the 24th busiest airport in China.

== Airlines and destinations ==
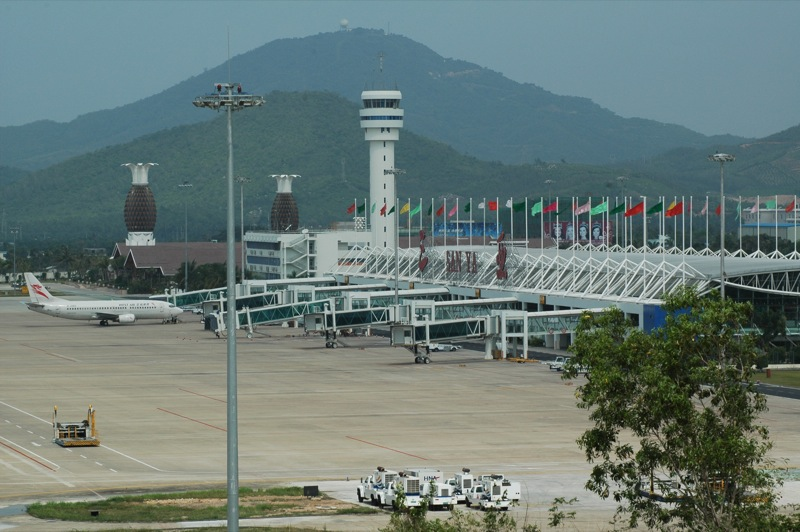
Terminal building

=== Passenger ===
Airlines	Destinations
9 Air	Guangzhou
Aeroflot	Irkutsk, Kazan, Khabarovsk, Krasnoyarsk-International, Moscow–Sheremetyevo, Novosibirsk, Saint Petersburg, Ufa, Vladivostok, Yekaterinburg
Air Chang'an	Huaihua, Nanyang, Xi'an
Air China	Beijing–Capital, Chengdu–Shuangliu, Chengdu–Tianfu, Chongqing
Air Guilin	Guilin
Batik Air Malaysia	Kuala Lumpur
Beijing Capital Airlines	Anshun, Anyang, Beijing–Daxing, Changchun, Changsha, Chengdu–Tianfu, Fuzhou, Guiyang, Hangzhou, Harbin, Hefei, Hohhot, Lanzhou, Linyi, Nanjing, Quanzhou, Shenyang, Shijiazhuang, Taiyuan, Tianjin, Wuhan, Xi'an, Yancheng, Yichun (Jiangxi), Zhengzhou
Belavia	Minsk
Cambodia Airways	Phnom Penh, Singapore
Chengdu Airlines	Changsha, Chengdu–Shuangliu, Hangzhou, Hefei, Shenyang
China Eastern Airlines	Beijing–Daxing, Kunming, Nanjing, Shanghai–Hongqiao, Shanghai–Pudong, Taiyuan, Wuhan, Wuxi, Xi'an
China Express Airlines	Xi'an, Yan'an
China Southern Airlines	Beijing–Daxing, Changchun, Changsha, Chengdu–Tianfu, Dalian, Daqing, Guangzhou, Guiyang, Hangzhou, Harbin, Hohhot, Kunming, Nanjing, Ordos, Shanghai–Pudong, Shenyang, Shenzhen, Ürümqi, Wuhan, Xi'an, Yiwu, Zhanjiang, Zhengzhou, Zhuhai
China United Airlines	Beijing–Daxing, Shijiazhuang, Wenzhou
Chongqing Airlines	Chongqing
Colorful Guizhou Airlines	Guiyang
Condor	Bangkok–Suvarnabhumi, Frankfurt
Donghai Airlines	Changsha, Nantong
Firefly	Kuala Lumpur
Fuzhou Airlines	Harbin, Huangshan, Taizhou
GX Airlines	Handan, Jining, Luoyang
Hainan Airlines	Beijing–Capital, Changchun, Changsha, Chengdu–Tianfu, Chongqing, Guangzhou, Guiyang, Hangzhou, Harbin, Hefei, Hohhot, Jinan, Jingzhou, Lanzhou, Nanchang, Nanjing, Nanning, Qingdao, Shanghai–Pudong, Shenyang, Shenzhen, Taiyuan, Ürümqi, Wuhan, Xi'an, Zhengzhou
Hebei Airlines	Shijiazhuang
HK Express	Hong Kong
Hong Kong Airlines	Hong Kong
Hunnu Air	Ulaanbaatar
IrAero	Blagoveshchensk (begins 11 December 2026), Chita (begins 10 December 2026)
Juneyao Air	Harbin, Nanjing, Shanghai–Hongqiao, Shanghai–Pudong, Ulaanbaatar (resumes 3 November 2026), Wuxi
Lao Airlines	Vientiane
LJ Air	Changchun, Ordos
Loong Air	Hangzhou, Harbin
Lucky Air	Chengdu–Tianfu, Kunming
MIAT Mongolian Airlines	Ulaanbaatar
Okay Airways	Changchun, Lanzhou, Nanning, Tianjin, Yinchuan
Qanot Sharq	Tashkent
Qingdao Airlines	Changchun, Nanjing
S7 Airlines	Irkutsk (begins 30 December 2026)
SCAT Airlines	Almaty, Astana, Singapore, Şymkent
Shandong Airlines	Jinan, Qingdao, Zhengzhou
Shanghai Airlines	Shanghai–Hongqiao, Shanghai–Pudong
Shenzhen Airlines	Harbin, Nantong, Shenyang, Shenzhen, Wenzhou, Yuncheng
Sichuan Airlines	Beijing–Capital, Changchun, Changsha, Chengdu–Shuangliu, Chengdu–Tianfu, Chongqing, Guilin, Guiyang, Harbin, Jinan, Lanzhou, Luzhou, Mianyang, Shenyang, Taiyuan, Ürümqi, Xi'an, Xining, Yibin, Yinchuan
Spring Airlines	Ningbo, Shanghai–Hongqiao, Shanghai–Pudong, Shenyang, Shijiazhuang, Tianjin
Suparna Airlines	Hangzhou, Shanghai–Pudong
Tianjin Airlines	Hengyang, Shangrao, Shiyan, Tianjin, Ürümqi, Xi'an, Xiangyang, Yichang, Yulin (Shaanxi), Zunyi–Xinzhou
Tibet Airlines	Chengdu–Shuangliu
Uzbekistan Airways	Tashkent
West Air	Chongqing, Ganzhou, Harbin, Jinan, Nanchang, Xuzhou, Zhengzhou
XiamenAir	Beijing–Daxing, Fuzhou, Hangzhou, Shenyang, Xiamen

=== Cargo ===
Airlines	Destinations
Tianjin Air Cargo	Singapore

== Ground transportation ==
Sanya Phoenix Airport Railway Station of the Hainan Western Ring High-Speed Railway, opened on 30 December 2015, is located just north of the airport. Initially, it connects on the Sanya Railway Station on the Hainan Eastern Ring High-Speed Railway (10 km to the east), and provides frequent high-speed rail service to a number of points along Hainan's eastern coast.

With the construction of the rest of the Hainan Western Ring High-Speed Railway, from Sanya Phoenix Airport to Haikou, rail service from Sanya Station become available to stations on the island's west coast as well.

== See also ==
- List of airports in China
- China's busiest airports by passenger traffic
