= Bijie Feixiong Airport =

Airport serving Bijie, Guizhou, China

Bijie Feixiong Airport 毕节飞雄机场
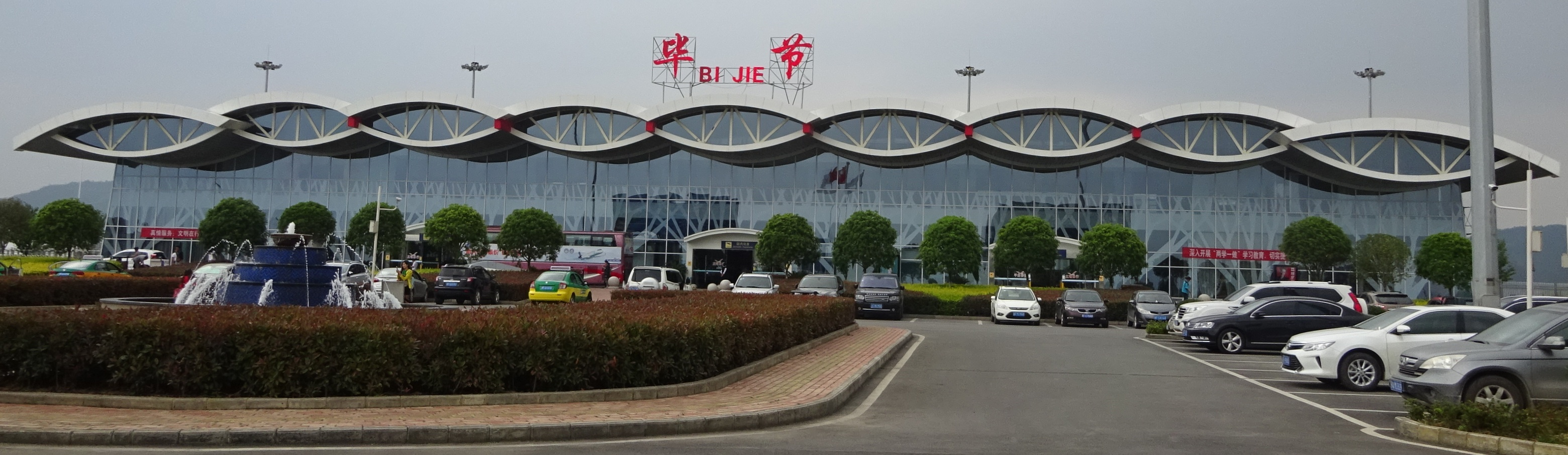
- IATA: BFJ; ICAO: ZUBJ

Summary
- Airport type: Public
- Serves: Bijie, Guizhou, China
- Location: Dafang County
- Opened: 16 June 2013; 13 years ago 9 July 2026; 4 months ago (resume operation)
- Time zone: CST (UTC+08:00)
- Elevation AMSL: 1,448 m (4,751 ft)
- Coordinates: 27°16′00″N 105°28′45″E

Map
- Location of airport in Guizhou

Runways
Direction	Length		Surface
Direction	m	ft	Surface
08/26	3,000	9,843	Concrete

Statistics (2021)
- Passengers: 552,352
- Aircraft movements: 7,490
- Cargo (metric tons): 250.9
- Source: CAAC Gov, GCM, STV

Bijie Feixiong Airport
- Simplified Chinese: 毕节飞雄机场
- Traditional Chinese: 畢節飛雄機場
Transcriptions
Standard Mandarin
- Hanyu Pinyin: Bìjié Fēixióng Jīchǎng

Bijie Feixiong Airport (IATA: BFJ, ICAO: ZUBJ) is an airport serving the city of Bijie in Guizhou Province, China. It is located in Dafang County, 18 kilometres (11 mi) from the city center. Construction began in May 2011 with a total investment of 1.05 billion CNY, and the airport was opened on 16 June 2013..

The airport was resumed operation from 9 July 2026.

== Facilities ==
The airport has a runway that is 2,600 meters long and 45 meters wide (class 4C), and a 7,100-square-meter terminal building. It is projected to handle 200,000 passengers annually by 2020.

== Airlines and destinations ==
Airlines	Destinations
China Southern Airlines	Guangzhou
China United Airlines	Beijing–Daxing, Wenzhou
Colorful Guizhou Airlines	Fuzhou, Ningbo, Tongren, Xingyi
GX Airlines	Haikou, Xi'an
Juneyao Air	Shanghai–Pudong
Loong Air	Hangzhou

== See also ==
- List of airports in China
- List of the busiest airports in China
