= Wenzhou Longwan International Airport =

Airport serving Wenzhou, Zhejiang, China

Wenzhou Longwan International Airport 温州龙湾国际机场
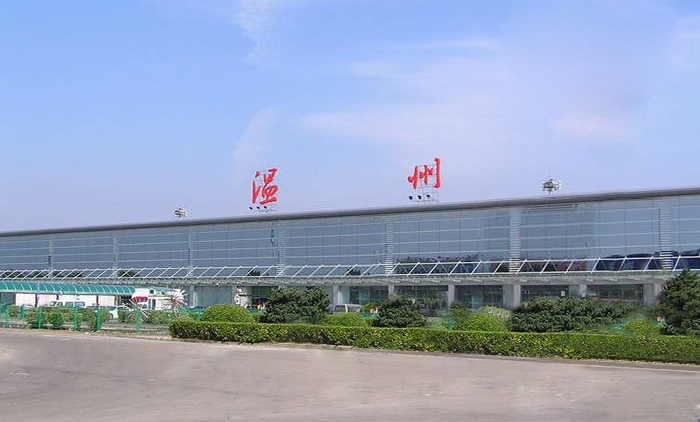
- Wenzhou Airport
- IATA: WNZ; ICAO: ZSWZ

Summary
- Airport type: Public
- Operator: Wenzhou Airport Group Co. Ltd.
- Serves: Wenzhou
- Location: Longwan, Wenzhou, Zhejiang, China
- Opened: 12 July 1990; 36 years ago
- Coordinates: 27°54′43″N 120°51′07″E
- Website: www.wzair.cn

Map
- Location in Zhejiang Location in China

Runways
Direction	Length		Surface
Direction	m	ft	Surface
03/21	3,200	10,499	Concrete
(planned)	3,600	11,811	-

Statistics (2025)
- Passengers: 13,058,523
- Cargo (metric tons): 128,653.5
- Aircraft movements: 93,735
- Source: China's busiest airports by passenger traffic

Wenzhou Longwan International Airport
- Simplified Chinese: 温州龙湾国际机场
- Traditional Chinese: 溫州龍灣國際機場
Transcriptions
Standard Mandarin
- Hanyu Pinyin: Wēnzhōu Lóngwān Guójì Jīchǎng

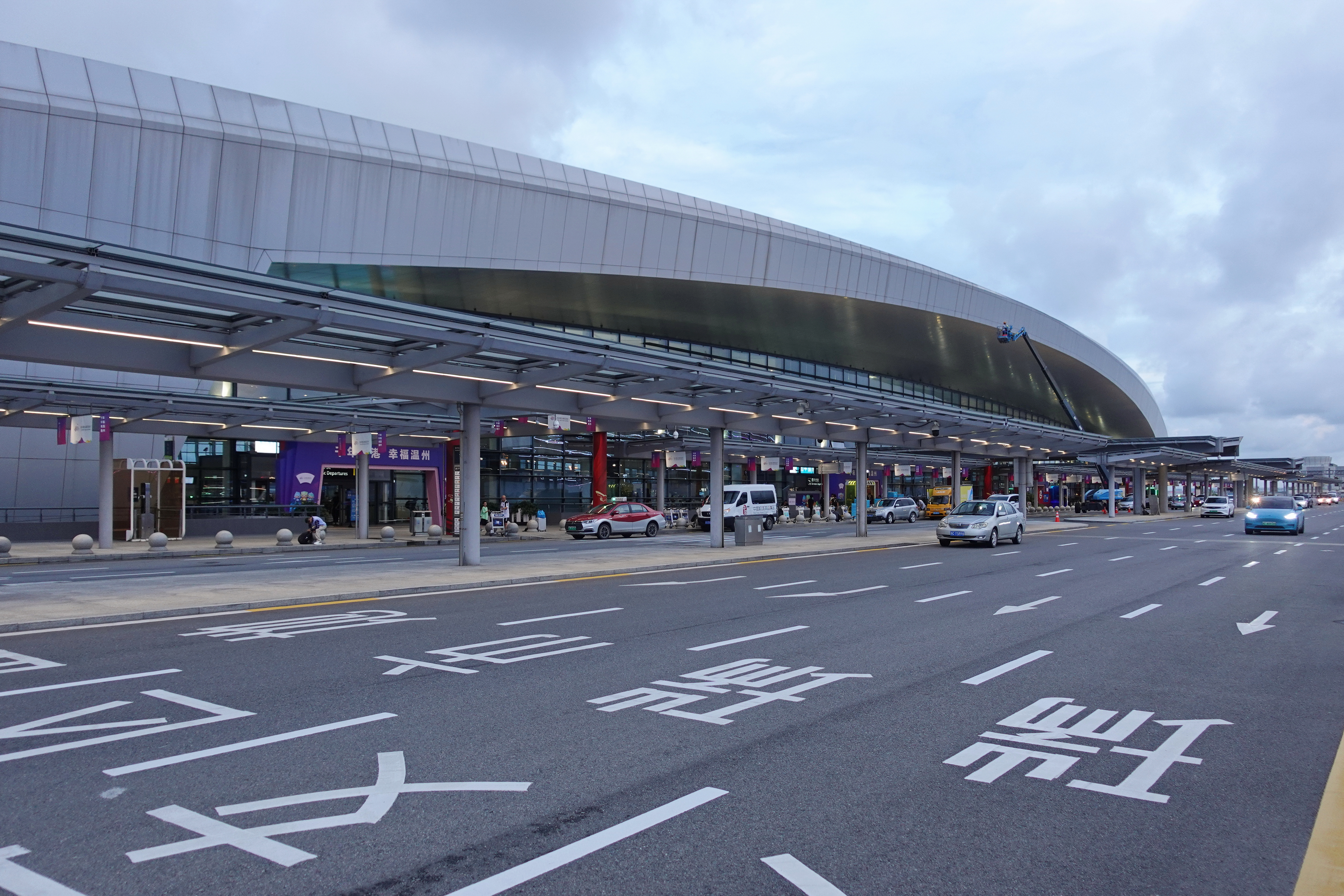
Wenzhou Longwan Airport T2

Wenzhou Longwan International Airport (IATA: WNZ, ICAO: ZSWZ) is an airport serving the city of Wenzhou in East China's Zhejiang province. Formerly called Wenzhou Yongqiang Airport, it adopted its current name on 25 April 2013.

The airport is located 24 km (15 mi) southeast of the city. In 2025, Wenzhou Airport was the 35th-busiest airport in mainland China with 13,058,523 passengers.

== History ==
Wenzhou Longwan International Airport began construction in 1987, originally following the standards of a domestic Class‑II civil airport. The construction cost was RMB132.5 million dollars and was funded by Wenzhou's municipal government. On July 12, 1990, Wenzhou Airport officially opened to traffic, launching four routes to Shanghai, Wuhan, Chengdu, and Ningbo on the same day. In May 1994, the terminal renovation and expansion project was completed and put into use. After the renovation and expansion, the total building area of the terminal increased from the original 4,697.7 square meters to 11,200 square meters. In 1995, it passed port‑of‑entry inspection, enabling direct flights to Hong Kong and Macau.

In 2002, it was renamed 'Civil Aviation Wenzhou Yongqiang Airport' (民航溫州永強機場). In October 2003, the expanded VIP waiting lounge and first-class waiting lounge were put into use, with an area of 1,700 square meters. In June 2006, Wenzhou Airport launched its terminal area expansion project, acquiring 2,100 mu (畝) of new land and constructing a new runway 3,200 meters long and 45 meters wide. In November 2008, a newly built terminal with a total floor area of 36,500 square meters entered service.

In June 2011, a new international terminal with a floor area of 10,500 square meters—designed to handle 300,000 passengers annually—was put into operation. On April 25, 2013, the airport was officially renamed 'Wenzhou Longwan International Airport.' In 2013, it launched its first scheduled international route, to Bangkok. Terminal 2 entered service in 2018, raising total annual passenger capacity to 15 million. After multiple rounds of expansion, it was renamed and upgraded to an international airport in 2013. It is a 4D‑class civil airport and serves as Wenzhou's primary air gateway. In October 2013, a new runway measuring 3,200 meters in length and 60 meters in width officially opened, enabling operations for large aircraft such as the Boeing 747 and Airbus A330.

In June 2018, Wenzhou Airport successfully completed the transition to Terminal 2, marking the beginning of dual‑terminal operations. That November, annual passenger throughput surpassed 10 million, making it the 36th airport in China to reach the "10‑million‑passenger" tier. In September 2019, the airport section of the S1 metropolitan railway line opened, making Wenzhou the first city in Zhejiang Province to achieve seamless 'air‑to‑rail zero‑transfer' connectivity. In September 2023, the airport's Phase III expansion project received approval from the National Development and Reform Commission. The Phase III plan includes construction of a second runway 3,600 meters long and a new Terminal 3, designed to support an annual passenger throughput of 30 million.

In 2025, the airport recorded 93,700 aircraft movements, 13.0585 million passengers, and 128,700 tons of cargo and mail—each reaching a historic high. Its annual passenger‑traffic ranking rose by one place to 35th among airports nationwide. Over the year, it operated 102 destinations and had cumulatively served 186 cities. The airport also maintained stable operations on its three intercontinental passenger routes to Rome, Milan, and Madrid.

== Facilities ==
The airport can handle aircraft as large as the Boeing 767 and Airbus A330. The departure lounge occupies 12,000 m^{2} (129,167 sq ft) in area. The apron occupies an area of 73,000 m^{2} (785,765 sq ft).

== New terminal ==
Construction of the new Terminal 2 officially began on 11 November 2011. It will have an area of 100,000 square metres (1,076,391 sq ft), four times larger than the existing Terminal 1, and will be able to handle 13 million passengers per year. When completed, it will be used exclusively for domestic flights, while Terminal 1 will be converted to a dedicated international terminal. Terminal 2 is the centrepiece of the new Wenzhou Comprehensive Transportation Hub development, which also includes a long-distance bus terminal, subway station, as well as commercial real estate.

== Future expansions ==
The third phase expansion of Wenzhou Airport not only aims to improve the annual passenger capacity from the existing about 13 million passengers to meet the needs of 30 million passengers in 2030, but also aims to seamlessly integrated with the Wenzhou East Railway station in the future. The total investment for this project is approximately 10.97 billion RMB, with 1.1 billion RMB planned for investment in 2026.

The existing terminal 2 will be expanded, while terminal 1 will also be upgraded facilities. Once completed, the total area of all terminal will reach 330,000 square meters. The freight capacity will also be increased, with a planned new cargo facility of about 67,000 square meters, with an annual processing capacity of 320,000 tons, which is almost twice the existing freight support capacity. The comprehensive upgrade of these hardware facilities is to match the design goals of 30 million passengers and 285,000 tons of cargo and mail throughput in 2030.

A planned new second runway spanning 3,600 meters long will be built on the east side of the existing 3,200 meters runway. Furthermore, 50 new aircraft stands will be added and new 132,000 square meters terminal 3 will also built.

== Airlines and destinations ==
=== Passenger ===
Airlines	Destinations
9 Air	Guiyang, Xingyi, Vientiane
Air Chang'an	Guiyang, Xi'an, Yichang
Air China	Beijing–Capital, Beijing–Daxing, Chengdu–Shuangliu, Chengdu–Tianfu, Chongqing, Guangzhou, Guiyang, Jeju, Nanchong, Seoul–Incheon, Shanghai–Pudong, Taiyuan, Tianjin, Xi'an, Zhanjiang
Air Macau	Macau
Air Travel	Kunming, Tongren
Beijing Capital Airlines	Guiyang
Cathay Pacific	Hong Kong
Chengdu Airlines	Chengdu–Shuangliu, Guiyang, Hohhot, Lijiang, Shijiazhuang
China Eastern Airlines	Enshi, Guilin, Huai'an, Jieyang, Kunming, Madrid, Nanchang, Qingdao, Rome–Fiumicino, Shanghai–Pudong, Taiyuan, Wuhan, Xi'an
China Express Airlines	Chongqing, Ganzhou, Shiyan, Zhoushan
China Southern Airlines	Beijing–Daxing, Changsha, Guangzhou, Guiyang, Shenzhen, Ürümqi, Wuhan, Zhengzhou
China United Airlines	Beijing–Daxing, Bijie, Changchun, Changsha, Chengdu–Tianfu, Chongqing, Dongying, Foshan, Guangzhou, Haikou, Harbin, Jeju, Kunming, Qionghai, Sanya, Shenyang, Shenzhen, Shijiazhuang, Taiyuan, Tianjin, Vientiane, Xi'an, Zhuhai, Zunyi–Xinzhou
Chongqing Airlines	Chongqing, Wanzhou
Hainan Airlines	Beijing–Capital, Chongqing, Guangzhou, Haikou, Shenzhen, Ürümqi, Wuhan, Zhengzhou
Juneyao Air	Chifeng, Nanning, Qingdao
Loong Air	Aksu, Bangkok-Suvarnabhumi, Chengdu–Tianfu, Guiyang, Ho Chi Minh City, Hengyang, Jingzhou, Lanzhou, Lijiang, Nanning, Singapore, Wuhan, Xi'an, Xiangyang, Xishuangbanna
Lucky Air	Kunming
Pacific Airlines	Seasonal charter: Phu Quoc
Qingdao Airlines	Guiyang, Qingdao
Ruili Airlines	Dalian, Kunming
Shandong Airlines	Jinan, Zhuhai
Shanghai Airlines	Changsha, Harbin, Nanning, Shanghai–Pudong, Tianjin, Xi'an, Yantai, Yinchuan, Zhengzhou
Shenzhen Airlines	Guangzhou, Harbin, Linyi, Sanya, Shenyang, Shenzhen, Xi'an, Yibin, Yuncheng, Zhengzhou
Sichuan Airlines	Chengdu–Tianfu, Chongqing, Guiyang, Harbin, Jinan
Tianjin Airlines	Haikou, Qingdao, Yangzhou, Yantai, Yulin (Shaanxi)
Tibet Airlines	Mianyang
Urumqi Air	Dazhou, Hanzhong, Ürümqi
West Air	Chongqing, Zhengzhou
XiamenAir	Shenyang, Xiamen

=== Cargo ===
Airlines	Destinations
Central Airlines	Manila, Seoul–Incheon, Shenzhen
My Freighter Airlines	Tashkent
YTO Cargo Airlines	Manila, Seoul–Incheon

== Accidents and incidents ==
- On 20 March 2011, China Eastern Airlines flight 5577, an Airbus A320-200 from Shanghai Hongqiao International Airport clipped trees on approach at Longwan Airport.

== See also ==
- List of airports in China
- List of the busiest airports in China
