= Shenyang Taoxian International Airport =

Airport serving Shenyang, Liaoning, China

Shenyang Taoxian International Airport 沈阳桃仙国际机场
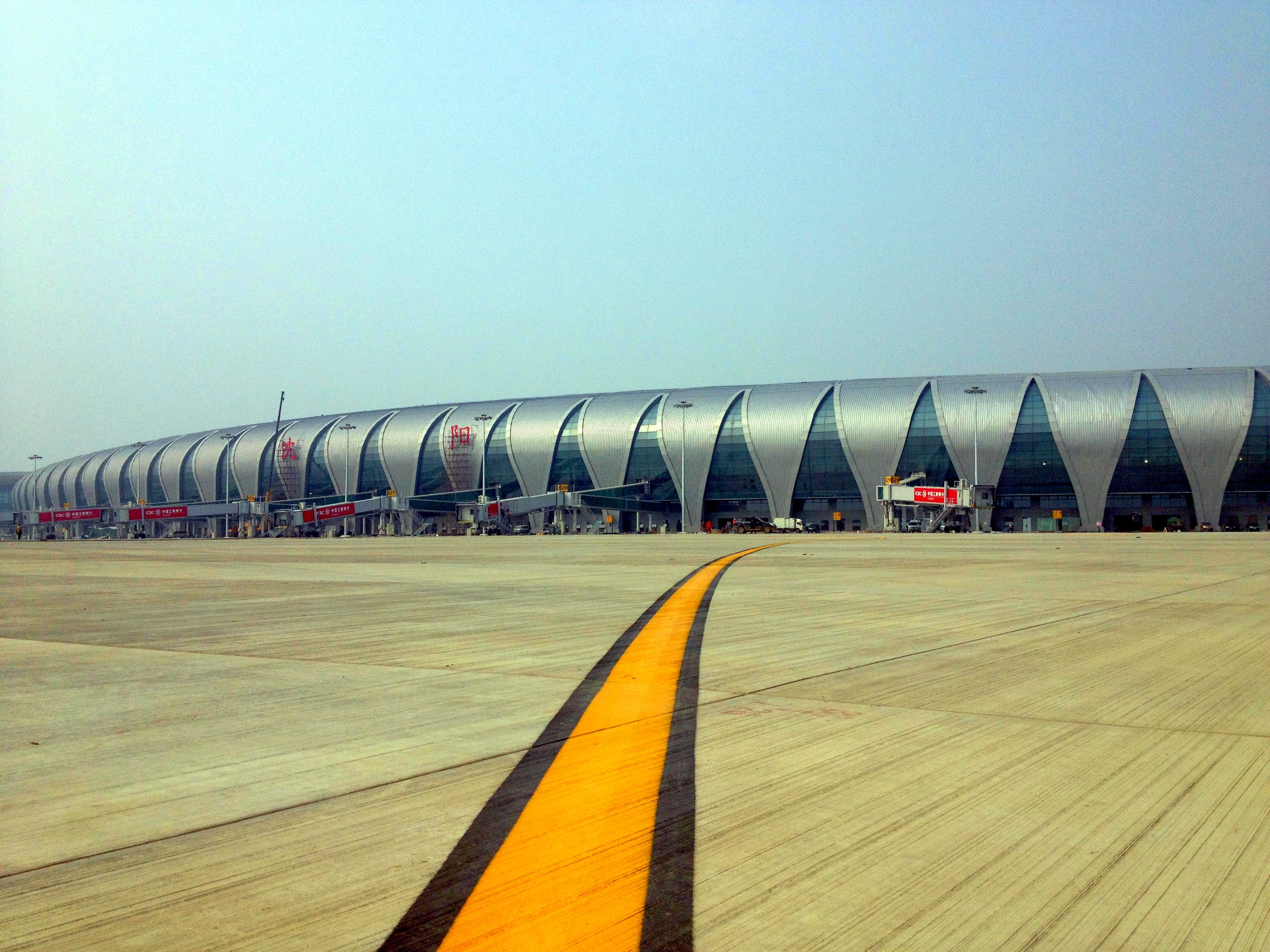
- IATA: SHE; ICAO: ZYTX

Summary
- Airport type: Public
- Owner/Operator: Shenyang Taoxian Airport Authority
- Serves: Shenyang
- Location: Taoxian Town, Hunnan, Shenyang, Liaoning, China
- Opened: 16 April 1989; 37 years ago
- Hub for: China Southern Airlines
- Elevation AMSL: 60 m (200 ft)
- Coordinates: 41°38′24″N 123°29′01″E

Maps
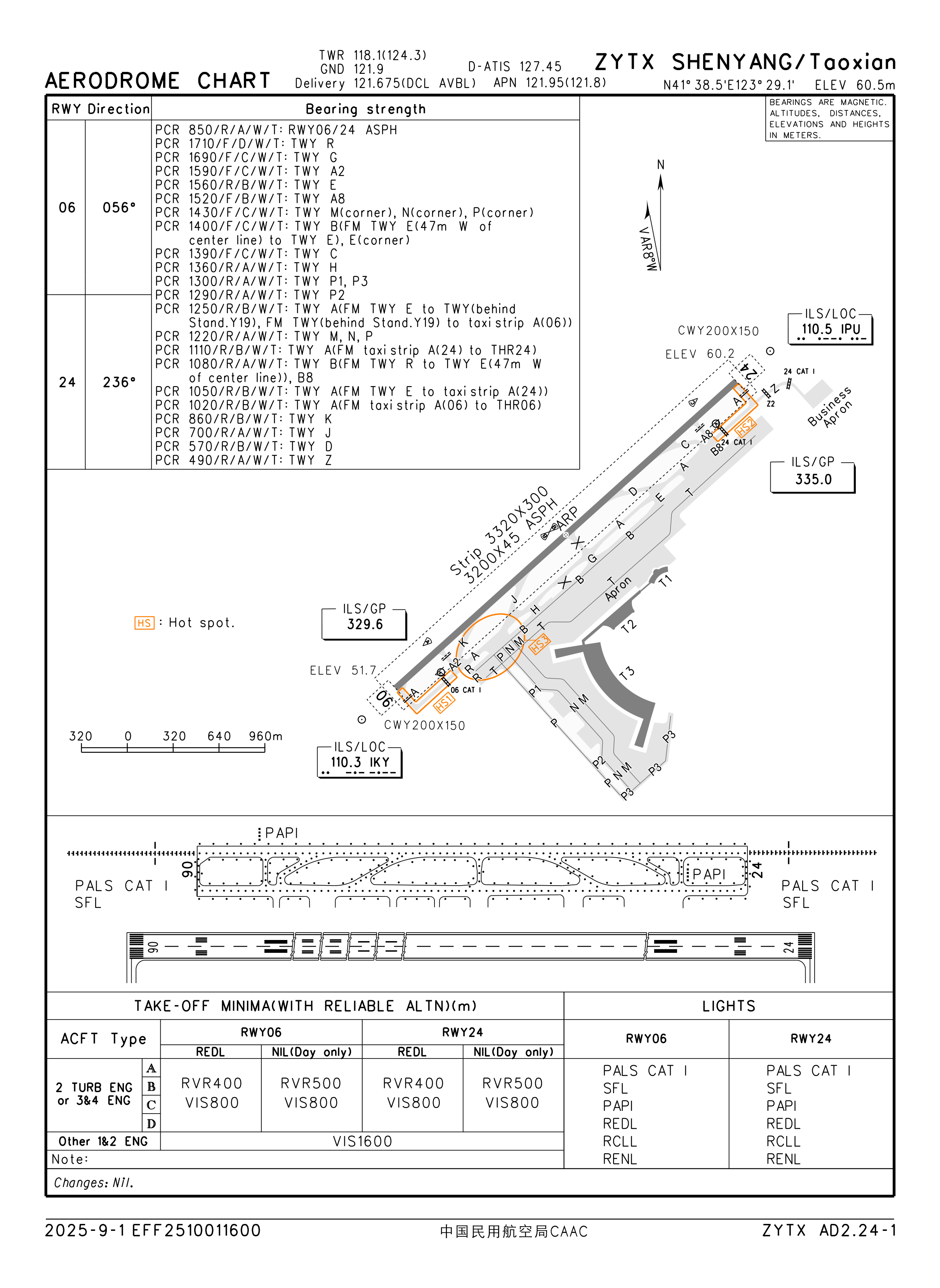
- CAAC airport chart

- Location in Liaoning Location in China

Runways
Direction	Length		Surface
Direction	m	ft	Surface
06/24	3,200	10,499	Concrete

Statistics (2025)
- Passengers: 24,938,062 ▲5.0%
- Cargo (in tons): 210,954.4 ▼7.5%
- Aircraft movements: 164,261 ▲1.9%
- Source: China's busiest airports by passenger traffic

Shenyang Taoxian International Airport
- Simplified Chinese: 沈阳桃仙国际机场
- Traditional Chinese: 瀋陽桃仙國際機場
Transcriptions
Standard Mandarin
- Hanyu Pinyin: Shěnyáng Táoxiān Guójì Jīchǎng

Shenyang Taoxian International Airport (IATA: SHE, ICAO: ZYTX) is an international airport serving Shenyang, the capital of Northeast China's Liaoning province. It is located about 20 km (12 mi) south of the city center in Hunnan District. It is a hub for China Southern Airlines and was the 21st busiest airport in China with 24,938,062 passengers in 2025.

== History ==
Construction started on 1 July 1985, and the airport opened on 16 April 1989, and was the main hub of China Northern Airlines, which started operating a year later. Shenyang's previous airport, Shenyang Dongta Airport, was the main airport of the city at that time, built in 1921, which served destinations to the USSR, Mongolia, Japan, South Korea, North Korea, and hence, domestically. However, although it was expanded several times and had a long enough runway to support narrow-body airliners, it was no longer able to accommodate more tourists and passengers. This was due to the reform and opening up, resulting in the steeply rising number of passenger tourists, whether local or foreign. As a result, Taoxian airport was built and opened on 1989 and Dongta Airport ceased civil operations, and reverted to military use (by the Imperial Japanese from 1936 to 1945 and PLAAF after 1950) until 2013.

Lufthansa offered the first intercontinental service out of Shenyang, to Frankfurt, Germany, in April 2012 but discontinued it on 28 October 2016, before relaunching it on 27 March 2018. Later in 2012, Sichuan Airlines launched a service to Vancouver.

== Airlines and destinations ==
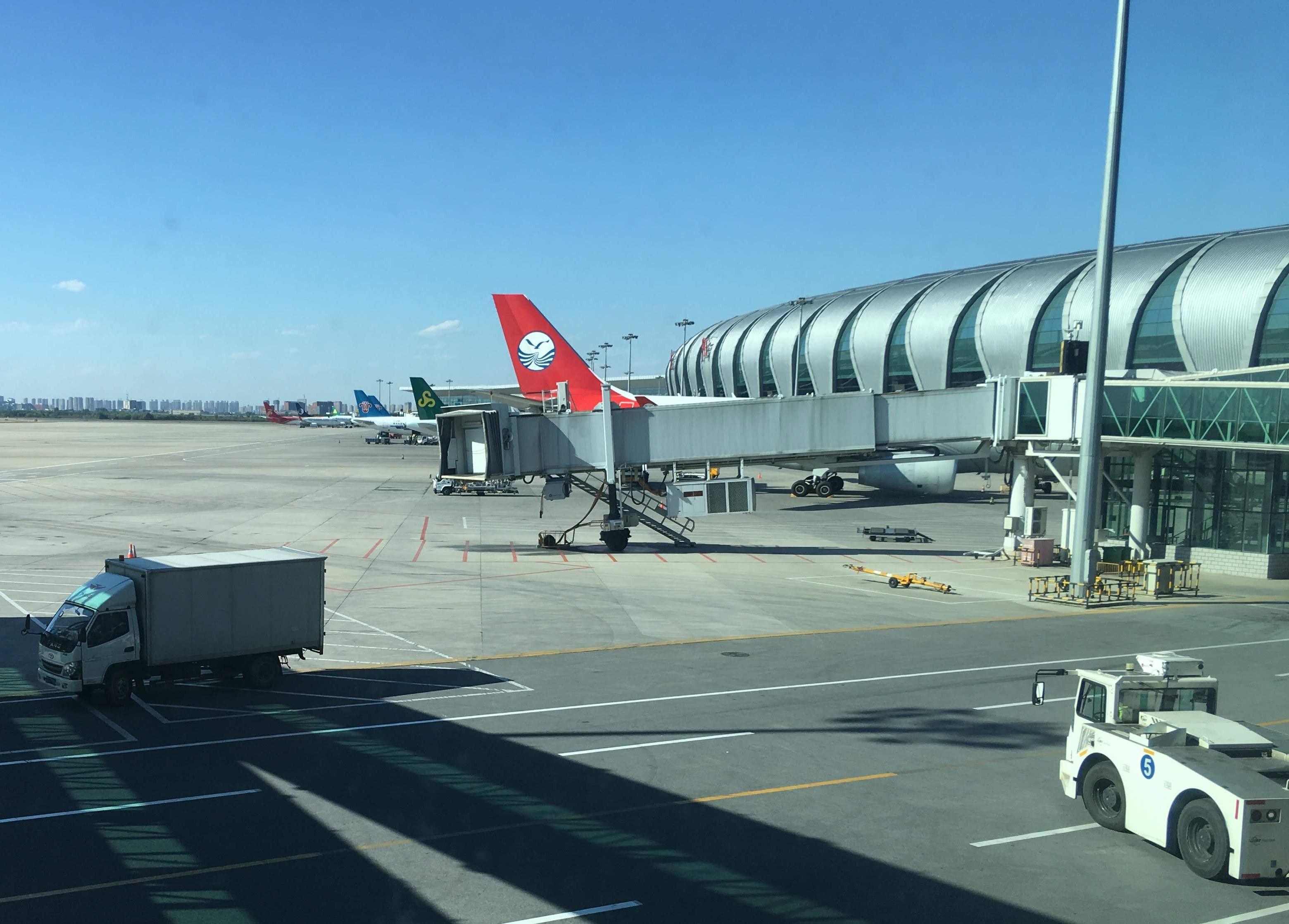
Apron view

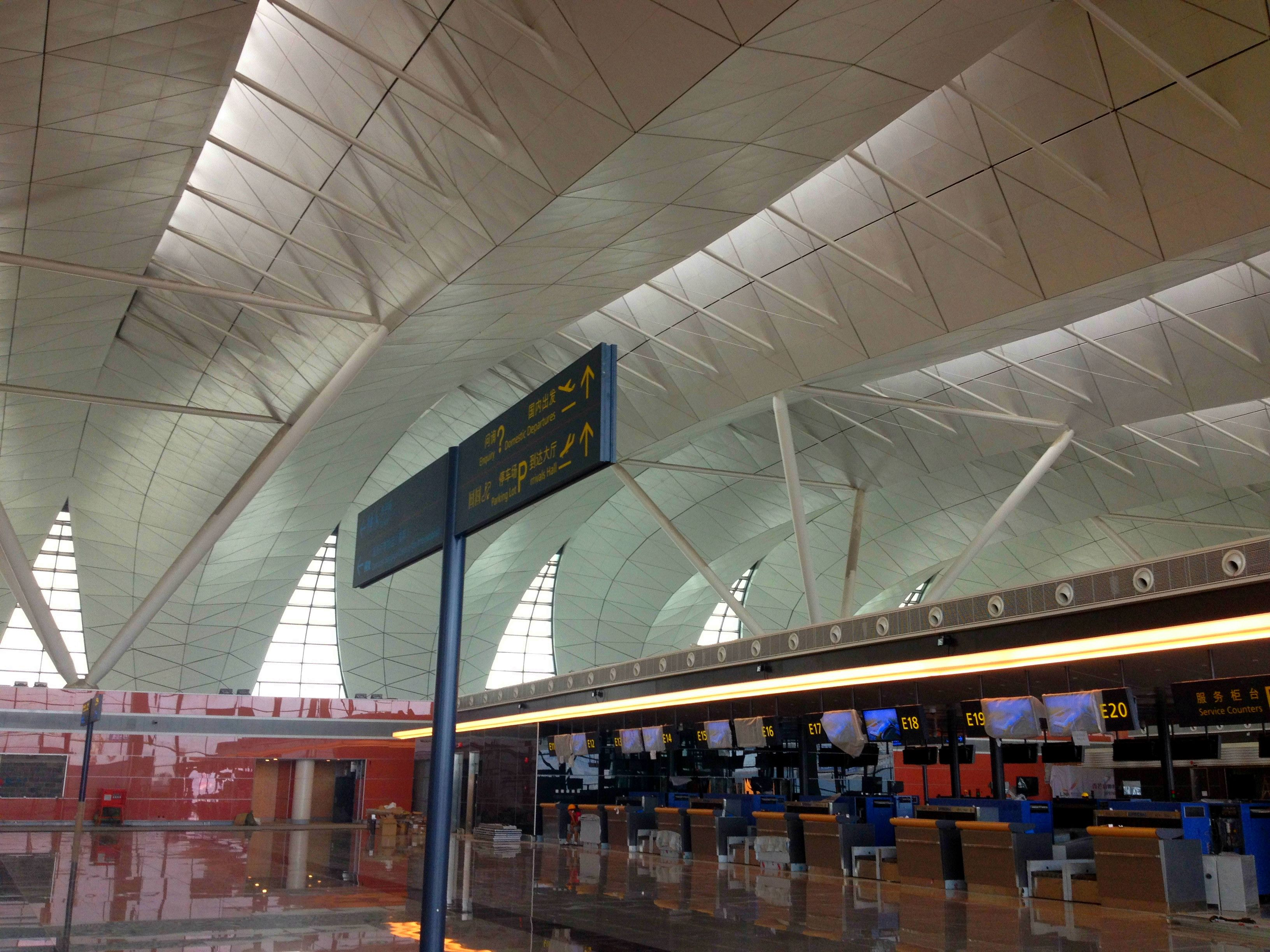
Main hall interior

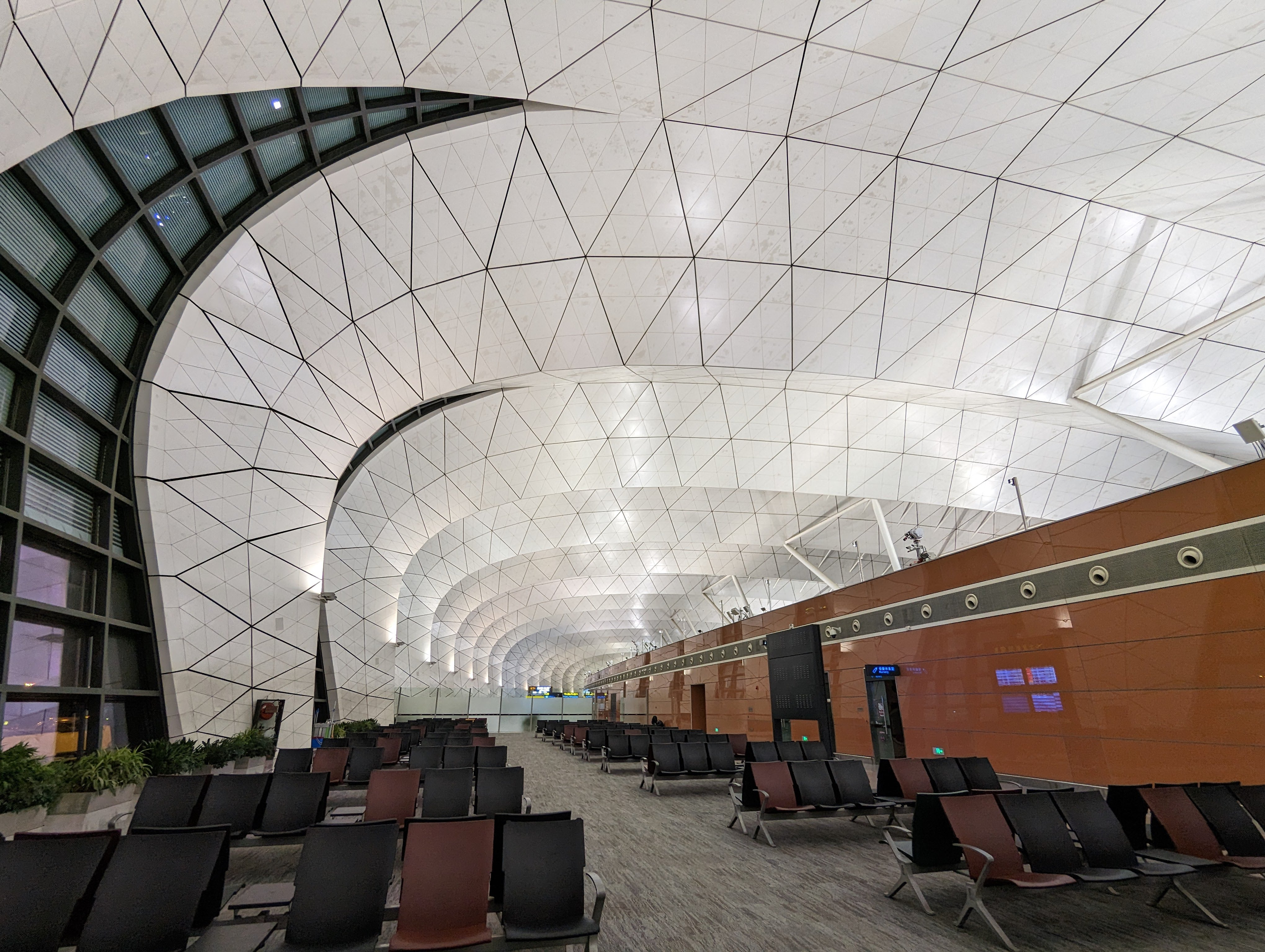
Terminal interior in 2023

=== Passenger ===
Airlines	Destinations
9 Air	Guangzhou, Guiyang, Huangshan, Wuxi, Zhangjiajie
Air Chang'an	Xi'an
Air China	Beijing–Capital, Beijing–Daxing, Chengdu–Tianfu, Chongqing, Hohhot, Kunming, Wuhan, Yuncheng
Air Guilin	Guilin, Haikou, Jingzhou, Kunming, Xinzhou
Air Koryo	Pyongyang
Air Travel	Changsha, Kunming, Wuxi
Beijing Capital Airlines	Fuzhou, Haikou, Kunming, Lanzhou, Lijiang, Qingdao, Sanya, Shijiazhuang, Shiyan, Wuhan, Xishuangbanna
Chengdu Airlines	Baotou, Beihai, Changsha, Changzhou, Chengdu–Shuangliu, Chengdu–Tianfu, Guiyang, Haikou, Hefei, Lijiang, Lüliang, Mianyang, Sanya, Wuhan, Yancheng
China Eastern Airlines	Changzhou, Chengdu–Tianfu, Huai'an, Kunming, Moscow–Sheremetyevo, Nanchang, Nanjing, Ningbo, Qingdao, Shanghai–Hongqiao, Shanghai–Pudong, Tengchong, Wuhan, Wuxi, Xi'an, Xining, Xinyang, Yancheng, Yinchuan, Zhanjiang, Zhuhai
China Express Airlines	Baotou, Changzhi, Chongqing, Ulanhot, Weifang, Yan'an
China Southern Airlines	Beijing–Daxing, Busan, Changsha, Chengdu–Tianfu, Chongqing, Dubai–International, Frankfurt, Guangzhou, Guiyang, Haikou, Hangzhou, Hong Kong, Jiamusi, Jixi, Kunming, Lanzhou, Nanjing, Nanning, Ningbo, Osaka–Kansai, Qingdao, Qiqihar, Sanya, Seoul–Incheon, Shanghai–Pudong, Shenzhen, Shihezi, Tacheng, Taipei–Taoyuan, Tokyo–Narita, Urumqi, Wuhan, Xiamen, Xi'an, Xishuangbanna, Yichun (Heilongjiang), Yiwu, Zhengzhou, Zhuhai; Seasonal: Vladivostok
China United Airlines	Wenzhou
Colorful Guizhou Airlines	Guiyang, Lianyungang
Eastar Jet	Cheongju
GX Airlines	Jinan, Jining, Nanning, Yichang, Zhangjiajie
Hainan Airlines	Guangzhou, Haikou, Hefei, Jinan, Sanya, Urumqi, Xiamen, Xi'an
Hebei Airlines	Changsha, Chongqing, Nanjing, Shijiazhuang
IrAero	Charter: Irkutsk
Jiangxi Air	Haikou, Jinan, Nanchang, Ordos
Juneyao Air	Hailar, Nanjing, Shanghai–Pudong
Korean Air	Seoul–Incheon
Kunming Airlines	Changsha
Loong Air	Chengdu–Tianfu, Hangzhou, Jiaxing, Kunming, Ningbo, Taiyuan, Weihai, Xuzhou, Zhuhai
Mandarin Airlines	Taipei–Taoyuan
Okay Airways	Changsha, Qingdao, Taiyuan
Qingdao Airlines	Chongqing, Luoyang, Qingdao, Shijiazhuang, Xishuangbanna
Ruili Airlines	Anyang, Changsha, Chengdu–Tianfu, Hohhot, Holingol, Kunming, Xi'an, Xiangxi, Xinzhou
Scoot	Singapore
Shandong Airlines	Chongqing, Dongying, Guiyang, Jinan, Kunming, Qingdao, Shenzhen, Taiyuan, Wuhan, Xiamen, Xuzhou, Yantai, Zhangjiajie, Zhengzhou, Zhuhai
Shanghai Airlines	Shanghai–Hongqiao, Shanghai–Pudong
Shenzhen Airlines	Changsha, Changzhou, Chengdu–Tianfu, Dazhou, Fuzhou, Guangzhou, Haikou, Hefei, Huizhou, Linyi, Nanchang, Nanjing, Nanning, Nantong, Quanzhou, Sanya, Shenzhen, Taiyuan, Wenzhou, Wuhan, Wuxi, Xiamen, Xi'an, Xiangyang, Xining, Yangzhou, Yantai, Yibin, Yichang, Zhengzhou, Zhuhai
Sichuan Airlines	Chengdu–Shuangliu, Chengdu–Tianfu, Chongqing, Kunming, Sanya, Taiyuan, Xi'an, Xuzhou
Sky Angkor Airlines	Charter: Siem Reap
Spring Airlines	Changzhou, Chongqing, Dongying, Fuzhou, Guilin, Handan, Hangzhou, Hefei, Hohhot, Jeju, Jieyang, Lanzhou, Nanjing, Ningbo, Osaka–Kansai, Qingdao, Sanya, Shanghai–Pudong, Taiyuan, Weihai, Xiamen, Xi'an, Yancheng, Yangzhou
Suparna Airlines	Shanghai–Pudong
Tianjin Airlines	Yulin (Shaanxi)
Trinity Airways	Seoul–Incheon
Uni Air	Taipei–Taoyuan
VietJet Air	Nha Trang
Vietnam Airlines	Charter: Hanoi, Nha Trang
West Air	Rizhao
XiamenAir	Changsha, Chongqing, Fuzhou, Hangzhou, Huai'an, Nanjing, Qingdao, Quanzhou, Sanya, Shenzhen, Wenzhou, Wuhan, Xiamen
Xizang Airlines	Chengdu–Shuangliu

=== Cargo ===
Airlines	Destinations
China Postal Airlines	Dalian, Dandong, Shanghai–Hongqiao, Weifang
Lufthansa Cargo	Frankfurt, Krasnoyarsk, Tokyo–Narita
Cargojet Airways	Tokyo–Narita, Vancouver

== Ground transportation ==
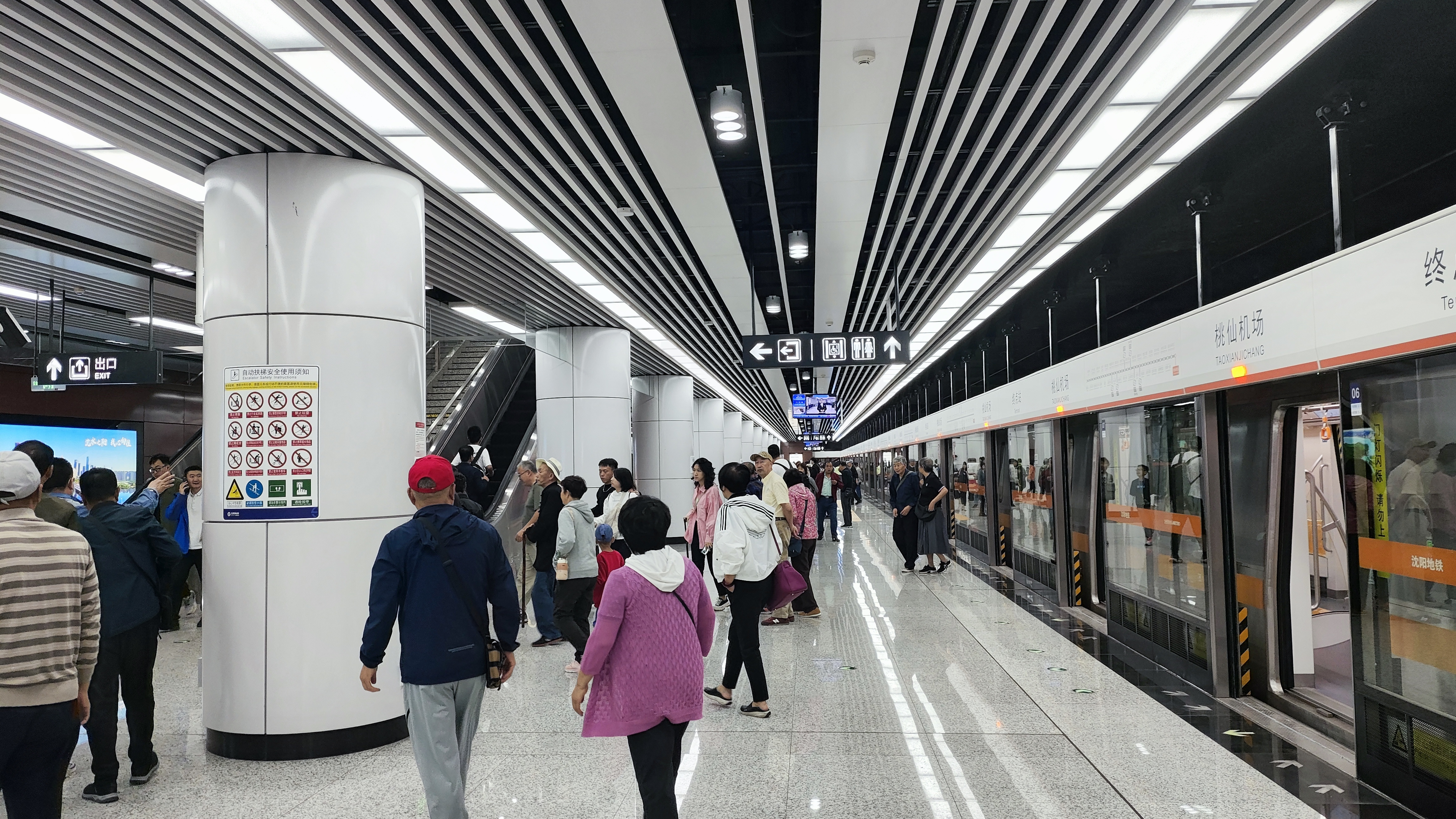
Taoxian Airport Station

The airport is served by the Shenyang Tram line 2 and line 6.

== See also ==
- List of airports in China
- China's busiest airports by passenger traffic
