= Guiyang Longdongbao International Airport =

Airport serving Guiyang, Guizhou, China

Guiyang Longdongbao International Airport 贵阳龙洞堡国际机场
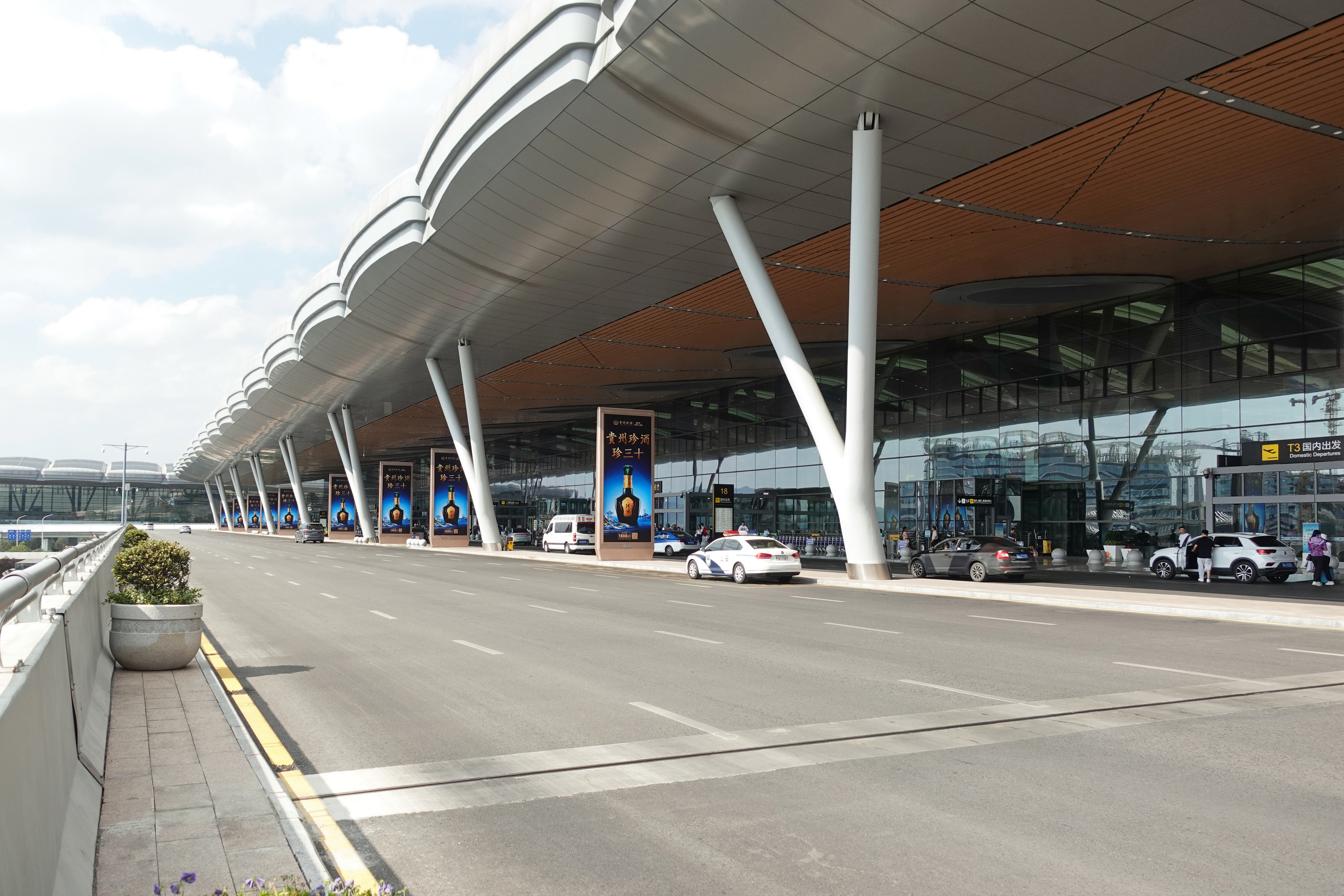
- Airport exterior in 2023
- IATA: KWE; ICAO: ZUGY

Summary
- Airport type: Public
- Serves: Guiyang
- Location: Nanming, Guiyang, Guizhou, China
- Opened: 28 May 1997; 29 years ago
- Hub for: Colorful Guizhou Airlines
- Focus city for: China Southern Airlines
- Elevation AMSL: 1,139 m (3,737 ft)
- Coordinates: 26°32′19″N 106°48′03″E
- Website: www.gyairport.com

Maps
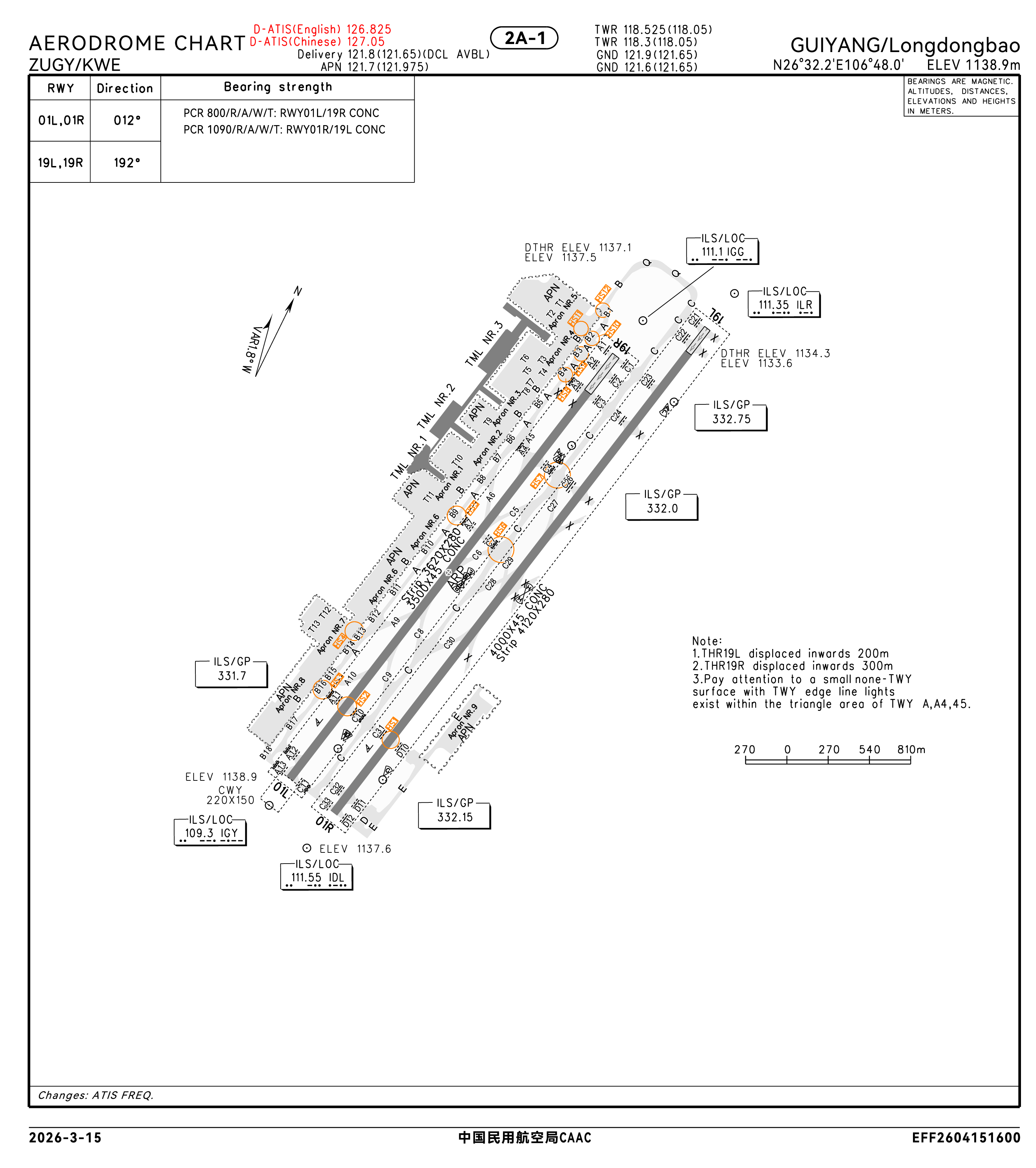
- CAAC airport chart

- Location in Guizhou Location in China

Runways
Direction	Length		Surface
Direction	m	ft	Surface
01L/19R	3,500	11,483	Concrete
01R/19L	4,000	13,123	Concrete

Statistics (2025)
- Passengers: 22,731,681 ▲1.9%
- Aircraft movements: 158,872 ▲0.8%
- Cargo: 119,268.0 ▲11.9%
- Source:, China's busiest airports by passenger traffic

Guiyang Longdongbao International Airport
- Simplified Chinese: 贵阳龙洞堡国际机场
- Traditional Chinese: 貴陽龍洞堡國際機場
Transcriptions
Standard Mandarin
- Hanyu Pinyin: Guìyáng Lóngdòngbǎo Guójì Jīchǎng

Guiyang Longdongbao International Airport (IATA: KWE, ICAO: ZUGY) is an international airport serving Guiyang, the capital of Southwest China's Guizhou province, and the hub for Colorful Guizhou Airlines. The airport was opened on 28 May 1997 and adopted its current name on 19 January 2006. It is located 11 km (6.8 mi) southeast from Guiyang's city center. It is about 4 km^{2} (1.5 sq mi) and has a 3,200-metre (10,500 ft) long, 45-metre (148 ft) wide runway, which can accommodate Boeing 747 or Airbus A330 widebody aircraft. The terminal is about 34,000 m^{2} (370,000 sq ft), available for over 2000 passengers departing and arriving per hour.

In 2025, Guiyang Longdongbao International Airport was the 23rd busiest airport in mainland China, with 30,253,675 passengers.

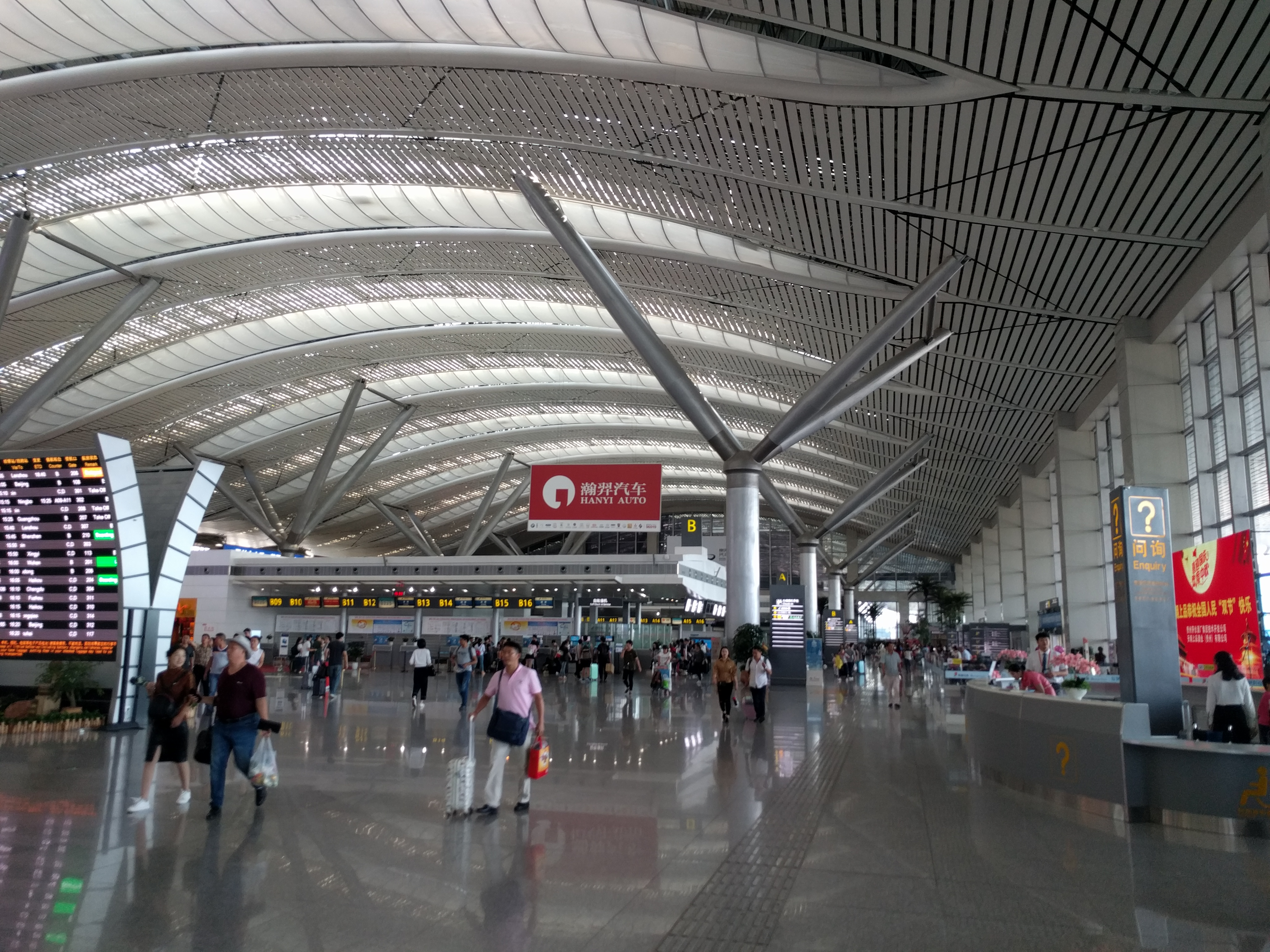
Guiyang Longdongbao Airport departure hall

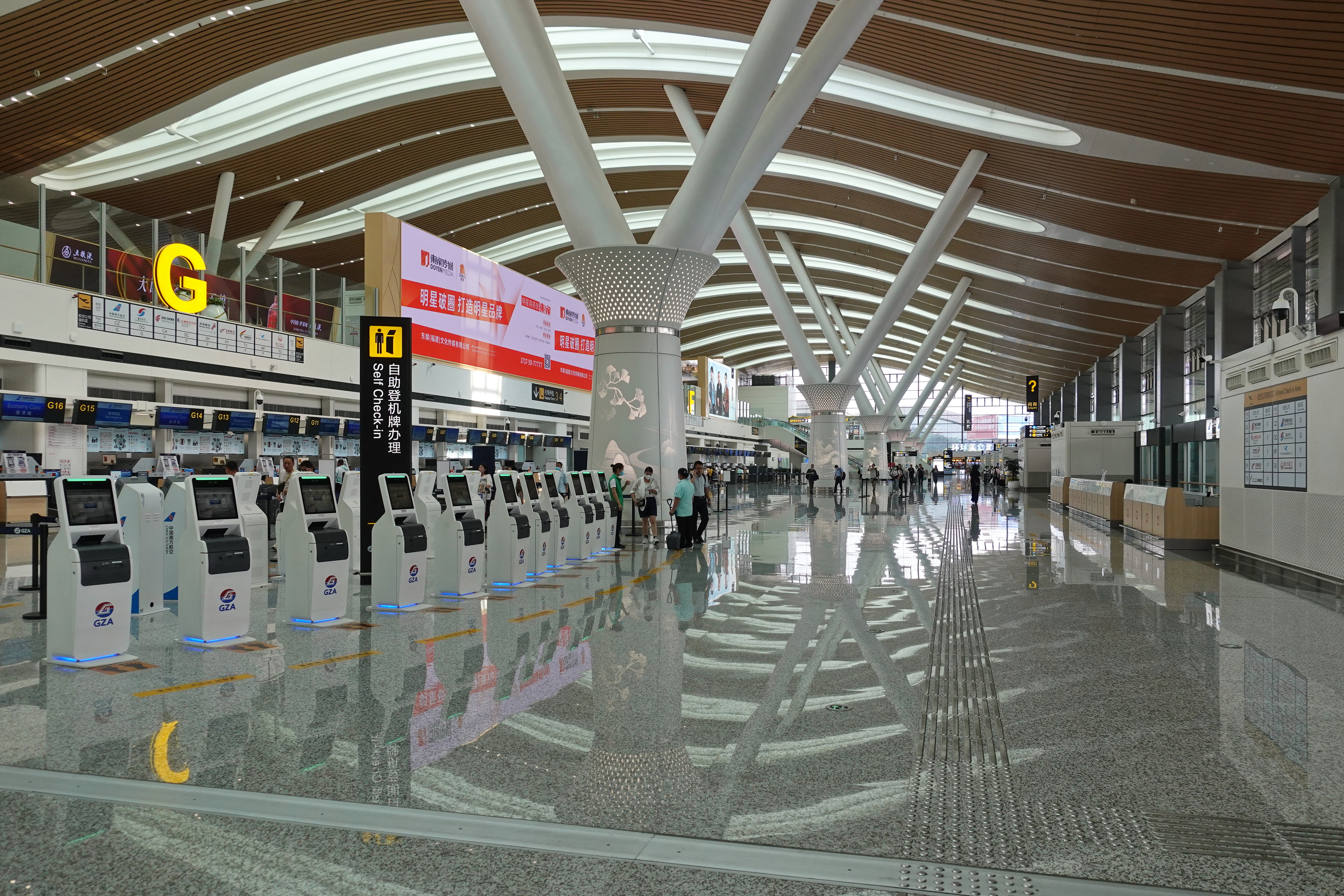
Guiyang Longdongbao International Airport T3 departure hall

== Expansion ==
In 2010, Guiyang Airport exceeded its design capacity of 5 million passengers per year. An airport expansion project, with a total investment of about 3.4 billion yuan, was authorized and started in September 2010. The aim was to take the total annual passenger capacity to 15.5 million and the cargo traffic to 220 thousand tons per year.

Hainan Airlines began a weekly flight to Paris, France, on 24 March 2019, opening up Guiyang and Guizhou Province to international long-haul air travel for the first time.

=== A-CDM ===
In June 2017, Guiyang airport worked with the aviation data service company VariFlight to implement an Airport Collaborative Decision Making system (A-CDM). The main purpose of this system is to improve on-time performance and safety of the airport's operations.

== Airlines and destinations ==
=== Passenger ===
Airlines	Destinations
9 Air	Bangkok–Suvarnabhumi, Fuzhou, Haikou, Harbin, Kuala Lumpur–International, Nanjing, Nantong, Ningbo, Seoul–Incheon, Shenyang, Wenzhou, Wuxi, Xiamen, Yinchuan, Zhengzhou; Charter: Kota Kinabalu, Kuching
Air Chang'an	Ningbo, Quanzhou, Wenzhou, Xi'an
Air China	Beijing–Capital, Beijing–Daxing, Chengdu–Tianfu, Dalian, Hangzhou, Hohhot, Shanghai–Pudong, Shenzhen, Tianjin, Wenzhou, Wuhan, Xiamen, Yuncheng
Air Guilin	Haikou, Wuhu, Xuzhou
Air Macau	Macau
Batik Air Malaysia	Charter: Kuala Lumpur–International
Beijing Capital Airlines	Haikou, Hangzhou, Lijiang, Qingdao, Sanya, Wenzhou, Xi'an, Yancheng, Yichang
Chengdu Airlines	Lijiang, Lüliang, Shenyang, Wenzhou
China Eastern Airlines	Beijing–Daxing, Dalian, Enshi, Hangzhou, Hefei, Nanjing, Ningbo, Shanghai–Hongqiao, Shanghai–Pudong, Taiyuan, Wuhan, Xi'an
China Express Airlines	Changde, Dazhou, Guangyuan, Hanzhong, Hohhot, Jingzhou, Lancang, Luoyang, Mangshi, Ordos, Qionghai, Quzhou, Tianjin, Tongren, Wuhan, Wushan, Yan'an, Yantai, Yichang, Yinchuan, Zhangjiajie, Zhanjiang, Zhengzhou, Zunyi–Maotai
China Southern Airlines	Bangkok–Suvarnabhumi, Beijing–Daxing, Changchun, Changsha, Dalian, Guangzhou, Haikou, Hangzhou, Harbin, Heze, Jieyang, Lanzhou, Linyi, Nanjing, Ningbo, Qingdao, Sanya, Shanghai–Hongqiao, Shanghai–Pudong, Shenyang, Shenzhen, Taipei–Taoyuan, Taizhou, Urumqi, Wenzhou, Wuhan, Xiamen, Xining, Yinchuan, Yiwu, Zhengzhou, Zhuhai
Chongqing Airlines	Hangzhou, Wuhan
Colorful Guizhou Airlines	Beijing–Daxing, Changzhou, Fuyang, Hangzhou, Hefei, Huai'an, Jinan, Lianyungang, Libo, Lishui, Mangshi, Nanjing, Ningbo, Quanzhou, Sanya, Seoul-Incheon, Shenyang, Taizhou, Tianjin, Tongren, Xi'an, Xichang, Xingyi, Xishuangbanna, Yiwu, Zhengzhou
Dalian Airlines	Dalian
Donghai Airlines	Nantong, Xishuangbanna
Fuzhou Airlines	Fuzhou, Harbin, Xi'an
GX Airlines	Jining
Hainan Airlines	Beijing–Capital, Dalian, Haikou, Hohhot, Lanzhou, Milan–Malpensa, Paris–Charles de Gaulle, Sanya, Shenzhen, Shijiazhuang, Xi'an
Hebei Airlines	Beijing–Daxing, Longnan, Shijiazhuang
HK Express	Hong Kong
Jiangxi Air	Nanchang
Juneyao Air	Chifeng, Hangzhou, Huizhou, Lanzhou, Nanjing, Shanghai–Hongqiao, Shanghai–Pudong, Xi'an
Kunming Airlines	Nanjing, Taiyuan, Xishuangbanna
LJ Air	Harbin, Yinchuan
Loong Air	Ganzhou, Hangzhou, Jiaxing, Ningbo, Wenzhou
Lucky Air	Dali, Lijiang, Ningbo, Xuzhou, Yancheng, Zhengzhou
Pacific Airlines	Charter: Nha Trang
Qingdao Airlines	Changchun, Hefei, Jinan, Qingdao, Wenzhou
Ruili Airlines	Changzhou, Mangshi, Wuxi
Scoot	Singapore
Shandong Airlines	Changchun, Changzhou, Dalian, Harbin, Hefei, Jinan, Nanjing, Qingdao, Shenyang, Shiyan, Taiyuan, Wuhan, Xiamen, Xi'an, Yantai, Yangzhou, Zhengzhou
Shanghai Airlines	Changchun, Shanghai–Hongqiao, Shanghai–Pudong, Zhengzhou
Shenzhen Airlines	Harbin, Nanjing, Nantong, Wuxi
Sichuan Airlines	Hangzhou, Harbin, Lanzhou, Sanya, Wenzhou, Xi'an, Xuzhou
Sky Angkor Airlines	Seasonal charter: Siem Reap
Spring Airlines	Ningbo, Shanghai–Hongqiao, Shanghai–Pudong, Shijiazhuang, Yangzhou
Suparna Airlines	Fuzhou, Haikou, Shanghai–Pudong, Shenzhen
Tianjin Airlines	Chizhou, Haikou, Hengyang, Hohhot, Huizhou, Nanjing, Qingdao, Quanzhou, Singapore, Tianjin, Urumqi, Xi'an, Xingyi, Xuzhou, Yangzhou, Yichang, Yulin (Shaanxi), Zhengzhou
Tibet Airlines	Lhasa
TransNusa	Charter: Jakarta–Soekarno-Hatta
VietJet Air	Charter: Nha Trang
West Air	Hefei, Lhasa, Nanjing, Zhengzhou
XiamenAir	Fuzhou, Hangzhou, Quanzhou, Xiamen

== Other facilities ==
China Express Airlines was previously headquartered on the grounds of Guiyang Longdongbao International Airport.

== Traffic and statistics ==
Year	Rank of total passengers	Total passengers	Rank of total cargo	Total cargo (tonnes)	Rank of total aircraft movements	Total aircraft movements
2000	25	1,389,477	30	14,312.3	24	21,286
2001	24	1,529,857	29	17,110.6	26	21,986
2002	24	1,748,848	28	23,308.3	24	25,040
2003	23	1,976,768	26	24,106.0	24	25,972
2004	23	2,719,799	24	30,018.9	23	32,482
2005	23	3,125,390	25	33,311.0	25	35,318
2006	24	3,717,999	24	39,713.1	24	43,205
2007	25	4,248,005	25	39,730.0	23	47,685
2008	26	4,324,085	25	41,967.9	27	46,259
2009	25	5,687,652	25	51,619.0	26	57,354
2010	26	6,271,701	26	61,653.0	27	61,231
2011	25	7,339,228	25	69,130.3	27	67,759
2012	23	8,764,034	25	79,586.5	27	77,173
2013	22	10,472,589	26	77,425.2	23	93,646
2014	22	12,525,537	26	82,063.4	22	113,424
2015	23	13,244,982	26	87,207.0	23	116,914
2016	23	15,105,225	28	95,898.6	22	129,001

== Ground transportation ==
=== Guiyang Metro ===
A metro station, Longdongbao International Airport station on Line 2 (Guiyang Metro) serves the airport.

=== China Railway ===
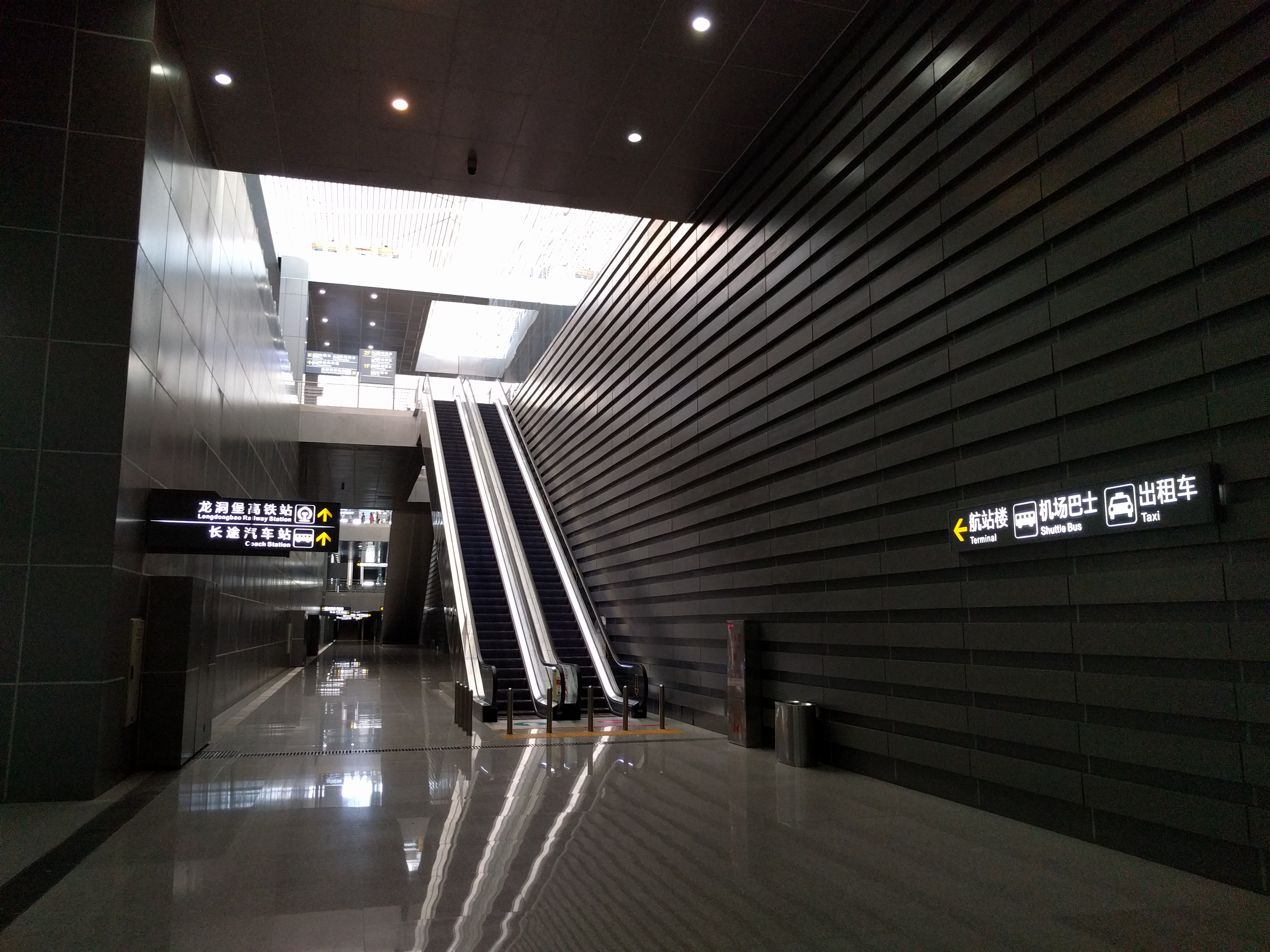
Longdongbao Railway Station

The airport is served by Longdongbao railway station, situated underneath the airport.

== See also ==
- List of airports in China
- List of the busiest airports in China
