= Airport collaborative decision making =

Information technology paradigm at certain aerodromes

Airport Collaborative Decision Making (A-CDM or ACDM) is the implementation of the CDM process for enhancing the airport turnaround and fostering collaboration between the stakeholders. Collaborative Decision Making (CDM) is defined by the International Civil Aviation Organization (ICAO) as a process applied to support other activities such as demand/capacity balancing. CDM can be applied across the timeline of activities from strategic planning to real-time operations. CDM is not an objective but a way to reach the performance objectives of the processes it supports. The various industry stakeholders are supporting A-CDM optimization, such as ACI World, CANSO, and IATA.

== ICAO Framework ==
The ICAO Global Air Navigation Plan (GANP) (Doc 9750) has addressed A-CDM in the Aviation System Block Upgrade (ASBU) modules B0-ACDM and B1-ACDM. Each block identifies targeted timelines for the operational improvements associated with A-CDM implementation. B0-ACDM is achieved when operation data are shared among different airport stakeholders to reduce the delay of data transfer and enhance safety, efficiency, and situational awareness. The B1-ACDM target is the enhancement of the planning and management of airport operations and allow their full integration for ATM using performance targets compliant with those of the surrounding airspace.

These modules are in line with the concepts and capabilities described in the Global Air Traffic Management Operational Concept (GATMOC, Doc 9854) and the Manual on Air Traffic Management System Requirements (Doc 9882).

== Process ==
The process involves the establishment of a target start approval time (TSAT), target off block time (TOBT) and target take off time (TTOT) for each flight.

== A-CDM in Europe ==
Airport Collaborative Decision Making (A-CDM) is a joint initiative that aims to improve the operational efficiency of all airport operators. It is a joint venture between ACI EUROPE, EUROCONTROL, International Air Transport Association (IATA) and the Civil Air Navigation Services Organisation (CANSO). It seeks to reduce delays, increase the predictability of events during a flight and optimise the utilisation of resources. A-CDM is now fully integrated to the Single European Sky (SES) regulations of the European Union defining binding objectives and requirements for the member states and the industry. The tactic is to improve real-time information sharing between airport operators, aircraft operators, ground handlers and air traffic control by modifying operational procedures and automating processes.

By the end of 2020, A-CDM was expected to be fully implemented in the 30 European airports. The first local A-CDM initiatives started in 2005. A-CDM platforms were initially deployed at pilot airports including Paris-Charles de Gaulle and Brussels Airport (2010). The list of A-CDM airports numbered 15 by 2015, rising to 20 in 2016, with 15 further airports starting the process.

== ACDM in the United States ==
In the United States, the Air Traffic Organization (ATO) of the Federal Aviation Administration (FAA) has implemented CDM primarily with the air carriers to improve Air Traffic Management (ATM). The FAA-Industry Executive Committee (EC) of CDM and the NAS Customer Forum (NCF), formerly known as the CDM Stakeholders Group (CSG), has worked on including airport operators in the implementation effort. Airports and their stakeholders are also acquiring capabilities comparable to those of A-CDM airports in Europe. For instance, the deployment of NextGen innovations such as the Terminal Flight Data Manager (TFDM) and the Traffic Flow Management System (TFMS) by the FAA at large hub airports provide tools to air traffic control towers comparable to the pre-departure sequencer (PDS) functionalities at European airports. The Transportation Research Board has also released guidance for the implementation of ACDM at US airports.

== A-CDM airports ==
=== Americas ===
- São Paulo International Airport (Guarulhos) (GRU)
- Toronto Pearson International Airport (YYZ)

=== Europe ===
By the end of 2020, A-CDM was fully implemented in 30 European airports:

- Amsterdam (AMS)
- Barcelona (BCN)
- Berlin Brandenburg (BER)
- Brussels (BRU)
- Copenhagen (CPH)
- Düsseldorf (DUS)
- Frankfurt (FRA)
- Geneva (GVA)
- Hamburg (HAM)
- Helsinki (HEL)
- Lisbon (LIS)
- London Gatwick (LGW)
- London Heathrow (LHR)
- Lyon (LYS)
- Madrid (MAD)
- Milan Linate (LIN)
- Milan Malpensa (MXP)
- Milan Orio al Serio - Bergamo (BGY)
- Munich (MUC)
- Naples (NAP)
- Oslo Gardermoen (OSL)
- Palma de Mallorca (PMI)
- Paris Charles De Gaulle (CDG)
- Paris Orly (ORY)
- Prague (PRG)
- Rome Fiumicino (FCO)
- Stockholm Arlanda (ARN)
- Stuttgart (STR)
- Warsaw (WAW)
- Venice (VCE)
- Zurich (ZRH)

=== Asia ===
- Incheon (Seoul) (ICN)
- New Delhi (DEL)
- Mumbai (BOM)
- Bangalore (BLR)
- Kolkata (CCU)
- Chennai (MAA)
- Ahmedabad (AMD)
- Jaipur (JAI)
- Thiruvananthapuram (TRV)
- Guwahati (GAU)
- Singapore (SIN)
- Hong Kong (HKG)
- Shanghai Pudong (PVG)
- Beijing Capital (PEK)
- Kunming (KMG)
- Guiyang (KWE)
- KLIA Malaysia (KUL)
- Bangkok Suvarnabhumi (BKK) (on trial)
- Bangkok Don Mueang (DMK) (on trial)
- Noibai International Airport (HAN) (on trial)
- Tan Son Nhat International Airport (SGN) (on trial)

=== Oceania ===
- Melbourne Airport (MEL)
- Sydney Airport (SYD)
- Brisbane Airport (BNE)
- Perth Airport (PER)
- Auckland Airport (AKL)
- Wellington Airport (WLG)
