= Colorful Guizhou Airlines =

Chinese low-cost airline

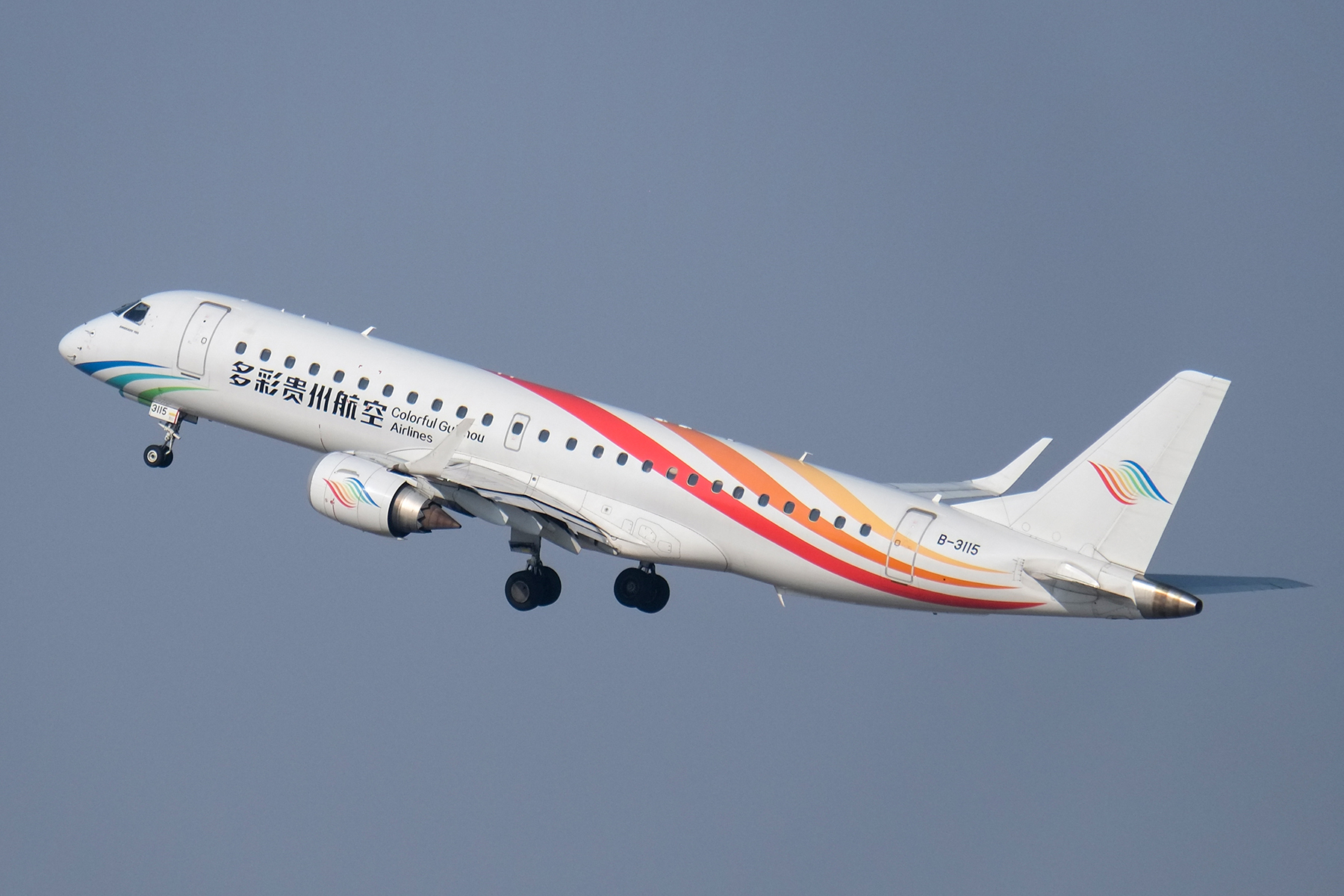
IATA	ICAO	Call sign
GY	CGZ	COLORFUL
- Founded: 2015; 11 years ago
- Commenced operations: 31 December 2015; 10 years ago
- Hubs: Guiyang Longdongbao International Airport
- Fleet size: 20
- Destinations: 45
- Headquarters: Guiyang, Guizhou, China
- Key people: Zhai Yan, chairman Xu Bo, general manager
- Website: cgzair.com

Colorful Guizhou Airlines
- Simplified Chinese: 多彩贵州航空公司
- Traditional Chinese: 多彩貴州航空公司
Transcriptions
Standard Mandarin
- Hanyu Pinyin: Duōcǎi Guìzhōu Hángkōng Yǒuxiàngōngsī

Colorful Guizhou Airlines is a low-cost Chinese regional airline with its headquarters in Guiyang, Guizhou, and with its fleet based at Guiyang Longdongbao International Airport. It is intended to improve air service in Western China, particularly Guizhou Province. It is the first locally owned airline in the province. The airline commenced flights in December 2015, operating Embraer 190s to destinations throughout the country.

== History ==
On 18 May 2015, the Civil Aviation Administration of China (CAAC) granted Guizhou Industrial Investment (Group) Co., Ltd. and Weining County Construction Investment Group preliminary approval to jointly establish Duocai Guizhou Airlines. The airline was officially established as Colorful Guizhou Airlines on 19 June 2015.

The name "Colorful Guizhou" comes from a marketing campaign by the provincial government; it signifies the cultural diversity within Guizhou Province.

On 15 June 2015, the airline placed an order for 17 Embraer 190 aircraft, 7 of which were firm orders and the other 10 options. If all options are exercised, the transaction will be valued at US$834 million. Colorful Guizhou Airlines hopes to expand its fleet to 30 aircraft by 2020 and 120–140 aircraft in the future.

On 5 December 2015, the airline received its first Embraer 190, followed by a second aircraft on 18 December. It filed an application for an air operator's certificate from the CAAC on 15 December.

On 31 December 2015, Colorful Guizhou Airlines commenced operations with a flight from its hub Guiyang to Bijie. It plans to add flights to Chengdu and Tongren.

On 24 October 2019, Colorful Guizhou Airlines received its first Airbus A320neo, which by March 2020 would become a firm two Airbus A320neos in its official fleet.

== Corporate affairs ==
Colorful Guizhou Airlines is a joint venture between Guizhou Industrial Investment (Group) Co., Ltd. (95%), and Weining County Construction Investment Group (5%). The groups invested a total of RMB 1 billion in the airline.

The chairman of the airline is Zhai Yan, who is also chairman of Guizhou Industrial Investment Group.

== Destinations ==
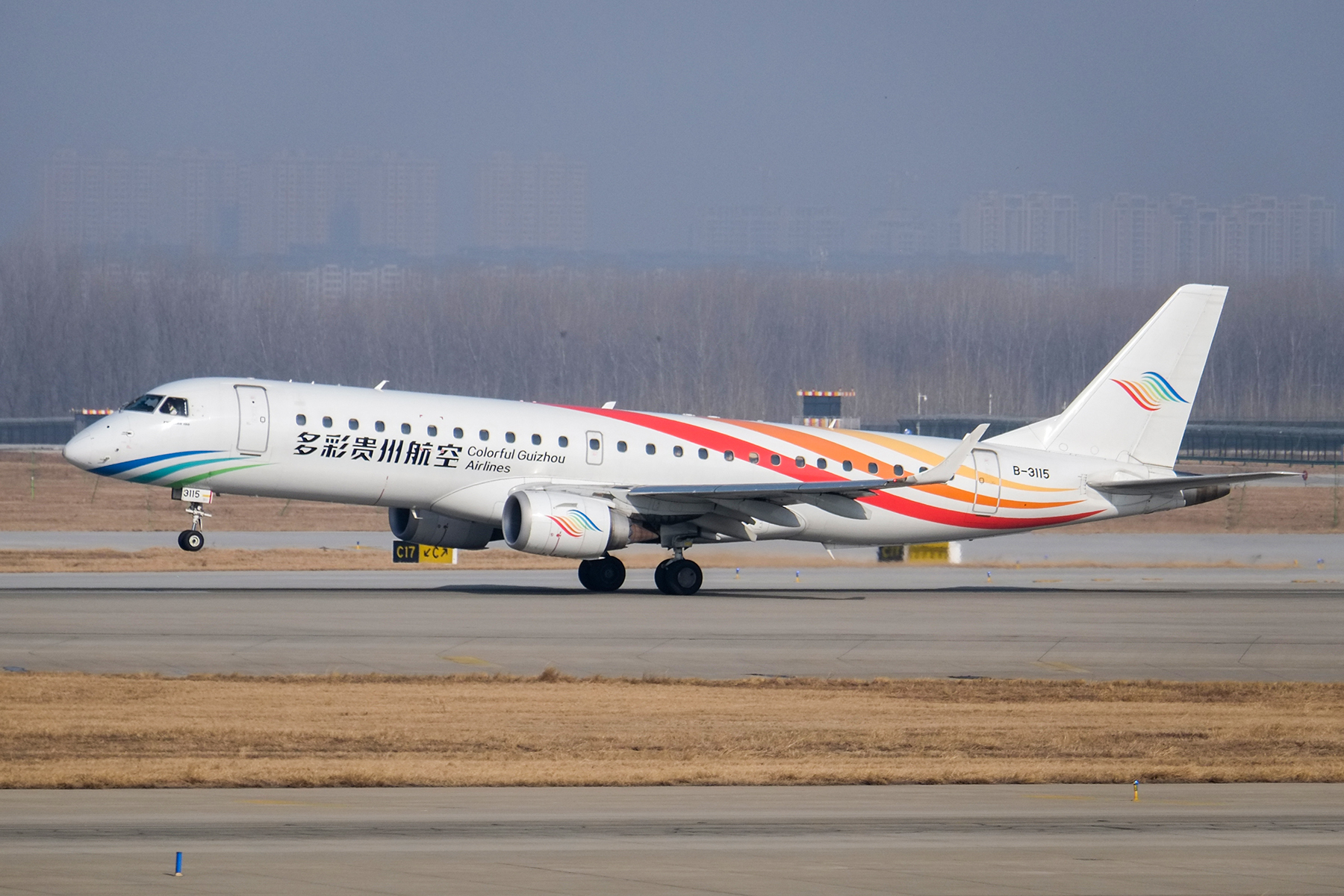
An Embraer 190 of Colorful Guizhou Airlines taking-off at Zhengzhou Xinzheng International Airport

As of June 2026, the airlines serves destinations in China, Vietnam and South Korea.

== Fleet ==
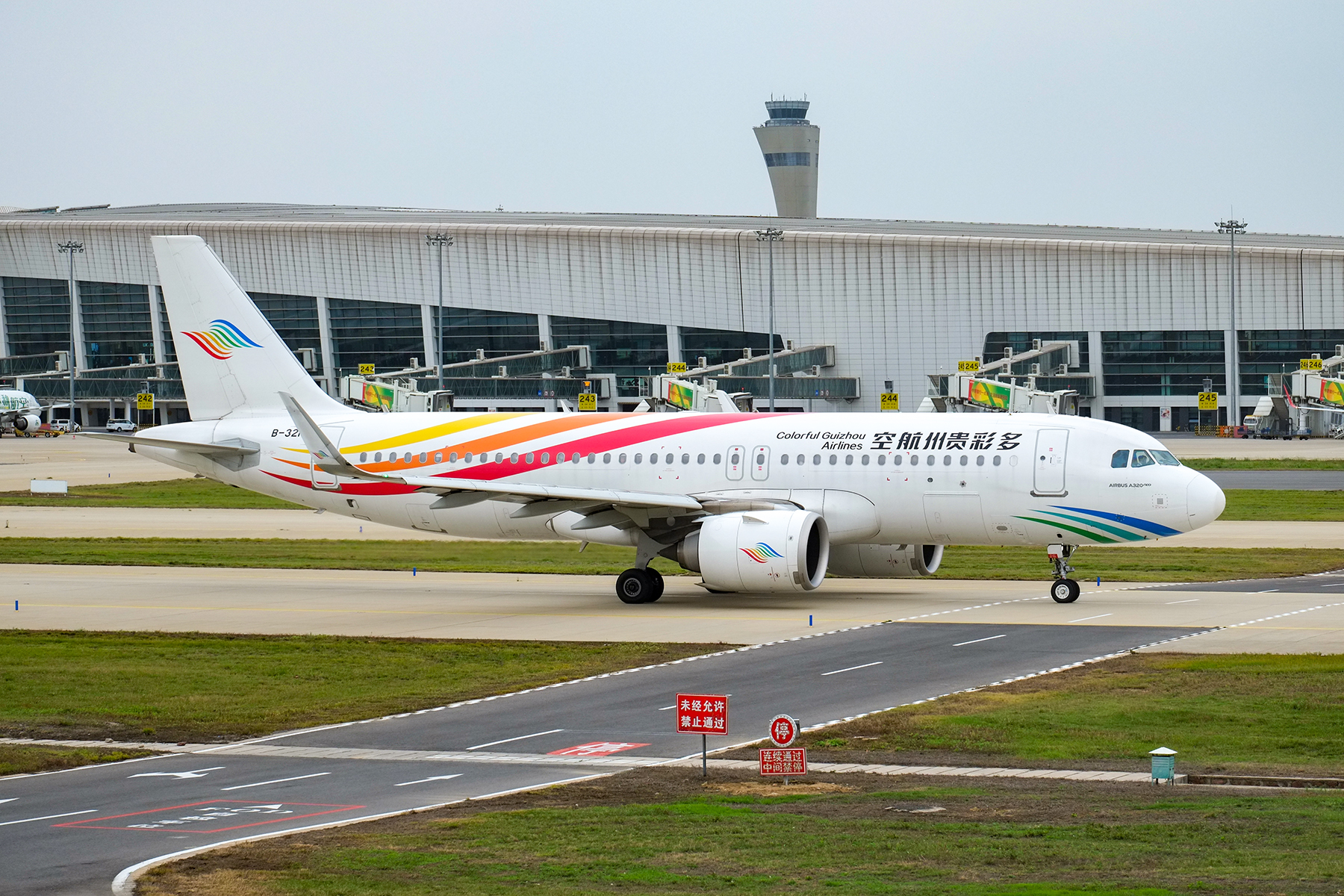
Airbus A320neo

As of August 2025, Colorful Guizhou Airlines operates the following aircraft:

Aircraft	In Service	Orders	Passengers			Notes
Aircraft	In Service	Orders	C	Y	Total	Notes
Airbus A320neo	11	—	8	162	170	
Embraer E190LR	9	—	—	104	104	
Embraer E190LR	9	—	3	108	111	
Comac C909	—	20	TBA			
Total	20	—				
