= Guangzhou Baiyun International Airport =

Airport serving Guangzhou, Guangdong, China

Guangzhou Baiyun International Airport 广州白云国际机场

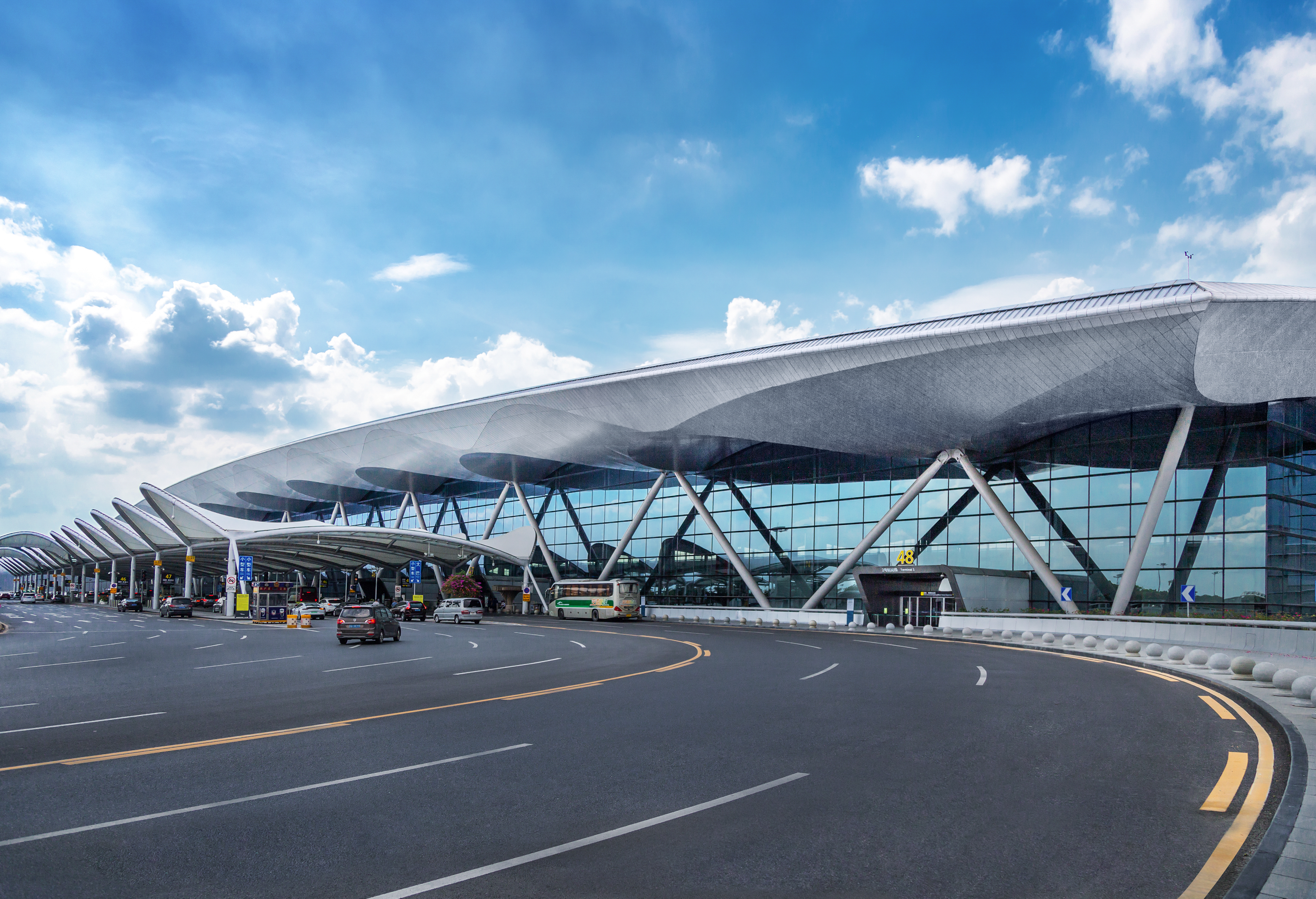
- Terminal 2
- IATA: CAN; ICAO: ZGGG; WMO: 59287

Summary
- Airport type: Public
- Owner: Guangzhou Baiyun International Airport Co. Ltd.
- Operator: Guangdong Airport Authority
- Serves: Pearl River Delta
- Location: Huadu and Baiyun districts, Guangzhou, Guangdong, China
- Opened: 5 August 2004; 22 years ago
- Hub for: 9 Air; China Southern Airlines; FedEx Express; Hainan Airlines; Shenzhen Airlines
- Focus city for: China Eastern Airlines
- Time zone: China Standard Time (UTC+08:00)
- Elevation AMSL: 15 m (49 ft)
- Coordinates: 23°23′33″N 113°17′56″E
- Website: www.baiyunairport.com

Maps
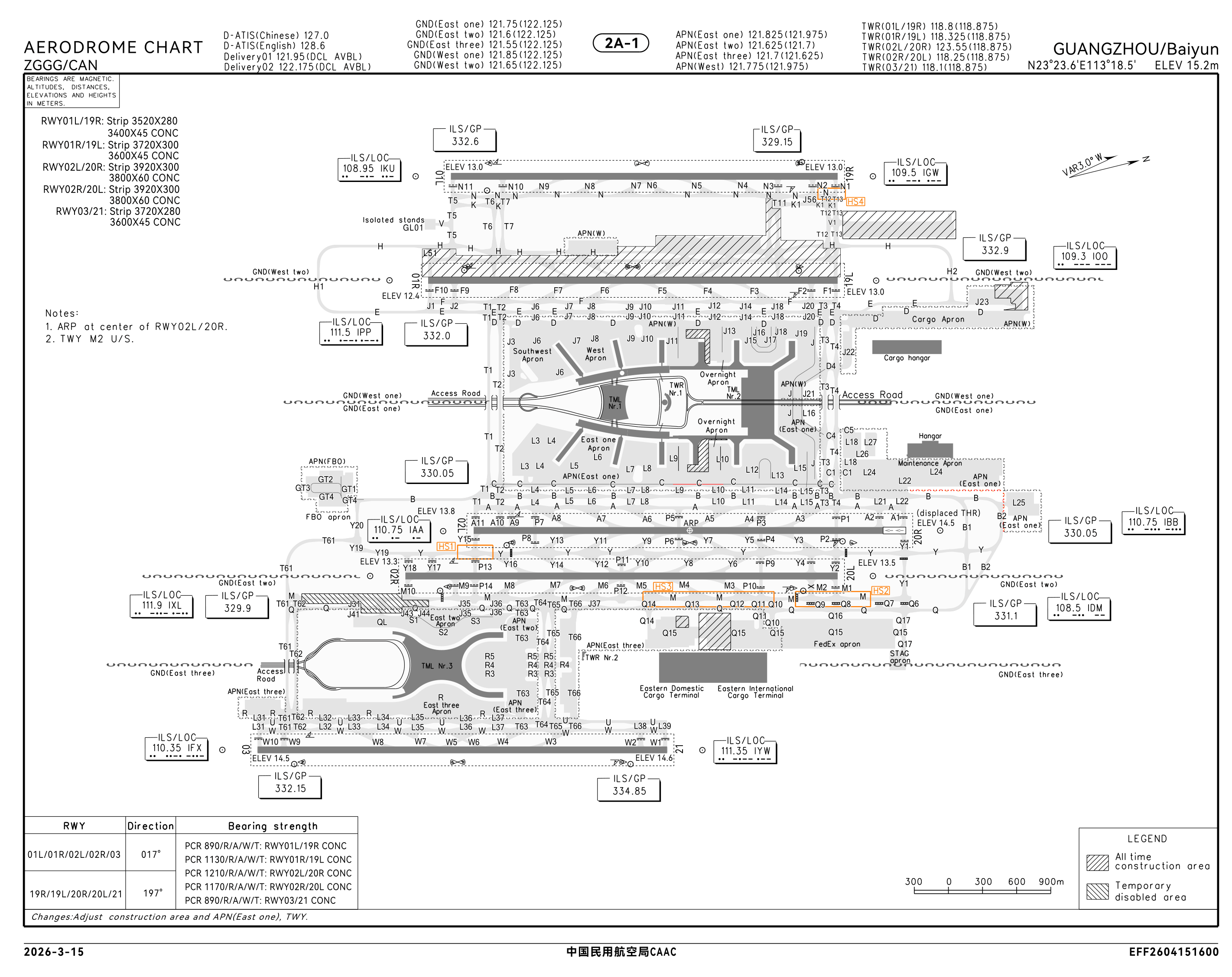
- CAAC airport diagram

- Location in Guangdong Location in China

Runways
Direction	Length		Surface
Direction	m	ft	Surface
01L/19R	3,400	11,155	Concrete
01R/19L	3,600	11,811	Concrete
02L/20R	3,800	12,467	Concrete
02R/20L	3,800	12,467	Concrete
03/21	3,600	11,811	Concrete

Statistics (2025)
- Passenger volume: 83,582,952 ▲9.5%
- Rank (world): 9th
- Cargo (metric tonnes): 2,439,247.5 ▲2.4%
- Aircraft movements: 550,512 ▲7.5%
- Sources: Civil Aviation Administration of China, List of the busiest airports in the People's Republic of China

Guangzhou Baiyun International Airport
- Simplified Chinese: 广州白云国际机场
- Traditional Chinese: 廣州白雲國際機場
Transcriptions
Standard Mandarin
- Hanyu Pinyin: Guǎngzhōu Báiyún Guójì Jīchǎng
Yue: Cantonese
- Yale Romanization: Gwóngjāu Baahkwàhn Gwokjai Gēichèuhng

Guangzhou Baiyun International Airport (IATA: CAN, ICAO: ZGGG) is an international airport serving Guangzhou, Guangdong, China.

The airport codes were inherited from the former Baiyun Airport, and the IATA code is derived from Guangzhou's historical romanization Canton. Baiyun Airport serves as a hub for China Southern Airlines, FedEx Express, 9 Air, Hainan Airlines and Shenzhen Airlines. In 2020, due to the impact of the COVID-19 pandemic on aviation in other countries, it was temporarily the world's busiest airport by passenger traffic, handling 43.8 million passengers.

In 2023, Guangzhou Baiyun International Airport was the world's twelfth-busiest airport by passenger traffic, with 63.1 million passengers handled, and the busiest in China. As for cargo traffic, the airport was China's second-busiest and the world's eleventh-busiest. In the first quarter of 2026, Baiyun Airport served total 22.539 million passengers (4.784 million passengers are international), surpassing Pudong Airport with 21.739 million passengers (8.1046 million passengers are international). In the first half of year 2026, the total passengers throughput of Baiyun Airport reached 43.333 million passengers.

Baiyun Airport is certified as a 4-Star airport, while Terminal 2 is classified as a 5-Star Airport Terminal by Skytrax. Baiyun Airport is the first airport in China certified 4F-class standard and also the first airport 4F-class in China with 5 commercial runways in operation.

== Overview ==
=== 1932–2004 ===
The old Baiyun Airport opened in 1932. Due to the expansion of Guangzhou, the airport could not expand to meet passengers needs as buildings and mountains surrounded the airport. On 5 August 2004, the new Baiyun Airport opened and the old airport was closed.

=== Since 2004 ===
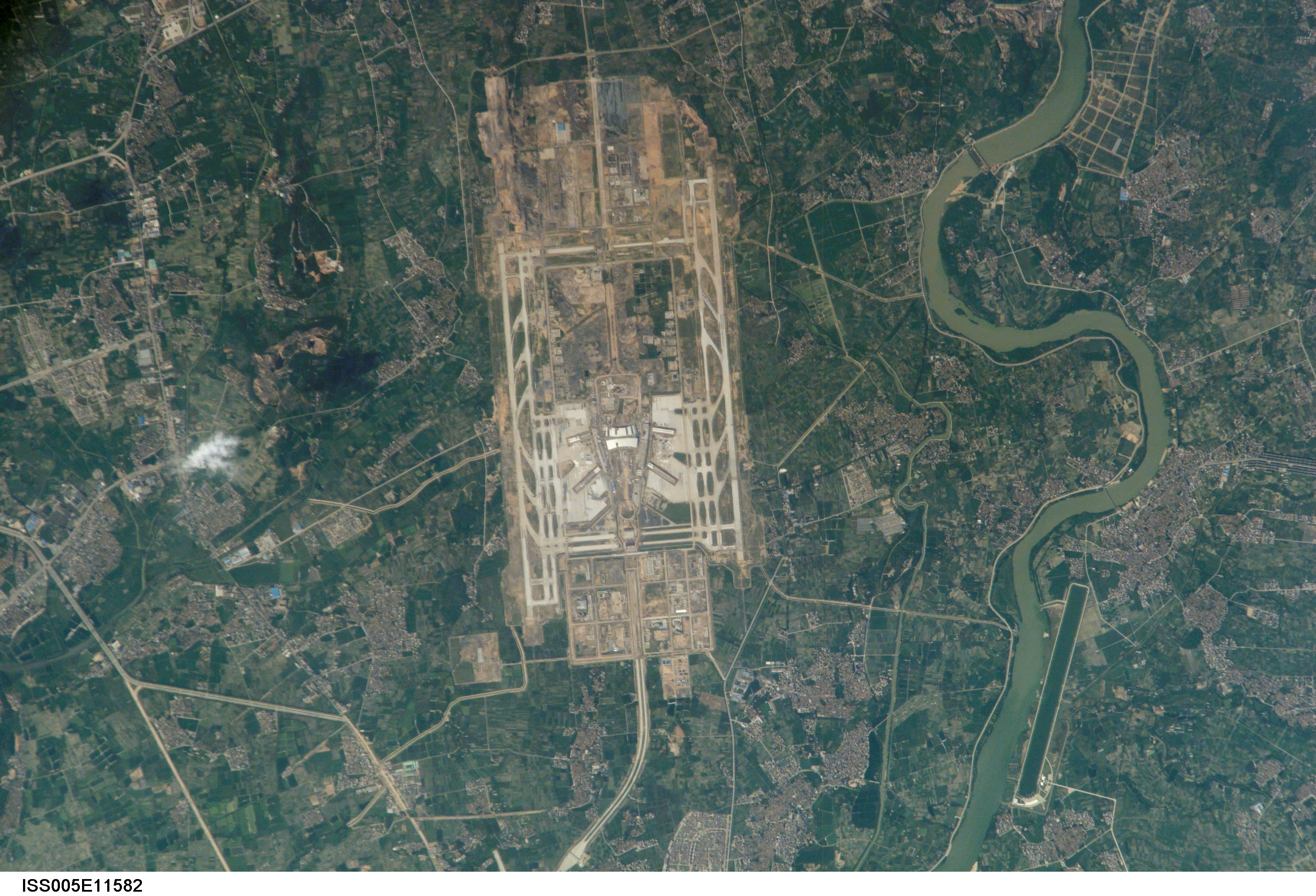
The current Baiyun Airport during construction, as seen from the International Space Station (August 2002)

The current airport is located in the outskirts of Guangzhou's Baiyun District and Huadu District and opened on 5 August 2004 as a replacement for the 72-year-old, identically named former airport, which is now closed. Built at a cost of 19.8 billion yuan, the new airport is 28 kilometres (17 mi) north of downtown Guangzhou and nearly five times larger than its predecessor. "Baiyun" (白云) means "white cloud" in Chinese and refers to the Baiyun Mountain (Baiyunshan), near the former airport even though the mountain is much closer to downtown Guangzhou than it is to the new airport. It is also referred to as "New Baiyun" to distinguish it from the previous airport, but this is not a part of the official name. Former curfews and restrictions did not apply to the new airport, so it could operate 24 hours a day, allowing China Southern Airlines to maximise intercontinental route utilisation with overnight flights. Other airlines also benefit from the removal of previous restrictions.

Airport layout with expansions

In August 2008, the airport's expansion plan was approved by the National Development and Reform Commission which included a third runway, 3,800 metres (12,500 ft) in length and 60 metres (200 ft) in width, located 400 metres (1,300 ft) to the east of the existing east runway. The centrepiece of the project is a 880,700 m^{2} (9,480,000 sq ft) Terminal 2. Other facilities comprise new indoor and outdoor car parks and a transportation centre with metro and inter-city train services. The total cost of the entire project was estimated to be around ¥18.854 billion. Construction of the third runway began in 2012 and the runway commenced operation in early 2015. The whole project including the new terminal was scheduled to be finished in February 2018, at which time the airport will be able to handle 80 million passengers and 2.5 million tonnes of cargo a year.

The third phase expansion plan was approved by the National Development and Reform Commission of China. After the expansion, Baiyun Airport will have three terminals, a satellite concourse, five runways and a high-speed railway station serving 3 intercity railways. The airport will be able to handle 120 million passengers, 3.8 million tons freight and 775,000 aircraft movements a year. The whole expansion project is completed on 30 October 2025, with the fifth runway and Terminal 3.

== Data ==
- Runways: 5 — 3,800 metres (12,500 ft), 3,800 metres (12,500 ft), 3,600 metres (11,800 ft), 3,400 metres (11,200 ft) and 3,600 metres (11,800 ft)
- Airport area: 3,558 acres (14.4 km^{2})
- Aircraft parking bays: 173 (passenger apron and cargo apron)
- Current passenger capacity: 140 million passengers per year
- Current cargo capacity: 6 million tonne
- Destinations: More than 200 (mostly domestic)

== Facilities ==
=== Terminal 1 ===
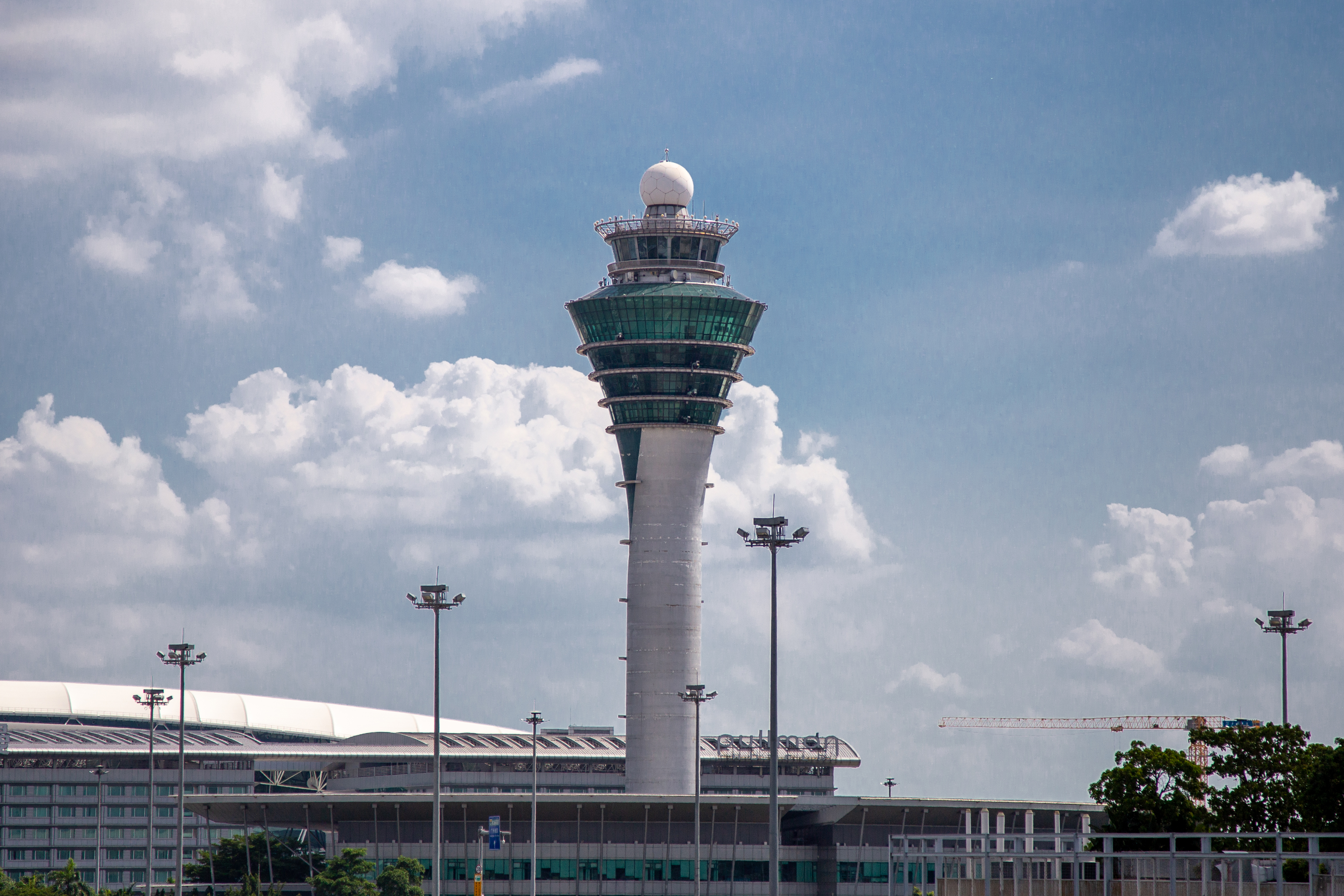
Airport control tower

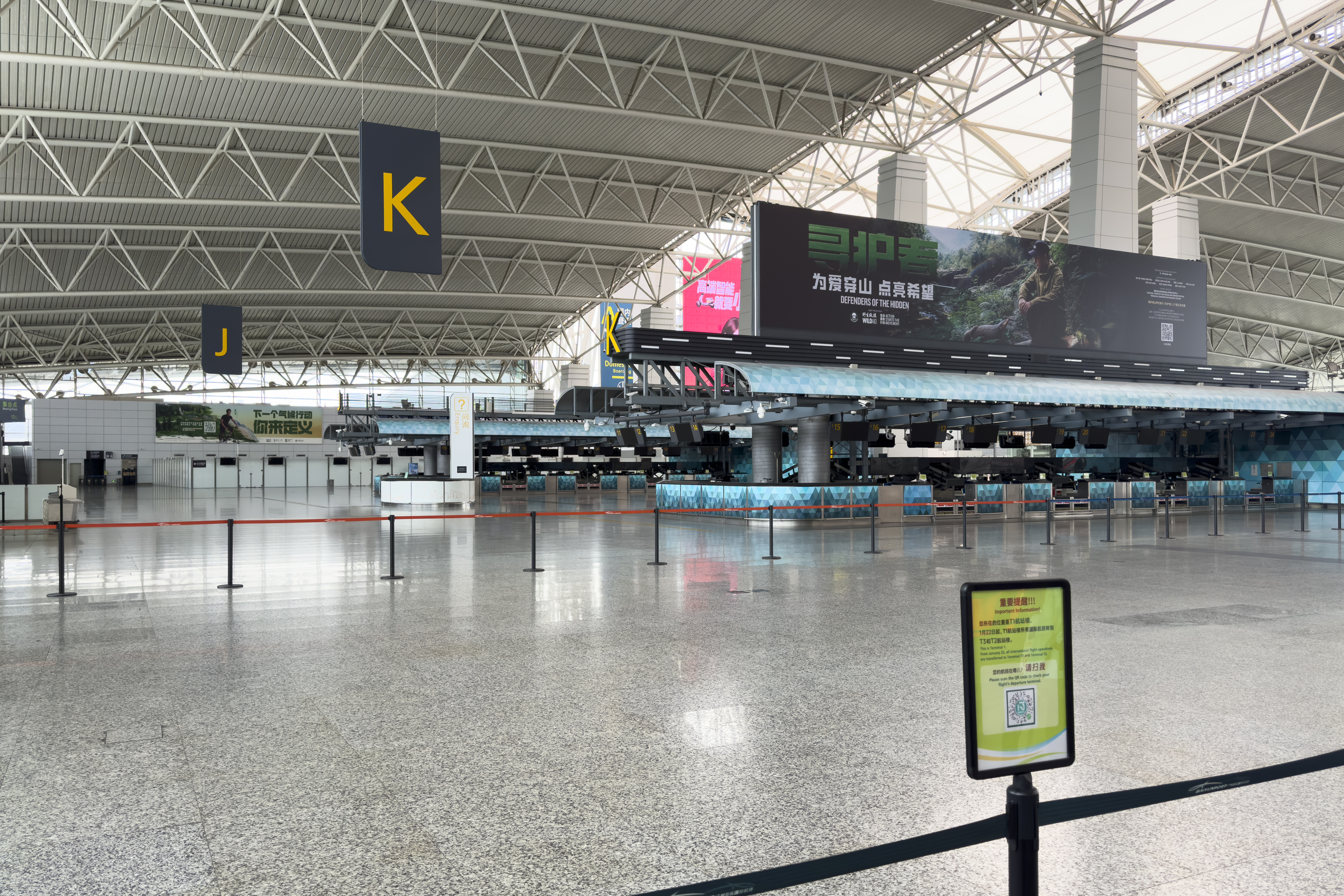
Terminal 1 Departures Hall

Terminal 1 has three components, Main Terminal, Area A and Area B. All check-in counters and most retail stores are placed at the Main Terminal. The two concourses controlled by individual security checkpoints, named Area A and Area B, are the boarding gates, security checkpoints, border control, customs and quarantine, baggage reclaim and relative facilities.

Since 24 January 2016, East Piers 1 and 2 are dedicated to serve international flights; domestic flights occupy the rest.

From 2:00 am on 7 May 2026, Terminal 1 is temporarily closed for renovation, and flights departing from Terminal 1 are moved to Terminal 2 or 3.

=== Terminal 2 ===
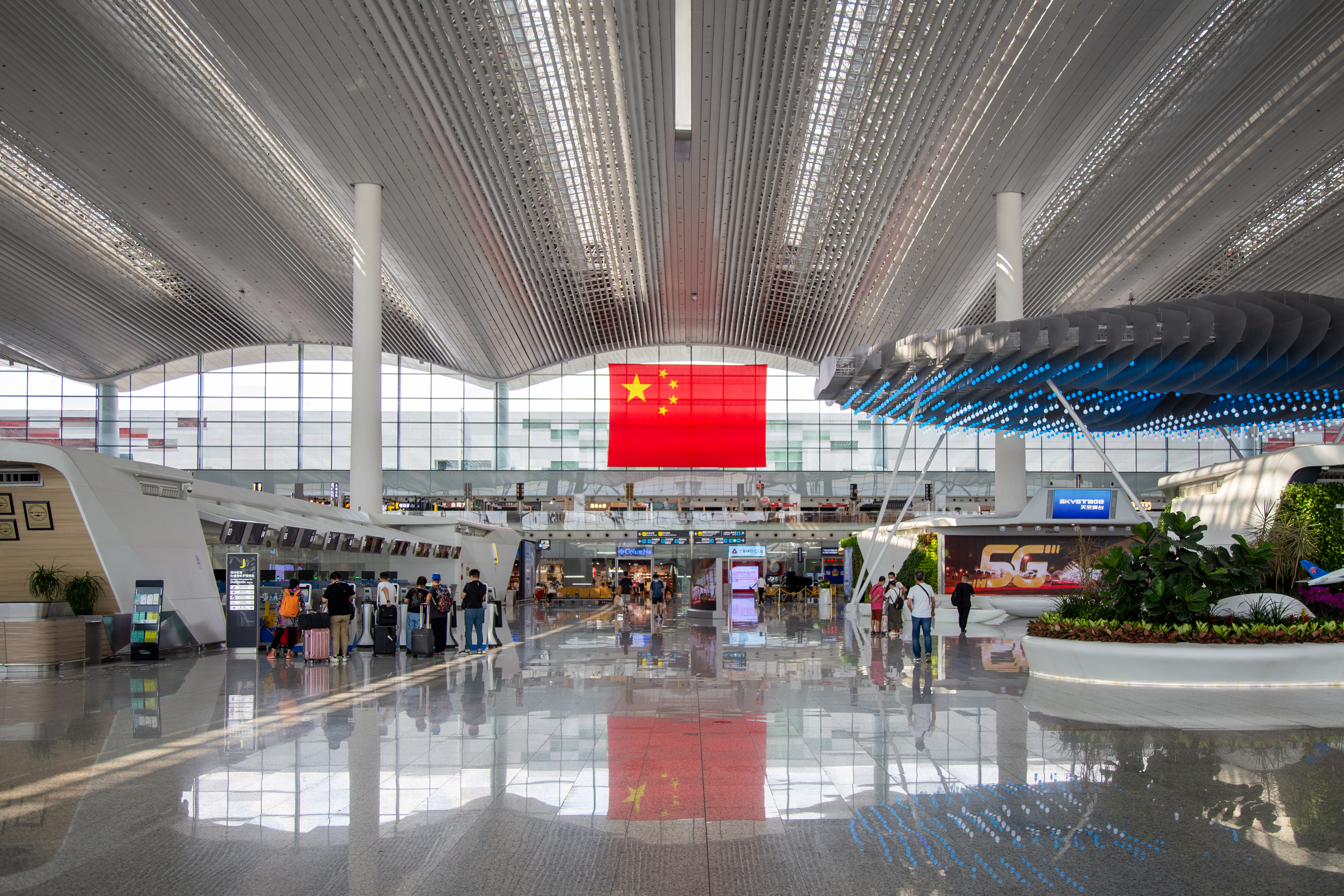
Terminal 2 Departures Hall

Terminal 2 opened on 26 April 2018, with an area measuring over 808,700 square metres, making it one of the world's largest airport terminal facilities, designed to handle over 45 million passengers annually. It offers more modern facilities than Terminal 1. It consists of 4 levels:

- Level 1: Arrival hall and baggage claim
- Level 2: Domestic departures/arrivals and international arrivals
- Level 3: Check-in hall and international departures
- Level 4: Commercial area featuring food courts and premium lounges, alongside Gates A168-A173

Terminal 2 consists of over 35 remote gates and 56 jetbridges. The western side of the terminal, known as the B gates, solely serves domestic flights. The eastern side of the terminal, known as the A gates, solely serve international flights. Gates 168 to 173, located in the centre of the terminal, are swing gates and can serve both international (A) and domestic (B) flights as these gates are on multiple levels. Terminal 2 is currently the main hub of China Southern Airlines, and previously served the majority of SkyTeam and Star Alliance member airlines, before the big switch in 2026. Terminal 2 is classified as a 5-Star Airport Terminal by Skytrax.

The new transport centre (GTC) is on the south side of terminal 2, where passengers are able to go to Guangzhou downtown by taking metro, rail, bus or taxi.

As of 20 August 2026, the following airlines serve Terminal 2:

	Airlines	Check-in counter
Domestic	China Southern Airlines, XiamenAir, Sichuan Airlines, Chongqing Airlines, Hebei Airlines, Urumqi Air, West Air	C, D, E, F, G, J
International	Japan Airlines, Kenya Airways, Saudia, Garuda Indonesia	M
International	Korean Air, China Airlines, Vietnam Airlines, Singapore Airlines, Thai Airways International, Aeroflot, Sichuan Airlines	N
International	China Southern Airlines	P, Q

=== Terminal 3 ===
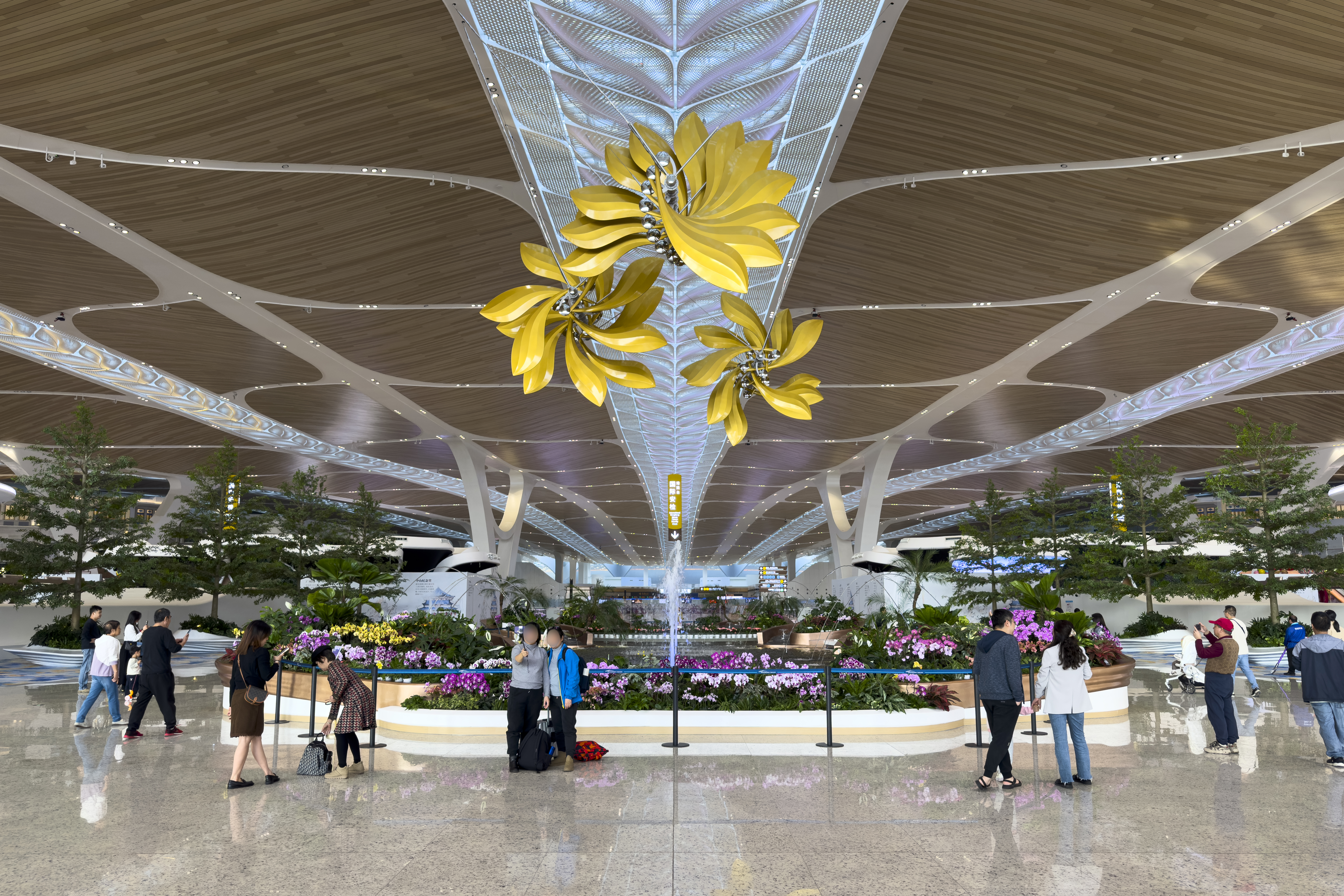
‘Seed in Flight’ sculpture and art installation at Terminal 3's Departures Hall

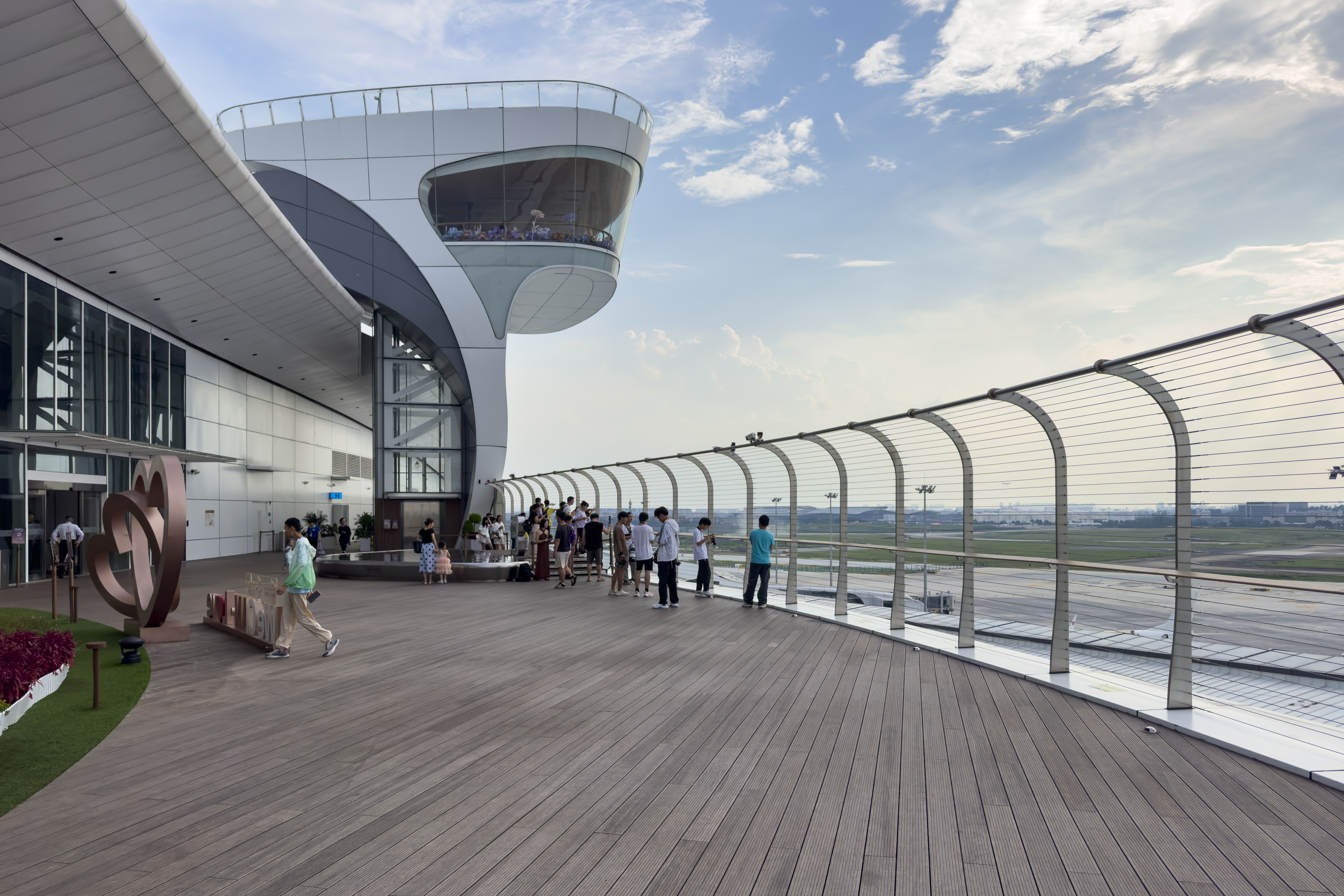
Observation deck at Terminal 3

Terminal 3 opened on 30 October 2025, with an area measuring over 422,000 square metres. The terminal built using BIM digital technology and designed to operate with paper-free archives for first time in China, with its "flower" design theme. The terminal has the first open-air airport observation deck in China.

As of 20 August 2026, the following airlines serve Terminal 3:

	Airlines	Check-in counter
Domestic	Air China, Shenzhen Airlines, Shandong Airlines, Hainan Airlines, Juneyao Airlines, Okay Airways, China United Airlines, Kunming Airlines, Beijing Capital Airlines, Tianjin Airlines, Tibet Airlines, Lucky Air, China Eastern Airlines, Shanghai Airlines, Spring Airlines	C, D, E, K
International	Lao Airlines, All Nippon Airways, Mahan Air, Scoot, US-Bangla Airlines, Centrum Air, Cambodia Airways, Vietjet Air, Emirates, Cathay Pacific, China Eastern Airlines, Shenzhen Airlines, Hainan Airlines, Spring Airlines, Iraqi Airways	G
International	Myanmar Airways International, Biman Bangladesh Airlines, EVA Air, Nepal Airlines, Turkish Airlines, SriLankan Airlines, Cebu Pacific, Cambodia Angkor Air, Thai Lion Air, Batik Air Malaysia, Ethiopian Airlines, Qanot Sharq	H
International	Air Algérie, EgyptAir, Thai AirAsia, AirAsia, S7 Airlines	K

=== FedEx Asia-Pacific hub ===
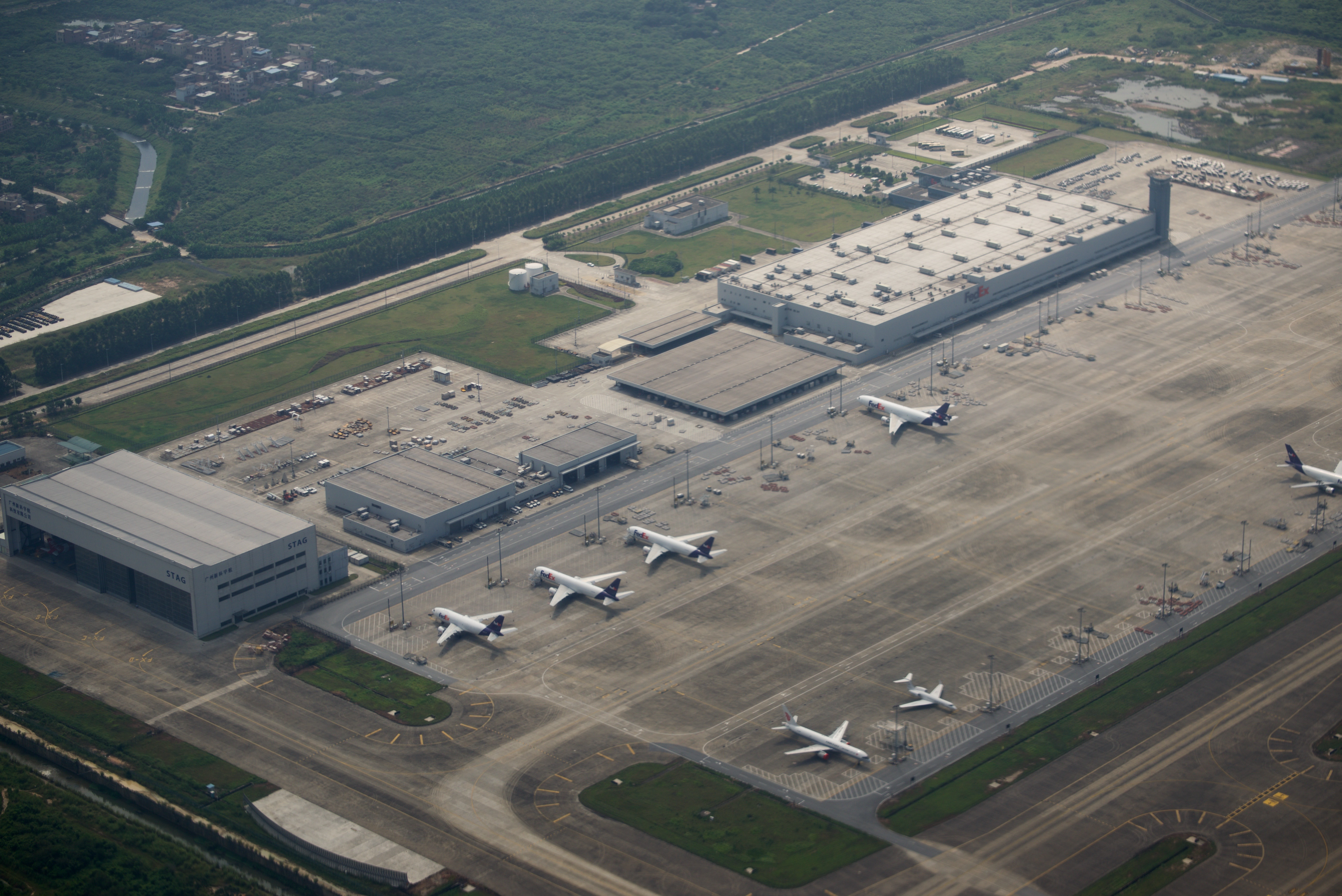
FedEx Asia-Pacific hub apron

On 13 July 2005, FedEx Express signed a contract with the airport authority to relocate its Asia-Pacific hub from Subic Bay International Airport in the Philippines to Baiyun Airport. The new Asia-Pacific hub covers an area of approximate 63 hectares (160 acres), with a total floor space of 82,000 square metres (880,000 sq ft). At the beginning of operation, the hub employed more than 800 people and operated 136 flights a week, providing delivery services among 20 major cities in Asia and linking these cities to more than 220 countries and territories in the world. The Guangzhou hub was, at the time of the opening, the largest FedEx hub outside the United States, but it was later surpassed by the expanded hub at Paris' Charles de Gaulle Airport.

The hub has its own ramp control tower, a first for an international air express cargo company facility in China, which enables FedEx to control aircraft movements on the ground, aircraft parking plans as well as loading and unloading priorities. Included at the hub are a unique package and sorting system with 16 high-speed sorting lines, seven round-out conveyor belts and 90 primary and secondary document-sorting splits. With the new advanced system, up to 24,000 packages can be sorted an hour at the start of operations.

Construction began in 2006 and the hub was originally scheduled to open on 26 December 2008. On 17 November 2008, after several months of testing, FedEx announced that the opening date was delayed to the first half of 2009 when the hub was expected to be fully operational. FedEx claimed that the revised operation date "provided FedEx with the necessary time to fully test all systems and processes, as well as work closely with the Guangzhou authorities to ensure all necessary approvals are in place".

On 17 December 2008, the hub completed its first flight operations test. A FedEx MD-11 aircraft took off from Subic Bay International Airport in the Philippines and landed at Baiyun Airport at 05:50 local time. The flight was handled by the new FedEx hub team, using the FedEx ramp control tower and the new 24,000 package per hour sort system. Following a successful operations' process, the flight departed on time for its final destination at Charles de Gaulle Airport in Paris, France. This Asia-Europe flight route operated four times per week during test run. FedEx also announced that the hub would start operation on 6 February 2009.

FedEx closed its 13-year-old Asia-Pacific hub at Subic Bay of northern Philippines on 6 February 2009, with the last flight leaving for Taiwan just before dawn, while hub operations have moved to Baiyun Airport. The first flight that arrived at the new FedEx Asia-Pacific hub originated from Indianapolis International Airport. The MD-11 aircraft landed at 23:07 local time at Baiyun International Airport from Charles de Gaulle Airport in Paris, marking the opening and full operations of the new Asia-Pacific hub.

=== Runways ===
Guangzhou Baiyun International Airport now has five runways.

The third runway opened on 5 February 2015, which temporarily tackled the long‐standing capacity obstacle. The operation of the third runway expanded Baiyun Airport's capacity, pushing business up. Unfortunately, the third runway can only be used for landing, as its airspace conflicts with Foshan Shadi Airport. The airport is planning to build two additional runways.

The fourth runway 01L/19R opened on 23 January 2025, makes Guangzhou Baiyun Airport the fourth airport to have a four-runway system in China after Shanghai–Pudong, Beijing–Daxing and Chongqing–Jiangbei. The current third runway 01/19 will be renamed 01R/19L.

The fifth runway 03/21 opened on 30 October 2025, makes Guangzhou Baiyun Airport the second airport to have a five-runway system in China.

The five-runway system will normally be operating as follows:

- Inner runways 01R/19L and 02L/20R for take off only.
- Outer runways 01L/19R and 02R/20L for landing only.

== Airlines and destinations ==
=== Passenger ===
Airlines	Destinations
9 Air	Bangkok–Suvarnabhumi, Beijing–Daxing, Chengdu–Tianfu, Chizhou, Chongqing, Haikou, Hangzhou, Harbin, Huangshan, Jakarta–Soekarno-Hatta, Jiaxing, Jiayuguan, Kuala Lumpur–International, Kunming, Lanzhou, Lianyungang, Linyi, Nanjing, Osaka–Kansai, Qingdao, Qionghai, Sanya, Shanghai–Pudong, Shangrao, Shuozhou, Singapore, Vientiane, Weifang, Wuxi, Xi'an, Xishuangbanna, Yinchuan, Zhengzhou
Aeroflot	Moscow–Sheremetyevo
Air Algérie	Algiers
Air Astana	Almaty, Astana
Air Busan	Busan (begins 2 December 2026)
Air Cambodia	Phnom Penh
Air Canada	Vancouver (begins 5 May 2027)
Air China	Beijing–Capital, Beijing–Daxing, Chengdu–Shuangliu, Chengdu–Tianfu, Chongqing, Dazhou, Hangzhou, Hohhot, Luzhou, Ningbo, Shanghai–Hongqiao, Shanghai–Pudong, Tianjin, Ürümqi, Wanzhou, Wenzhou, Yuncheng
Air Serbia	Belgrade (ends 27 November 2026)
Air Tanzania	Dar es Salaam, Zanzibar
AirAsia	Johor Bahru, Kota Kinabalu, Kuala Lumpur–International
All Nippon Airways	Tokyo–Haneda
Asiana Airlines	Seoul–Incheon (ends 17 December 2026)
Batik Air Malaysia	Kuala Lumpur–International, Kuching
Beijing Capital Airlines	Beijing–Daxing, Changchun, Chengdu–Tianfu, Chongqing, Hangzhou, Harbin, Lijiang, Shijiazhuang, Tianjin, Yinchuan
Biman Bangladesh Airlines	Dhaka
Cambodia Airways	Phnom Penh, Sihanoukville
Cathay Pacific	Hong Kong
Cebu Pacific	Manila
Centrum Air	Tashkent
Chengdu Airlines	Chengdu–Shuangliu
China Airlines	Taipei–Taoyuan
China Eastern Airlines	Bangkok–Suvarnabhumi, Beijing–Daxing, Changzhou, Chengdu–Shuangliu, Chengdu–Tianfu, Chongqing, Dali, Diqing, Hefei, Huai'an, Jinan, Kunming, Lanzhou, Lhasa, Lijiang, Mangshi, Nanchang, Nanjing, Ningbo, Qingdao, Shanghai–Hongqiao, Shenyang, Taiyuan, Taizhou, Wuhan, Wuxi, Xi'an
China Southern Airlines	Adelaide, Addis Ababa, Almaty, Altay, Amsterdam, Ankang, Anqing, Anyang, Auckland, Baishan (begins 1 December 2026), Bangkok–Suvarnabhumi, Bayannur, Bazhong, Beihai, Beijing–Daxing, Belgrade, Bishkek, Brisbane, Budapest, Changchun, Changde, Changsha, Changzhou, Chengdu–Shuangliu, Chengdu–Tianfu, Chiang Mai, Chongqing, Dali, Dalian, Dandong, Darwin, Dazhou, Delhi–Indira Gandhi, Denpasar, Diqing, Dhaka, Doha (resumes 1 January 2027), Dubai–International (resumes 1 January 2027), Frankfurt, Fuyang, Fuzhou, Guiyang, Haikou, Hangzhou, Hanoi, Harbin, Hefei, Heze, Ho Chi Minh City, Hohhot, Huai'an, Islamabad, Istanbul, Jakarta–Soekarno-Hatta, Jeju (resumes 19 December 2026), Jiaxing, Jieyang, Jinan, Jinchang, Jingzhou, Jining, Kashgar, Kathmandu, Korla, Kota Kinabalu, Kuala Lumpur–International, Kunming, Lahore, Langzhong, Lanzhou, Lhasa, Liancheng, Lianyungang, Lijiang, Linfen, Linyi, Lishui, London–Gatwick, London–Heathrow, Los Angeles, Luoyang, Luxembourg, Luzhou, Macau (begins 10 December 2026), Madrid, Manado, Mangshi, Manila, Meizhou, Melbourne, Mianyang, Moscow–Sheremetyevo, Nairobi–Jomo Kenyatta, Nanchang, Nanchong, Nanjing, Nanning, Nantong, Nanyang, New York–JFK, Nha Trang, Ningbo, Nyingchi, Osaka–Kansai, Panzhihua, Paris–Charles de Gaulle, Penang, Perth, Phnom Penh, Phuket, Port Moresby, Qingdao, Quanzhou, Quzhou, Riyadh (resumes 1 January 2027), Rizhao, Ruijin, San Francisco, Sanming, Sanya, Seoul–Incheon, Shanghai–Hongqiao, Shanghai–Pudong, Shennongjia, Shenyang, Shijiazhuang, Shiyan, Singapore, Surabaya, Sydney–Kingsford Smith, Taipei–Taoyuan, Taiyuan, Taizhou, Tashkent, Tengchong, Tianjin, Tokyo–Haneda, Tokyo–Narita, Toronto–Pearson, Ulanhot, Ulanqab, Ürümqi, Vancouver, Vientiane, Wanzhou, Wenshan, Wenzhou, Wuhan, Wuhu (resumes 29 March 2027), Wushan, Wuxi, Xi'an, Xiamen, Xiangyang, Xingtai, Xingyi, Xining, Xishuangbanna, Xuzhou, Yan'an, Yancheng, Yangon, Yangzhou, Yantai, Yinchuan, Yiwu, Yuncheng, Zhangjiajie, Zhangye, Zhanjiang, Zhaotong, Zhengzhou, Zhoushan, Zunyi–Maotai, Zunyi–Xinzhou; Seasonal: Christchurch, Langkawi (begins 22 January 2027); Charter: Palu
China United Airlines	Beijing–Daxing, Wenzhou
Chongqing Airlines	Chongqing, Dali, Lanzhou, Lijiang, Mangshi, Ningbo, Shijiazhuang, Xining, Xishuangbanna, Yinchuan
Egyptair	Cairo
Emirates	Dubai–International
Ethiopian Airlines	Addis Ababa
Etihad Airways	Abu Dhabi (resumes 24 March 2027)
EVA Air	Taipei–Taoyuan
Garuda Indonesia	Jakarta–Soekarno-Hatta; Charter: Manado, Palu
Gulf Air	Bahrain
Hainan Airlines	Beijing–Capital, Chengdu–Tianfu, Chongqing, Dunhuang, Haikou, Hangzhou, Harbin, Hefei, Hohhot, Hotan, Jinan, Kunming, Lanzhou, Nanjing, Ningbo, Qianjiang, Sanya, Shanghai–Hongqiao, Shanghai–Pudong, Taipei–Taoyuan, Taiyuan, Ürümqi, Wenzhou, Xi'an, Zhengzhou
Hebei Airlines	Shijiazhuang
IndiGo	Delhi–Indira Gandhi, Kolkata
Iraqi Airways	Baghdad
Japan Airlines	Tokyo–Haneda
Juneyao Airlines	Nanjing, Shanghai–Hongqiao, Shanghai–Pudong
Kenya Airways	Bangkok–Suvarnabhumi, Nairobi–Jomo Kenyatta
Korean Air	Seoul–Incheon
Kunming Airlines	Kunming
Kuwait Airways	Kuwait City
Lao Airlines	Pakse, Vientiane
Loong Air	Enshi, Hailar, Hangzhou, Hohhot, Xishuangbanna, Xuzhou, Zhengzhou
Lucky Air	Kunming
Mahan Air	Tehran–Imam Khomeini
Malaysia Airlines	Kuala Lumpur–International
Myanmar Airways International	Yangon
Nepal Airlines	Kathmandu
Okay Airways	Tianjin
Qatar Airways	Doha
Rossiya Airlines	Krasnoyarsk–International
S7 Airlines	Irkutsk, Novosibirsk (resumes 22 December 2026), Vladivostok
Saudia	Jeddah, Riyadh
Scoot	Singapore
Shandong Airlines	Jinan, Qingdao, Wuyishan, Yantai
Shanghai Airlines	Hangzhou, Shanghai–Hongqiao, Shanghai–Pudong
Shenzhen Airlines	Beijing–Capital, Changzhou, Chengdu–Shuangliu, Chengdu–Tianfu, Hai Phong, Haikou, Hailar, Hangzhou, Hanoi, Harbin, Hefei, Jinan, Lanzhou, Lijiang, Linyi, Nanjing, Nantong, Qingdao, Shanghai–Pudong, Shenyang, Taizhou, Wenzhou, Wuxi, Xi'an, Xining, Yangzhou, Yantai, Yinchuan, Zhengzhou
Sichuan Airlines	Chengdu–Shuangliu, Chengdu–Tianfu, Chongqing, Hangzhou, Kunming, Luzhou
Singapore Airlines	Singapore
Sky Angkor Airlines	Phnom Penh, Sihanoukville
Spring Airlines	Bangkok–Suvarnabhumi, Chiang Mai, Ho Chi Minh City, Jakarta–Soekarno-Hatta, Jeju, Kuala Lumpur–International, Lanzhou, Ningbo, Phnom Penh, Phuket, Shanghai–Hongqiao, Shijiazhuang, Singapore
SriLankan Airlines	Colombo–Bandaranaike
TAAG Angola Airlines	Luanda–Agostinho Neto
Thai AirAsia	Bangkok–Don Mueang
Thai Airways International	Bangkok–Suvarnabhumi
Thai Lion Air	Bangkok–Don Mueang
Thai VietJet Air	Bangkok–Suvarnabhumi
Tianjin Airlines	Tianjin
Tibet Airlines	Chengdu–Shuangliu
TransNusa	Denpasar, Jakarta–Soekarno-Hatta, Manado
Turkish Airlines	Istanbul
Urumqi Air	Ürümqi, Yutian
US-Bangla Airlines	Dhaka
Uzbekistan Airways	Tashkent
VietJet Air	Hanoi, Ho Chi Minh City
Vietnam Airlines	Hanoi, Ho Chi Minh City
West Air	Chongqing, Zhengzhou
XiamenAir	Beijing–Daxing, Fuzhou, Hangzhou, Quanzhou, Tianjin, Xiamen, Yinchuan

=== Cargo ===
Airlines	Destinations
AeroLogic	Anchorage, Cincinnati
Air Central	Seoul–Incheon, Zhengzhou
Air China Cargo	Glasgow–Prestwick, Madrid, Mexico City–Felipe Ángeles, Milan–Malpensa, Paris–Charles de Gaulle
ANA Cargo	Tokyo–Narita
Astral Aviation	Nairobi–Jomo Kenyatta
China Postal Airlines	Liège, Luxembourg
China Southern Cargo	Auckland, Frankfurt, Glasgow–Prestwick, Hanoi, Ho Chi Minh City, London–Stansted, Los Angeles, Madrid, Paris–Charles de Gaulle, Sydney–Kingsford Smith, Vienna
Emirates SkyCargo	Dubai–Al Maktoum
Ethiopian Airlines Cargo	Oslo
FedEx Express	Anchorage, Bangkok–Suvarnabhumi, Bengaluru, Cologne/Bonn, Jakarta–Soekarno-Hatta, Memphis, Paris–Charles de Gaulle, Penang, Sydney–Kingsford Smith
North-Western Cargo International Airlines	Dhaka, Xi'an
Qatar Airways Cargo	Doha
Saudia Cargo	Riyadh
SF Airlines	Delhi–Indira Gandhi, Taipei–Taoyuan
YTO Cargo Airlines	Mumbai–Shivaji

== Statistics ==
Traffic by calendar year
Year	Passengers	Aircraft movements	Cargo (tons)
2009	37,048,712	308,863	955,269.7
2010	40,975,673	329,214	1,144,455.7
2011	45,040,340	349,259	1,179,967.7
2012	48,309,410	373,314	1,248,763.8
2013	52,450,262	394,403	1,309,745.5
2014	54,780,346	412,210	1,454,043.8
2015	55,201,915	409,679	1,537,758.9
2016	59,732,147	435,231	1,652,214.9
2017	65,806,977	465,295	1,780,423.1
2018	69,720,403	477,364	1,890,560.0
2019	73,378,475	491,249	1,919,926.9
2020	43,768,000	-	-
2021	40,249,679	362,470	2,044,908.7
2022	26,104,989	266,627	1,884,082.0
2023	63,167,751	456,104	2,030,522.7
2024	76,369,000	-	2,380,000
2025	83,582,952	550,512	2,439,247.5

== Ground transportation ==
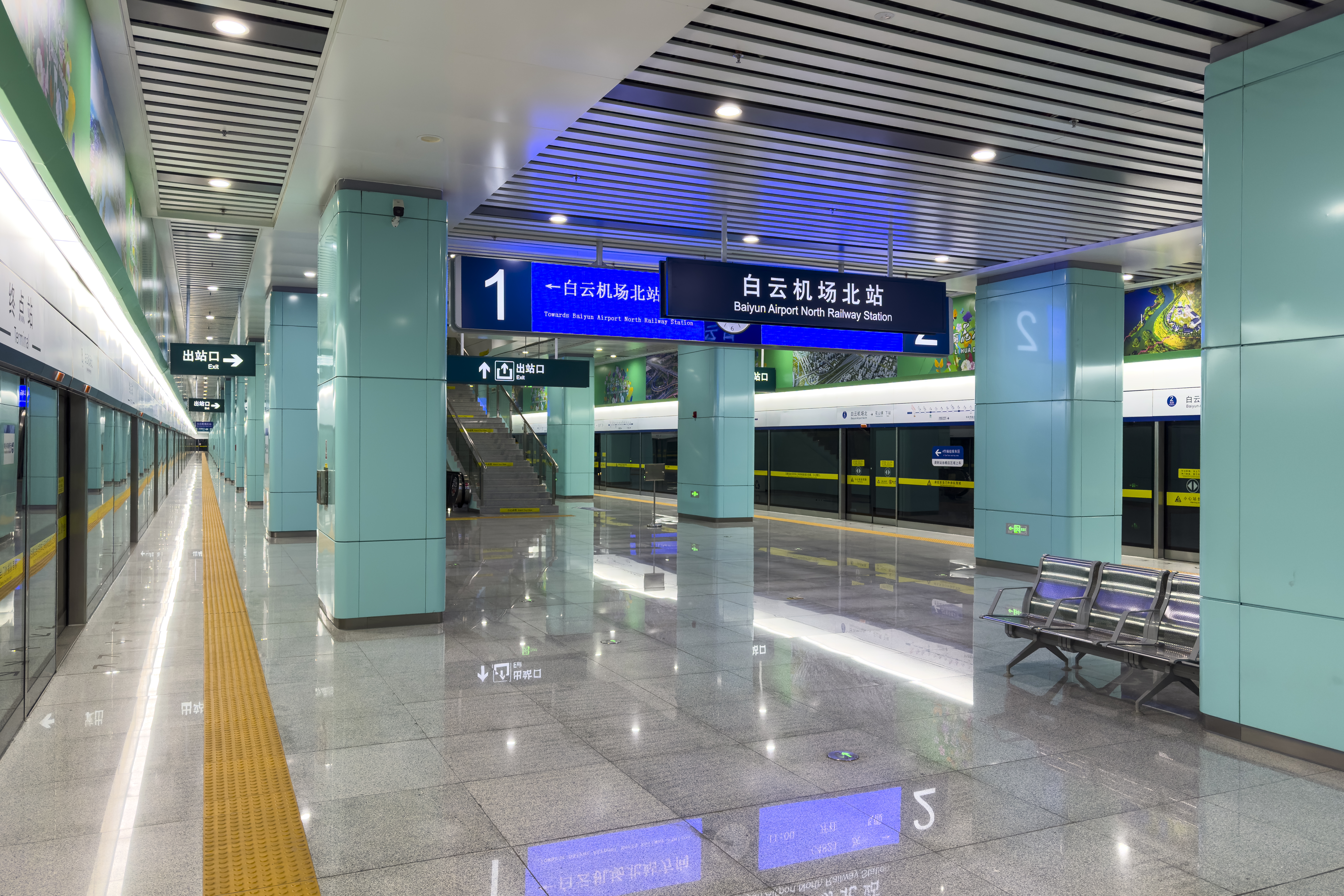
Baiyun Airport North railway station of intercity railway

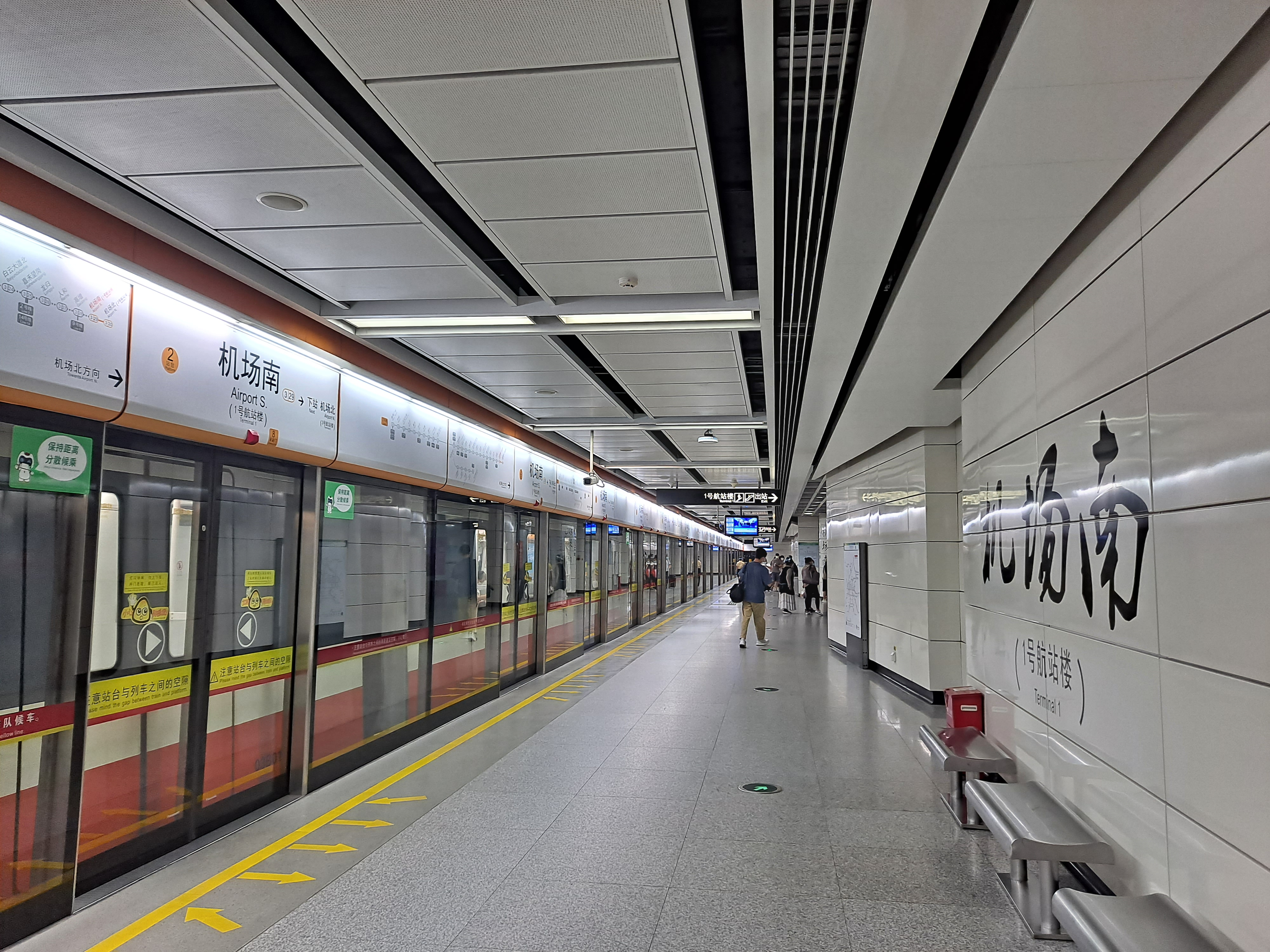
Airport South station on Line 3 of Guangzhou Metro

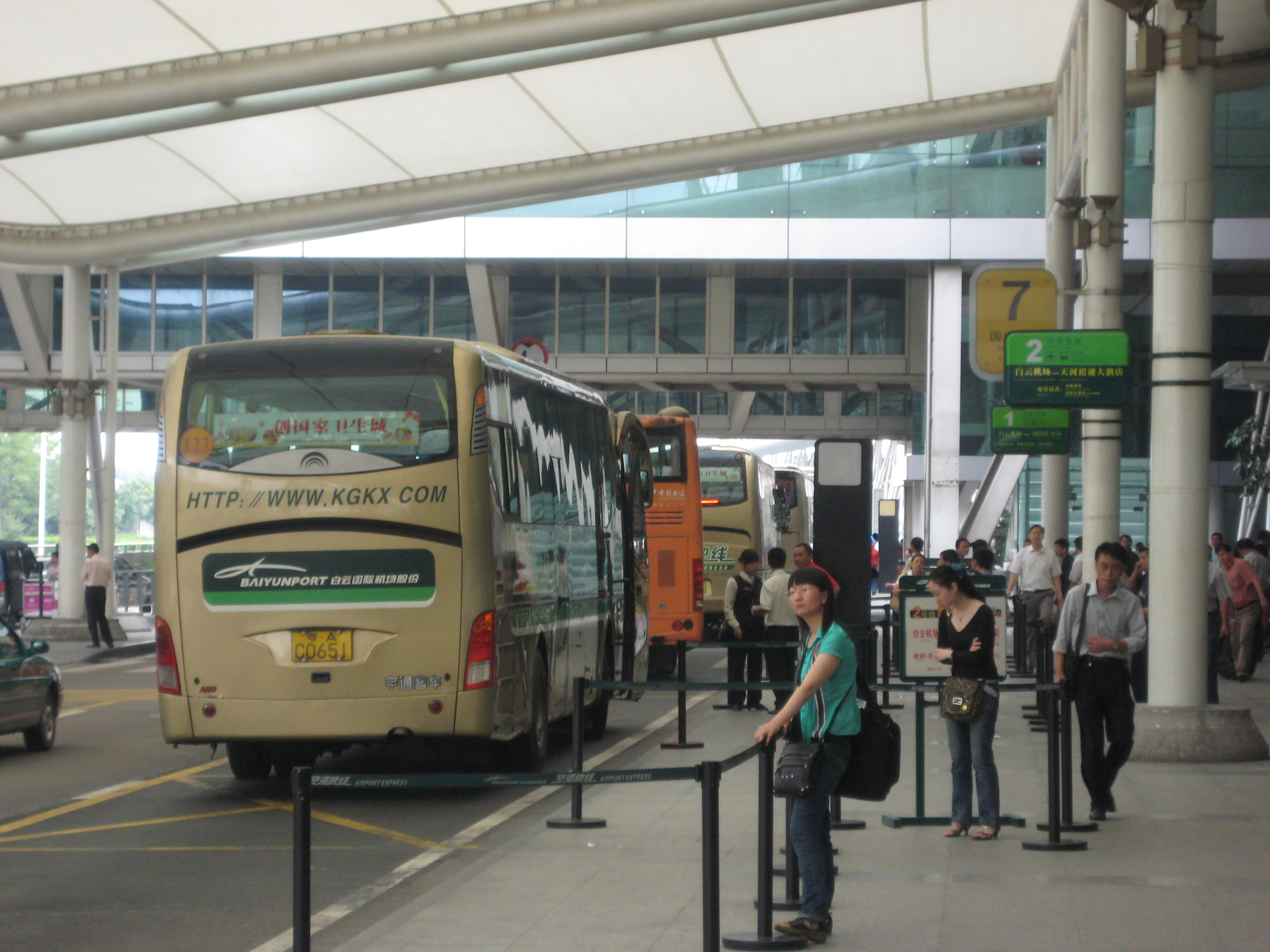
Airport Express Bus

=== Inter-terminal ===
There is a free shuttle bus that goes between Terminals 1, Terminal 2 and Terminal 3.

=== Road ===
The airport is connected to downtown Guangzhou by the S41 Guangzhou Airport Expressway.

=== Rail ===
Guangzhou–Foshan circular intercity railway serve Baiyun Airport North railway station (for Terminal 2), Baiyun Airport South railway station (for Terminal 1) and Baiyun Airport East railway station (for Terminal 3) in the airport. The intercity railway connects the airport to Panyu railway station and Huadu railway station.

Since 7 May 2026, Baiyun Airport South railway station is temporarily closed for the renovation of Terminal 1.

=== Metro ===
Guangzhou Baiyun International Airport is served by the Airport South Station (serving Terminal 1) and the Airport North Station (serving Terminal 2) on Line 3 of Guangzhou Metro.

Since 7 May 2026, Airport South Station of Guangzhou Metro is temporarily closed for the renovation of Terminal 1.

For now, there is no metro line serving Terminal 3 (until Guangzhou Metro Line 22 extends in the future). Passengers going to Terminal 3 can take inter-terminal free shuttle bus or intercity railway from Terminal 2, or take a bus from Gaozeng station on Line 3 of Guangzhou Metro.

In the future, Guangzhou Metro Line 22 will serve the airport (including Terminal 3), connecting it to downtown Guangzhou.

=== Bus ===
There are five Airport Express lines and six Airport Non-stop lines between airport and downtown. Buses take passengers to the city's major hotels, grand plaza and transportation centre, such as the Garden Hotel, Guangdong Hotel, CITIC Plaza, Haizhu Square, Tianhe Coach Station, and Guangzhou North Station.

To service passengers out of Guangzhou city, the airport also provides intercity bus service. The buses will take passengers from/to Dongguan, Foshan, Zhongshan, Huizhou, Jiangmen and other destinations.

== See also ==
- Guangzhou Baiyun International Airport (former)
- List of airports in Guangdong province, from 1911-current (Zh-Wiki)
- List of airports in China
- List of the busiest airports in China
- World's busiest airports by cargo traffic
- World's busiest airports by passenger traffic
