= Shanghai Airport Authority =

Chinese airport company

- Type: Government-owned corporation

Shanghai International Airport Co., Ltd.
- Type: Public
- Traded as: SSE: 600009

Shanghai Airport Authority (上海机场集团公司), branded as AVINEX, is a state-owned enterprise of the Shanghai Municipal Government and operates both Pudong (PVG) and Hongqiao (SHA) airports in Shanghai, China.

SAA was established in 1998 and aims to manage Shanghai airports to be the core airport hub in the Asia-Pacific region. SAA revealed its new brand identity "AVINEX" on 29 June 2021, its 100th anniversary.

The registered address is a location at Pudong Airport, while the office is in Changning District.

== Link ==
- Shanghai Airport Authority
