= Zunyi Xinzhou Airport =

Airport in Zunyi, Guizhou, China

Zunyi Xinzhou Airport 遵义新舟机场
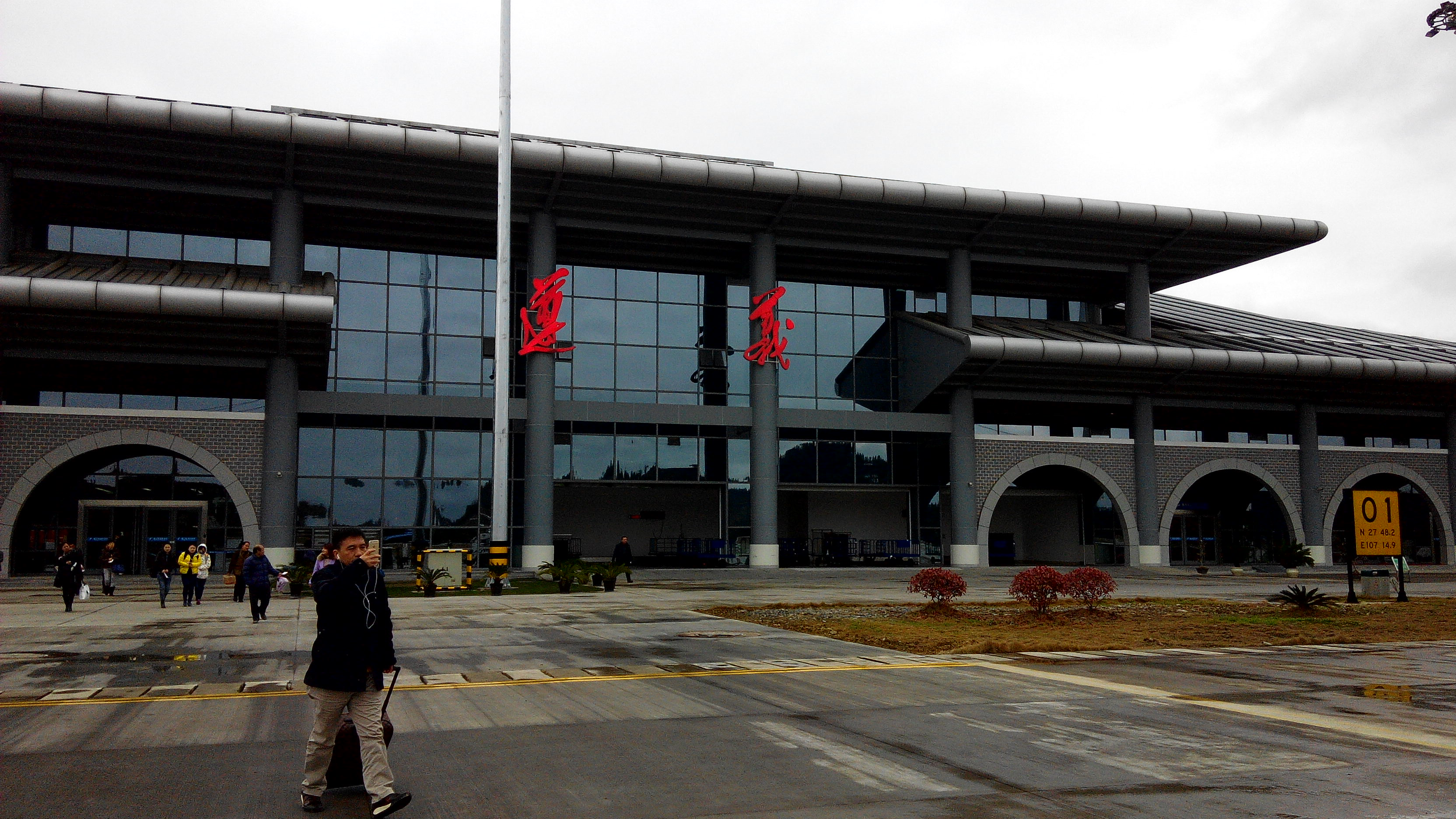
- IATA: ZYI; ICAO: ZUZY

Summary
- Airport type: Public / Military
- Serves: Zunyi, Guizhou, China
- Location: Xinzhou, Xinpu New Area
- Opened: 28 August 2012; 14 years ago
- Coordinates: 27°48′40.2″N 107°14′45.5″E
- Website: zunyiairport.cn

Map
- Location in Guizhou ZYI/ZUZY (China)

Runways
Direction	Length		Surface
Direction	m	ft	Surface
18/36	2,800	9,186	Concrete

Statistics (2025)
- Passengers: 1,388,520
- Aircraft movements: 11,840
- Cargo (metric tons): 1,118.0
- Source: CAAC

Zunyi Xinzhou Airport
- Simplified Chinese: 遵义新舟机场
- Traditional Chinese: 遵義新舟機場
Transcriptions
Standard Mandarin
- Hanyu Pinyin: Zūnyì Xīnzhōu Jīchǎng

Zunyi Xinzhou Airport (IATA: ZYI, ICAO: ZUZY) is a dual-use military and civil airport serving the city of Zunyi in China's southwestern Guizhou Province. It is located in the town of Xinzhou in Xinpu New Area. The military air base was built in 1966 and completed in 1970.

In September 2009 construction was started to convert the air base to a dual-use airport, with an estimated total investment of 408 million yuan. The airport opened on 28 August 2012, with inaugural flights to Beijing and Guangzhou.

== History ==
Zunyi Xinzhou Airport is an airport with a rich historical background. Its predecessor was the Zunyi Air Force Airport (also known as Xinzhou Airport). Zunyi established Laopuchang Airport in 1934 and Longping Airport in 1940. The latter was converted into the Zunyi Civil Aviation Station in 1970, but both airports have been abandoned. Xinzhou Airport started construction on December 17, 1969, and was officially completed and put into use in January 1980, initially as a secondary permanent air force base. At that time, the runway was 3,000 meters long, but civil aviation services had not yet been opened.

In January 2009, the Central Military Commission and the State Council approved the airport to be used for both military and civilian purposes. The airport expansion project was launched on May 4 of the same year. The design goal at that time was to achieve an annual passenger flow of 300,000 people by 2020. In July 2011, the design scheme of the Xinzhou Airport terminal building was determined to be based on the Zunyi Conference site.

Zunyi Xinzhou Airport made its first calibration flight on December 31, 2011 and its first test flight on June 2, 2012 by China Southern Airlines Boeing 737-800. On July 26, 2012, the expansion and renovation project of Zunyi Xinzhou Airport passed the acceptance of the Civil Aviation Administration of Southwest China and officially opened to traffic on August 28 of the same year. Subsequently, due to the rapid growth of passenger flow, Zunyi Airport, which only had 3 Class C parking stands, experienced a shortage of facilities just one year after its opening. Therefore, the Zunyi Municipal Government decided to expand the airport in 2013. In July 2018, the expansion project of part of the airport apron was completed, with 5 new Class C parking stands and one taxiway. The number of parking stands at Xinzhou Airport increased to 10 and the number of taxiways increased to 2. By the end of the same year, the airport's passenger throughput reached 2 million passengers.

On July 1, 2014, the Zunyi Airport Expressway was completed and opened to traffic. On December 30 of the same year, Zunyi Xinzhou Airport was approved by the National Port Management Office to temporarily open its port from January 1, 2015 to June 30, 2015. On June 28, 2015, Air China launched a temporary passenger charter flight from Zunyi to Hong Kong International Airport, making Zunyi the second city in Guizhou Province to open its aviation port. The temporary opening period of Zunyi Airport was subsequently extended to December 31, 2015. It was temporarily opened again from 2016 to 2018. The international passenger throughput in 2017 exceeded 25,000, and the international passenger throughput in 2018 exceeded 60,000.

Since its opening in 2012, Xinzhou Airport has seen rapid growth in passenger throughput (exceeding 2 million passengers in 2018), and the existing facilities could no longer meet the growing travel demand, making expansion of the airport an urgent necessity.

On December 28, 2018, the civil‑aviation portion of the Xinzhou Airport expansion and renovation project held its ground-breaking ceremony, with the pilot section of the civil‑aviation work area’s foundation treatment and earthwork project commencing first. The total investment is estimated at approximately 3 billion yuan. The expansion plan includes extending the existing runway 200 meters southward to a total length of 3,000 meters; constructing a new 3,000‑meter‑long, 18‑meter‑wide parallel taxiway; building 26 Class‑C aircraft stands, including four cargo stands; constructing a 60,000‑square‑meter terminal building, of which 11,000 square meters are designated for international operations; and adding a parking area of approximately 40,000 square meters. The project also includes a 3,600‑square‑meter cargo terminal equipped with inspection and quarantine facilities meeting port‑of‑entry requirements, as well as supporting infrastructure such as an aviation‑fuel depot, an air‑traffic‑management complex, a fire‑rescue station, an electrical and lighting substation, customs and border‑inspection facilities, and an airport hotel, totalling roughly 74,000 square meters of operational and service buildings. The expansion was planned for completion and commissioning in 2021, after which the new terminal area would be ten times larger than the existing one and capable of handling 4.5 million passengers annually (including 250,000 international passengers) and 12,500 tons of cargo, meeting the standards required for opening as an international aviation port.

Although the initial plan of Xinzhou Airport expansion and renovation project was to complete in 2021 or 2022, according to People Daily, the project had not yet started as of April 14, 2023. Meanwhile, the airport's passenger throughput fell from 2 million in 2018 to fewer than 1.4 million in 2025.

== Facilities ==
The airport has a 2,800-meter (9,200 ft) runway (class 4C) and an 11,000-square-meter (120,000 sq ft) terminal building that is designed to resemble the site of Zunyi Conference. It was projected to handle 300,000 passengers annually by 2020, although during its first year in operation the airport already handled 309,531.

== Airlines and destinations ==
Airlines	Destinations
Air Travel	Wuxi
China Eastern Airlines	Nanjing, Shanghai–Pudong, Wuhan
China Southern Airlines	Beijing–Daxing, Guangzhou
China United Airlines	Wenzhou
Colorful Guizhou Airlines	Xingyi, Zhuhai
Donghai Airlines	Ningbo, Shenzhen
Hebei Airlines	Beijing–Daxing
Jiangxi Air	Ganzhou–Ruijin, Nanchang
Loong Air	Hangzhou, Lijiang
Lucky Air	Dali, Hefei
Spring Airlines	Shanghai–Pudong
Tianjin Airlines	Haikou, Sanya, Xiamen, Xi'an, Zhengzhou

== See also ==
- List of airports in China
- List of the busiest airports in China
- List of People's Liberation Army Air Force airbases
