= Shanghai Pudong International Airport =

Main airport serving Shanghai, China

Shanghai Pudong International Airport 上海浦东国际机场

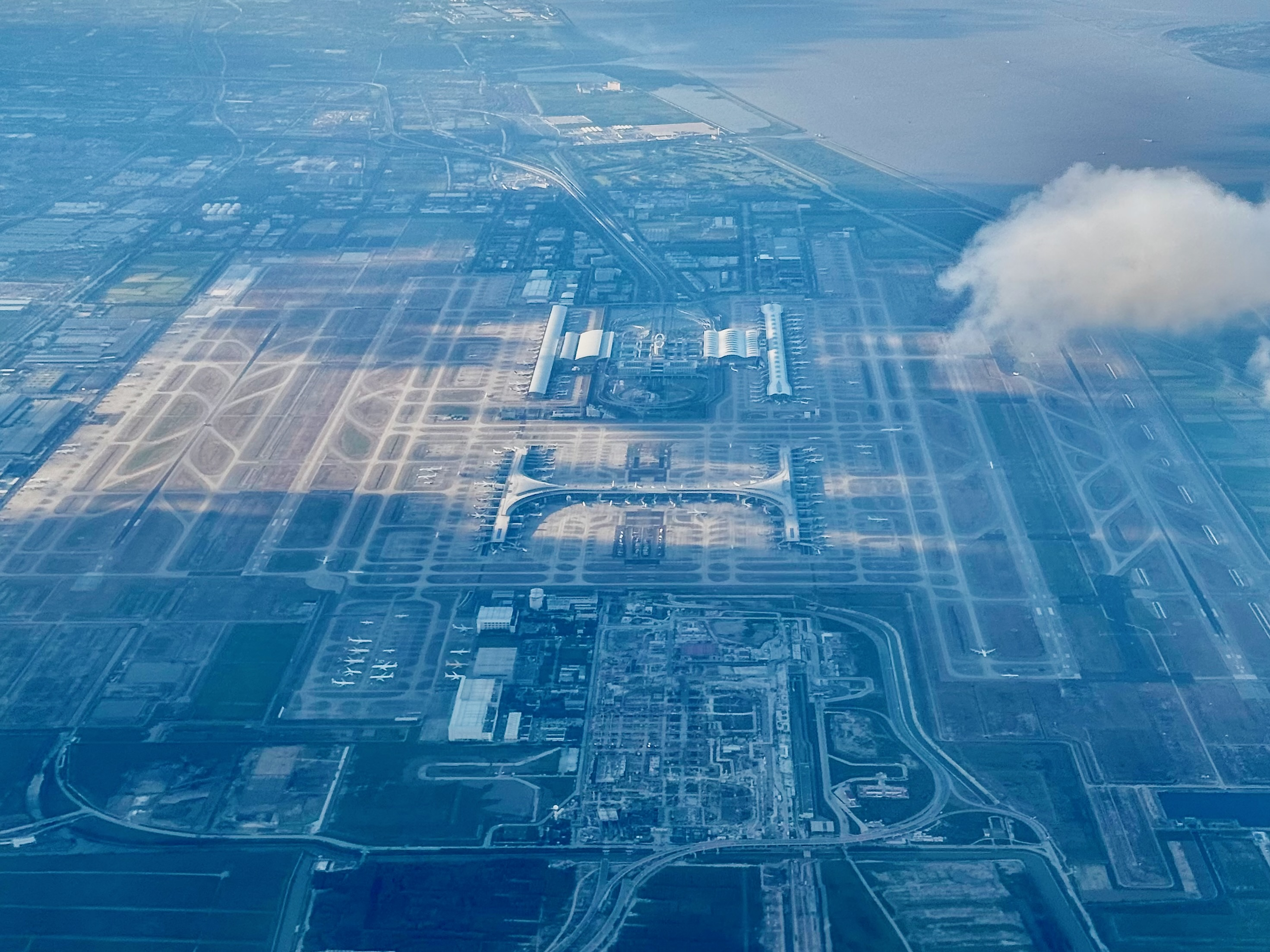
- Aerial view of the two terminals and satellite concourse with the 4-runway system (2024)
- IATA: PVG; ICAO: ZSPD

Summary
- Airport type: Public
- Owner/Operator: Shanghai Airport Authority
- Serves: Shanghai
- Location: Pudong, Shanghai, China
- Opened: 16 September 1999; 27 years ago
- Hub for: Air China; China Cargo Airlines; China Eastern Airlines; China Southern Airlines; DHL Aviation; FedEx Express; Juneyao Air; Shanghai Airlines; Suparna Airlines; UPS Airlines
- Focus city for: Hainan Airlines
- Operating base for: Spring Airlines
- Elevation AMSL: 4 m (13 ft)
- Coordinates: 31°08′36″N 121°48′19″E
- Website: www.shairport.com/enpd

Maps
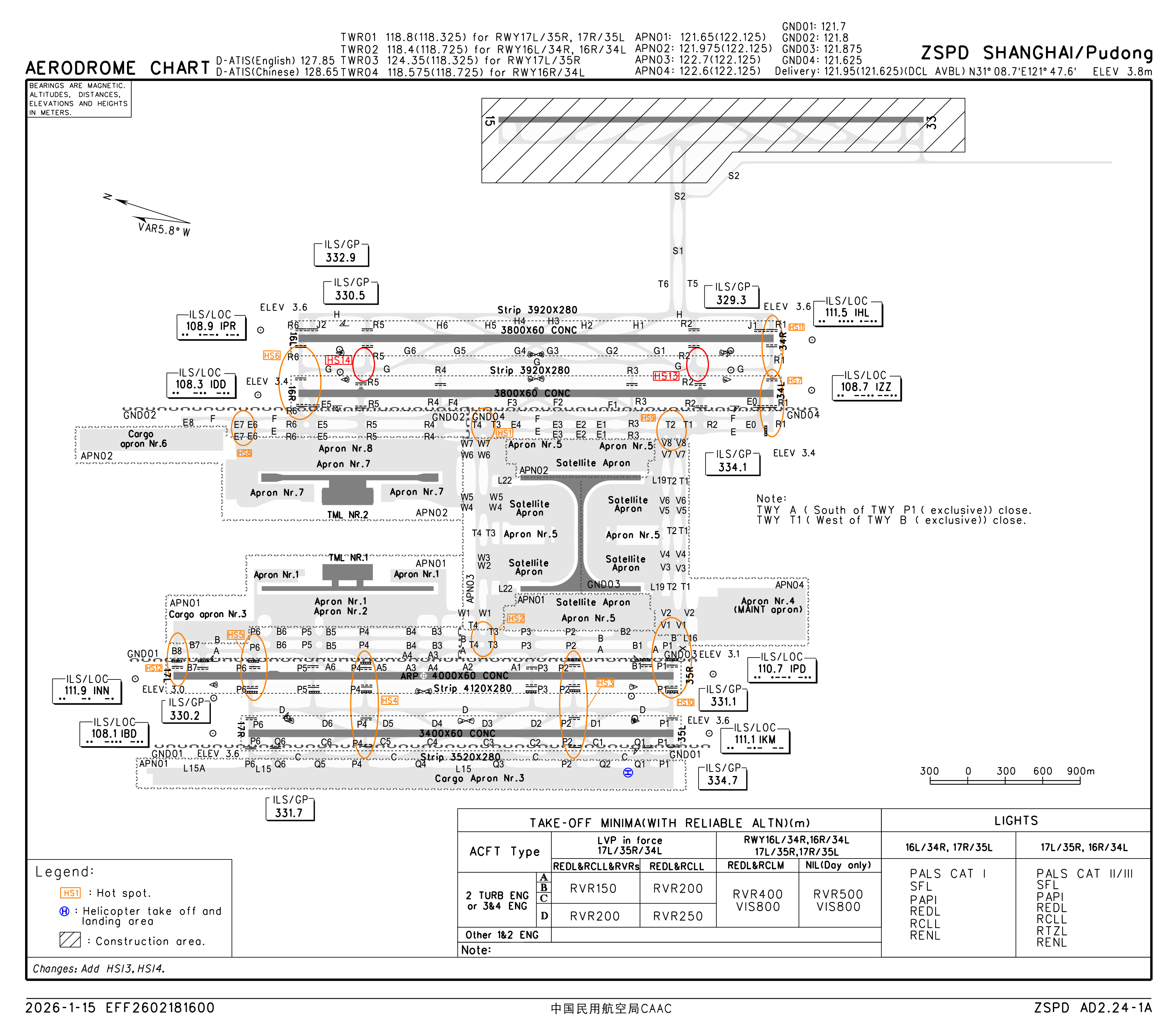
- CAAC airport chart

- Location in Shanghai Location in China

Runways
Direction	Length		Surface
Direction	m	ft	Surface
17L/35R	4,000	13,123	Concrete
16R/34L	3,800	12,467	Concrete
17R/35L	3,400	11,155	Concrete
16L/34R	3,800	12,467	Concrete
15/33 (Note: The runway is used exclusively for test flights for the Comac C919 and is not regularly used for commercial, civil aviation operations.)	3,400	11,155	Concrete

Statistics (2025)
- Passengers: 84,994,548 ▲10.7%
- Rank (world): 5th
- Aircraft movements: 557,043 ▲5.5%
- Cargo (Tonnes): 4,091,940.9 ▲8.3%
- Source: List of the busiest airports in the People's Republic of China

Shanghai Pudong International Airport
- Simplified Chinese: 上海浦东国际机场
- Traditional Chinese: 上海浦東國際機場
Transcriptions
Standard Mandarin
- Hanyu Pinyin: Shànghǎi Pǔdōng Guójì Jīchǎng
- Bopomofo: ㄕㄤˋ ㄏㄞˇ ㄆㄨˇ ㄉㄨㄥ ㄍㄨㄛˊ ㄐㄧˋ ㄐㄧ ㄔㄤˇ
- Wade–Giles: Shang^{4}-hai^{3} Pʻu^{3}-tung^{1} Kuo^{2}-chi^{4} Chi^{1}-chʻang^{3}
- Tongyong Pinyin: Shànghǎi Pǔ-dong Guó-jì Ji-chǎng
- IPA: [ʂâŋ.xàɪ pʰù.tʊ́ŋ kwǒ.tɕî tɕí.ʈʂʰàŋ]

Shanghai Pudong International Airport (IATA: PVG, ICAO: ZSPD) is the main international airport serving Shanghai, China.

Pudong Airport serves both international flights and a smaller number of domestic flights, while the city's other major airport, Shanghai–Hongqiao, mainly serves domestic and regional flights in East Asia. Located about 30 km (19 mi) east of the city center, Pudong Airport occupies a 40-square-kilometre (10,000-acre) site adjacent to the coastline in eastern Pudong. The airport is operated by Shanghai Airport Authority.

The airport is the main hub for China Eastern Airlines and Shanghai Airlines, and a major international hub for Air China, as well as a secondary hub for China Southern Airlines. It is also the hub for privately owned Juneyao Air and Spring Airlines, and an Asia-Pacific cargo hub for FedEx, UPS and DHL. The DHL hub, opened in July 2012, is reportedly the largest express hub in Asia.

Pudong Airport has two main passenger terminals, flanked on both sides by four operational parallel runways. Construction of a third passenger terminal was started in 2021, in addition to a satellite terminal and two additional runways, which will raise its annual capacity from 60 million passengers to 80 million, along with the ability to handle six million tons of freight.

Pudong Airport is a fast-growing hub for both passenger and cargo traffic. With 3,778,331 metric tons handled in 2024, the airport is the world's second-busiest airport by cargo traffic. Pudong Airport also served a total of 84,994,548 passengers in 2025, making it the busiest airport in China, third-busiest in Asia, and the fifth-busiest in the world. It is also the busiest international gateway of mainland China, with 35.25 million international passengers.

In the first quarter of 2026, Pudong Airport served with 21.739 million passengers (8.1046 million passengers are international), surpassing Baiyun Airport served total 22.539 million passengers (4.784 million passengers are international). In the first half of year 2026, the total passengers throughput of Pudong Airport reached 42.691 million passengers. In June 2026, the total passengers throughput of Pudong Airport reached 6.864 million passengers.

Shanghai Pudong is the busiest international hub in China, and about half of its total passenger traffic is international. Pudong Airport is connected to Shanghai Hongqiao Airport by Shanghai Metro Line 2, the Shanghai maglev train via Pudong Airport Terminal 1&2 station and the Airport Link Line (Shanghai Suburban Railway). There are also airport buses connecting it with the rest of the city.

== History ==
=== Early development ===
Construction of the first phase of the new Shanghai Pudong International Airport began in October 1997, took two years to build at a cost of RMB 12 billion (US$1.67 billion), and was officially opened on 16 September 1999 and it replaced Shanghai Hongqiao International Airport as Shanghai's primary airport which was the city's only commercial airport until the completion of Pudong International Airport. Most international flights were gradually moved to Pudong after its opening.

A second runway was opened on 17 March 2005, and construction of phase two (including a second terminal, a third runway and a cargo terminal) began in December 2005 and started operation on 26 March 2008, in time for the Beijing 2008 Summer Olympics.

In November 2011, Pudong Airport received approval from the national government for a new round of expansion which includes two runways. The 3,800-metre (12,467 ft) fourth runway, along with an auxiliary taxiway and traffic control facilities, is projected to cost 2.58 billion yuan (US$403 million). The 3,400-metre (11,155 ft) fifth runway, along with a new traffic tower, will cost 4.65 billion yuan (US$726.6 million). Construction was completed in 2015 and has doubled the capacity of the airport.

=== Ongoing expansion ===
Pudong International Airport officially started the third phase of the Pudong International Airport expansion with the construction on a new south satellite terminal on 29 December 2015. The new satellite terminal will be the world's largest single satellite terminal with a total construction area of 622,000 square metres (6,700,000 sq ft), which is larger than the Pudong International Airport T2 terminal building (485,500 square metres [5,226,000 sq ft]). The satellite terminal is composed of two halls, S1 and S2, forming an H-shaped structure. It will have an annual design capacity of 38 million passengers, The total cost of the project is estimated to be about 20.6 billion yuan. Halls S1 and S2 will have 83 gates. A high capacity people mover connecting T1 to S1 and T2 to S2 will be constructed. After the completion of the satellite terminal in 2019, Pudong International Airport will have an annual passenger capacity of 80 million passengers, ranking among the top ten airports in the world by capacity.

As of October 2019, the satellite terminal is in operation and connected by people movers to the main Terminals 1 and 2.

By 6 January 2021, work on Pudong Airport T3 began on the south side of the airfield. The new terminal is anticipated to serve 50 million annual passengers when it opens according to city officials, while the entire airport is expected to have 130 million passengers by 2030. Several public transport lines will be extended to T3.

== Facilities ==
Terminal 1 was opened to public and officially opened on 1 October 1999 along with a 4,000-metre (13,000 ft) runway and a cargo hub.

Terminal 2 was officially opened to the public on 26 March 2008 along with the third runway, making the entire airport capable of handling 60 million passengers and 4.2 million tons of cargo annually. Terminal 2 is shaped like Terminal 1, although it more closely resembles a wave, and is slightly larger than Terminal 1. Terminal 2 also has more floor areas than Terminal 1. Terminal 2 is primarily used by Air China and other Star Alliance members.

Construction on an additional satellite concourse facility to accommodate further gates and terminal space started on 29 December 2015 and officially opened in September 2019. It is the largest stand-alone satellite airport terminal buildings in the world at 622,000 square metres (6,700,000 sq ft).

The satellite terminals (S1 and S2) are connected to the main terminals (T1 and T2) by the Shanghai Pudong Airport automatic people mover, an underground automated metro system. The West line connects terminals T1 and S1, and the East line connects terminals T2 and S2.

The airport has been using the Airport Collaborative Decision Making system (A-CDM) developed by the aviation data service company VariFlight since January 2017. The system is aimed to improve on-time performance and safety of the airport's operations. By June 2017, Shanghai Pudong airport recorded 62.7% punctuality rate, which was a 15% increase compared to the same period previous year.

On 2 November 2026, check in counter service for domestic flights at Hongqiao Airport began to operate. The counter is located at the domestic side of Terminal 2.

Exterior of Terminal 1

Departure area of Terminal 1

Check-in counters of Terminal 2

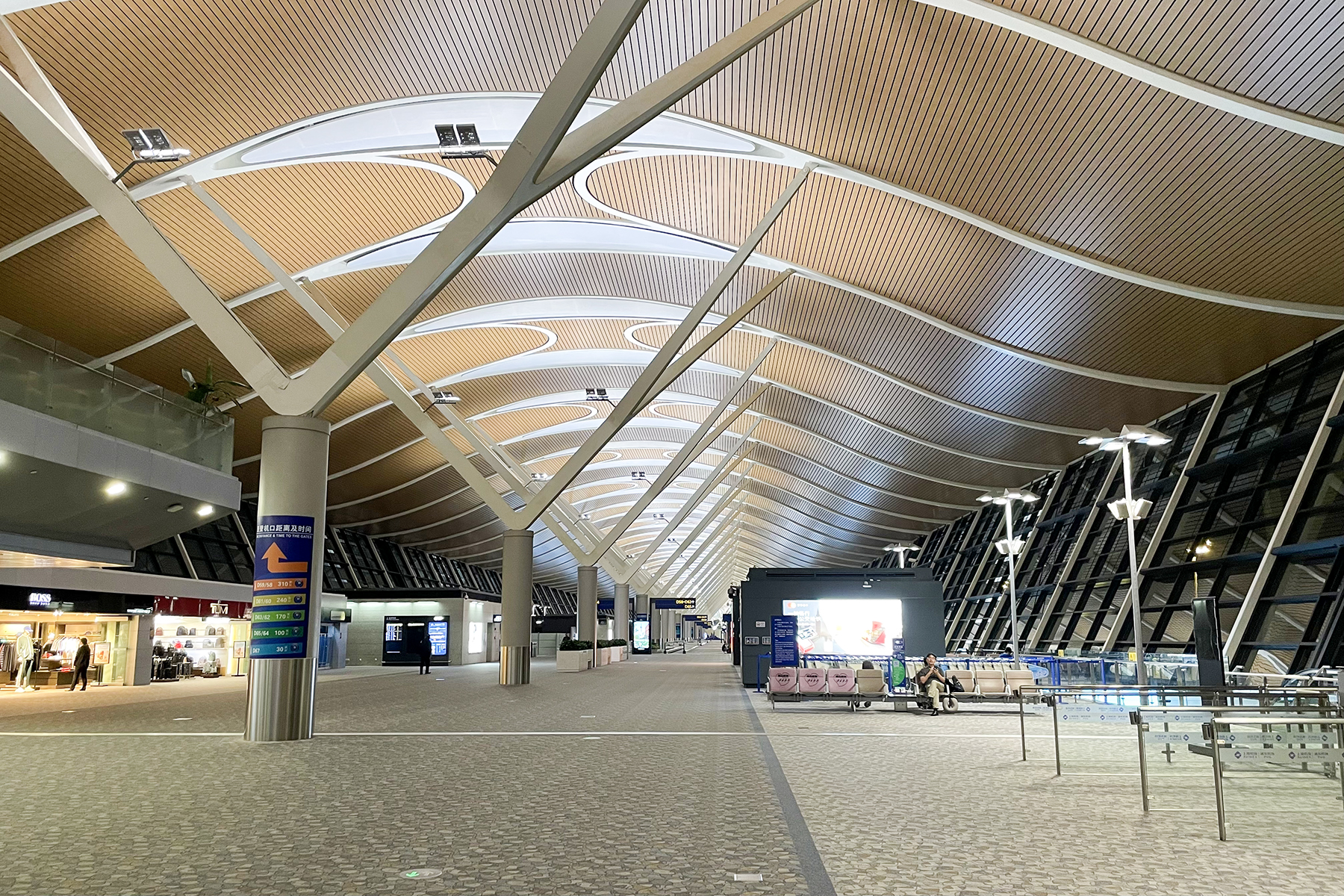
Interior of Terminal 2

Concourse C of Terminal 2

== Airlines and destinations ==
=== Passenger ===
Airlines	Destinations
9 Air	Guangzhou
Aeroflot	Moscow–Sheremetyevo
Air Algérie	Algiers
Air Astana	Almaty
Air Canada	Toronto–Pearson, Vancouver
Air China	Bangkok–Suvarnabhumi, Barcelona, Beijing–Capital, Beijing–Daxing, Changchun, Chengdu–Shuangliu, Chengdu–Tianfu, Chongqing, Daqing, Frankfurt, Fukuoka, Guangzhou, Haikou, Hanoi, Hohhot, Huizhou, Jiamusi, Kunming, London–Gatwick, Milan–Malpensa, Munich, Sendai, Shenyang, Shenzhen, Singapore, Taipei–Taoyuan, Tianjin, Tokyo–Narita, Ürümqi, Wenzhou, Xi'an, Xilinhot, Xining, Zhanjiang
Air France	Paris–Charles de Gaulle
Air India	Delhi–Indira Gandhi
Air Macau	Macau
Air New Zealand	Auckland
Air Serbia	Belgrade
AirAsia	Kota Kinabalu; Charter: Tawau
AirAsia X	Kuala Lumpur–International
All Nippon Airways	Osaka–Kansai, Tokyo–Haneda, Tokyo–Narita
American Airlines	Dallas/Fort Worth
Asiana Airlines	Seoul–Incheon (ends 17 December 2026)
Aurora	Khabarovsk, Yuzhno-Sakhalinsk
Austrian Airlines	Vienna
Batik Air Malaysia	Kuala Lumpur–International
Beijing Capital Airlines	Lijiang, Xishuangbanna
British Airways	London–Heathrow
Cathay Pacific	Hong Kong
Cebu Pacific	Cebu (resumes 2 December 2026), Manila
Chengdu Airlines	Chengdu–Shuangliu, Chengdu–Tianfu, Yueyang
China Airlines	Kaohsiung, Taipei–Taoyuan
China Eastern Airlines	Abu Dhabi, Almaty, Amsterdam, Auckland, Baise, Bangkok–Suvarnabhumi, Barcelona, Beihai, Beijing–Capital, Beijing–Daxing, Brisbane, Buenos Aires–Ezeiza, Busan, Cairo, Cebu, Changbaishan, Chengdu–Shuangliu, Chengdu–Tianfu, Chiang Mai, Chongqing, Colombo–Bandaranaike, Copenhagen, Daegu, Dali, Dalian, Daqing, Dazhou, Delhi–Indira Gandhi, Denpasar, Dubai–International, Dublin, Dunhuang, Frankfurt, Fukuoka, Fuyang, Fuzhou, Ganzhou, Geneva, Guangzhou, Guilin, Guiyang, Haikou, Hanoi, Hangzhou, Harbin, Hefei, Hiroshima, Ho Chi Minh City, Hohhot, Hong Kong, Huizhou, Istanbul, Jakarta–Soekarno-Hatta, Jeju, Jiamusi, Jiayuguan, Jieyang, Jinan, Jinggangshan, Jingzhou, Karamay, Kazan, Korla, Kuala Lumpur–International, Kunming, Lanzhou, Lijiang, Lincang, Lishui, Liuzhou, London–Gatwick, London–Heathrow, Los Angeles, Macau, Madrid, Malé, Mangshi, Manila, Meizhou, Melbourne, Milan–Malpensa, Moscow–Sheremetyevo, Nagoya–Centrair, Naha, Nanchang, Nanchong, Nanjing, Nanning, New York–JFK, Ordos, Osaka–Kansai, Paris–Charles de Gaulle, Penang, Phnom Penh, Phuket, Qingdao, Qionghai, Qiqihar, Quanzhou, Riyadh, Rome–Fiumicino, Ruijin, Saint Petersburg, San Francisco, Sanya, Sapporo–Chitose, Seoul–Incheon, Shenyang, Shenzhen, Shijiazhuang, Singapore, Stockholm–Arlanda, Sydney–Kingsford Smith, Taipei–Taoyuan, Tashkent, Tbilisi, Tianjin, Tokyo–Haneda, Tokyo–Narita, Toronto–Pearson, Ürümqi, Vancouver, Venice, Vientiane, Wenzhou, Wuhan, Xi'an, Xiamen, Xingyi, Xining, Xinyang, Xishuangbanna, Yan'an, Yantai, Yinchuan, Yiwu, Zhanjiang, Zhengzhou, Zhuhai, Zunyi–Maotai, Zunyi–Xinzhou, Zurich; Seasonal: Adelaide
China Southern Airlines	Beijing–Daxing, Changchun, Changsha, Chengdu–Tianfu, Chongqing, Dandong, Guangzhou, Haikou, Ho Chi Minh City, Jieyang, Kunming, Nanning, Nanyang, Qingdao, Sanya, Shenyang, Seoul–Incheon, Tokyo–Narita, Ürümqi, Wuhan, Zhengzhou, Zhuhai
China United Airlines	Baicheng, Beijing–Daxing, Foshan, Hailar, Huizhou
Chongqing Airlines	Chongqing
Delta Air Lines	Detroit, Los Angeles, Seattle/Tacoma
Donghai Airlines	Shenzhen
Eastar Jet	Jeju, Seoul–Incheon
Egyptair	Cairo
Emirates	Dubai–International
Ethiopian Airlines	Addis Ababa
Etihad Airways	Abu Dhabi
EVA Air	Kaohsiung, Taipei–Taoyuan
Finnair	Helsinki
Garuda Indonesia	Jakarta–Soekarno-Hatta
Gulf Air	Bahrain
Hainan Airlines	Beijing–Capital, Brussels, Changsha, Chengdu–Tianfu, Chongqing, Guangzhou, Haikou, Sanya, Shenzhen, Xi'an
Hebei Airlines	Shijiazhuang
Himalaya Airlines	Kathmandu
Hong Kong Airlines	Hong Kong
IndiGo	Kolkata
Japan Airlines	Osaka–Kansai, Sapporo–Chitose, Tokyo–Haneda, Tokyo–Narita
Jeju Air	Busan
Jetstar Japan	Tokyo–Narita
Jin Air	Jeju
Juneyao Air	Athens, Bangkok–Suvarnabhumi, Beijing–Daxing, Bijie, Brussels, Changchun, Changsha, Chengdu–Tianfu, Chifeng, Chongqing, Denpasar, Fuzhou, Guangzhou, Guilin, Haikou, Hanoi, Helsinki Ho Chi Minh City, Hong Kong, Hohhot, Huizhou, Jakarta–Soekarno-Hatta, Jeju, Jieyang, Jinchang, Kaohsiung, Kuala Lumpur–International, Lanzhou, Lijiang, Longnan, Manchester, Manila, Melbourne, Nagoya–Centrair, Osaka–Kansai, Penang, Qingdao, Qingyang, Sanya, Sapporo–Chitose, Shaoguan, Shenyang, Shenzhen, Shuozhou, Singapore, Sydney–Kingsford Smith, Taipei–Taoyuan, Tawau, Tokyo–Haneda, Tokyo–Narita, Tongren, Ulanhot, Ürümqi, Wenzhou, Wuhan, Xiamen, Xishuangbanna, Yichang, Yingkou, Yulin (Guangxi), Yulin (Shaanxi), Zhengzhou, Zhuhai
KLM	Amsterdam
Korean Air	Busan, Seoul–Incheon
Kunming Airlines	Kunming
Lao Airlines	Vientiane
Loong Air	Aksu, Chengdu–Tianfu, Yinchuan
Lucky Air	Xishuangbanna
Lufthansa	Frankfurt, Munich
Mahan Air	Tehran–Imam Khomeini
Malaysia Airlines	Kuala Lumpur–International
Peach	Osaka–Kansai, Tokyo–Haneda
Philippine Airlines	Manila
Qatar Airways	Doha
Qingdao Airlines	Qingdao
Rossiya Airlines	Krasnoyarsk–International, Vladivostok
S7 Airlines	Irkutsk, Novosibirsk, Vladivostok
SCAT Airlines	Şymkent
Shandong Airlines	Qingdao
Shanghai Airlines	Bangkok–Suvarnabhumi, Baotou, Budapest, Busan, Casablanca, Changchun, Changsha, Chengdu–Tianfu, Chongqing, Guangzhou, Guilin, Haikou, Hengyang, Hong Kong, Jieyang, Kota Kinabalu, Kuala Lumpur–International, Lanzhou, Marseille, Mianyang, Mudanjiang, Nagoya–Centrair, Nanning, Ningbo, Osaka–Kansai, Penang, Phuket, Sanya, Shenyang, Shiyan, Singapore, Tianjin, Tokyo–Haneda, Ürümqi, Wanzhou, Weihai, Wenzhou, Wuzhou, Xiamen, Xining, Yantai, Zhanjiang, Zhengzhou
Shenzhen Airlines	Guangzhou, Shenzhen
Sichuan Airlines	Chengdu–Shuangliu, Chengdu–Tianfu, Chongqing, Ürümqi, Xi'an
Singapore Airlines	Singapore
Spring Airlines	Bangkok–Suvarnabhumi, Busan, Changchun, Cheongju, Chiang Mai, Chongqing, Dongying, Enshi, Fukuoka, Guilin, Heze, Ho Chi Minh City, Jeju, Jieyang, Kaohsiung, Kuala Lumpur–International, Lanzhou, Lijiang, Macau, Mianyang, Mohe, Naha, Osaka–Kansai, Penang, Phnom Penh, Sanya, Sapporo–Chitose, Seoul–Incheon, Shache, Shenyang, Shihezi, Singapore, Songyuan, Tokyo–Haneda, Tokyo–Narita, Ulaanbaatar, Xishuangbanna, Zhangye, Zunyi–Xinzhou; Seasonal: Kota Kinabalu
Spring Japan	Tokyo–Narita
Sun PhuQuoc Airways	Hanoi (begins 27 November 2026), Ho Chi Minh City
Suparna Airlines	Anyang, Chongqing, Guilin, Guiyang, Haikou, Hami, Harbin, Langzhong, Liuzhou, Luoyang, Nanning, Qingdao, Sanya, Shenyang, Shenzhen, Xingtai, Zhuhai
Swiss International Air Lines	Zurich
Thai Airways International	Bangkok–Suvarnabhumi
Thai Lion Air	Bangkok–Don Mueang
Thai VietJet Air	Bangkok–Suvarnabhumi
Tianjin Airlines	Dalian, Tianjin, Weihai
Tibet Airlines	Chengdu–Shuangliu
TransNusa	Charter: Manado
Turkish Airlines	Istanbul
United Airlines	Los Angeles, San Francisco
Urumqi Air	Ürümqi, Yutian
VietJet Air	Hanoi, Ho Chi Minh City
Vietnam Airlines	Hanoi, Ho Chi Minh City
West Air	Chongqing
XiamenAir	Beijing–Daxing, Shenyang, Tianjin, Yinchuan

== Statistics ==
Annual traffic statistics at Shanghai Pudong International Airport
Year	Passengers	% change	Aircraft movements	Cargo (tons)
2006	26,788,586		231,994	
2007	28,920,432	▲8.0%	253,532	2,559,098
2008	28,235,691	▼2.4%	265,735	2,603,027
2009	31,921,009	▲13.1%	287,916	2,543,394
2010	40,578,621	▲27.1%	332,126	3,228,081
2011	41,447,730	▲2.1%	344,086	3,085,268
2012	44,880,164	▲8.3%	361,720	2,938,157
2013	47,189,849	▲5.1%	371,190	2,928,527
2014	51,687,894	▲9.5%	402,105	3,181,654
2015	60,098,073	▲16.3%	449,171	3,275,231
2016	66,002,414	▲9.8%	479,902	3,440,280
2017	70,001,237	▲6.1%	496,774	3,835,600
2018	74,006,331	▲5.7%	504,794	3,768,573
2019	76,153,455	▲2.9%	581,848	3,624,230
2020	30,476,531	▼59.9%	325,678	3,686,627
2021	32,206,814	▲5.6%	349,524	3,982,616
2022	14,178,385	▼56.0%	204,378	3,117,215.6
2023	54,496,397	▲285.2%	433,867	3,440,084.3
2024	76,787,039	▲41.0%	528,074	3,778,331.0
2025	84,994,548	▲10.7%	557,043	4,091,940.9

== Ground transportation ==
Airport Link Line Platform of Pudong Airport Terminal 1 & 2 station

=== Rail transit ===
==== Metro ====
Line 2 of the Shanghai Metro was extended directly to the airport on 8 April 2010. The station was renamed Pudong Airport Terminal 1 & 2 on 21 September 2024, in advance of the opening of the suburban rail station with the same name.

==== Suburban rail ====
The Airport Link Line of Shanghai Suburban Railway commenced operation on 27 December 2024.

==== High-speed rail ====
The airport will be directly linked to Shanghai East railway station when it opens in 2027.

== Accidents and incidents ==
- On 28 November 2009, Avient Aviation Flight 324, a McDonnell Douglas MD-11F operating a scheduled international cargo to Bishkek, Kyrgyzstan, overran the runway on takeoff and crashed into a ravine, killing three of the seven occupants.
- On 22 July, 2020, Ethiopian Airlines Cargo Flight 3739, a Boeing 777-F60 operating a scheduled international cargo flight departing for Santiago, Chile with three stopovers, caught fire on the ground shortly before takeoff. All five crew members on board evacuated safely, but the aircraft was destroyed. The fire was caused by the spontaneous ignition of chlorine dioxide pills in the cargo hold.

== See also ==
- Shanghai Hongqiao International Airport
- List of airports in China
- List of airports with triple takeoff/landing capability
- List of the busiest airports in China
