= Huai'an Lianshui International Airport =

Airport serving Huai'an, Jiangsu, China

Huai'an Lianshui International Airport 淮安涟水国际机场
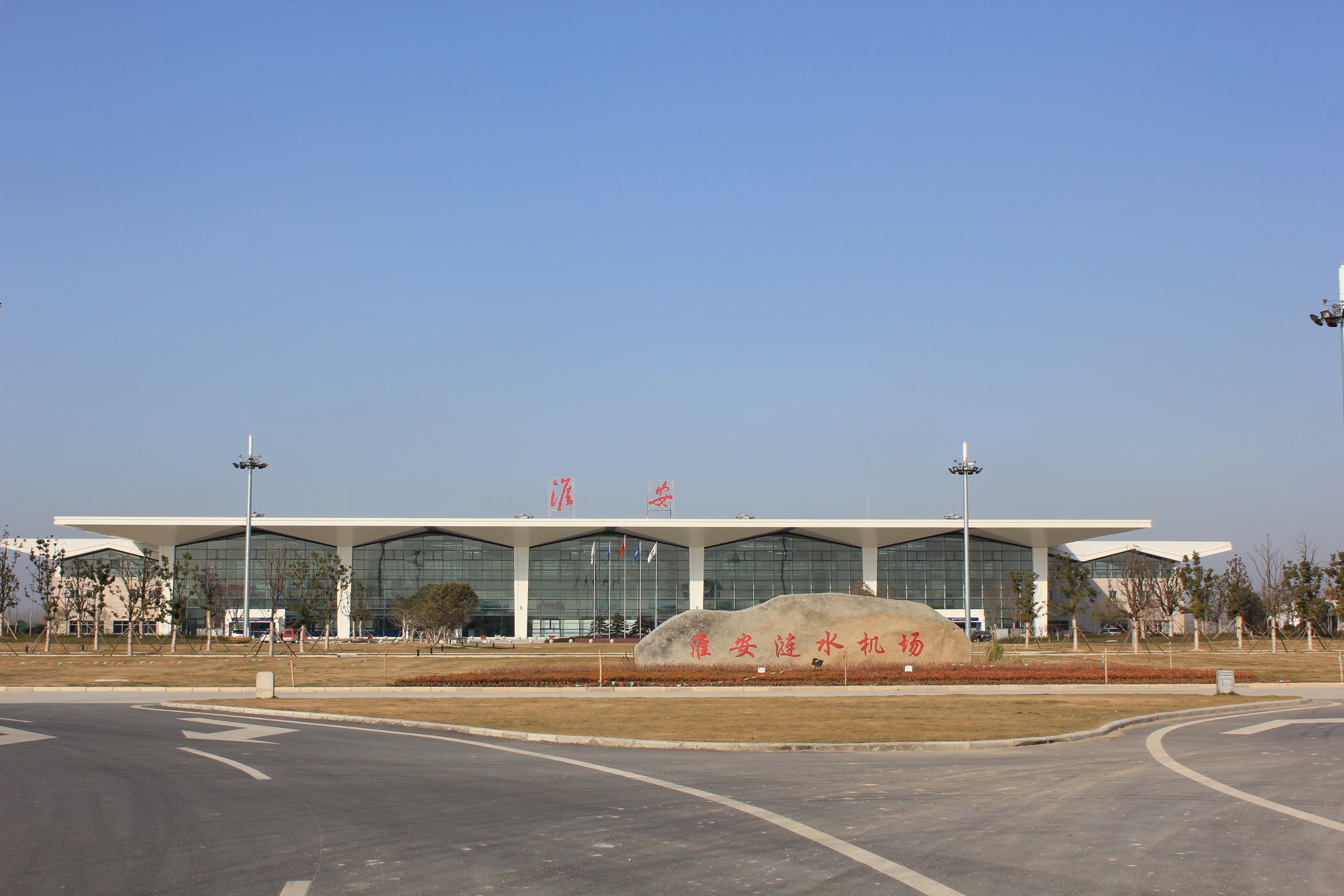
- IATA: HIA; ICAO: ZSSH

Summary
- Airport type: Public
- Owner/Operator: Eastern Airport Group Co., Ltd.
- Serves: Huai'an
- Location: Chenshi Town, Lianshui County, Huai'an, Jiangsu, China
- Opened: 26 September 2010; 16 years ago
- Elevation AMSL: 7 m (23 ft)
- Coordinates: 33°47′26″N 119°07′30″E
- Website: www.ha-airport.com

Map
- Location in Jiangsu HIA/ZSSH (China)

Runways
Direction	Length		Surface
Direction	m	ft	Surface
04/22	2,800	9,186	Concrete

Statistics (2025)
- Passengers: 2,007,564
- Aircraft movements: 41,056
- Cargo (metric tons): 9,628.1
- Source: CAAC

Huai'an Lianshui International Airport
- Simplified Chinese: 淮安涟水国际机场
- Traditional Chinese: 淮安漣水國際機場
Transcriptions
Standard Mandarin
- Hanyu Pinyin: Huái'ān Liánshuǐ Guójì Jīchǎng

Huai'an Lianshui International Airport (IATA: HIA, ICAO: ZSSH) is an airport serving the city of Huai'an in East China's Jiangsu province. It is located in the town of Chenshi in Lianshui County, 22 km (14 mi) northeast of the city center. Construction of the airport started in October 2008 with a total investment of 800 million yuan, and commercial flights began in September 2010.

In 2011, its first full year of operation, Huaian Airport handled 230,000 passengers to become the 99th busiest airport in China.

== History ==
The history of Huai'an Lianshui International Airport can be traced back to the era of Huaiyin Airport and Huaiyin Bochi Airport. In 1932, in preparation for the anti-Japanese war, the Nationalist Government built military airports at some strategic locations across the country. This is how the construction of the first airport in Huaiyin began. The address of this airport was chosen in the northwest suburbs outside the county. The engineering runway is 650 meters long from northwest to southeast and 15 meters wide. The airport has two wooden observation towers, one in the center of the airport and one in the southeast corner outside the airport. In 1939, Huaiyin was occupied by the Japanese army, and Huaiyin Airport became a wasteland.

In September 1946, after the Kuomintang troops captured Huaiyin, they ordered emergency repairs to Huaiyin Airport and extended the runway to 1,100 meters and 100 meters wide. At the end of 1948, the Kuomintang government was defeated by the Communist Party, and the land at Huaiyin Airport was assigned to the Institute of Agricultural Sciences for cultivation as a mixed grain experimental ground. In 1956, following the instructions of the Jiangsu Provincial Military Region, the Qingjiang Municipal Government decided to scrap Huaiyin Airport and build a new military airport at a new site due to reasons such as being too close to the urban area and occupying a small area. The construction of Huaiyin Bochi Airport started on March 3, 1958. It was named after the surrounding place name Bochi Township. It was opened to navigation on October 10, 1959 and was scrapped on September 13, 1990. Soon after, the airport was decommissioned, and on September 13, 1990, Huaiyin Bochi Airport received joint approval from the State Council and the Central Military Commission to be officially scrapped.

The site selection for Huai'an Lianshui International Airport started in 2005, and the project was approved by the State Council and the Central Military Commission in 2008. It was officially opened to air traffic in September 2010, thus ending the decades-long history of Huaiyin Airport without aircraft. On November 21, 2016, the second phase expansion project of Huai'an Lianshui Airport started construction. On April 26, 2018, the second phase expansion flight area project of Huai'an Airport was completed and officially put into operation. The altitude of the airport is 7 meters, the flight area level is 4D, the runway is 2800 meters long and 45 meters wide, which can meet the take-off and landing requirements of A321 and B737-800 aircraft. The terminal building covers an area of 14,700 square meters, with domestic and international halls accounting for half each, and three boarding bridges; the apron is 33,000 square meters with a total of 15 parking spaces; it has an annual throughput capacity of 1.3 million passengers. In 2022, the third phase of the reconstruction and expansion project will start construction to enhance the capacity of Huai'an air cargo hub.

== Facilities ==
The airport has one runway that is 2,800 meters long, and a 14,600-square-meter terminal building. It is designed to handle 1,300,000 passengers and 13,000 tons of cargo annually. The airport is also used as a pilot training base for China Eastern Airlines.

== Airlines and destinations ==
Huaian Lianshui International Airport is served by the following airlines:

Airlines	Destinations
China Eastern Airlines	Guangzhou, Hohhot, Jieyang, Kunming, Lanzhou, Nanchang, Shenyang, Shijiazhuang, Wenzhou, Wuhan, Xi'an
China Express Airlines	Taiyuan, Zhoushan
China Southern Airlines	Guangzhou, Shenzhen
Colorful Guizhou Airlines	Chengdu–Tianfu, Guiyang, Tianjin
Fuzhou Airlines	Changchun, Fuzhou
GX Airlines	Haikou, Nanning
Jiangxi Air	Nanchang, Quanzhou
Lucky Air	Changchun, Chongqing, Kunming, Lijiang
Shanghai Airlines	Changchun, Guilin
Spring Airlines	Harbin, Shenzhen
Urumqi Air	Lanzhou, Urumqi
XiamenAir	Changsha, Dalian, Shenyang, Xiamen

== See also ==
- List of airports in China
- List of the busiest airports in China
