= Jiangxi Air =

Chinese low-cost airline

Jiangxi Air 江西航空

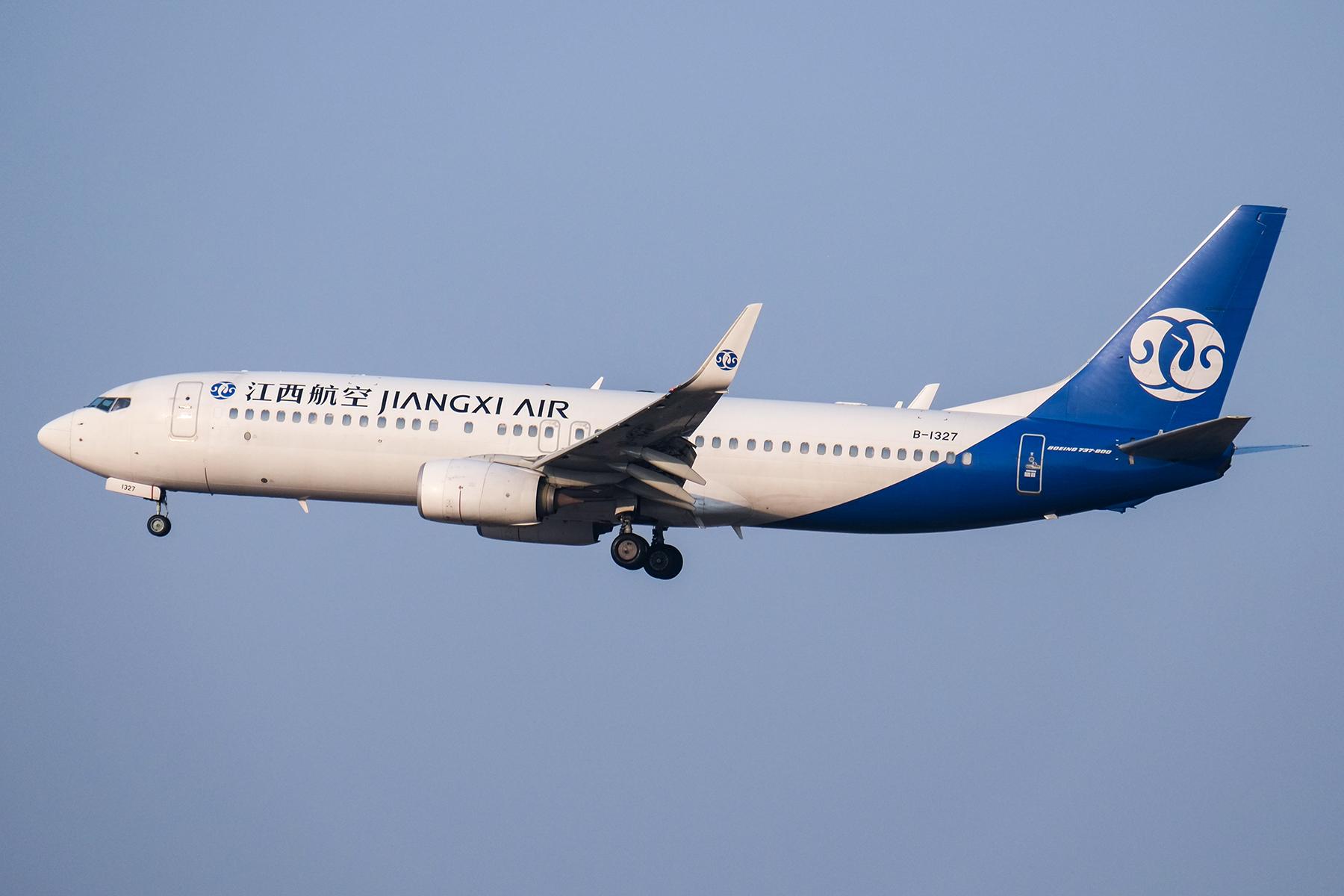
- Jiangxi Air Boeing 737-800
IATA	ICAO	Call sign
RY	CJX	AIR CRANE
- Founded: 2014; 12 years ago
- Commenced operations: 29 January 2016; 10 years ago
- Hubs: Nanchang Changbei International Airport
- Frequent-flyer program: Ganpo Club (discontinued); Egret Miles (from 29 March 2020 onwards, integrated with XiamenAir Frequent Flyer Program)
- Fleet size: 18
- Destinations: 36 (As of May 2026)
- Parent company: XiamenAir (60%)
- Key people: Hao Wu, chairman Wu Xiangyang, general manager
- Website: www.airjiangxi.com/jiangxiair/v2/index.action%20airjiangxi.com

Jiangxi Air
- Simplified Chinese: 江西航空
Transcriptions
Standard Mandarin
- Hanyu Pinyin: Jiāngxī Hángkōng

Jiangxi Air Co., Ltd. is a Chinese low-cost carrier with its headquarters at Nanchang Changbei International Airport, Jiangxi. It is a joint venture between XiamenAir and the Jiangxi Provincial Government.

== History ==
On 13 August 2014, XiamenAir and the Jiangxi Provincial Government signed a memorandum of understanding regarding the establishment of an airline based in the province.

On 17 March 2015, the Civil Aviation Administration of China (CAAC) granted Jiangxi Air preliminary approval to begin operations. The airline was granted its air operator's certificate on 8 December.

On 14 December 2015, Jiangxi Air received its first Boeing 737-800 aircraft, from parent XiamenAir, while unveiling its logo. Its livery consists of a crane, symbolising the environmental beauty of Jiangxi Province; and the colours blue and white, representing the famous porcelain of Jingdezhen in the province.

On 30 December 2015, the airline conducted its first test flight, from Nanchang to Xiamen. It received its air operator's certificate on 8 January 2016, allowing it to commence commercial flights.

Jiangxi Air operated its first flight on 29 January 2016, from Nanchang to Ürümqi via Xi'an. It is initially using pilots, flight attendants, maintenance staff, and other staff from XiamenAir.

== Corporate affairs ==
Jiangxi Air is a joint venture between XiamenAir (60%) and state-owned Jiangxi Aviation Investment Co Ltd (40%). The two organisations have invested ¥2 billion in the airline.

== Destinations ==
As of May 2026, Jiangxi Air serves 35 domestic destinations and 1 international destination:

Country	City	Airport	Notes	Ref(s)
China	Beihai	Beihai Fucheng Airport		
China	Beijing	Beijing Daxing International Airport		
China	Chengdu	Chengdu Tianfu International Airport		
China	Chongqing	Chongqing Jiangbei International Airport		
China	Guiyang	Guiyang Longdongbao International Airport		
China	Haikou	Haikou Meilan International Airport		
China	Hangzhou	Hangzhou Xiaoshan International Airport		
China	Harbin	Harbin Taiping International Airport		
China	Hohhot	Hohhot Baita International Airport		
China	Huai'an	Huai'an Lianshui International Airport		
China	Jiayuguan & Jiuquan	Jiayuguan Jiuquan Airport		
China	Jinan	Jinan Yaoqiang International Airport		
China	Kunming	Kunming Changshui International Airport		
China	Liuzhou	Liuzhou Bailian Airport		
China	Luoyang	Luoyang Beijiao Airport		
China	Luzhou	Luzhou Yunlong Airport		
China	Nanchang	Nanchang Changbei International Airport	Hub	
China	Nanjing	Nanjing Lukou International Airport		
China	Nanyang	Nanyang Jiangying Airport		
China	Ordos	Ordos Ejin Horo International Airport		
China	Shenyang	Shenyang Taoxian International Airport		
China	Qingdao	Qingdao Jiaodong International Airport		
China	Qionghai	Qionghai Bo'ao International Airport		
China	Quanzhou	Quanzhou Jinjiang International Airport		
China	Rizhao	Rizhao Shanzihe Airport		
China	Ruijin	Ganzhou Ruijin Airport		
China	Shenyang	Shenyang Taoxian International Airport		
China	Shenzhen	Shenzhen Bao'an International Airport		
China	Taiyuan	Taiyuan Wusu International Airport		
China	Tianjin	Tianjin Binhai International Airport		
China	Ürümqi	Ürümqi Diwopu International Airport		
China	Xi'an	Xi'an Xianyang International Airport		
China	Xiamen	Xiamen Gaoqi International Airport		
China	Xuzhou	Xuzhou Guanyin International Airport		
China	Yancheng	Yancheng Nanyang International Airport		
China	Zhengzhou	Zhengzhou Xinzheng International Airport		
China	Zunyi	Zunyi Xinzhou Airport		
Malaysia	Kuala Lumpur	Kuala Lumpur International Airport		

=== Codeshare Agreements ===
Jiangxi Air has codeshare agreements with the following airline:

- XiamenAir

== Fleet ==
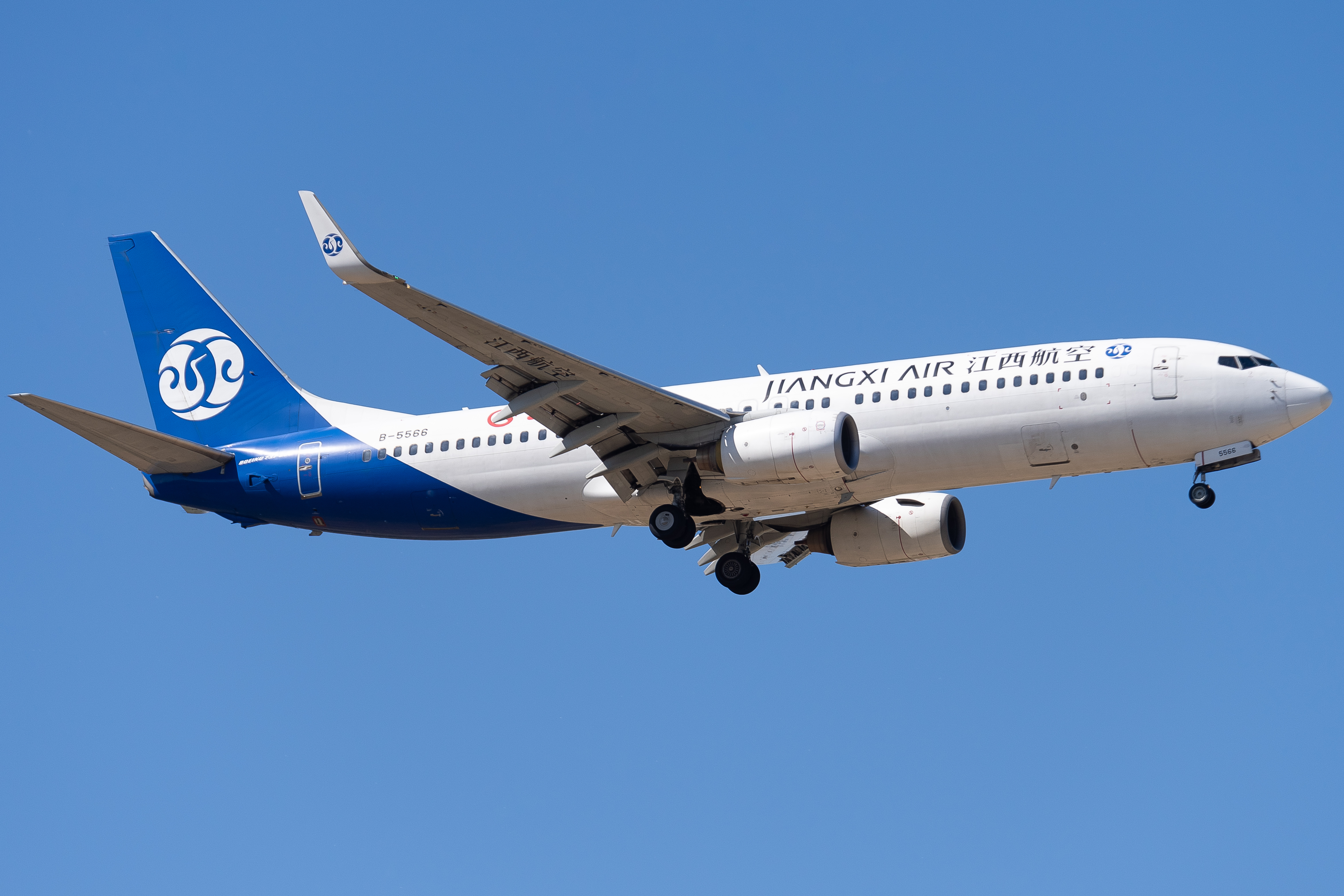
Boeing 737-800 of Jiangxi Air

As of August 2025, Jiangxi Air operates the following aircraft:

Jiangxi Air fleet
Aircraft	In service	Orders	Passengers			Notes
Aircraft	In service	Orders	J	Y	Total	Notes
Boeing 737-800	13	—	8	162	170	
Comac C909	5	30	—	90	90	Deliveries began in 2020.
Total	18	30				
