= Ganzhou Ruijin Airport =

Ganzhou Ruijin Airport 赣州瑞金机场
- IATA: JRJ; ICAO: ZSRJ

Summary
- Airport type: Public
- Serves: Ruijin, Jiangxi, China
- Opened: 28 September 2025; 9 months ago
- Coordinates: 25.9608°N 116.0775°E

Map
- Location of airport in Jiangxi

Runways
Direction	Length		Surface
Direction	m	ft	Surface
	2,600	8,530

Ganzhou Ruijin Airport
- Simplified Chinese: 赣州瑞金机场
- Traditional Chinese: 贛州瑞金機場
Transcriptions
Standard Mandarin
- Hanyu Pinyin: Gànzhōu Ruìjīn Jīchǎng

Ganzhou Ruijin Airport (IATA: JRJ, ICAO: ZSRJ) is an airport located in Ruijin county-level city of Ganzhou City in Jiangxi Province of East China. Ganzhou Ruijin Airport opened on 28 September 2025.

== Airlines and destinations ==
Airlines	Destinations
Air China	Beijing–Daxing
China Eastern Airlines	Shanghai–Pudong
Jiangxi Air	Zunyi–Xinzhou

== First flight ==
- Flight No.CA8697
- Departure time: 7:30 am on September 28
- Landing time: 10:15 am on September 28

== See also ==
- List of airports in China
- List of the busiest airports in China
