= Jani (surname) =

Origin
- Language: Sanskrit
- Origin: Jnana
- Meaning: Learned
- Region of origin: Indian subcontinent

Other names
- Alternative spelling: Jyani, Gyani, Giani
- Usage: Bishnois, Brahmins, Jats, Indher

Jani is a surname.

The Indian surname meaning 'learned' (from Sanskrit jnana, 'knowledge') is found among Brahmins in the western state of Gujarat, and is a Gotra and surname among Jats and Bishnois in the Western Rajasthan

Gyani, an honorific title from Sikhism also meaning learned, is from the same root

== Linguistic Roots of Jani ==
The Sanskrit root ज्ञा- jñā- shares its origins with Slavic znati, the English word know, along with the Greek γνώ- (seen in γνῶσις gnosis) and Lithuanian žinoti. On the contrary, its opposite is represented by अज्ञान ajñāna, which translates to "ignorance."

== People with the name ==
=== Arts and entertainment ===
- Agha Jani Kashmiri, was an Indian screenwriter, former actor and Urdu poet
- Ayaz Jani, was a Sindhi-language poet
- Chirag Jani (actor), an Indian film Actor
- Jyotish Jani, novelist, poet and short story writer from Gujarat, India
- Kamiya Jani, an Indian YouTuber, entrepreneur, and social media influencer
- Nirmal Jani, Indian cinematographer
- Purnamasi Jani, poet, social activist from India

=== Business and law ===
- Reshma Saujani, American lawyer
- Tushar Jani, business entrepreneur, investor, philanthropist

=== Politics and government ===
- Alauddin Jani, governor of Bengal during the time of Mamluk dynasty
- Babajani Durrani, an Indian politician
- Jagadish Jani, Indian politician
- Masud Jani, the Governor of Bengal, 1247–1251 CE
- Surjit Kumar Jyani, Indian politician

=== Religion and spirituality ===
- Mulji Jani, known as Gunatitanand Swami a Hindu spiritual teacher
- Prahlad Jani, Indian breatharian monk
- Sayyid Jani Shah, a Muslim Pir who accepted Dharma

=== Sciences and education ===
- A. N. Jani, Indian scholar and Indologist
- Karan Jani, an Indian astrophysicist
- Shyam Sunder Jyani, Indian environmentalist and academic
- Nikhil Jani, Software Test automation engineer

=== Sports ===
- Chirag Jani (cricketer), an Indian cricketer
- Neel Jani, Swiss professional Porsche factory driver. His father is from India and his mother is German Swiss.
- Réka Luca Jani, a Hungarian female tennis player

== See also ==
- Jahani
- Jani (given name)
