= XiamenAir =

Chinese airline

XiamenAir 厦门航空

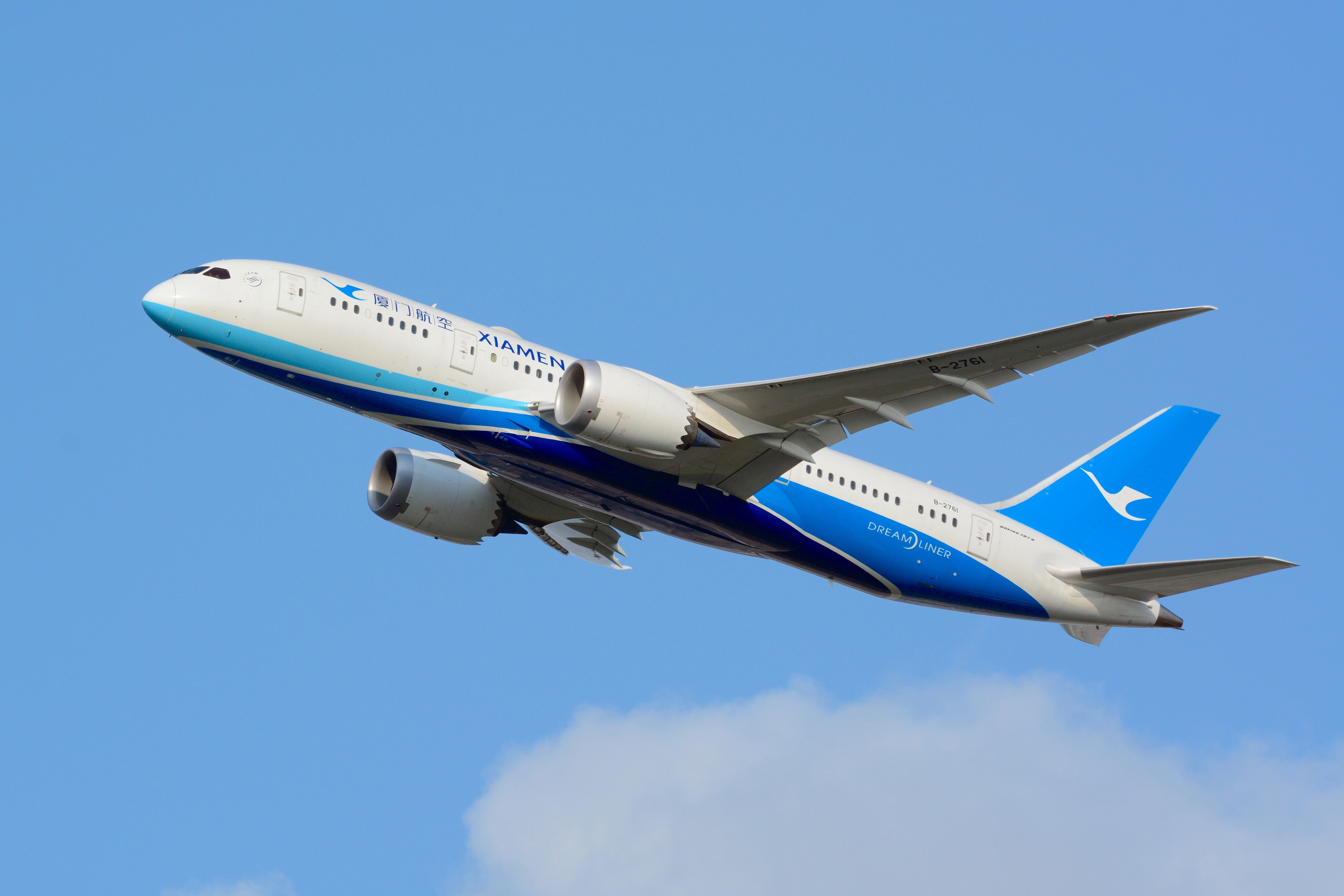
- XiamenAir Boeing 787-8 in 2018
IATA	ICAO	Call sign
MF	CXA	XIAMEN AIR
- Founded: July 25, 1984; 42 years ago
- Hubs: Fuzhou; Xiamen
- Secondary hubs: Beijing–Daxing; Hangzhou
- Focus cities: Changsha; Chongqing; Quanzhou; Shanghai–Hongqiao; Tianjin; Yinchuan
- Frequent-flyer program: Egret Miles
- Fleet size: 172
- Destinations: 103
- Parent company: China Southern Airlines (51%)
- Headquarters: 22 Dailiao Road, Xiamen, Fujian
- Key people: Xie Bing (president & CEO); Zhao Dong (chairman)
- Website: www.xiamenair.com

XiamenAir
- Simplified Chinese: 厦门航空
- Traditional Chinese: 廈門航空
- Hanyu Pinyin: Xiàmén Hángkōng
- Literal meaning: Xiamen Airlines
Transcriptions
Standard Mandarin
- Hanyu Pinyin: Xiàmén Hángkōng
Southern Min
- Hokkien POJ: E-mng Hang-khong

Xiamen Airlines (/ʃ(j)ɑːˈmɛn/ sh(y)ah-MEN), branded as XiamenAir, is an airline based in Xiamen, Fujian, China. XiamenAir has its northern headquarters in Beijing and nine branches in Fuzhou, Hangzhou, Tianjin, Changsha, Beijing, Quanzhou, Chongqing, Shanghai and Yinchuan, and two subsidiaries in Hebei Airlines (99.47% shareholding) and Jiangxi Airlines (60% shareholding, based on the former Xiamen Airlines Nanchang Branch). Founded on 25 July 1984, XiamenAir is the first airline in China to operate independently as an enterprise. It was established as a joint venture between the Shanghai Administration of Civil Aviation Administration of China, Xiamen Special Economic Zone Construction Development Company (now Xiamen C&D Group) and Fujian Investment Enterprise Company. The shareholders are China Southern Airlines Corporation (55%), Xiamen C&D Group (34%) and Fujian Investment and Development Group (11%). The current chairman of XiamenAir is Zhao Dong and the general manager is Wang Zhixue.

XiamenAir operates more than 320 domestic and international routes from Xiamen Gaoqi International Airport, Beijing Daxing International Airport, Fuzhou Changle International Airport and Hangzhou Xiaoshan International Airport, with 3,500 to 4,000 flights per week and carries nearly 25 million passengers per year. XiamenAir's logo is "A Heron Flying High", a well-known trademark in China, and its frequent flyer program is the XiamenAir White Egret Frequent Flyer Program. The airline features in-flight announcements in Mandarin and English, but also in Minnan, which are broadcast by Xia Hui, a former broadcaster for the Central People's Radio station and Xiamen Broadcasting Company.

XiamenAir is the 19th member of the international airline alliance SkyTeam and the first mainland Chinese airline outside the three major state-owned carriers to join one of the world's three major airline alliances. It became the fourth full SkyTeam member in Greater China, after China Southern, China Eastern, and Taiwan-based China Airlines.

== History ==
=== Xiamen Civil Aviation ===
The history of Xiamen's aviation industry can be traced back to the Xiamen Wutong Civil Aviation Academy in 1928, which was one of the only three aviation academies in the Republic of China at that time.

In 1929, the Zhangxia Navy established the Zengcuo Aun Naval Airport in Xiamen, and in 1932, the China Airlines Xiamen Office, a joint venture between China and the United States, operated air transportation to various places. Later, the airport was abandoned due to the Japanese invasion of China.

In 1941, during the Second World War, the Japanese who occupied Xiamen built Gaoqi Airport in the east of Gaoqi Village for both military and civilian use. From 5 December of the same year, first commercial flight between Xiamen and Taipei took off and landed at Gaoqi Airport.

After Japan's defeat and surrender, Gaoqi Airport was taken over by the Nationalist government and converted to a civilian airport on 1 November 1947. On 24 August 1949, the last scheduled Xiamen to Taipei flight took off from Gaoqi Airport to Taipei and then was discontinued (the route was not converted to a regular service until 2006, when holiday charters resumed, and after December 2008). For the next 33 years, Xiamen's aviation industry was disrupted and Gaoqi Airport was abandoned after a brief period of military use.

After the founding of the People's Republic of China, Xiamen was in a state of war for a long time and had no civil aviation airport of its own because of its location on the front of the Taiwan Strait. At that time, the citizens of Xiamen could only travel by boat or train. This contradiction was even more prominent after the establishment of Xiamen Special Economic Zone. On 10 January 1982, the Central Military Commission and the State Council approved the construction of Xiamen Gaoqi Airport. In October of the following year.

However, the airport had no airline that operated as a hub, and still could not solve the issue of lack of capacity. At the opening ceremony of Xiamen Airport, Zhang Ru, Vice Governor of Fujian Province Government, proposed to Shen Tu, Director of the Civil Aviation Administration of China (CAAC), who attended the opening ceremony, that the CAAC and Fujian Province cooperate to establish an airline company, and received support on the spot. Immediately afterwards, the CPC Fujian Provincial Committee assigned Vice Governor Zhang Ru and Vice Mayor of Xiamen City Xiang Zhen to work with Director Wang Dao of the Planning Department of CAAC to study the establishment of an airline company.

=== Founding ===
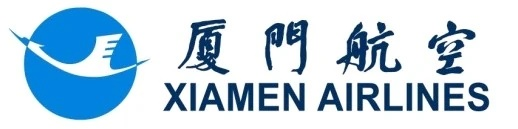
XiamenAir old logo was used from 1984 to 25 July 2012

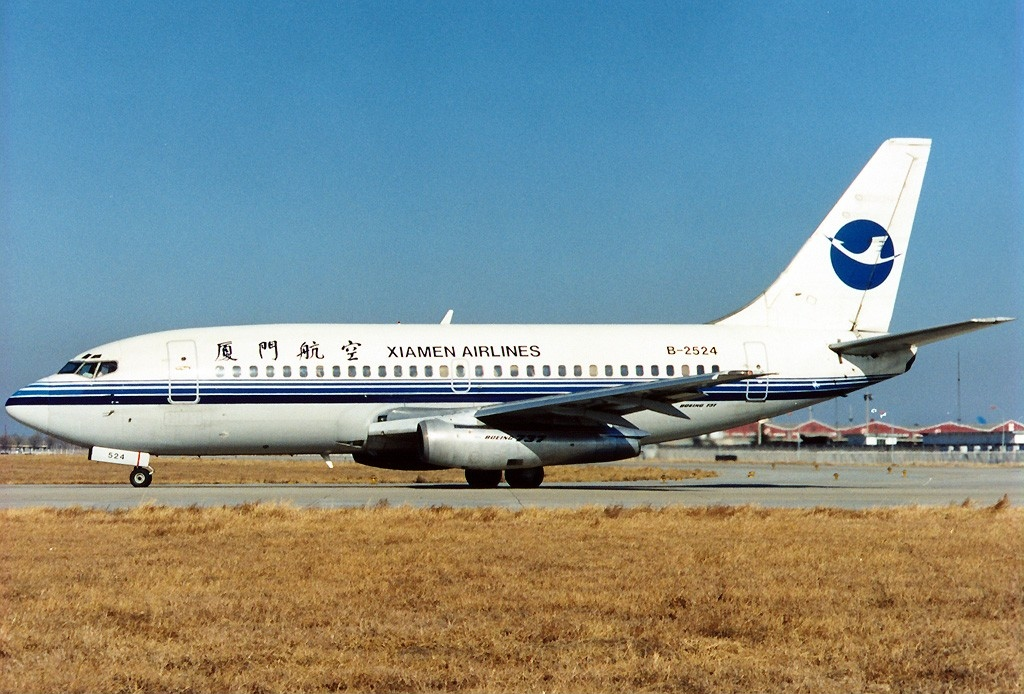
XiamenAir Boeing 737-200

On 16 October 1983, the chairman of Aloha Airlines, Chen Qing who is a Chinese American, visited Xiamen to study the plan of establishing a Sino-foreign joint venture airline in Xiamen. Wu Zhongliang, who was involved in the establishment of Xiamen Airlines at that time, recalled that Aloha Airlines even had the intention of moving its base to Xiamen at that time.

On 10 January 1984, the Xiamen Municipal Government drafted the "Conceptual Plan and Opinions on Sino-foreign Joint Venture to Operate China Xiamen Special Zone United Airlines Co. Ltd." On 25 January, representatives from Fujian Province and Xiamen City went to the Civil Aviation Administration of China (CAAC) for project report, mentioning that priority would be given to joint undertakings by CAAC and Fujian Province as long as aircraft and funds were guaranteed. Subsequently, the CAAC, Fujian Province and Xiamen City held a special meeting on the proposed joint venture airline proposal, and finally rejected the joint venture airline proposal drawn up by the Xiamen City Government on the basis of air rights and other issues.

On 2 March 1984, the Civil Aviation Administration of China and Fujian Provincial Government jointly issued the "Approval of Agreement on Joint Venture Operation of Xiamen Airlines Co. Ltd. Xiamen Air Co. Ltd was officially established on 25 July 1984, as the first comprehensive local airline company and the first joint venture between the central and local governments. Gaoqi Airport have being chosen for the base of this new funded airline.

At the early years of the airline, Xiamen Airlines set itself as a regional airline, but the investment of 20 million RMB from the three shareholders was not available at the beginning of its establishment, and it only registered with a bank account with 5,000 RMB, without any aircraft and livery.

On 5 January 1985, 9:55 a.m., a wet-leased Boeing 737 airliner of Xiamen Airlines landed safely at Beijing Capital Airport at 12:27 p.m. after 2 hours and 32 minutes of flight time, which was the first route opened by Xiamen Airlines. In the afternoon, the company's second route, Xiamen-Guangzhou, was also officially opened, with the participation of Jiang Ping, vice mayor of Xiamen, and leaders of Xiamen Airlines, etc. On 10 January, the company opened its third route, Xiamen-Shanghai. In these routes, the aircraft of Civil Aviation Administration of Shanghai operates Shanghai-Xiamen and Xiamen-Guangzhou routes once per week; the aircraft of Civil Aviation Administration of Guangzhou (the predecessor of China Southern Airlines) operates Guangzhou-Xiamen, Xiamen-Beijing routes and Xiamen-Hong Kong charter flights once per week. On 12 February 1985, Xiamen Airlines leased its first 737-200 aircraft, and on 18 December 1985, the third meeting of the first board of directors and the first meeting of the second board of directors of Xiamen Airlines decided to transfer the shares of the Civil Aviation Administration of Shanghai for Xiamen Airlines to the Civil Aviation Administration of Guangzhou, with the same ratio of capital contribution from each party. The agreement of joint venture operation of Xiamen Airlines by the three shareholders and the articles of association of Xiamen Airlines were amended and submitted for approval and became effective on 1 January 1986. On 16 November, the first 737-200 aircraft was transferred from Guangzhou to Xiamen as the base of Xiamen Airlines. In November 1987, Xiamen Airlines introduced the second 737-200 aircraft, and in this year, Xiamen Airlines reversed the operating loss of the first three years and made a profit of 3.17 million RMB for the first time.

=== Expansion ===
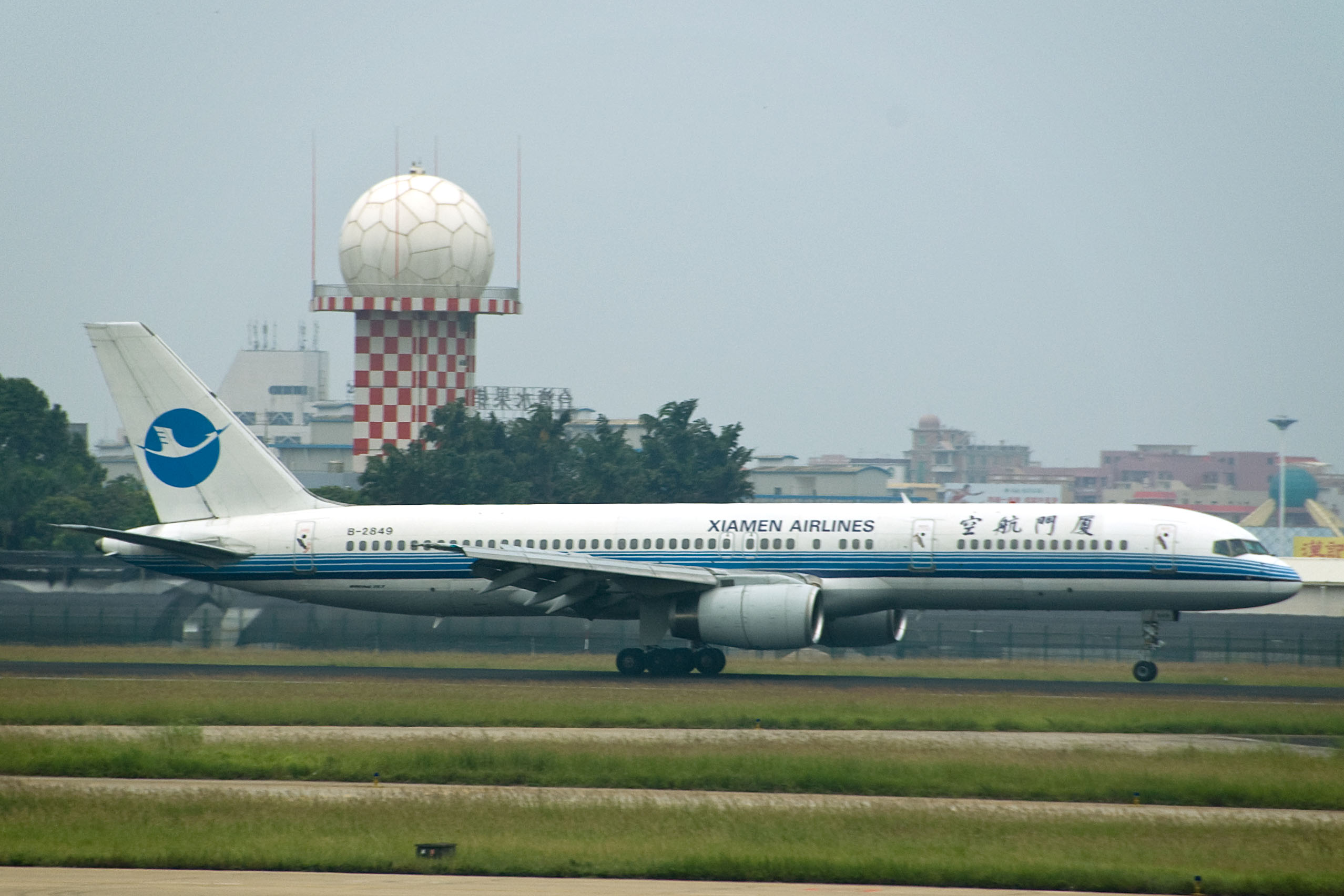
Boeing 757-200 in XiamenAir's first generation livery landing at Xiamen Gaoqi International Airport

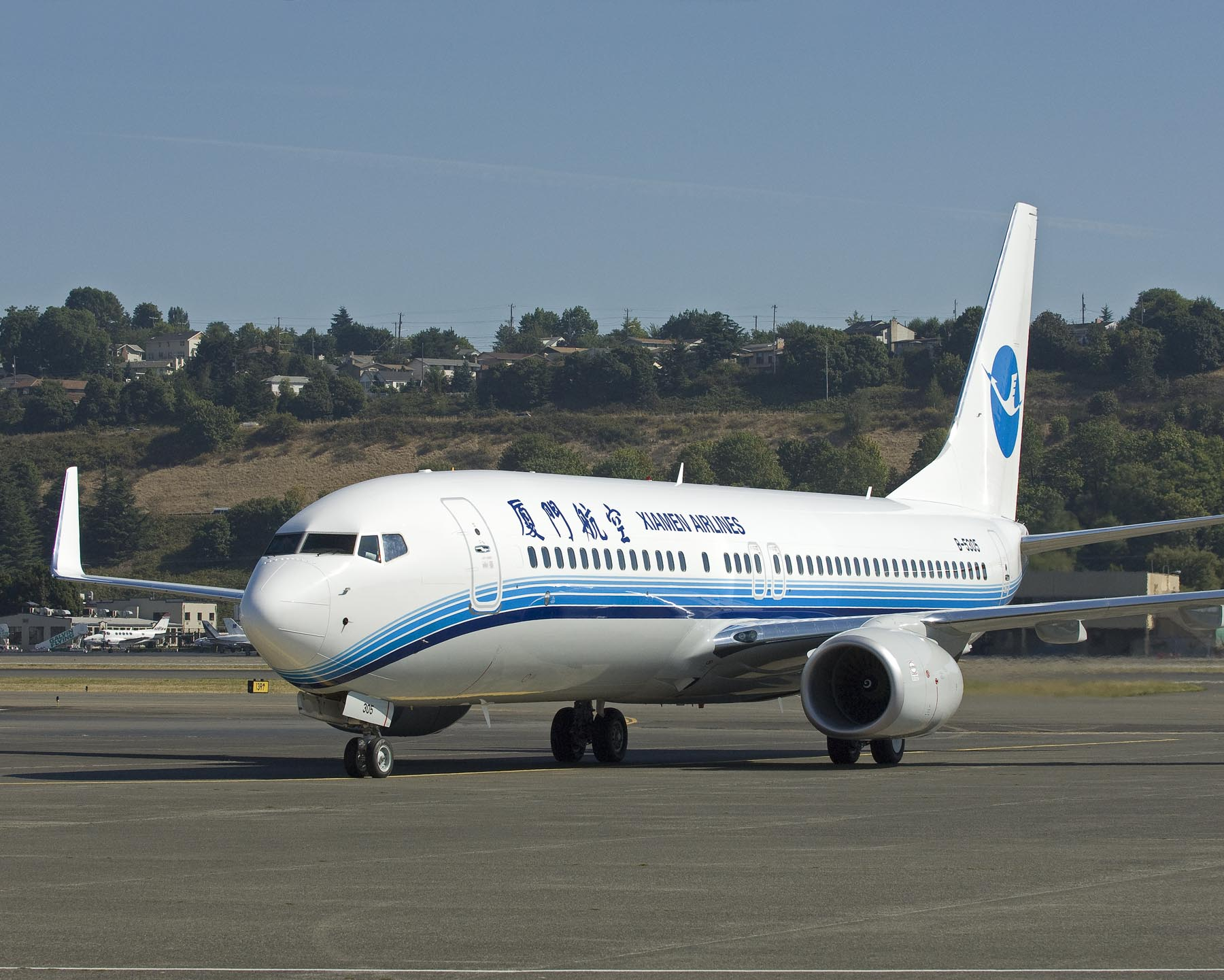
Xiamen Airlines Boeing 737-800 in a second generation livery

Xiamen Airlines has made innovative breakthroughs in corporate organization, operation and management, and transportation services. At the time of its establishment, Xiamen Airlines was positioned as an independently accounted, self-financing limited liability company. In 1989, reforms were made to the organization, personnel management, labor distribution, housing system, medical insurance, employee benefits, etc. In 1997, the contract system for employees was implemented.

On 16 November 1986, the first aircraft of Xiamen Airlines was transferred from Guangzhou to Xiamen to start its operation. In the same year, Xiamen Airlines bid farewell to its losses and opened the curtain on 27 years of continuous profitability. On 8 August 1988, Xiamen Airlines took over the ownership of its first new passenger aircraft from Boeing (Xiamen Airlines had previously operated old aircraft sold to Xiamen Airlines by China Southern Airlines and Southwest Airlines). The aircraft was a Boeing 737-25C Advanced (registration number B-2524), the last Boeing 737 classic airliner produced by Boeing Civil Aircraft. The aircraft was retired from service in 2003 and resold to Blue Dart Express.

In 1991, the General Administration of Civil Aviation (GACA) approved Xiamen Airlines to adopt "Blue Sky and White Heron" as its corporate logo. In the same year, the Civil Aviation Administration separated the government and enterprises and established China Southern Airlines, and the shares held by the Civil Aviation Guangzhou Administration were transferred to China Southern Airlines.

On 12 August 1992, Xiamen Airlines took delivery of its first Boeing 757-200 aircraft, registered as B-2819, which was also the 100th aircraft delivered to the Chinese civil aviation system by Boeing. This aircraft was retired in 2008 and sold to Blue Dart Aviation who converted the aircraft to a cargo plane.

In 2000, Xiamen Airlines launched the service between Xiamen and Bangkok, which was the first international service of Xiamen Airlines and operated as MF897/8.

=== Recent developments ===
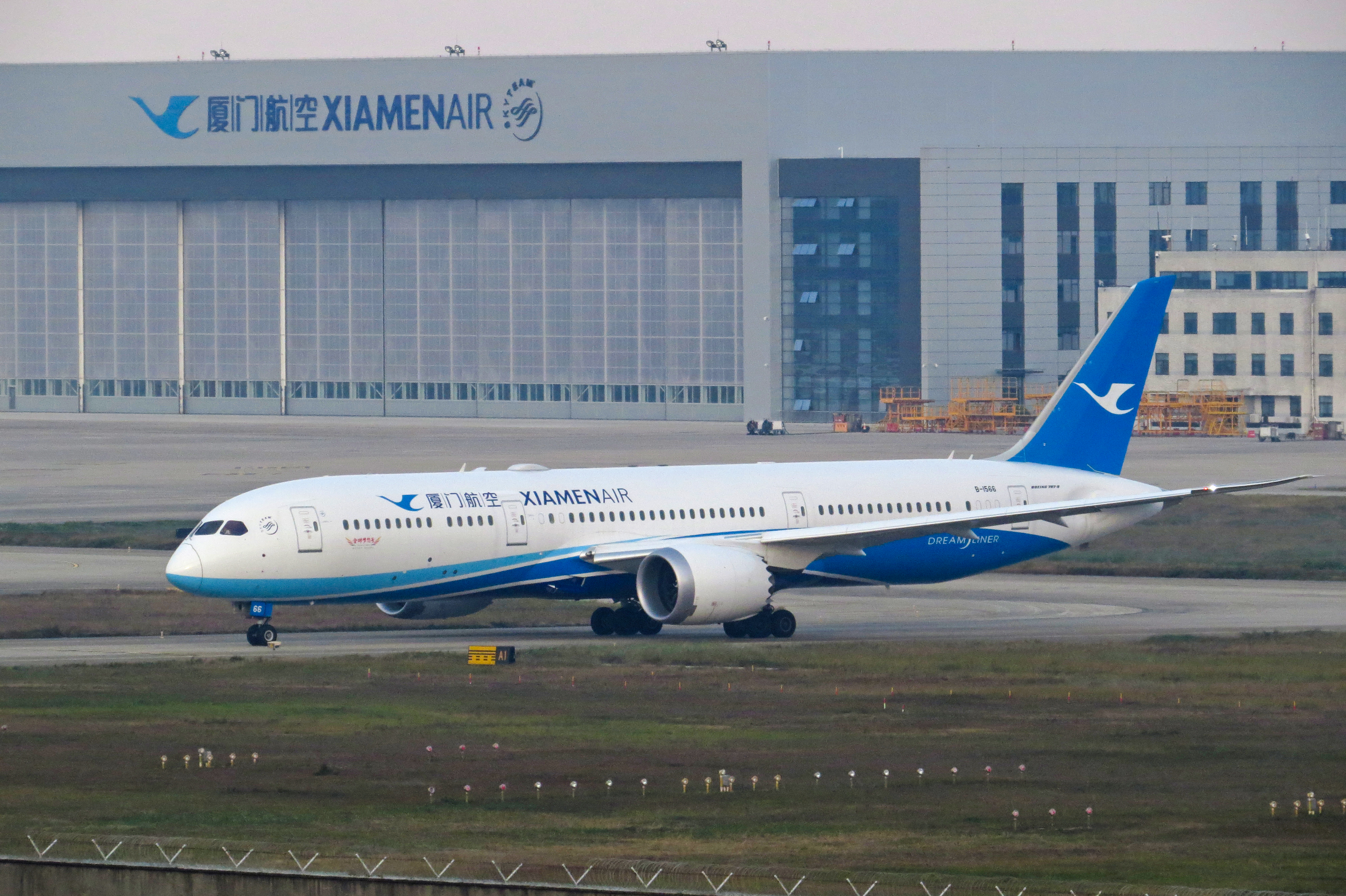
XiamenAir Boeing 787-9 Dreamliner

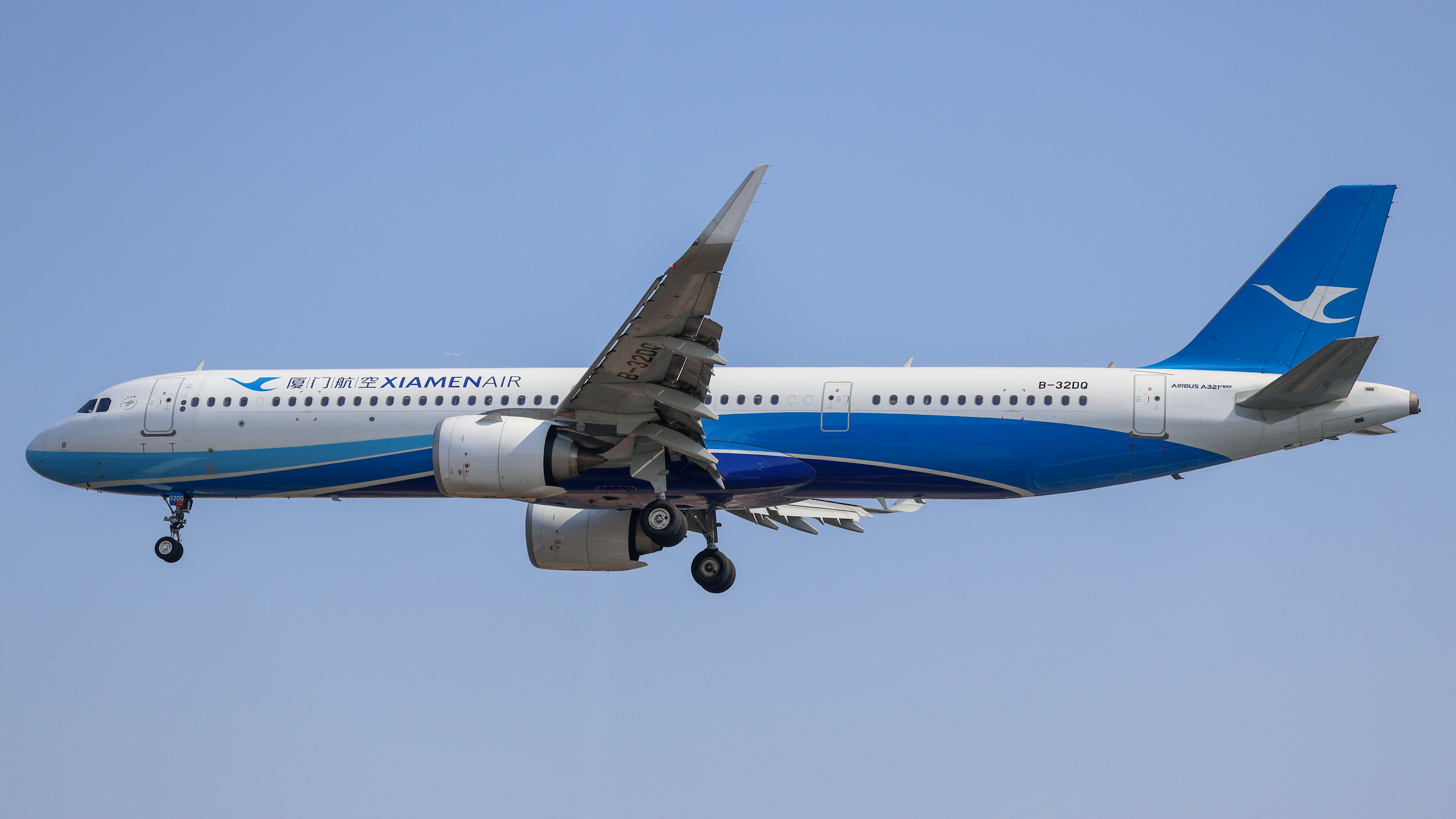
XiamenAir Airbus A321neo

On 17 November 2011, SkyTeam officially announced the details of XiamenAir's membership in the alliance and signed a letter of intent to join the alliance in Rome, Italy. On 21 November 2012, XiamenAir officially became the 19th member of SkyTeam and added three new hubs to the alliance—Xiamen, Fuzhou and Hangzhou. China Southern, the parent company of XiamenAir, withdrew from SkyTeam on 1 January 2019.

On 25 July 2012, Xiamen Airlines changed its VI logo for the first time from "Blue Sky with White Heron" to "One Heron Flying High" and the aircraft painting theme was changed from "Reform Music" to "Sea and Sky". The theme of the aircraft painting was changed from "Reform Music" to "Sea and Sky". To upgrade the logo of Xiamen Airlines, the Chinese design master Chen Youjian and TEAGUE, the design team appointed by Boeing, were invited to design, revise and prove the new corporate logo, hence the rebranding to XiamenAir.

On 1 December 2018, XiamenAir's last Boeing 757 (No. B-2868) was retired after its last flight from Shanghai Hongqiao-Xiamen, and since then there have been no Boeing 757 passenger aircraft in Greater China.

As China's aviation sector developed, the airline expanded to regional Asian destinations while the delivery of wide-body Boeing 787 Dreamliners permitted the airline to offer long-distance services. The airline's first intercontinental expansion was to Europe, which commenced with an Amsterdam service from 26 July 2015, and a Paris service from 11 December 2018. Services to Sydney followed from 30 November 2015, and Melbourne a year later. The airline's first North American service, to Vancouver, was launched on 26 July 2016. XiamenAir launched its first U.S. service to Seattle in September 2016, followed by New York JFK in February 2017 and Los Angeles in June 2017.

By early 2020, the airline had set up bases at Fuzhou Changle International Airport, Nanchang Changbei International Airport, Hangzhou Xiaoshan International Airport, Tianjin Binhai International Airport, Changsha Huanghua International Airport, Beijing Daxing International Airport (moved from Beijing Capital International Airport in 2020), Quanzhou Jinjiang International Airport, Chongqing Jiangbei International Airport and Shanghai Hongqiao International Airport.

== Destinations ==
XiamenAir line-up at one of its primary hubs, Fuzhou Changle International Airport, in 2017

Country/region	City	Airport	Status	Refs
Australia	Melbourne	Melbourne Airport		
Australia	Sydney	Sydney Airport		
Indonesia	Denpasar	Ngurah Rai International Airport		
Indonesia	Jakarta	Soekarno-Hatta International Airport		
Malaysia	Kuala Lumpur	Kuala Lumpur International Airport		
United States	New York	John F. Kennedy International Airport		

In October 2025, the Fuzhou–New York JFK route became the world's longest commercial flight, with a scheduled duration of around 19 hours and 20 minutes. The route included a refuelling stop at Tokyo Narita Airport and avoided Russian airspace.

== Airline agreements ==
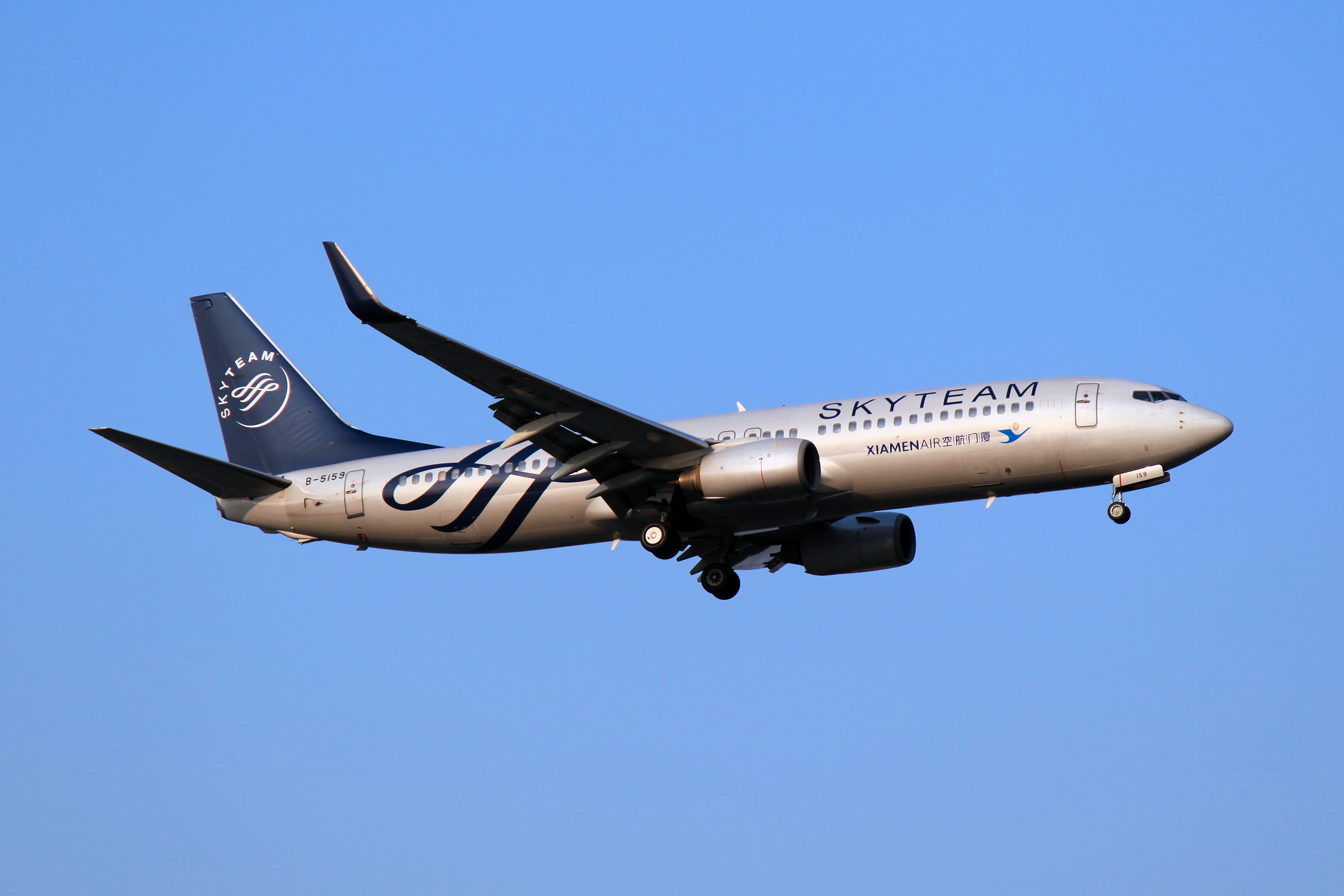
XiamenAir Boeing 737-800 in SkyTeam livery

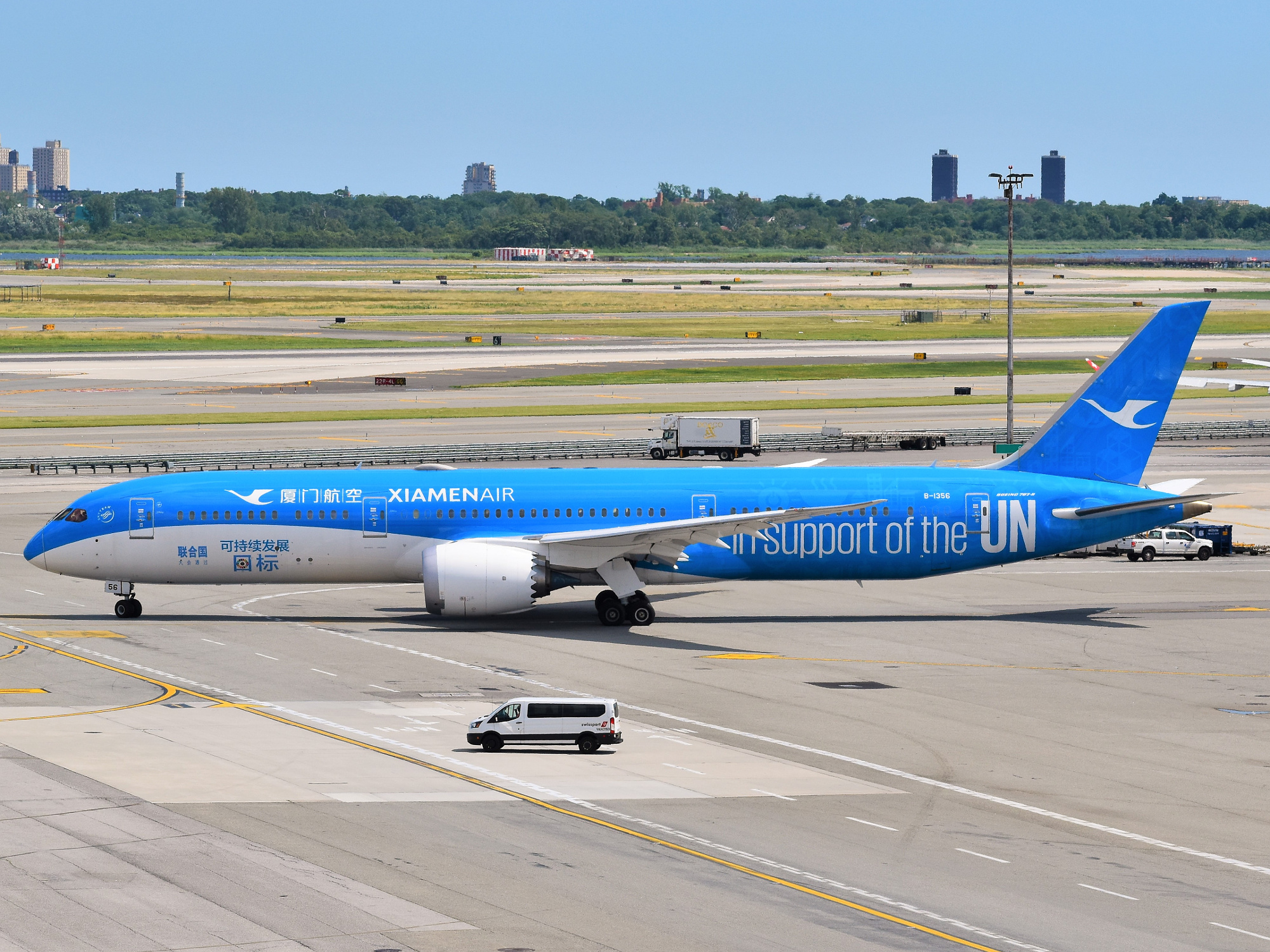
XiamenAir Boeing 787-9 Dreamliner in a special United Nations Sustainable Living livery

=== Alliance ===
On 17 November 2011, XiamenAir signed a memorandum of understanding with the airline alliance SkyTeam. On 21 November 2012, the airline was officially welcomed as the 19th member of SkyTeam.

=== Codeshare agreements ===
XiamenAir has codeshare agreements with the following airlines:

- Air France (Joint Venture Partners)
- Bangkok Airways
- China Eastern Airlines
- China Express Airlines
- China Southern Airlines (Joint Venture Partners)
- Garuda Indonesia
- Hebei Airlines (subsidiary)
- ITA Airways
- Japan Airlines
- Jiangxi Air (subsidiary)
- Loong Air
- KLM (Joint Venture Partners)
- Korean Air
- Malaysia Airlines
- Mandarin Airlines
- Philippine Airlines
- Qatar Airways
- Saudia
- Sichuan Airlines
- Scandinavian Airlines
- Vietnam Airlines

=== Interline agreements ===
XiamenAir has interline agreements with the following airlines:

- Batik Air Malaysia
- China Railway (railway)
- Virgin Atlantic

=== Joint venture agreements ===
XiamenAir has joint venture agreements with the following airlines:

- Air France
- China Southern Airlines
- KLM

== Fleet ==
=== Current fleet ===
With XiamenAir formally introducing 15 Airbus A321neos under operating leases in October 2022, it ended a 37-year record of an all-Boeing fleet since its foundation and started a new era of an "Airbus-Boeing" fleet.

As of July 2026, XiamenAir operates the following aircraft:

XiamenAir fleet
Aircraft	In service	Orders	Passengers				Notes
Aircraft	In service	Orders	F	J	Y	Total	Notes
Airbus A320neo	5	15	—	—	180	180	Deliveries from 2024.
Airbus A321neo	17	53	—	8	200	208	
Boeing 737-700	4	—	—	8	120	128	
Boeing 737-800	110	—	—	8	156	164	
Boeing 737-800	110	—	—	8	162	170	
Boeing 737-800	110	—	—	—	184	184	
Boeing 737 MAX 8	28	4	—	—	184	184	Deliveries started in May 2018.
Boeing 737 MAX 10	—	10	TBA				Order from the parent company.
Boeing 787-8	6	—	4	18	215	237	2 aircraft are transferred to Royal Air Maroc.
Boeing 787-9	6	—	—	30	257	287	Order transferred from the parent company.
XiamenAir Cargo fleet
Boeing 737-800BCF	1	—	Cargo				
Total	172	82					

XiamenAir Airbus A321neo in 2025

XiamenAir Boeing 737-700 in 2014

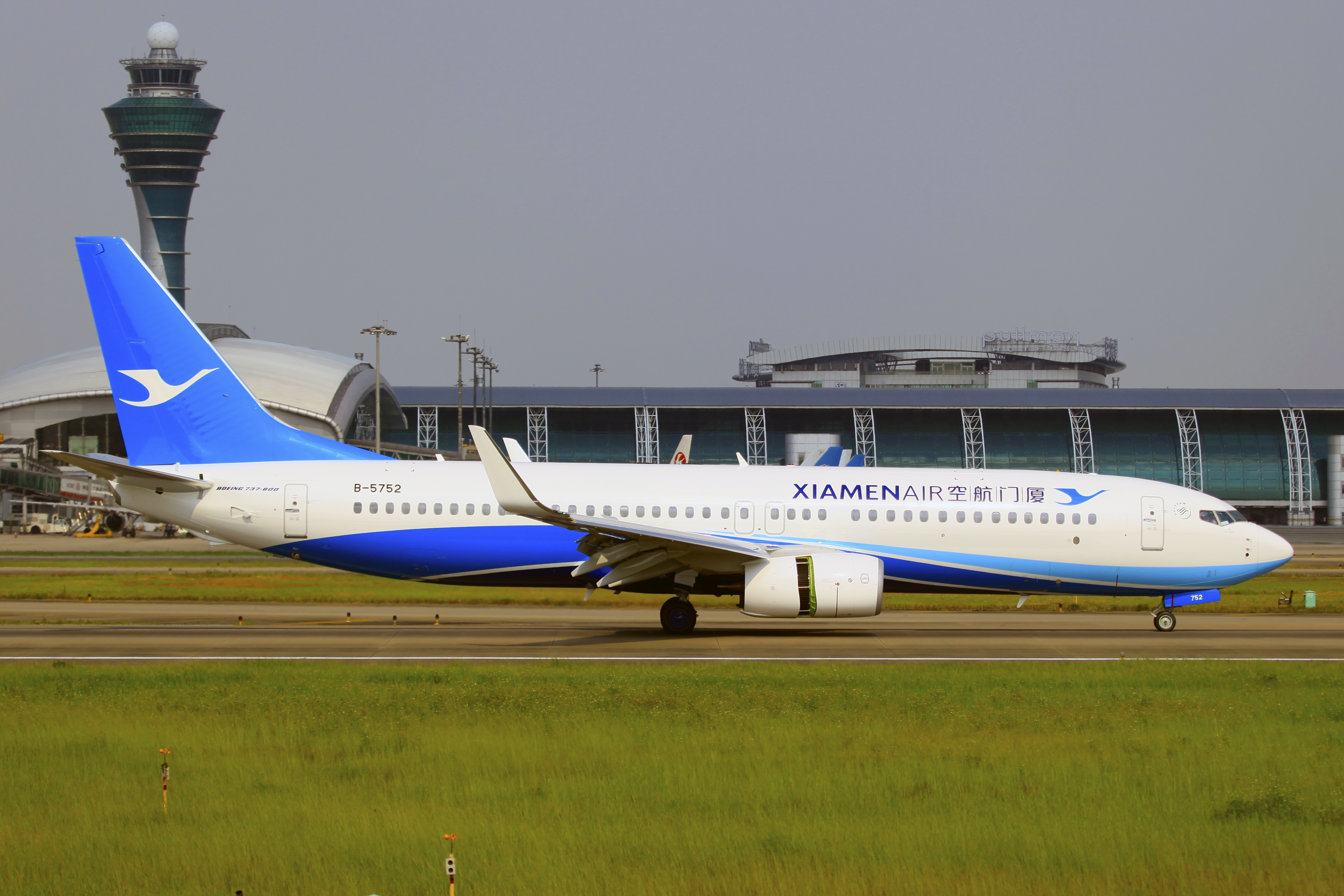
XiamenAir Boeing 737-800 in 2013

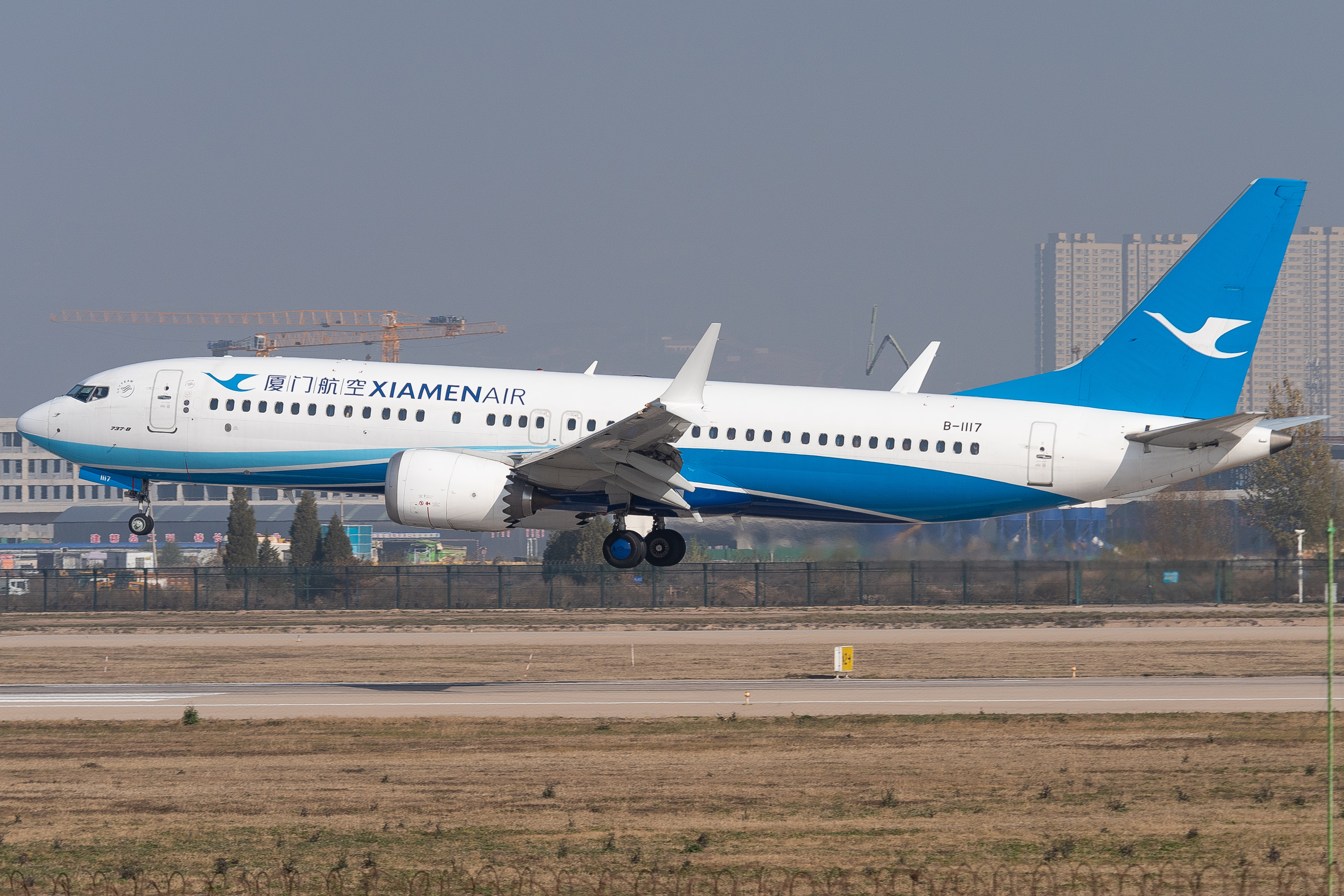
XiamenAir Boeing 737 MAX 8 in 2024

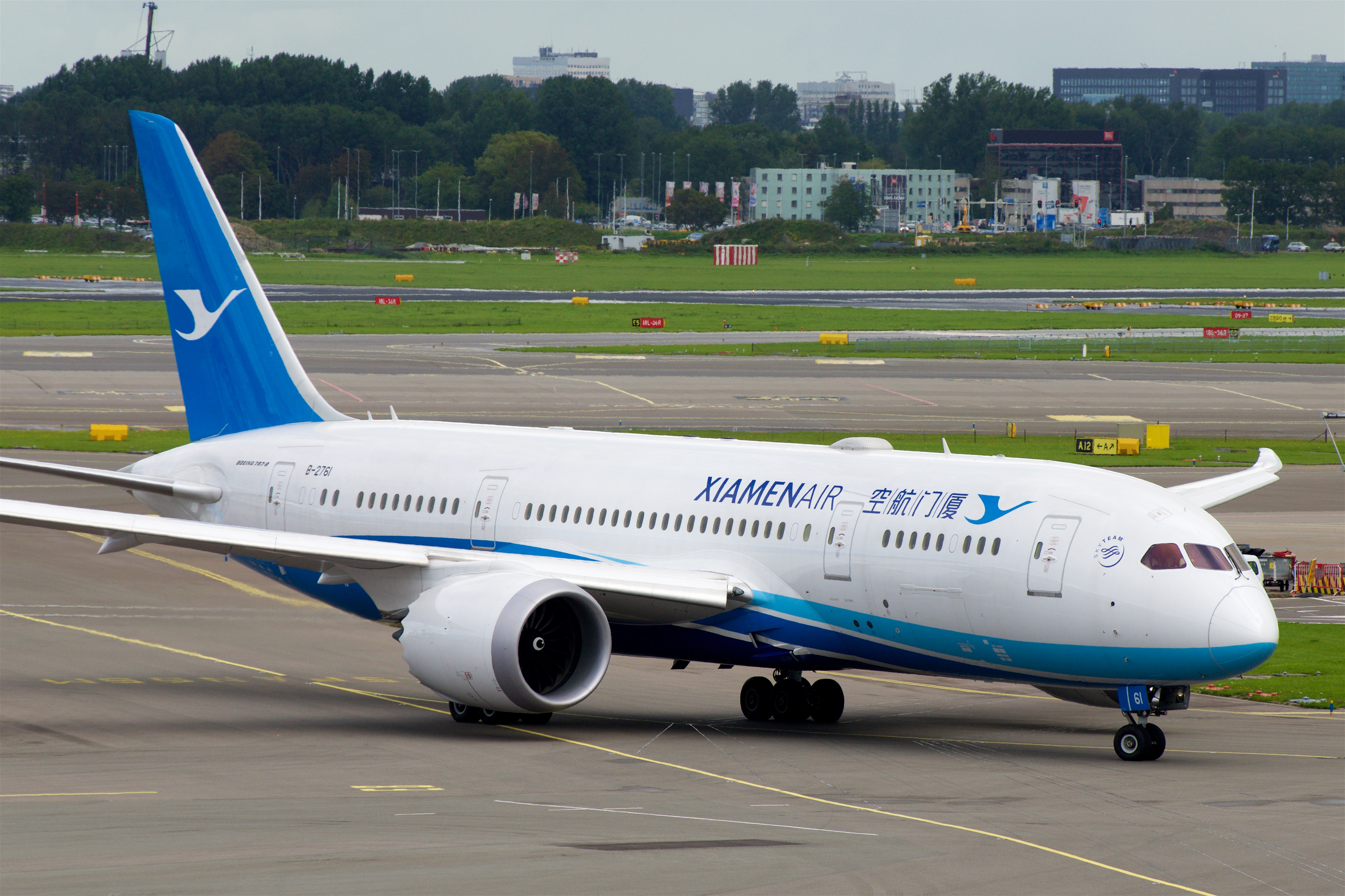
XiamenAir Boeing 787-8 in 2015

XiamenAir Boeing 787-9 in 2017

=== Former fleet ===
XiamenAir former fleet
Aircraft	Total	Introduced	Retired	Notes
Boeing 737-200	9	1984	2003	
Boeing 737-300	4	2000	2007	
Boeing 737-500	7	1993	2010	
Boeing 757-200	9	1992	2018	

XiamenAir Boeing 737-200 in 1993

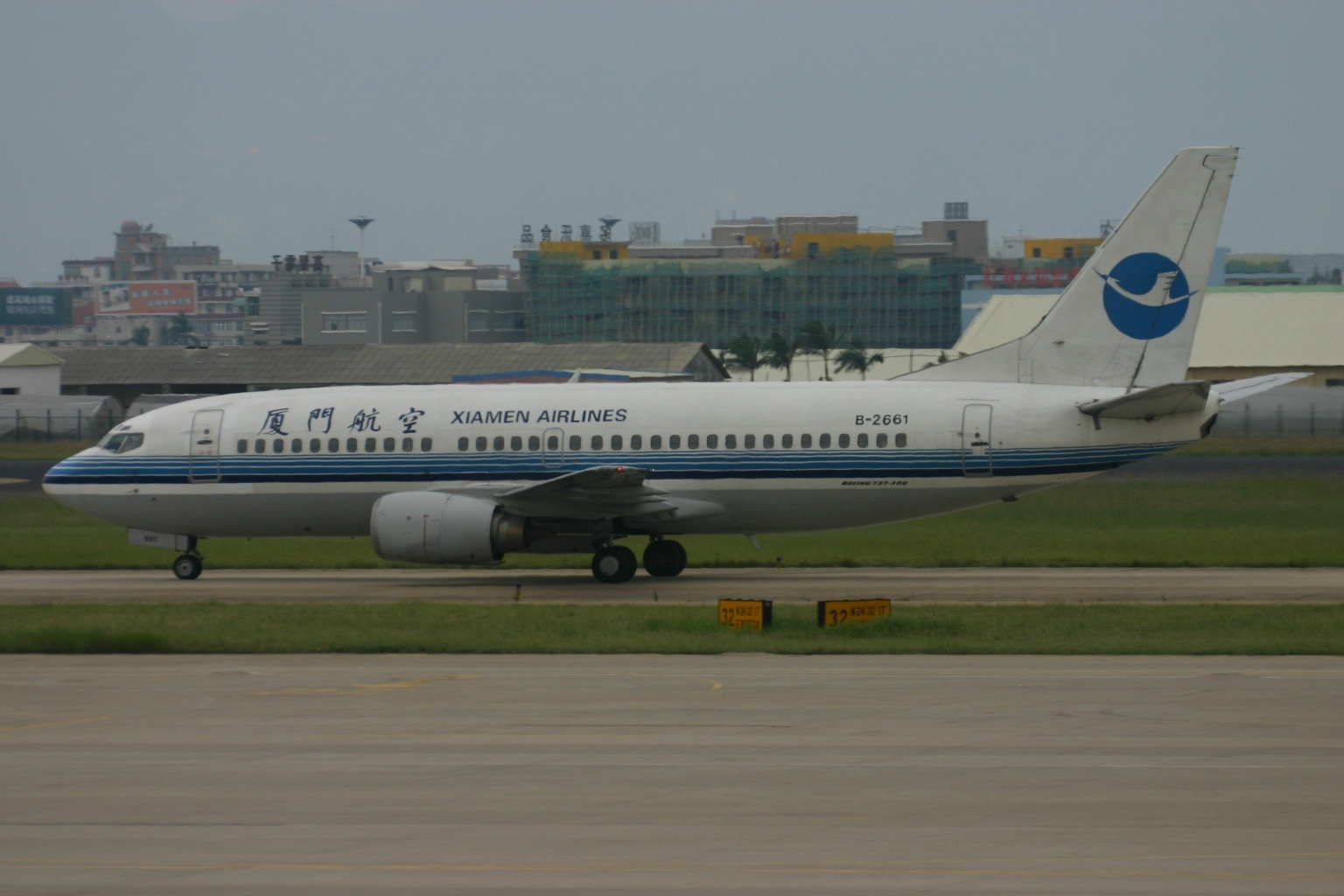
XiamenAir Boeing 737-300 in 2005

XiamenAir Boeing 737-500 in 1999

XiamenAir Boeing 757-200 in 2014

== Cabin services ==
Currently, XiamenAir provides first-class services with business class seats on domestic routes in China as usual. On international and regional routes, business class and economy class services are offered as usual. The Boeing 787-8 has 180-degree lie-flat seats in both First and Business Class and is equipped with Panasonic EX3 personal TV entertainment system with charging outlets and USB ports in all three classes. B-2760, B-2761, B-2762, and later 787-9s have in-flight Wi-Fi access.

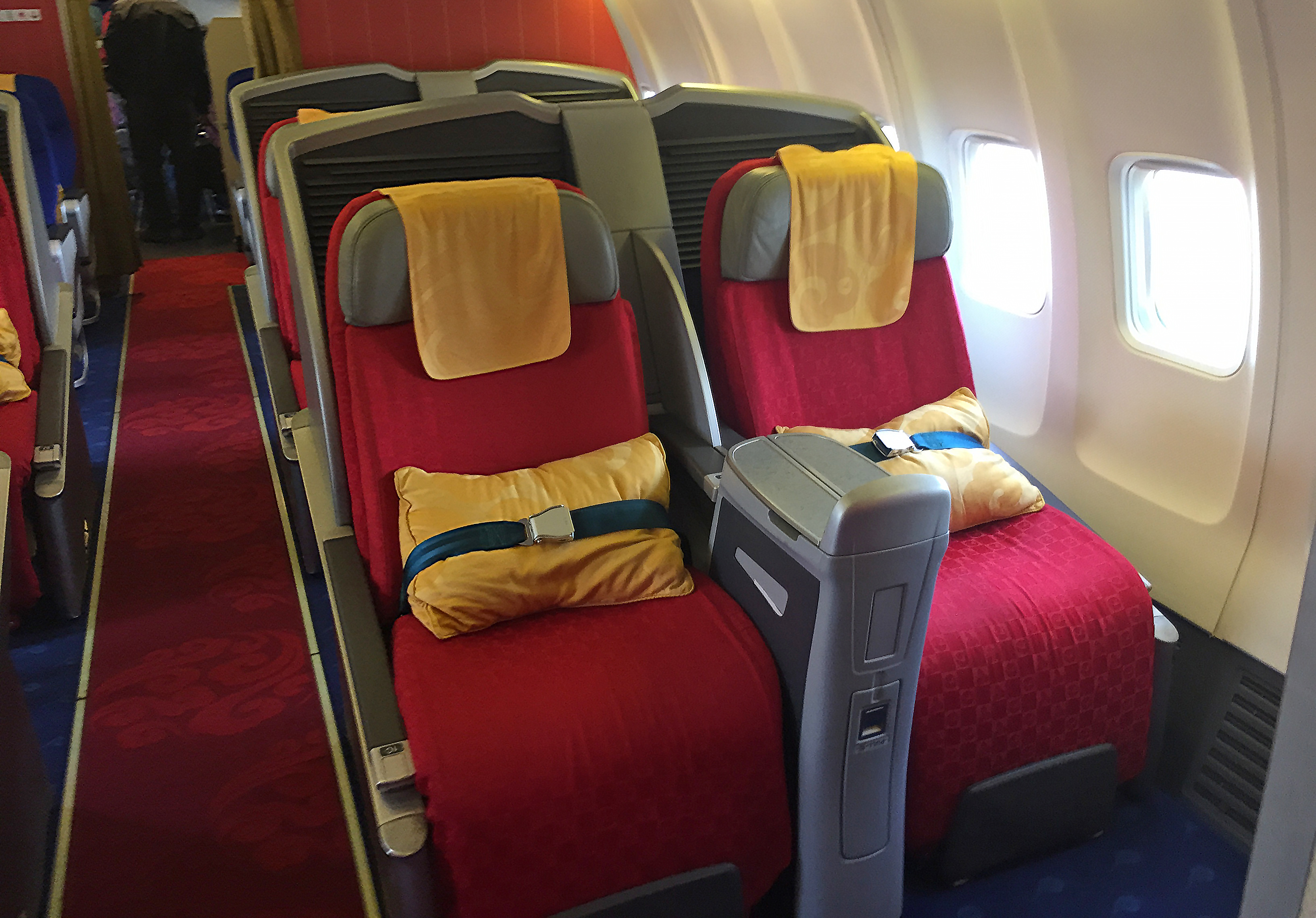
Former XiamenAir Boeing 757 first class cabin

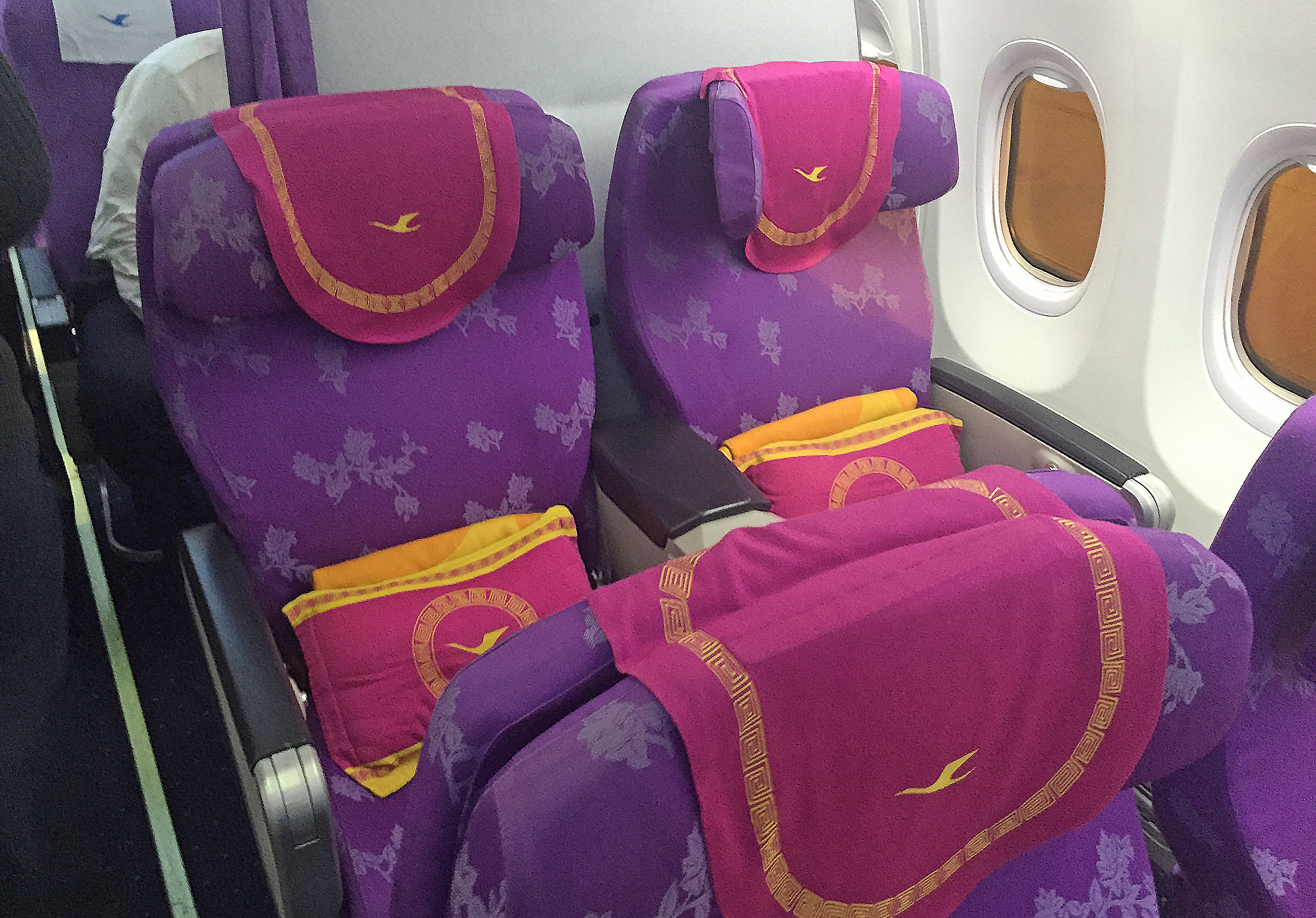
Short haul Business Class on a XiamenAir Boeing 737

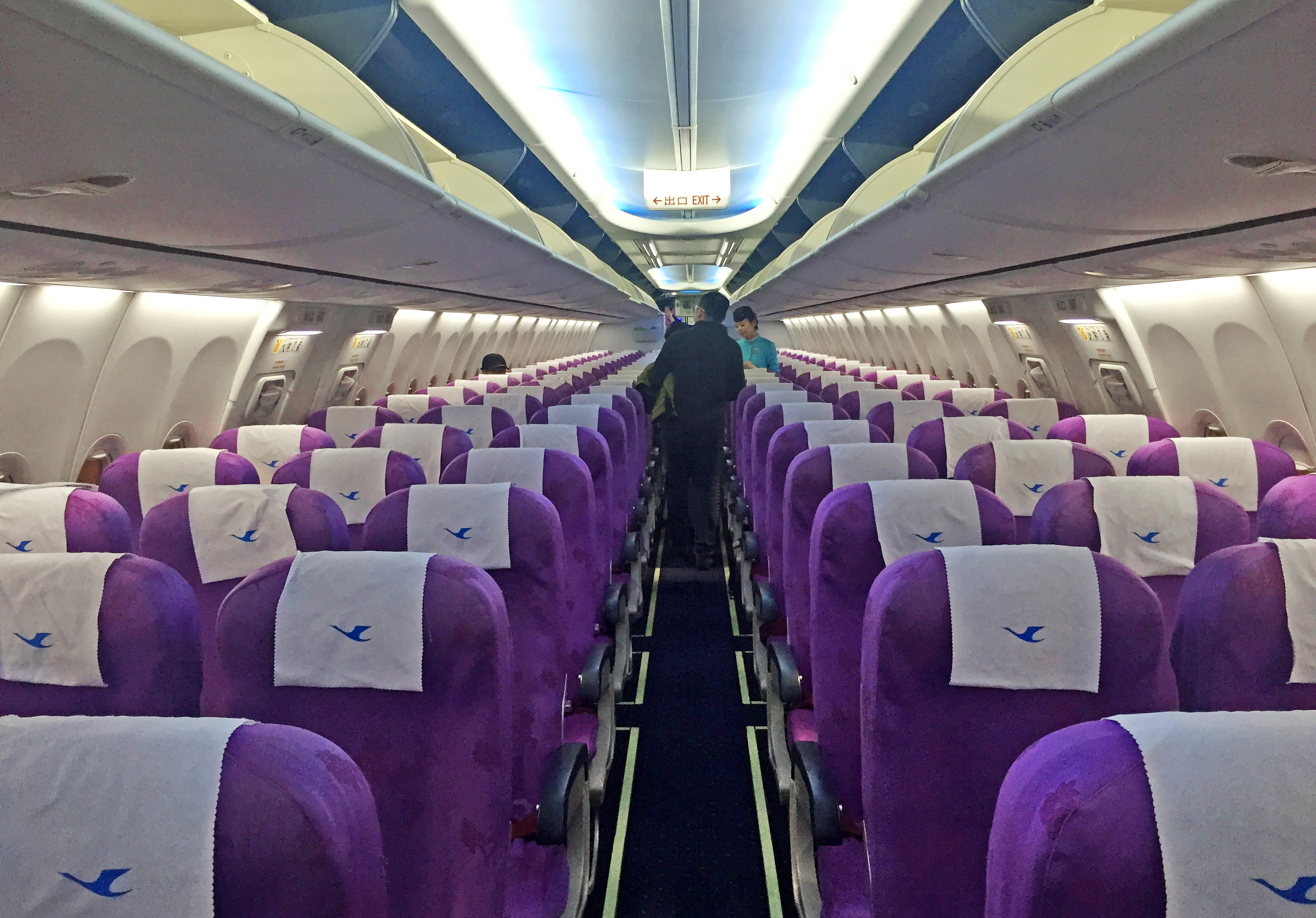
Short haul Economy Class on a XiamenAir Boeing 737

== Accidents and incidents ==
- On 2 October 1990, Xiamen Airlines Flight 8301 from Xiamen to Guangzhou, a Boeing 737-200 jetliner, was hijacked shortly after takeoff and collided with two additional aircraft upon landing at Baiyun International Airport, killing 128 people.
- On 16 August 2018, XiamenAir Flight 8667 crash-landed at Manila's Ninoy Aquino International Airport in the Philippines amidst heavy monsoon rains. The Boeing 737-800 skidded off the end of the runway. All 157 passengers and crew were unharmed. According to Flightradar24 data, the flight aborted its first landing attempt. As a result, the accident aircraft was parked on Runway 06/24, which is used for large aircraft, and the runway was closed until noon on the 18th.
