= Jahani =

Jahani (Persian: جهانی) is a surname. Notable people with the surname include:

- Abdul Bari Jahani, Afghan writer
- Milad Jahani, Iranian footballer
- Ghafour Jahani, Iranian football coach
- Khaled al-Johani, Saudi Arabian dissident
- Mohammed Al-Jahani, Saudi footballer
- Parviz Jahani, Kurdish writer
- Rahim Jahani, Afghan musician
- Sahar Jahani, American screenwriter

== See also ==
- Jani (surname)
