= Blue Dart Aviation =

Cargo airline of India

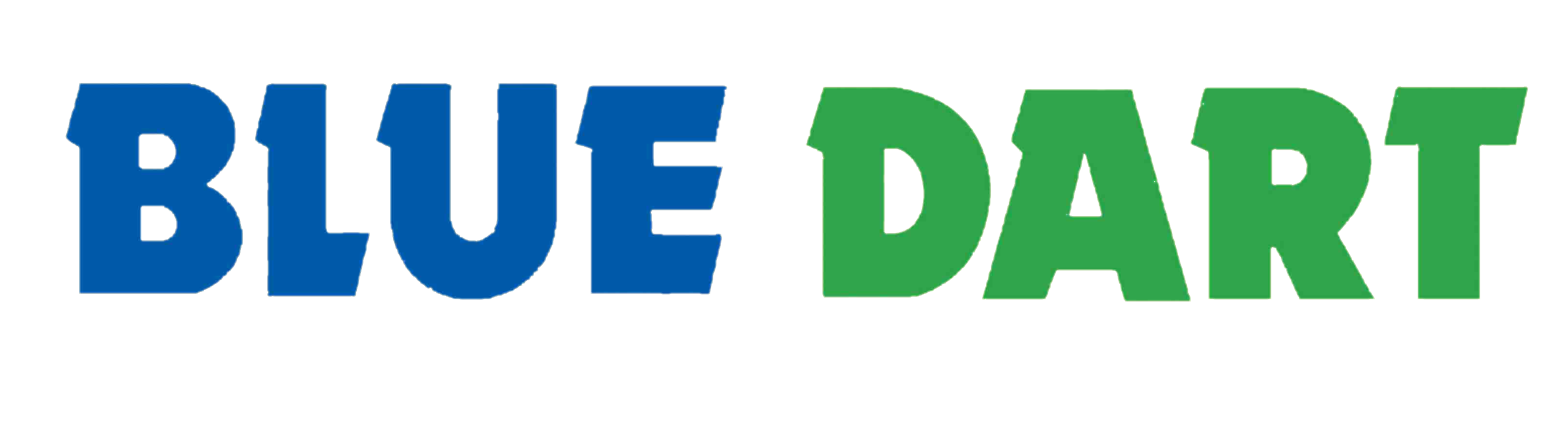

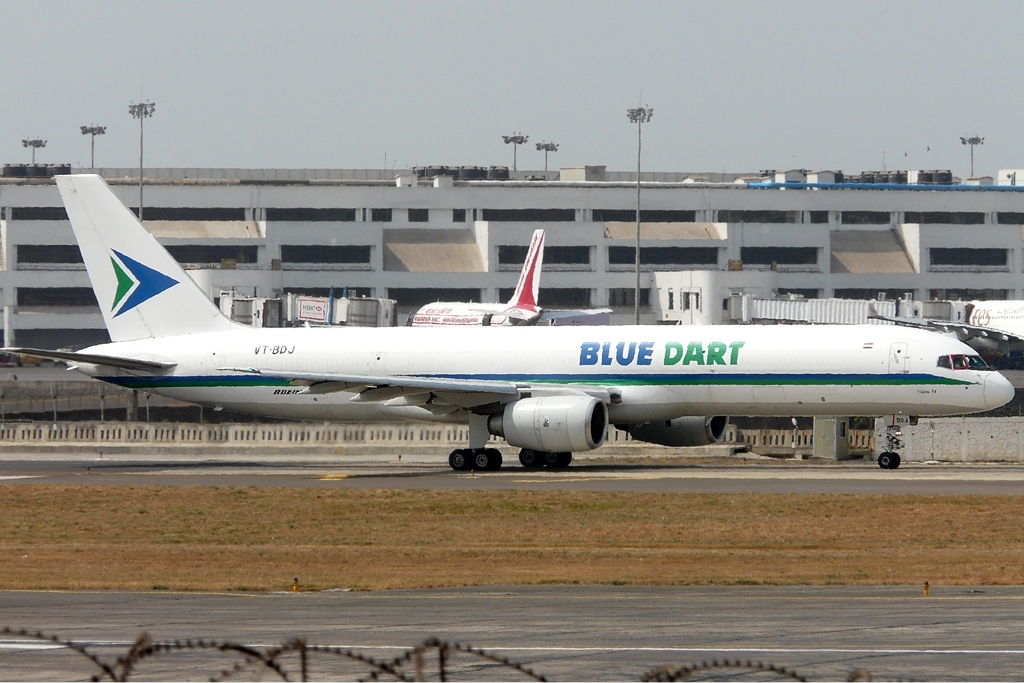
- A Blue Dart Boeing 757 in 2008
| IATA | ICAO | Call sign |
|---|---|---|
| BZ | BDA | BLUE DART |
- Founded: 1995; 31 years ago
- Hubs: Chennai
- Fleet size: 8
- Destinations: 8
- Parent company: Deutsche Post DHL Group (70%)
- Headquarters: Chennai, Tamil Nadu
- Key people: Tushar Jani (Chairman); Nikhil B Ved (Managing director)
- Website: bluedart.com/aviation

Blue Dart Aviation is a cargo airline based in Chennai, Tamil Nadu, India. It serves eight destinations with its main base as Chennai International Airport. Deutsche Post owns a 70% stake in the airline through its subsidiary Blue Dart Express.

== History ==
Blue Dart Aviation was incorporated in May 1994 as a fully owned subsidiary of Blue Dart Express Limited. It commenced operations with a fleet of Boeing 737-200 freighters on 17 June 1996. In 2017, Deutsche Post acquired a 70% stake in the airline through its subsidiary Blue Dart Express. In June 2018, it inaugurated a cargo hub at Chennai International Airport. In September 2023, it had expanded its fleet to eight by adding two Boeing 737-800 freighters, supplementing its existing Boeing 757-200 fleet. The airline opened a 4,300 m^{2} (46,000 ft^{2}) cargo facility at the Chhatrapati Shivaji Maharaj International Airport in Mumbai on 7 February 2019.

== Destinations ==
As of December 2025, Blue Dart Aviation flies to the following destinations:

| City | Airport | Notes |
|---|---|---|
| Ahmedabad | Sardar Vallabhbhai Patel International Airport | |
| Bangalore | Kempegowda International Airport | |
| Chennai | Chennai International Airport | Hub |
| Delhi | Indira Gandhi International Airport | |
| Guwahati | Lokpriya Gopinath Bordoloi International Airport | |
| Hyderabad | Rajiv Gandhi International Airport | |
| Kolkata | Netaji Subhas Chandra Bose International Airport | |
| Mumbai | Chhatrapati Shivaji Maharaj International Airport | |

== Fleet ==
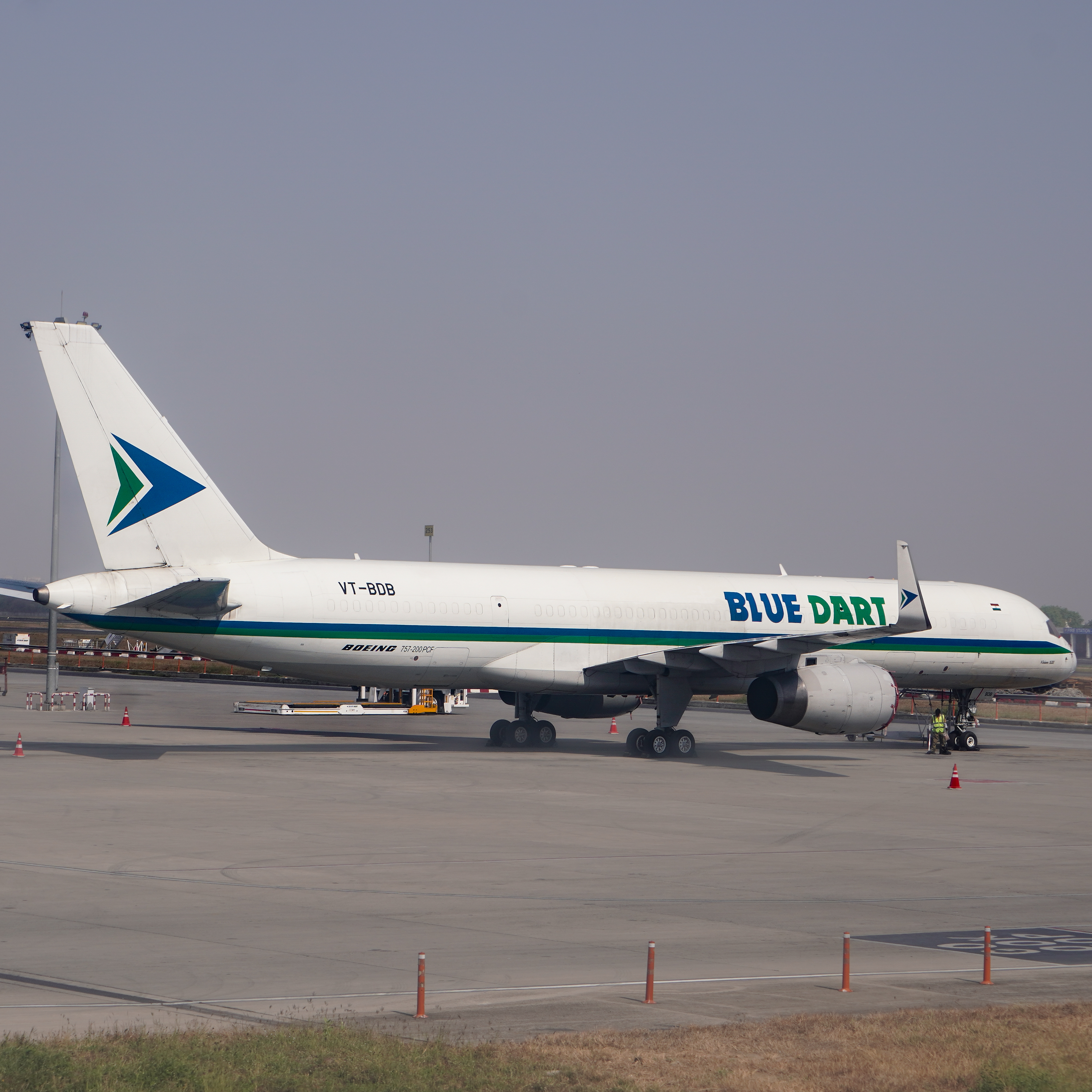
Blue Dart Aviation B757-200PCF

=== Current fleet ===
As of July 2026, Blue Dart Aviation operates the following aircraft:

Blue Dart Aviation fleet
| Aircraft | In service | Orders | Notes |
|---|---|---|---|
| Boeing 737-800 BCF | 2 | — | |
| Boeing 757-200PCF | 6 | — | |
| Total | 8 | — | |

=== Former fleet ===
The airline also operated the Boeing 737-200F until 2014.
