= Tushar Jani =

Indian businessman

- Born: Tushar Kumudrai Jani; 29 April 1953 (age 72); Mumbai
- Education: Bachelor of Science
- Alma mater: University of Mumbai
- Board member of: SCA Group CSC Group
- Children: Bhairavi Jani (Daughter) Prisha Jani (Daughter)

Tushar Kumudrai Jani or Tushar Jani (born 29 April 1953) is a business entrepreneur, investor, philanthropist and the founder of Blue Dart Express Limited and Blue Dart Aviation, Swift Freight and Express Industry Council of India (a courier and express cargo business association of all Indian companies). Swift Freight is India's first NVOCC business operator with a FMC registration in US, and Express Industry Council, is the first private custodian of courier loads in India, managing control over operations.

He created domestic courier terminals (for common user) at the airports of Mumbai, Delhi, Kolkata and Chennai, and international courier terminals (for common user) at Mumbai and Delhi airports of India. Tushar Jani is a member of the business session organizing committee, in the FIATA World Congress 2018, Delhi.

== Career ==
Company	Role	Ref
Blue Dart Aviation Ltd.	Founder, Chairman	
Blue Dart Express Ltd.	Chairman, Director (till 11 March 2005)	
Express Industry Council of India	Founder, ex-chairman	
CII's National Logistics Sub-Committee, Western Region (CII:Confederation of Indian Industry)	ex-chairman	
Swift Freight Pvt. Ltd.	Co-founder, director	
CSC Group, CSCI Pvt Ltd. (CSC: Cargo Service Center, India)	Chairman, director	
AMTOI (The Association of Multimodal Transport; Operators of India)	ex-president (formal)	
Maharashtra State Council's CII	ex-chairman	
ACHAI (Association of Cargo Handlers of India)	Current chairman	
ACFI (Air Cargo Forum India)	Current President	
Ritu Freight & Transportation Services Pvt Ltd.	Founder, director	
Nijoy Freight Systems Pvt. Ltd.	Founder, director	
Navneet Education Ltd.	Independent Director	
Transmart (India) Pvt Ltd.	Director	
Blue Sea Shipping Agency Pvt Ltd.	Director	
Scmooth (India) Pvt Ltd.	Director	
Span Design & Solution Service Pvt Ltd.	Director	
Ishan Freight & Transport Services Pvt Ltd.	Director	
Albatross Logistics Centre (India) Pvt Ltd.	Director	
SCA Logistics Pvt Ltd.	Director	
Cargo Service Center Cool Chain India Pvt Ltd.	Director	
Delhi Cargo Service Center Pvt Ltd.	Director	

== Personal life ==
Tushar Jani was born on 29 April 1953. He completed a Bachelor of Science degree from the University of Mumbai. He has two daughters. Tushar Jani is involved in the rehabilitation programs for the people affected by the earthquake, in Gujarat, via Tuberculosis Research Centre, at Bhavnagar.
