= Purnamasi Jani =

Indian social worker

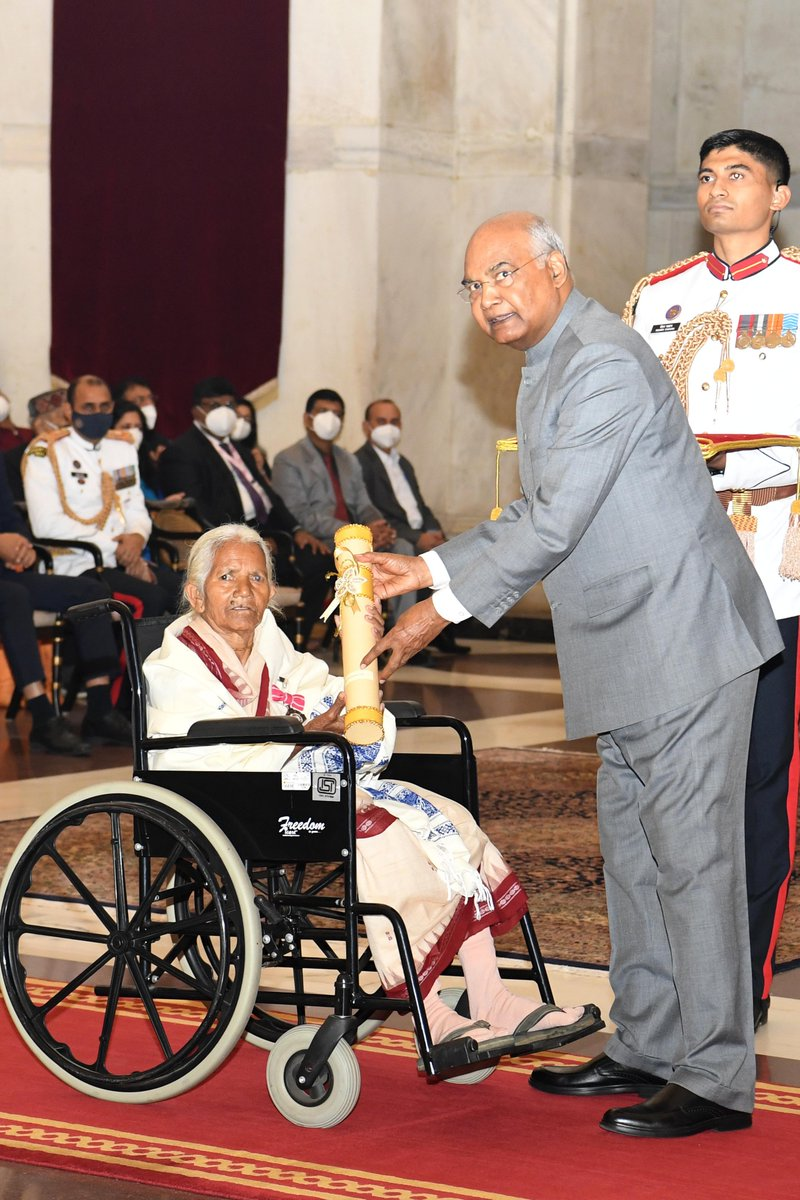
- Purnamasi Jani receiving Padma Shri award from President Ram Nath Kovind
- Born: Purnamasi Jani; 1944 (age 81–82); Odisha
- Known for: Devotional music
- Awards: Padma Shri (2021)

Purnamasi Jani (born 1944) also known as Tadisaru Bai is a poet, social activist from Odisha. She has composed over 50,000 devotional songs in Kui, Odia and Sanskrit. In 2021, she was awarded Padma Shri by the Indian Government.

== Personal life ==
Jani was born 1944 in Charipada village under Khajuripada block of Kandhamal district.

== Awards ==
- Odisha Sahitya Academy award for poetry in 2006
- South Odisha literature award in 2008
- Padma Shri in 2021
