= Karan Jani =

Indian astrophysicist

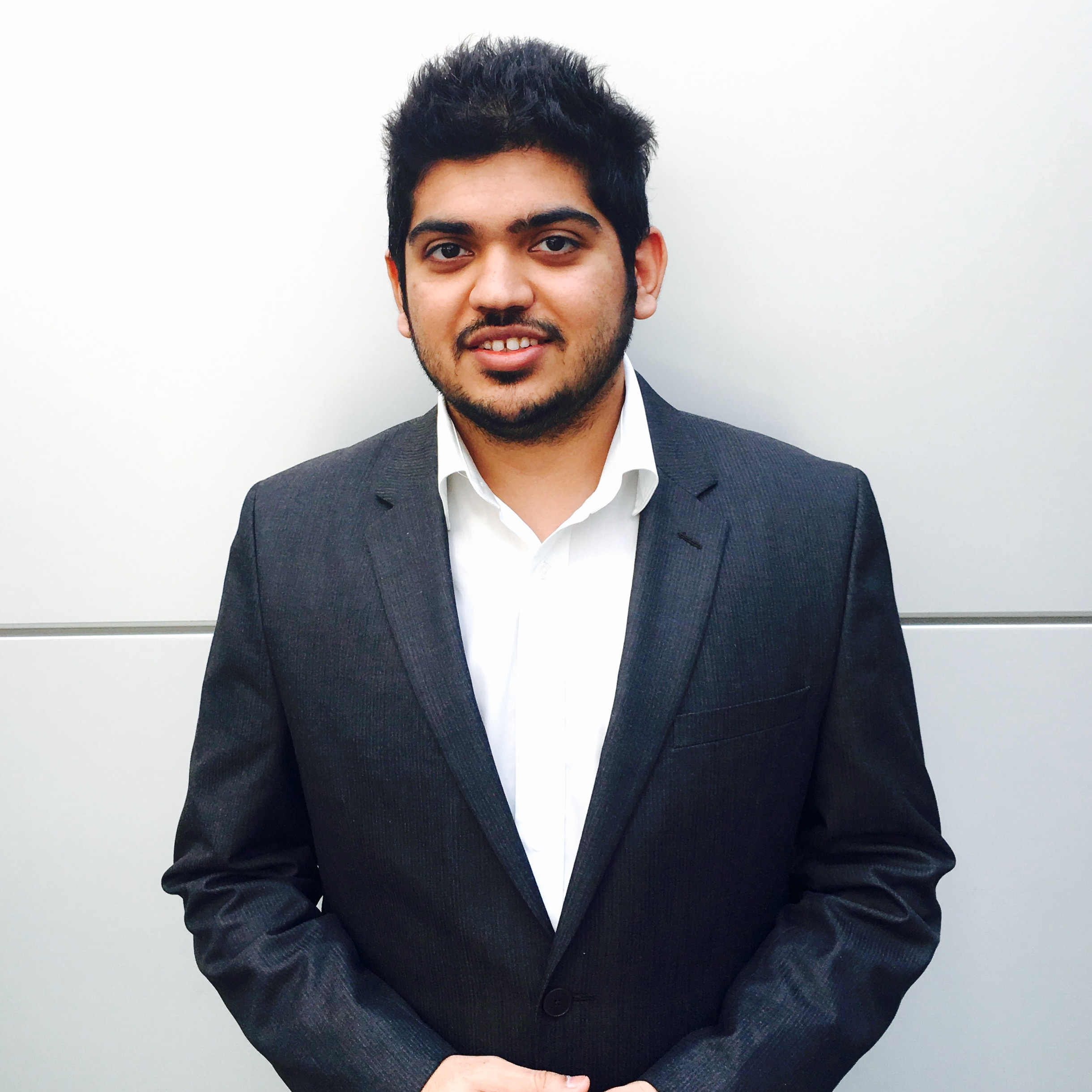
- Born: 18 May 1988 (age 38)
- Education: Georgia Tech (PhD), Pennsylvania State University (BS)
- Known for: Black holes, Gravitational Waves
- Website: http://www.karanjani.com/

Karan Jani (born 18 May 1988) is an Indian astrophysicist working on black holes, gravitational waves, and testing Albert Einstein's General Theory of Relativity. He is currently an assistant professor of physics and astronomy at Vanderbilt University, and holds the endowed position of Cornelius Vanderbilt Dean's Faculty Fellow. He has worked at the LIGO Livingston Observatory in the US, the Albert Einstein Institute in Germany, the Georgia Institute of Technology, and the Perimeter Institute for Theoretical Physics in Canada. He is a member of the Indian Initiative in Gravitational-wave Observations effort to build a gravitational wave detector LIGO in India.

== Early life and education ==
Karan was born in Mumbai, India and grew up in Vadodara, Gujarat. He conducted his K-12 schooling at a government school in Baroda, which had no science lab. His interest in physics and astronomy started when he attended Maharaja Sayajirao University and came across a copy of Stephen Hawking's A Brief History of Time. This inspired him to transfer to Penn State in the United States, from which he obtained simultaneous degrees in astronomy and astrophysics along with a minor in mathematics. His undergraduate research focused on the gravitational-wave science potential of the Laser Interferometer Space Antenna, under the supervision of Lee Samuel Finn.

Jani obtained his PhD in physics from the Georgia Institute of Technology in 2017 with his thesis, "Journey of binary black holes: From supercomputers to LIGO to universe."

== Research and career ==
Jani has previously held undergraduate research positions at the Institute of Gravitation and Cosmos at Penn State, Max Planck Institute for Gravitational Physics and Perimeter Institute for Theoretical Physics. He has held postdoctoral fellowships at Georgia Tech and Vanderbilt University.

He is part of the LIGO team made the first observation of gravitational waves from a binary black hole merger in 2015. He was one of the approximately 1200 authors of a paper on the subject in Physical Review D. He was also one of the 3 authors of a paper in Nature reporting a specific approach for observing an elusive class of black holes called intermediate-mass black holes.

In 2016, he was part of the delegation that met with Prime Minister of India Narendra Modi in Washington, DC, for the signing of the MoU between the National Science Foundation and Department of Atomic Energy to build a LIGO detector in India.

== Awards and recognition ==
- Forbes 30 Under 30 recipient in Science – 2017
- Jani was a co-recipient of the Special Breakthrough Prize in Fundamental Physics, awarded to "Сontributors who are authors of the paper Observation of Gravitational Waves from a Binary Black Hole Merger (Physical Review Letters, 11 February 2016) and contributors who also made important contributions to the success of LIGO." – 2016

== See also ==
- Gravitational-wave astronomy
- Gravitational-wave observatory
