= Blue Dart Express =

Indian logistics company

Blue Dart Express Limited

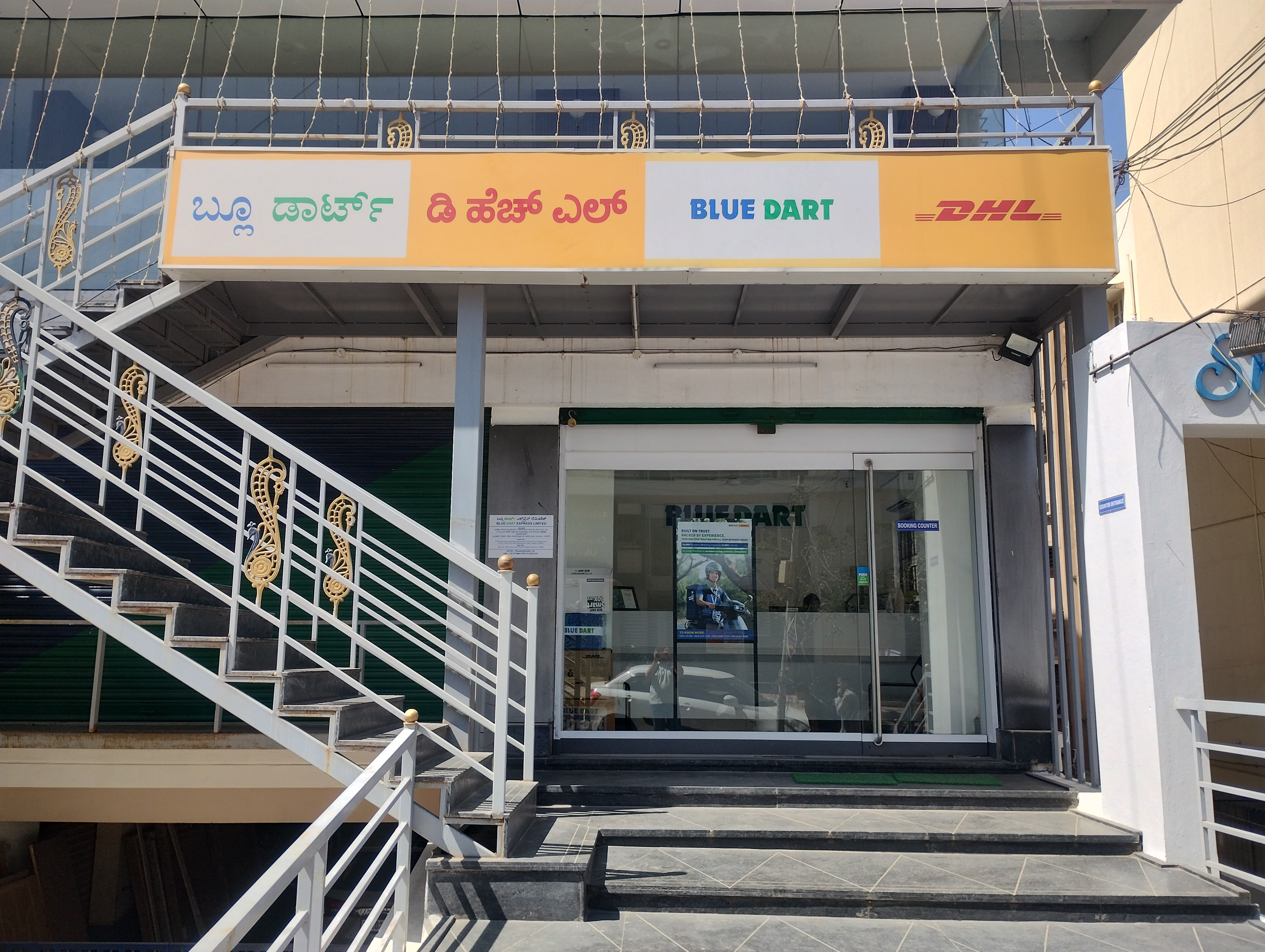
- A Blue Dart Express office in RR Nagar, Bangalore (2026)
- Trade name: Blue Dart Express Ltd.
- Type: Public
- Traded as: BSE: 526612; NSE: BLUEDART
- ISIN: INE233B0101
- Industry: Courier
- Founded: November 1983; 42 years ago
- Founders: Tushar Jani; Clyde Cooper; Khushroo Dubash
- Headquarters: Mumbai, Maharashtra, India
- Area served: Countrywide, South asian
- Products: Delivery; Express mail; Freight forwarding; Third-party logistics
- Revenue: ▲₹5,267 crore (US$550 million) (FY24)
- Operating income: ▼₹903 crore (US$94 million) (FY24)
- Net income: ▼₹301 crore (US$31 million) (FY24)
- Parent: DHL
- Subsidiaries: Blue Dart Aviation
- Website: bluedart.com

Blue Dart Express is an Indian logistics company that provides courier delivery services. It is headquartered in Mumbai, Maharashtra. It has a subsidiary cargo airline, Blue Dart Aviation that operates in South Asian countries. In 2002, Blue Dart had a business alliance with DHL Express and on 8 November 2004, DHL Express invested €120 million in it, and since then has been a major shareholder in the company.

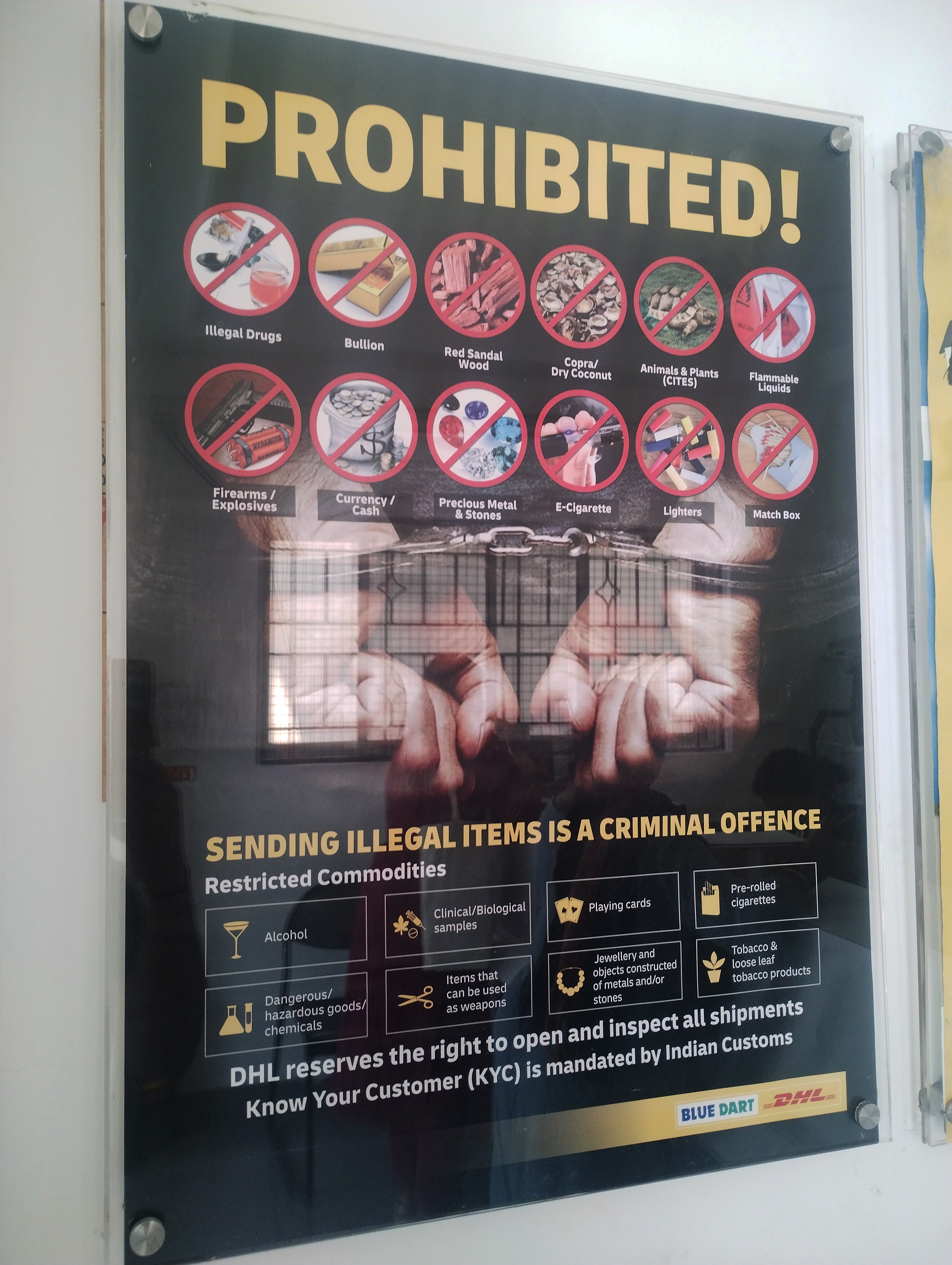
List of prohibited illegal items to send, in Blue Dart Express

== History ==
Blue Dart was founded by Tushar Jani (chairman) and his friends Khushroo Dubash and Clyde Cooper in November 1983. In its early years, Blue Dart had a business agreement with Gelco Exprccess International, UK, for the operations of international air package express services from India.

In 2010–11, it introduced ′cash on delivery (COD)′ to its customers as an additionaljdjd payment option for its courier services.

Blue Dart is handling almost 8% of India's e-commerce shipments as of 2024. It opened the India's largest, low emission 2.5 lakh sq ft integrated logistics center at Bijwasan, Delhi on January 14, 2025, to improve land and air connections in northern India. The facility can easily integrate with the PM Gati Shakti due to its immediate connectivity to the Indira Gandhi International Airport, Indian Railways, metro lines, and national highways. Every day, the integrated logistics hub can handle 550,000 inbound and outbound shipments.

== See also ==
- Delhivery, a supply chain company in India
- Courier in India
- Indian Postal Service
- DTDC, a courier service in India
- Ekart, a courier service in India
